= 1980s =

Decade of the Gregorian calendar (1980–1989)

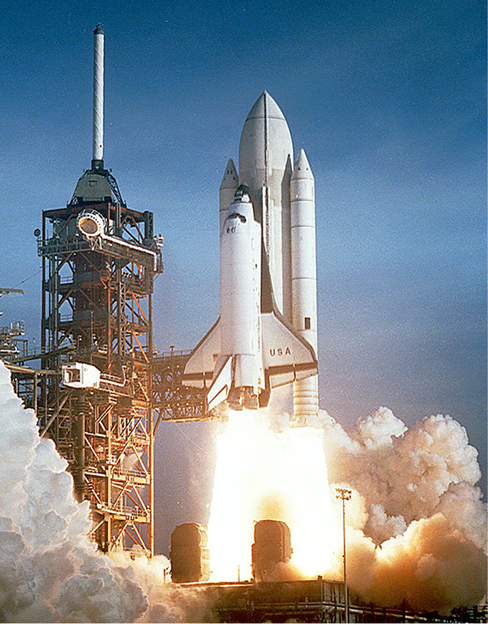
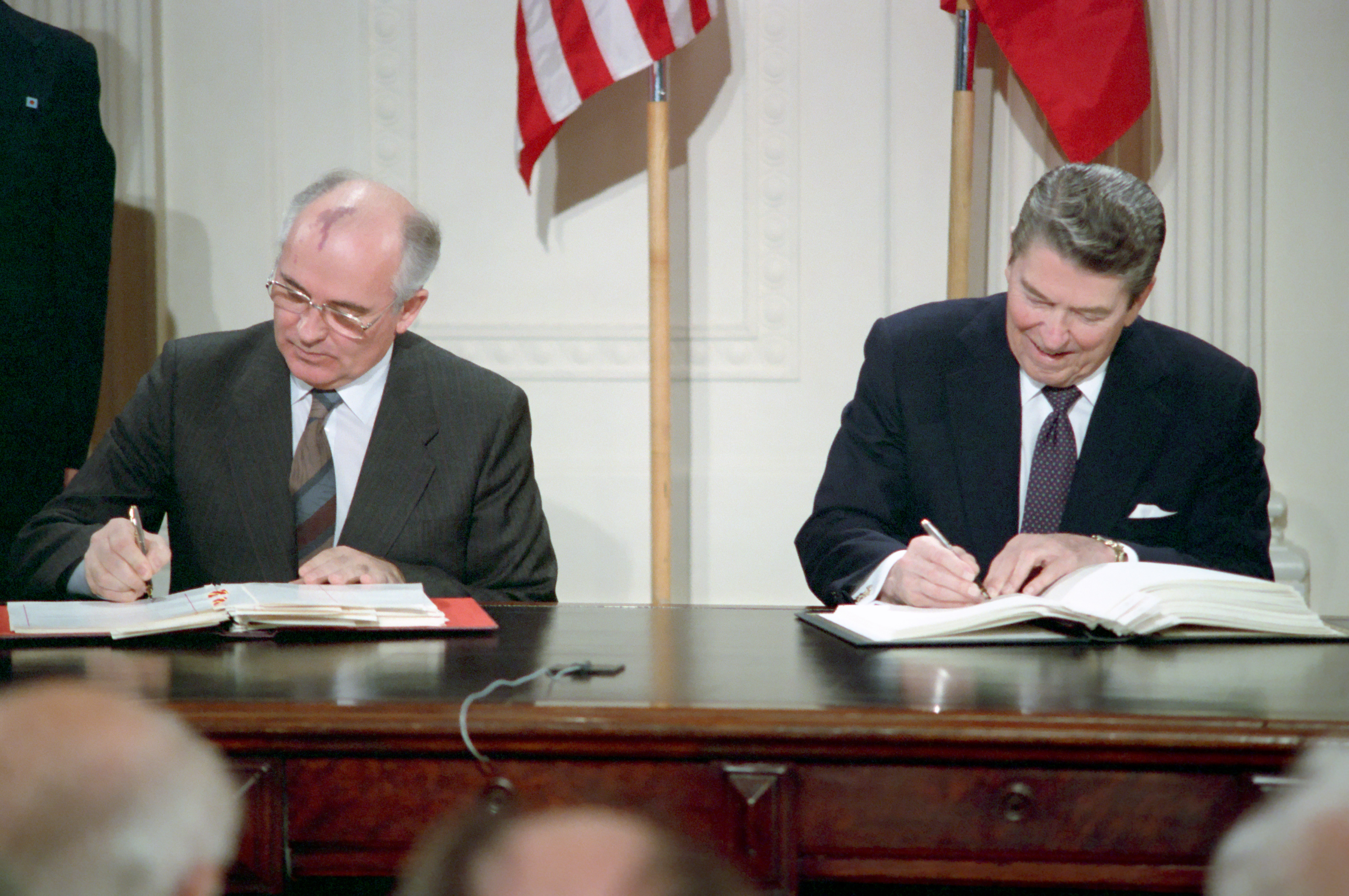
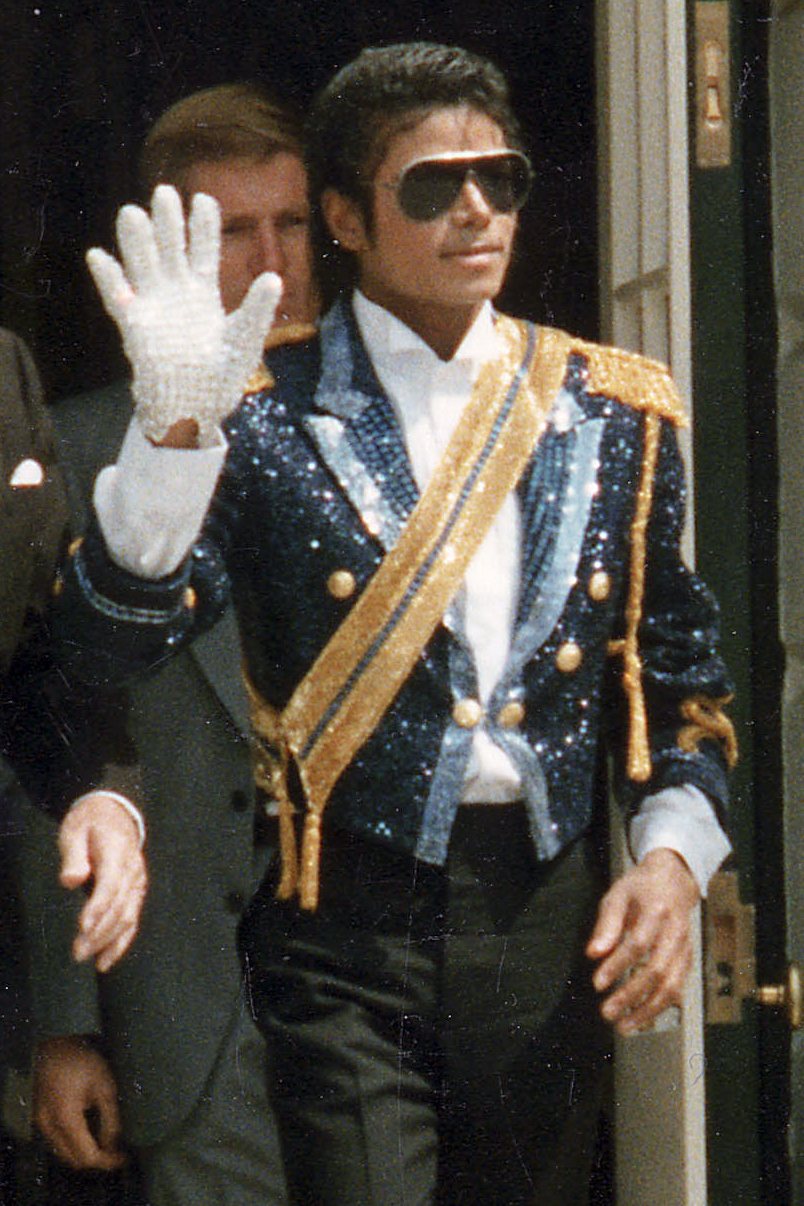
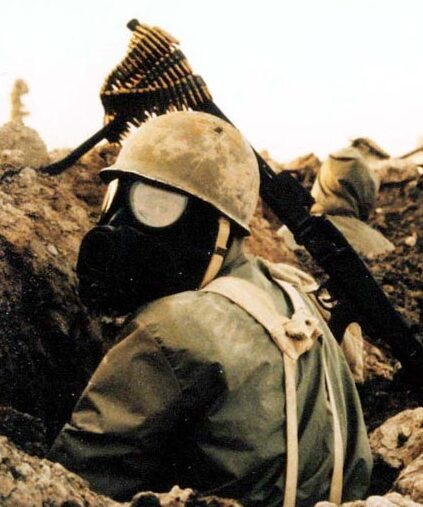
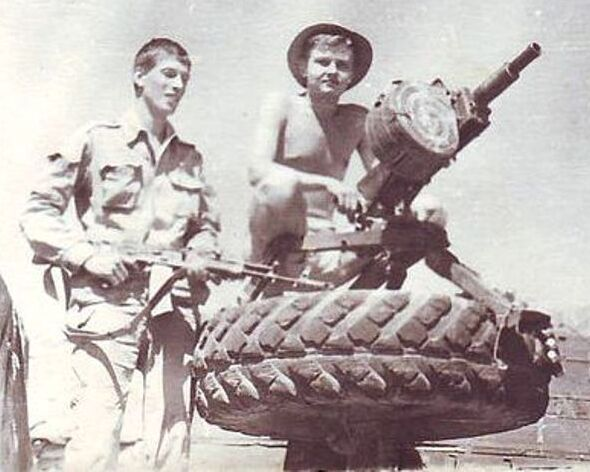
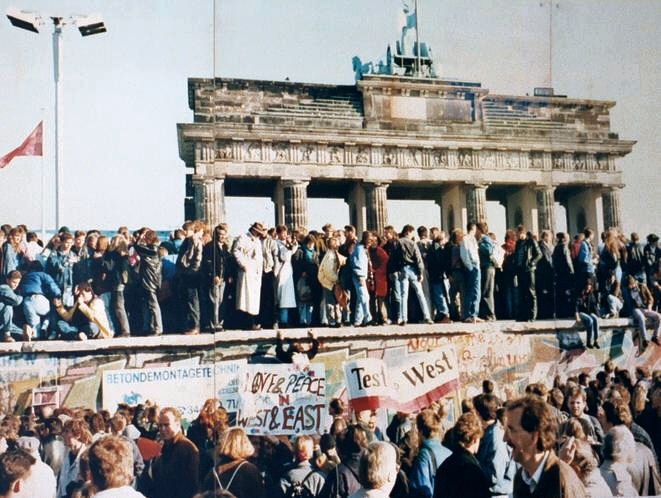
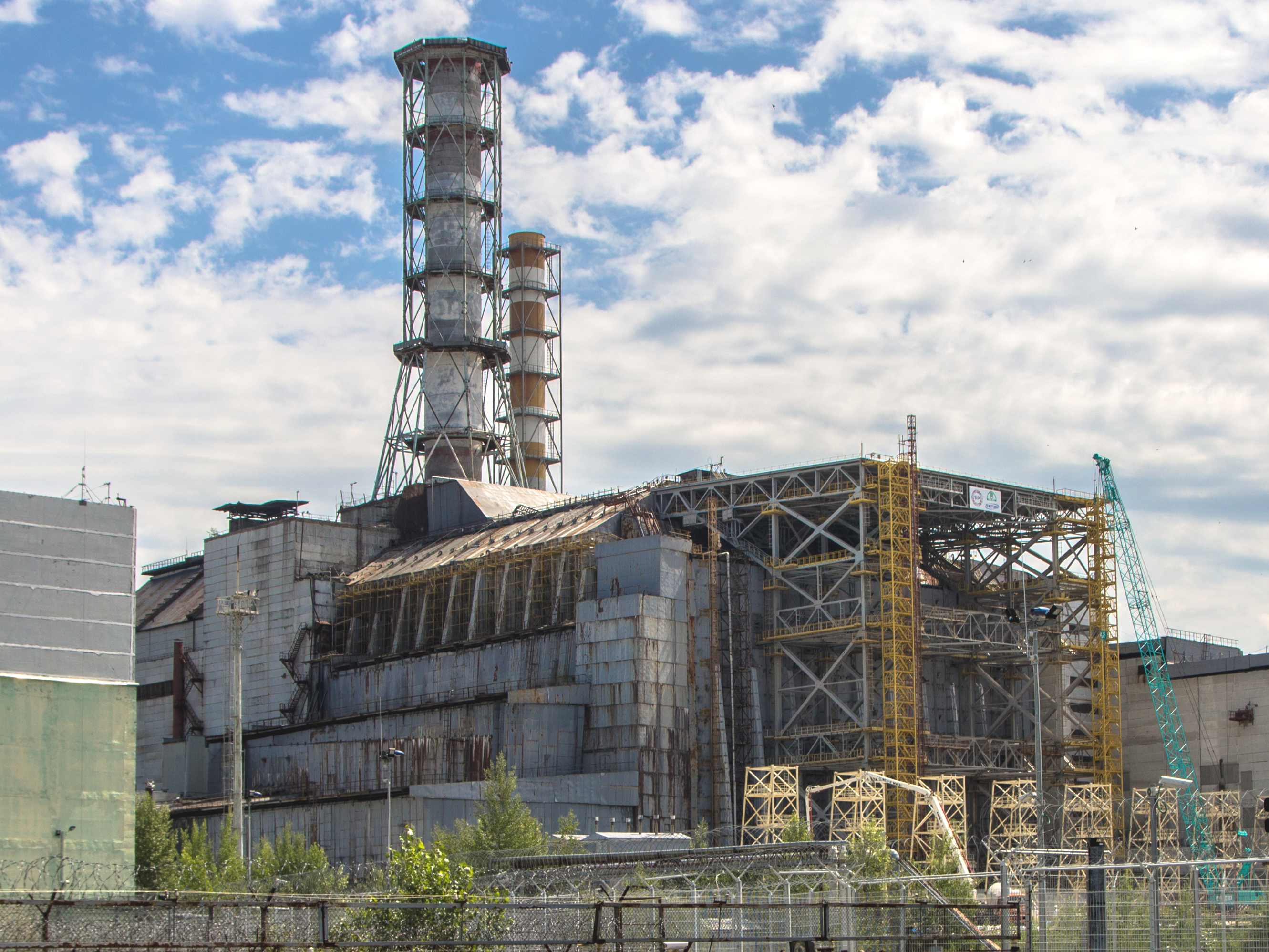
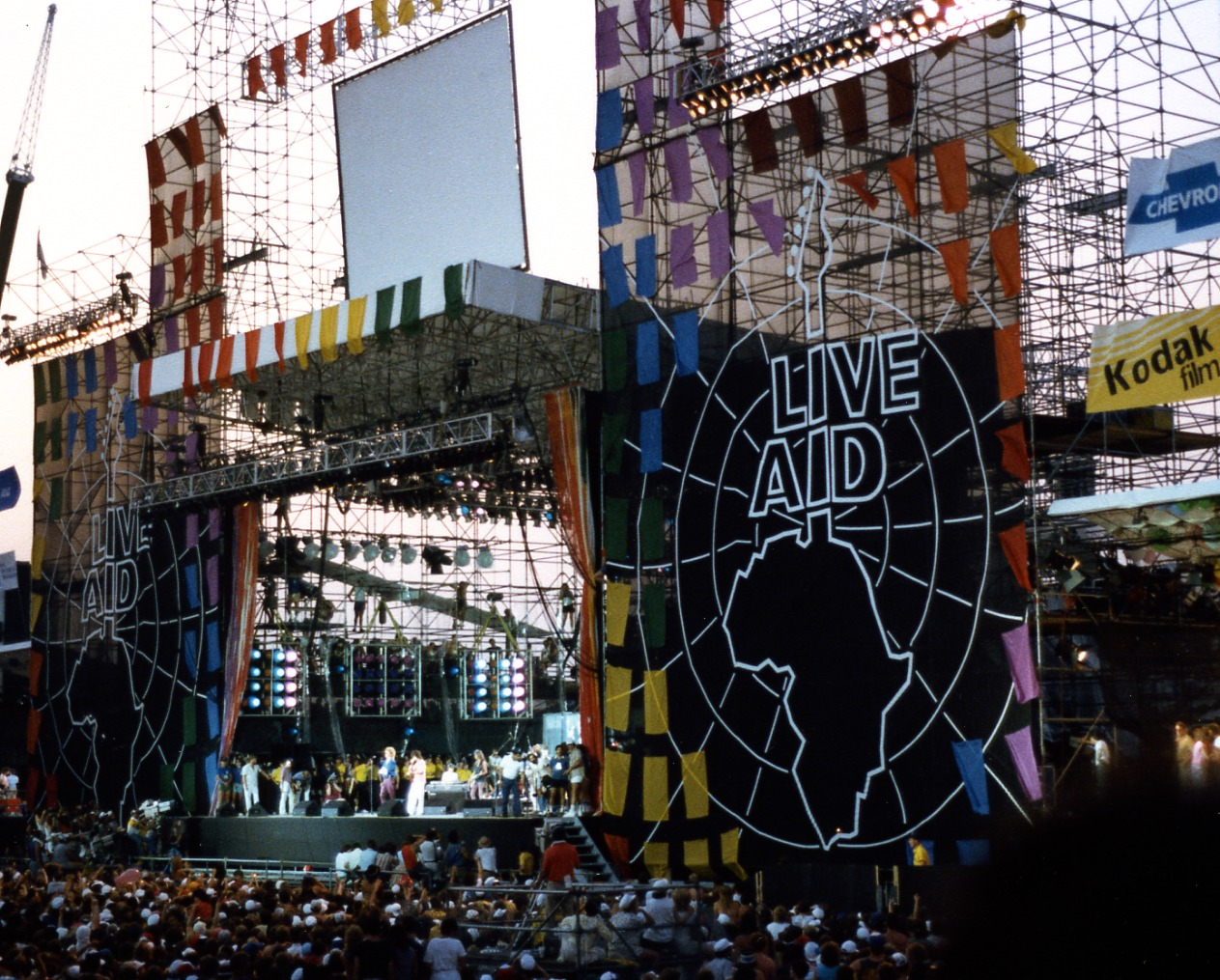
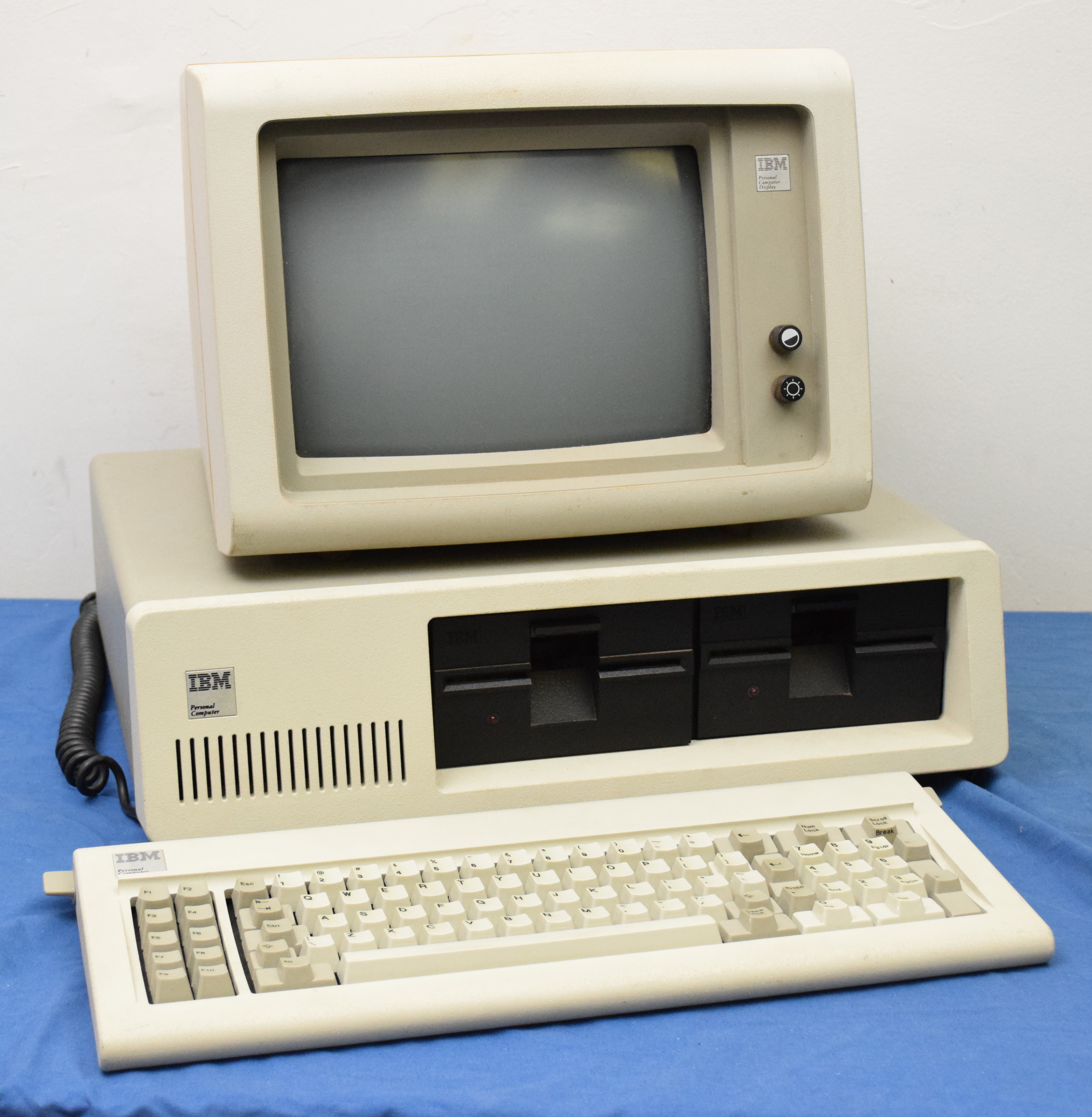
Clockwise from top-left:
- The first Space Shuttle, Columbia, lifts off in April 1981;
- US president Ronald Reagan and Soviet leader Mikhail Gorbachev ease tensions between the two superpowers, leading to the end of the Cold War;
- Michael Jackson became one of the world's biggest pop stars during the 1980s, with Thriller becoming the best-selling album of all time and his music videos helping establish MTV as a major force in popular culture;
- The fall of the Berlin Wall in November 1989;
- In August 1981, the IBM Personal Computer is released;
- In July 1985, the Live Aid concert is held in order to fund relief efforts for the famine in Ethiopia;
- Pollution and ecological problems persisted when the Soviet Union and much of the world were affected by radioactive debris from the 1986 Chernobyl disaster, and in 1984, when thousands of people perished in Bhopal during a gas leak from a pesticide plant;
- The Iran–Iraq War leads to over one million dead and $1 trillion spent;
- The Soviet–Afghan War leads to 1-3 million dead.

The 1980s (pronounced "nineteen-eighties", shortened to "the '80s" or "the Eighties") was the decade that began on 1 January 1980, and ended on 31 December 1989.

The decade saw a dominance of conservatism and free market economics, socioeconomic changes due to advances in technology and a worldwide move away from planned economies and towards laissez-faire capitalism in comparison to the 1970s. As economic deconstruction increased in the developed world, multiple multinational corporations associated with the manufacturing industry relocated into Thailand, Mexico, South Korea, Taiwan, and China. Japan and West Germany saw large economic growth during this decade. The AIDS epidemic became recognized in the 1980s and has since killed an estimated 40.4 million people (as of 2022). The global warming theory began to spread within the scientific and political community in the 1980s.

The United Kingdom and the United States moved closer to supply-side economic policies, beginning a trend towards global instability of international trade that would pick up more steam in the following decade as the fall of the USSR made right-wing economic policy more powerful.

The final decade of the Cold War opened with the US–Soviet confrontation continuing largely without any interruption. Superpower tensions escalated rapidly as President Reagan scrapped the policy of détente and adopted a new, much more aggressive stance on the Soviet Union. The world came perilously close to nuclear war for the first time since the Cuban Missile Crisis in 1962, but the second half of the decade saw a dramatic easing of superpower tensions and ultimately the total collapse of Soviet communism.

Developing countries across the world faced economic and social difficulties as they suffered from multiple debt crises in the 1980s, requiring many of these countries to apply for financial assistance from the International Monetary Fund (IMF) and the World Bank. Ethiopia witnessed widespread famine in the mid-1980s during the corrupt rule of Mengistu Haile Mariam, resulting in the country having to depend on foreign aid to provide food to its population and worldwide efforts to address and raise money to help Ethiopians, such as the Live Aid concert in 1985.

Major civil discontent and violence occurred, including the Angolan Civil War, the Ethiopian Civil War, the Moro conflict, the Salvadoran Civil War, the Ugandan Bush War, the insurgency in Laos, the Iran–Iraq War, the Soviet–Afghan War, the 1982 Lebanon War, the Falklands War, the Second Sudanese Civil War, the Lord's Resistance Army insurgency, and the First Nagorno-Karabakh War. Islamism became a powerful political force in the 1980s and many jihadist organizations, including Al Qaeda, were formed.

By 1986, nationalism was making a comeback in the Eastern Bloc, and the desire for democracy in socialist states, combined with economic recession, resulted in Mikhail Gorbachev's glasnost and perestroika, which reduced Communist Party power, legalized dissent and sanctioned limited forms of capitalism such as joint ventures with companies from capitalist countries. After tension for most of the decade, by 1988 relations between the communist and capitalist blocs had improved significantly and the Soviet Union was increasingly unwilling to defend its governments in satellite states.

The Revolutions of 1989 brought the overthrow and attempted overthrow of a number of communist-led governments, such as in Hungary, the Tiananmen Square protests of 1989 in China, the Czechoslovak "Velvet Revolution", Erich Honecker's East German regime, Poland's Soviet-backed government, and the violent overthrow of the Nicolae Ceaușescu regime in Romania. Destruction of the 155-km Berlin Wall, at the end of the decade, signaled a seismic geopolitical shift. The Cold War ended in the early 1990s with the successful Reunification of Germany and the USSR's demise after the August Coup of 1991.

The 1980s was an era of tremendous population growth around the world, surpassing the 1970s and 1990s, and arguably being the largest in human history. During the 1980s, the world population grew from 4.4 to 5.3 billion people. There were approximately 1.33 billion births and 480 million deaths. Population growth was particularly rapid in a number of African, Middle Eastern, and South Asian countries during this decade, with rates of natural increase close to or exceeding 4% annually. The 1980s saw the advent of the ongoing practice of sex-selective abortion in China and India as ultrasound technology permitted parents to selectively abort baby girls.

The 1980s saw great advances in genetic and digital technology. After years of animal experimentation since 1985, the first genetic modification of 10 adult human beings took place in May 1989, a gene tagging experiment which led to the first true gene therapy implementation in September 1990. The first "designer babies", a pair of female twins, were created in a laboratory in late 1989 and born in July 1990 after being sex-selected via the controversial assisted reproductive technology procedure preimplantation genetic diagnosis. Gestational surrogacy was first performed in 1985 with the first birth in 1986, making it possible for a woman to become a biological mother without experiencing pregnancy for the first time in history.

The global internet took shape in academia by the second half of the 1980s, as well as many other computer networks of both academic and commercial use such as USENET, Fidonet, and the bulletin board system. By 1989, the Internet and the networks linked to it were a global system with extensive transoceanic satellite links and nodes in most developed countries. Based on earlier work, from 1980 onwards Tim Berners-Lee formalized the concept of the World Wide Web by 1989. Television viewing became commonplace in the Third World, with the number of TV sets in China and India increasing by 15 and 10 times respectively.

The Atari Video Computer System console became widespread in the first part of the decade, often simply called "Atari". The 1980 Atari VCS port of Space Invaders was its first killer app. The video game crash of 1983 ended the system's popularity and decimated the industry until the Nintendo Entertainment System re-established the console market in North America. The hand-held Game Boy launched in 1989. Super Mario Bros. and Tetris were the decade's best selling games. Pac-Man was the highest grossing arcade game. Home computers became commonplace. The 1981 IBM PC led to a large market for IBM PC compatibles. The 1984 release of the Macintosh popularized the WIMP style of interaction.

== Politics and wars ==
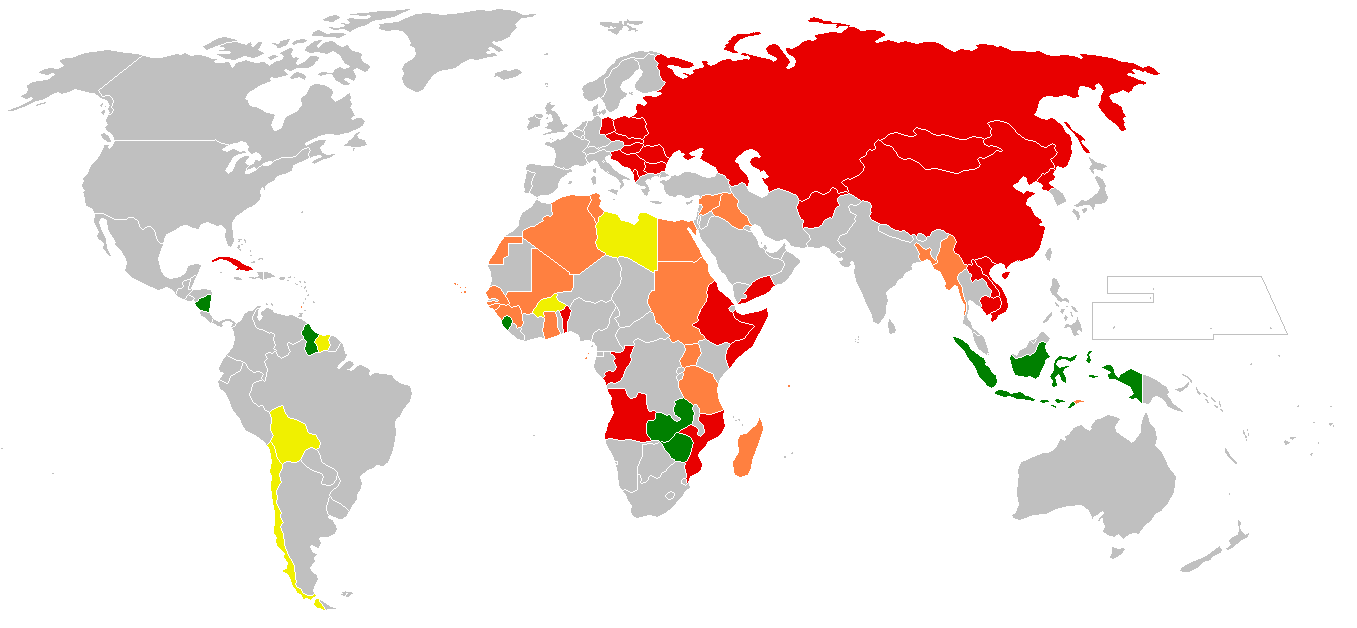
Cold War Map of Communist & Socialist countries in 1985

=== Wars ===
The most prominent armed conflicts of the decade include:

==== International wars ====
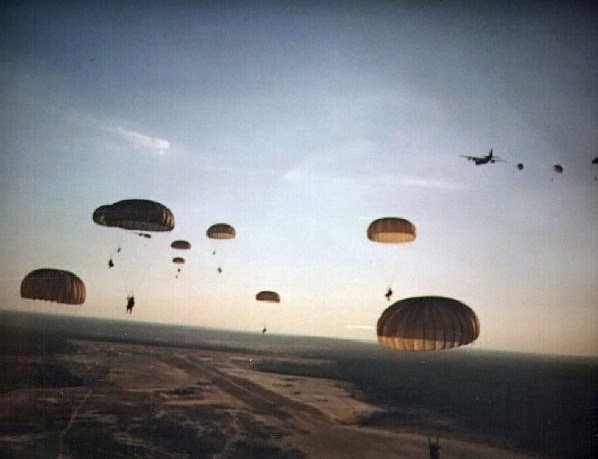
Invasion of Grenada, October 1983

The most notable wars of the decade include:

- The Cold War (1947–1991)
  - Soviet–Afghan War (1979–1989) – a war fought between the Soviet Union and the Islamist Mujahideen Resistance in Afghanistan. The Mujahideen found other support from a variety of sources including the Central Intelligence Agency of the United States (see Operation Cyclone), as well as Saudi Arabia, Pakistan and other Muslim nations through the context of the Cold War and the regional India–Pakistan conflict.
  - Invasion of Grenada (1983) – a 1983 US led invasion of Grenada, triggered by a military coup which ousted a brief revolutionary government. The successful invasion led to a change of government but was controversial due to charges of American imperialism, Cold War politics, the involvement of Cuba, the unstable state of the Grenadian government, and Grenada's status as a Commonwealth realm.
  - Salvadoran Civil War (1980–1992) – part of the cold war conflicts, reached its peak in the 1980s, 70,000 Salvadorans died.
  - Cambodian–Vietnamese War (1978–1991)
- Argentina invaded the Falkland Islands, sparking the Falklands War. It occurred from 2 April to 14 July 1982, between the United Kingdom and Argentina as British forces fought to recover the islands. Britain emerged victorious and its stance in international affairs and its long-decaying reputation as a colonial power received an unexpected boost. The military junta of Argentina, on the other hand, was left humiliated by the defeat; and its leader Leopoldo Galtieri was deposed three days after the end of the war. A military investigation known as the Rattenbach Report even recommended his execution.
- Arab–Israeli conflict (early 20th century – present)
  - 1982 Lebanon War – the Government of Israel ordered the invasion as a response to the assassination attempt against Israel's ambassador to the United Kingdom, Shlomo Argov, by the Abu Nidal Organization and due to the constant terror attacks on northern Israel made by the terrorist organizations which resided in Lebanon. After attacking the PLO, as well as Syrian, leftist and Muslim Lebanese forces, Israel occupied southern Lebanon and eventually surrounded the PLO in west Beirut and subjected to heavy bombardment, they negotiated passage from Lebanon.
  - In October 1985 eight Israeli F-15 Eagles carried out Operation Wooden Leg intending to bomb the PLO's new headquarters in Tunis, Tunisia, more than 2,000 km from Israel. The attack was later condemned by the United Nations Security Council. The United States is thought to have assisted or known of the attack.
- The Iran–Iraq War took place from 1980 to 1988. Iraq was accused of using illegal chemical weapons to kill Iranian forces and against its own dissident Kurdish populations. Both sides suffered enormous casualties, but the poorly equipped Iranian armies suffered worse for it, being forced to use soldiers as young as 15 in human-wave attacks. Iran finally agreed to an armistice in 1988.
- The United States launched an aerial bombardment of Libya in 1986 in retaliation for Libyan support of terrorism and attacks on US personnel in Germany and Turkey.
- The South African Border War between South Africa and the alliance of Angola, Namibia and Zambia ended in 1989, ending over thirty years of conflict.
- The United States engaged in significant direct and indirect conflict in the decade via alliances with various groups in a number of Central and South American countries claiming that the US was acting to oppose the spread of communism and end illicit drug trade.
  - The US government supported the government of Colombia's attempts to destroy its large illicit cocaine-trafficking industry and provided support for right-wing military government in the Salvadoran civil war which became controversial after the El Mozote massacre on 11 December 1981, in which US trained Salvadoran paramilitaries killed 1000 Salvadoran civilians.
  - The United States, along with members of the Organisation of Eastern Caribbean States, invaded Grenada in 1983.
  - The Iran–Contra affair erupted which involved US interventionism supporting the Contras in Nicaragua, resulting in members of the US government being indicted in 1986.
  - US military action began against Panama in December 1989 to overthrow its dictator, Manuel Noriega resulting in 3,500 civilian casualties and the restoration of democratic rule.
- Battle of Cuito Cuanavale took place as part of the Angolan Civil War and South African Border War from 1987 to 1988. The battle involved the largest fighting in Africa since World War II between military forces from Angola, Cuba (expeditionary forces) and Namibia versus military forces from South Africa and the dissident Angolan UNITA organization.
- The First Nagorno-Karabakh War between Azerbaijan and the Armenia started in 1988 and ended in 1994.
- The United States invasion of Panama in December 1989 led to the deposition of Manuel Noriega.

==== Civil wars and guerrilla wars ====
The most notable internal conflicts of the decade include:

- The Tiananmen Square protests of 1989 occurred in the People's Republic of China in 1989, in which pro-democracy protesters demanded political reform. The protests were crushed by the People's Liberation Army.
- The First Intifada (First Uprising) in the Gaza Strip and West Bank began in 1987 when Palestinian Arabs mounted large-scale protests against the Israeli military presence in the Gaza Strip and West Bank, largely inhabited by Palestinians. The First Intifada would continue until peace negotiations began between the Palestinian Liberation Organization (PLO) and the Israeli government in 1993.
- Lebanese Civil War (1975–1990) – Throughout the decade, Lebanon was engulfed in civil war between Islamic and Christian factions.
- The Kanak and Socialist National Liberation Front began a violent campaign for independence in New Caledonia.
- Greenpeace's attempts to monitor French nuclear testing on Mururoa were halted by the sinking of the Rainbow Warrior.
- The Second Sudanese Civil War erupts in 1983 between the Muslim government of Sudan in the north and non-Muslim rebel secessionists in Southern Sudan. The conflict continues through the present day Darfur genocide.
- 1986 Egyptian conscripts riot: On 25 February 1986 around 25,000 conscripts of the Central Security Forces (CSF), an Egyptian paramilitary force, staged violent protests in and around Cairo, due to the rumour that their three-year mandatory service would be prolonged by one additional year without any additional benefits or rank promotion. It was suppressed by the army.
- Internal conflict in Peru: The communist Túpac Amaru Revolutionary Movement starts its fight against the Peruvian state in 1980, that would continue until the end of the 1990s.
- Haitian dictator Jean-Claude Duvalier was overthrown by a popular uprising on 6 February 1986.
- The Troubles in Northern Ireland continued.
- Ethiopian Civil War (1974–1991)
- Angolan Civil War (1975–2002)
- Ugandan Bush War (1980–1986)
- Sri Lankan Civil War (1983–2009)

=== Terrorist attacks ===
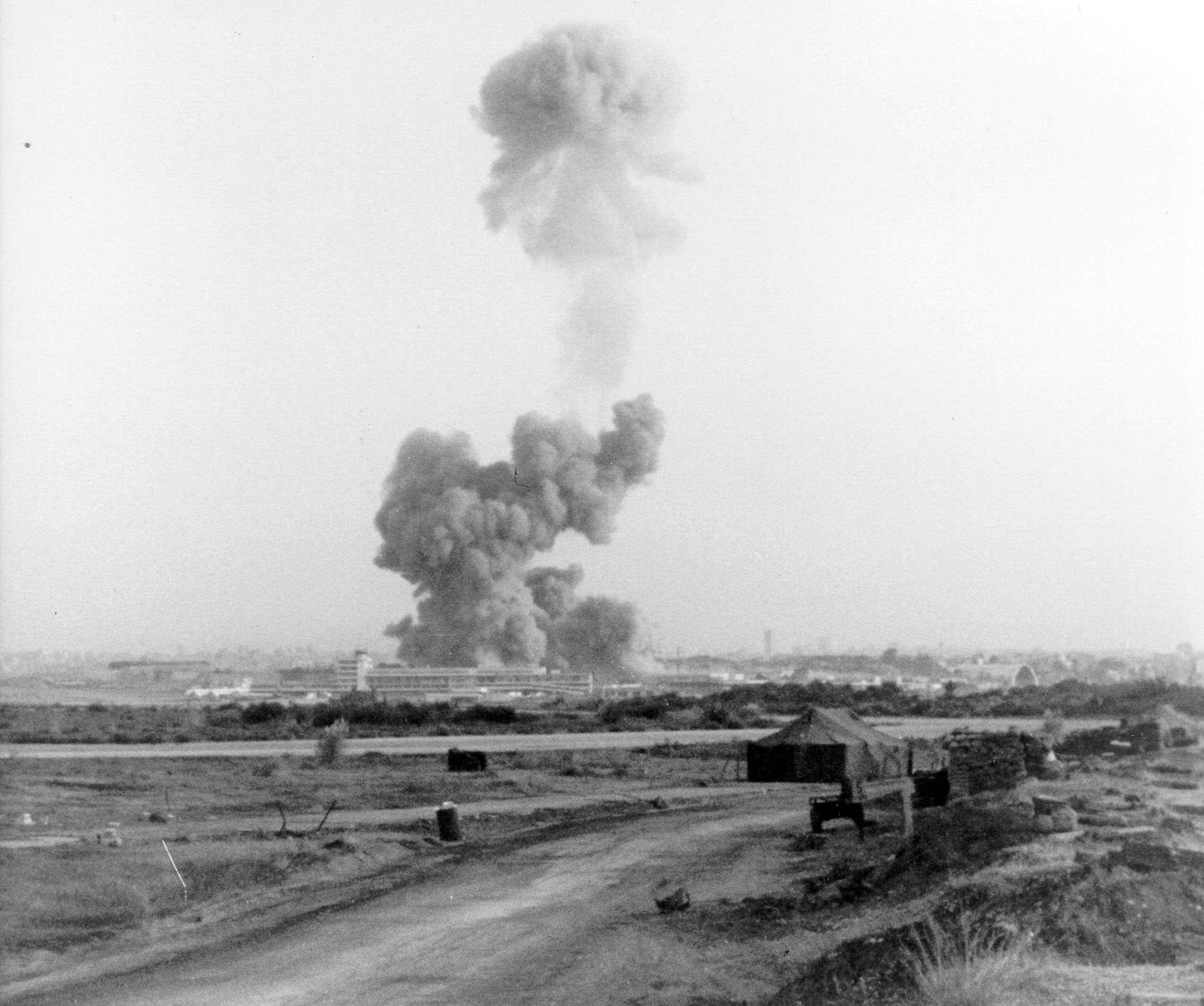
1983 Beirut barracks bombing

The most notable terrorist attacks of the decade include:

- Bologna massacre in Italy on 2 August 1980, three members of the neo-fascist group Nuclei Armati Rivoluzionari detonate a time bomb at Bologna Central Station, killing 85 people.
- El Mozote massacre in El Salvador on 11 December 1981, against civilians, committed by government forces supported by the United States during their anti-guerrilla campaign against Marxist–Leninist rebels.
- The 1983 Beirut barracks bombing – during the Lebanese Civil War two truck bombs struck separate buildings housing United States and French military forces killing 299 American and French servicemen. The organization Islamic Jihad claimed responsibility for the bombing.
- The Rome and Vienna airport attacks took place on 27 December 1985, against the Israeli El Al airline. The attack was done by militants loyal to Abu Nidal, backed by the government of Libya.
- Air India Flight 182 was destroyed on 23 June 1985, by Sikh-Canadian militants. It was the biggest mass murder involving Canadians in Canada's history.
- On 21 December 1988, Pan Am Flight 103 was blown up over the village of Lockerbie, Scotland, while en route from London's Heathrow Airport to New York's JFK. The bombing killed all 259 people on board, plus 11 people on the ground. The bombing was and remains the worst terrorist attack on UK soil.

=== Coups ===
The most prominent coups d'état of the decade include:

- A military coup is launched in Suriname on 25 February 1980; the country's politics are dominated by the military until 1991.
- Nigeria suffered military coups in 1983 and 1985.
- Sitiveni Rabuka staged two military coups in Fiji in 1987, and declared the country a republic the same year.
- The "Anti-Bureaucratic Revolution" – a series of interconnected coups d'états – take place in Yugoslavia from 1988 to 1989 through mass protests organized and committed by supporters of Serbian politician Slobodan Milošević overthrow the governments of Serbia's autonomous provinces of Kosovo and Vojvodina, and the government of Montenegro, and finally the main government of Serbia with Milošević becoming President of Serbia.

=== Nuclear threats ===
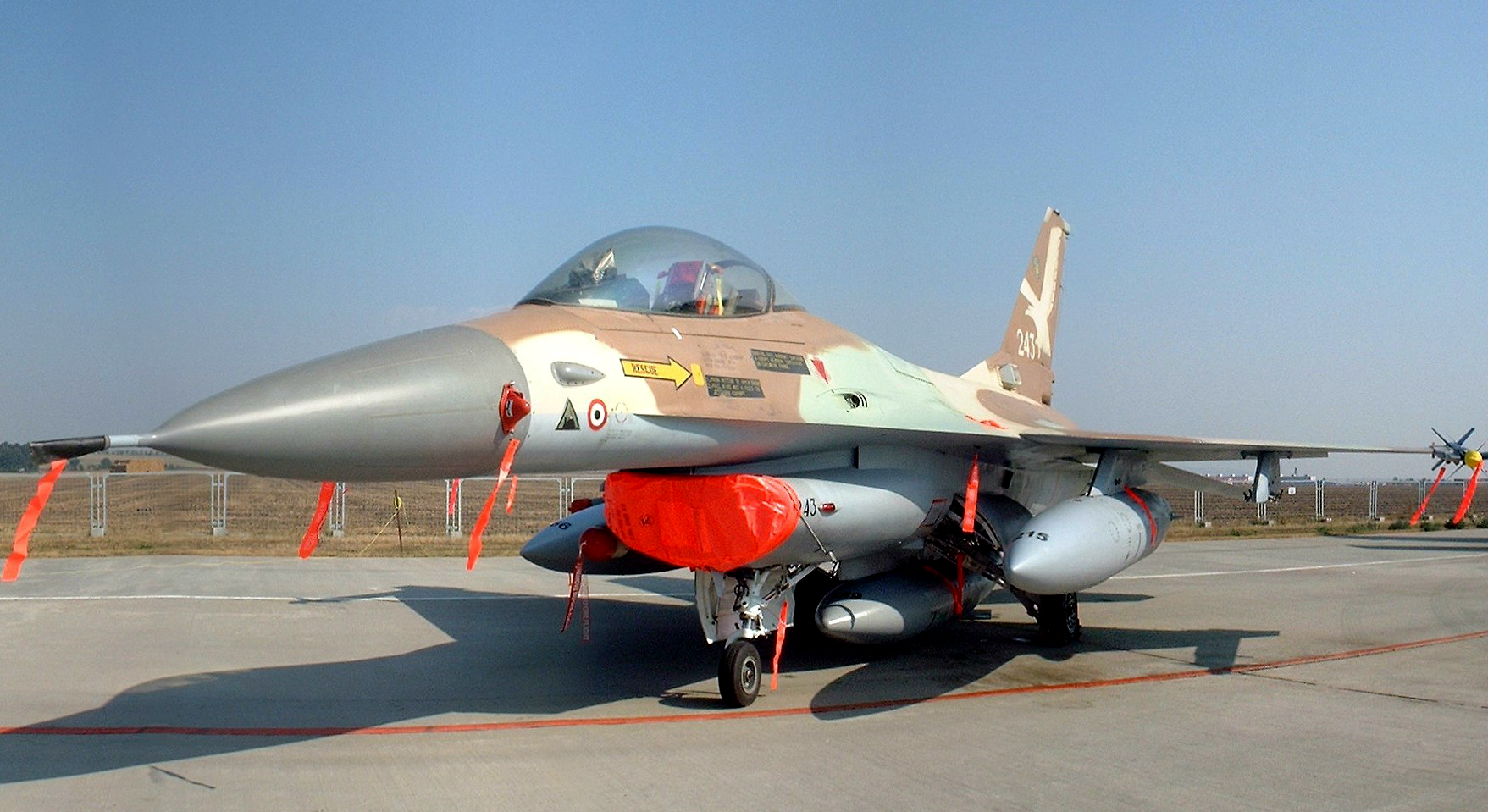
The Israeli Air Force F-16A Netz '243' that was flown by Colonel Ilan Ramon during Operation Opera

- Operation Opera – a 1981 surprise Israeli air strike that destroyed the Iraqi nuclear reactor being constructed near Baghdad. Israeli military intelligence assumed this was for the purpose of plutonium production to further an Iraqi nuclear weapons program. Israeli intelligence also believed that the summer of 1981 would be the last chance to destroy the reactor before it would be loaded with nuclear fuel.
- US President Reagan's decision to station intermediate-range nuclear missiles in Western Europe provoked mass protests involving more than one million people.

=== Decolonization and independence ===
- Following the decolonization and independence of the Commonwealth realms.
  - In 1982, Canada gained official independence from the United Kingdom with the Canada Act 1982, authorized by the signature by Elizabeth II. This Act severed all political dependencies of the United Kingdom in Canada (although the Queen remained the head of state).
  - In 1986, Australia gained full independence from the United Kingdom with the Australia Act 1986, which severed the last remaining powers of the British government over the Australian government, including the removal of the privy council as the highest court of appeal. Australia retained the Queen as head of state.
  - In 1986, New Zealand and the United Kingdom fully separated New Zealand's governments from the influence of the Parliament of the United Kingdom, resulting in New Zealand's full independence with the Constitution Act 1986 which also reorganized the New Zealand government.
  - Independence was granted to Vanuatu from the British/French condominium (1980), Kiribati from joint US-British government (1981) and Palau from the United States (1986).
  - Zimbabwe becomes independent from official colonial rule of the United Kingdom in 1980.
  - Independence was given to Antigua and Barbuda, Belize (both 1981), and Saint Kitts and Nevis (1983) in the Caribbean; and Brunei (1984) in Southeast Asia.

=== Politics ===
==== Americas ====
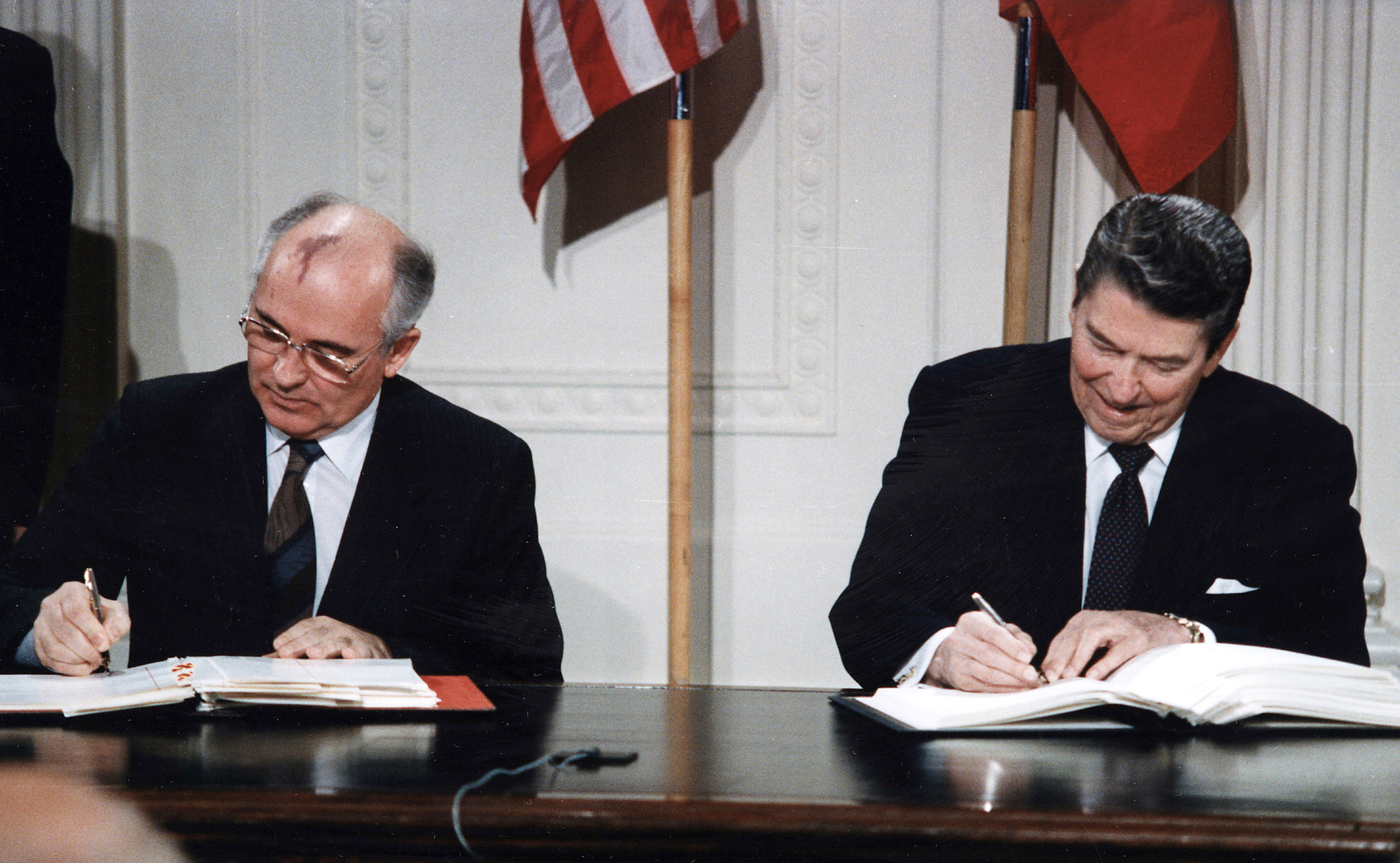
US President Reagan and Soviet General Secretary Gorbachev signing the INF Treaty, 1987

- Ronald Reagan was elected US president in 1980. In international affairs, Reagan pursued a hardline policy towards preventing the spread of communism, initiating a considerable buildup of US military power to challenge the Soviet Union. He further directly challenged the Iron Curtain by demanding that the Soviet Union dismantle the Berlin Wall.
- The Reagan Administration accelerated the war on drugs, publicized through anti-drug campaigns including the Just Say No campaign of First Lady Nancy Reagan. Drugs gained attention in the US as a serious problem in the '80s. Cocaine was relatively popular among celebrities and affluent youth, while crack, a cheaper offshoot of the drug, was linked to high crime rates in inner cities during the American crack epidemic.
- The Professional Air Traffic Controllers Organization (1968) (PATCO) declared a strike on 3 August 1981, seeking better working conditions, better pay, and a 32-hour workweek. The strike caused considerable disruption of the US air transportation system. Resolution came when Ronald Reagan fired over 11,000 striking air traffic controllers who had ignored his order to return to work, banning them from federal service for life. After seeking appeals, many of the controllers were re-hired while the FAA attempted to replace much of their air traffic control staffing. The remainder continued to be banned until President Clinton lifted the final aspects in 1993.
- Political unrest in the province of Quebec, which, due to the many differences between the dominant francophone population and the anglophone minority, and also to francophone rights in the predominantly English-speaking Canada, came to a head in 1980 when the provincial government called a public referendum on partial separation from the rest of Canada. The referendum ended with the "no" side winning majority (59.56% no, 40.44% yes).
- Military dictatorships give way to democracy in Argentina (1983), Uruguay (1984–85), Brazil (1985–1988) and Chile (1988–89). This marked the end of the Operation Condor for 30 years.

==== Europe ====
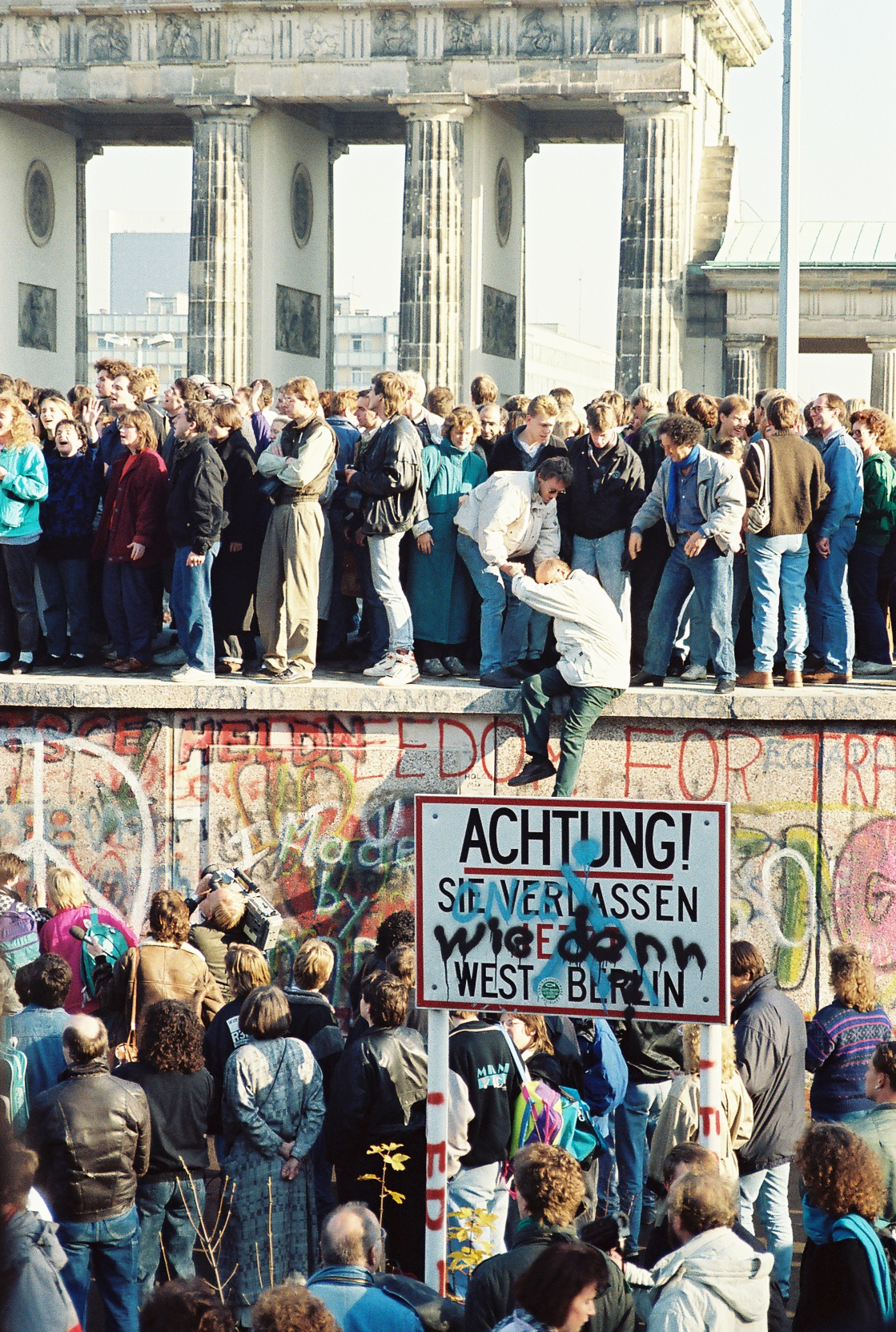
The fall of the Berlin Wall in 1989 marked the beginning of German reunification

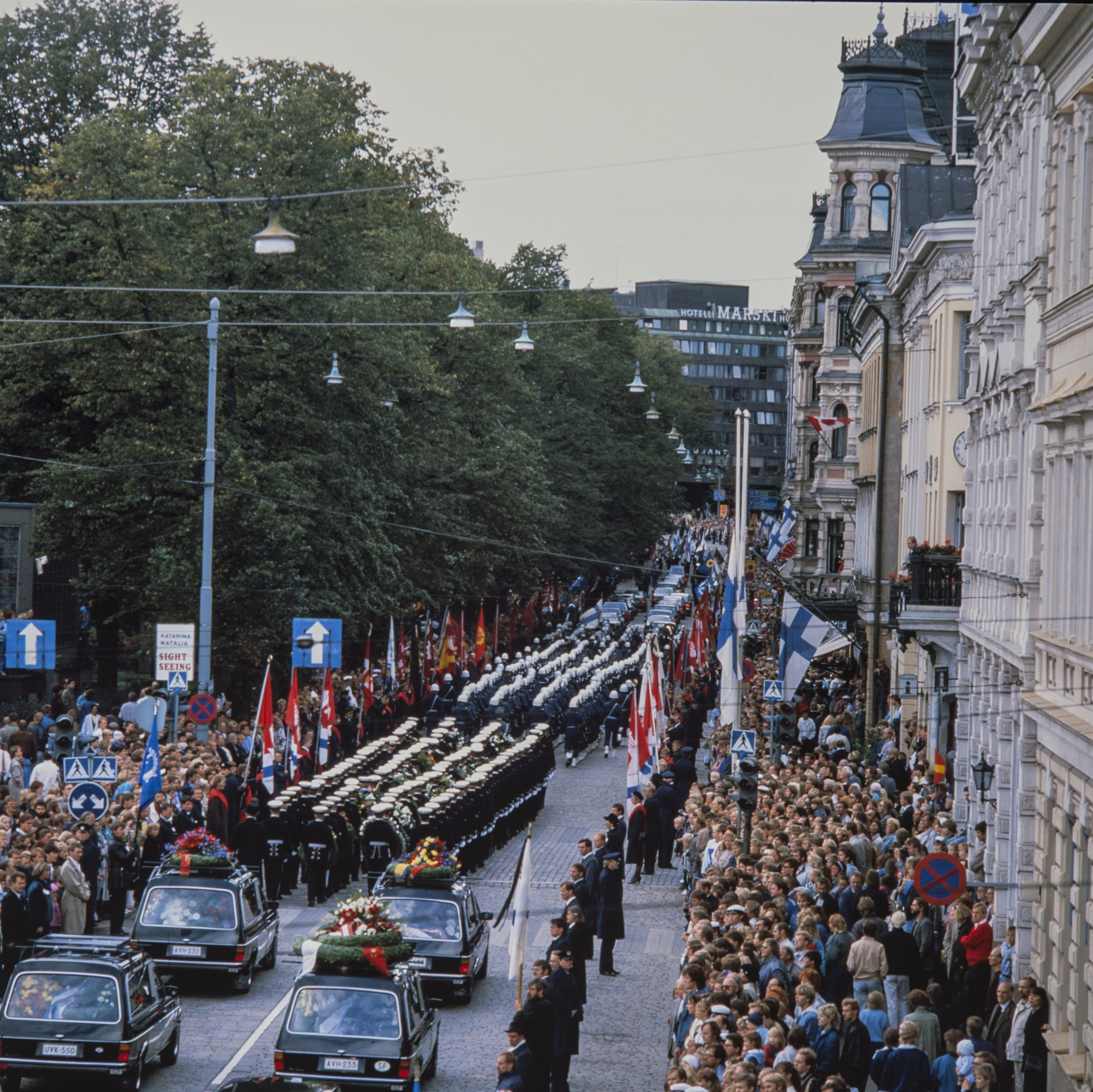
Former president of Finland from 1956 to 1982. Funeral cortege of Urho Kekkonen in Helsinki, 1986

- The European Community's enlargement continued with the accession of Greece in 1981 and Spain and Portugal in 1986.
- In 1983, Bettino Craxi became the first socialist to hold the office of Prime Minister of Italy; he remained in power until 1987, becoming one of the longest-serving Prime Ministers in the history of Italian Republic. At the end of his presidency the Mani pulite corruption scandal broke up, causing the collapse of the political system.
- Significant political reforms occurred in a number of communist countries in eastern Europe as the populations of these countries grew increasingly hostile and politically active in opposing communist governments. These reforms included attempts to increase individual liberties and market liberalization, and promises of democratic renewal. The collapse of communism in eastern Europe was generally peaceful, the exception being Romania, whose leader Nicolae Ceaușescu tried to keep the people isolated from the events happening outside the country. While making a speech in Bucharest in December 1989, he was booed and shouted down by the crowd, and then tried to flee the city with his wife Elena. Two days later, they were captured, charged with genocide, and shot on Christmas Day.
- In Yugoslavia, following the death of communist leader Josip Broz Tito in May 1980, the trend of political reform of the communist system occurred along with a trend towards ethnic nationalism and inter-ethnic hostility, especially in Serbia, beginning with the 1986 Memorandum of the Serbian Academy of Sciences and Arts followed by the agenda of Serbian communist leader Slobodan Milošević who aggressively pushed for increased political influence of Serbs in the late 1980s, condemning non-Serb Yugoslav politicians who challenged his agenda as being enemies of Serbs.
- There was continuing civil strife in Northern Ireland, including the adoption of hunger strikes by Irish Republican Army prisoners seeking the reintroduction of political status.
- Mikhail Gorbachev became leader of the Soviet Union in 1985, and initiated major reforms to the Soviet Union's government through increasing the rights of expressing political dissent and opening elections to opposition candidates (while maintaining legal dominance of the Communist Party). Gorbachev pursued negotiation with the United States to decrease tensions and eventually end the Cold War.
- During the Revolutions of 1989, most of the communist governments in Eastern Europe collapsed. The fall of the Berlin Wall in 1989 would be followed in 1990 by the German reunification.
- The United Kingdom was governed by the Conservative Party under Prime Minister Margaret Thatcher, the first female leader of a Western country. Under her Premiership, the party introduced widespread economic reforms including the privatisation of industries and the de-regulation of listed shares markets echoing similar reforms of US President Ronald Reagan. She was also a staunch opponent of communism, earning her the nickname The Iron Lady.
- Poor industrial relations marked the beginning of the decade; the UK miners' strike (1984–85) was a major industrial action affecting the UK coal industry. The strike by the National Union of Mineworkers (NUM) was led by Arthur Scargill, although some NUM members considered it to be unconstitutional and did not observe it. The BBC has referred to the strike as "the most bitter industrial dispute in British history." At its height, the strike involved 142,000 mineworkers, making it the biggest since the 1926 General Strike.
- In November 1982, Leonid Brezhnev, who had led the Soviet Union since 1964, died. He was followed in quick succession by Yuri Andropov, the former KGB chief, and Konstantin Chernenko, both of whom were in poor health during their short tenures in office.
- Presidents of France were Valéry Giscard d'Estaing and François Mitterrand. The Chancellors of West Germany were Helmut Schmidt and Helmut Kohl.

==== Asia ====
- The Prime Ministers of Japan were Masayoshi Ōhira, Zenkō Suzuki, Yasuhiro Nakasone, Noboru Takeshita, Sōsuke Uno and Toshiki Kaifu.
- Following the assassination of Park Chung-hee, South Korean president Chun Doo Hwan came to power at the end of 1979 and ruled as a dictator until his presidential term expired in 1987. He was responsible for the Gwangju Uprising in May 1980 when police and soldiers battled armed protesters. Relations with North Korea showed little sign of improvement during the 1980s. In 1983, when Chun was in Burma, a bomb apparently planted by North Korean agents killed a number of South Korean government officials. The June Democratic Struggle in 1987, a nationwide pro-democracy movement in South Korea, leads to democratic reforms, an end to authoritarian rule and democratic elections. After leaving office, Chun was succeeded by Roh Tae Woo, the first democratic ruler of the country, which saw its international prestige greatly rise with hosting the Olympics in 1988. Roh pursued a policy of normalizing relations with China and the Soviet Union, but had to face militant left-wing student groups who demanded reunification with North Korea and the withdrawal of US troops.
- In the Philippines, after 20 years of dictatorship, Philippine president Ferdinand Marcos was ousted from power, fleeing with Imelda Marcos and their children to Hawaii and replaced by Corazon Aquino through the non-violent People Power Revolution from 22 to 25 February 1986.
- Democratization in South Korea and Taiwan, having lasted 42 and 27 years under the authoritarian regime since the end of World War II and the Korean War (including the lifting of martial law in Taiwan and the first direct presidential elections in South Korea).
- The 1988 Summer Olympics were held in South Korea, the first time the country hosted them.

Africa

- A widespread famine hit Ethiopia from 1983 to 1985, affecting 7.75 million people, killing around 300,000 to 1.2 million. 400,000 refugees left the country. Blame for the famine has been attributed to drought, Ethiopia's civil war, and policies taken by the Derg military regime.

== Assassinations and attempts ==
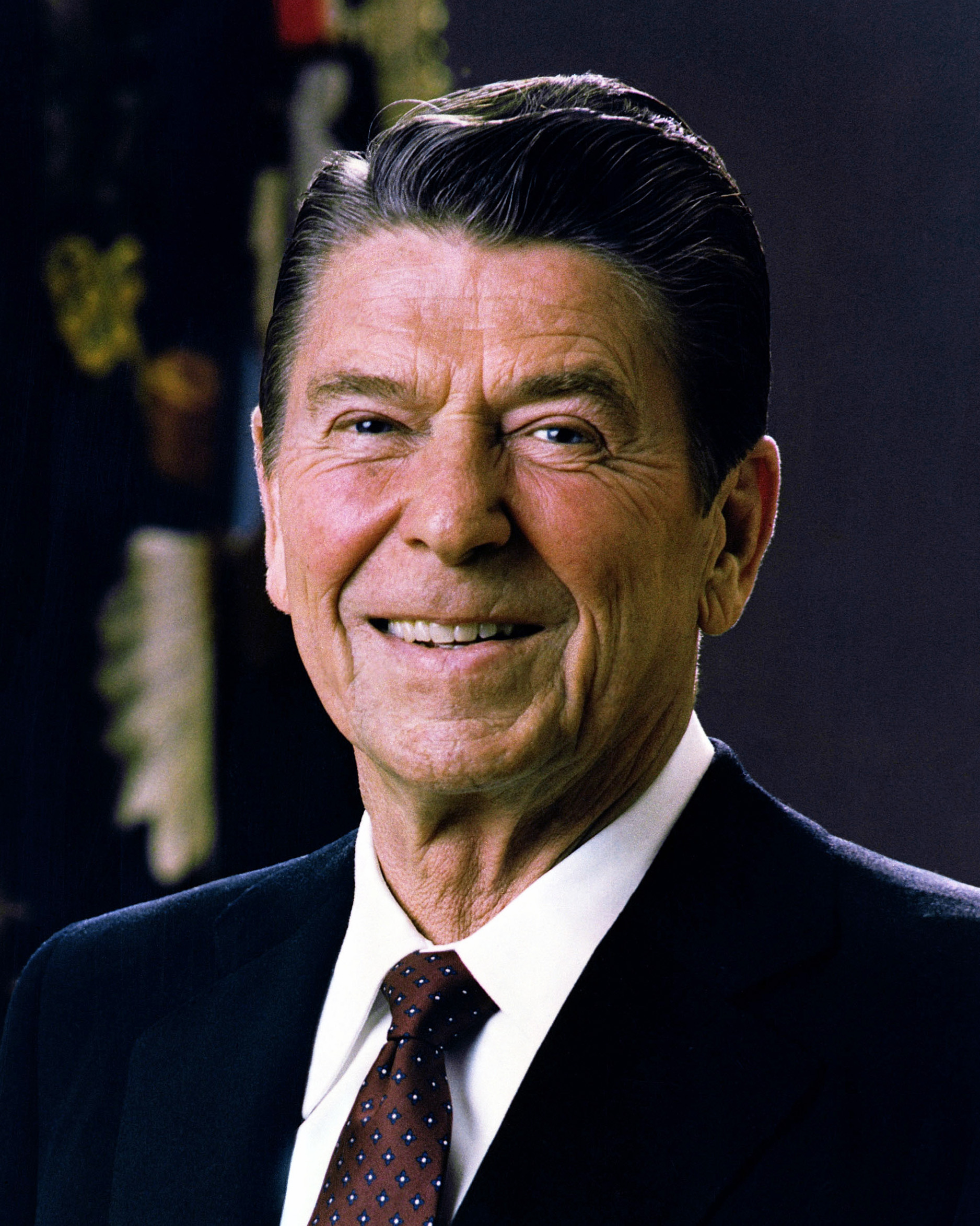
Ronald Reagan

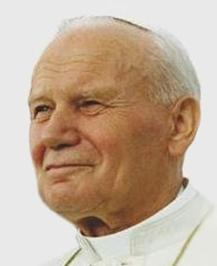
Pope John Paul II

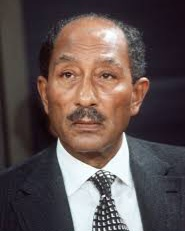
Anwar Sadat

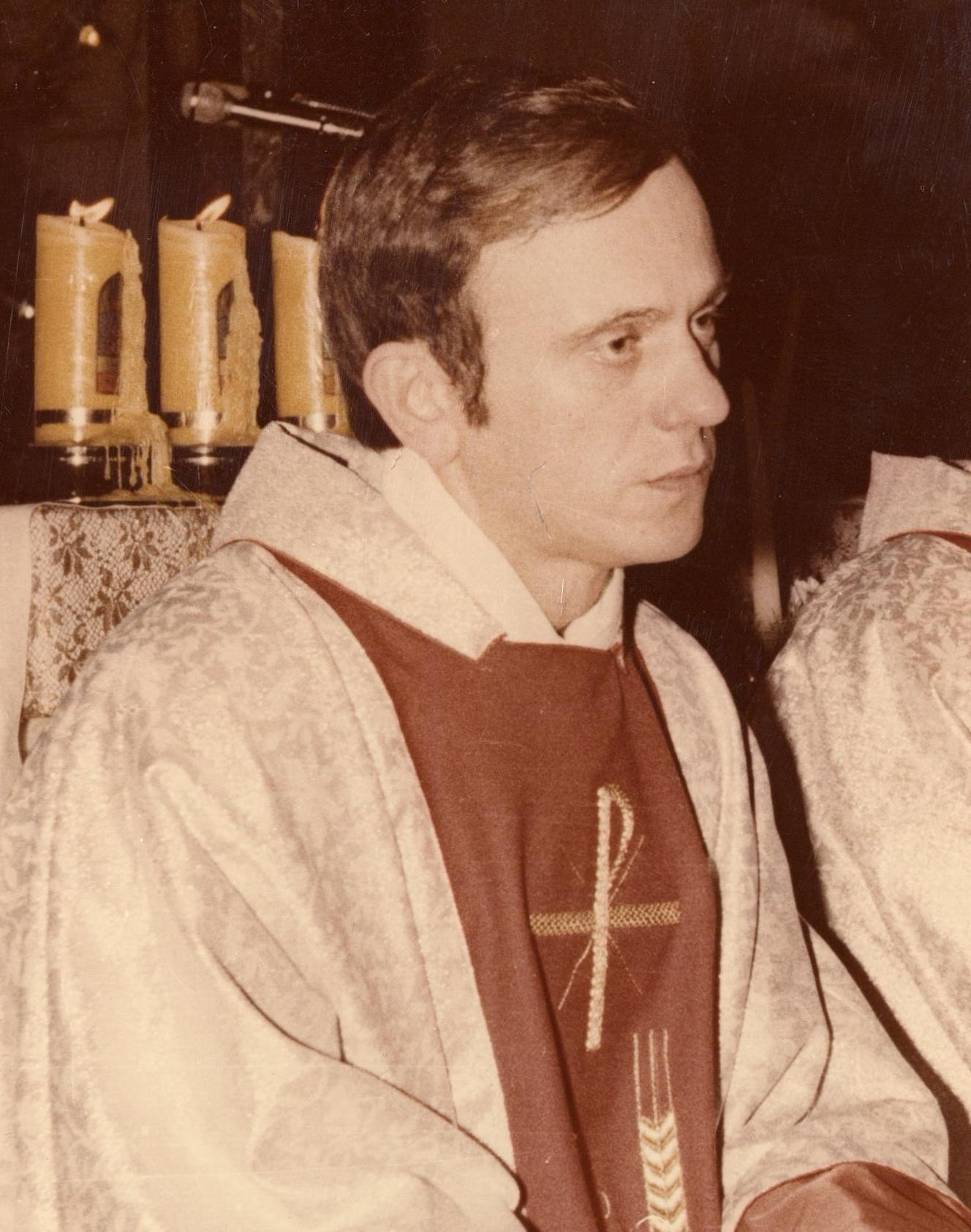
Father Jerzy Popiełuszko

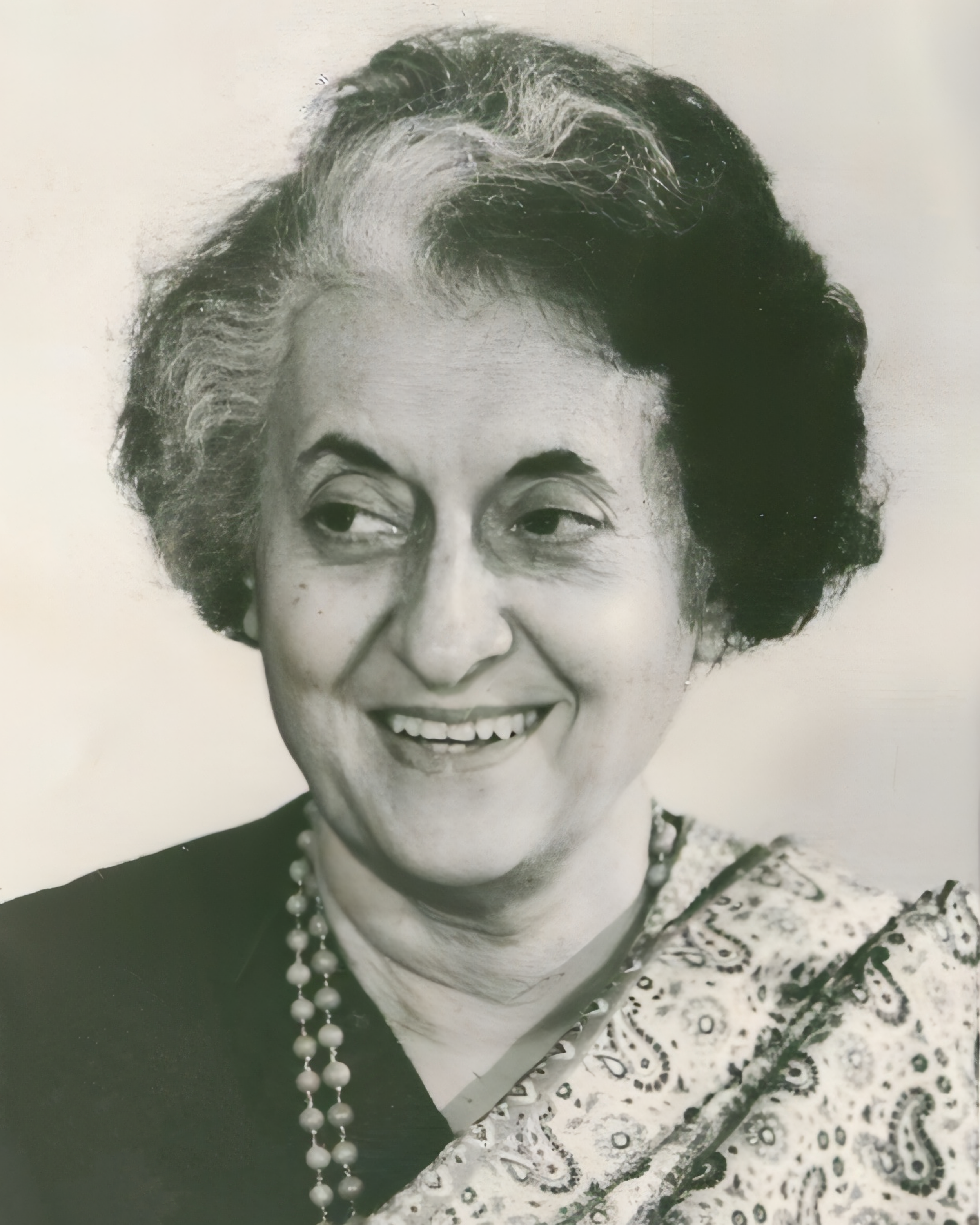
Indira Gandhi

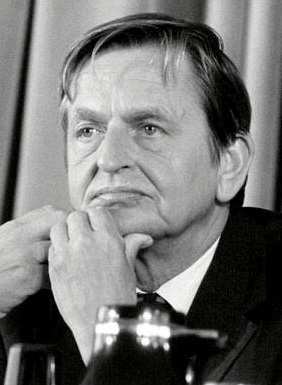
Olof Palme

Prominent assassinations, targeted killings, and assassination attempts include:

Date	Description
12 April 1980	William R. Tolbert Jr., 20th President of Liberia, is killed during a military coup. His death marks the end of Americo-Liberian rule in Liberia.
December 8, 1980	John Lennon, British musician and political activist, formerly of the Beatles, is assassinated by Mark David Chapman outside the Dakota.
December 16, 1980	Jose B. Lingad, Filipino politician and former congressman, is assassinated at a gas station in San Fernando, Pampanga by Constabulary officer Roberto Tabanero while his electoral protest in the 1980 Pampanga gubernatorial election was pending before the Commission on Elections.
30 March 1981	Ronald Reagan, 40th President of the United States, was shot in Washington, D.C. by a mentally disturbed individual. Reagan's press secretary, James Brady, was also shot, along with a police officer and a US Secret Service agent.
13 May 1981	Pope John Paul II is shot and wounded in Saint Peter's Square.
30 May 1981	Ziaur Rahman, the sixth president of Bangladesh, was assassinated by a faction of officers of Bangladesh Army, in the southeastern port city of Chittagong.
30 August 1981	Mohammad-Ali Rajai, second President of Iran and Mohammad-Javad Bahonar, 48th Prime Minister of Iran, are both killed when a bomb explodes in Bahonar's office. Iranian officials allege the bomb was planted by elements of the People's Mujahedin of Iran, though others allege the bombing was orchestrated by political rivals within the Islamic Republican Party.
6 October 1981	Anwar Sadat, third President of Egypt, is assassinated at a military parade in Cairo.
21 July 1982	Emmanuel Pelaez, 6th Vice President of the Philippines, is shot and wounded near his residence in New Manila, Quezon City.
21 August 1983	Benigno Aquino Jr., a longtime political opponent of Philippine president Ferdinand Marcos, is killed after landing in the Philippines after three years of self-imposed exile.
12 October 1984	Margaret Thatcher, Prime Minister of the United Kingdom, avoids being the target of a bombing at a hotel orchestrated by the Provisional Irish Republican Army. The blast does kill five including Anthony Berry, an MP and Deputy Chief Whip.
19 October 1984	Jerzy Popiełuszko, a Polish Catholic priest and a chaplain of Solidarity, is assassinated at Włocławek, and his body is thrown into the Vistula River in Poland.
31 October 1984	Indira Gandhi, third Prime Minister of India, is assassinated by her own bodyguards in response to the Indian Army's attack on Golden Temple to destroy Sikh Militant stronghold in Amritsar earlier in the decade.
11 February 1986	Evelio Javier, 80th Governor of Antique, Philippines, is assassinated in front of the Antique Provincial Capitol building by masked gunmen after serving as Corazon Aquino's provincial campaign director in the 1986 presidential election.
28 February 1986	Olof Palme, Prime Minister of Sweden, is assassinated while walking home from a cinema in Stockholm.
15 October 1987	Thomas Sankara, 1st President of Burkina Faso, is assassinated in a coup organized by his former colleague, Blaise Compaoré.

== Disasters ==
=== Natural disasters ===
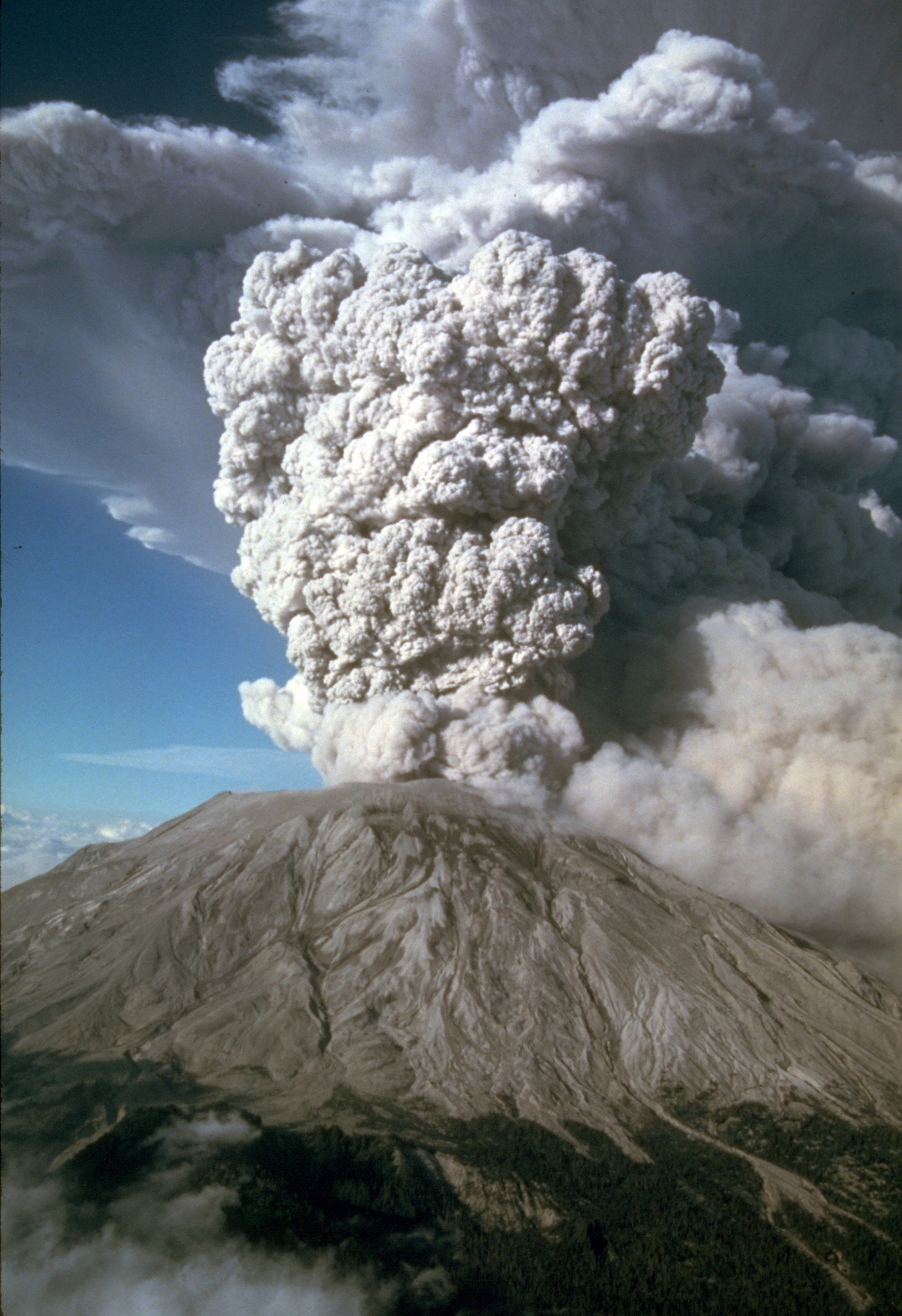
1980 eruption of Mount St. Helens

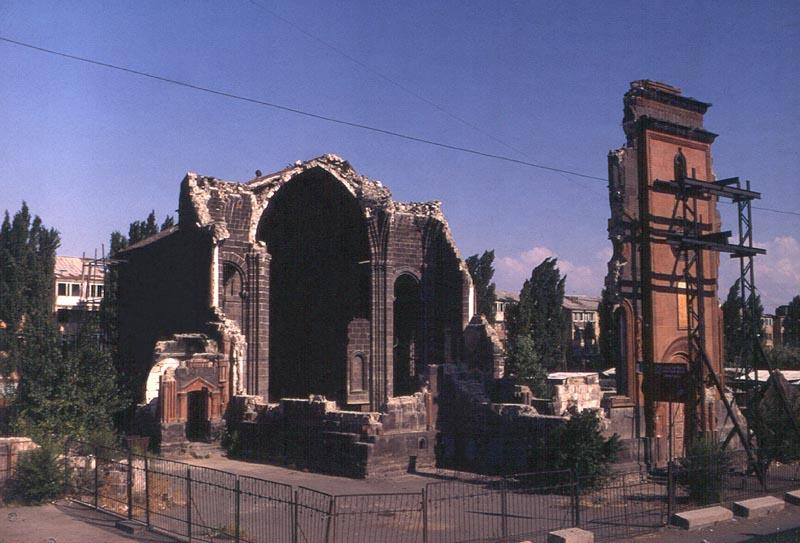
The Holy Saviour's Church in Gyumri after the Spitak earthquake

- Mount St. Helens erupted in Washington, US on 18 May 1980, killing 57 people.
- HIV/AIDS, a global pandemic that has killed over 40 million people, was identified in the 1980s, with the first reported cases in 1981.
- On 17 October 1989, the Loma Prieta earthquake struck the San Francisco Bay Area during game three of the 1989 World Series, gaining worldwide attention. Sixty-five people were killed and thousands injured, with major structural damage on freeways and buildings and broken gas-line fires in San Francisco, California. The cost of the damage totaled US$13 billion (1989 US$).
- The 1988–89 North American drought decimated the US with many parts of the country affected. This was the worst drought to hit the United States in many years. The drought caused $60 billion in damage (between $80 billion and $120 billion for 2008 US$). The concurrent heat waves killed 5,800 to 17,000 people in the United States.
- Hurricane Allen (1980), Hurricane Alicia (1983), Hurricane Gilbert (1988), Hurricane Joan (1988), and Hurricane Hugo (1989) were some notably destructive Atlantic hurricanes of the 1980s.
- Other natural disasters of the 1980s include the 1982–1983 El Niño which brought destructive weather to most of the world; the 1985 Mexico City earthquake, which registered 8.0 on the moment magnitude scale and devastated Mexico City and other areas throughout central Mexico; the 1985 Nevado del Ruiz lahar in Colombia; the 1986 Lake Nyos limnic eruption in Cameroon; and the 1988 Armenian earthquake, which rocked the Caucasus region of the USSR.

=== Non-natural disasters ===
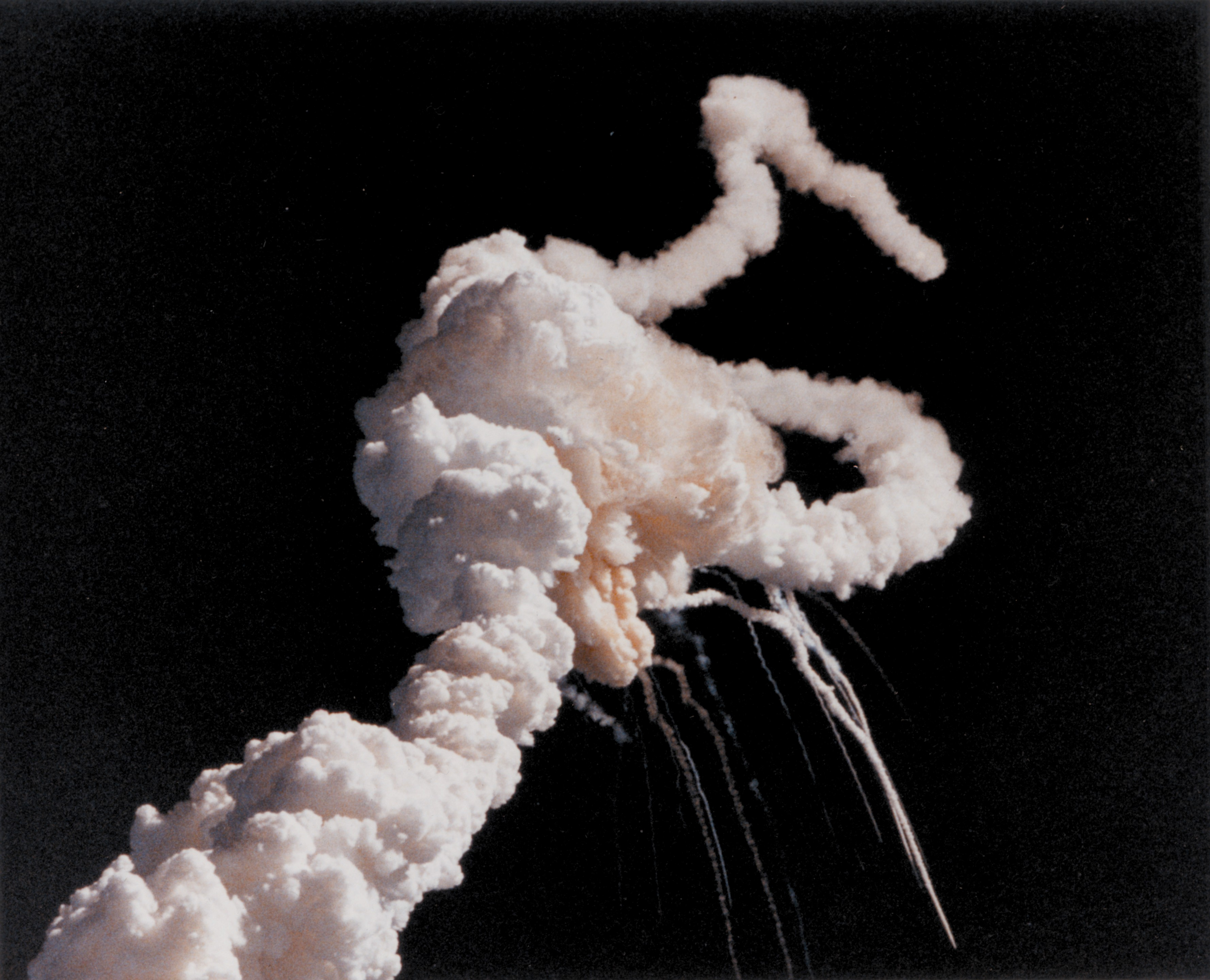
The space shuttle Challenger disintegrates on January 28, 1986

- In 1980, Dan-Air Flight 1008, a Boeing 727, crashed on approach to Tenerife in the Canary Islands, killing 146 people on board.
- In 1980, Saudia Flight 163, a Lockheed L-1011 TriStar, caught fire moments after takeoff from the Saudi Arabian capital of Riyadh. The flight immediately returned to the airport, but evacuation of the plane was delayed and all 301 people aboard died.
- In 1982, Pan Am Flight 759, a Boeing 727, was forced down by microburst while on approach to New Orleans International Airport, killing 153 people.
- In 1983, Korean Air Lines Flight 007, a Boeing 747 carrying 269 people between New York City and Seoul via Anchorage, was shot down by Soviet fighter jets after accidentally straying into Soviet prohibited airspace, killing everyone on board.
- In 1984, the Bhopal disaster resulted from a toxic methyl isocyanate (MIC) gas leak at the Union Carbide plant in Bhopal, India, killing 3,000 immediately and ultimately claiming 15,000–20,000 lives.
- In 1985, the Heysel Stadium disaster occurred before the European Cup final in Brussels, Belgium, when a crowd crush led to 39 deaths and 600 injuries.
- In 1985, Air India Flight 182, a Boeing 747 flying from Montreal to Bombay via London and Delhi, is blown up over Irish waters by a bomb planted by Sikh separatists, killing all 320 passengers and crew on board. This was the deadliest act of aviation terrorism until the September 11 attacks of 2001.
- In 1985, Delta Air Lines Flight 191, a Lockheed L-1011 TriStar, crashed on approach to Dallas/Fort Worth International Airport in Texas due to a microburst. 137 people were killed while 27 survived.
- Japan Air Lines Flight 123, a Boeing 747 carrying 524 people, crashed in 1985, while on a flight from Tokyo to Osaka, killing 520 of the people on board, leaving four survivors. This was the deadliest single-aircraft crash to date.
- In 1985, Arrow Air Flight 1285R, a Douglas DC-8, stalled and crashed seconds after taking off from Gander, Newfoundland. All 256 people on board, many of them US servicemen returning home from duty overseas, perished.
- In 1986, the NASA Space Shuttle Challenger disintegrated 73 seconds after launch, killing all of the crew on board. This was the first disaster involving the destruction of a NASA Space Shuttle. A faulty O-ring was the cause of the accident.
- On 26 April 1986, the Chernobyl disaster, a large-scale nuclear meltdown in the Ukrainian SSR, Soviet Union, spread a large amount of radioactive material across Europe, killing 47 people, dooming countless others to future radiation-related cancer, and causing the displacement of 300,000 people.
- In 1986, Aeroméxico Flight 498, a Douglas DC-9, crashed after colliding with a private Piper Cherokee over Cerritos, California, killing 64 on both aircraft and 15 others on the ground. On the same day, the Soviet passenger ship Admiral Nakhimov sank after colliding with the bulk carrier Pyotr Vasev in the Black Sea, killing 423 people.
- In 1987, LOT Flight 5055, an Ilyushin Il-62M caught fire due to an uncontained engine failure and subsequently crashed, killing all 183 passengers and crew.
- In 1987, Northwest Airlines Flight 255, a McDonnell Douglas MD-82, crashed almost immediately after takeoff Detroit Wayne Airport in Michigan due to pilot error, killing 156 on board.
- In 1987, a fire broke out on South African Airways Flight 295, a Boeing 747, eventually causing the aircraft to crash into the Indian Ocean. All 159 aboard were killed.
- On 20 December 1987, the Philippine passenger ferry Doña Paz burned and sank after colliding with the oil tanker MT Vector off the island of Marinduque. With an estimated death toll of over 4,000, this was and remains the world's deadliest peacetime maritime disaster.
- In 1988, Iran Air Flight 655, an Airbus A300 en route from Tehran to Dubai via Bandar Abbas, was shot down by the US missile cruiser USS Vincennes over the Strait of Hormuz, killing all 290 people on the plane. The event is one of the most controversial aviation occurrences of all time, with the true cause disputed between the Americans and the Iranians.
- In 1988, Pan Am Flight 103, a Boeing 747 en route from Frankfurt to Detroit (via London and New York), was destroyed by a bomb while it was flying over Lockerbie, Scotland, killing the 259 passengers and crew members on board and 11 people on the ground. This was the worst terrorist attack to have occurred on British soil.
- On 24 March 1989, the oil tanker Exxon Valdez ran aground on Bligh Reef in Alaska's Prince William Sound spilling an estimated equivalent of 260,000 to 750,000 barrels of crude oil. Although not among the largest oil spills in history, its remote and sensitive location made it one of the most devastating ecological disasters, with after-effects continuing to be felt present-day.
- In 1989, the Hillsborough disaster occurs during a FA Cup semi-final in Sheffield, England, fatally crushing 96 football fans and injuring nearly 1,000 more.
- In 1989, United Airlines Flight 232, a McDonnell Douglas DC-10 carrying 296 people, suffered an in-flight engine failure and was forced to crash-land at Sioux City, Iowa. 185 survived, while 111 were killed when the plane burst into flames upon touchdown.

== Science and technology ==
=== Medicine and biology ===
The 1980s had many fundamental advances in medicine and biology. The first surrogate pregnancy of an unrelated child took place on 13 April 1986, in Michigan. The first genetically modified crops, tobacco (Nicotiana) plants were grown in China in 1988.

Gene therapy techniques became established by the end of the 1980s, allowing gene tagging and gene therapy to become a possibility, both of which were first performed in human beings in May 1989 and September 1990, respectively.

=== Electronics and computers ===
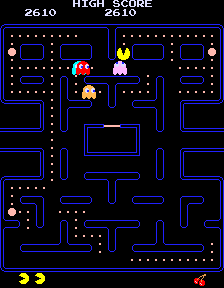
Pac-Man (1980) quickly became one of the most famous video games of all time.

Arcade and video games had been growing in popularity since the late 1970s, and by 1982 were a major industry. In the United States, a variety of factors, including a glut of low-quality games and the rise of home computers, caused a tremendous crash in late 1983. For the next three years, the video game market practically ceased to exist in the US. But in the second half of the decade, it would be revived by Nintendo, whose Famicom console and mascot Mario had been enjoying considerable success in Japan, which did not have an equivalent crash, since 1983. Renamed the Nintendo Entertainment System (NES), it would claim 90% of the American video game market by 1989.

In 1980, Pac-Man was introduced to arcades, and became one of the most popular video games of all time. Also in 1980, Game & Watch was created; it was not one of the best known game systems, but it facilitated mini-games and was concurrent with the NES. Donkey Kong, released in 1981, was a smash arcade hit and market breakthrough for Nintendo. Super Mario Bros., Duck Hunt, Dragon Quest, The Legend of Zelda, and the Mega Man series would become major hits for the console.

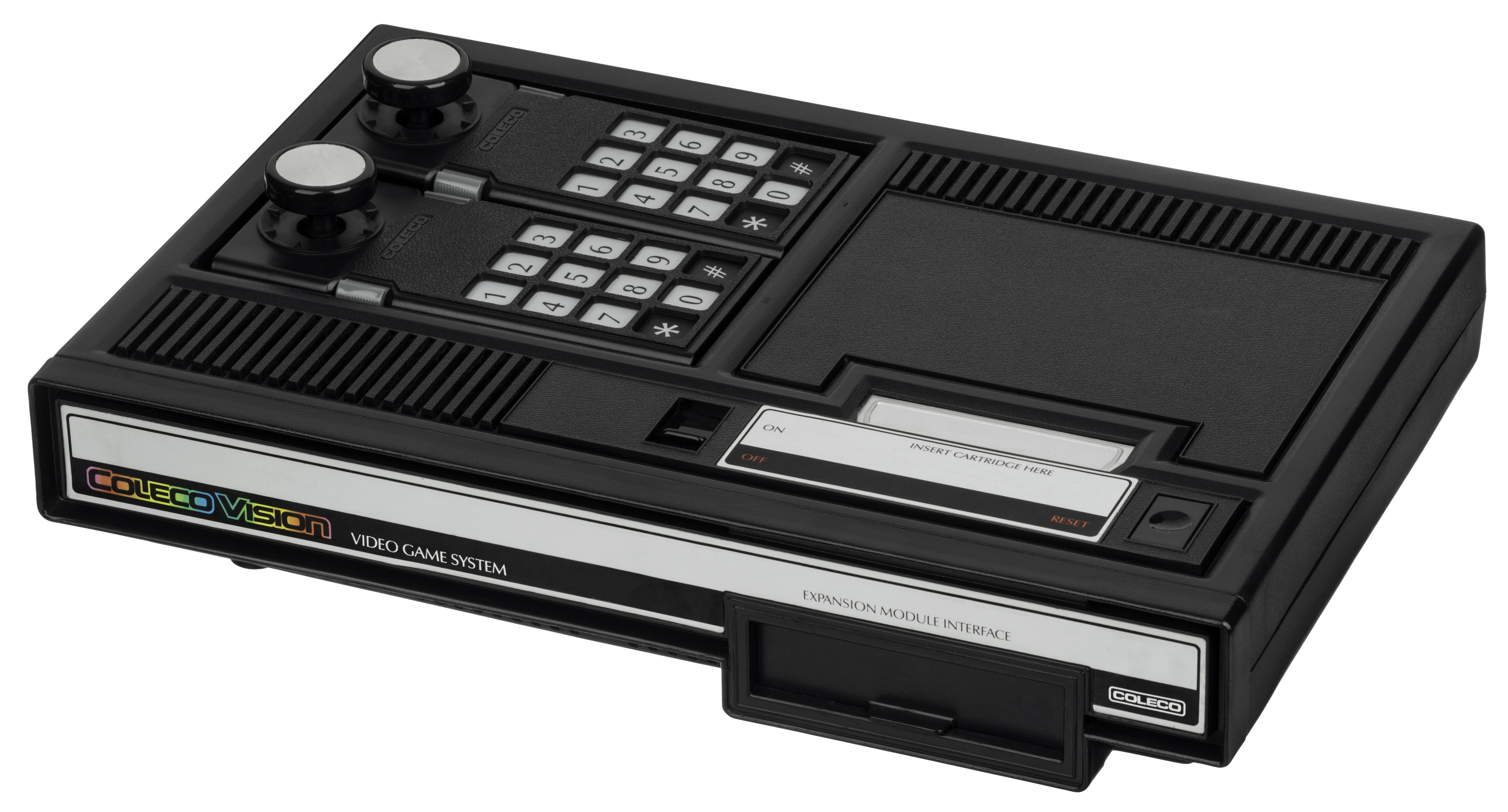
The ColecoVision video game System.

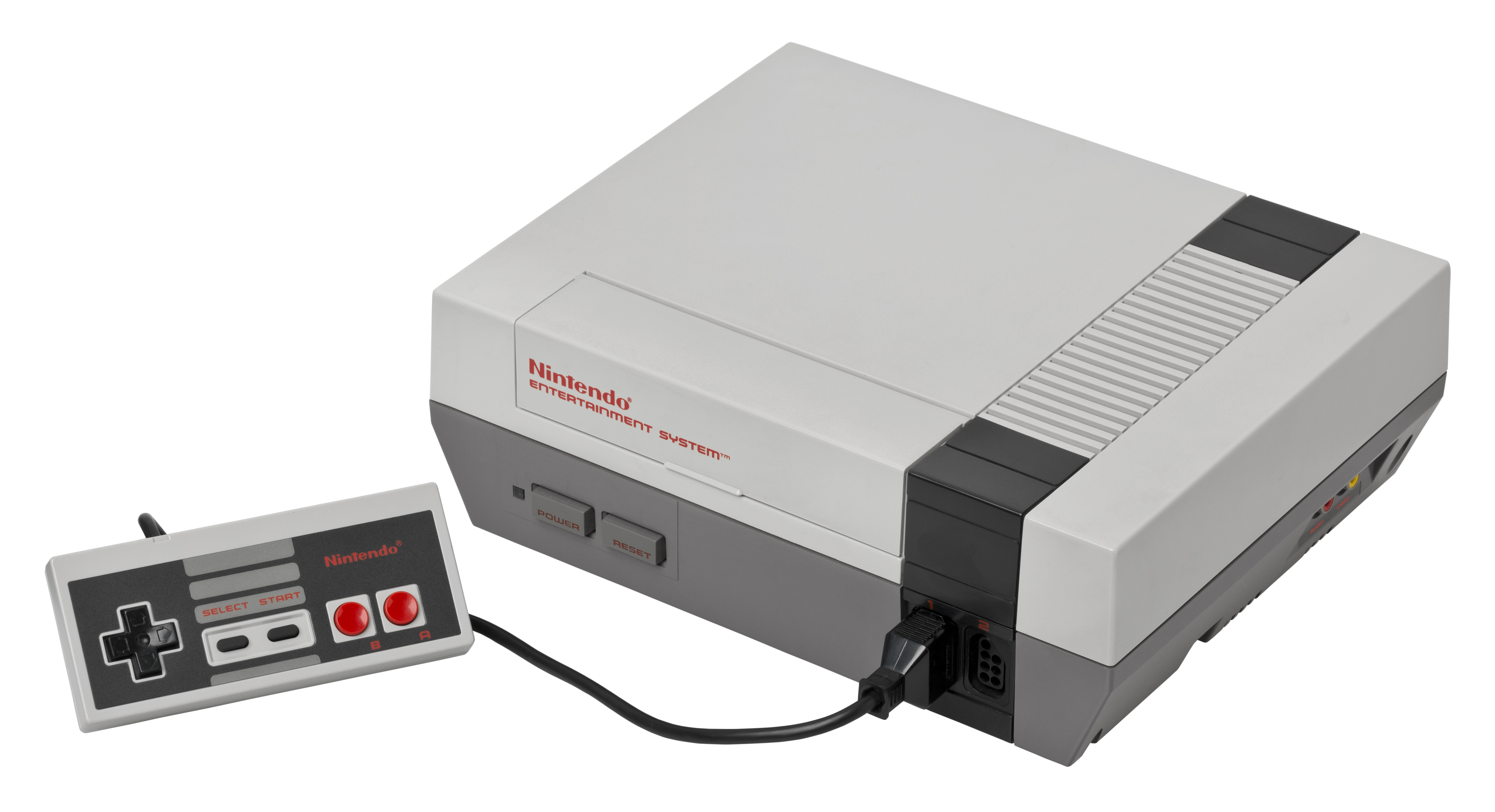
The Nintendo Entertainment System's Control Deck.

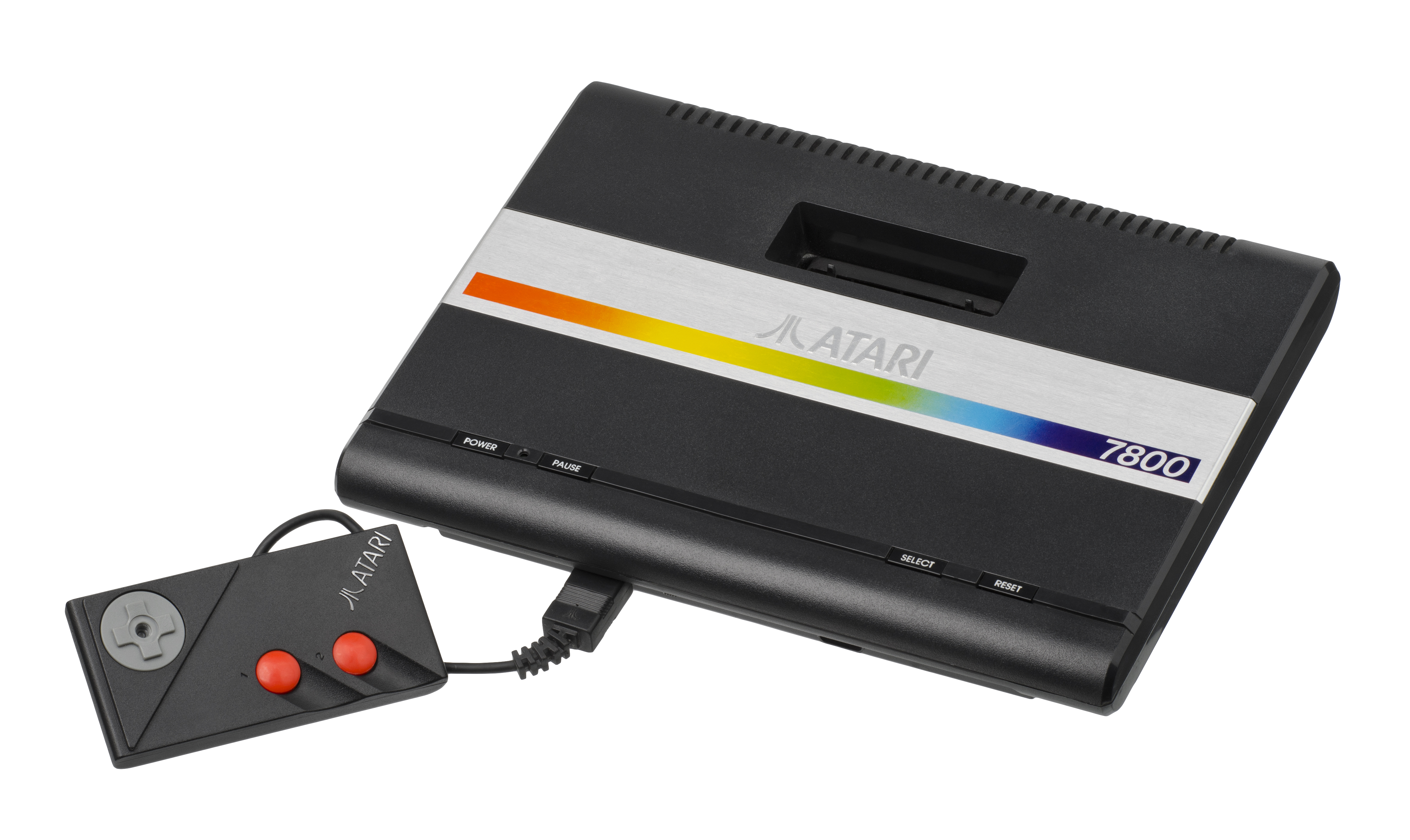
Atari 7800 System (PAL system with joypad controller).

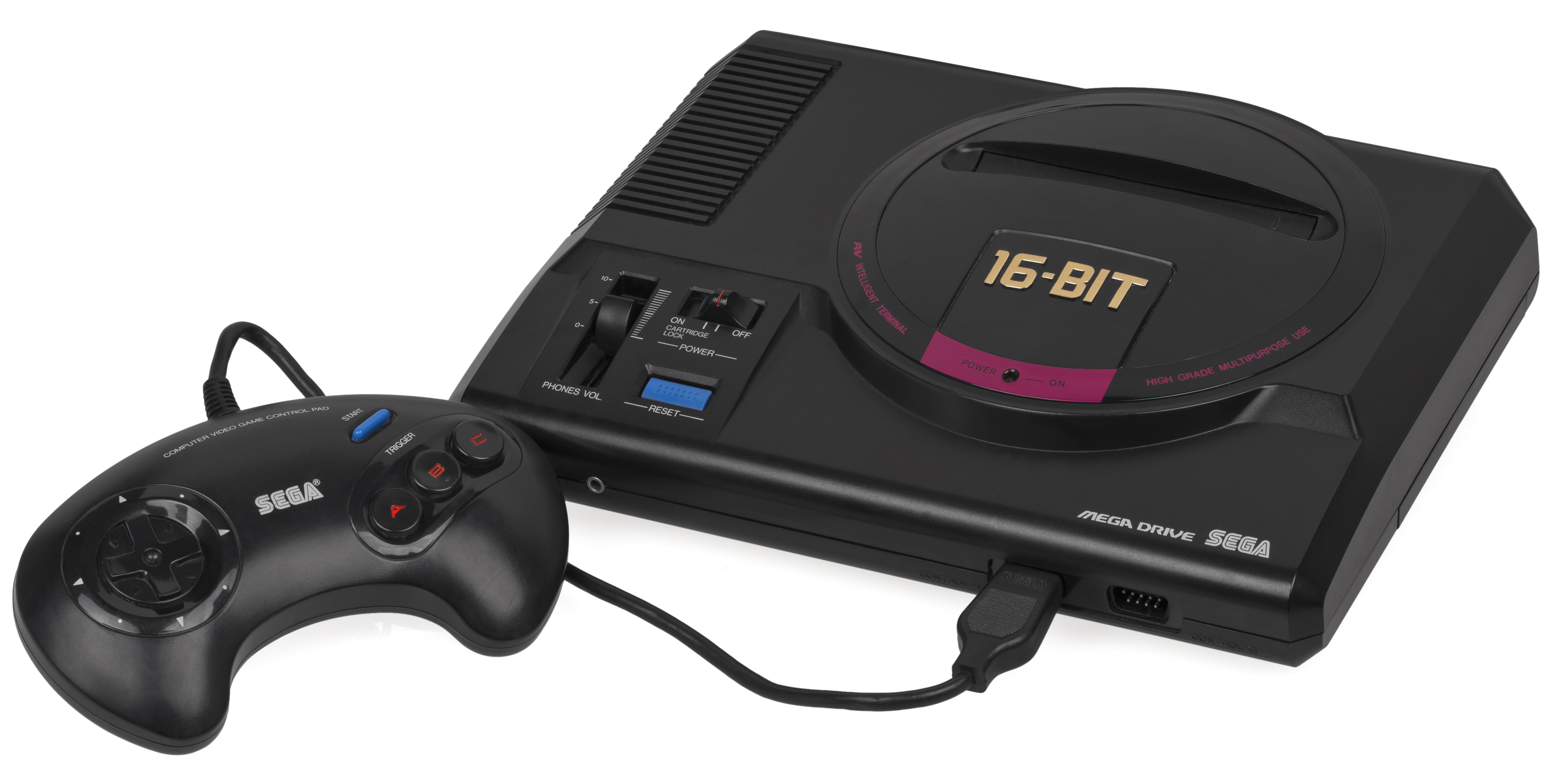
Mega Drive, known as the Genesis in North America, succeeded the Master System.

The personal computer experienced explosive growth in the 1980s, transitioning from a hobbyist's toy to a full-fledged consumer product. The IBM PC, launched in 1981, became the dominant computer for professional users. Commodore created the most popular home computers of both 8-bit and 16-bit generations. MSX standard was the dominant computer platform in Japan and in most parts of Asia. Apple Computer superseded its Apple II and Lisa models by introducing the first Macintosh computer in 1984. It was the first commercially successful personal computer to use a graphical user interface (GUI) and mouse, which started to become general features in computers after the middle of the decade. Electronics and computers were also at the forefront of the advertising industry, with many commercials like "1984" from Apple achieving acclaim and pop-culture relevance.

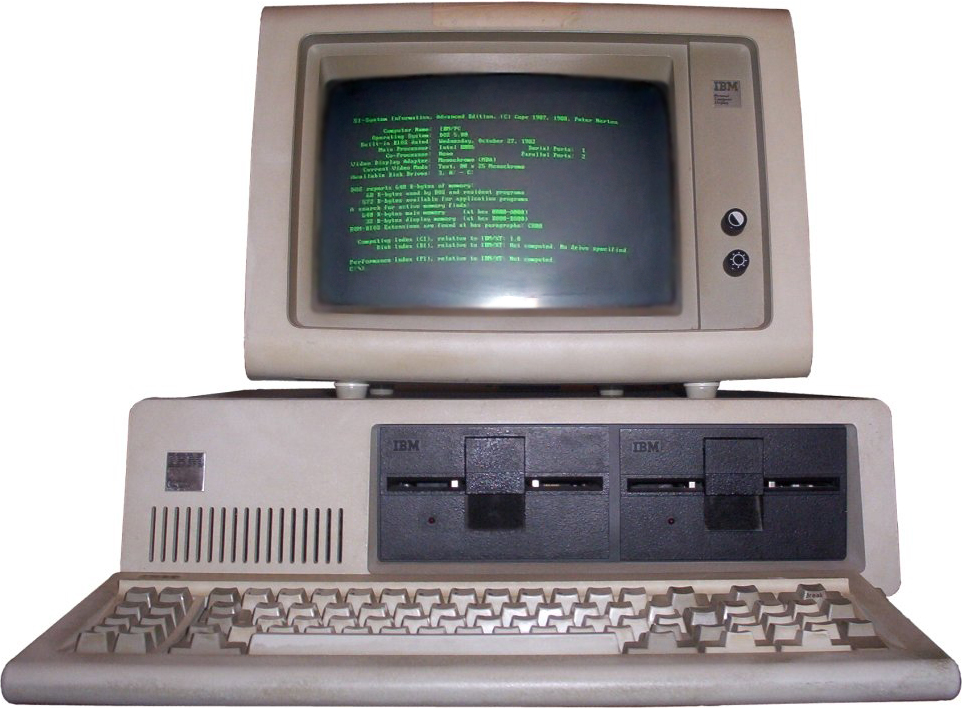
The IBM PC (model 5150) was released in 1981. It and compatible systems would become the most widely used computers in the world.

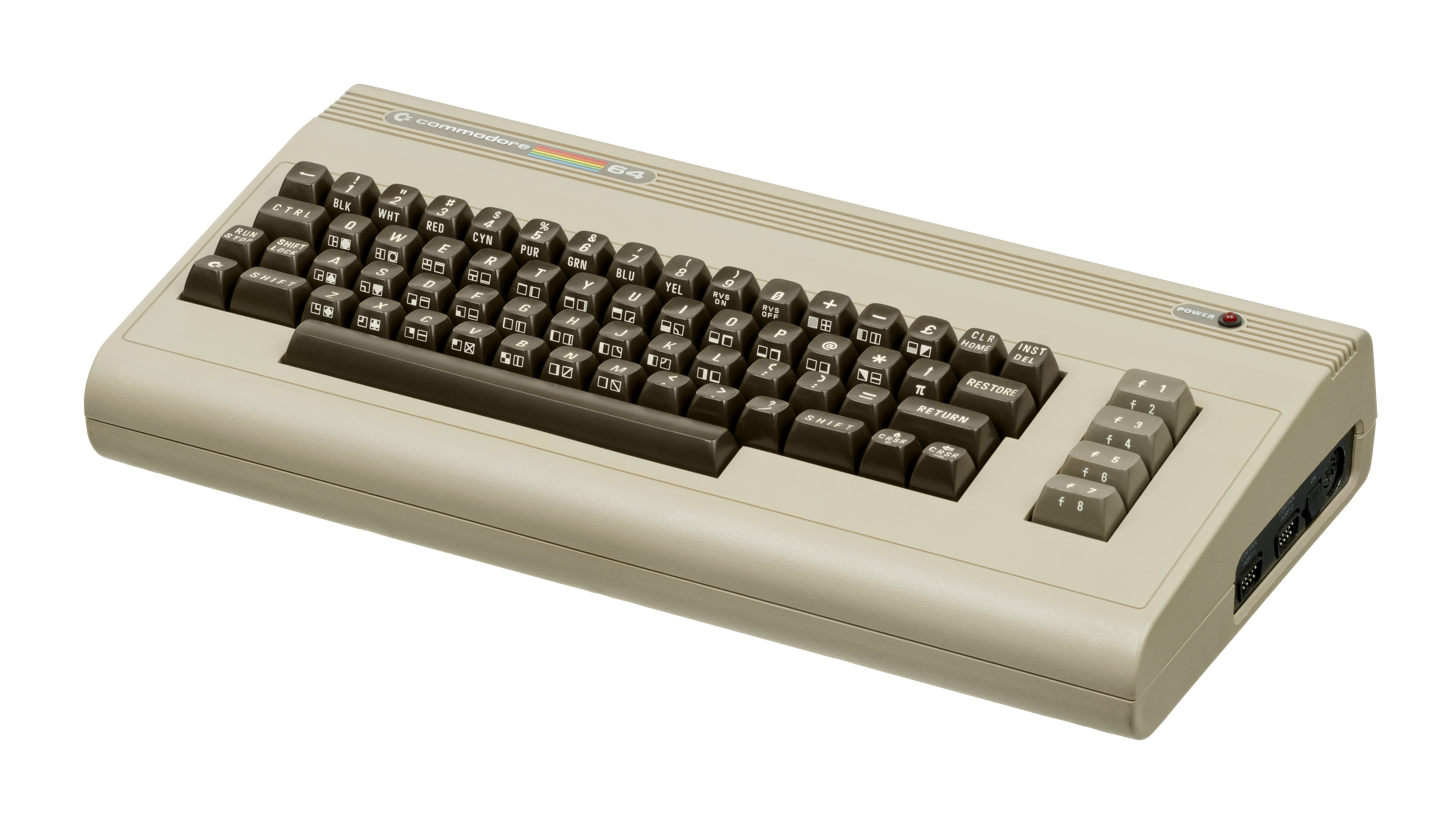
The Commodore 64, with sales estimated at more than 17 million units between 1982 and 1994 became the best-selling computer model of all time.

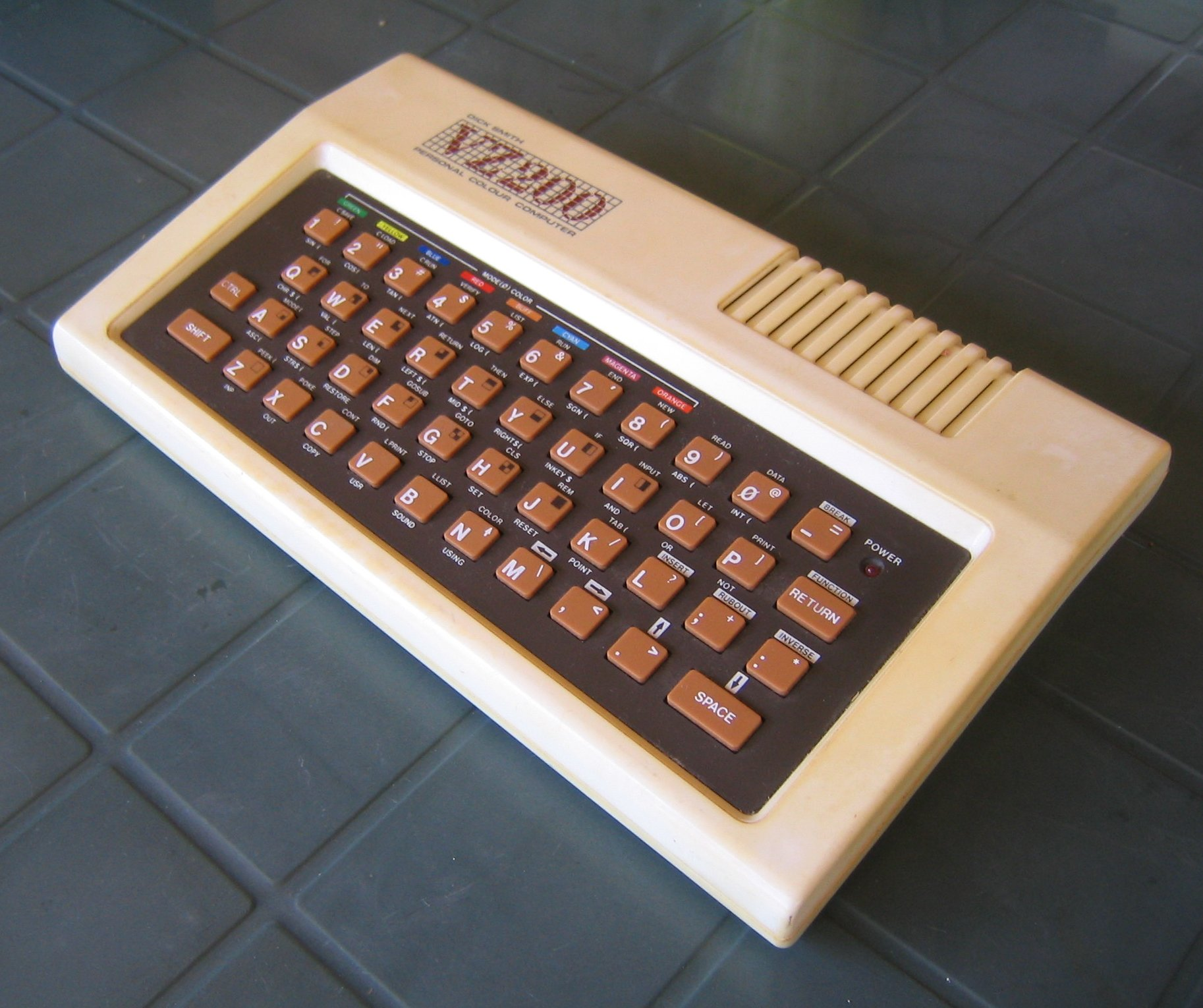
VTech Laser 200, 8-bit home computer from 1983

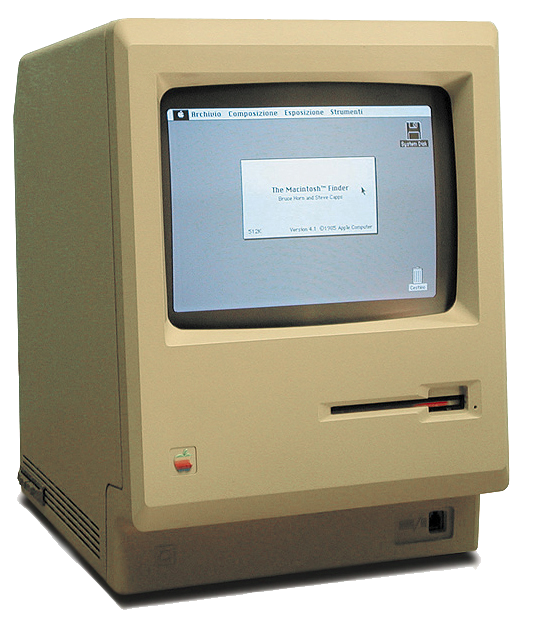
The Macintosh 128K, the first commercially successful personal computer to use a graphical user interface, was introduced to the public in 1984.

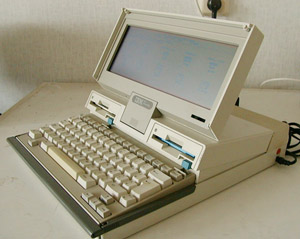
The IBM PC Convertible (model 5140; 1986), the first IBM PC compatible laptop and the first to use to use 3 1/2-inch floppy disks.

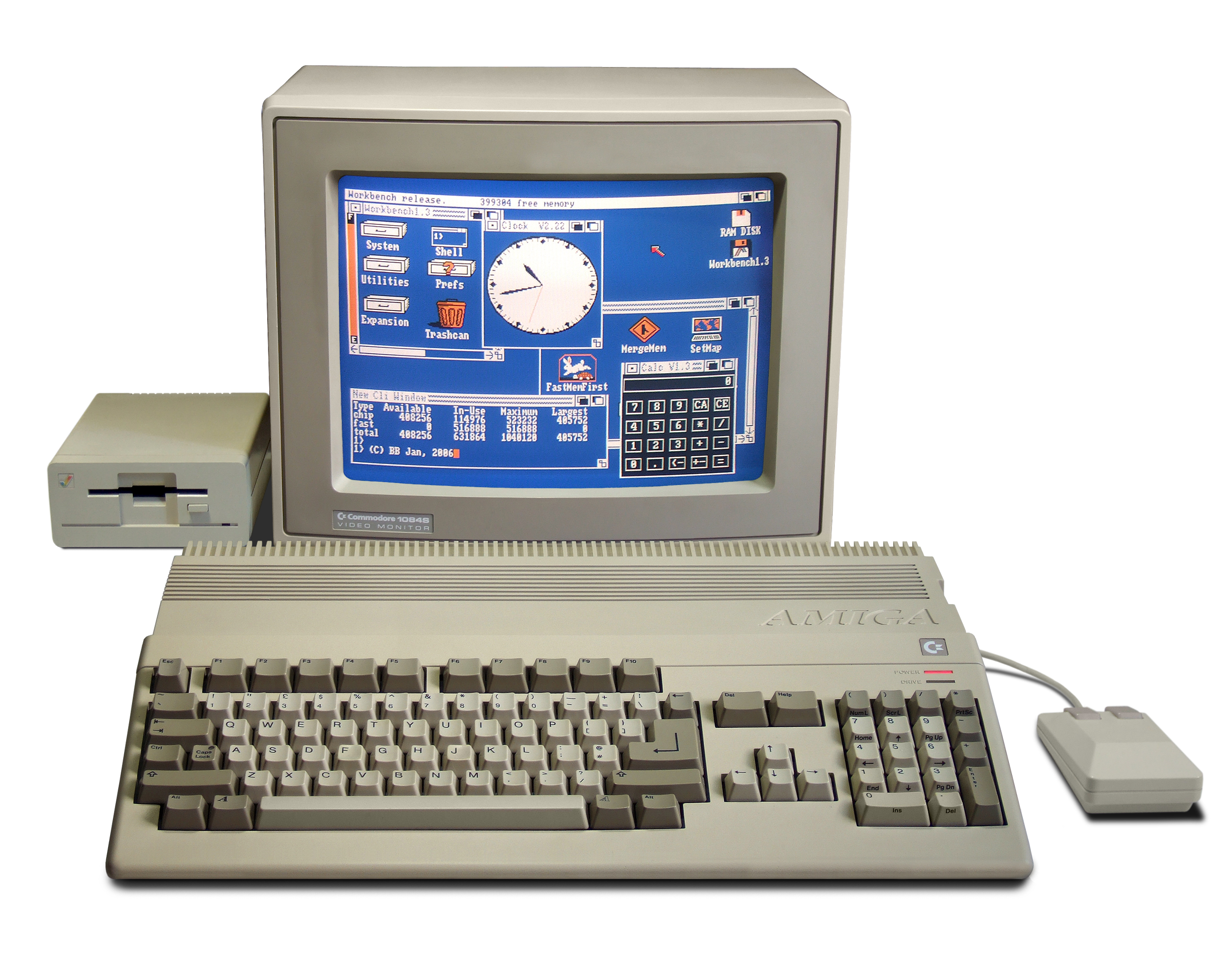
The Amiga 500, the first "low-end" 16 and 32 bit multimedia home/personal computer, was introduced in October 1987.

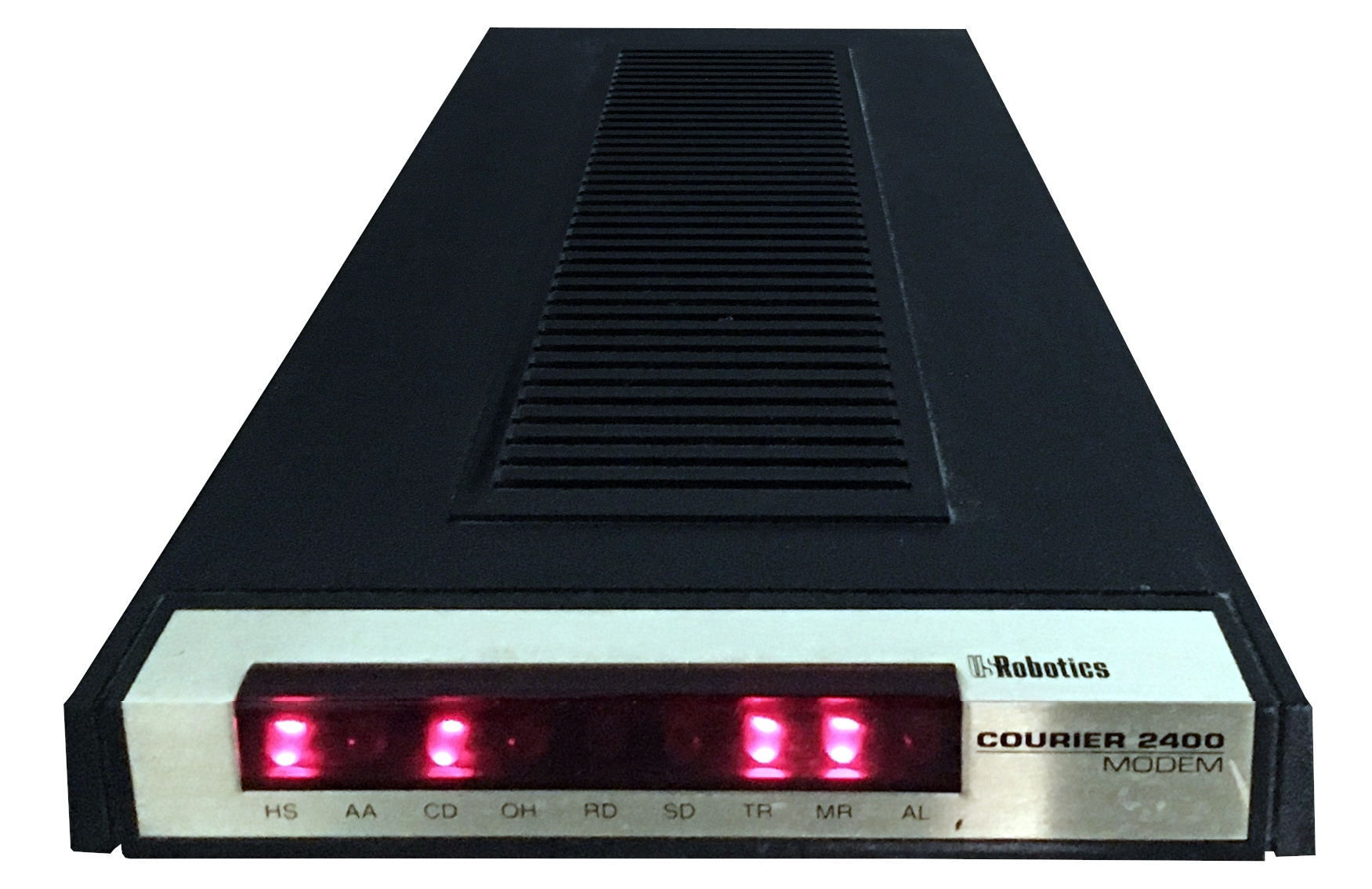
USRobotics Courier 2400 telephone modem

Walkman and boomboxes, invented during the late 1970s, became very popular as they were introduced to various countries in the early 1980s, and had a profound impact on the music industry and youth culture. Consumer VCRs and video rental stores became commonplace as VHS won out over the competing Betamax standard. In addition, in the early 1980s various companies began selling compact, modestly priced synthesizers to the public. This, along with the development of Musical Instrument Digital Interface (MIDI), made it easier to integrate and synchronize synthesizers and other electronic instruments, like drum machines, for use in musical composition.

High definition television (HDTV) of both the analog and digital variety were first developed in the 1980s though their use did not become widespread until the mid-2000s.

In 1981, Hayes Microcomputer Products started selling the Smartmodem. The Smartmodem paved the way for the modern modems that exist today, mainly because it was the first modem to transform what had previously required a two-stage process into a process involving only one stage. The Smartmodem contributed to the rise in popularity of BBS systems in the 1980s and early 1990s, which were the main way to connect to remote computers and perform various social and entertainment activities before the Internet and the World Wide Web finally became popular in the mid-1990s.

The 1980s witnessed a rapid expansion in the communications industry. Almost a decade after Martin Cooper, then an employee of Motorola, made the first mobile phone call in 1973, Millicom Inc., a telecommunications agency, and E.F. Johnson & Co., introduced the first portable cellular phone commercially available for use on a cellular network, the "Lunch Box" in 1981. Two years later, Motorola launched the DynaTAC 8000X or the "Brick," the first commercially available handheld mobile phone weighing 3 pounds (1.4 kg). While revolutionary, these early products were bulky and challenging to handle. This led to fierce competition in the market, with companies vying to produce a lighter, more portable phone, setting the stage for the future of mobile technology.

The race for a slimmer version of the portable cell phone was underway, and technology entrepreneur Jan Stenbeck was determined to lead the charge. Stenbeck founded the tech start-up Technophone with a singular goal in mind: to create a lightweight, pocket-sized mobile phone. In 1986, under the guidance of Technophones chief executive officer, Nils Martensson, the company unveiled the first pocket-sized mobile phone, the Excell PCT105.

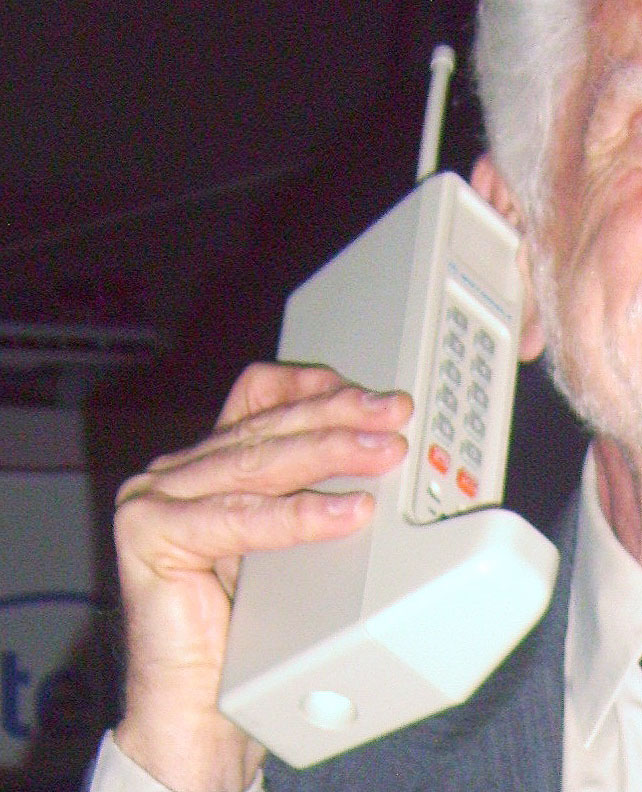
In 1983, the Motorola DynaTAC 8000X becomes the first commercially available mobile phone model

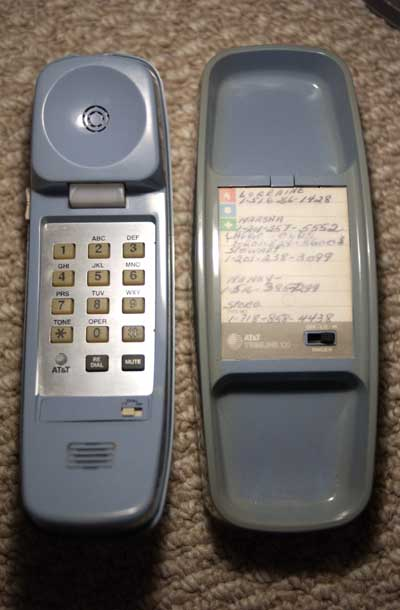
Trimline telephone

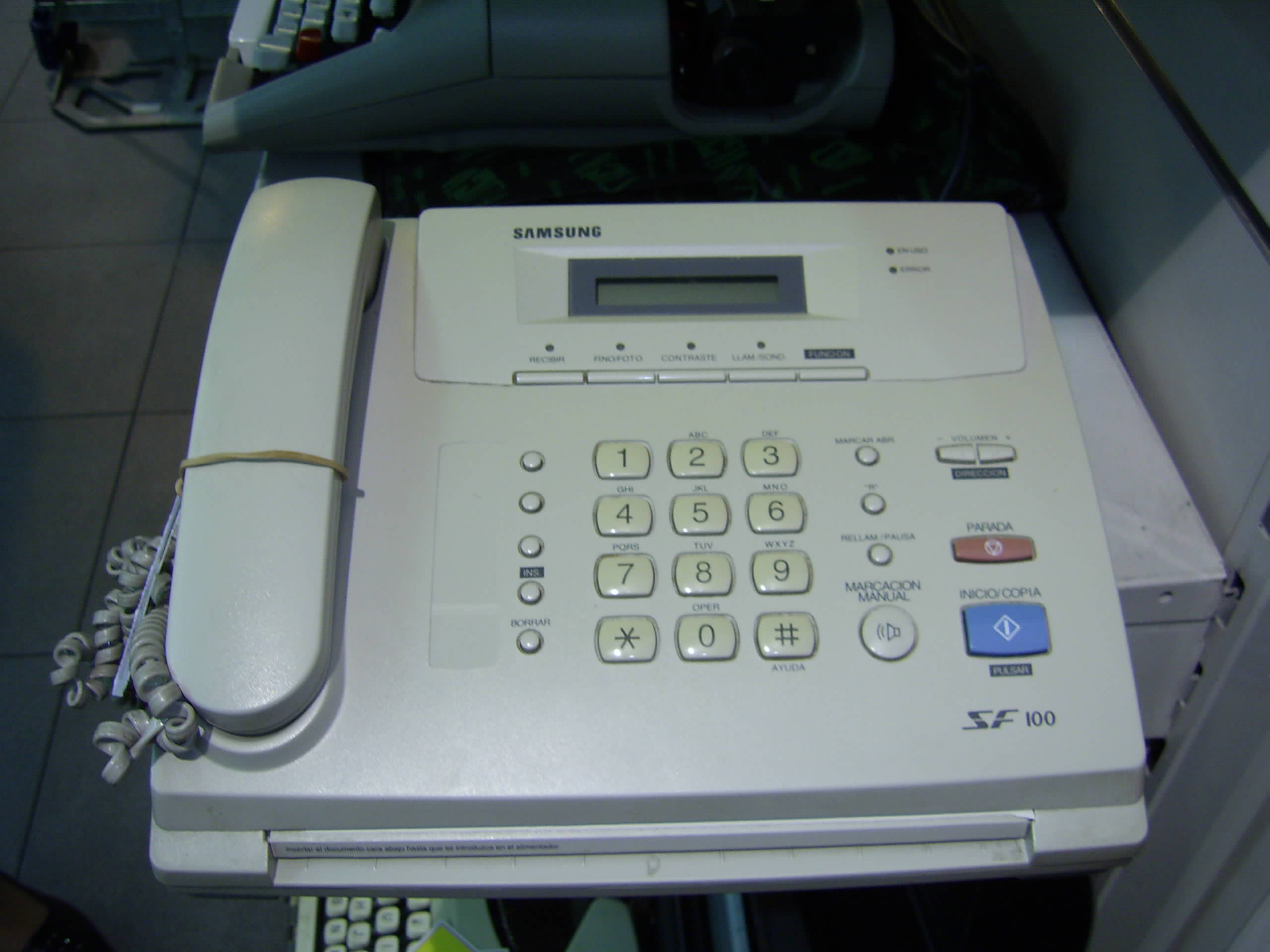
During the decade the standardization of Group 3 facsimile terminals by the International Telecommunication Union contributed to the significant spread of the fax machine.

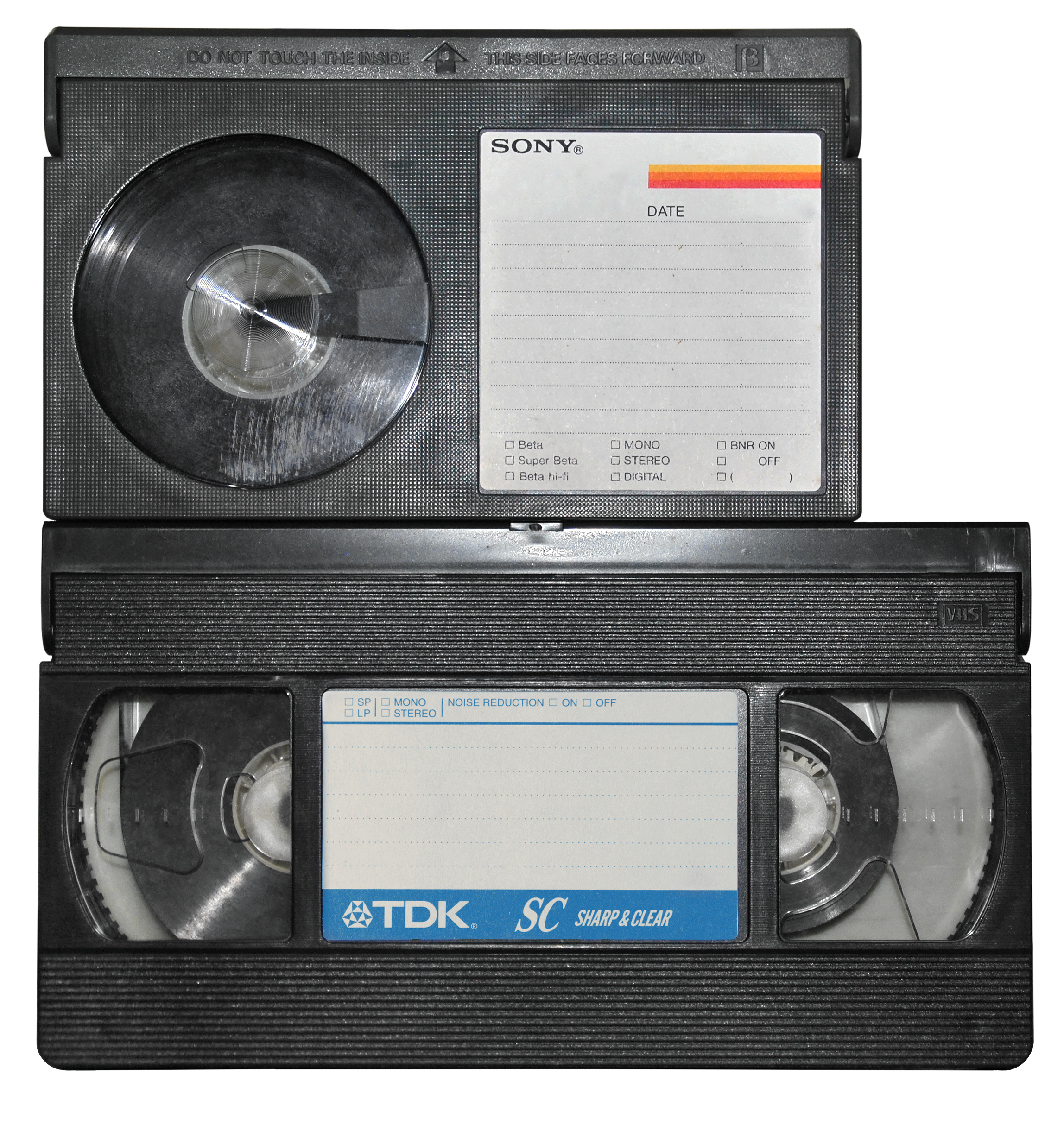
VHS won out over the competing Betamax standard, becoming the leading standard in home video systems

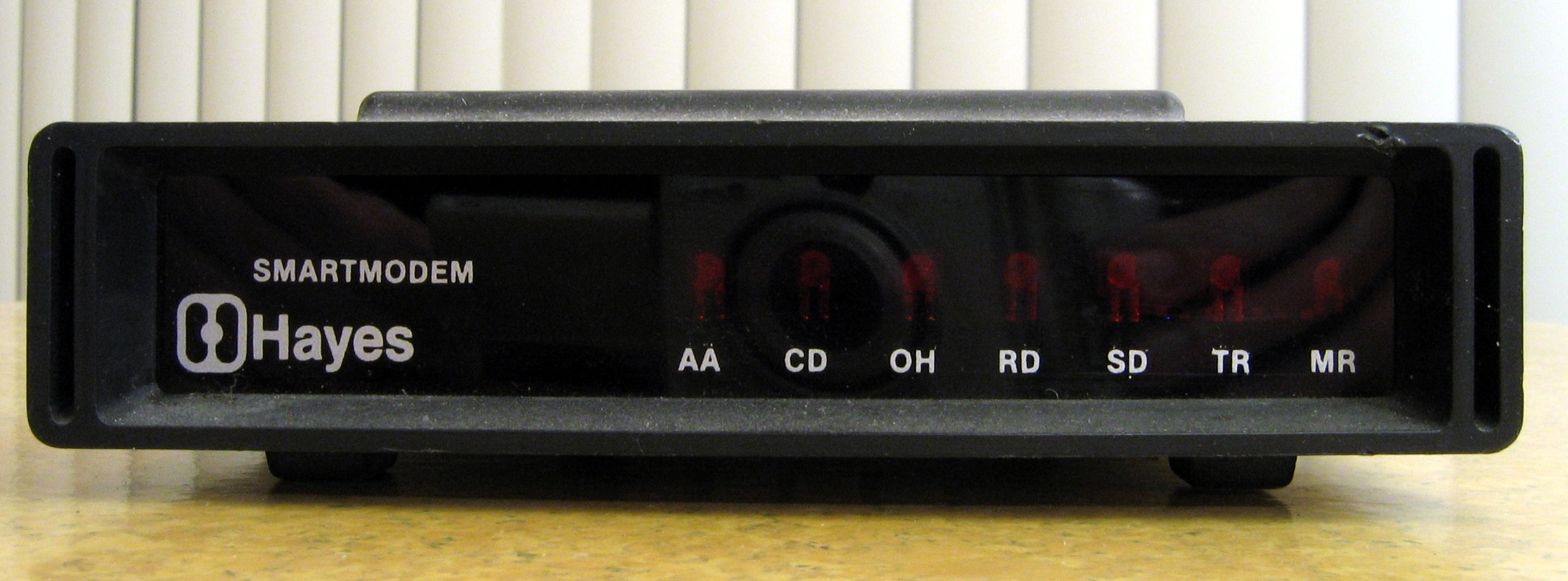
Hayes's Smartmodem

=== Information technology ===
- During the decade Microsoft released the operating systems MS-DOS (1981), Windows 1.0 (1985), and Windows 2.0 (1987).
- Mathematical Software Mathematica, introduced in 1988, by Stephen Wolfram.
- The CD – the most basic CD ("Digital Audio Compact Disc") was released in October 1982 for distribution and listening to digital audio, and at the time contained up to 74 minutes of music.
- TCP/IP: ARPANET officially changed its main protocol from NCP to TCP/IP on 1 January 1983, when the new protocols were activated. The TCP/IP protocol will become the dominant communications protocol from then onwards, and would be used as the foundation on which the Internet would be based.
- The GNU Project (1983). The Free Software Foundation (1985).
- FidoNet – In 1984, FidoNet was launched, enabling BBS users to send private messages (e-mails) and public messages (in the forum) between all BBS systems that were connected to the FidoNet network, in addition to sending files to each other. The rise in popularity and availability of the Internet around the world around the mid-1990s eventually contributed to the irrelevance of FidoNet.
- World Wide Web – In 1989, the British computer scientist Tim Berners-Lee first proposed a project to his employer CERN, based on the concept of hypertext, to facilitate sharing and updating information among researchers. In mid-November 1989 he would develop the first successful communication between a Hypertext Transfer Protocol (HTTP) client and server via the internet. In the coming years Berners-Lee developed the system which would later become the foundation of the World Wide Web.
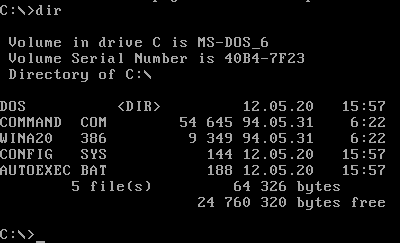
In 1981, Microsoft introduced the MS-DOS operating system, which would become the world's most widely used operating system in the 1980s and first half of the 1990s.

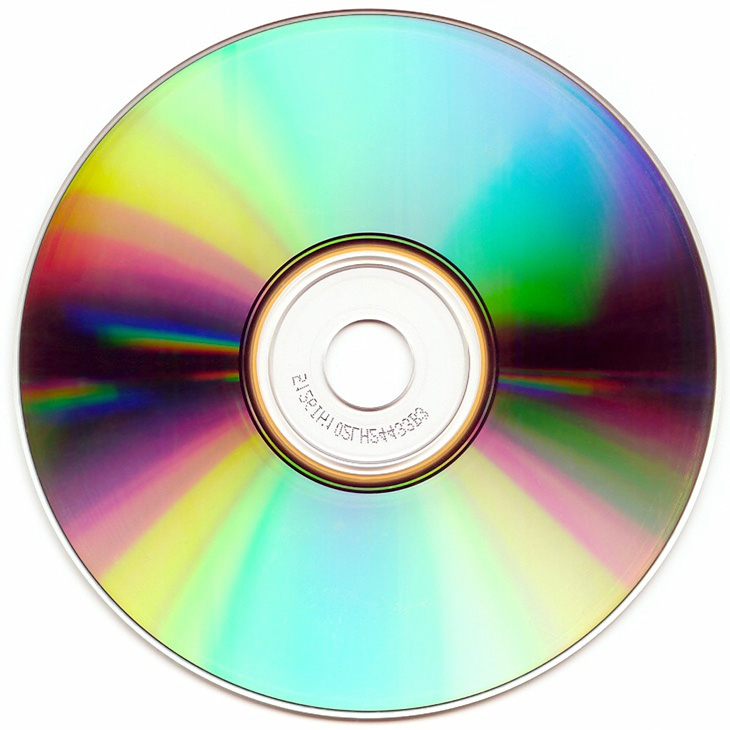
The most basic CD was first introduced in October 1982 for the purpose of distribution and listening to digital audio

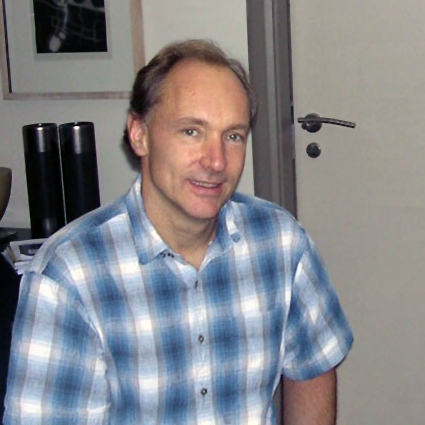
In 1989, the British computer scientist Tim Berners-Lee first proposed the World Wide Web, which he would develop in the coming years

=== Space exploration ===
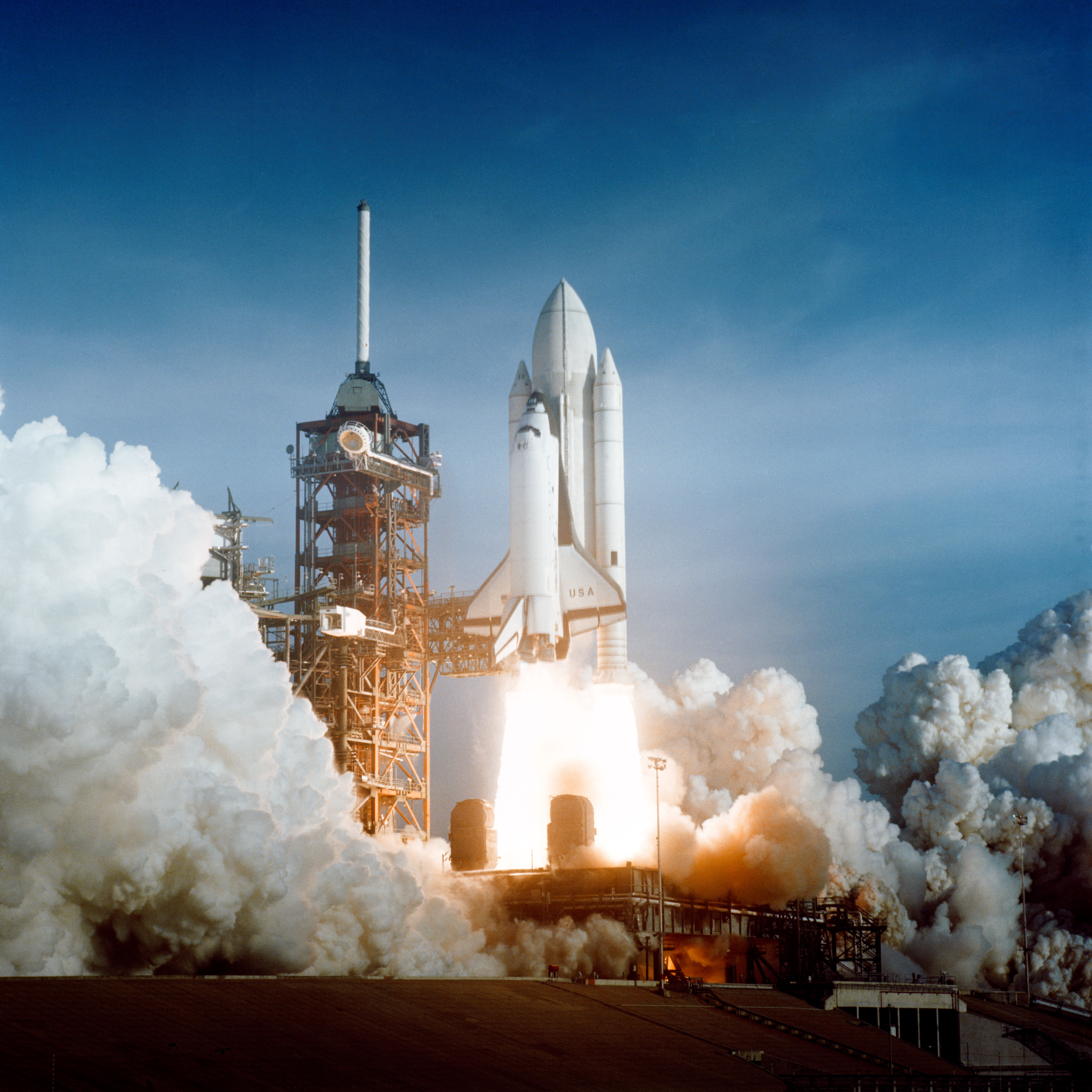
The Space Shuttle Columbia seconds after engine ignition, 1981

American interplanetary probes continued in the 1980s, the Voyager duo being the most known. After making a flyby of Jupiter in 1979, they went near Saturn in 1980–1981. Voyager 2 reached Uranus in 1986 (just a few days before the Challenger disaster), and Neptune in 1989 before the probes exited the Solar System.

No American probes were launched to Mars in the 1980s, and the Viking probes, launched there in 1975, completed their operations by 1982. The Soviets launched two Mars probes in 1988, but they failed.

The arrival of Halley's Comet in 1986 was met by a series of Soviet, Japanese and European Space Agency (ESA) probes, namely Halley Armada.

After a six-year hiatus, American space flights with astronauts resumed with the launch of the Space Shuttle Columbia in April 1981. The shuttle program progressed smoothly from there, with three more orbiters entering service in 1983–1985. But that all came to an end with the tragic loss of the Challenger (STS-51-L) on 28 January 1986, taking with it seven astronauts, including Christa McAuliffe, who was to have been the first teacher in space. In full view of the world, a faulty O-ring on the right solid rocket booster allowed hot gases to burn through the external fuel tank and cause it to explode, destroying the shuttle in the process. Extensive efforts were made to improve NASA's increasingly careless management practices, and to make the shuttle safer. Flights resumed with the launch of Discovery in September 1988.

The Soviet program with cosmonauts went well during the decade, experiencing only minor setbacks. The Salyut 6 space station, launched in 1977, was replaced by Salyut 7 in 1982. Then came Mir in 1986, which ended up operating for more than a decade, and was destined to be the last in the line of Soviet space stations that had begun in 1971. One of the Soviet Union's last "superprojects" was the Buran space shuttle; it was only used once, in 1988.

=== Automobiles ===
The American auto industry began in the 1980s in a thoroughly grim situation, faced with poor quality control, rising import competition, and a severe economic downturn. Chrysler and American Motors (AMC) were near bankruptcy, and Ford was little better off. Only General Motors (GM) continued with business as usual. But the auto makers recovered with the economy by 1983, and in 1985 auto sales in the United States hit a new record. However, the Japanese were now a major presence, and would begin manufacturing cars in the US to get around tariffs. In 1986, Hyundai became the first Korean auto maker to enter the American market. In the same year, the Yugoslavian-built Yugo was brought to the US, but the car was so small and cheap, that it became the subject of jokes. It was sold up to 1991, when economic sanctions against Yugoslavia forced its withdrawal from the American market.

As the decade progressed, cars became smaller and more efficient in design. In 1983, Ford design teams began to incorporate aerodynamic styling to decrease drag while in motion. The Thunderbird was one of the first cars to receive these design changes. In 1985, Ford released the Taurus with a design that was revolutionary among domestic mass market automobiles.

GM began suffering significant losses in the late 1980s, partially the result of chairman Roger Smith's restructuring attempts, and partially because of increasingly dated cars. An example were customers who increasingly purchased European luxury cars rather than Cadillacs. In 1985, GM started Saturn (the first new American make since the Edsel), with the goal of producing high-quality import fighters. Production would not begin until 1990.

Chrysler introduced its new compact, front-wheel drive K-cars in 1981. Under the leadership of Lee Iacocca, the company turned a profit again the following year, and by 1983 paid off its government loans. A succession of models using this automobile platform followed. The most significant were the minivans in 1984. These proved a to be popular and they would dominate the van market for more than a decade. In 1987, Chrysler purchased the Italian makes of Lamborghini and Maserati. In the same year, Chrysler bought AMC from Renault laying to rest the last significant independent US automaker, but acquiring the hugely profitable Jeep line and continuing the Eagle brand until the late 1990s.

The DMC DeLorean was the brainchild of John DeLorean, a flamboyant former GM executive. Production of the gull-winged sports car began in Northern Ireland in 1981. John DeLorean was arrested in October 1982 in a sting operation where he was attempting to sell cocaine to save his struggling company. He was acquitted of all charges in 1984, but too late for the DeLorean Motor Company, which closed down in 1983. The DeLorean gained renewed fame afterward as the time machine in the Back to the Future film trilogy.

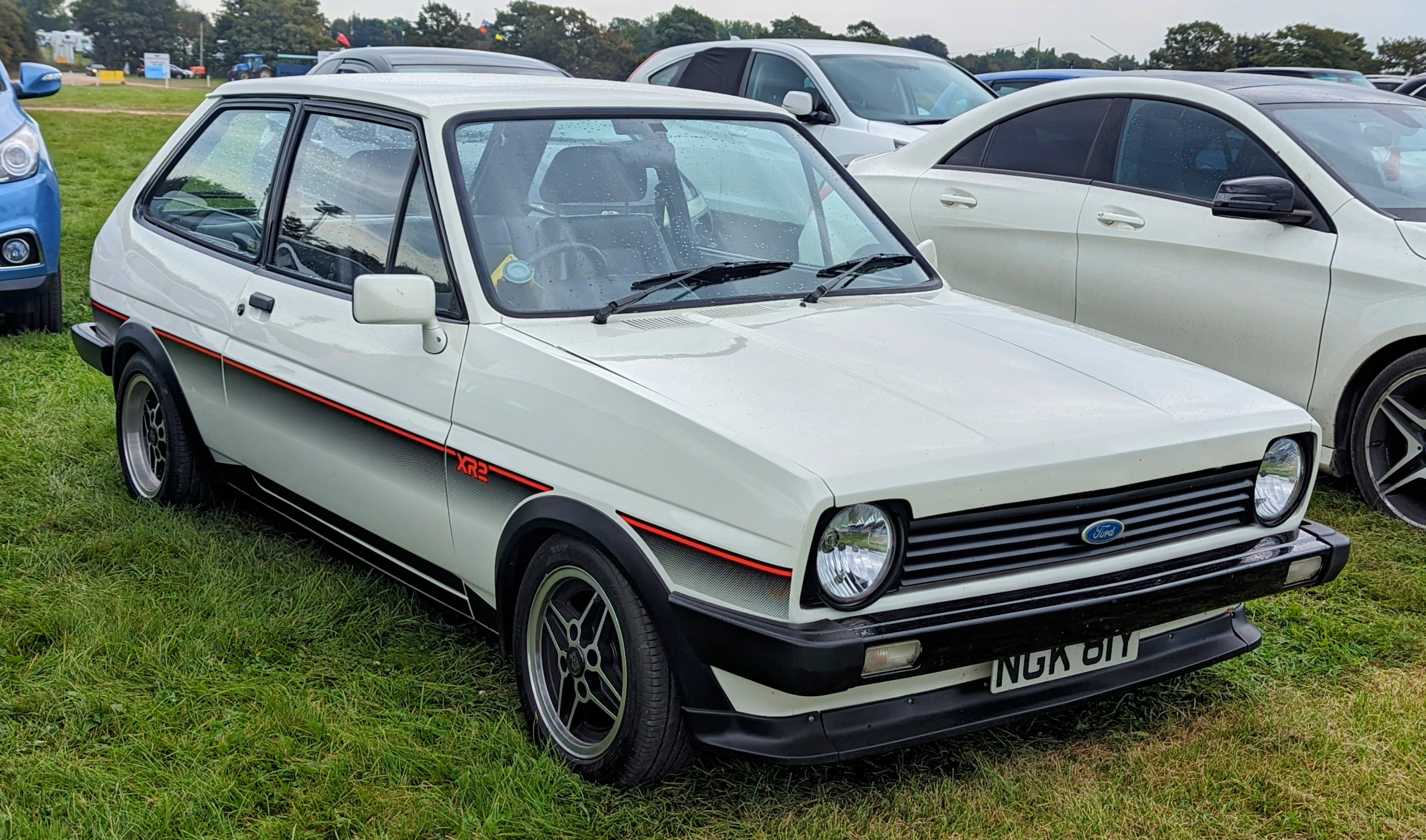
1983 Ford Fiesta XR2. A typical mid-1980s car.

The imposition of corporate average fuel economy (CAFE) fuel-mileage standards in 1979 spelled the end of big-block engines, but performance cars and convertibles reemerged in the 1980s. Turbochargers were widely used to boost the performance of small cars, and technology from fuel injection began to take over from the widely used application of carburetors by the late 1980s. Front-wheel drive also became dominant.

The 1980s marked the decline of European brands in North America by the end of the decade. Renault, Citroën, and Peugeot ceased importation by the end of the decade. Alfa Romeo would continue until 1993. Fiat also ceased imports to North America in the 1980s.

== Economics ==
- The early 1980s was marked by a severe global economic recession that affected much of the developed world.
- Inflation peaked in the US in April 1980 at 14.76% and subsequently fell to a low of 1.10% in December 1986 but then rebounded to 4.65% at the end of the decade.
- Finland's economy grew by almost the fastest pace in the world, which eventually culminated in the recession of the 1990s Finnish economy. In Finland, the 1980s were called the "Nousukausi", or "economic upswing".
- In the late 1980s, Japan experienced an economic bubble, which would culminate in a stock market crash in 1991 that would begin a period of economic stagnation.
- Developing countries reliant on loans from the International Monetary Fund would experience debt crises throughout the 1980s.
- Laissez faire and neoliberal economics have a resurgence in the developed world, led by the UK and US which emphasised reduced government intervention, lower taxes and deregulation of the stock markets, measures that became associated with an economic revival in the mid- to late-1980s.
- Brazil and Mexico suffers from a debt crisis in Latin America starting in 1982 under President João Figueiredo and Miguel de la Madrid. Economic problems worsened between 1979 and 1985 by firing and resignation of most officials of the Brazilian and Mexican government after the Diretas Já movement in 1984, and a failed response of emergency aid in the Mexico City earthquake just after the 175th anniversary of independence holiday in 1985. Tancredo Neves (later succeeded by José Sarney three months later) won a direct presidential election in 1985, marking the end of a 21-year military dictatorship, while Mexico's Carlos Salinas de Gortari won a controversial presidential election in 1988 amid charges of voter fraud, bribery, corruption and other abuses of power.
- Enactment of the Canada–United States Free Trade Agreement in 1989 to further establish a strong economic bond between the two prosperous neighbor countries of North America.
- In the Soviet Union, the eleventh Five-Year Plan was initiated in 1981 during a period of economic stagnation that began in the late 1970s. The Plan was a near failure, as most of the targets were not met. With the ascent of Mikhail Gorbachev as General Secretary of the Communist Party, the twelfth Five-Year Plan sought to accelerate and restructure the Soviet economy through reforms to decentralize production and distribution systems.
- Under the leadership of Deng Xiaoping, China embarked on the reform and opening up in the 1980s, opening the country's economy to the West and allowing capitalist enterprises to operate in a market socialist system. The corruption of Communist Party leadership was met by dissent from students and workers in the Tiananmen Square protests of 1989 which were suppressed by the People's Liberation Army.
- The Solidarity movement began in Poland in 1980, involving workers demanding political liberalization and democracy in Poland. Attempts by the Communist government to prevent the rise of the Solidarity movement failed and negotiations between the movement and the government took place. Solidarity would be instrumental in encouraging people in other communist states to demand political reform.
- The financial world and the stock market were glamorized in a way they had not been since the 1920s, and figures like Donald Trump and Michael Milken were widely seen as symbols of the decade. Widespread fear of Japanese economic strength would grip the United States in the 1980s.
- The "Black Monday" stock market crash on 19 October 1987, decreased the value of the Dow Jones Industrial Average by more than 22%, causing widespread secondary drops in world markets.
- During the 1980s, for the first time in world history, transpacific trade (with East Asia, such as China, and Latin America, primarily with Mexico) equaled that of transatlantic trade (with Western Europe or with neighboring Canada), solidifying American economic power.
- The Savings and Loan crisis and Keating five scandal.
- The phrase Big Bang, used in reference to the sudden deregulation of financial markets, was coined to describe measures, including abolition of fixed commission charges and of the distinction between stockjobbers and stockbrokers on the London Stock Exchange and change from open-outcry to electronic, screen-based trading, effected by Margaret Thatcher in 1986.

== Popular culture ==
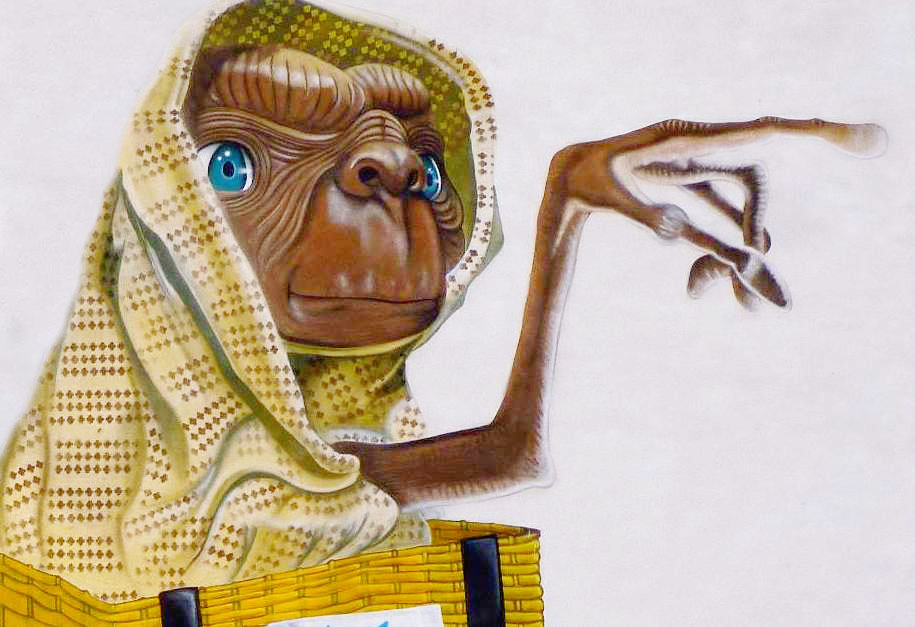
Popular films of the decade included E.T. the Extra-Terrestrial, The Empire Strikes Back, Raiders of the Lost Ark, The Shining, Ghostbusters, Top Gun, Back to the Future, Raging Bull, Aliens, Batman, Beverly Hills Cop, The Terminator, Die Hard, Platoon, Rain Man, Scarface, Return of the Jedi, and The Breakfast Club, many of which became critical and commercial landmarks of the decade.

TV shows like Full House, Cheers, The Golden Girls, Dallas, Dynasty, The Cosby Show, Miami Vice, The A-Team, Knots Landing, Murder, She Wrote, Family Ties, St. Elsewhere, Growing Pains, Magnum, P.I., ALF, MacGyver, Hill Street Blues, Knight Rider, The Love Boat, Falcon Crest, Diff'rent Strokes, and Taxi, were popular in the 1980s.

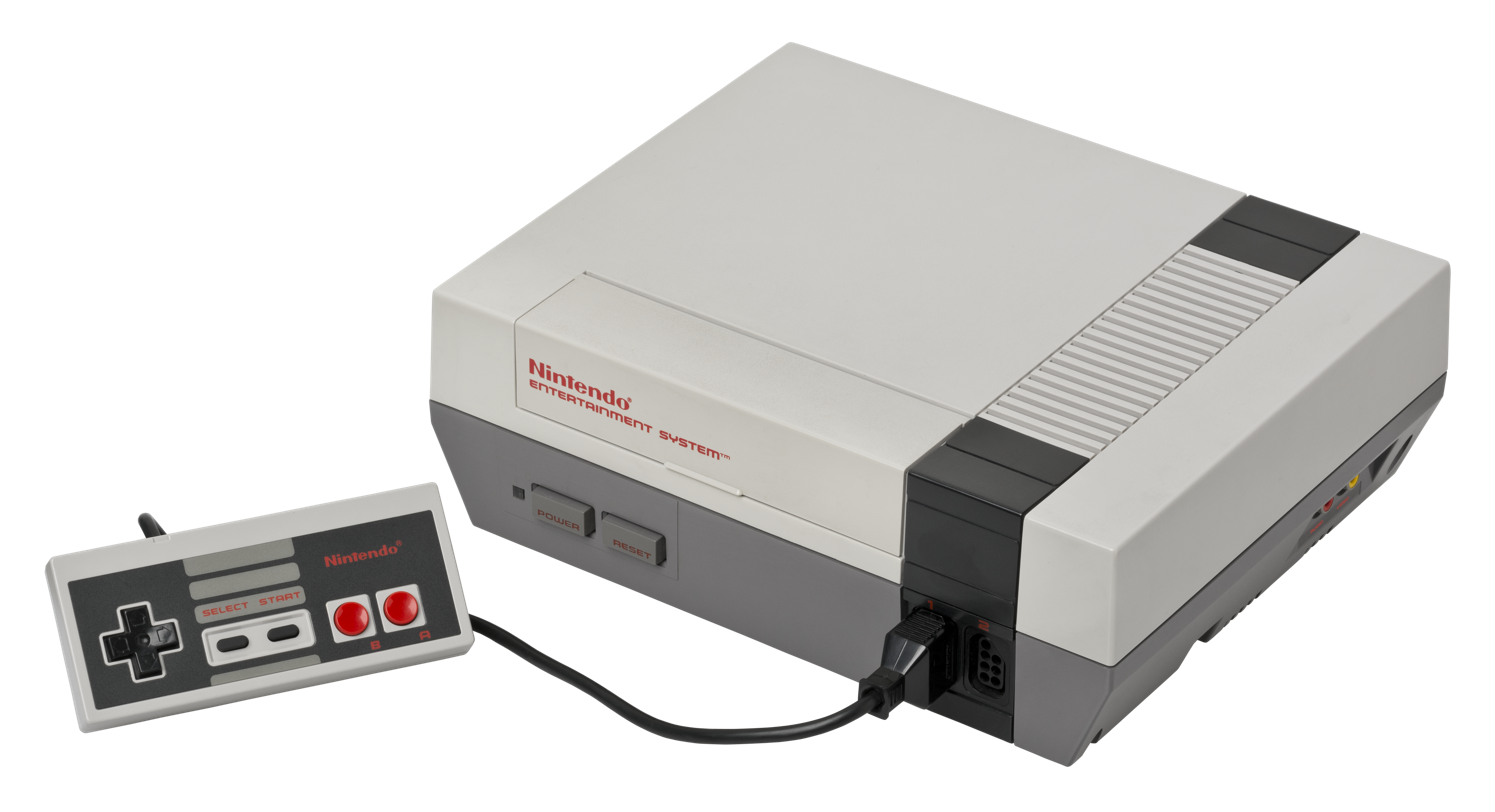
The video game crash of 1983 severely impacted the home console market. The industry rebounded with the success of the Nintendo Entertainment System, led by games such as Super Mario Bros., The Legend of Zelda, Metroid, Contra, Mike Tyson's Punch-Out!!, and Final Fantasy.

MTV defined a generation in the 1980s, reshaping music and youth culture through nonstop music video rotation. This growth was part of a wider expansion of cable television, which introduced channels such as HBO, CNN, ESPN, and Nickelodeon, transforming entertainment, news, and sports broadcasting.

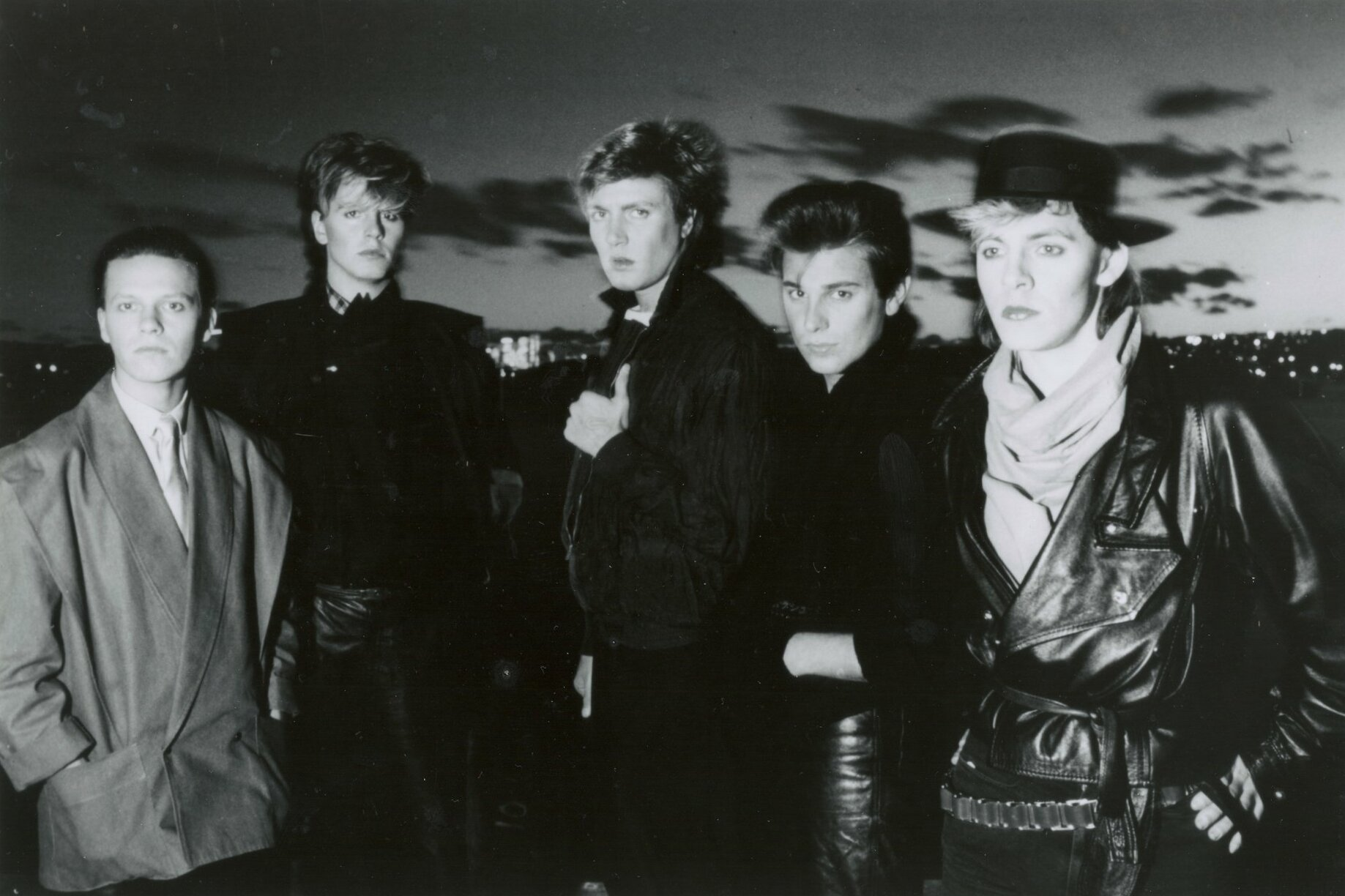
New wave music became one of the defining musical movements of the decade, blending punk rock, pop, and electronic music. Artists such as Duran Duran, The Police, The Cars, Tears for Fears, Depeche Mode, A-ha, Culture Club, Eurythmics, and The Cure rose to huge international prominence with heavy rotation on MTV.

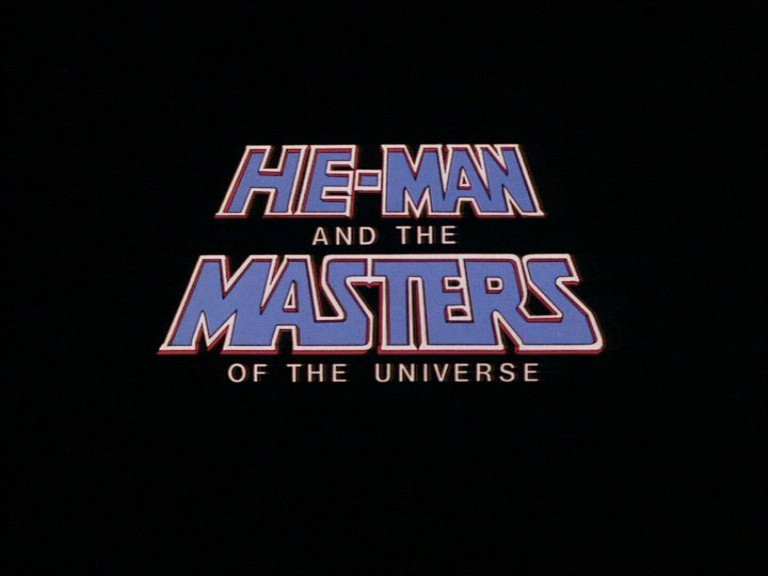
He-Man and the Masters of the Universe, Teenage Mutant Ninja Turtles, The Transformers, The Smurfs, Alvin and the Chipmunks, Garfield and Friends, Inspector Gadget, ThunderCats, DuckTales, Chip 'n Dale: Rescue Rangers, and Muppet Babies were popular cartoons in the 1980s.

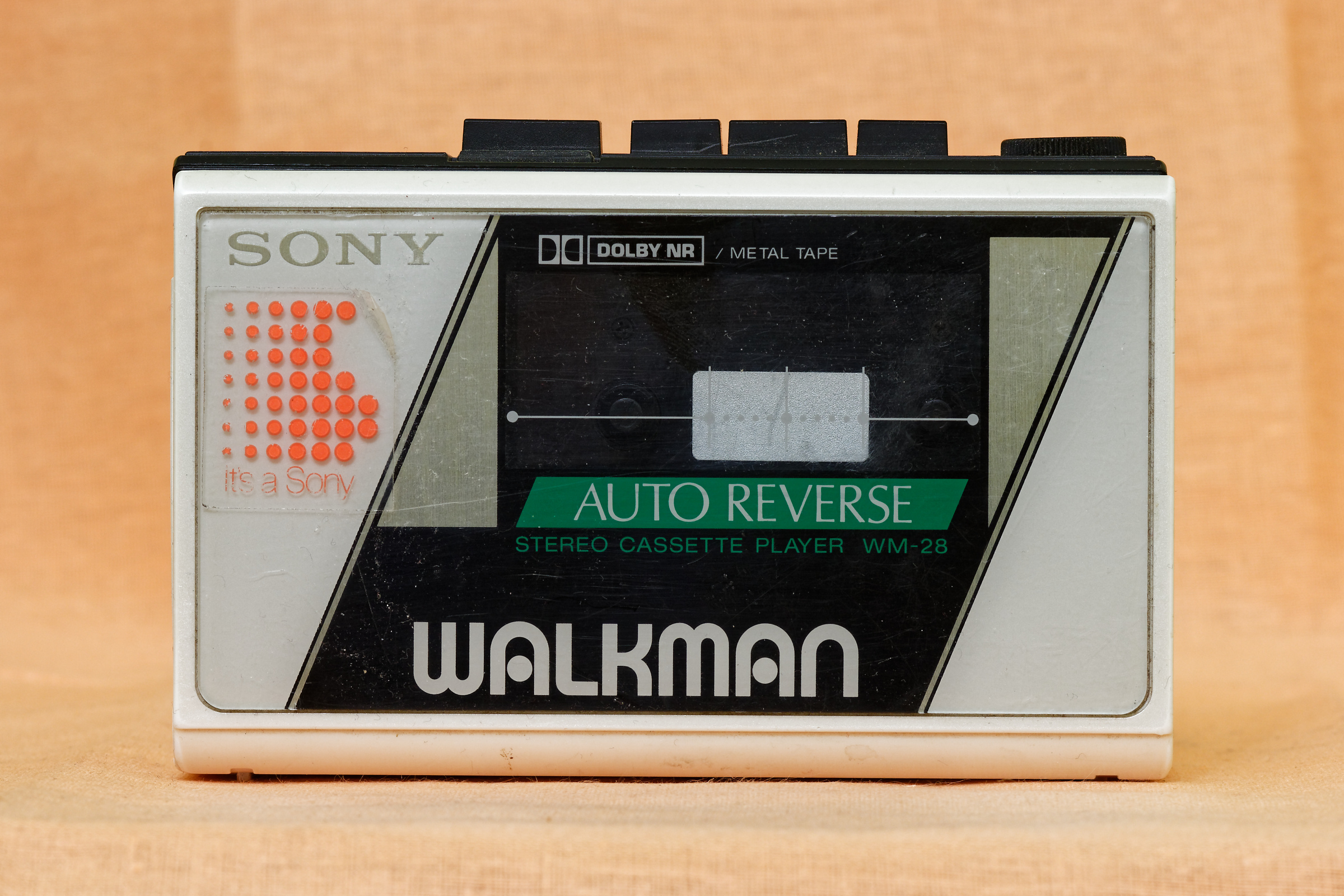
Portable technology advanced with devices such as the Sony Walkman, Game Boy, and Polaroid instant cameras, which became defining consumer products of the 1980s.

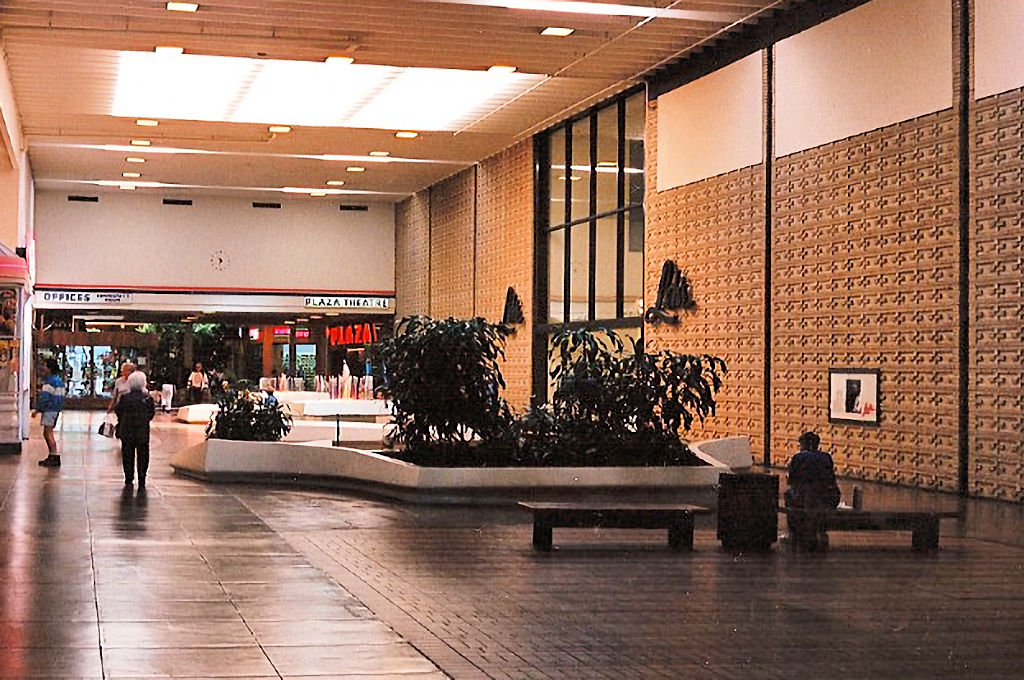
Shopping malls became central to suburban life and youth culture in the 1980s, reflecting the decade's rise in consumerism, with major retailers and food courts serving as popular social hubs.

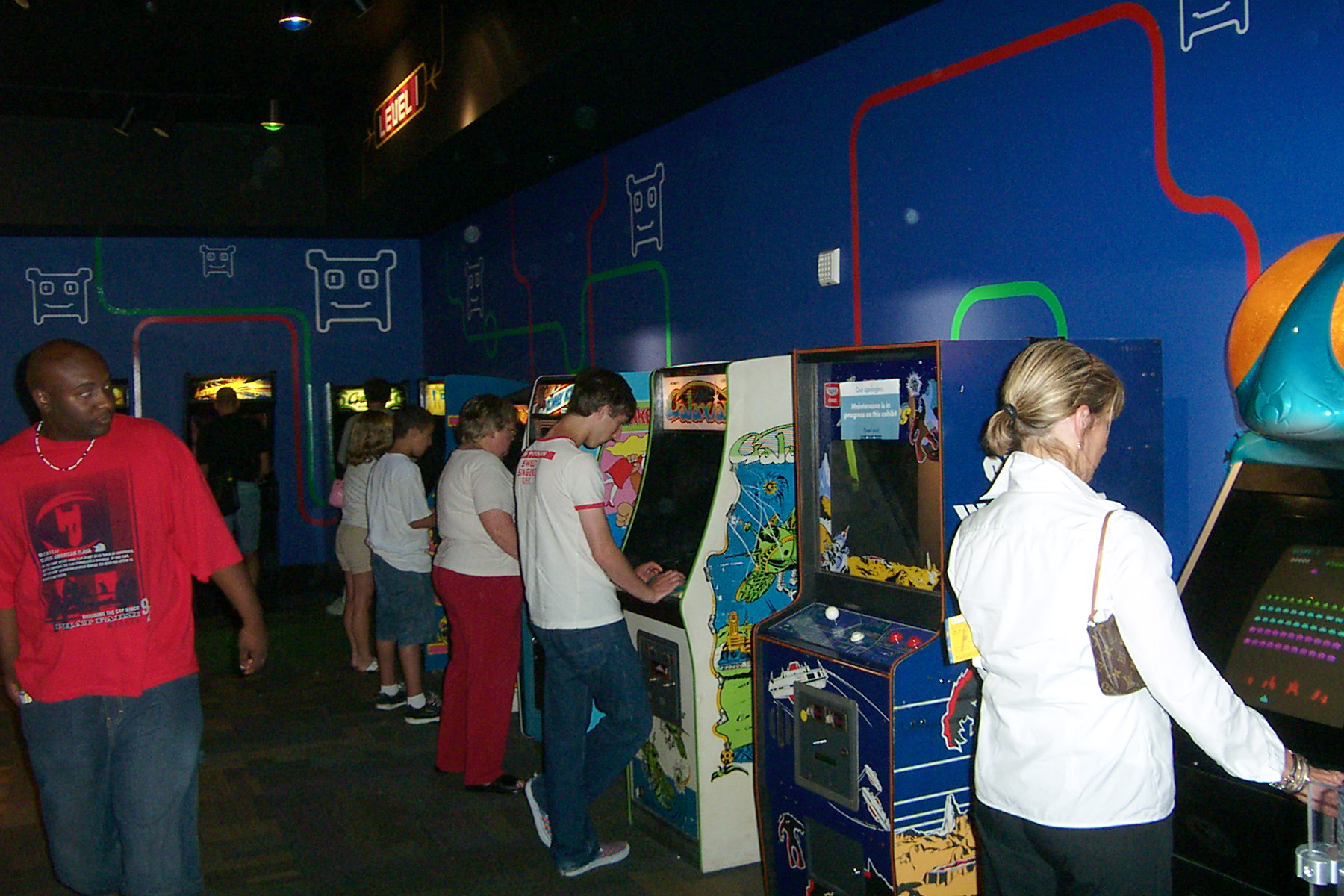
Arcade games like Pac-Man, Donkey Kong, Frogger, Defender, Galaga, Centipede, and Joust, were popular during the golden age of arcade video games.

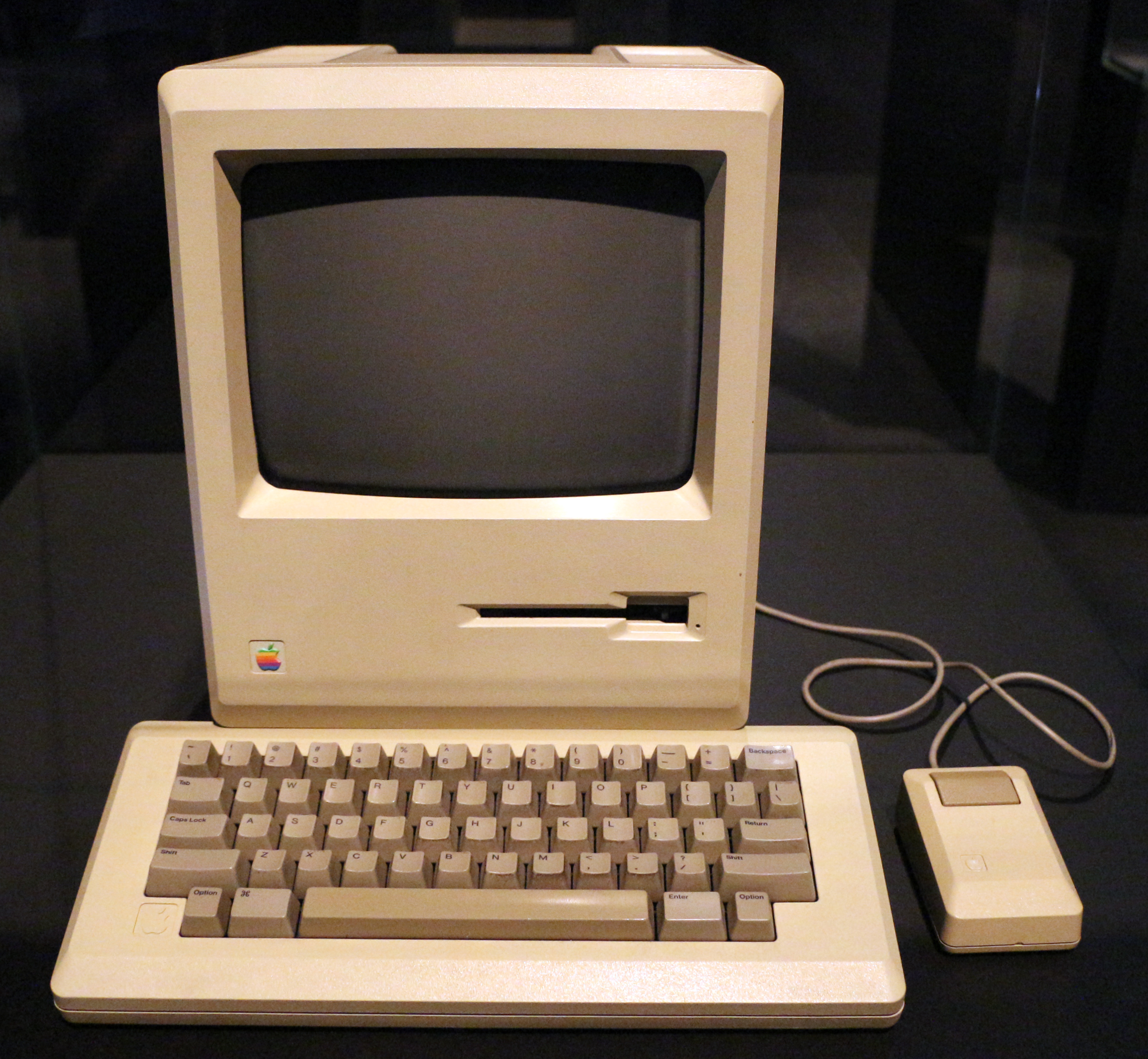
Personal computers entered homes and schools with systems such as the Apple Macintosh, IBM Personal Computer, and Commodore 64, helping popularize home computing.

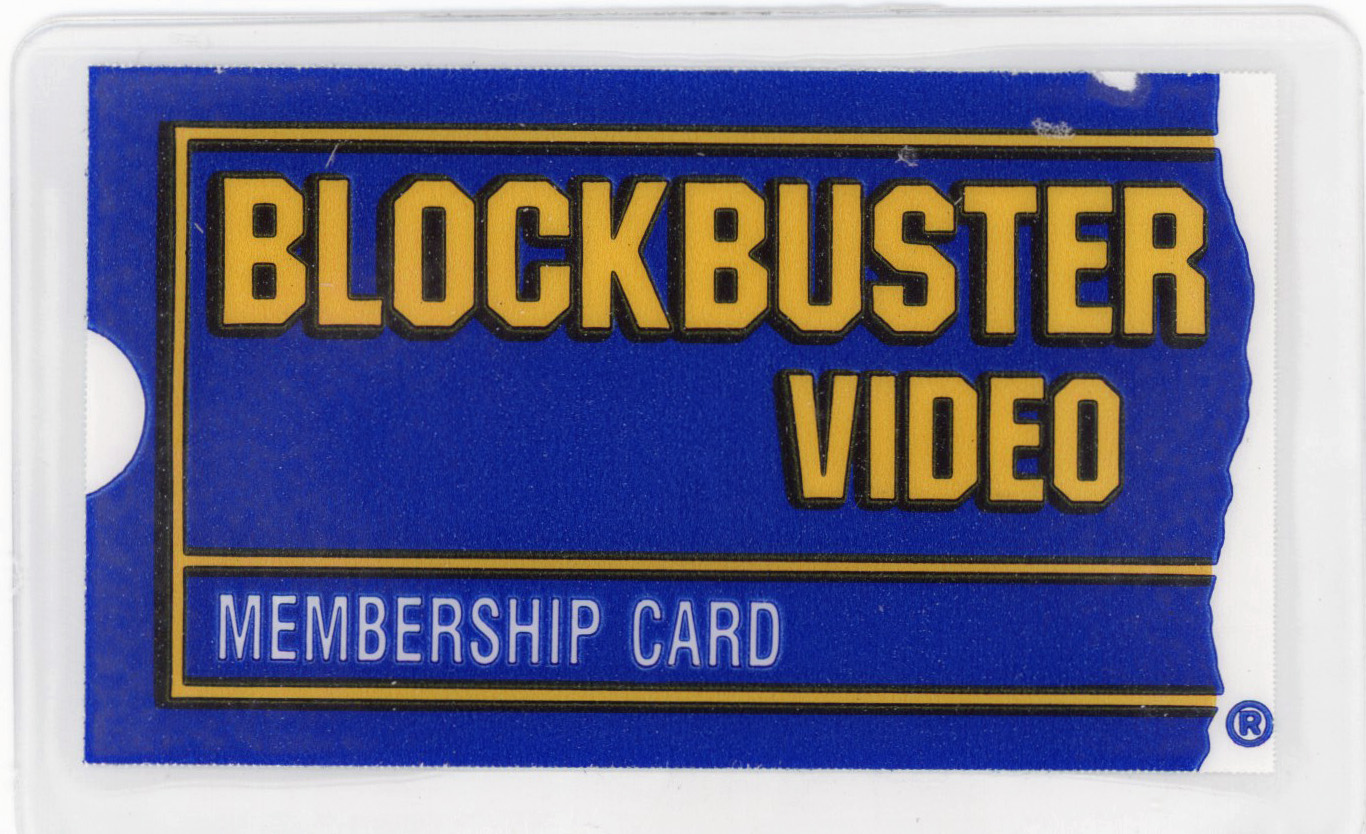
The decade saw the rise of home video, particularly through the VHS format. It allowed audiences to watch films at home, with rental chains like Blockbuster and Hollywood Video becoming widespread.

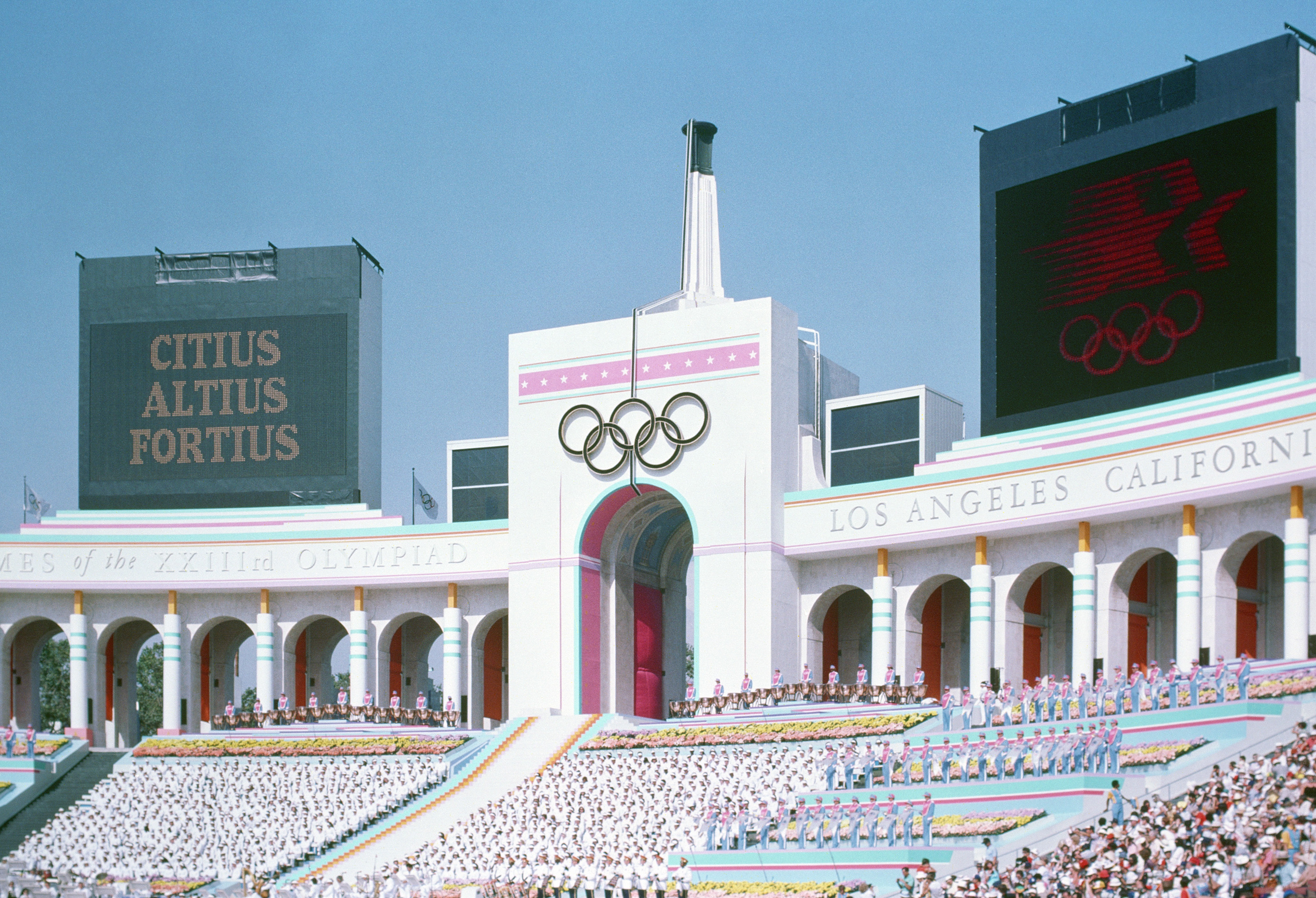
Six Olympic Games were held in the 1980s, Lake Placid and Moscow in 1980, Sarajevo and Los Angeles in 1984, Calgary and Seoul in 1988.

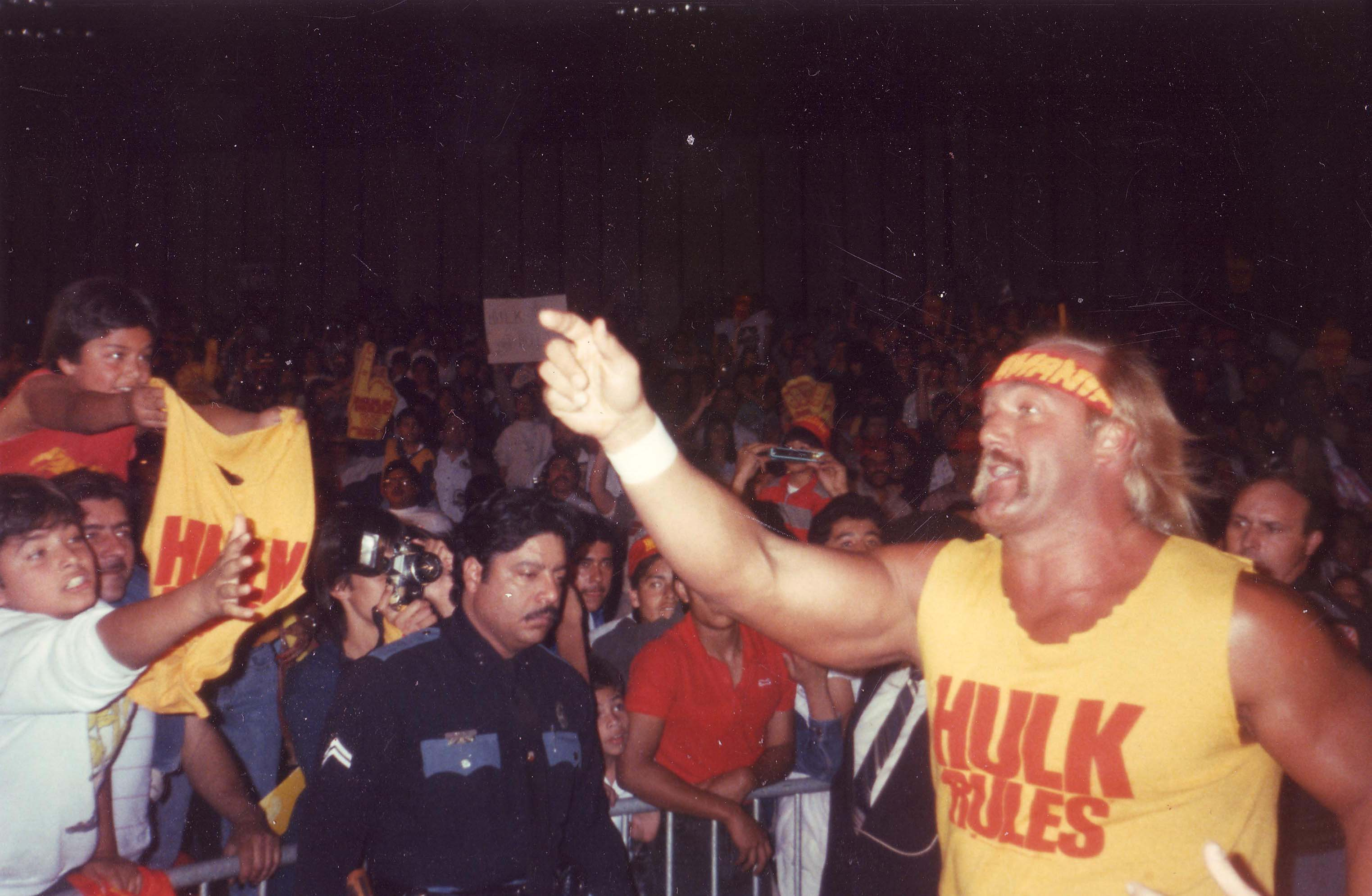
The 1980s professional wrestling boom brought the World Wrestling Federation into mainstream pop culture, with stars such as Hulk Hogan, André the Giant, Randy Savage, Ultimate Warrior, and Ric Flair headlining major events like WrestleMania.

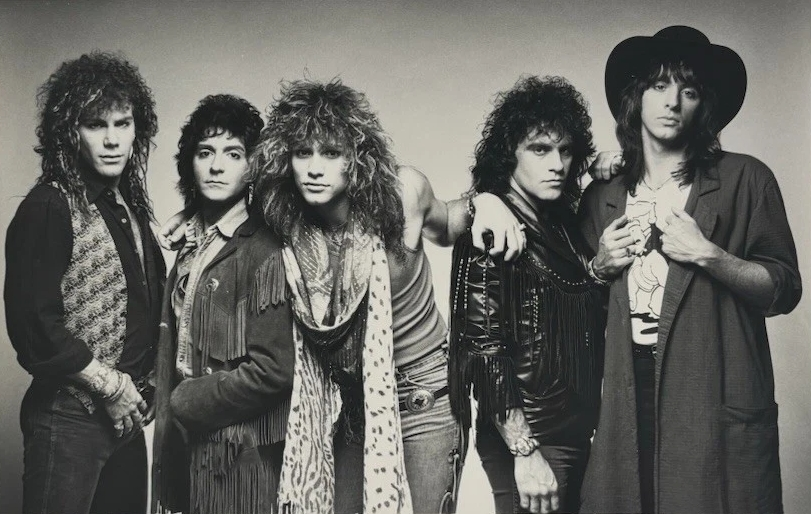
The decade saw the rise of glam metal, a style of hard rock that was characterized by flashy fashion and anthemic songs. Bands such as Bon Jovi, Mötley Crüe, Def Leppard, and Twisted Sister helped define the genre and its mainstream popularity on MTV.

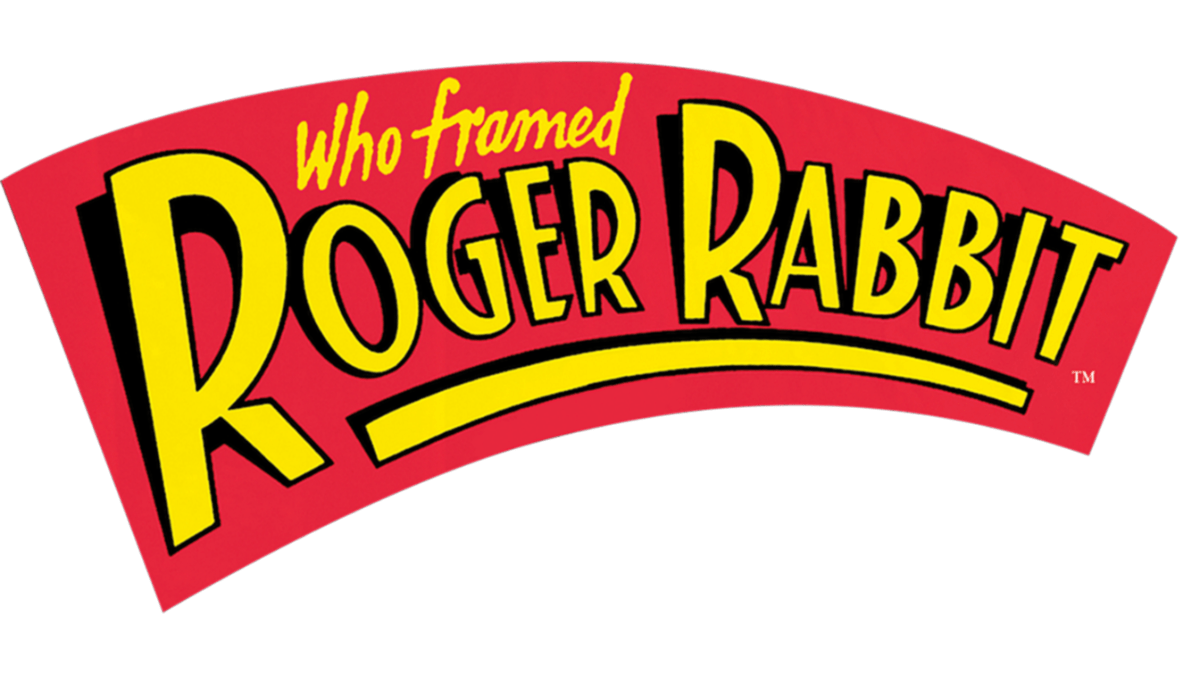
After a turbulent decline in the 1960s and 1970s, animation began to thrive again due to the success of films such as The Great Mouse Detective, An American Tail, Who Framed Roger Rabbit, Oliver & Company, The Land Before Time, and The Little Mermaid.

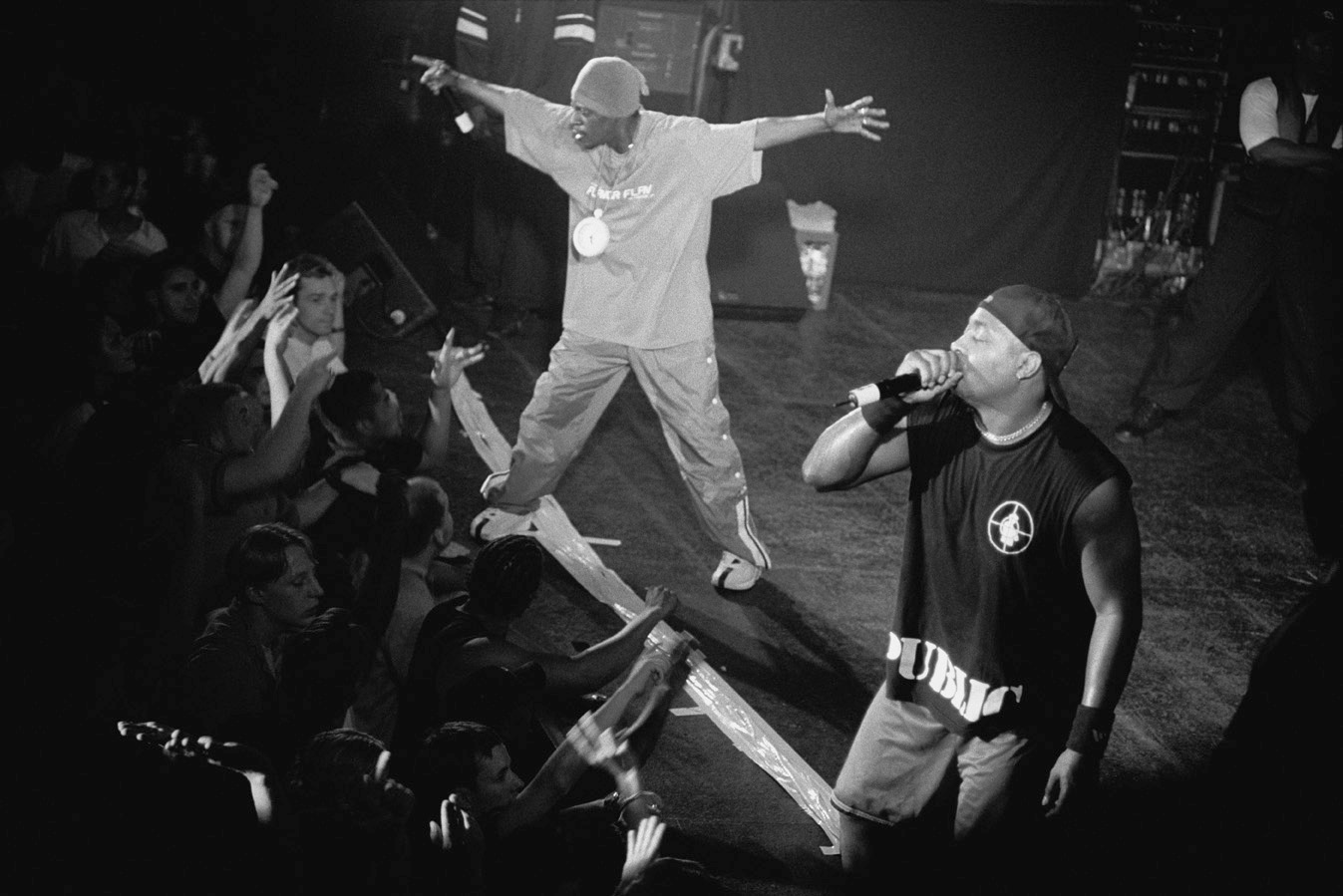
Hip-hop entered the mainstream through artists such as Public Enemy, LL Cool J, Beastie Boys, Run-DMC, Salt-N-Pepa, and N.W.A, while television programs like Yo! MTV Raps helped popularize rap music worldwide.

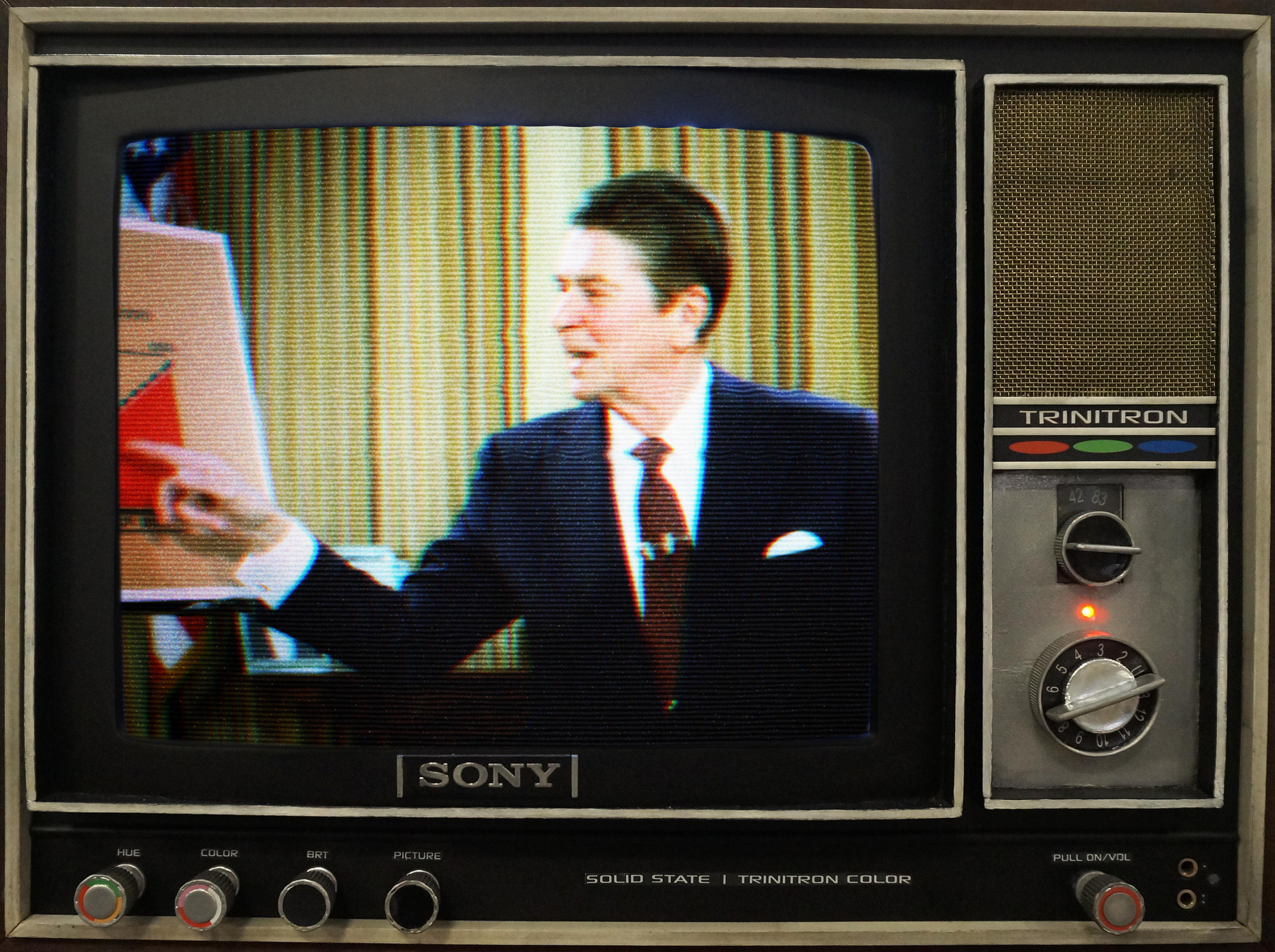
Ronald Reagan was president of the United States for a majority of the 1980s (1981–1989), during what was called the Reagan era. Ronald Reagan's vice president George H. W. Bush became president in 1989.

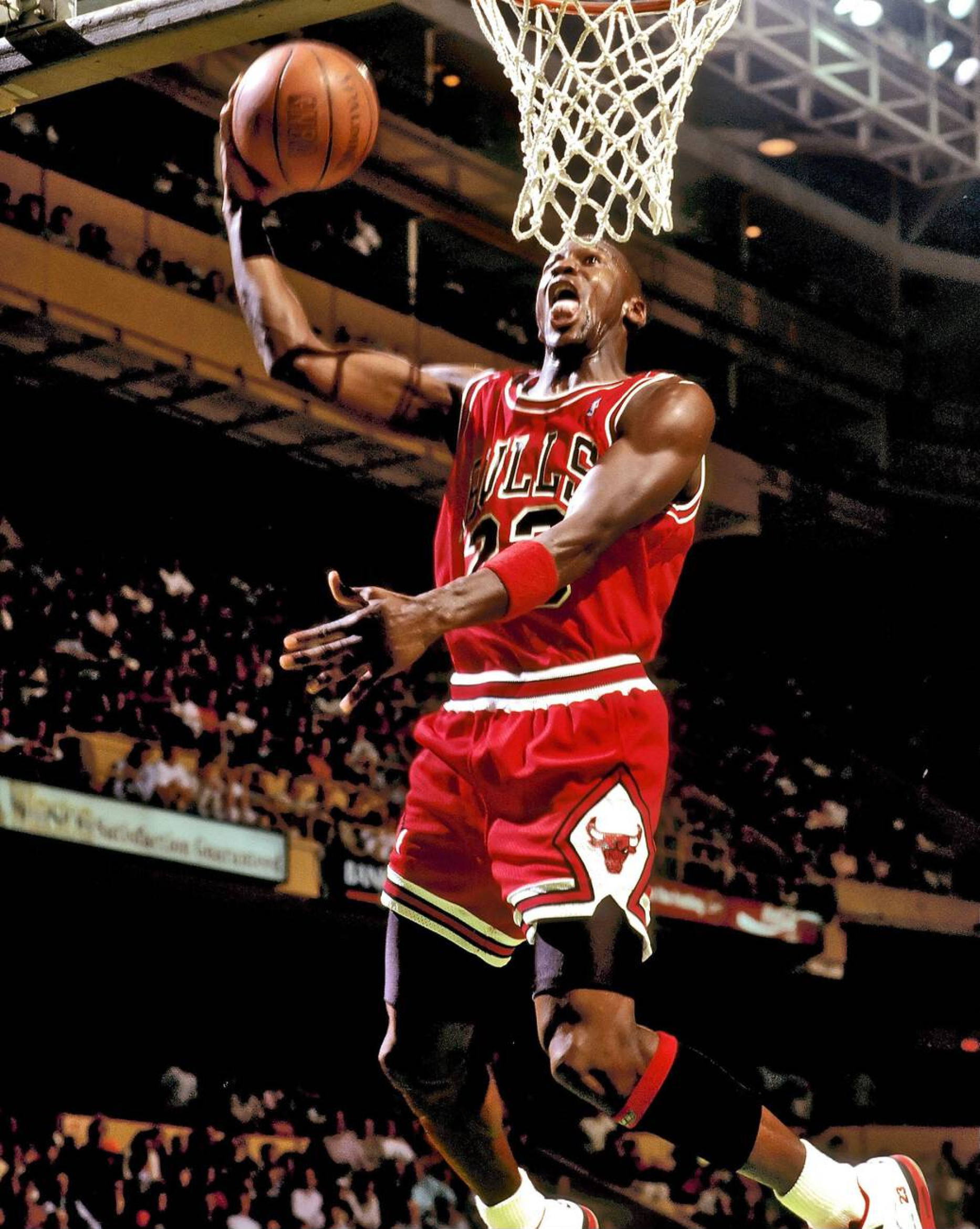
The rise of the National Basketball Association in the 1980s turned players like Michael Jordan, Magic Johnson, Larry Bird, and Kareem Abdul-Jabbar into global icons, helping popularize basketball worldwide.

=== Music ===
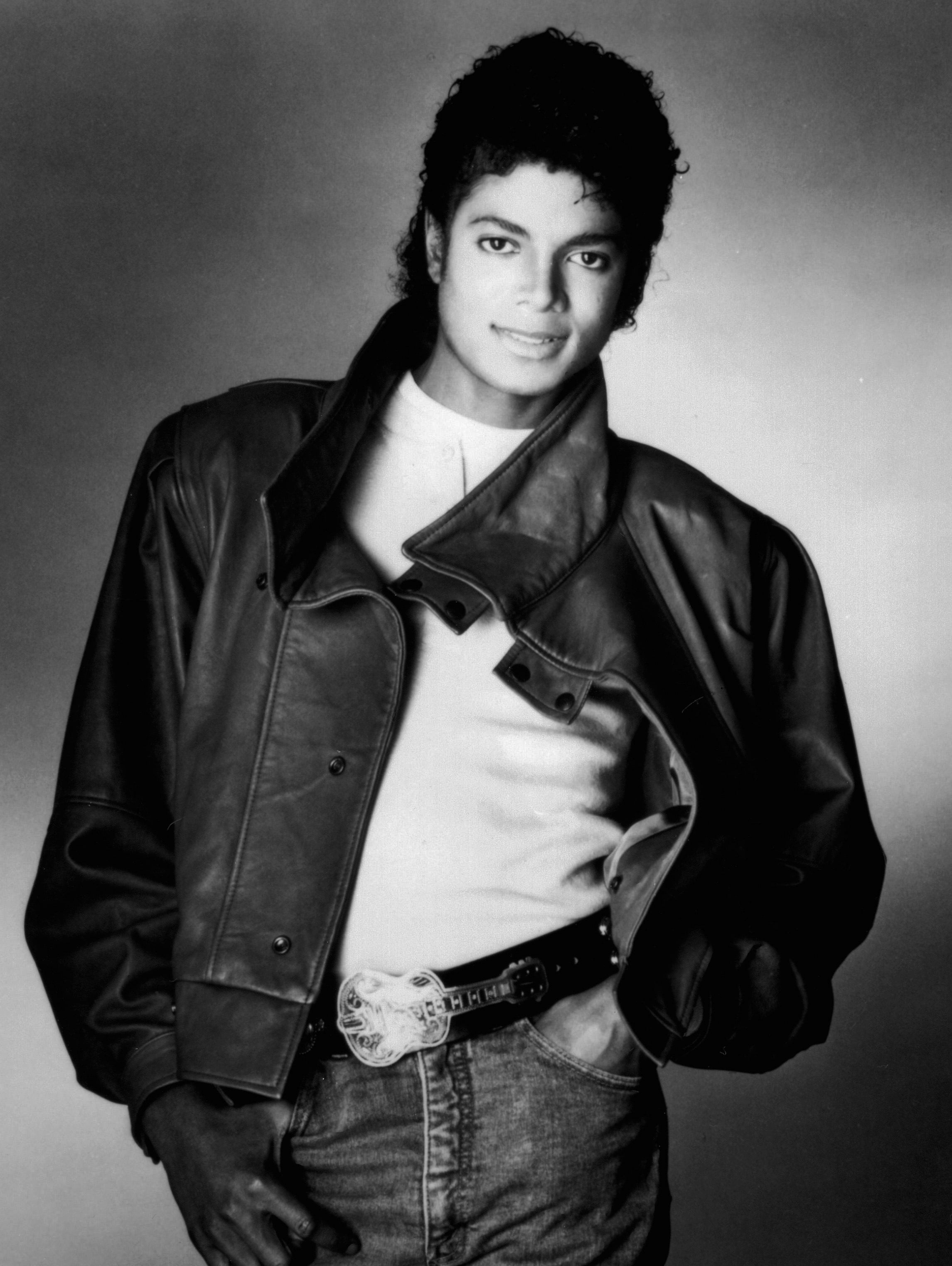
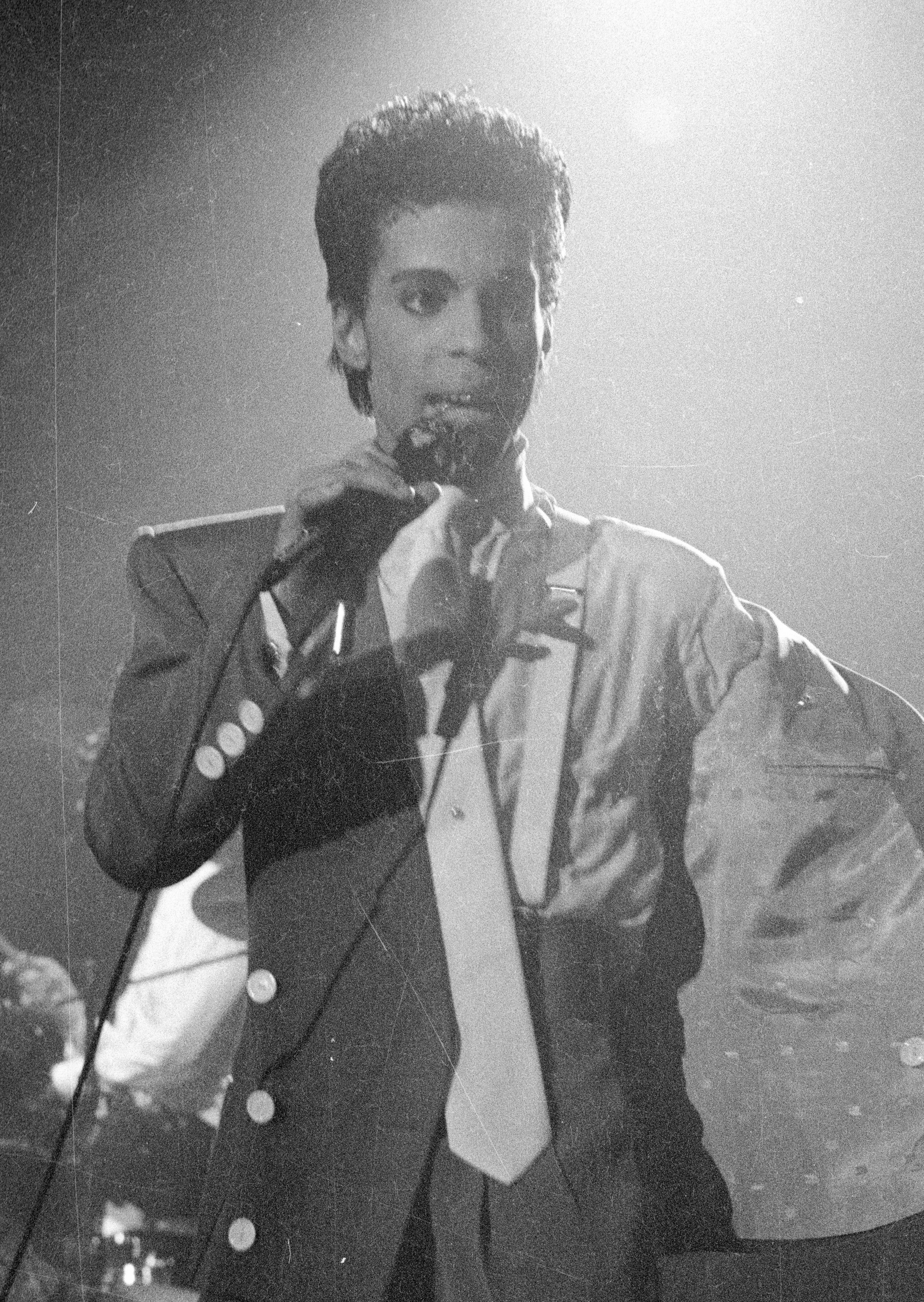
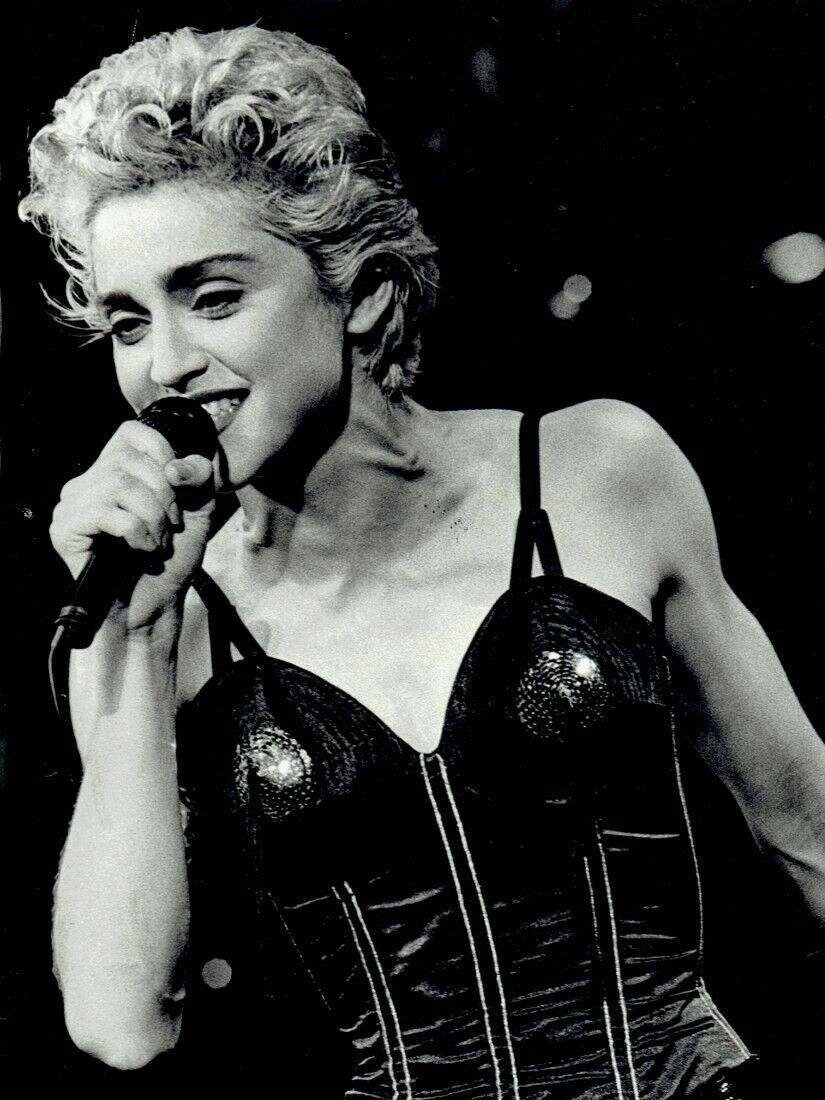
Michael Jackson, Prince, and Madonna were among the best-selling musical talents of the decade, all considered some of the most globally popular and culturally significant pop and R&B talents of the 1980s, pictured here in 1983, 1986 and 1987 respectively.

In the United States, MTV was launched and music videos began to have a larger effect on the record industry. Pop artists/bands such as Duran Duran, Michael Jackson, George Michael, Whitney Houston, Prince, Cyndi Lauper and Madonna mastered the format and helped turn this new product into a profitable business. At the beginning of the decade new wave fell from favor with the rise of the New Romantic, new pop and synthpop genres developed by many British and American artists, popular phenomena throughout the decade especially in the early and mid-1980s. Music evolved into fragmented and combined subgenres, including house, goth, and rap metal. Famous music videos include those of Peter Gabriel.

The advent of numerous new technologies had a significant impact on 1980s music, and led to a distinct production aesthetic that included synthesizer sounds, drum machines and drum reverb.

Duran Duran, the biggest band of the 1980s, were leaders in the Second British Invasion, with a level of fame similar to Beatlemania by 1985. Their debut single was "Planet Earth" (1981). Their breakthrough album was Rio (1982). The single "Hungry Like the Wolf" was number 1 in Canada. UK number 1 singles include "Is There Something I Should Know?" and "The Reflex", which was the band's most successful single and was also number 1 in the US and on the Eurochart Hot 100. "A View to a Kill", theme song of the James Bond film, was number 1 in the US. "Notorious" was number 1 in Italy, Spain and Canada. "The Wild Boys" was number 1 in West Germany and South Africa. The band went on to sell over 100 million records and win Brit, Grammy and MTV awards.

Michael Jackson was one of the icons of the 1980s and his leather jacket, white glove, and Moonwalk dance were often imitated. Jackson's 1982 album Thriller became—and currently remains—the best-selling album of all time, with sales estimated by various sources as somewhere between 65 and 110 million copies worldwide. His 1987 album Bad sold over 45 million copies and became the first album to have five number-one singles chart on the Billboard Hot 100. Jackson had the most number-one singles throughout the decade (9), and spent the most weeks at number one (27 weeks). His 1987 Bad World Tour grossed over $125 million worldwide, making it the highest grossing world tour by a solo artist during the decade. Jackson earned numerous awards and titles during the 1980s, the most notable of which were a record eight Grammy Awards and eight American Music Awards in 1984, and the honor of "Artist of the Decade" by US President George H. W. Bush. As of 2013, estimates of his total sales worldwide had included figures of over 500 million to one billion records sold.

Prince was a popular star of the 1980s and the most successful chart act of the decade. His breakthrough album 1999, released in 1982, produced three top-ten hits and the album itself charted at number nine on the Billboard 200. His sixth studio album Purple Rain was an international success, boosting Prince to superstardom and selling over 25 million copies worldwide. The album produced the US number-one singles, "When Doves Cry" and "Let's Go Crazy" and sold 13 million copies in the US as of 1996. Prince released an album every year for the rest of the decade, all charting within the top ten, with the exception of Lovesexy. He went on to sell over 120 million records worldwide and win seven Grammy Awards.

The '80s were above all a time of international corporatization... [Rock music] was reconceived as intellectual property, as a form of capital itself... The '80s were when stars replaced artists as bearers of significance... The '80s took rock sexuality and rock sexism over the top... The '80s were a time of renewed racial turmoil after ten-plus years of polite resegregation... Technology changed everything in the '80s. Cable brought us MTV and the triumph of the image. Synthesizers inflected the sounds that remained. Sampling revolutionized rock and roll's proprietary relationship to its own history. Cassettes made private music portable—and public. Compact discs inflated profitability as they faded into the background of busy lives.

— Robert Christgau in Christgau's Record Guide: The '80s (1990)

Madonna and Whitney Houston were groundbreaking female artists of the decade. The keyboard synthesizer and drum machine were among the most popular instruments in music during the 1980s. After the 1980s, electronic instruments continued to be the main component of mainstream pop.

Synth pop and new pop musicians included the Eurythmics, Pet Shop Boys, Spandau Ballet, A Flock of Seagulls, INXS, Ultravox, Men Without Hats, Icehouse, Toni Basil, OMD, Visage, Alphaville, A-ha, Martha and the Muffins, Talk Talk and Depeche Mode. Pop rock bands included Tears for Fears and Transvision Vamp. Ska bands included Madness and The Specials.

Stock Aitken Waterman songs were sung by Bananarama, Dead or Alive, Rick Astley, Kylie Minogue and Donna Summer.

Steve Perry on the Frontiers tour in 1983. In the early 1980s, American rock band Journey had three studio albums chart in the top 10 of the Billboard 200: Departure at number 8 in 1980, Escape at number 1 in 1981, and Frontiers at number 2 in 1983.

Hard rock, heavy metal, and glam metal became some of the most dominant music genres of the decade, peaking with the arrival of such bands as Mötley Crüe, Guns N' Roses, Metallica, Iron Maiden, Bon Jovi, Def Leppard, Poison, Europe, Megadeth, Slayer, Sepultura, Anthrax, and virtuoso guitarists such as Joe Satriani and Yngwie Malmsteen. The scene also helped 1970s hard rock artists and bands such as AC/DC, Heart, Ozzy Osbourne, Black Sabbath, Aerosmith, Alice Cooper, Blue Öyster Cult, Deep Purple, Queen, Van Halen, Journey, Kiss, Ronnie James Dio, Rush and Judas Priest reach a new generation of fans.

The 1980s were also known for song parodies becoming more mainstream, a trend led by parodic musician "Weird Al" Yankovic. He was best known for his Michael Jackson parodies "Eat It" and "Fat" as well as other parodies like "Another One Rides The Bus" (parody of "Another One Bites The Dust" by Queen).

By 1989, the hip-hop scene had evolved, gaining recognition and exhibiting a stronger influence on the music industry. This time period is also considered part of the golden age of hip-hop. The Beastie Boys, Public Enemy, Run-D.M.C., Grandmaster Flash, the Furious Five, N.W.A, LL Cool J, De La Soul, A Tribe Called Quest, Ice-T, DJ Jazzy Jeff & The Fresh Prince, Tone Lōc, Biz Markie, The Sugar Hill Gang and others experienced success in this genre.

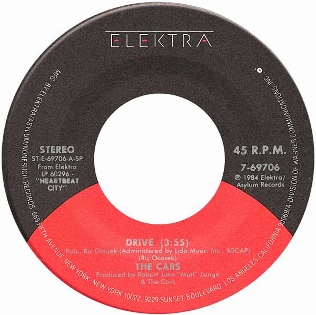
The A-side vinyl press of "Drive" by The Cars. One of the band's most popular singles, it peaked at number 1 on the Billboard Adult contemporary chart, and number 3 on the Billboard Hot 100 in 1984.

Country music advanced into a new realm of popularity with youth appeal and record-breaking marks. Groundbreaking artists such as Alabama, Hank Williams Jr., Reba McEntire, George Strait, Ricky Skaggs, Janie Fricke, The Judds, and Randy Travis achieved multiple platinum and award status, foreshadowing the genre's popularity explosion in the 1990s. Country artists from past decades, such as George Jones, Waylon Jennings, Willie Nelson, Conway Twitty, the Oak Ridge Boys, Kenny Rogers, Dolly Parton, Merle Haggard, Don Williams, Crystal Gayle, Ronnie Milsap, Barbara Mandrell, and the Statler Brothers, also remained popular and continued to score hits throughout the decade.

The techno style of electronic dance music emerged in Detroit, Michigan, during the mid to late 1980s. The house music style, another form of electronic dance music, emerged in Chicago, Illinois, in the early 1980s. It was initially popularized in mid-1980s discothèques catering to the African-American, Latino and gay communities, first in Chicago, then in New York City and Detroit. It eventually reached Europe before becoming infused in mainstream pop and dance music worldwide.

Leading punk rock bands included Black Flag, Minor Threat, Suicidal Tendencies and Minutemen. Punk rock gave birth to many subgenres like hardcore, which in turn gave birth to a few counterculture movements, most notably the Straight Edge movement which began in the early 1980s. College rock caught on in the underground scene of the 1980s in a nationwide movement with a distinct D.I.Y approach. Bands such as the Pixies, R.E.M., The Replacements, Sonic Youth, XTC, The Smiths, Echo & the Bunnymen, The Stone Roses, The Jesus and Mary Chain experienced success in this genre. The 1980s also saw the birth of the grunge genre, with the arrival of such bands as Soundgarden and Nirvana.

Siouxsie and the Banshees and Pigbag were post punk bands. New Order and U2 had post punk origins.

Former Beatle John Lennon and Yoko Ono released their joint number 1 album Double Fantasy in November 1980. This was Lennon's final album before his murder in December 1980. Led Zeppelin disbanded after drummer John Bonham's 1980 death. Brian Johnson became lead singer of AC/DC after predecessor Bon Scott died in 1980. Reggae musician Bob Marley died from a lentiginous skin melanoma in 1981. Motown singer Marvin Gaye was shot dead by his father in 1984. Airplane crashes killed Ozzy Osbourne's guitarist Randy Rhoads in 1982, and Kyu Sakamoto in 1985. Karen Carpenter died from complications of anorexia nervosa in 1983. Her death resulted in widespread attention and research into eating disorders and body dysmorphia. Other deaths include Tim Hardin in 1980, Harry Chapin in 1981, Metallica bassist Cliff Burton in 1986, Andy Gibb in 1988 and Hibari Misora in 1989.

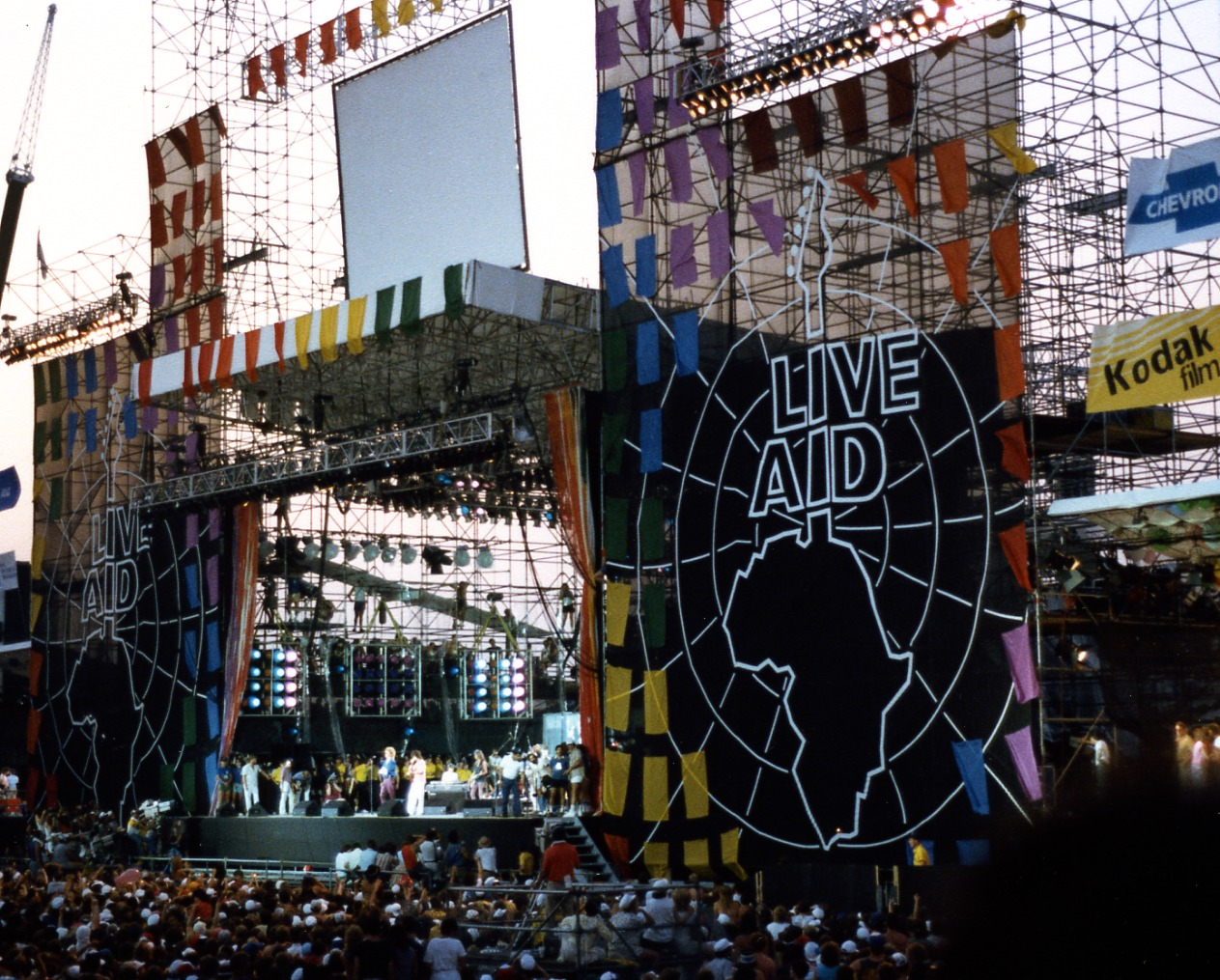
Live Aid concert at Philadelphia's JFK Stadium in 1985

In 1984, the British supergroup Band Aid was formed to raise aid and awareness of the economic plight of Ethiopia. In 1985's Live Aid concert, featuring many artists, promoted attention and action to send food aid to Ethiopia whose people were suffering from a major famine.

During the 1980s, Japan had the second largest music market in the world. Popular music included kayōkyoku, idols, new music, rock and techno-pop. Artists and bands included Seiko Matsuda, Akina Nakamori, Hiroko Yakushimaru, Tomoyo Harada, Yōko Oginome, Yoko Minamino, Chisato Moritaka, Wink, Saki Kubota, Rebecca, Kome Kome Club, the Southern All Stars, Eiichi Ohtaki and Yellow Magic Orchestra. The song "Hana" by Shoukichi Kina, was a hit overseas, and sold 30 million copies.

Argentine rock reached its highest popularity and commercial success. Argentine bands such as Soda Stereo became widely acclaimed throughout Latin America. The underground culture in Buenos Aires created many bands that would become household names, like reggae rock band Sumo and post-punk Los Redondos. Charly García left his supergroup Seru Giran and started a successful solo career with the Argentine rock album Clics Modernos. Luis Alberto Spinetta also thrived as a solo musician, while Andrés Calamaro, along with Miguel Abuelo, leaded Los Abuelos de la Nada, which would go on to compose Mil Horas, a rock anthem in all the Spanish-speaking world.

Artists singing in Italian included Al Bano and Romina Power and Matia Bazar. Rondò Veneziano were a baroque pop outfit.

Artists who topped the US annual album chart included Pink Floyd, REO Speedwagon, Asia, Bruce Springsteen, George Michael and Bobby Brown. Artists who topped the US annual singles chart included Blondie, Kim Carnes, Olivia Newton-John, The Police, Wham!, Dionne & Friends (which consisted of Dionne Warwick, Elton John, Gladys Knight and Stevie Wonder) and The Bangles.

The UK best selling album of the 1980s was by Dire Straits. The best selling single was by Band Aid. Artists who topped the UK annual singles chart included The Human League, Dexys Midnight Runners, Culture Club, Jennifer Rush, The Communards, Cliff Richard and Black Box. Artists who topped the UK annual albums chart included ABBA, Adam and the Ants, Barbra Streisand and Jason Donovan.

Other famous and popular female singers included Belinda Carlisle, Bette Midler, Bonnie Tyler, Celine Dion, Debbie Gibson, Deniece Williams, Diana Ross, Gloria Estefan, Janet Jackson, Joan Jett, Kate Bush, Kim Wilde, Laura Branigan, Martika, Nena, Pat Benatar, Paula Abdul, Samantha Fox, Sheena Easton, Tiffany Darwish and Tina Turner. Other famous and popular male singers included Billy Joel, Billy Ocean, Bob Dylan, Bryan Adams, David Bowie, Don Henley, Frank Sinatra, Freddie Mercury, George Harrison, Nik Kershaw, Paul McCartney, Paul Young, Phil Collins, Rick Springfield, Robert Palmer, Sting and Terence Trent D'Arby.

Other famous and popular bands included Bee Gees, Boston, Cheap Trick, The Cure, Fleetwood Mac, Foreigner, Frankie Goes to Hollywood, Genesis, Hall & Oates, Imagination, The Jackson 5, KC and the Sunshine Band, Kool & the Gang, Lipps Inc., Miami Sound Machine, Mike and the Mechanics, Men at Work, Motörhead, New Kids on the Block, The Pointer Sisters, The Rolling Stones, The Stranglers, Tight Fit, Toto, UB40, Whitesnake, Yes and ZZ Top.

Other artists with US number 1 singles included John Cougar, Captain & Tennille, Rupert Holmes, Eddie Rabbitt, Stars on 45, Air Supply, The J. Geils Band, Steve Miller Band, Patti Austin, James Ingram, John Waite, Huey Lewis and the News, Ready for the World, Jan Hammer, Mr. Mister, Marilyn Martin, Falco, Simply Red, Peter Cetera, Amy Grant, Steve Winwood, Patti LaBelle, Michael McDonald, Bruce Hornsby, Gregory Abbott, Billy Vera, Club Nouveau, Aretha Franklin, Cutting Crew, Lisa Lisa and Cult Jam, Atlantic Starr, Los Lobos, Bob Seger, Siedah Garrett, Billy Idol, Exposé, Bobby McFerrin, Richard Marx, The Beach Boys, The Escape Club, Will to Power, Sheriff, Roxette, Fine Young Cannibals, Michael Damian, Milli Vanilli and Bad English.

In theatre, the decade paved the way for what are now known as the megamusical, with examples such as Cats, Starlight Express, Les Misérables, The Phantom of the Opera, and Miss Saigon.

In music radio, Casey Kasem hosted American Top 40 and Casey's Top 40.

Other artists with US number 1 albums include Journey and Stevie Nicks.

French musicians included Florent Pagny, F.R. David, France Gall, Jean-Jacques Goldman, Johnny Hallyday, Julie Pietri, Julien Clerc, Michel Berger, Patrick Bruel and Renaud. Austrian, Dutch and German musicians included C. C. Catch, Dschinghis Khan, Joy, Modern Talking and Sandra Cretu. Other popular musicians included Bad Boys Blue, Baltimora, Demis Roussos and Ryan Paris.

- Oscar winners for Best Song: "Fame" (Irene Cara), "Arthur's Theme (Best That You Can Do)" (Christopher Cross), "Up Where We Belong" (Joe Cocker and Jennifer Warnes), "Flashdance... What a Feeling", "I Just Called to Say I Love You" (Stevie Wonder), "Say You, Say Me" (Lionel Richie), "Take My Breath Away" (Berlin), "(I've Had) The Time of My Life" (Bill Medley and Jennifer Warnes), "Let the River Run" (Carly Simon) and "Under the Sea".

Other artists contributing music to cinema films included Vangelis, Limahl, Ray Parker Jr., Survivor, Starship, Simple Minds, Kenny Loggins, Azumi Inoue, Michael Sembello, Lindsey Buckingham and John Parr.

Other musicians included Earth, Wind & Fire, Frank Zappa, Gloria Gaynor, Jerry Lee Lewis, Little Richard, Luther Vandross, Paul Anka, Queensrÿche, Simon & Garfunkel, Stevie Ray Vaughan, Talking Heads, Twisted Sister and the Village People.

=== Film ===
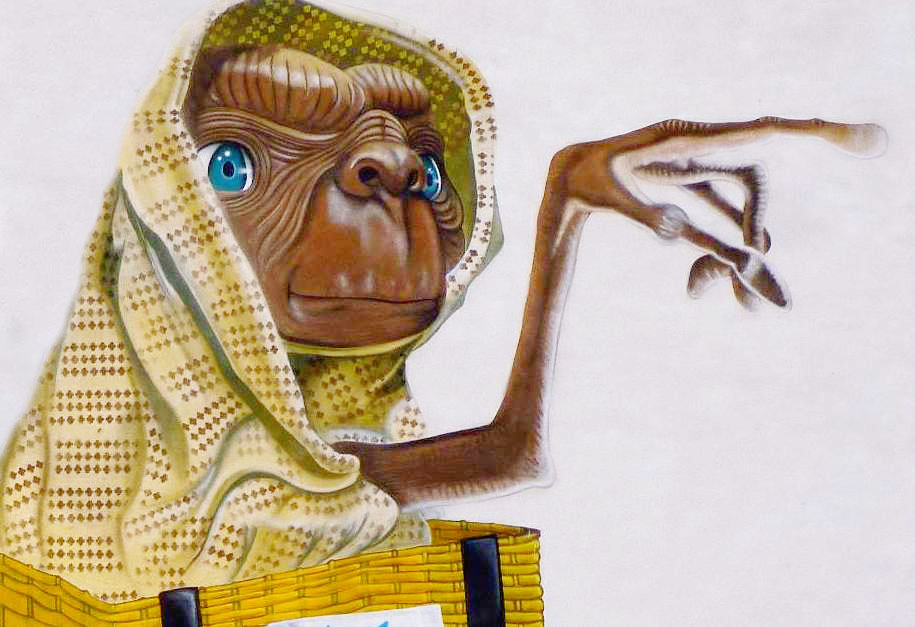
The highest-grossing film of the decade was E.T. the Extra-Terrestrial (1982)

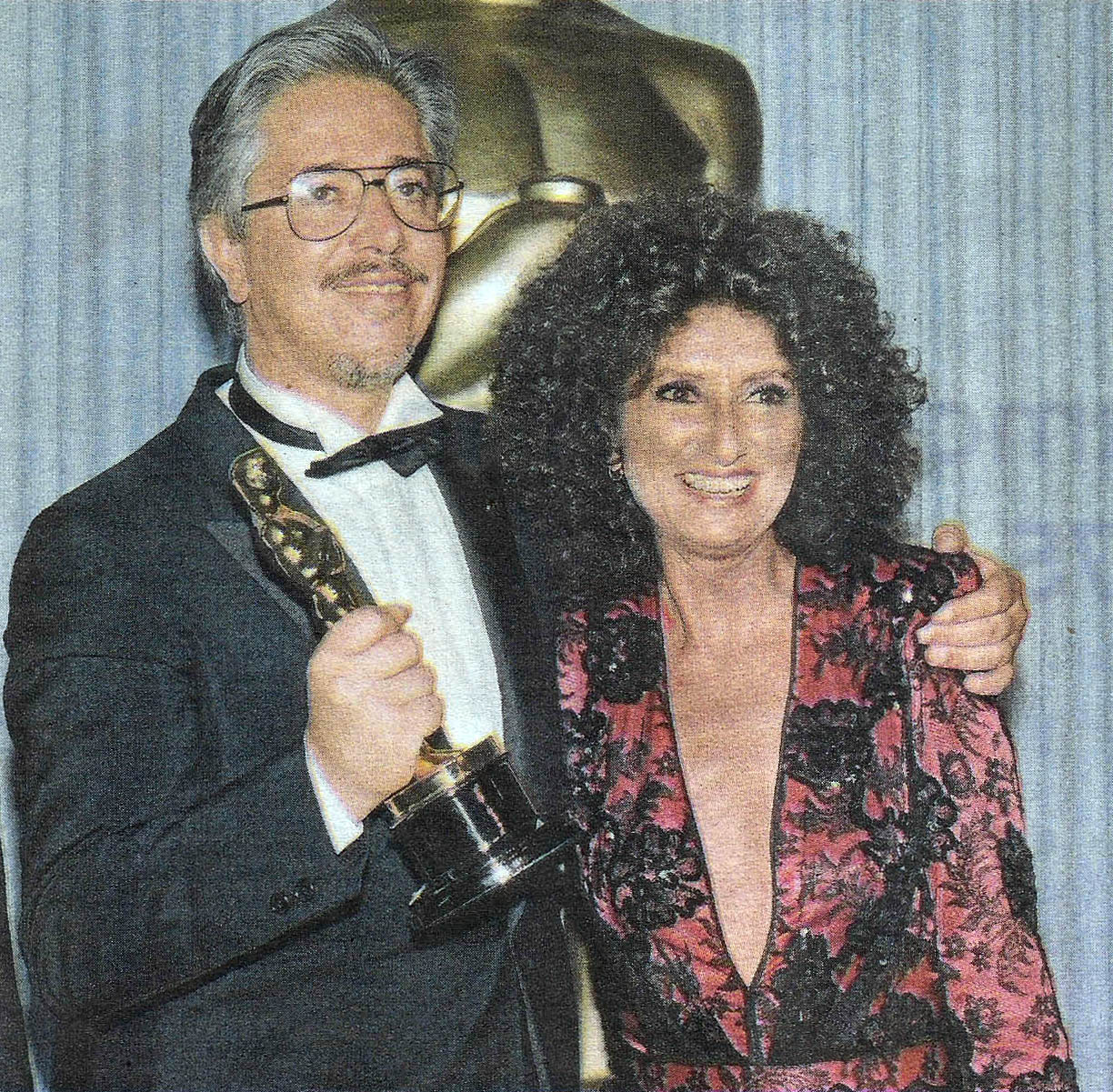
Director Luis Puenzo and actress Norma Leandro from Argentina celebrating the Oscar won by The Official Story at the 58th Academy Awards

Critically acclaimed films and thespians

- Oscar winners for Best Picture: Ordinary People, Chariots of Fire, Gandhi, Terms of Endearment, Amadeus, Out of Africa, Platoon, The Last Emperor, Rain Man and Driving Miss Daisy.
- Palme d'Or recipients at the Cannes Film Festival: All That Jazz, Kagemusha, Man of Iron, Missing, Yol, The Ballad of Narayama, Paris, Texas, When Father Was Away on Business, The Mission, Under the Sun of Satan, Pelle the Conqueror and Sex, Lies, and Videotape.
- The highest-grossing films of the decade are (in order from highest to lowest domestic grossing): E.T. the Extra-Terrestrial, Return of the Jedi, The Empire Strikes Back, Indiana Jones and the Last Crusade, Batman, Rain Man, Raiders of the Lost Ark, Ghostbusters, Back to the Future, Who Framed Roger Rabbit, Top Gun, Indiana Jones and the Temple of Doom, Back to the Future Part II, Crocodile Dundee, Fatal Attraction and Beverly Hills Cop.
- Oscar winners for Best Foreign Language Film: Moscow Does Not Believe in Tears, Mephisto, Begin the Beguine, Fanny and Alexander, Dangerous Moves, The Official Story, The Assault, Babette's Feast, Pelle the Conqueror and Cinema Paradiso.
- Oscar winners for Best Actor: Robert De Niro, Henry Fonda, Ben Kingsley, Robert Duvall, F. Murray Abraham, William Hurt, Paul Newman, Michael Douglas, Dustin Hoffman and Daniel Day-Lewis.
- Oscar winners for Best Actress: Sissy Spacek, Katharine Hepburn, Meryl Streep, Shirley MacLaine, Sally Field, Geraldine Page, Marlee Matlin, Cher, Jodie Foster and Jessica Tandy.

The film industry

The 1980s saw the return of studio-driven films, coming from the filmmaker-driven New Hollywood era of the 1970s. The period was when 'high concept' films gained popularity, where movies were to be easily marketable and understandable, and, therefore, they had short cinematic plots that could be summarized in one or two sentences. The modern Hollywood blockbuster is the most popular film format from the 1980s. Producer Don Simpson is usually credited with the creation of the high-concept picture of the modern Hollywood blockbuster. In the mid-1980s, a wave of British directors, including Ridley Scott, Alan Parker, Adrian Lyne and Tony Scott (with the latter directing a number of Don Simpson films) ushered in a new era of blockbusters using the crowd-pleasing skills they had honed in UK television commercials.

A significant development in the home media business is the establishment of The Criterion Collection in 1984, an American company "dedicated to gathering the greatest films from around the world and publishing them in editions that offer the highest technical quality". Through their releases, they were able to introduce what is now a standard to home video: letterboxing to retain the original aspect ratio, film commentaries and supplements/special features.

Live-action films

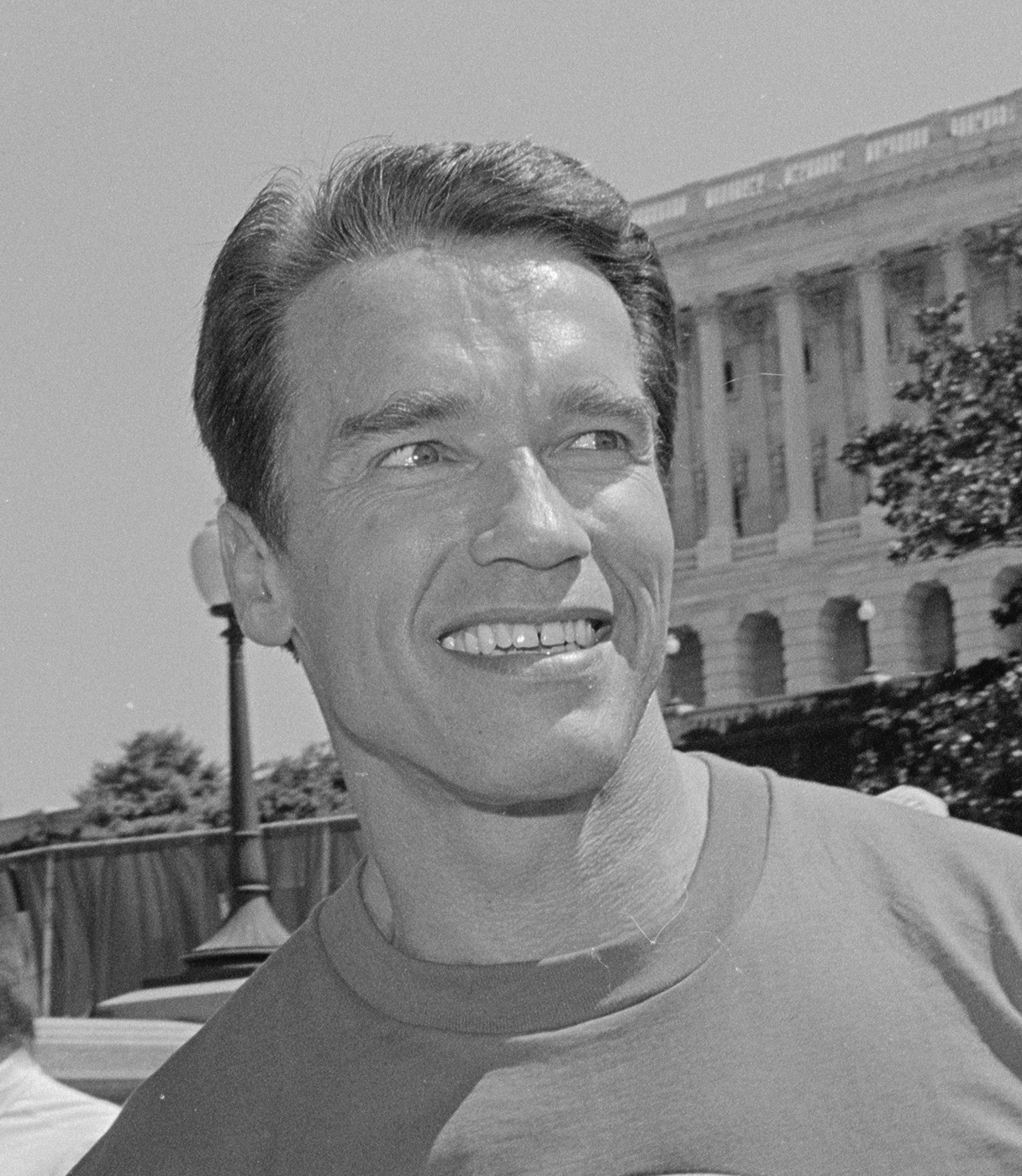
Action movie star Arnold Schwarzenegger rose to international fame this decade with The Terminator (1984)

The 1980s saw the golden age of teen films. Class, Fast Times at Ridgemont High, Risky Business, Mannequin, Porky's, Valley Girl, and John Hughes directed or written Sixteen Candles, The Breakfast Club, Weird Science, Ferris Bueller's Day Off, Pretty in Pink and Some Kind of Wonderful, were popular teen comedies, and their stars include Emilio Estevez, Anthony Michael Hall, Jennifer Jason Leigh, Andrew McCarthy, Rob Lowe, Judd Nelson, Molly Ringwald, Ally Sheedy, Matthew Broderick, Tom Cruise, Rebecca De Mornay, Sean Penn and Nicolas Cage. Other youth dramas include Stand by Me and Francis Ford Coppola directed The Outsiders and Rumble Fish. Their stars include River Phoenix and Mickey Rourke. The Brat Pack films are said to include The Breakfast Club and St. Elmo's Fire. Musical dance films include Footloose, Dirty Dancing and Flashdance, and their stars include Kevin Bacon and Patrick Swayze. Other musicals include Annie.

Horror films were a popular genre during the decade. Among the most popular horror franchises of the 1980s were the Friday the 13th, A Nightmare on Elm Street, Halloween, Child's Play, Hellraiser, and Poltergeist franchises. Their casts include Jamie Lee Curtis, Robert Englund, Catherine Hicks, Chris Sarandon and Brad Dourif. The Shining was initially met with mixed reviews from critics, and even from the author of the book, and was moderately financially successful, but later became very popular and critically acclaimed. The concept of the B horror film gave rise to many horror films that went on to earn cult status, such as The Evil Dead, which was directed by Sam Raimi. Comedy horror films included Beetlejuice, Gremlins, Little Shop of Horrors and The Lost Boys. Their stars include Alec Baldwin, Geena Davis, Winona Ryder, Zach Galligan, Phoebe Cates, Corey Feldman, Corey Haim and Kiefer Sutherland.

Comedies included The Blues Brothers, Caddyshack, Stir Crazy, Private Benjamin, 9 to 5, Trading Places, Splash, Jumpin' Jack Flash, Three Men and a Baby, Harry and the Hendersons, Throw Momma from the Train, Planes, Trains and Automobiles, Twins, The 'Burbs and the original two Ghostbusters films, and their stars included Dan Aykroyd, Chevy Chase, Gene Wilder, Richard Pryor, Goldie Hawn, Jane Fonda, Tom Hanks, Whoopi Goldberg, Ted Danson, Steve Guttenberg, Tom Selleck, John Lithgow, Danny DeVito, Billy Crystal, Ernie Hudson, Rick Moranis, Steve Martin and John Candy. Parody films include Airplane!, Spaceballs, and The Naked Gun: From the Files of Police Squad!, which starred the likes of Moranis, Candy, and Leslie Nielsen. Romcoms include Look Who's Talking, starring John Travolta. Good Morning, Vietnam is a war comedy starring Robin Williams and Forest Whitaker. Action comedies include 48 Hrs., Romancing the Stone and The Jewel of the Nile. Their stars include Nick Nolte and Kathleen Turner.

Biopic films also saw its golden age in the 1980s, primarily about famous musicians; beginning in 1980 with Coal Miner's Daughter (biopic of Loretta Lynn), Sweet Dreams (1985 biopic of Patsy Cline), La Bamba, (1987 biopic of Ritchie Valens), and Great Balls of Fire!, (1989 biopic of Jerry Lee Lewis).

The most popular action film franchises introduced during the 1980s were the Indiana Jones, Die Hard, Lethal Weapon, and Rambo franchises. Other popular action films from the decade include The Terminator, Aliens, Mad Max 2, Escape from New York, Red Dawn, Predator, RoboCop, the Dirty Harry film Sudden Impact and Cobra. Stars of these films included Arnold Schwarzenegger, Bruce Willis, Alan Rickman, Sigourney Weaver, Mel Gibson, Danny Glover, Joe Pesci, Charlie Sheen, Linda Hamilton, Michael Biehn, Lance Henriksen, Gary Busey, Harrison Ford, Karen Allen, Peter Weller, Nancy Allen, Kurt Russell, Clint Eastwood, Sylvester Stallone, Brigitte Nielsen, Vernon Wells and Brian Dennehy. Hong Kong action cinema and martial arts films were revolutionized by a new wave of inventive filmmakers that included Jackie Chan, Sammo Hung, Tsui Hark, and John Woo. American martial arts films had actors such as Chuck Norris, Jean-Claude Van Damme and Steven Seagal, and included The Karate Kid. Sports drama included The Natural and the two Rocky films, whose stars included Carl Weathers and Dolph Lundgren.

Five more James Bond films were released, with Roger Moore continuing in the role in For Your Eyes Only, Octopussy and A View to a Kill, before handing over the role to Timothy Dalton who starred in The Living Daylights and Licence to Kill.

The post-2000 popularity of blockbuster superhero films is attributed in part to the start such blockbuster films gained in the 1980s, starting with Salkind's Superman film series 1978–1987 and bookended at the end of the decade with Tim Burton's 1989 Batman. Their stars include Christopher Reeve, Gene Hackman, Michael Keaton, Kim Basinger and Jack Nicholson.

The popularity of science fiction films in the 1980s is attributable to the popularity of the original Star Wars trilogy (1977–1983). Science fiction films include Blade Runner, Outland, The Return of Godzilla, The Dead Zone, The Fly, The Abyss, The Running Man, Flash Gordon, Innerspace, Bill & Ted's Excellent Adventure and Back to the Future. Their stars include Mark Hamill, Carrie Fisher, Alec Guinness, James Earl Jones, Rutger Hauer, Daryl Hannah, Jeff Goldblum, Max von Sydow, Dennis Quaid, Meg Ryan, Michael J. Fox, Christopher Lloyd, Lea Thompson and Keanu Reeves. Sword and sorcery films include Excalibur and Conan the Barbarian. Other fantasy films include Time Bandits, The Dark Crystal, The NeverEnding Story and The Witches of Eastwick, starring Michelle Pfeiffer and Susan Sarandon.

Westerns include Urban Cowboy, The Man from Snowy River and Mother Lode. Period dramas include The Bostonians. Historical epics include The Right Stuff, Kagemusha and Ran. War films include Platoon, Full Metal Jacket and Das Boot. Their stars include Tom Berenger, Willem Dafoe, Matthew Modine and Jürgen Prochnow. Romances include An Officer and a Gentleman, starring Richard Gere, Debra Winger and Louis Gossett Jr.

Neo-noir films include Blow Out and Blue Velvet. Mob films include Once Upon a Time in America, Scarface and The Untouchables. Their stars include Al Pacino and Kevin Costner.

Sailor Suit and Machine Gun is a satirical yakuza film. Other popular Japanese films included Imperial Navy, Antarctica, Legend of the Eight Samurai, The Burmese Harp, The Adventures of Milo and Otis, Hachikō Monogatari and The Silk Road.

Gérard Depardieu starred in the French films La Chèvre, The Last Metro, Danton, Police and Jean de Florette. Luc Besson directed The Big Blue. Jean-Jacques Annaud directed Quest for Fire and The Bear.

Animated films

After leaving Disney in 1979, Don Bluth formed his own studio and went on direct The Secret of NIMH, An American Tail, The Land Before Time and All Dogs Go to Heaven. The Disney studio was almost bankrupted after The Black Cauldron bombed at the box office. They began to recover with the modest success of Ron Clements and John Musker directed The Great Mouse Detective. The live-action animated hybrid Robert Zemeckis directed Who Framed Roger Rabbit co-produced with Steven Spielberg was successful, and the Disney Renaissance began with The Little Mermaid, starring Jodi Benson.

Animated films based on popular works include Bon Voyage, Charlie Brown (and Don't Come Back!!), Heavy Metal, The Adventures of Mark Twain, The Care Bears Movie, The Transformers: The Movie and The Chipmunk Adventure; while original films include The Last Unicorn, The Plague Dogs, Rock & Rule, Fire and Ice, Abra Cadabra, The Brave Little Toaster, The BFG, and the first Wallace & Gromit film, A Grand Day Out.

The 1980s also saw a surge of Japanese anime films: Hayao Miyazaki's The Castle of Cagliostro and Nausicaä of the Valley of the Wind were successful and led to the foundation of Studio Ghibli, which produced the successful Castle in the Sky, My Neighbor Totoro, Grave of the Fireflies and Kiki's Delivery Service in the 1980s. Other well-known anime films of that decade include Golgo 13: The Professional, Macross: Do You Remember Love?, Lensman, Vampire Hunter D, Akira, Little Nemo: Adventures in Slumberland and the Urusei Yatsura film series. The first theatrical animated franchise, the Doraemon film series began in 1980 with the release of Doraemon: Nobita's Dinosaur.

=== Television ===
Music video channel MTV was launched in the United States in 1981 and had a profound impact on the music industry and popular culture, especially in the 1980s and early 1990s.

The 1980s was a decade of transformation in television. Cable television became more accessible and therefore, more popular. By the middle of the decade, almost 70% of the US population had cable television and over 85% were paying for cable services such as HBO or Showtime. People who lived in rural areas where cable TV service was not available could still access cable channels through a large (and expensive) satellite dish, which, by the mid-1990s, was phased out in favor of the small rooftop dishes that offer DirecTV and Dish Network services.

CNN and Bravo began in 1980; Channel 4, Rete 4 and Italia 1 in 1982; RTL and Canal+ in 1984; Fox in 1986; M6 in 1987; Turner Network Television in 1988; CNBC and ProSieben in 1989.

New prime-time soap operas included Dallas, its spin-off Knots Landing, Dynasty, Falcon Crest, EastEnders and Neighbours. Their stars included Larry Hagman, Linda Gray, Patrick Duffy, Victoria Principal, John Forsythe, Joan Collins, Linda Evans and Heather Locklear.

During the 1980s, sitcoms were popular, including Bosom Buddies, Family Ties, Newhart, Too Close for Comfort, The Cosby Show, Night Court, Full House, The Wonder Years and Married... with Children. Sitcom Cheers starred Kirstie Alley, Woody Harrelson, Shelley Long, Rhea Perlman, John Ratzenberger, George Wendt. Taxi starred Marilu Henner, Judd Hirsch, Tony Danza and Andy Kaufman. Who's the Boss? starred Judith Light and Alyssa Milano. The Golden Girls, was the first comedy ever to feature four older women in title TV roles. Designing Women starred Dixie Carter, Annie Potts and Delta Burke. Marla Gibbs starred in The Jeffersons and 227, which also starred Jackée Harry. Other sitcoms included Growing Pains and the British Blackadder, 'Allo 'Allo!, The Young Ones and Only Fools and Horses.

Sketch comedy and variety show Saturday Night Live experienced turbulence for much of the 1980s. Its cast members included Jim Belushi, Bill Murray, Eddie Murphy, Martin Short, and Julia Louis-Dreyfus. Other comedy sketch shows included Not the Nine O'Clock News, The Kenny Everett Television Show and the influential and popular Oretachi Hyokinzoku (sometimes called "We Are Wild and Crazy Guys").

Legal dramas included Matlock, which starred Andy Griffith as Matlock, and also starred Nancy Stafford and Clarence Gilyard Jr. Cop shows included Dempsey and Makepeace, Miami Vice, Cagney & Lacey, 21 Jump Street, Hill Street Blues and The Bill. Other crime shows included Murder, She Wrote. Their stars included Don Johnson, Philip Michael Thomas, Tyne Daly, Sharon Gless, Johnny Depp and Angela Lansbury.

Science fiction included Blake's 7, V, Buck Rogers, Star Trek: The Next Generation (starring Patrick Stewart), Red Dwarf, ALF, Airwolf, Knight Rider and Quantum Leap. Adventure series included The A-Team, Robin of Sherwood, The Dukes of Hazzard and Remington Steele.

Musicals included Fame. Television magicians included David Copperfield and Paul Daniels. Stand-up comedians included Steven Wright, Andrew Dice Clay and Sam Kinison. Dancers included Gregory Hines.

TV talk shows expanded in popularity; The Tonight Show Starring Johnny Carson remained popular into its third decade, and some of the most viewed newer shows were hosted by Geraldo Rivera, Arsenio Hall and David Letterman.

TV documentary shows of the 1980s that were popular included Frontline, Michael Palin: Around the World in 80 Days, Unsolved Mysteries with Robert Stack, and Rescue 911 with William Shatner.

The Wedding of Prince Charles and Lady Diana Spencer was watched by an estimated global television audience of 750 million people in 1981.

Scandal rocked TV evangelism when in 1987 evangelist Jim Bakker, founder of PTL and Heritage USA, was defrocked for having an affair years earlier and later sent to prison for fraud. One year later, evangelist Jimmy Swaggart was defrocked for allegedly having sexual relations with a prostitute.

The 1980s was prominent for spawning popular animated shows such as The Smurfs, ThunderCats, The Transformers, The Super Mario Bros. Super Show!, Henry's Cat, Danger Mouse, Count Duckula, Alias the Jester, Yakari, Lucky Luke, Heathcliff (Mel Blanc's final series), Masters of the Universe, Inspector Gadget, Alvin and the Chipmunks, Bananaman, Thomas & Friends, Muppet Babies, Teenage Mutant Ninja Turtles, Babar, The Raccoons, DuckTales, Chip 'n Dale: Rescue Rangers, Dennis the Menace, M.A.S.K., Care Bears, Rainbow Brite, Garfield and Friends, Pingu, Postman Pat and Fireman Sam.

The earliest The Simpsons shorts aired on The Tracey Ullman Show, and the earliest series of The Simpsons appeared. In 1980, Astro Boy was remade in color. Other anime series from the 1980s include Wowser, Ulysses 31, The Mysterious Cities of Gold, Dominion, Voltron, Super Dimension Fortress Macross, Fist of the North Star, Gundam and Star Blazers.

=== Sports ===
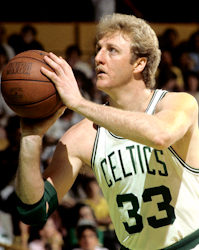
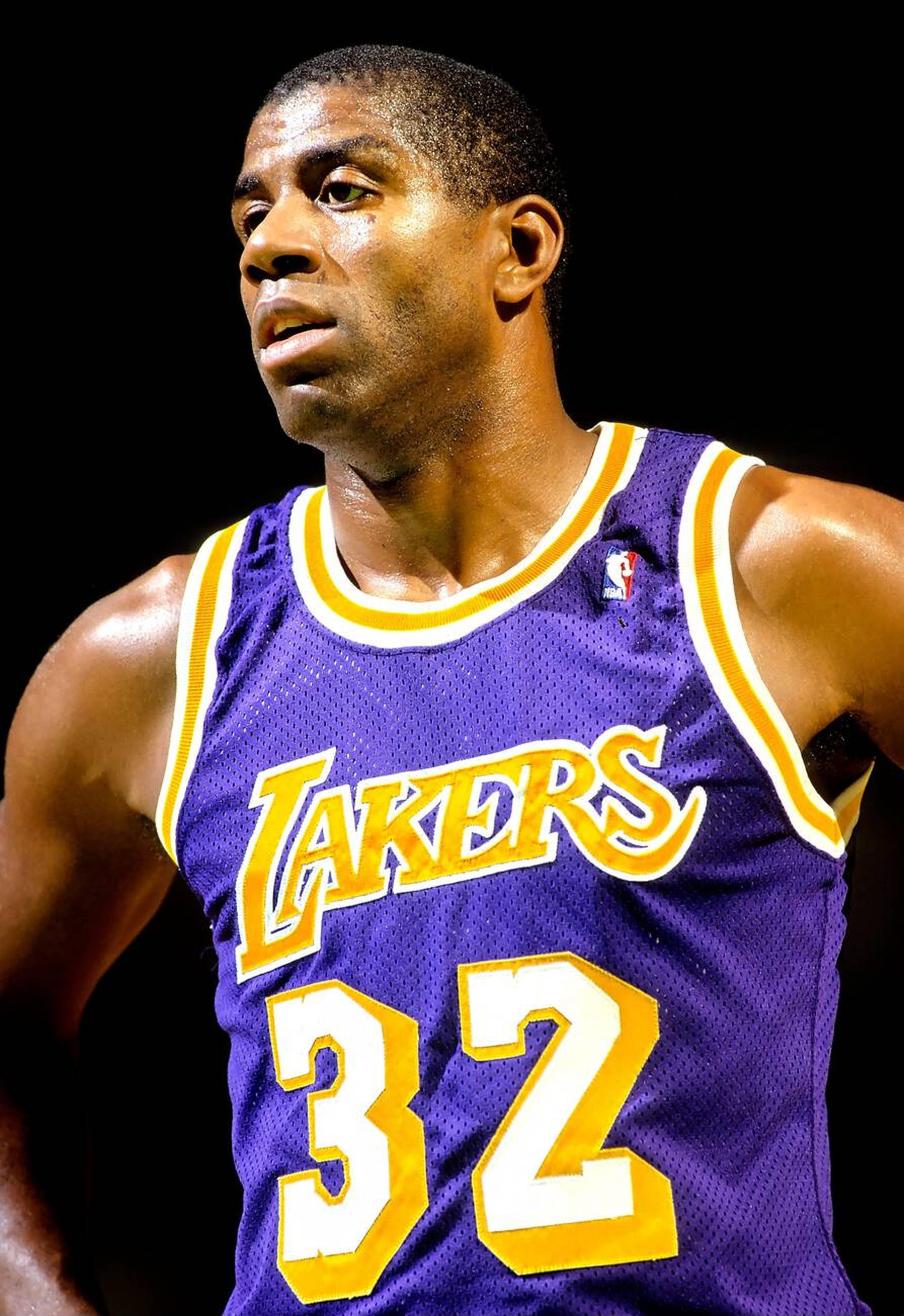
Larry Bird (left) and Magic Johnson, the two most popular NBA players of the 1980s.
- The 1980 Summer Olympics in Moscow were boycotted by 65 countries led by the United States in protest of the 1979 Soviet invasion of Afghanistan.
- A young United States team famously defeated the heavily favored Soviet team in the Miracle on Ice game, and went on to win the gold medal for ice hockey, at the 1980 Winter Olympics.
- The New York Islanders won the Stanley Cup for four straight years in 1980, 1981, 1982, and 1983. The Islanders also became the second NHL expansion team after the Philadelphia Flyers to win the Cup. Since their last Cup win in 1983, they were the third NHL team to win four consecutive championships and hold the NHL record for most consecutive playoff series' wins at 19 (stretching from the 1980 Playoffs to the 1984 Playoffs).
- The Edmonton Eskimos of the Canadian Football League won the first three Grey Cup championships of the decade (having won the last two of the previous decade), adding one more in 1987.
- India won the 1983 Cricket World Cup. Australia won 1987 Cricket World Cup.
- The 1984 Winter Olympics were held in Sarajevo, Yugoslavia (now Sarajevo, Bosnia and Herzegovina). Yugoslavia became the second communist country to host the Olympic Games, but unlike the Soviet Union in 1980, there were no boycotts of the Games by Western countries.
- The 1984 Summer Olympics in Los Angeles were boycotted by the Soviet Union and most of the Communist world (China, Romania, and Yugoslavia participated in the games) in retaliation for the boycott of the 1980 Games in Moscow.
- The Jamaica national bobsled team received major media attention and stunned the world at the 1988 Winter Olympics in Calgary, Alberta, Canada for its unexpected good performance. The events surrounding the Jamaica bobsled team in 1988 would lead to the creation of the Disney movie Cool Runnings five years later.
- The 1988 Summer Olympics were held in Seoul, South Korea. Attempts to include North Korea in the games were unsuccessful and it boycotted along with six other countries, but with 160 nations participating, it had the highest attendance of any Olympics to date.

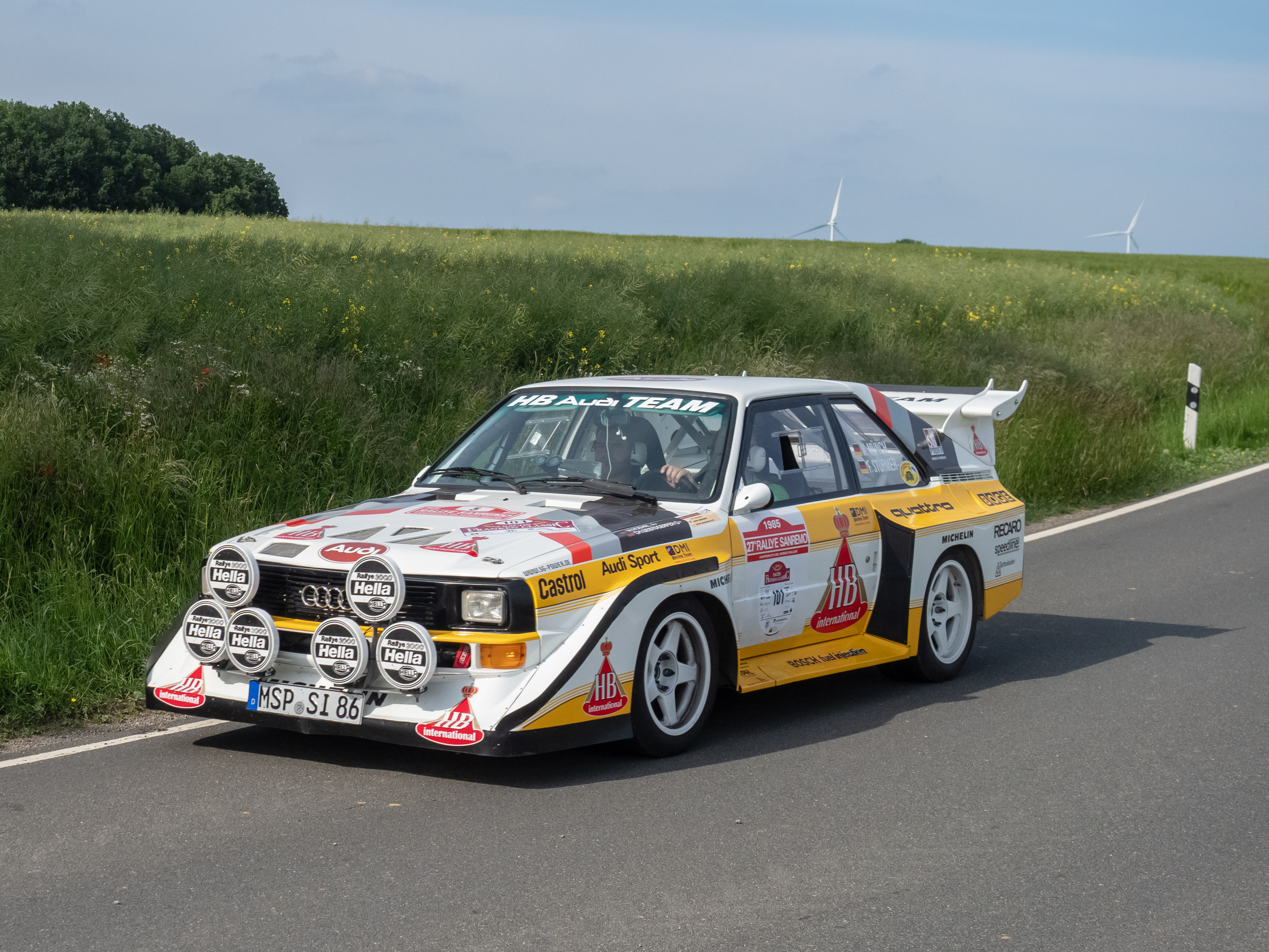
Audi Sport Quattro S1 E2

- FIA banned Group B rallying after a series of deaths and injuries took place in the 1986 season.
- Canadian hockey player Wayne Gretzky's rise to fame in the NHL coincided with the Edmonton Oilers' first four Stanley Cup championships (1984, 1985, 1987, and 1988) and becoming the second NHL dynasty team of the 1980s.
- On 9 August 1988, in what became the biggest trade in NHL history (also known as "The Trade Of The Century"), Wayne Gretzky was traded along with teammates Marty McSorley and Mike Krushelnyski from Edmonton to the Los Angeles Kings in exchange for Martin Gélinas, Jimmy Carson, three first-round draft picks, and US$15 million cash (approximately $18 million CAD in 1988).
- American basketball player Michael Jordan joined the NBA during the mid-1980s, raising the sport's popularity. He started his professional career alongside the likes of Hakeem Olajuwon, Charles Barkley, Alvin Robertson, and John Stockton in what is considered one of the greatest drafts in the league's history, the 1984 NBA draft.
- On 26 November 1986, Mike Tyson became the youngest boxing Heavyweight Champion in history at age 20.
- The 1980s professional wrestling boom was in full effect.
- In 1985, the WWF presented the WrestleMania I at Madison Square Garden in New York City with an attendance of 19,121.
- In 1987, WrestleMania III had a record attendance of 93,173, the largest recorded attendance for a live indoor sporting event in North America until 2010. This also remained the WrestleMania attendance record until WrestleMania 32 in 2016
- In 1988, the live broadcast of WWF's The Main Event I drew a 15.2 Nielsen rating and 33 million viewers, both records for American televised wrestling.
- West Germany won the 1980 UEFA championship.
- Italy won the 1982 FIFA World Cup in Spain.
- France hosted and won the 1984 UEFA championship.
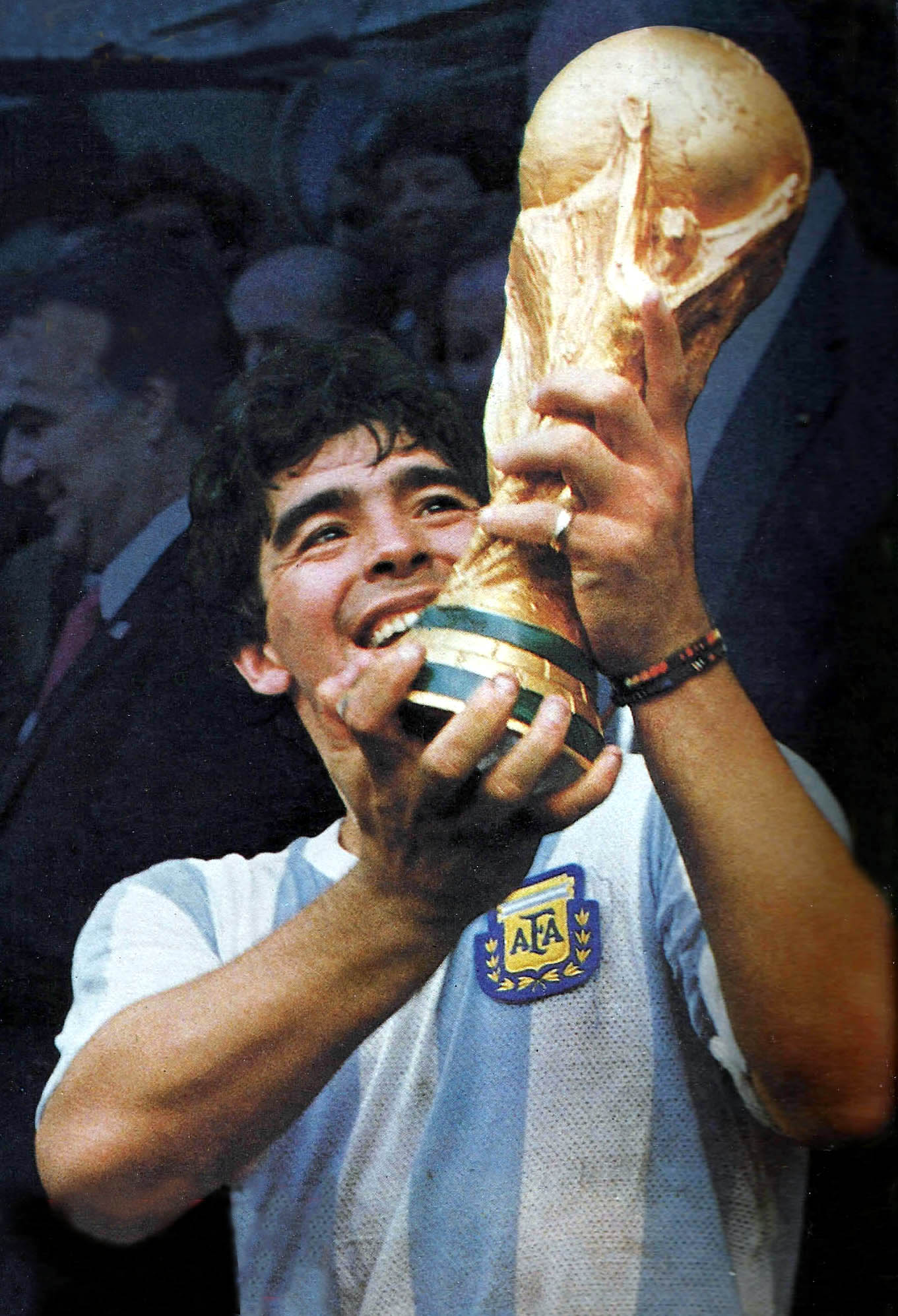
- Diego Maradona raising the World Cup Trophy after Argentina won the final in 1986
  Argentina won the 1986 FIFA World Cup in Mexico. Diego Maradona produces the Goal of the Century and the hand of God goal.
- The Netherlands won the 1988 UEFA championship.
- Hawthorn Football Club dominated Australian football, reaching seven successive VFL Grand Finals and winning the premiership in 1983, 1986, 1988, and 1989
- Liverpool F.C. were the most successful club side of the era, becoming English champions on six occasions (1980, 1982, 1983, 1984, 1986, and 1988) and winning two European Cups (1981, 1984). They also won the FA Cup in 1986, completing the first double in their history, and four consecutive League Cup titles from 1981 to 1984.
- Other highly successful club sides of the 1980s include Juventus (7 major honours won), Real Madrid (ten major honours won), Bayern Munich (nine titles won) PSV Eindhoven (four times Dutch champions and European Cup winners in 1988), and Flamengo (four times Brazilian champions, South American and International Cup winners in 1981).
- In the NFL, the San Francisco 49ers became the dynasty of the decade, winning four Super Bowls under the leadership of Joe Montana; the Chicago Bears won Super Bowl XX in January 1986, in which the team has been widely remembered for their defense; and the Washington Redskins also enjoyed success throughout the decade, winning two of their three Super Bowls under the leadership of head coach Joe Gibbs.
- Magic Johnson and Larry Bird became the two most popular NBA players during the decade while even facing against each other in three NBA Finals (1984, 1985, and 1987) continuing the storied Celtics-Lakers rivalry.
- Major League Baseball experienced parity and tense championship moments during the decade. The Philadelphia Phillies won their first World Series championship in 1980, the Kansas City Royals won their first World Series championship in a dramatic manner in 1985, the New York Mets won their second World Series championship in 1986 in a dramatic manner, and the Minnesota Twins won their first World Series in 1987. The 1988 and 1989 World Series are remembered for Kirk Gibson's home run and the Loma Prieta earthquake, respectively.
- Disc ultimate league play is introduced to Canada in 1980 by Ken Westerfield starting the first disc ultimate league (TUC), in Toronto.

=== Video gaming ===
Popular video games include Pac-Man, Super Mario Bros., Adventure, The Legend of Zelda, Final Fantasy, Dragon Warrior, Out Run, Manic Miner, Donkey Kong, Frogger, and Tetris. Pac-Man was the first game to achieve widespread popularity in mainstream culture and the first game character to be popular in his own right.

Handheld electronic LCD games was introduced into the youth market segment. The primary gaming computers of the 1980s emerged in 1982: the Commodore 64 and ZX Spectrum. Nintendo finally decided in 1985 to release its Famicom (released in 1983 in Japan) in the United States under the name Nintendo Entertainment System (NES). It was bundled with Super Mario Bros. and it suddenly became a success. The NES dominated the American and Japanese market until the rise of the next generation of consoles in the early 1990s, causing some to call this time the Nintendo era. Sega released its 16-bit console, Mega Drive/Genesis, in 1988 in Japan and in North America in 1989. In 1989, Nintendo released the Game Boy, a monochrome handheld console.

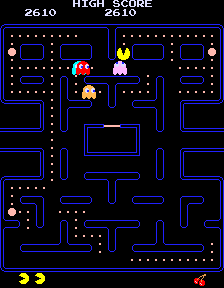
The game Pac-Man (1980) became immensely popular and an icon of 1980s popular culture

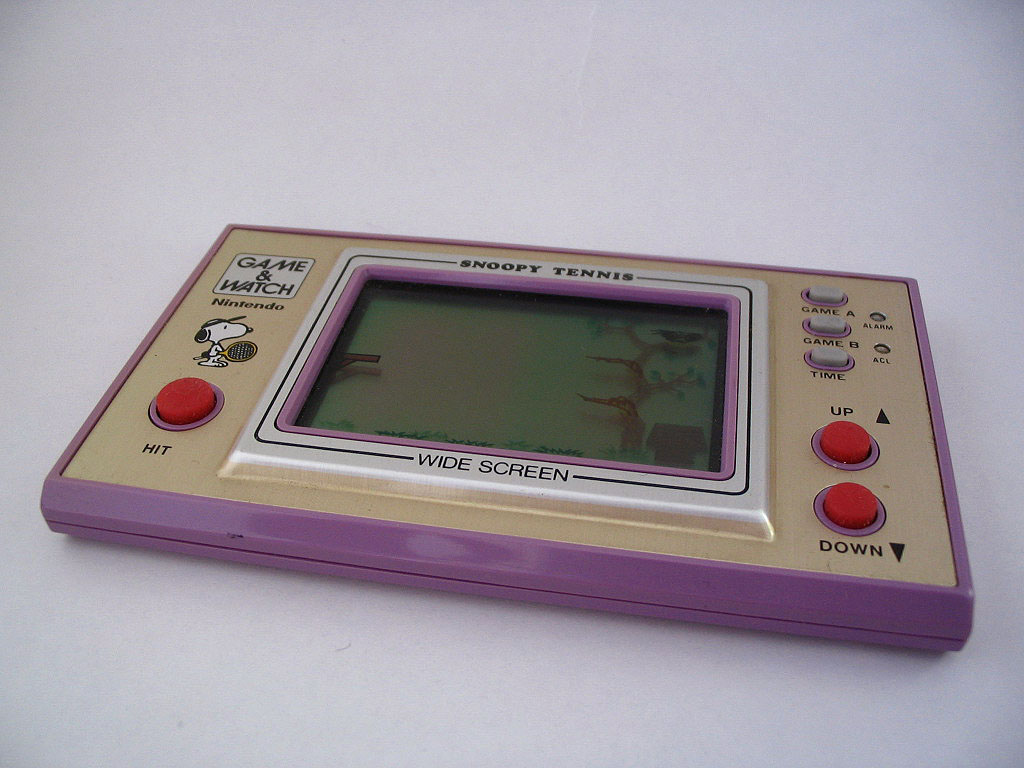
Game & Watch was the popular mobile game during the decade until it was replaced in the early 1990s with more advanced Game Boy.

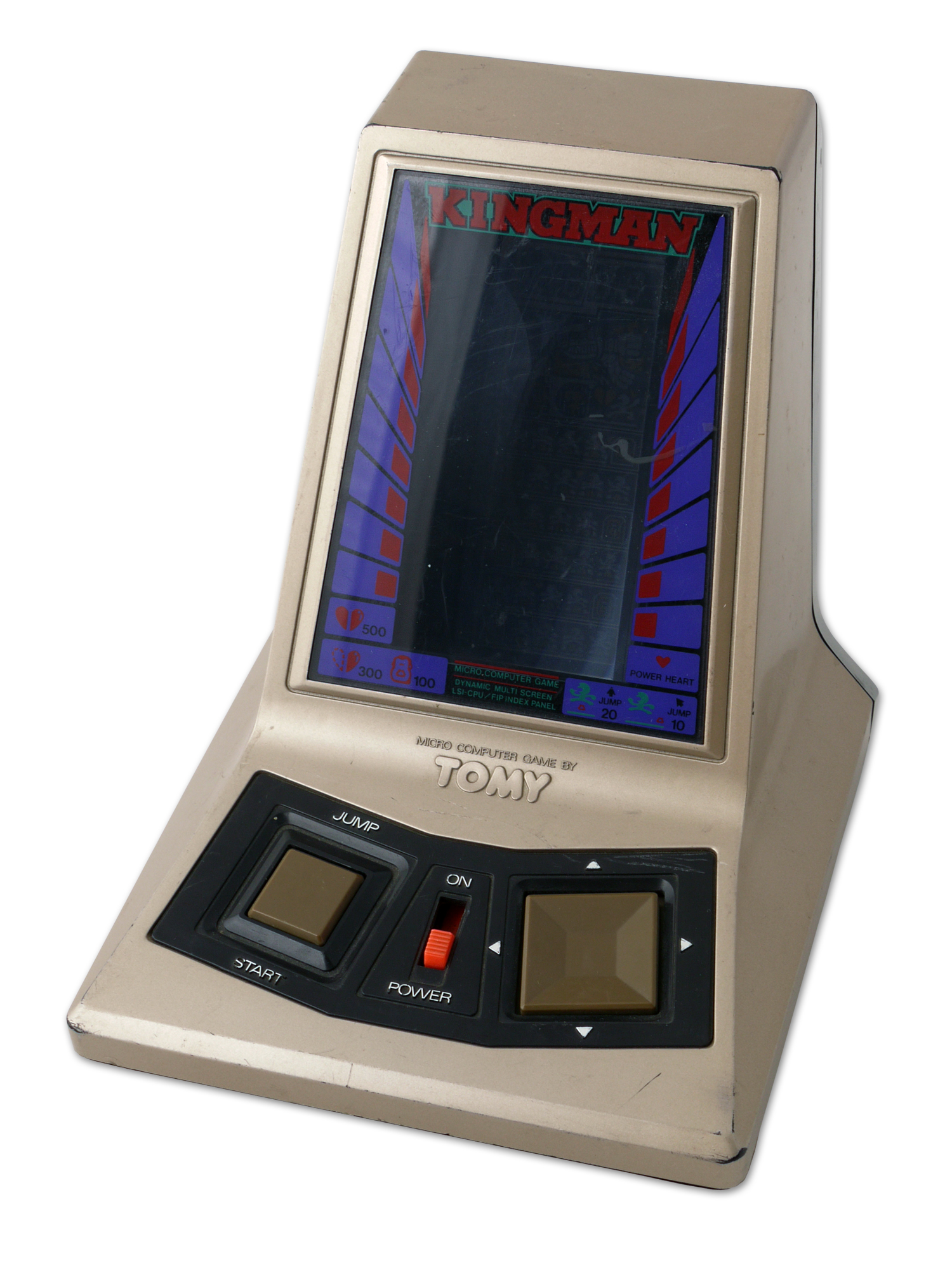
Micro computer game by Tomy

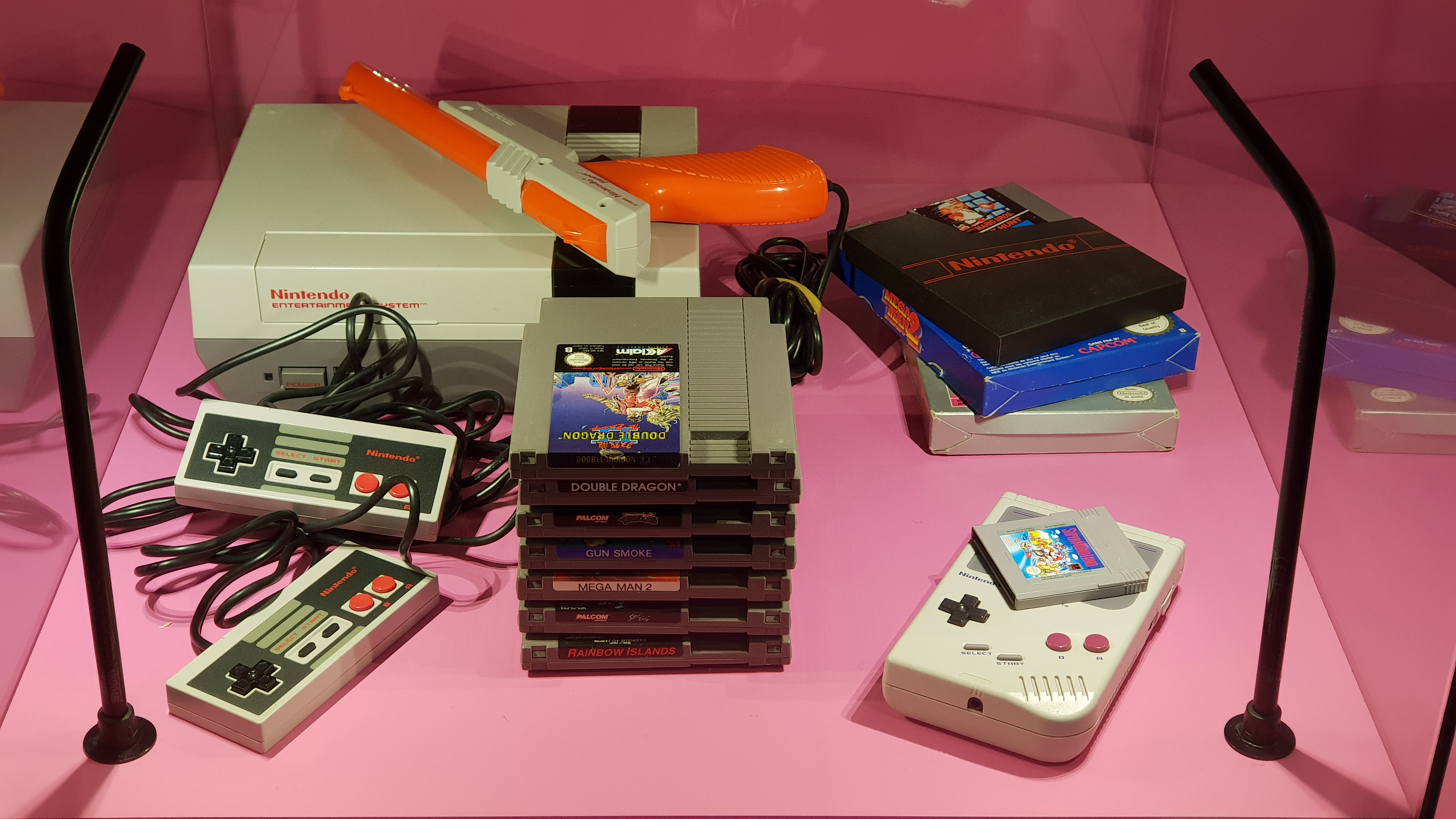
Japanese company Nintendo held a monopoly over console gaming in the United States. Pictured are the Nintendo Entertainment System and Game Boy.

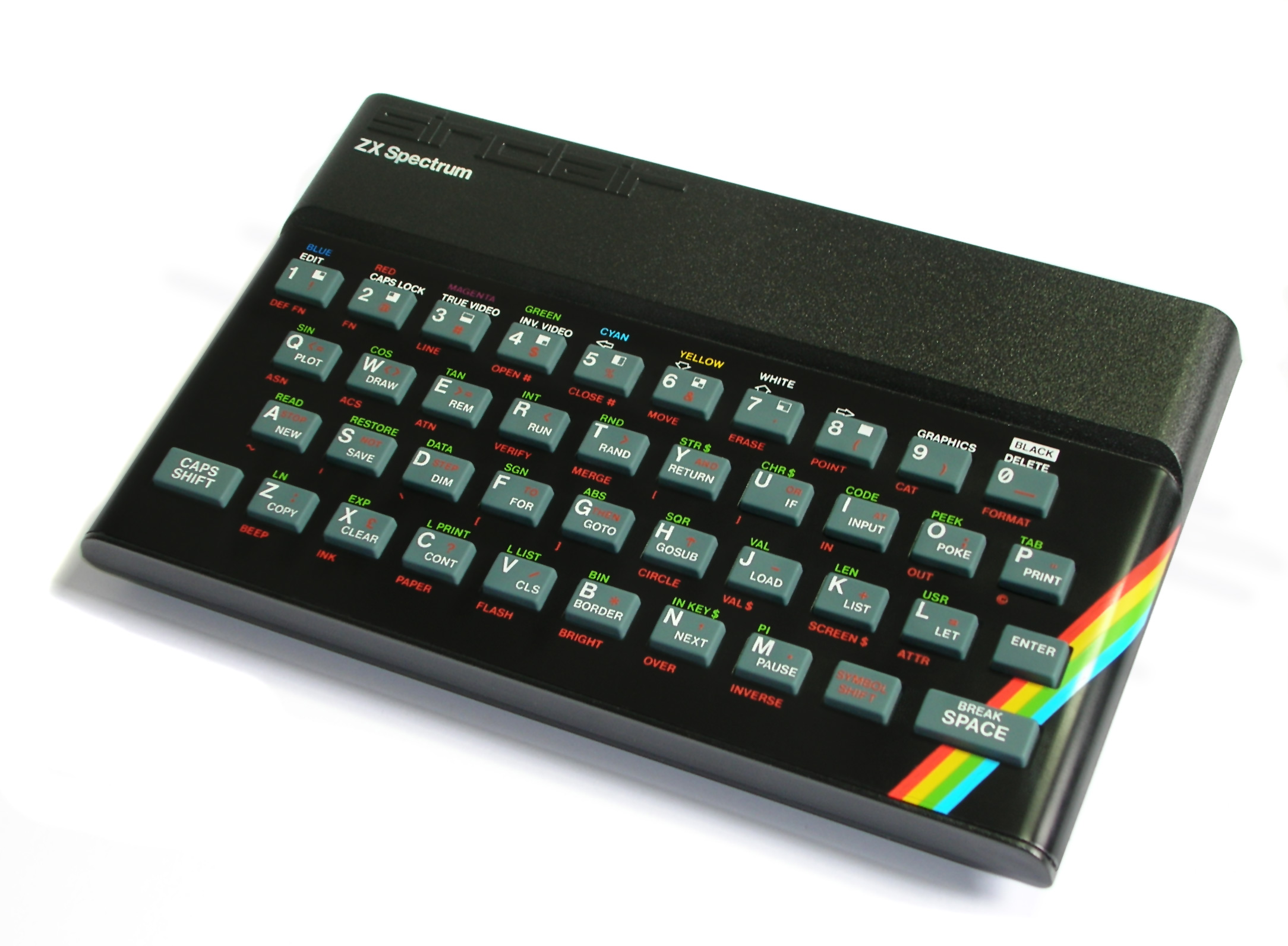
The ZX Spectrum computer was the common choice for gaming in the United Kingdom

=== Fashion ===
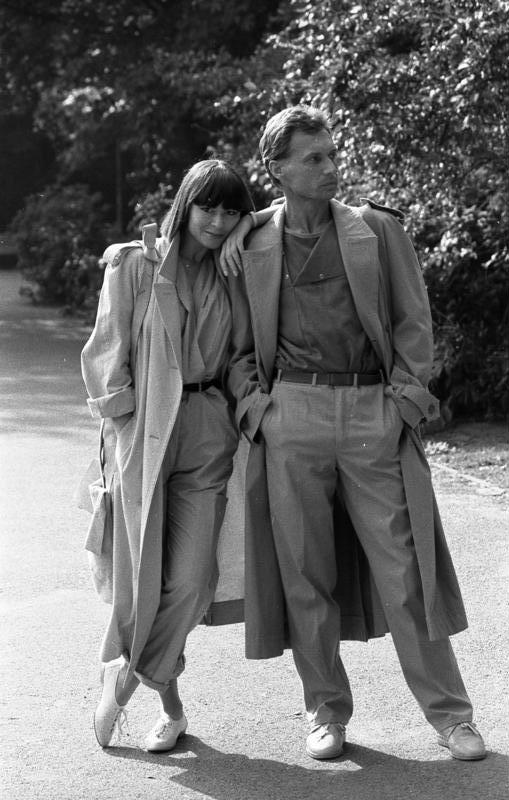
A German couple in 1985

The beginning of the decade saw the continuation of the clothing styles of the late 1970s and evolved into heavy metal fashion by the end. However, fashion became more extravagant during the 1980s. The 1980s included teased and colourfully dyed hair, ripped jeans, neon clothing and many colours and different designs which at first were not accepted.

Significant hairstyle trends of the 1980s include the perm, the mullet, the Jheri curl, big hair, the Seiko-chan cut and the hi-top fade.

Significant clothing trends of the 1980s include shoulder pads, jean jackets, leather pants, leather aviator jackets, jumpsuits, Members Only jackets, skin-tight acid-washed jeans, Izod Lacoste and "preppy" polo shirts, leggings and leg warmers (popularized in the film Flashdance), off-the-shoulder shirts, and cut sweatshirts (popularized in the same film).

Miniskirts returned to mainstream fashion in the mid-1980s after a ten-year absence, mostly made of denim material. From that point on, miniskirts and minidresses have remained in mainstream fashion to this day.

Makeup on the 1980s was aggressive, shining and colourful. Women emphasised their lips, eyebrows and cheeks with makeup. They used much blush and eyeliner.

Additional trends of the 1980s include athletic headbands, Ray-Ban Aviator sunglasses (popularized in the film Top Gun), Ray-Ban Wayfarer sunglasses (popularized in the films Risky Business and The Blues Brothers and the TV series Miami Vice) and Swatch watches. Girls and women also wore jelly shoes, large crucifix necklaces, and brassieres all inspired by Madonna's "Like a Virgin" music video.

The New Romantic movement was a British style in fashion and music influenced by futurist disco.

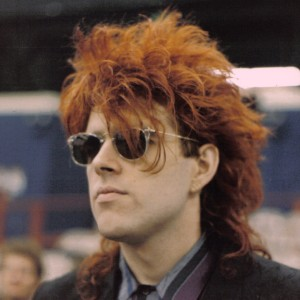
Tom Bailey of the Thompson Twins in 1986 with the trendy Big hair style achieved with liberal applications of mousse and hairspray

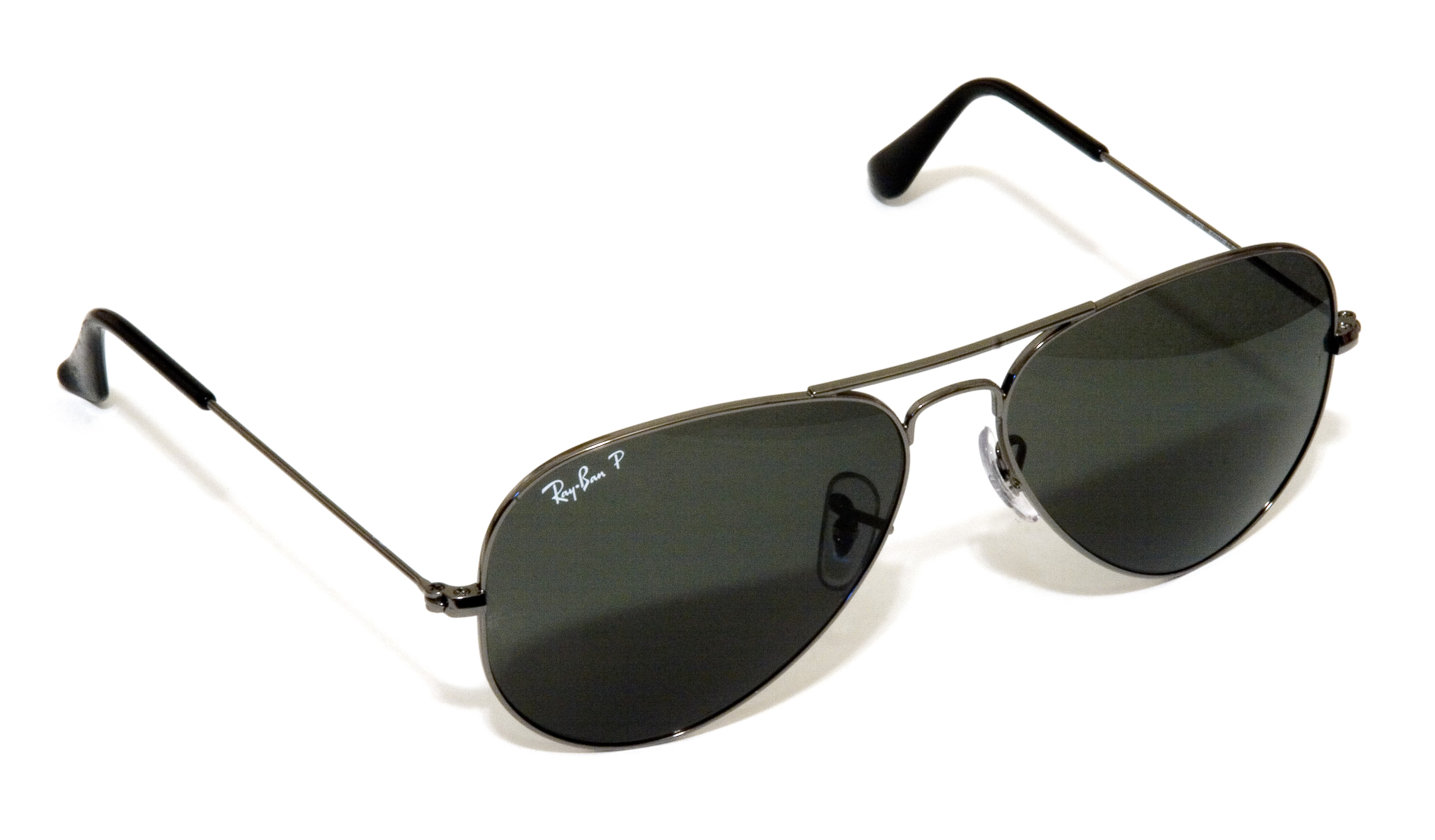
Ray-Ban sunglasses

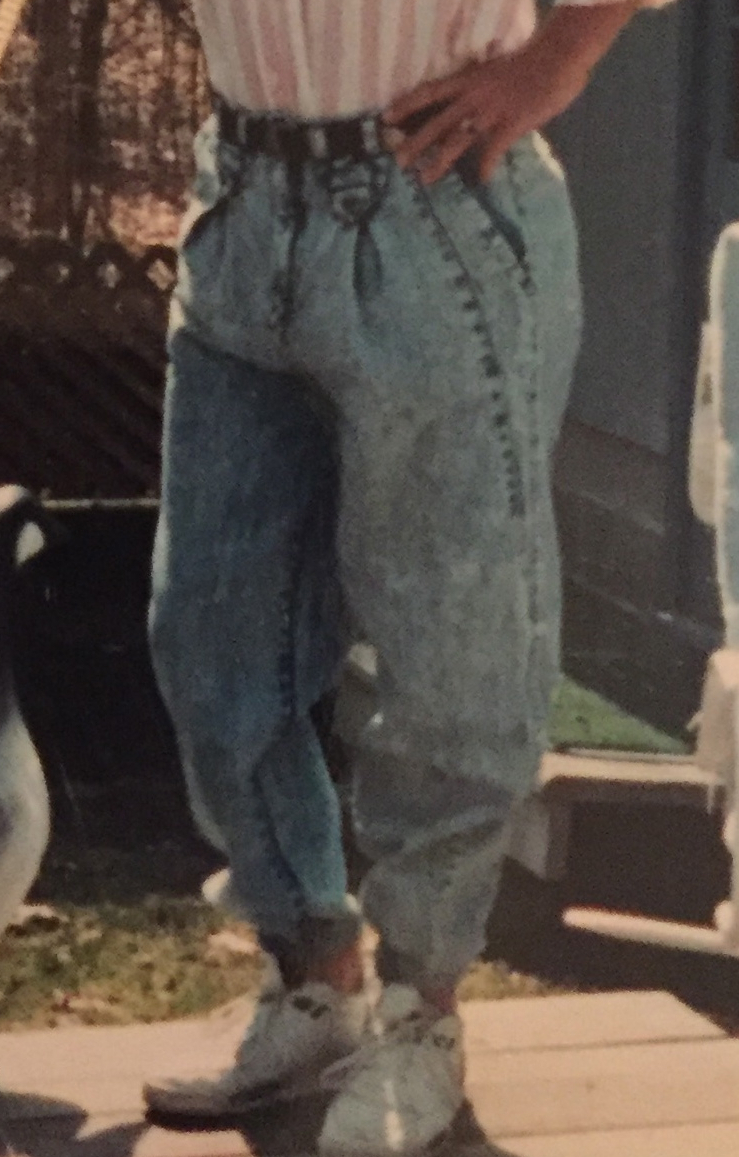
Trendy 1980s pleated acid-washed jeans

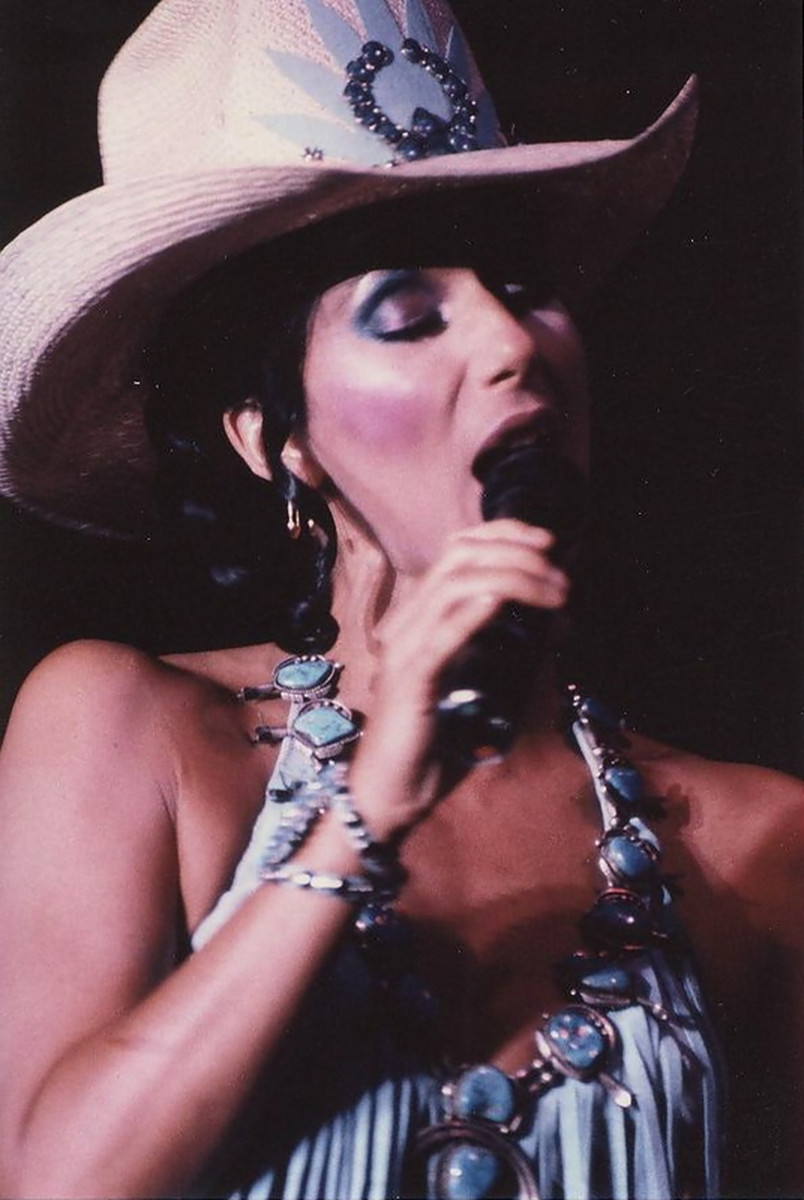
Globally popular musician and actress Cher was a prominent fashion icon of the era

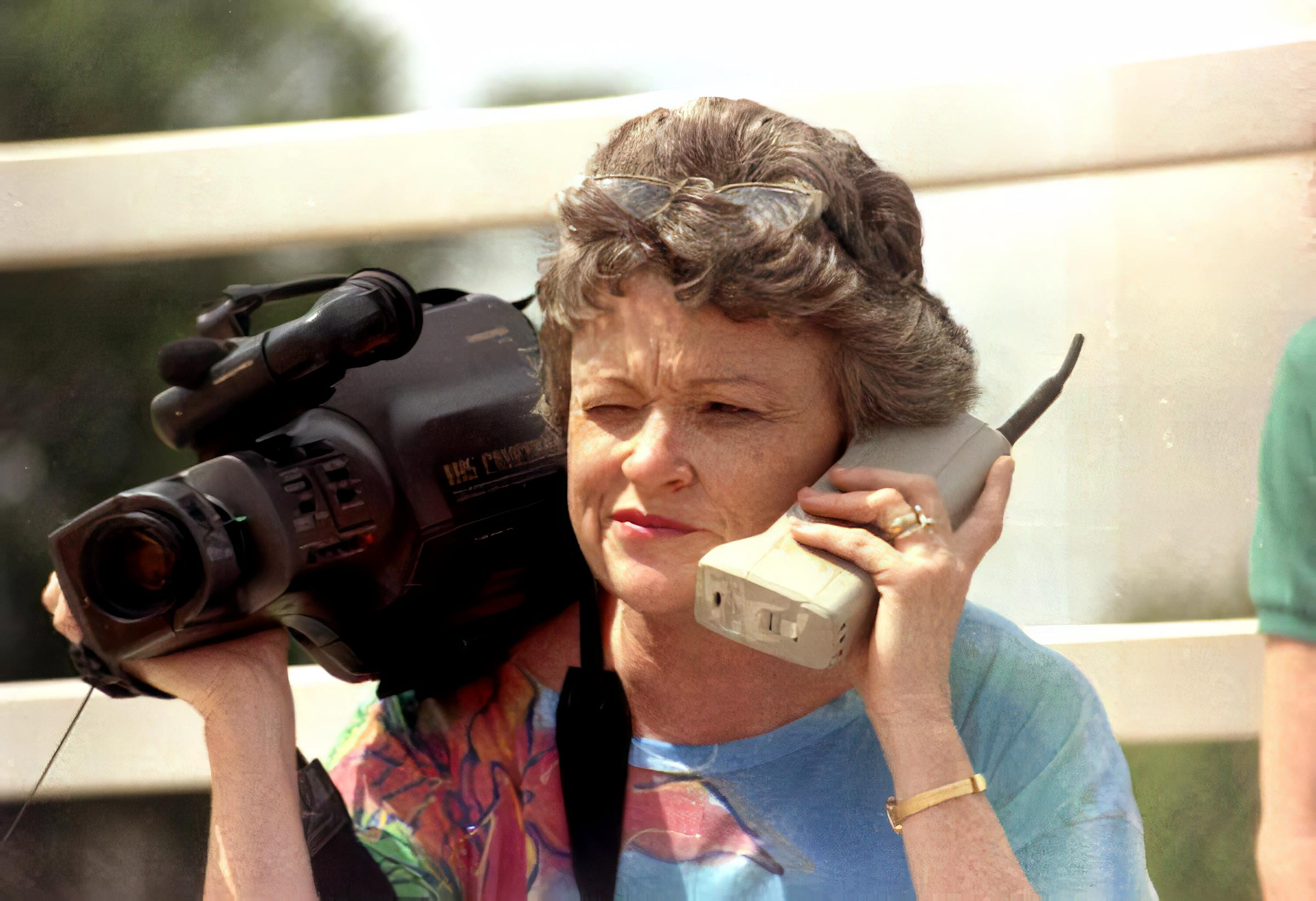
Journalist Lucy Morgan holding one of the first brick mobile phones, as well as a 1980s video camera

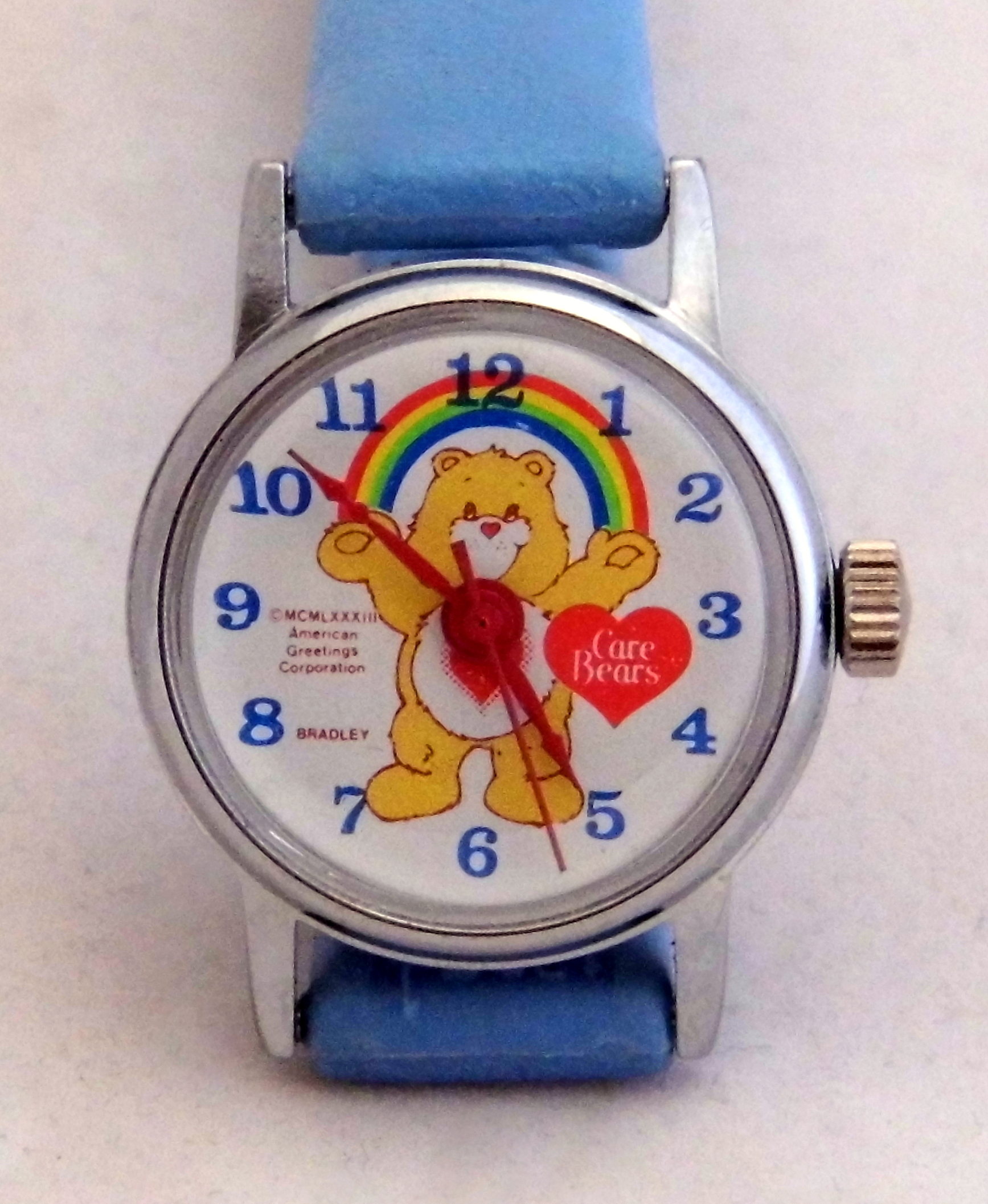
In the 1980s, Care Bears were popular for children and seen on greeting cards, clothing items, accessories and other merchandise.

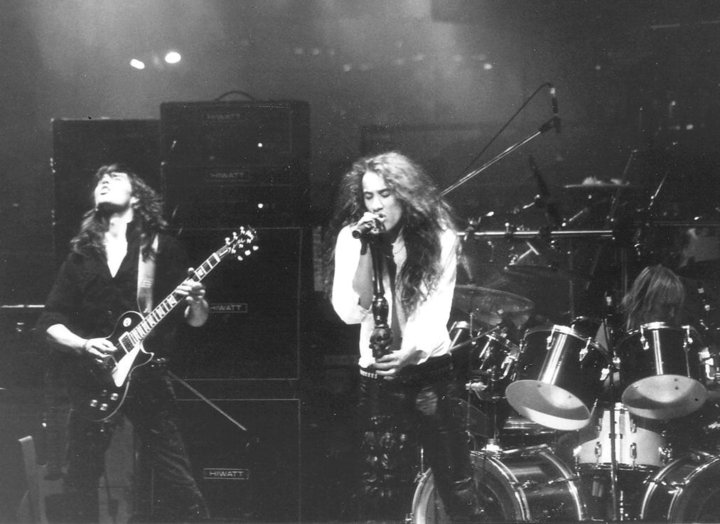
Heavy metal fashion, like this worn Mournblade, emerged in the 1980s, inspired by bands like Metallica.

=== Toys ===
The Rubik's Cube became a popular fad throughout the decade. Toys include G.I. Joe: A Real American Hero.

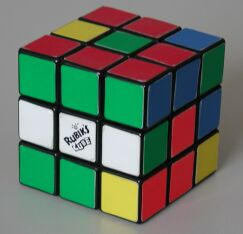
Rubik's Cube was a popular toy during the decade

=== Cultural start and end of the decade ===
Some sources claim the existence of a "long 1980s". Dates given include, for example, mid 1970s to early 1990s, 1976 to 1993 or 1994, and 1979 to 1990 or 1991 or after 2000.

The Chicago Sun-Times declared the 1977 Star Wars as the first movie of the eighties. A shift in television happened in the late 1970s as well: of the top shows considered to be "shows of the 1980s", more began 1978–1979 than began 1980–1981. 1977 also saw the introduction of ROM cartridge-based video game consoles, with the Atari Video Computer System, the Fairchild Channel F, and the Bally Astrocade, as well as seeing the introduction of the first mass-produced home computers, with the Apple II, the TRS-80, and the Commodore PET.

Some consider the 1980s to have ended with the fall of the Berlin Wall in November 1989, or with the dissolution of the Soviet Union in 1991. Reagan's last day in office 20 January 1989, marked the "end of an era". Music saw a change, with the premier of Yo! MTV Raps on 6 August 1988. On the religious front, 1988 also saw the "unraveling of the decade's conservative dominance" with the release of The Last Temptation of Christ and the three televangelist scandals of Jim Bakker, Jimmy Swaggart, and Oral Roberts. The years 1988–1993 were a cultural bridge between the politically conservative 1980s and the Internet boom of the 1990s, which began with the release of Mosaic in 1993.

== Legacy ==
There is 1980s nostalgia in Germany, Japan, the UK, the US and elsewhere.

== See also ==
- List of decades, centuries, and millennia
- 1980s in fashion
- 1980s in music
- 1980s in television
- 1980s in video gaming
- 1980s literature
- Hairstyles in the 1980s

=== Timeline ===
The following articles contain timelines for each year of the decade:

1980 • 1981 • 1982 • 1983 • 1984 • 1985 • 1986 • 1987 • 1988 • 1989
