= Delta Air Lines Flight 191 =

1985 aviation accident in Texas

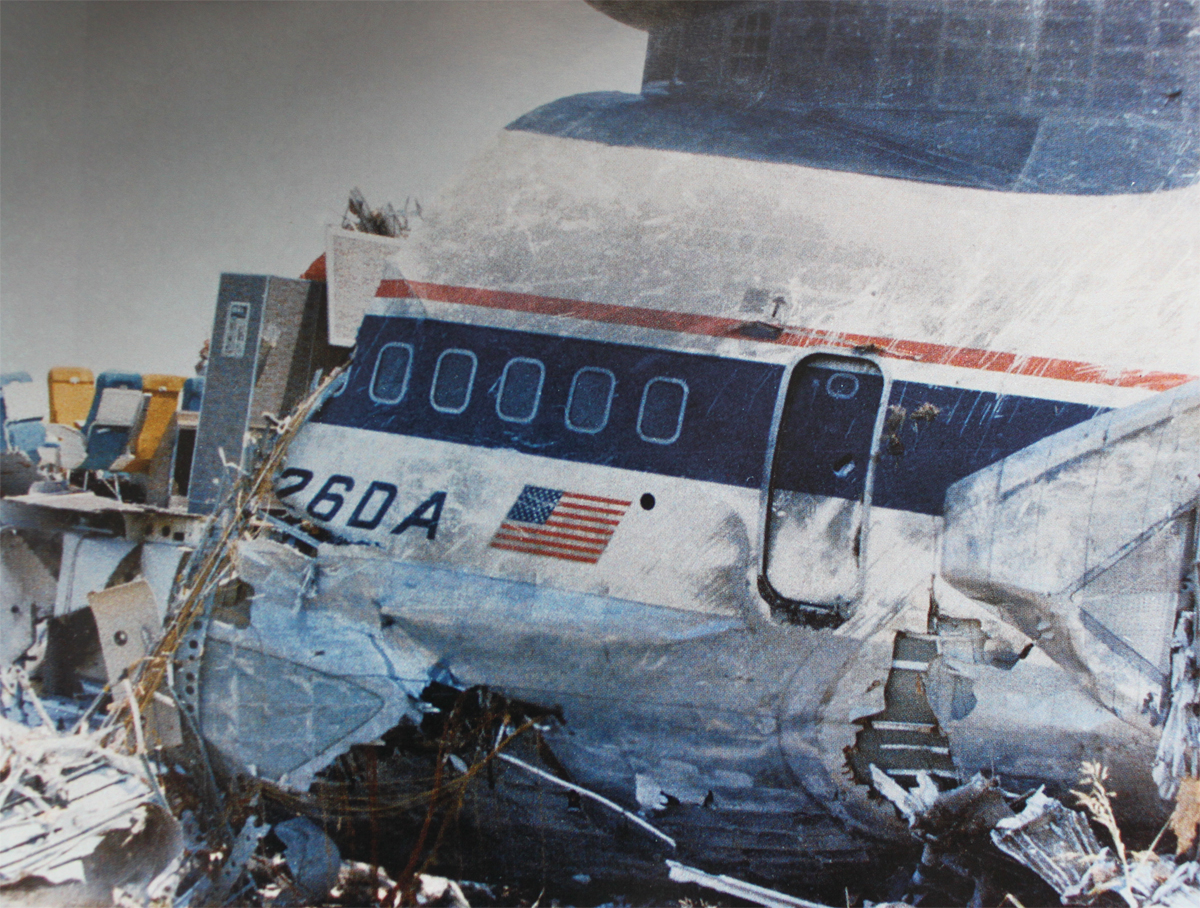
- A close-up view of the tail section wreckage

Accident
- Date: August 2, 1985
- Summary: Crashed on approach following loss of control due to microburst induced windshear and decision to fly into severe thunderstorm
- Site: Dallas/Fort Worth International Airport, Irving, Texas, United States; 32°55′06″N 097°01′25″W
- Total fatalities: 137 (Note: The crash of Flight 191 ultimately killed 137 people, including 136 people aboard the aircraft and one person on the ground. This total includes two passengers who initially survived the crash, but later died as a result of their injuries. On October 4, 1985, a burned passenger who also suffered dual leg amputations died more than two months after the crash, marking the 137th and last fatality from the crash. Although media reports reflected a total of 137 fatalities as a result of the crash, the NTSB's final report only identified 135 "fatal" injuries. In its final report, the NTSB explained that federal regulations define "fatal injury" as an injury that results in death within 30 days of an accident. Thus, the NTSB was required by regulation to report the last two passengers to die from their injuries as "survivors" because they did not pass away in at most 30 days after the accident.)
- Total injuries: 26

Aircraft
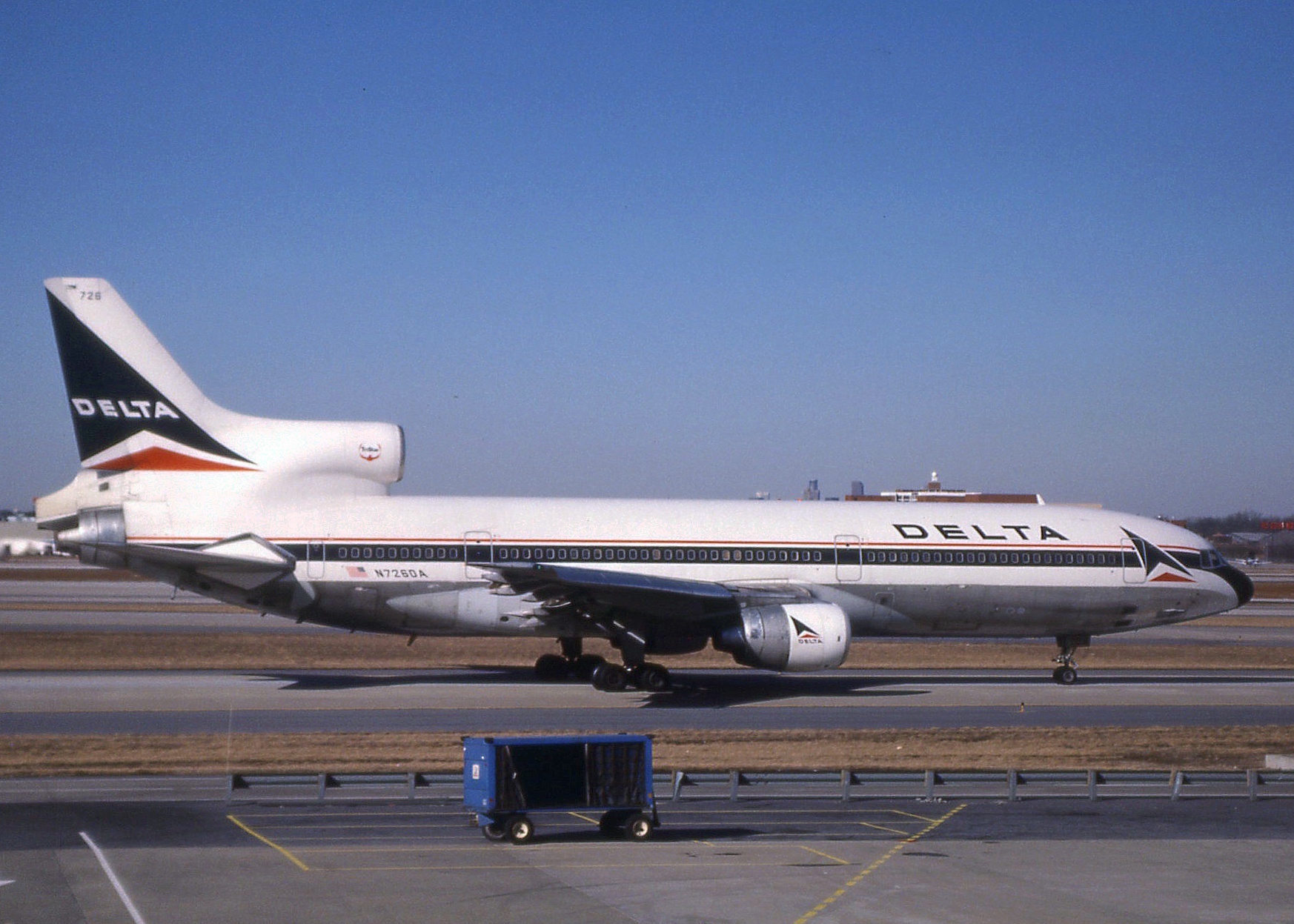
- N726DA, the aircraft involved in the accident, pictured in February 1985
- Aircraft type: Lockheed L-1011-385-1 TriStar
- Operator: Delta Air Lines
- IATA flight No.: DL191
- ICAO flight No.: DAL191
- Call sign: DELTA 191
- Registration: N726DA
- Flight origin: Fort Lauderdale–Hollywood International Airport
- Stopover: Dallas/Fort Worth International Airport
- Destination: Los Angeles International Airport
- Occupants: 163
- Passengers: 152
- Crew: 11
- Fatalities: 136
- Injuries: 25
- Survivors: 27 (Note: The NTSB officially listed 29 survivors in its final report but also noted that it was aware that 2 of the 29 identified survivors had died from their injuries. The NTSB explained that it was required by federal regulation to list these 2 deceased passengers as survivors because their deaths occurred more than 30 days after the crash.)

Ground casualties
- Ground fatalities: 1
- Ground injuries: 1

Delta Air Lines Flight 191 was a regularly scheduled Delta Air Lines domestic flight from Fort Lauderdale, Florida, to Los Angeles, California, with an intermediate stop at Dallas/Fort Worth International Airport (DFW). On August 2, 1985, the Lockheed L-1011 TriStar operating Flight 191 encountered a strong microburst while on approach to land at DFW. The aircraft impacted ground just over one mile (1.6 km) short of the runway, struck a car near the airport, collided with two water tanks and disintegrated. Out of the 163 occupants on board, 136 people died and 25 others were injured in the accident, while the driver of the car struck by the aircraft also died.

The National Transportation Safety Board (NTSB) determined that the crash resulted from the flight crew's decision to fly through a thunderstorm, the lack of procedures or training to avoid or escape microbursts and the lack of hazard information on wind shear. Forecasts of microbursts improved in the following years, with the 1994 crash of USAir Flight 1016 being the only subsequent microburst-induced crash of a commercial, fixed-wing aircraft in the United States as of 2026.

== Background ==
=== Aircraft ===
The accident aircraft was a Lockheed L-1011-385-1 TriStar (registration number N726DA). It was delivered to Delta Air Lines on February 28, 1979, and had operated continuously until the accident. Three Rolls-Royce RB211-22B engines powered the aircraft.

=== Crew members ===
The crew consisted of three flight crew members and eight cabin crew members. Of the 11 crew members, only 3 flight attendants survived.

In command of Flight 191 was Captain Edward Michael "Ted" Connors Jr., aged 57, who had been a Delta employee since 1954. He qualified to captain the TriStar in 1979 and had passed his proficiency checks. The National Transportation Safety Board (NTSB) mentioned in its final report that past flight crews who had flown with Connors described him as a meticulous pilot who strictly adhered to company policies. The report also stated that Connors "deviated around thunderstorms even if other flights took more direct routes" and "willingly accepted suggestions from his flight crew." Since his qualification in 1979, Connors had passed all eight en route inspections that he had undergone; the NTSB report also noted that he had received "favorable comments" regarding "cockpit discipline and standardization." Connors had logged over 29,300 hours of flight time, 3,000 of them in the TriStar.

First Officer Rudolph Przydzial "Rudy" Price Jr., age 42, had been a Delta employee since 1970. Delta captains who flew with Price described him as an "above average first officer" who possessed "excellent knowledge" of the TriStar. Price had logged 6,500 flight hours, including 1,200 in the TriStar. Flight Engineer Nicholas Nestor "Nick" Nassick, age 43, had been a Delta employee since 1976. He had logged 6,500 hours of flight time, including 4,500 in the TriStar. Fellow Delta employees described Nassick as "observant, alert, and professional."

Connors had served with the United States Navy from 1950 to 1954 and fought during two tours in the Korean War. Price had served with the United States Navy from 1964 to 1970 and fought in four tours in the Vietnam War. Nassick had served with the United States Air Force from 1963 to 1976 and had fought in four tours during the Vietnam War.

=== Passengers ===
Of the 152 passengers, 128 were killed in the crash. Twelve of the twenty-four survivors were seated in a cluster near the aircraft's tail. The NTSB report lists 126 passenger fatalities rather than 128, but notes that two of the passengers listed as survivors died more than thirty days after the crash, on September 13 and October 4, 1985. Of the dead, seventy-three originated from the Miami metropolitan area; forty-five were from Broward County, nineteen were from Palm Beach County and nine were from Dade County.

Among the deaths was Don Estridge, known to the world as the father of the IBM PC; he died aboard the flight along with his wife Mary Ann. Two IBM summer interns, four IBM employees from the IBM branch office in Burbank, California, and six additional family members of IBM employees also perished.

== Accident ==
=== History ===
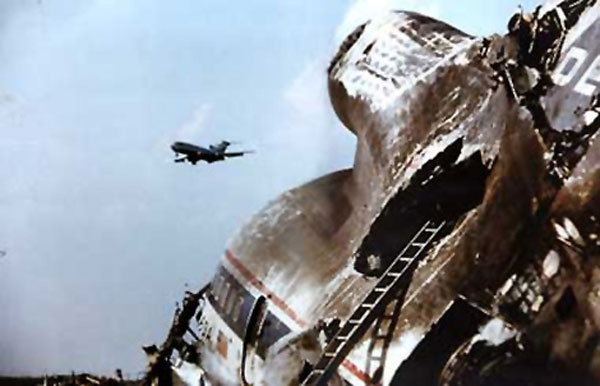
Another view of the remains of N726DA, as a Boeing 727 approaches to land.

Flight 191 was a regularly scheduled passenger flight from Fort Lauderdale–Hollywood International Airport to Los Angeles International Airport, with a scheduled stop at Dallas–Fort Worth International Airport (DFW). The flight departed Fort Lauderdale on an instrument flight rules flight plan at 14:10 Central Daylight Time (UTC−05:00). (Note: The NTSB report describes Flight 191 as departing Fort Lauderdale at 15:10 Eastern Daylight Time (UTC−04:00). All other times given in the NTSB report are in Central Daylight Time (UTC−05:00). For consistency and ease of reading, all times in this article are in Central Daylight Time.) The flight's dispatch weather forecast for DFW stated a "possibility of widely scattered rain showers and thunderstorms." Another dispatch weather alert warned of "an area of isolated thunderstorms ... over Oklahoma and northern and northeastern Texas." The flight crew reviewed these notices before takeoff.

As the aircraft flew past New Orleans, Louisiana, a weather formation near the Gulf Coast strengthened. The flight crew decided to deviate from the intended route to make the more northerly Blue Ridge arrival to DFW. The flight held for ten to fifteen minutes over the Texarkana VORTAC. At 17:35, the crew received an Automatic Terminal Information Service (ATIS) broadcast for weather on approach to DFW, and the Fort Worth Air Route Traffic Control Center (ARTCC) air traffic controller cleared the flight to the Blue Ridge VORTAC and instructed the flight to descend to 25,000 feet (7,600 m).

At 17:43:45, the Fort Worth ARTCC controller cleared the flight down to 10,000 feet (3,000 m). The controller suggested they fly a heading of 250° toward the Blue Ridge approach, but Connors replied that the route would take them through a storm cell, stating, "I'd rather not go through it, I'd rather go around it one way or the other." After a brief exchange, the controller gave the flight a new heading. At 17:46:50, the controller cleared the flight direct to Blue Ridge and instructed the crew to descend to 9,000 feet (2,700 m). Connors expressed his relief that the controller did not send them on the original trajectory. At 17:51:19, Nassick commented, "Looks like it's raining over Fort Worth." At 17:51:42, the Fort Worth ARTCC controller transferred the flight to DFW Airport Approach Control, which cleared the flight to descend to 7,000 feet (2,100 m). Two minutes later, the controller asked Flight 191 to deviate by 10° and to slow their airspeed to 180 knots (210 mph; 330 km/h). The crew acknowledged the request. As the flight descended, the crew prepared the aircraft for landing. At 17:56:19, the feeder controller cleared the flight down to 5,000 feet (1,500 m). Nine seconds later, the controller announced that rain was north of the airport, and that the airport would be using instrument landing system (ILS) approaches.

At 17:59:47, Price said, "We're gonna get our airplane washed." Around the same time, Connors switched to the arrival radio frequency and informed the approach controller that they were flying at 5,000 feet (1,500 m). The controller replied that the flight should expect to approach Runway 17L (now 17C). At 18:00:36, the approach controller asked an American Airlines flight that was two aircraft ahead of Flight 191, and on the same approach, if they could see the airport. The American Airlines flight responded, "As soon as we break out of this rain shower, we will." At 18:00:51, Flight 191 was instructed to slow to 170 knots (200 mph; 310 km/h) and to turn to heading 270°. Flight 191 was instructed to descend to 3,000 feet (910 m) at 18:01:34. One minute later, the approach controller turned the flight toward Runway 17L and cleared them for an ILS approach at or above 2,300 feet (700 m). Half a minute afterward, the controller asked the flight to reduce their speed to 160 knots (180 mph; 300 km/h), which the crew acknowledged. At 18:03:30 the controller advised, "And we're getting some variable winds out there due to a shower ... out there north end of DFW." Several seconds later, an unidentified flight crew member commented, "Stuff is moving in."

Just three miles (5 km) ahead of Flight 191, a Learjet 25 was on the same approach to Runway 17L. While on final approach, the Learjet flew through the storm north of the airport and encountered what was later described as "light to moderate turbulence". The Learjet encountered heavy rain and lost all forward visibility, but was able to continue its ILS approach and land safely. When later asked why he did not report weather conditions to the tower, the Learjet's captain testified that he had nothing to report because "the only thing that we encountered was the heavy rain." The tower controller handling landings on Runway 17L saw lightning from the storm cell after the Learjet landed, but before he saw Flight 191 emerge from the storm.

=== Crash ===
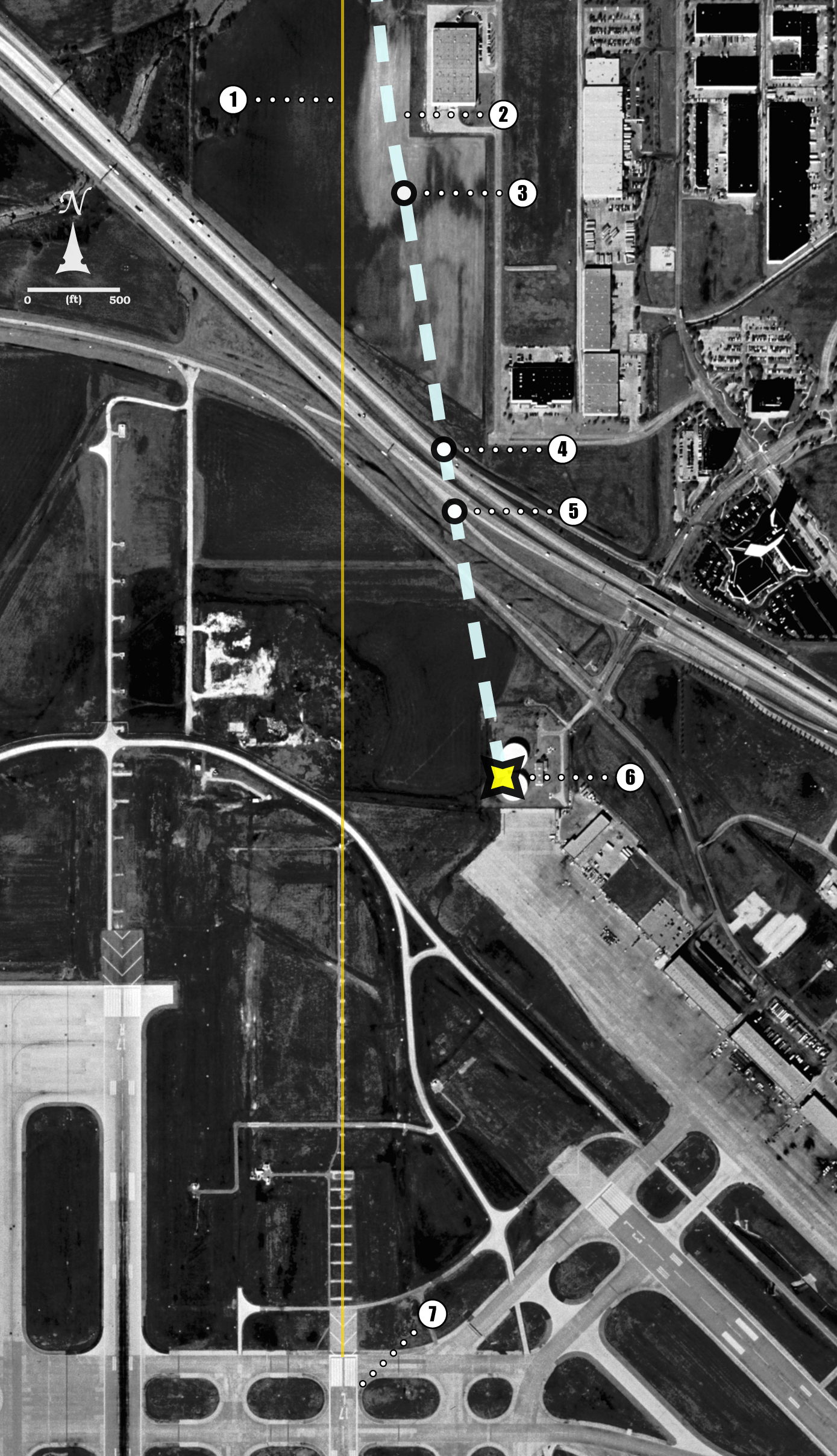
The flight path in the final moments. William Mayberry is killed in his car at "4".

At 18:03:46, the approach controller once again asked Flight 191 to reduce its speed, this time to 150 knots (280 km/h; 170 mph), and then handed the flight over to the tower controller. Twelve seconds later, Connors radioed the tower and said, "Tower[:] Delta one ninety one heavy, out here in the rain, feels good." The tower controller advised Flight 191 that the wind was blowing at 5 knots (5.8 mph; 2.6 m/s) with gusts up to 15 knots (17 mph; 7.7 m/s), which the captain acknowledged. The flight crew lowered the landing gear and extended their flaps for landing. At 18:04:18, Price commented, "Lightning coming out of that one. ... Right ahead of us." Connors called out that they were at 1,000 feet (300 m) at 18:05:05. Fourteen seconds later, he cautioned Price to watch his airspeed. At the same time, the cockpit voice recorder (CVR) captured the beginning of a sound identified as rain hitting the cockpit. Connors warned Price, "You're gonna lose it all of a sudden, there it is." At 18:05:26, Connors told Price, "Push it up, push it way up." Several seconds later, the CVR recorded the sound of the engines spooling up. Connors then said, "That's it." At 18:05:36, Connors exclaimed, "Hang on to the son of a bitch!" From this point, the aircraft began a descent from which it never recovered. The angle of attack (AOA) was over 30° and began to vary wildly over the next few seconds. The pitch angle began to sink and the aircraft started descending below the glideslope.

At 18:05:44, with the aircraft descending at more than 3,000 feet per minute (15 m/s; 34 mph) the ground proximity warning system (GPWS) sounded. The captain responded by declaring "TOGA", aviation shorthand for the order to apply maximum thrust and abort a landing by going around. The first officer responded by pulling up and raising the nose of the aircraft, which slowed but did not stop the plane's descent. At 18:05:52, still descending at a rate around 600 feet per minute (3.0 m/s; 6.8 mph), the aircraft's landing gear made contact with a plowed field 6,336 feet (1,931 m) north of the runway and 360 feet (110 m) east of the runway centerline. Remaining structurally intact, Flight 191 remained on the ground while rolling at high speed across the farmland. The main landing gear left shallow depressions in the field that extended for 240 feet (73 m) before disappearing and reappearing a few times as the aircraft approached Texas State Highway 114.

The aircraft struck a highway street light, and its nose gear touched down on the westbound lane of Highway 114, skidding across the road at at least 200 miles per hour (170 kn; 320 km/h). The aircraft's left engine hit a 1971 Toyota Celica driven by 28-year-old William Mayberry, killing him instantly. As the aircraft continued south, it hit two more street lights on the eastbound side of the highway and began fragmenting. The left horizontal stabilizer, some engine pieces, portions of the wing control surfaces and parts of the nose gear came off the aircraft as it continued along the ground. Some witnesses later testified that fire was emerging from the left wing root. Surviving passengers reported that fire began entering the cabin through the left wall while the plane was still moving. One survivor stated that he watched passengers attempt to escape the fire by unbuckling their seatbelts and trying to flee, but they were sucked out of the plane, while others who stayed caught on fire due to leaking jet fuel. He only survived due to being doused by rain from openings in the plane. The aircraft's motion across open land ended when it crashed into two water tanks on the edge of the airport property; the aircraft grazed one water tank about 1,700 feet (520 m) south of Highway 114, and then struck the second one. As the left-wing and nose struck the water tank, the fuselage rotated counterclockwise and was engulfed in a fireball. The fuselage from the nose rearward to row 34 was destroyed. The tail section emerged from the fireball, skidded backward, and came to rest on its left side before wind gusts rotated it upright.

== Post-crash response ==
Diagram of the injuries suffered in the cabin

All airport fire and emergency units were alerted within one minute of the crash. Forty-five seconds after first being alerted, three fire trucks from the airport's fire station No. 3 arrived at the crash and began fighting the fire. Additional units from fire stations No. 1 and No. 2 arrived within five minutes, and despite high wind gusts and heavy rain, the fire was mostly under control within 10 minutes after the alert was sounded.

The first paramedics arrived within five minutes of the crash and immediately established triage stations. In later testimony to NTSB officials, on-site EMTs estimated that without the on-scene triage procedures, at least half of the surviving passengers would have died. Most of the survivors of Flight 191 were located in the aircraft's rear smoking section, which broke free from the main fuselage when the aircraft hit the water tanks. Authorities transported most of the survivors to Parkland Memorial Hospital.

The cockpit and passenger section forward of seat row 34 had been completely fragmented by impact with the water tanks and post-crash fires; all but eight of the occupants in this section were killed. The remainder of the surviving passengers and crew were in the rear cabin and tail section, which separated relatively intact and landed on its side in an open field, and most of these were in the center and right portions of the fuselage from seat row 40 rearwards. (Note: The left sidewall of the aft fuselage was destroyed during the impact sequence, and the fuselage structure between rows 34 and 40 was extensively disrupted when the tail section separated from the aircraft. Of the fifteen passengers and crew seated in the separated portion of the aft cabin forward of row 40, eleven were killed, three passengers received serious injuries, and one flight attendant suffered minor injuries. From row 40 rearwards, only six fatalities occurred, all of them passengers seated along the destroyed left wall; two occupants on the left side of the aft fuselage survived with serious injuries, while all of the fourteen passengers and flight attendants in the center and right portions of the cabin aft of row 40 survived, eleven of them with no or minor injuries.) Overall, the disintegration of the Tristar was so extensive that the NTSB investigation was quite difficult. Survivors reported that fire broke out in the cabin prior to hitting the tanks and began spreading through the aircraft's interior, which is consistent with the right wing's collision with the light pole and fuel tank ignition. Some of the people in the tail section were unable to free themselves due to injuries, so rescue crews had to extricate them. Most survivors were also soaked with jet fuel, further adding to the difficulty of exiting the wreckage.

Two of the passengers who initially survived the crash died more than 30 days later. On the ground, an airline employee who assisted in rescuing survivors was hospitalized overnight for chest and arm pain. The crash ultimately killed 137 people, including 128 of the 152 passengers, 8 of the 11 crew (including all three flight crew members), and the driver of the car.

Delta Air Lines Flight 191 has the second-highest death toll of any aviation accident involving a Lockheed L-1011 anywhere in the world, after Saudia Flight 163, which killed 301.

== Investigation ==
Numerous public safety agencies responded to the crash, including the Dallas/Fort Worth Airport Department of Public Safety, the Texas Department of Public Safety, the Irving Fire Department, the Irving Police Department, and all available third-watch personnel from the Dallas Police Department's Northwest Patrol Division and the Northeastern Sector of the Fort Worth Police Department's Patrol Division.

After a long investigation, the NTSB deemed the cause of the crash to be attributable to pilot error (for their decision to fly through a thunderstorm), combined with extreme weather phenomena associated with microburst-induced wind shear. The NTSB also determined that a lack of specific training, policies, and procedures for avoiding and escaping low-altitude wind shear was a contributing factor.

The NTSB attributed the accident to lack of the ability to detect microbursts aboard aircraft; the radar equipment aboard aircraft at the time was unable to detect wind changes, only thunderstorms. After the investigation, NASA researchers at Langley Research Center modified a Boeing 737-100 as a testbed for an onboard Doppler weather radar. The resultant airborne wind shear detection and alert system was installed on many commercial airliners in the United States after the Federal Aviation Administration mandated that all commercial aircraft must have on-board wind shear-detection systems.

The NTSB was also critical of the airport for failing to notify emergency services in surrounding municipalities in a timely manner. While the airport's on-site emergency services were notified almost immediately, the DFW Department of Public Safety (DPS) Communications Center did not begin notifying off-site emergency services until nearly 10 minutes after the crash and did not finish its notifications until 45 minutes after the crash. During notifications, DPS also failed to request ambulances from the adjacent communities of Irving, Grapevine, and Hurst; however, Hurst responded with ambulances after personnel at its ambulance company overheard the airport crash report on a radio-frequency scanner. The NTSB concluded that the overall emergency response was effective due to the rapid response of on-airport personnel, but found "several problem areas" which under different circumstances "could affect adversely the medical treatment and survival of accident victims at the airport".

== Legacy ==
=== Reforms ===
Following the crash and the ensuing NTSB report, DFW's DPS made improvements to its postcrash notification system, including the introduction of an automated voice notification system to reduce notification times. In 1988, following the crash of Delta Air Lines Flight 1141 while taking off from DFW, DPS completed its notification of nearby emergency services in 21 minutes; the NTSB described this as a "significant improvement" over response times after the Delta Flight 191 crash. Based on the improved response times, the NTSB issued a Safety Recommendation on January 9, 1990, calling for airport executives nationwide to consider the benefits of using automated voice notification systems for their emergency aid notifications. Pilots were also required to train to react to microbursts and to quickly take evasive action in order to safely land the plane.

=== Trial ===
The Delta Flight 191 crash resulted in the longest aviation trial in American history, lasting 14 months from 1988 to 1989 and presided over by Federal Judge David Owen Belew Jr. of the Northern District of Texas. The trial featured the first use of computer graphic animation as substantive evidence in federal court. While the use of such animation later became routine, its use in the Flight 191 litigation was sufficiently novel that it became the cover story of the December 1989 ABA Journal, the magazine of the American Bar Association. Preparing the animated video for trial cost the Department of Justice around $100,000 to $150,000 (inflation adjusted $260,000 to $390,000), and required nearly two years of work. The court found that both government personnel and the Delta flight crew were negligent, but that Delta was ultimately responsible because its pilots' negligence was the proximate cause of the accident, and the ruling was upheld on appeal to the Fifth Circuit Court of Appeals.

== Dramatization and media ==
The crash was the subject of the television movie Fire and Rain.

The Discovery Channel Canada/National Geographic television series Mayday dramatized the crash of Flight 191 in a season-five episode titled "Invisible Killer". The crash had previously been discussed in the Mayday season-one episode "Racing the Storm", which covered the weather-related crash landing of American Airlines Flight 1420.

The crash was featured on an episode of When Weather Changed History and Why Planes Crash on The Weather Channel, and the episode "Deadly Weather" of Survival in the Sky on The Learning Channel.

The crash was mentioned in the feature film Rain Man.

Working as a reporter for the Fort Lauderdale News and Sun-Sentinel in 1986, future crime fiction author Michael Connelly and two other reporters conducted extensive interviews of survivors of Delta Flight 191 and wrote an article detailing their experiences during and after the crash. The article explored the topic of survivor guilt and earned Connelly and his co-writers a finalist position for the Pulitzer Prize.

== Memorial ==
Ten years after the crash, survivors and family members of victims gathered in Florida to recognize the tenth anniversary of the accident. In 2010, 25 years after the accident, a memorial was installed at Dallas-Fort Worth International Airport's Founders Plaza in Grapevine.

== See also ==
- Aviation safety
- Turkish Airlines Flight 1951
- Bhoja Air Flight 213
- Eastern Air Lines Flight 66
- Pan Am Flight 759
- Pan Am Flight 806
- USAir Flight 1016
- Martinair Flight 495
- 1956 Kano Airport BOAC Argonaut crash
- Aeroméxico Connect Flight 2431
- 1950 Air France multiple Douglas DC-4 accidents
- China Airlines Flight 642
- Japan Air Lines Flight 123, another aviation accident that occurred 10 days after
