= USAir Flight 1016 =

1994 aviation accident in North Carolina

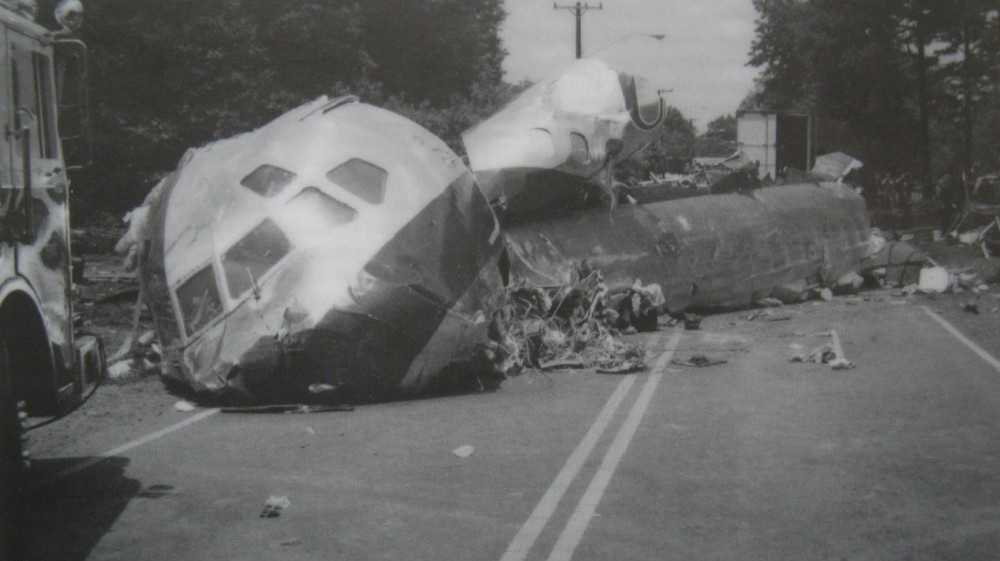
- Wreckage of the aircraft's cockpit section

Accident
- Date: July 2, 1994
- Summary: Crashed on approach due to microburst induced windshear and spatial disorientation; Pilot Error
- Site: Near Charlotte/Douglas International Airport, Charlotte, United States; 35°13′3.87″N 80°57′33.57″W

Aircraft
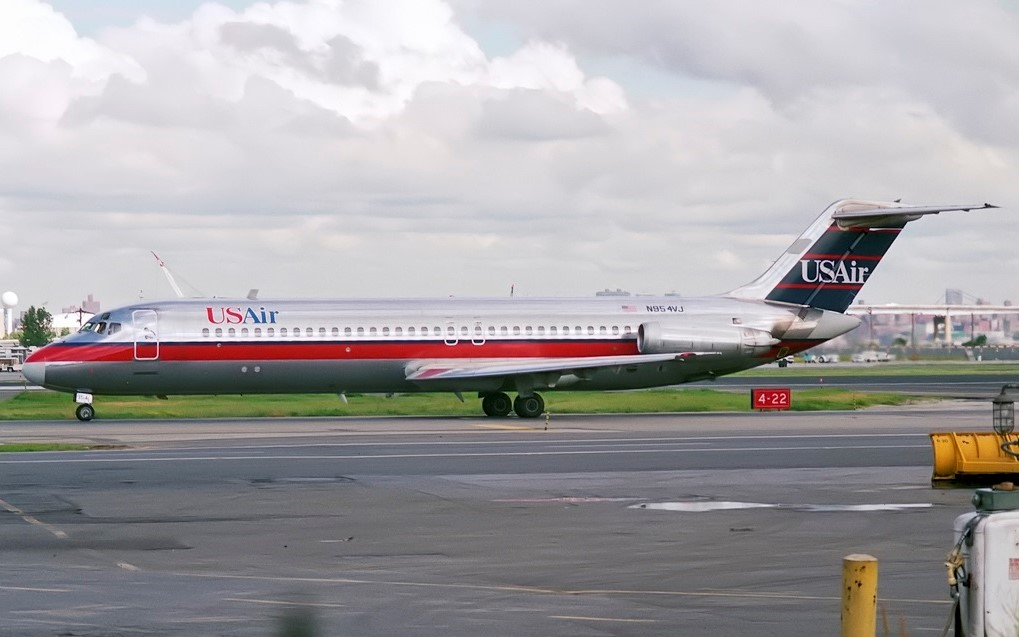
- N954VJ, the aircraft involved in the accident, seen in 1991
- Aircraft type: McDonnell Douglas DC-9-31
- Operator: USAir
- IATA flight No.: US1016
- ICAO flight No.: USA1016
- Call sign: US AIR 1016
- Registration: N954VJ
- Flight origin: Columbia Metropolitan Airport
- Destination: Charlotte/Douglas International Airport
- Occupants: 57
- Passengers: 52
- Crew: 5
- Fatalities: 37
- Injuries: 20
- Survivors: 20

USAir Flight 1016 was a regularly scheduled domestic passenger flight in the southeastern United States, between Columbia, South Carolina, and Charlotte, North Carolina. On July 2, 1994, the McDonnell Douglas DC-9-31 operating the flight encountered heavy thunderstorms and microburst-induced windshear while attempting to land, and crashed into heavy trees and a private residence near the airport. The crash and ensuing fire caused 37 fatalities and seriously injured 20 others.

== Aircraft ==
The aircraft involved was a McDonnell Douglas DC-9-31, MSN 47590, registered as N954VJ, which was manufactured by McDonnell Douglas in 1973. In its 21 years of service, the aircraft had logged approximately 53,917 airframe hours and 63,147 takeoff and landing cycles. It was equipped with two Pratt & Whitney JT8D-7B engines.

== Flight ==
=== History of the flight ===
On Saturday, July 2, 1994, the McDonnell Douglas DC-9, that was flying as USAir Flight 1016 departed Columbia Metropolitan Airport at 18:15 EDT for the 35-minute flight to Charlotte/Douglas International Airport. The crew consisted of Captain Michael R. Greenlee (38), First Officer James P. "Phil" Hayes (41), (Note: Captain Greenlee had 8,065 flight hours, including 1,970 hours on the DC-9. First Officer Hayes had 12,980 flight hours, including 3,180 hours on the DC-9.) and three flight attendants. There were 52 passengers (including two infants) on board. The flight was uneventful until the approach to Charlotte, where several severe thunderstorms were in the vicinity of the airport. At 18:38, Flight 1016 was cleared by Charlotte approach control for an instrument landing system (ILS) approach to Runway 18R (now 18C), with Hayes at the controls in heavy rain. The flight switched over to the local tower controller that was handling landings for 18R, and at 18:39, the controller gave the crew clearance to land. Captain Greenlee asked the controller for a weather report from the plane ahead of Flight 1016, a Fokker 100 that had just landed on 18R. The tower told Flight 1016 that the Fokker pilot reported "smooth sailing." In post-crash interviews, passengers and flight attendants told the NTSB that the flight seemed normal until the plane entered the heavy rain on final approach.

At 18:40, a tower controller issued a windshear warning to all aircraft, but on a different radio frequency than that used by Flight 1016. About a minute later, as Flight 1016 was on final approach, the captain, realizing that his aircraft was in a serious predicament, attempted to abort the landing by instructing the first officer to "take it around, go to the right." The captain then radioed the control tower and stated "USAir ten sixteen's on the go"; the tower acknowledged the missed approach and cleared Flight 1016 to climb to 3,000 feet (910 m). The plane struggled to climb in the severe weather conditions, veered to the right and rapidly descended. The flight crew desperately tried to control the airplane as it plummeted toward the ground. It was later determined that the windshear alert system did not alert the crew with a red indicator and aural warning because of a software discrepancy that lowered the sensitivity while the flaps were in transit from 40 to 15 degrees during the go-around procedure. A Honeywell engineer stated that the pilots should have received a warning eight to nine seconds before impact.

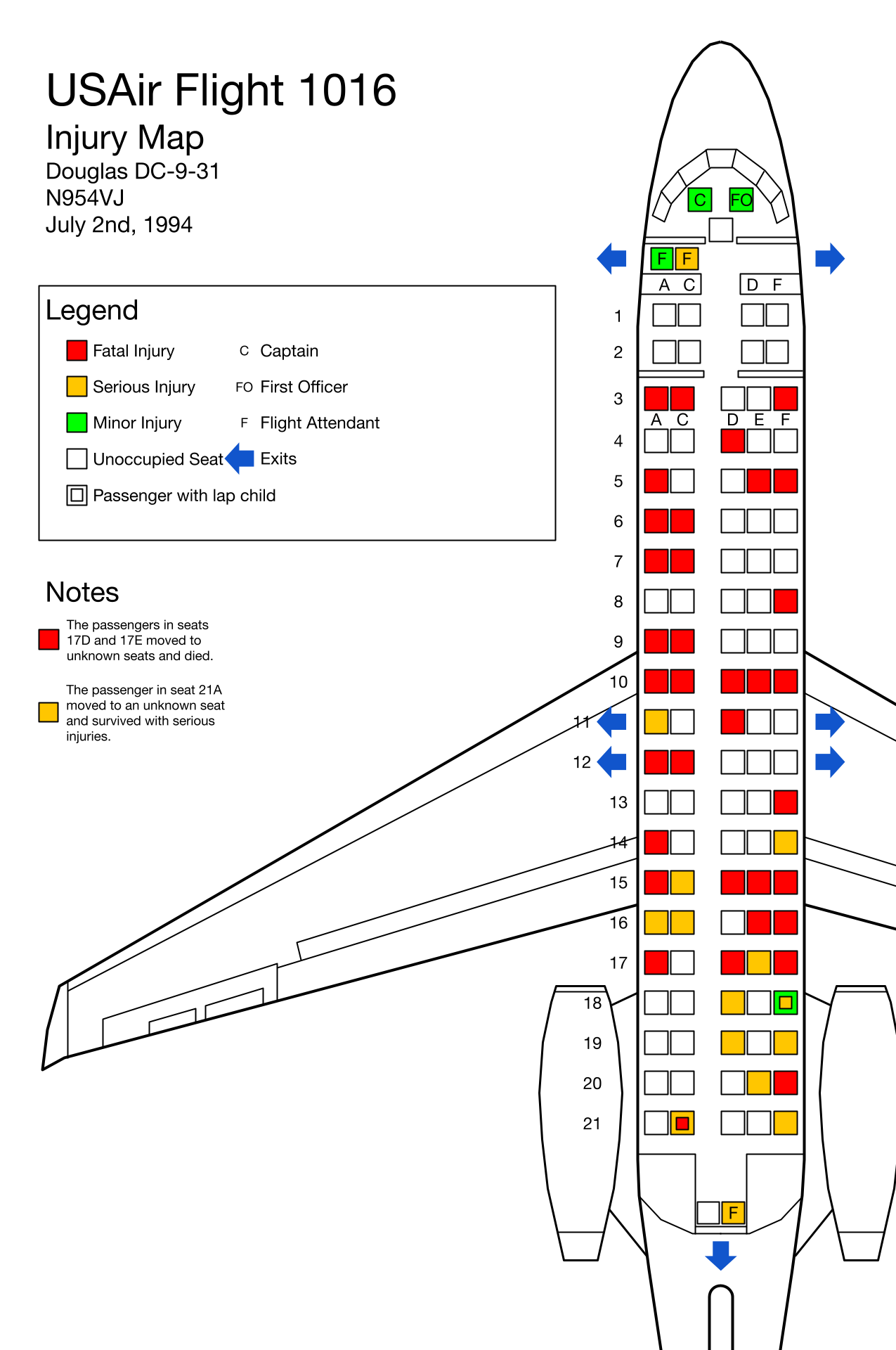
USAir Flight 1016 seating chart based on the NTSB report, revealing locations of passengers, lack of injury, severity of injuries, and deaths

=== Crash ===
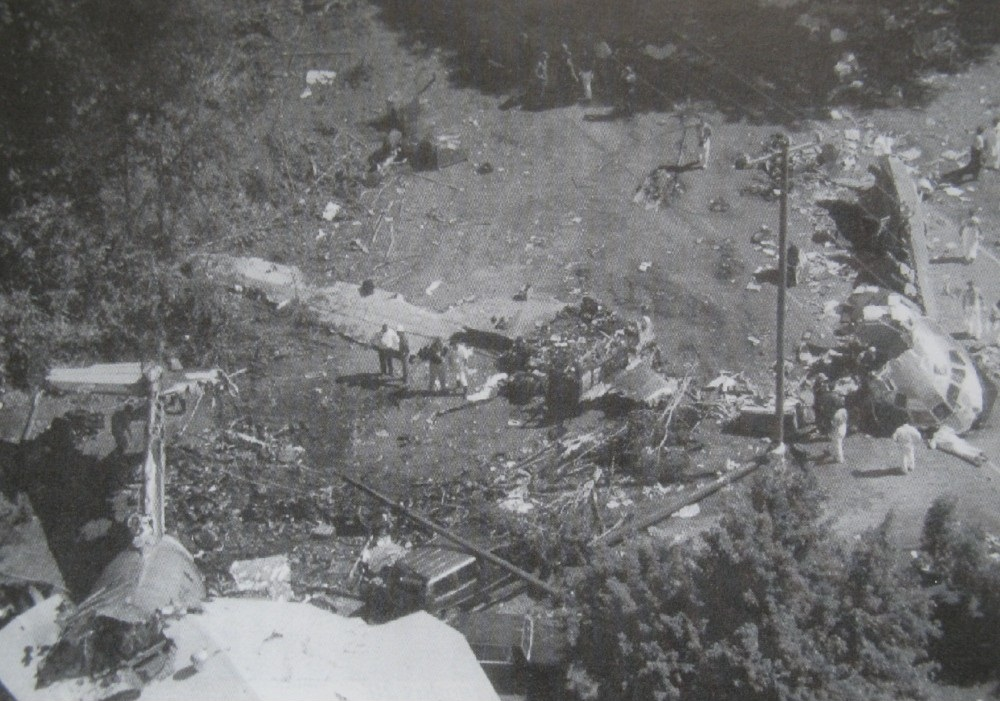
(L to R) Separated tail, wing and nose sections at the crash site

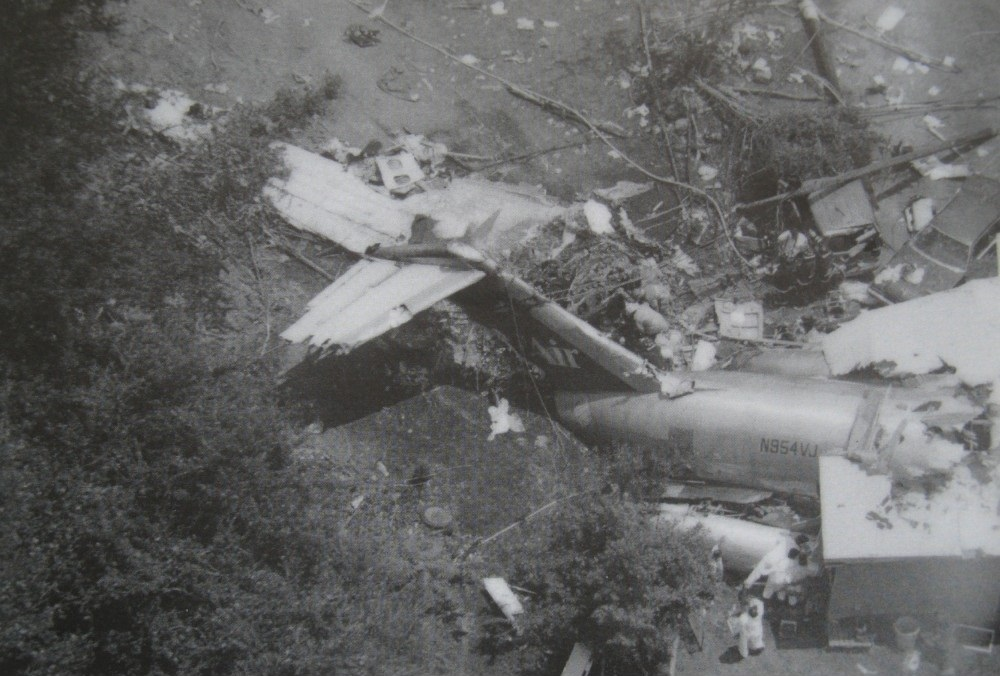
Tail section at the crash site

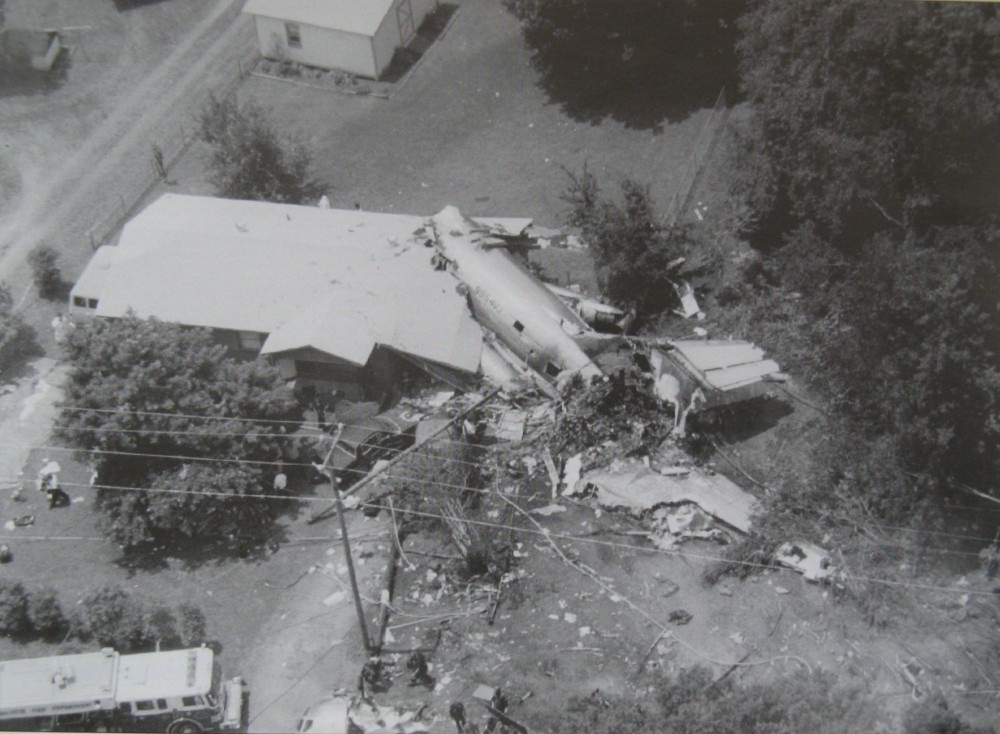
Full overview of the house which the rear section of the aircraft collided with

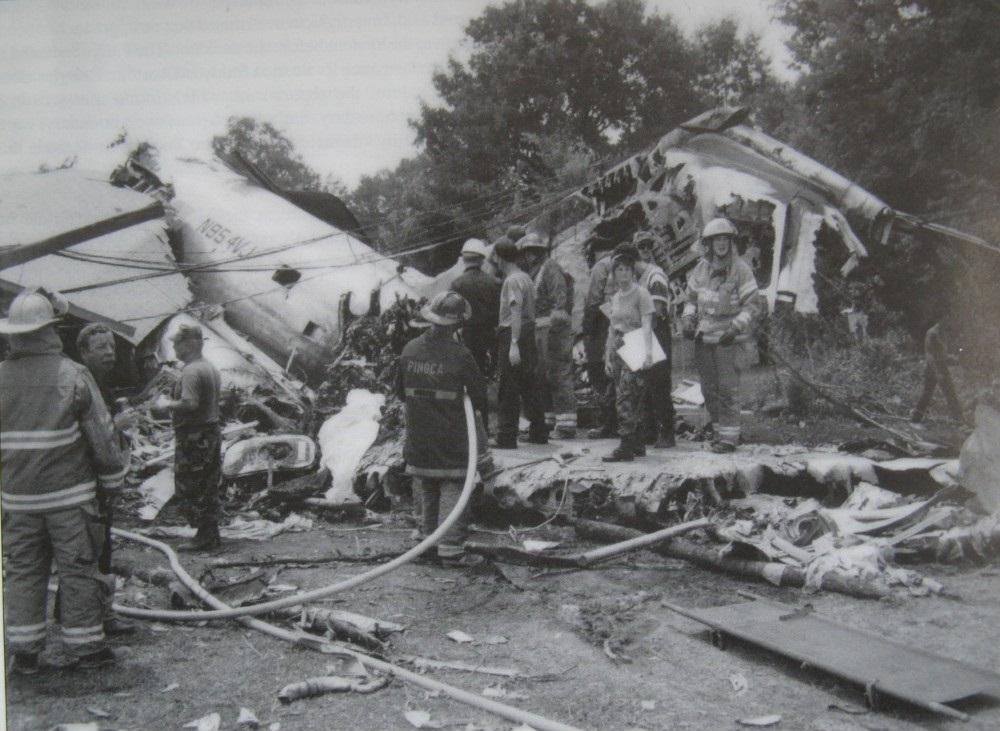
Rescuers at the crash site

At 18:42 EDT, the DC-9 touched down in a field within the airport boundary, about 0.5 miles (0.8 km) from the threshold of Runway 18R. It then crashed through the airport fence and impacted several trees, breaking apart while skidding down a residential street that was on the airport boundary. The plane broke into four major sections, and the front 40 feet (12 m), including the cockpit and the unoccupied first class passenger cabin, came to rest in the middle of Wallace Neel Road. The rear section of the fuselage, including the tail and the rear-mounted engines, came to rest in the carport of a house.

Of the 52 passengers, 37 died from blunt force trauma, burns from the fire or carbon monoxide inhalation. An additional 14 passengers suffered serious injuries, and one had minor injuries. Of the five crew members, both pilots suffered minor injuries, two flight attendants were seriously injured and the remaining flight attendant sustained minor injuries. No one on the ground was injured.

The airport's previous major incident occurred on September 11, 1974, when Eastern Air Lines Flight 212, also a DC-9, crashed during approach, killing 72.

== Investigation and response ==
The NTSB immediately dispatched an investigation team, which recovered the CVR and FDR from the plane's wreckage. After a lengthy investigation, the NTSB concluded that a microburst generated by the thunderstorm over the airport at the time of the crash was the probable cause of the accident. The NTSB listed these contributing factors:

1. The flight crew's decision to continue an approach to an area where a microburst was likely.
2. The failure of the flight crew to recognize wind shear quickly (exacerbated by an error in the wind shear alert software; the wind shear alert system should have warned them about 8–9 seconds prior to impact)
3. The failure of the flight crew to establish proper pitch and engine power that would have brought them out of the wind shear
4. The lack of timely weather information by air traffic control to the crew of Flight 1016

== Popular culture ==
The events of Flight 1016 are referenced in the 2003 episode "Racing the Storm", of the Canadian documentary TV series Mayday, which featured the crash in inclement weather of American Airlines Flight 1420. In 2017, Mayday returned to Flight 1016, making it the focus of the episode "Storming Out". Flight 1016 was also the subject of an episode of The Unexplained, a Biography Channel series.

== See also ==
- USAir Flight 427 – another fatal accident involving USAir that happened two months later
- Delta Air Lines Flight 191
- Southern Airways Flight 242
- Martinair Flight 495
- Pan Am Flight 759
- Pan Am Flight 806
- American Airlines Flight 1420
- Georgian Airways Flight 834
- 1956 Kano Airport BOAC Argonaut crash
- 1950 Air France multiple Douglas DC-4 accidents
- Airborne wind shear detection and alert system
- Aeroméxico Connect Flight 2431
- Low level windshear alert system
- Eastern Air Lines Flight 66
