= Battleship Island =

Battleship Island may refer to:

== Places ==
- Hashima Island, Japan
- Mitsukejima, Japan
- Battleship Island (Alaska), U.S.
- Battleship Island (Washington), U.S.

== Other uses ==
- The Battleship Island, a 2017 South Korean film
