= Airborne wind shear detection and alert system =

Aircraft instrument

The airborne wind shear detection and alert system, fitted in an aircraft, detects and alerts the pilot both visually and aurally of a wind shear condition. A reactive wind shear detection system is activated by the aircraft flying into an area with a wind shear condition of sufficient force to pose a hazard to the aircraft. A predictive wind shear detection system is activated by the presence of a wind shear condition ahead of the aircraft. In 1988, the U.S. Federal Aviation Administration (FAA) mandated that all turbine-powered commercial aircraft must have on-board wind shear detection systems by 1993. Airlines successfully lobbied to have commercial turbo-prop aircraft exempted from this requirement.

In the predictive wind shear detection mode, the weather radar processor of the aircraft detects the presence of a microburst, a type of vertical wind shear condition, by detecting the Doppler frequency shift of the microwave pulses caused by the microburst ahead of the aircraft, and displays the area where it is present in the Navigation Display Unit (of the Electronic Flight Instrument System) along with an aural warning.

== History of development ==
In June 1975, Eastern Air Lines Flight 66 crashed on approach to New York JFK Airport due to microburst-induced wind shear. Then, in July 1982, Pan Am Flight 759 crashed on takeoff from New Orleans International Airport in similar weather conditions. Finally, in August 1985, wind shear and inadequate reactions by the pilots caused the crash of Delta Air Lines Flight 191 on approach to Dallas/Fort Worth International Airport in a thunderstorm.

On July 24, 1986, the FAA and NASA signed a memorandum of agreement to formally begin the Airborne Wind-Shear Detection and Avoidance Program (AWDAP). As a result, a wind-shear program was established in the Flight Systems Directorate of NASA's Langley Research Center. After five years of intensely studying various weather phenomena and sensor technologies, the researchers decided to validate their findings in actual flight conditions. They chose an extensively modified Boeing 737, which was equipped with a rear research cockpit in place of the forward section of the passenger cabin. A modified Rockwell Collins model 708 X-band ground-based radar unit was used in the AWDAP experiments. The real-time radar processor system used during 1992 flight experiments was a VME bus-based system with a Motorola 68030 host processor and three DSP boards.

On September 1, 1994, the weather radar model RDR-4B of the Allied-Signal/Bendix (now Honeywell) became the first predictive wind-shear system to be certified for commercial airline operations. In the same year, Continental Airlines became the first commercial carrier to install an airborne predictive wind-shear detection system on its aircraft. By June 1996, Rockwell Collins and Westinghouse's Defense and Electronics Group (now Grumman/Martin) also came up with FAA-certified predictive wind-shear detection systems.

The IEEE Intelligent Transportation Systems Society is conducting research for further development of this system.

== See also ==
- USAir Flight 1016
- Delta Air Lines Flight 191
- Pan Am Flight 759
- Eastern Air Lines Flight 66
- Terminal Doppler Weather Radar
- Low-level windshear alert system
