= Pan Am Flight 806 =

1974 aviation accident

Pan American Flight 806
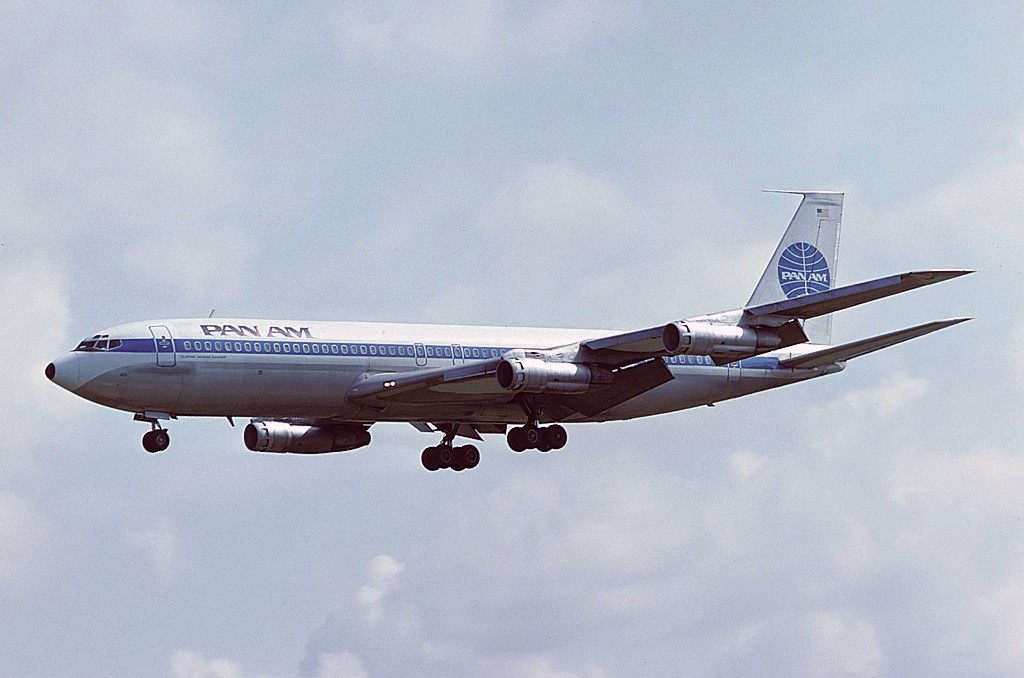
- A Pan Am B707-321B, similar to one involved the accident

Accident
- Date: January 30, 1974
- Summary: Controlled flight into terrain due to bad weather
- Site: 0.8 mi (1.3 km) from Pago Pago International Airport, American Samoa; 14°20′55″S 170°43′55″W

Aircraft
- Aircraft type: Boeing 707-321B
- Aircraft name: Clipper Radiant
- Operator: Pan American World Airways
- Call sign: CLIPPER 806
- Registration: N454PA
- Flight origin: Auckland International Airport
- 1st stopover: Pago Pago International Airport
- 2nd stopover: Honolulu International Airport
- Destination: Los Angeles International Airport
- Occupants: 101
- Passengers: 91
- Crew: 10
- Fatalities: 97
- Injuries: 4
- Survivors: 4

Pan Am Flight 806 was an international scheduled flight from Auckland, New Zealand, to Los Angeles, California, with intermediate stops at Pago Pago, American Samoa and Honolulu, Hawaii. On January 30, 1974, the Boeing 707 Clipper Radiant crashed on approach to Pago Pago International Airport, killing 87 passengers and ten crew members, making it the deadliest aviation incident in American Samoan history.

The National Transportation Safety Board (NTSB) determined the probable cause of the accident was the flight crew's tardy identification of microburst-induced wind shear. Other factors included poor visibility, a lack of altitude, and airspeed callouts by the aircrew.

== Aircraft and flight crew ==
The aircraft involved was a Boeing 707-321B powered by Pratt & Whitney JT3D-3B engines. It had accumulated 21,625 airframe hours since its first flight in 1967.

This 707 was piloted by Captain Leroy Petersen, age 52, who had 17,414 hours of pilot time of which 7,416 hours were in the 707. The copilot was First Officer Richard Gaines, 37, with 5,107 total piloting hours all in the 707. The Third officer was James Phillips, 43, with 5,208 total pilot hours of which 4,706 were on the 707 and the flight engineer was Gerry Green, 37, who had 2,399 total hours as both a Flight Engineer and reserve first officer of which 1,444 were on the 707.

Although Gaines was scheduled to act as First Officer on the flight, he had become ill with laryngitis and as such was replaced by Third Officer Phillips, who acted as First Officer whilst Gaines stayed in the cockpit in the jumpseat.

== Accident ==
At 20:14 (8:14 PM), Flight 806 departed Auckland with 91 passengers and 10 crewmembers on board with an instrument flight rules (IFR) flight plan to Pago Pago.

At 23:34(11:34 PM), Flight 806 had descended to 5,500 feet (1,700 m), and captured the 226 degree radial of the Pago Pago VHF omnidirectional range (VOR), and were flying the reciprocal heading of 46 degrees. Pago Pago Approach Control reported winds zero one zero(10) degrees at one five (15), gusting two zero (20).

The flight was receiving signals from the Localizer and was using the Instrument landing system (ILS) for runway 5. At 23:38 (11:38 PM), the approach controller informed the flight of a mean rain shower at the airport, and then at 23:39 (11:39 PM) stated the wind is zero three zero (30) degrees at two zero (20), gusting two five (25). The flight transmitted "Eight zero six, wilco" at 23:39:41. This was the last communication received from Flight 806.

The Cockpit voice recorder (CVR) recorded normal cockpit conversation during the last minute of the flight. At 23:40:22 the co-pilot said "You're a little high" and at 23:40:33 "You're at minimums." At 23:40:35 the first officer stated "Field in sight" then "Turn to your right" followed by "hundred and forty knots." No further conversation was recorded by the CVR.

At 23:40:42 the 707 came in contact with trees 3,865 feet (1,178 m) short of the runway 5 threshold. The aircraft first impacted the ground 236 feet further and plowed through dense vegetation for another 539 feet (164 m) before crashing into a three foot high rock wall. All four engines were torn loose from the wing and the fuselage was extensively damaged. A post-impact fire consumed most of the aircraft.

== Aftermath ==
The crew of 10 and 87 passengers ultimately died as a direct cause of the accident. Notably, all the passengers and crew survived the initial impact. Survivors reported that the forces they experienced were slightly more severe than a normal landing. After examination the cabin interior was found to be undamaged by the crash.

American serigraph artist Elton Bennett died in the accident alongside his wife. Among the survivors was the US Olympic diving coach Dick Smith.

Nine passengers and one crew member, Third Officer Phillips, survived the initial crash and post-accident fire. One passenger died the day after the accident. Three days after the accident, the remaining crew member and three passengers died. One passenger died nine days after the accident. According to NTSB 49 CFR part 830, fatalities occurring more than seven days after the accident shall not be attributed to said accident.

== Investigation ==
The NTSB's final report dated October 6, 1977 determined that the probable cause of the accident was:

The flight crew's late recognition, and failure to correct in a timely manner, an excessive descent rate which developed as a result of the aircraft's penetration through destabilizing wind changes. The winds consisted of horizontal and vertical components produced by a heavy rainstorm and influenced by uneven terrain close to the aircraft's approach path. The captain's recognition was hampered by restricted visibility, the illusory effects of a "black hole" approach, inadequate monitoring of flight instruments, and the failure of the crew to call out descent rate during the last 15 seconds of flight.

== See also ==
- Pan Am Flight 759, another Pan Am plane that encountered a microburst induced wind-shear and crashed
- Delta Air Lines Flight 191
- USAir Flight 1016
- Aeromexico Connect Flight 2431
