= Eastern Air Lines Flight 66 =

1975 aviation accident in New York

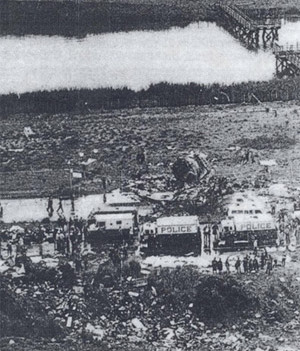
- Aerial view of the crash site

Accident
- Date: June 24, 1975
- Summary: Crash on approach as a result of microburst-induced wind shear
- Site: John F. Kennedy International Airport, Jamaica, Queens, New York, United States; 40°39′N 73°45′W

Aircraft
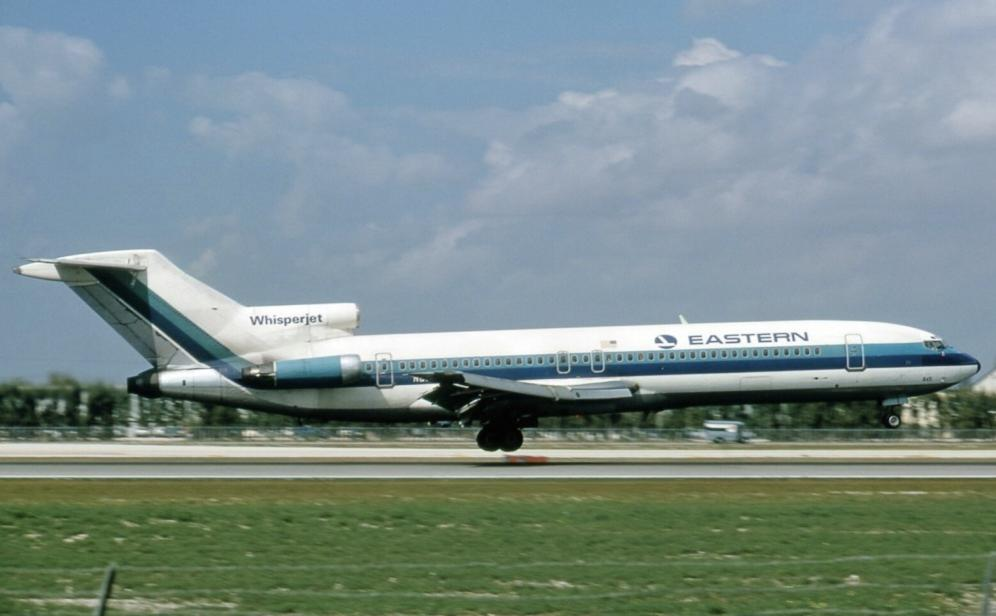
- N8845E, the aircraft involved in the accident, pictured in 1974
- Aircraft type: Boeing 727-225
- Operator: Eastern Air Lines
- IATA flight No.: EA66
- ICAO flight No.: EAL66
- Call sign: EASTERN 66
- Registration: N8845E
- Flight origin: New Orleans International Airport, New Orleans, Louisiana, United States
- Destination: John F. Kennedy International Airport, Jamaica, Queens, New York, United States
- Occupants: 124
- Passengers: 116
- Crew: 8
- Fatalities: 113 (Note: Although the NTSB's final report only lists 112 "fatal" injuries, a total of 113 people died as a result of the crash. One fatality, a passenger who initially survived the crash but died 9 days later, was officially recorded by the NTSB as a "nonfatal" injury. In its final report, the NTSB explained that at the time, 49 CFR 830.2 defined "fatal injury" as an injury that results in death within 7 days of an accident. In accordance with regulation, the NTSB counted this deceased passenger among the 12 "nonfatal" injuries. The regulation has since been revised, and as of February 2016, any injury resulting in death within 30 days is now deemed a "fatal injury".)
- Injuries: 11
- Survivors: 11

Eastern Air Lines Flight 66 was a regularly scheduled flight from New Orleans to New York City that crashed on June 24, 1975, when a Boeing 727-225 went on approach to New York's John F. Kennedy International Airport, killing 113 of the 124 people on board. The accident was determined to be caused by wind shear stemming from a microburst, but the failure of the airport and the flight crew to recognize the severe weather hazard was also a contributing factor.

== Background ==
Eastern Air Lines Flight 66 was a regularly scheduled passenger flight from New Orleans International Airport to John F. Kennedy International Airport in Jamaica, Queens, New York. On Tuesday, June 24, 1975, Flight 66 was operated using a Boeing 727 trijet, registration number N8845E.

The flight departed from New Orleans at 13:19 EDT (Note: The NTSB describes all times in its final report using Eastern Daylight Time.) with 124 people on board, including 116 passengers and eight crew members. The flight operated from New Orleans to the New York City area without any reported difficulty.

The flight crew consisted of the following:

- The captain was 54-year-old John W. Kleven, who had been serving with Eastern Air Lines for nearly 25 years and had been a 727 captain since July 10, 1968. Kleven had a total of 17,381 flight hours, including 2,813 hours on the Boeing 727.
- The first officer was 34-year-old William Eberhart, who had been with Eastern Air Lines for nearly nine years. He had 5,063 flight hours, of which 4,327 were on the Boeing 727.
- The flight engineer was 31-year-old Gary M. Geurin, who had been with Eastern Air Lines since 1968 and had 3,910 flight hours, 3,123 of which were on the Boeing 727.
- The second flight engineer, 33-year-old Peter J. McCullough, had been with Eastern Air Lines for four years and had 3,602 military flying hours and 1,767 civil flying hours, including 676 hours on the Boeing 727. He was administering a required flight check on Geurin.

== Accident ==
A severe thunderstorm arrived at JFK just as Flight 66 was approaching the New York City area. At 15:35, the crew was instructed to contact the JFK approach controller for instructions, and the approach controller sequenced it into the approach pattern for Runway 22L. At 15:52, the approach controller warned all incoming aircraft that the airport was experiencing "very light rain showers and haze" and zero visibility and that all approaching aircraft must land using instrument flight rules.

At 15:53, Flight 66 was switched to another frequency for final approach to Runway 22L. Controllers sent the crew radar vectors to operate around the approaching thunderstorms and sequence into the landing pattern with other traffic. Because of the deteriorating weather, one of the crew members checked the weather at LaGuardia Airport in Flushing, Queens, the flight's alternate airport. At 15:59, the controller warned all aircraft of "a severe wind shift" on final approach and advised that more information would be reported shortly. Although communications on the frequency continued to report deteriorating weather, Flight 66 continued on its approach to Runway 22L. At 16:02, the crew was told to contact the JFK tower controller for landing clearance.

At 16:05, on final approach to Runway 22L, the aircraft entered a microburst or wind shear environment caused by the severe storms. The aircraft continued its descent until it struck the approach lights approximately 2,400 feet (730 m) from the threshold of the runway. After the initial impact, the plane banked to the left and continued to strike the approach lights until it burst into flames and scattered the wreckage along Rockaway Boulevard, which runs along the northeast perimeter of the airport. (Note: In the aftermath of the crash, Rockaway Boulevard was closed for some time.) Of the 124 people on board, 107 passengers and six crew members (including all four cockpit crew members) were killed. The other 11 people on board, including nine passengers and two flight attendants, were injured but survived.

The accident was the deadliest single-aircraft accident in United States history to date, and would remain so until the crash of Pacific Southwest Airlines Flight 182 on September 25, 1978 in San Diego, which killed 135 persons on the Boeing 727, and nine more on the ground and in the Cessna which collided with it. This unfortunate record was surpassed only eight months later, with the crash of American Airlines Flight 191 on May 25, 1979, which killed 273 and still stands as America's deadliest. The victims of the Eastern crash included New York Nets player Wendell Ladner, Episcopal Bishop of Louisiana Iveson B. Noland, and construction executive Saul Horowitz Jr.

== Investigation and results ==
The accident was investigated by the National Transportation Safety Board (NTSB), which revealed that minutes before Flight 66's crash, a Flying Tiger Line Douglas DC-8 cargo jet landing on Runway 22L reported tremendous wind shear on the ground. The pilot warned the tower of the wind-shear conditions, but other aircraft continued to land. After the DC-8 landed, an Eastern Air Lines Lockheed L-1011 landing on the same runway nearly crashed. Two more aircraft landed before Flight 66 attempted its landing. According to the conversation recorded by the cockpit voice recorder, the captain of Flight 66 was aware of reports of severe wind shear on the final-approach path (which he confirmed by radio to the final-vector controller), but decided to continue nonetheless.

The NTSB published its final report on March 12, 1976, determining the following probable cause of the accident:

The National Transportation Safety Board determines that the probable cause of this accident was the aircraft's encounter with adverse winds associated with a very strong thunderstorm located astride the ILS localizer course, which resulted in high descent rate into the non-frangible approach light towers. The flight crew's delayed recognition and correction of the high descent rate were probably associated with their reliance upon visual cues rather than on flight instrument reference. However, the adverse winds might have been too severe for a successful approach and landing even had they relied upon and responded rapidly to the indications of the flight instruments.

The NTSB also concluded that failure of either air traffic controllers or the flight crew to abort the landing, given the severe weather conditions, also contributed to the accident:

Contributing to the accident was the continued use of runway 22L when it should have become evident to both air traffic control personnel and the flight crew that a severe weather hazard existed along the approach path.

== Legacy ==
The accident led to the development of the original low-level wind-shear alert system by the U.S. Federal Aviation Administration in 1976, which was installed at 110 FAA-staffed airports between 1977 and 1987. The accident also led to the discovery of downbursts, a weather phenomenon that creates vertical wind shear and poses dangers to landing aircraft, and it sparked decades of research into downburst and microburst phenomena and their effects on aircraft.

The concept of downbursts was not yet understood when Flight 66 crashed. During the investigation, meteorologist Ted Fujita worked with the NTSB and the Eastern Air Lines flight-safety department to study the weather phenomena encountered by Flight 66. Fujita identified "cells of intense downdrafts" during the storm that caused aircraft flying through them "considerable difficulties in landing." Fujita named this phenomenon "downburst cells" and determined that a plane can be "seriously affected" by "a downburst of air current." Fujita proposed new methods of detecting and identifying downbursts, including installation of additional weather monitoring equipment at the approach ends of active runways, and also proposed development of new procedures for immediately communicating downburst detection to incoming aircraft.

Fujita's downburst theory was not immediately accepted by the aviation meteorology community. However, the crashes of Pan Am Flight 759 in 1982 and Delta Air Lines Flight 191 in 1985 prompted the aviation community to reevaluate and ultimately accept Fujita's theory and to begin researching downburst/microburst detection-and-avoidance systems in earnest.

== See also ==
- Aviation safety
- 1956 Kano Airport BOAC Argonaut crash
- Delta Air Lines Flight 191
- USAir Flight 1016
- Aeromexico Connect Flight 2431
- Pan Am Flight 759 - another fatal crash caused by wind shear which took off from New Orleans International Airport
- Martinair Flight 495
- United Nations Flight 834
- 1950 Air France multiple Douglas DC-4 accidents
