= Elton Bennett =

American serigraph artist

Elton Bennett (June 2, 1910 – January 30, 1974) was a 20th-century American artist living and working in the Northwest.

Born in 1910 in Cosmopolis, Washington, Bennett grew up and worked on the Washington coast, attended art school at the age of 36 and by 1956 became a full-time artist making serigraphs or silk screen prints. He continued working until his death with his wife in 1974 in the crash of Pan Am Flight 806.

== Style ==
Bennett chose the silkscreen medium because of his belief that original art should be accessible to everyone. Prints allowed him to produce many original silkscreens at relatively affordable prices. Despite the fact that his prints now sell for hundreds or thousands of dollars, according to his daughter during his lifetime he never sold one for more than $15. Using silkscreens allowed him to vary the work by changing the colors and recombining or reusing elements to the point where a work was never finished and continually evolving - he could always tinker with it and improve it more. For example, a catalog of his artwork might include multiple images of a scene such as "Around the Cape" using different color pallets, such as blues, gold, greens, etc. or the same middle-background sailing ship may appear in multiple scenes such as "Down to the Sea", "Return to the River", and "Forest of Spars".

== Subjects ==
The coast of the Pacific Northwest, the sea, ships, and landscapes that Bennett grew up with and worked among were his primary subjects. People are relatively rare, and almost never the main subject, appearing as silhouettes on shore or on a ship. Often the rain and weather of the north pacific coast are nearly as prominent as the main subject. These elements often contribute to a peaceful loneliness in the images.

The subjects also very much reflect the technology of the early period of his life. Tall ships, steam ships and old lumber mills are often featured in his prints. Sometimes the transition in technology is represented, as with the steam tug-boat pulling the sailing ship in "Down to the Sea" or the inboard-powered, double-ended fishing troller passing the schooner going the opposite direction in "Journey into Silence".
