= Battleship Island (Alaska) =

Island in Juneau City and Borough, Alaska, United States

- Location within Alaska

Geography
- Location: Juneau City and Borough, Alaska
- Coordinates: 58°21′34″N 134°39′47″W
- Archipelago: Alexander Archipelago
- Width: 0.1 mi (0.2 km)
- Highest elevation: 0 ft (0 m)

Administration
- United States
- State: Alaska
- Borough: Juneau

Battleship Island is an island in the City and Borough of Juneau, Alaska, United States. Located in the Auke Bay portion of Lynn Canal, it is 1.6 mi (2.6 km) south of the village of Auke Bay, Alaska, and 9.9 mi (15.9 km) northwest of the city of Juneau. The name was reported in a 1957 publication by R. N. DeArmond.

The Federal Aviation Administration erected a low level windshear alert system tower on the island in order to assist incoming pilots to Juneau International Airport. Battleship Island is a part of the Channel Islands State Marine Park; it is used for picnicking and camping.

== Geographical location ==
Battleship Island is an island in the Borough of Juneau in Alaska. The name was reported in a 1957 publication by R. N. DeArmond. It was collected by the United States Geological Survey between 1976 and 1981, and entered into the Geographic Names Information System on March 31, 1981. The island has a diameter of 0.1 mi (160 m).

=== Location in relation to other towns ===
It is located in the Auke Bay portion of Lynn Canal, it is 1.6 mi (2.6 km) south of the village of Auke Bay, Alaska, and 9.9 mi (15.9 km) northwest of the city of Juneau.

== Official status ==
The Federal Aviation Administration erected a low level windshear alert system tower on the island in order to assist incoming pilots to Juneau International Airport. Battleship Island is a part of the Channel Islands State Marine Park; it is used for picnicking and camping.
