= Wind shear =

Difference in wind speed or direction over a short distance

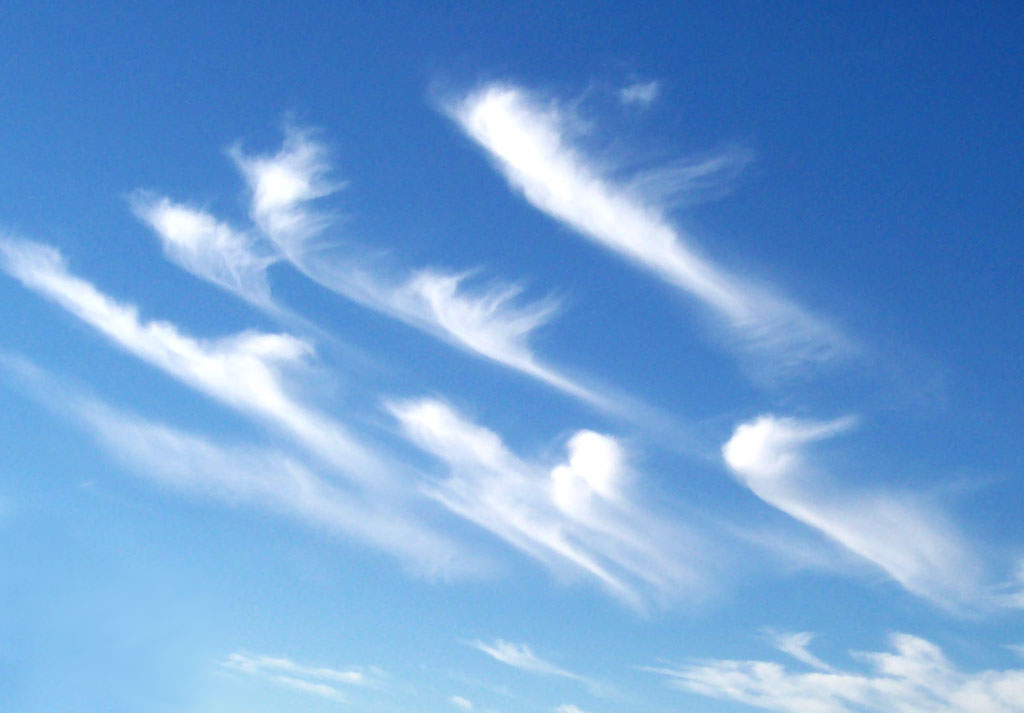
Cirrus uncinus ice crystal plumes showing high-level wind shear, with changes in wind speed and direction

Wind shear (/ʃɪər/; also written windshear), sometimes referred to as wind gradient, is a difference in wind speed and/or direction over a relatively short distance in the atmosphere. Atmospheric wind shear is normally described as either vertical or horizontal wind shear. Vertical wind shear is a change in wind speed or direction with a change in altitude. Horizontal wind shear is a change in wind speed with a change in lateral position for a given altitude.

Wind shear is a microscale meteorological phenomenon occurring over a very small distance, but it can be associated with mesoscale or synoptic scale weather features such as squall lines and cold fronts. It is commonly observed near microbursts and downbursts caused by thunderstorms, fronts, areas of locally higher low-level winds referred to as low-level jets, near mountains, radiation inversions that occur due to clear skies and calm winds, buildings, wind turbines, and sailboats. Wind shear has significant effects on the control of an aircraft, and it has been the only or a contributing cause of many aircraft accidents.

Sound movement through the atmosphere is affected by wind shear, which can bend the wave front, causing sounds to be heard where they normally would not. Strong vertical wind shear within the troposphere also inhibits tropical cyclone development but helps to organize individual thunderstorms into longer life cycles which can then produce severe weather. The thermal wind concept explains how differences in wind speed at different heights are dependent on horizontal temperature differences and explains the existence of the jet stream.

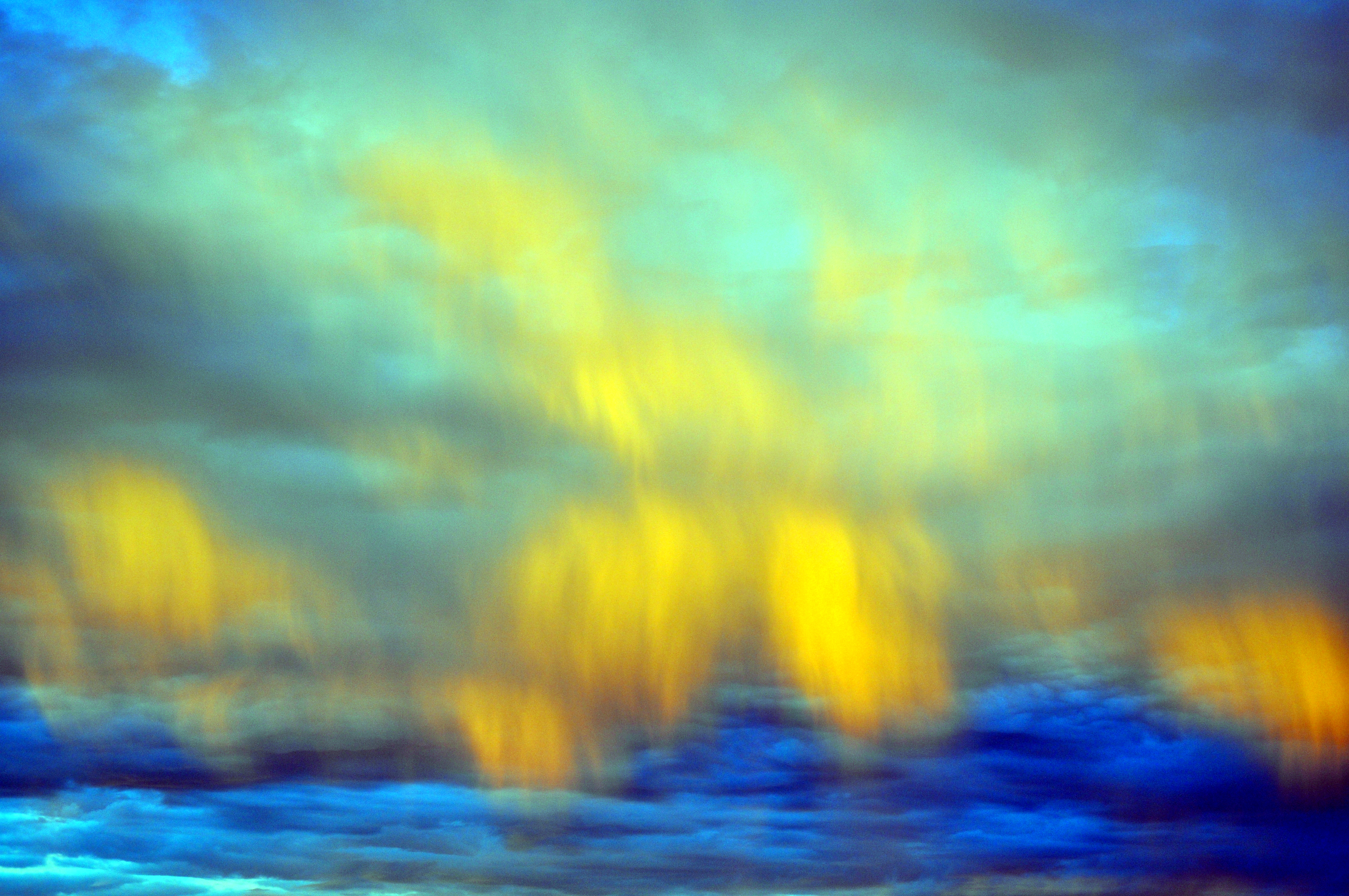
Down draft winds with associated virga allow these clouds in the eastern sky at civil twilight to mimic aurora borealis in the Mojave Desert.

== Definition ==
Wind shear refers to the variation of wind velocity over either horizontal or vertical distances. Airplane pilots generally regard significant wind shear to be a horizontal change in airspeed of 30 knots (15 m/s) for light aircraft, and near 45 knots (23 m/s) for airliners at flight altitude. Vertical speed changes greater than 4.9 knots (2.5 m/s) also qualify as significant wind shear for aircraft. Low-level wind shear can affect aircraft airspeed during takeoff and landing in disastrous ways, and airliner pilots are trained to avoid all microburst wind shear (headwind loss in excess of 30 knots [15 m/s]). The rationale for this additional caution includes:

- microburst intensity can double in a minute or less,
- the winds can shift to excessive crosswinds,
- 40–50 knots (21–26 m/s) is the threshold for survivability at some stages of low-altitude operations, and
- several of the historical wind shear accidents involved 35–45 knots (18–23 m/s) microbursts.

Wind shear is also a key factor in the formation of severe thunderstorms. The additional hazard of turbulence is often associated with wind shear.

== Occurrence ==
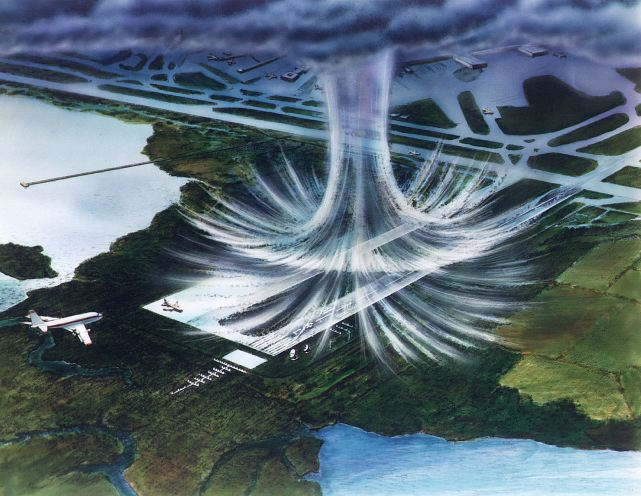
Microburst schematic from NASA. The direction of travel is downward until the air current hits ground level, at which point it spreads outward in all directions. The wind regime in a microburst is completely opposite to a tornado.

Weather situations where shear is observed include:

- Weather fronts. Significant shear is observed when the temperature difference across the front is 5 °C (9 °F) or more, and the front moves at 30 knots (15 m/s) or faster. Because fronts are three-dimensional phenomena, frontal shear can be observed at any altitude between surface and tropopause, and can therefore be seen both horizontally and vertically. Vertical wind shear above warm fronts is more of an aviation concern than near and behind cold fronts due to their greater duration.
- Upper-level jet streams. Associated with upper-level jet streams is a phenomenon known as clear-air turbulence (CAT), caused by vertical and horizontal wind shear connected to the wind gradient at the edge of the jet streams. The CAT is strongest on the anticyclonic shear side of the jet, usually next to or just below the axis of the jet.
- Low-level jet streams. When a nocturnal low-level jet forms overnight above Earth's surface ahead of a cold front, significant low-level vertical wind shear can develop near the lower portion of the low-level jet. This is also known as non-convective wind shear as it is not due to nearby thunderstorms.
- Mountains.
- Inversions. When on a clear and calm night, a radiation inversion is formed near the ground, the friction does not affect wind above the top of the inversion layer. The change in wind can be 90 degrees in direction and 40 knots (21 m/s) in speed. Even a nocturnal (overnight) low-level jet can sometimes be observed. It tends to be strongest towards sunrise. Density differences cause additional problems to aviation.
- Downbursts. When an outflow boundary forms due to a shallow layer of rain-cooled air spreading out near ground level from the parent thunderstorm, both speed and directional wind shear can result at the leading edge of the three-dimensional boundary. The stronger the outflow boundary is, the stronger the resultant vertical wind shear will become.

== Horizontal component ==
=== Weather fronts ===
Weather fronts are boundaries between two masses of air of different densities, or different temperature and moisture properties, which normally are convergence zones in the wind field and are the principal cause of significant weather. Within surface weather analyses, they are depicted using various colored lines and symbols. The air masses usually differ in temperature and may also differ in humidity. Wind shear in the horizontal occurs near these boundaries. Cold fronts feature narrow bands of thunderstorms and severe weather and may be preceded by squall lines and dry lines. Cold fronts are sharper surface boundaries with more significant horizontal wind shear than warm fronts. When a front becomes stationary, it can degenerate into a line that separates regions of differing wind speed, known as a shear line, though the wind direction across the front normally remains constant. In the tropics, tropical waves move from east to west across the Atlantic and eastern Pacific basins. Directional and speed shear can occur across the axis of stronger tropical waves, as northerly winds precede the wave axis and southeast winds are seen behind the wave axis. Horizontal wind shear can also occur along the local land breeze and sea breeze boundaries.

=== Near coastlines ===
Wind shear along the coast with low-level clouds moving towards the east and higher-level clouds moving towards the south-west

The magnitude of winds offshore is nearly double the wind speed observed onshore. This is attributed to the differences in friction between landmasses and offshore waters. Sometimes, there are even directional differences, particularly if local sea breezes change the wind on shore during daylight hours.

== Vertical component ==
=== Thermal wind ===
Thermal wind is a meteorological term not referring to an actual wind, but a difference in the geostrophic wind between two pressure levels p_{1} and p_{0}, with p_{1} < p_{0}; in essence, wind shear. It is only present in an atmosphere with horizontal changes in temperature (or in an ocean with horizontal gradients of density), i.e., baroclinicity. In a barotropic atmosphere, where temperature is uniform, the geostrophic wind is independent of height. The name stems from the fact that this wind flows around areas of low (and high) temperature in the same manner as the geostrophic wind flows around areas of low (and high) pressure.

The thermal wind equation is

$$f \mathbf{v}_T = \mathbf{k} \times \nabla \left( \boldsymbol{\varphi}_1 - \boldsymbol{\varphi}_0 \right) \,,$$

where the φ are geopotential height fields with φ_{1} > φ_{0}, f is the Coriolis parameter, and k is the upward-pointing unit vector in the vertical direction. The thermal wind equation does not determine the wind in the tropics. Since f is small or zero, such as near the equator, the equation reduces to stating that ∇(φ_{1} − φ_{0}) is small.

This equation basically describes the existence of the jet stream, a westerly current of air with maximum wind speeds close to the tropopause which is (even though other factors are also important) the result of the temperature contrast between equator and pole.

=== Effects on tropical cyclones ===
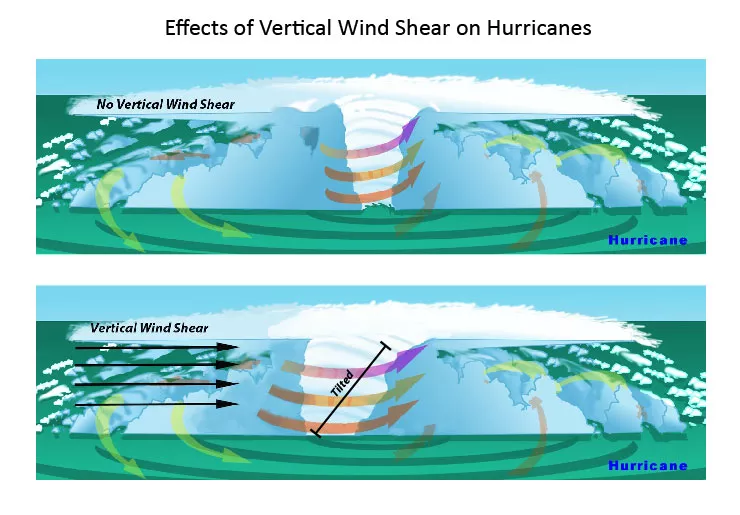
Graphic showing the effects wind shear on hurricanes

Tropical cyclones are, in essence, heat engines that are fueled by the temperature gradient between the warm tropical ocean surface and the colder upper atmosphere. Tropical cyclone development requires relatively low values of vertical wind shear so that their warm core can remain above their surface circulation center, thereby promoting intensification. Strongly sheared tropical cyclones weaken as the upper circulation is blown away from the low-level center.

=== Effects on thunderstorms and severe weather ===
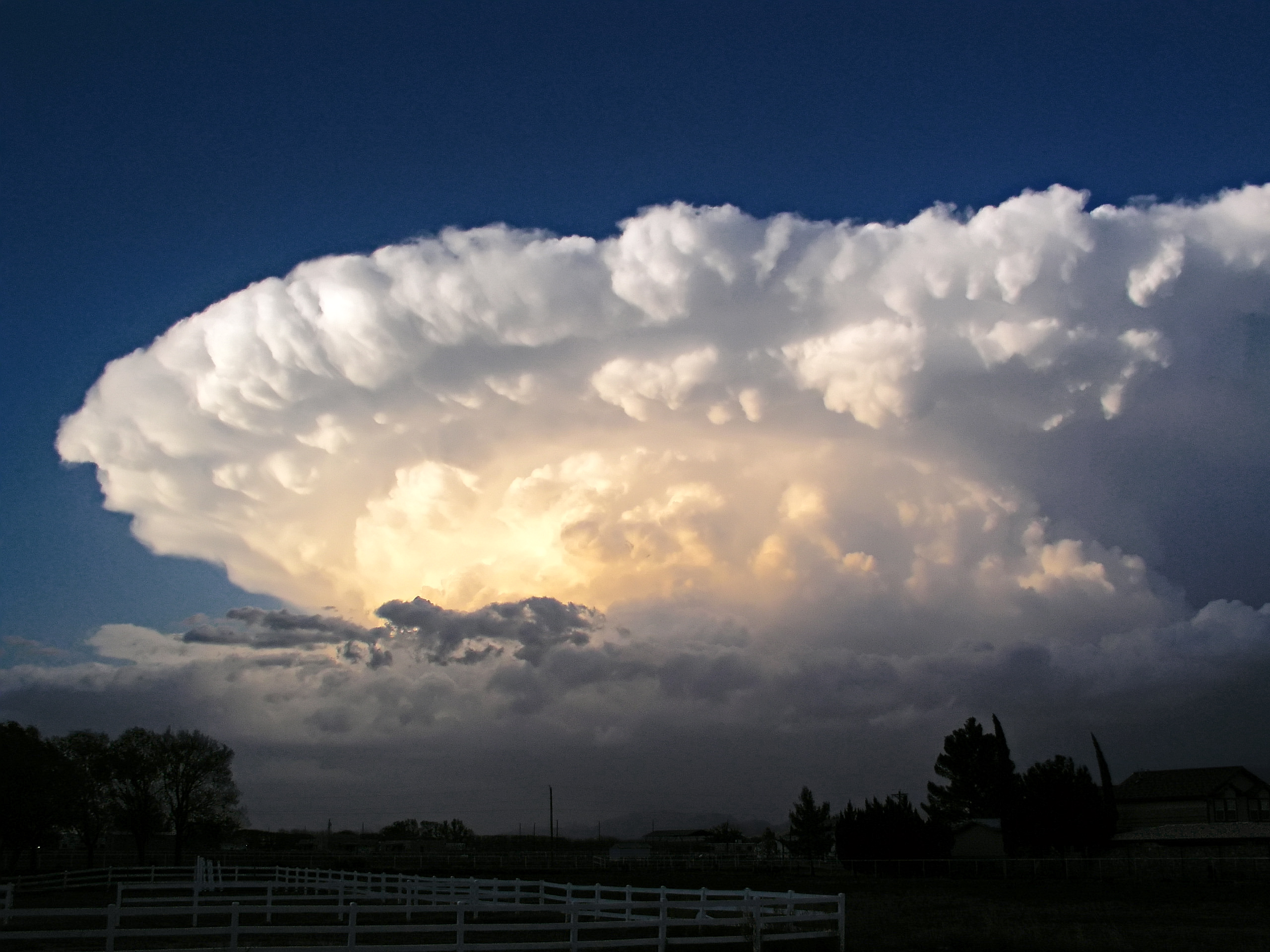
Strong wind shear in the high troposphere forms the anvil-shaped top of this mature cumulonimbus cloud, or thunderstorm.

Severe thunderstorms, which can spawn tornadoes and hailstorms, require wind shear to organize the storm in such a way as to maintain the thunderstorm for a longer period. This occurs as the storm's inflow becomes separated from its rain-cooled outflow. An increasing nocturnal, or overnight, low-level jet can increase the severe weather potential by increasing the vertical wind shear through the troposphere. Thunderstorms in an atmosphere with virtually no vertical wind shear weaken as soon as they send out an outflow boundary in all directions, which then quickly cuts off its inflow of relatively warm, moist air and causes the thunderstorm to dissipate.

=== Planetary boundary layer ===
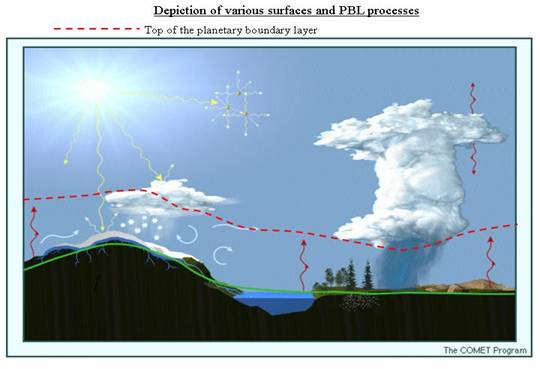
Depiction of where the planetary boundary layer lies on a sunny day

The atmospheric effect of surface friction with winds aloft forces surface winds to slow and back counterclockwise near the surface of Earth blowing inward across isobars (lines of equal pressure) when compared to the winds in frictionless flow well above Earth's surface. This layer where friction slows and changes the wind is known as the planetary boundary layer, sometimes the Ekman layer, and it is thickest during the day and thinnest at night. Daytime heating thickens the boundary layer as winds at the surface become increasingly mixed with winds aloft due to insolation, or solar heating. Radiative cooling overnight further enhances wind decoupling between the winds at the surface and the winds above the boundary layer by calming the surface wind which increases wind shear. These wind changes force wind shear between the boundary layer and the wind aloft and are most emphasized at night.

==== Effects on flight ====
===== Gliding =====
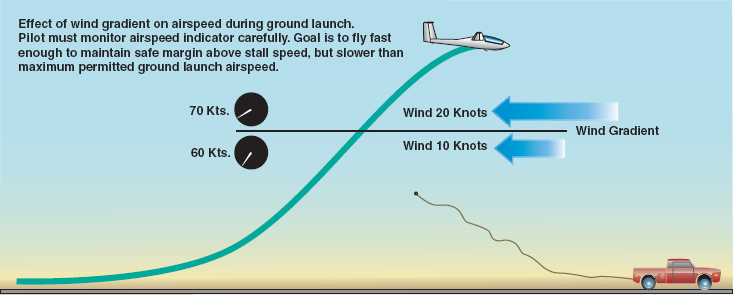
Glider ground launch affected by wind shear

In gliding, wind gradients just above the surface affect the takeoff and landing phases of the flight of a glider. Wind gradient can have a noticeable effect on ground launches, also known as winch launches or wire launches. If the wind gradient is significant or sudden, or both, and the pilot maintains the same pitch attitude, the indicated airspeed will increase, possibly exceeding the maximum ground launch tow speed. The pilot must adjust the airspeed to deal with the effect of the gradient.

When landing, wind shear is also a hazard, particularly when the winds are strong. As the glider descends through the wind gradient on final approach to landing, airspeed decreases while sink rate increases, and there is insufficient time to accelerate prior to ground contact. The pilot must anticipate the wind gradient and use a higher approach speed to compensate for it.

Wind shear is also a hazard for aircraft making steep turns near the ground. It is a particular problem for gliders which have a relatively long wingspan, which exposes them to a greater wind speed difference for a given bank angle. The different airspeed experienced by each wing tip can result in an aerodynamic stall on one wing, causing a loss of control accident.

===== Parachuting =====
Wind shear or wind gradients are a threat to parachutists, particularly to BASE jumping and wingsuit flying. Skydivers have been pushed off of their course by sudden shifts in wind direction and speed, and have collided with bridges, cliffsides, trees, other skydivers, the ground, and other obstacles. Skydivers routinely make adjustments to the position of their open canopies to compensate for changes in direction while making landings to prevent accidents such as canopy collisions and canopy inversion.

===== Soaring =====
Soaring related to wind shear, also called dynamic soaring, is a technique used by soaring birds like albatrosses, who can maintain flight without wing flapping. If the wind shear is of sufficient magnitude, a bird can climb into the wind gradient, trading ground speed for height, while maintaining airspeed. By then turning downwind, and diving through the wind gradient, they can also gain energy. It has also been used by glider pilots on rare occasions.

Wind shear can also produce wave. This occurs when an atmospheric inversion separates two layers with a marked difference in wind direction. If the wind encounters distortions in the inversion layer caused by thermals coming up from below, it will produce significant shear waves that can be used for soaring.

===== Impact on passenger aircraft =====
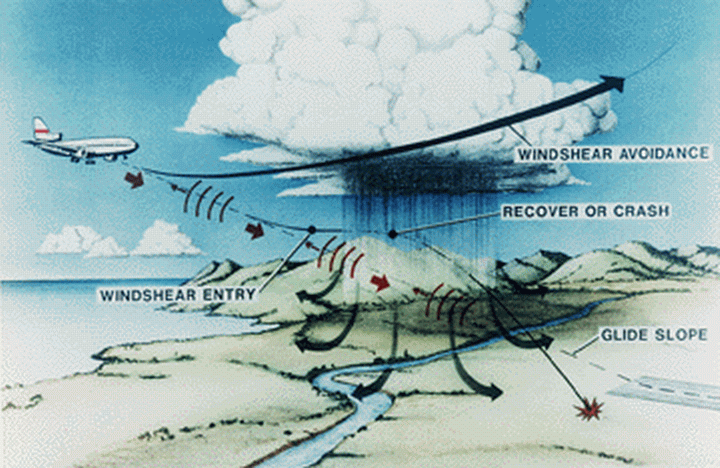
Effect of wind shear on aircraft trajectory. Note how merely correcting for the initial gust front can have dire consequences.

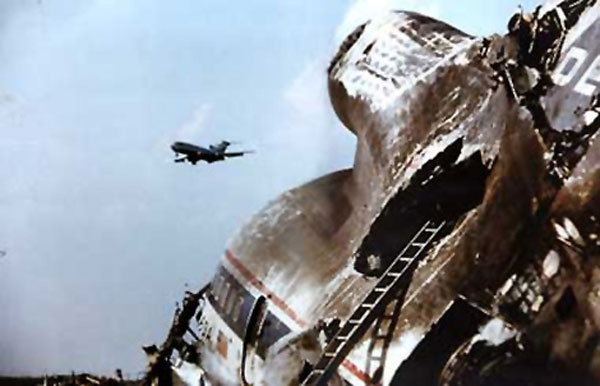
Wreckage of Delta Air Lines Flight 191 tail section after a microburst slammed the aircraft into the ground. Another aircraft can be seen flying in the background past the crash scene.

Windshear can be extremely dangerous for aircraft, especially during takeoff and landing. Sudden changes in wind velocity can cause rapid decreases in airspeed, leading to the aircraft being unable to maintain altitude. Windshear has been responsible for several deadly accidents, including Eastern Air Lines Flight 66, Pan Am Flight 759, Delta Air Lines Flight 191, and USAir Flight 1016.

Windshear can be detected using Doppler radar. Airports can be fitted with low-level windshear alert systems or Terminal Doppler Weather Radar, and aircraft can be fitted with airborne wind shear detection and alert systems. Following the 1985 crash of Delta Air Lines Flight 191, in 1988 the U.S. Federal Aviation Administration mandated that all commercial aircraft have airborne wind shear detection and alert systems by 1993. The installation of high-resolution Terminal Doppler Weather Radar stations at many U.S. airports that are commonly affected by windshear has further aided the ability of pilots and ground controllers to avoid wind shear conditions.

==== Sailing ====
Wind shear affects sailboats in motion by presenting a different wind speed and direction at different heights along the mast. The effect of low-level wind shear can be factored into the selection of sail twist in the sail design, but this can be difficult to predict since wind shear may vary widely in different weather conditions. Sailors may also adjust the trim of the sail to account for low-level wind shear, for example using a boom vang.

==== Sound propagation ====
Wind shear can have a pronounced effect upon sound propagation in the lower atmosphere, where waves can be "bent" by refraction phenomenon. The audibility of sounds from distant sources, such as thunder or gunshots, is very dependent on the amount of shear. The result of these differing sound levels is key in noise pollution considerations, for example from roadway noise and aircraft noise, and must be considered in the design of noise barriers. This phenomenon was first applied to the field of noise pollution study in the 1960s, contributing to the design of urban highways as well as noise barriers.

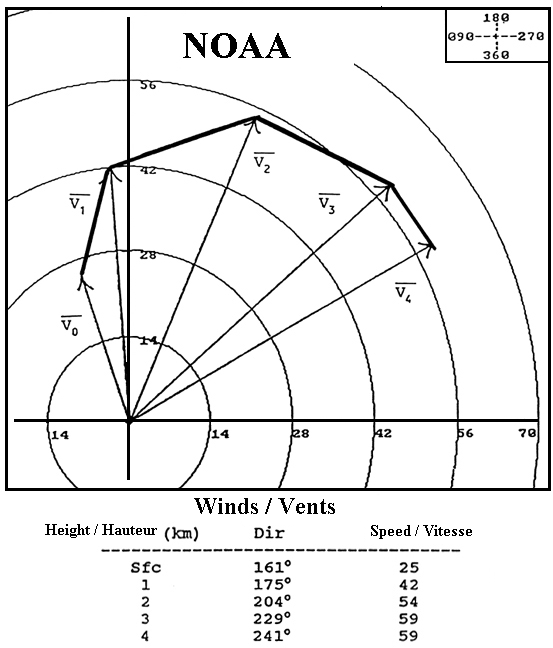
Hodograph plot of wind vectors at various heights in the troposphere. Meteorologists can use this plot to evaluate vertical wind shear in weather forecasting. (Source: NOAA)

The speed of sound varies with temperature. Since temperature and sound velocity normally decrease with increasing altitude, sound is refracted upward, away from listeners on the ground, producing an acoustic shadow at some distance from the source. In 1862, during the American Civil War Battle of Iuka, an acoustic shadow, believed to have been enhanced by a northeast wind, kept two divisions of Union soldiers out of the battle, because they could not hear the sounds of battle only six miles downwind.

==== Effects on architecture ====
Wind engineering is a field of engineering devoted to the analysis of wind effects on the natural and built environment. It includes strong winds which may cause discomfort as well as extreme winds such as tornadoes, hurricanes, and storms which may cause widespread destruction. Wind engineering draws upon meteorology, aerodynamics, and several specialist engineering disciplines. The tools used include climate models, atmospheric boundary layer wind tunnels, and numerical models. It involves, among other topics, how wind impacting buildings must be accounted for in engineering.

Wind turbines are affected by wind shear. Vertical wind-speed profiles result in different wind speeds at the blades nearest to the ground level compared to those at the top of blade travel, and this, in turn, affects the turbine operation. This low-level wind shear can cause a large bending moment in the shaft of a two-bladed turbine when the blades are vertical. The reduced wind shear over water means shorter and less expensive wind turbine towers can be used in shallow seas.

== See also ==
- Aviation safety
- Low-level windshear alert system
- Sailing
- Cumulonimbus and aviation
