= Pan Am Flight 759 =

1982 aviation accident in Louisiana

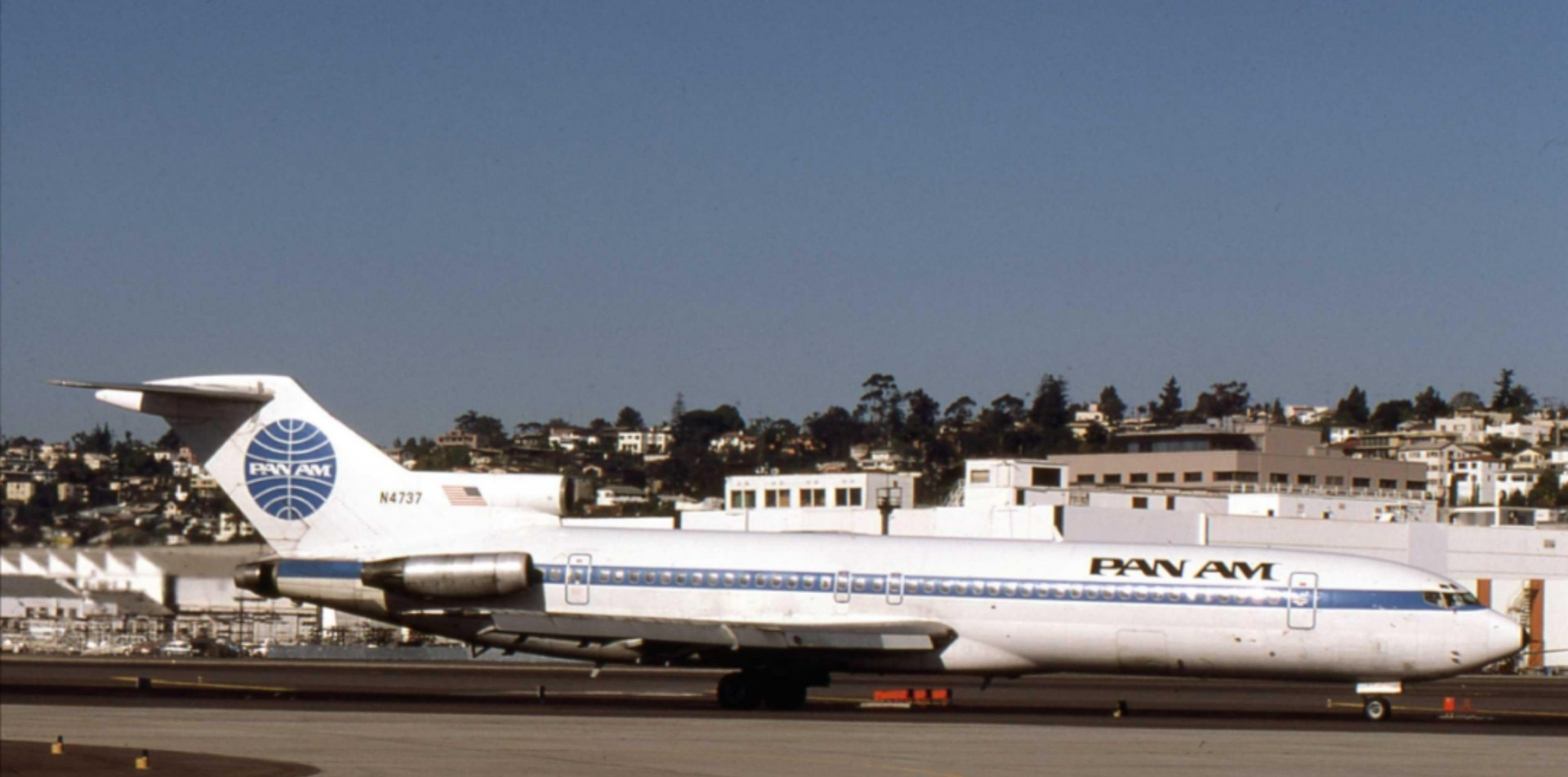
- N4737, the aircraft involved in the accident, pictured in May 1982

Accident
- Date: July 9, 1982
- Summary: Crashed on takeoff due to microburst-induced wind shear
- Site: Near New Orleans International Airport, Kenner, Louisiana, United States; 29°59′15″N 90°14′08″W
- Total fatalities: 153
- Total injuries: 4

Aircraft
- Aircraft type: Boeing 727-235
- Aircraft name: Clipper Defiance
- Operator: Pan American World Airways
- IATA flight No.: PA759
- ICAO flight No.: PAA759
- Call sign: CLIPPER 759
- Registration: N4737
- Flight origin: Miami International Airport
- 1st stopover: New Orleans Int'l Airport
- Last stopover: McCarran Int'l Airport
- Destination: San Diego Int'l Airport
- Occupants: 145
- Passengers: 138
- Crew: 7
- Fatalities: 145
- Survivors: 0

Ground casualties
- Ground fatalities: 8
- Ground injuries: 4

Pan Am Flight 759 was a regularly scheduled domestic passenger flight from Miami to San Diego, with en route stops in New Orleans and Las Vegas. On July 9, 1982, the Boeing 727 flying this route crashed in the New Orleans suburb of Kenner after being forced down by a microburst shortly after takeoff. All 145 on board, as well as eight people on the ground, were killed.

== Aircraft and crew ==
The aircraft involved, a 14-year-old Boeing 727-235, registration N4737, construction number 19457/518, was delivered to National Airlines on January 31, 1968. The aircraft was powered by three Pratt & Whitney JT8D-7B turbofan engines, and was renamed from 37 Susan/Erica to Clipper Defiance after National was merged with Pan Am.

At the time of accident, the aircraft was carrying 137 passengers and one non-revenue passenger in the cockpit jumpseat, along with a crew of seven. The captain was 45-year-old Kenneth L. McCullers, who had 11,727 flying hours, including 10,595 hours on the Boeing 727. McCullers was described by others as an "above average" pilot, who was "comfortable" to fly with because of his excellent judgment and ability to exercise command. The First Officer was 32-year-old Donald G. Pierce, who had 6,127 flying hours, including 3,914 hours on the Boeing 727. Pierce was described by other captains as a conscientious pilot with excellent knowledge of aircraft systems and company flight procedures and techniques. The flight engineer was 60-year-old Leo B. Noone, who had 19,904 flying hours, including 10,508 hours on the Boeing 727. All three flight crew, including the captain, the first officer and the second officer, were reported having no sleep or health problems, and had passed all proficiency checks without issues.

== Accident ==
The weather forecast issued at 07:40 on July 9 by the New Orleans National Meteorological Center contained thunderstorms, possible severe turbulence, icing, and wind shear. The weather chart at 18:00 local time identified a high pressure system located 60 nautical miles (69 mi; 110 km) off the Louisiana coast. No fronts or low pressure areas were within 100 nautical miles (120 mi; 190 km) of the airport. The forecast between 1200 and 2200 indicated "scattered clouds, variable to broken clouds at 3,000 feet (910 m), thunderstorms, and moderate rain showers." According to the NWS (National Weather Service), there were no severe weather warnings for the time and area of the accident.

Flight 759 began its takeoff from Runway 10 at the New Orleans International Airport (now Louis Armstrong New Orleans International), in Kenner, Louisiana at 16:07:57 central daylight time, bound for Las Vegas, Nevada. At the time of Flight 759's takeoff, there were thunderstorms over the east of the airport and east-northeast of the departure end of runway 10. The winds were reported to be "gusty and swirling." First Officer Pierce was the pilot flying and Captain McCullers was the pilot monitoring, as recorded on the aircraft's cockpit voice recorder (CVR):

Abridged communication between Pan Am 759 and the controllers, and among the Pan Am flight crew
# = Nonpertinent word; * = Unintelligible word; () = Questionable text; (( )) = Commentary; --- = pause; Shading = Radio communication; PHM 66K = Other aircraft; AL 404 = Other aircraft
Time	Source	Content
16:07:56	Flight engineer	Takeoff (checks all done)
16:07:59	First officer	Takeoff thrust
16:08:00	PHM 66K	Moisant tower six six kilo.
16:08:02	PHM 66K	Six six kilo traffic is a helicopter landing at the west pad.
16:08:04	First officer	(Need the) wipers
16:08:06	((Sound of windshield wipers begins and continues to end of tape))	
16:08:06	PHM 66K	This is petroleum six six kilo lifting the ah west pad on a special VFR.
16:08:14	Tower	Zero three bravo traffic is departing the west pad, do you have him in sight?
16:08:16	PHM 66K	I got him in sight, I'll turn inside of him.
16:08:16	((Thump sound similar to runway bump))	
16:08:16	Voice unidentified	(Eighty knots)
16:08:19	Tower	Okay thank you.
16:08:20	First officer	Sixty * is ready on number one.
16:08:25	N1MT	And ah thirty one mike tango is ready.
16:08:27	((Click)) ((Windshield wiper speed Increases))	
16:08:28	((Thump sound similar to runway bump))	
16:08:28	Tower	Thirty one mike tango hold short.
16:08:30	AL 404	And U. S. four oh four is ready.
16:08:33	Tower	U.S. Air four oh four roger.
16:08:33	Captain	V_{R}
16:08:34	((Clunk sound attributed to nose strut topping))	
16:08:41	Captain	Positive climb
16:08:42	First officer	Gear up
16:08:43	Captain	(V two)
16:08:45	Captain	(Come on back you're sinking Don - come on back)
16:08:48	((Thump sound attributed to nose gear striking up locks))	
16:08:45	Tower	Clipper seven fifty nine contact departure one two zero point six so long.
16:08:57	Ground Proximity Warning System	((Sound of GPWS)) Whoop whoop pull up whoop
16:09:00	((Sound identified as first impact))	
16:09:02	Voice unidentified	#
16:09:03	((Click))	
16:09:04	((Sound of impact))	
16:09:05	((Sound of final impact))	
16:09:05	((Sound attributed to end of tape))	

Flight 759 lifted off the runway, climbed to an altitude of between 95 and 150 feet (29 and 46 m), and then began to descend. About 2,376 feet (724 m) from the end of runway, the aircraft struck a line of trees at an altitude of about 50 feet (15 m). The aircraft continued descending for another 2,234 feet (681 m), hitting trees and houses. At 16:09:01, the aircraft crashed into the residential area of Kenner, about 4,610 feet (1,410 m) from the end of the runway. Flight 759 initially struck a house at 1624 Fairway Street, destroying it. The plane broke apart as it went across two and a half blocks, tearing diagonally across Hudson Street, 17th Street, and Taylor Street.

The aircraft was destroyed by the impact, explosion, and subsequent ground fire. A total of 153 people were killed (all 145 passengers and crew on board and 8 on the ground). Another four people on the ground sustained injuries. In one of the destroyed houses, a 16-month-old baby girl was discovered in a crib covered with debris that protected her from the flames, sustaining only minor burns. The child's mother and 4-year-old sister were killed; the father was at work when the accident occurred. In all, six houses were demolished, while five houses sustained significant damage. Most of the homes have since been rebuilt.

== Investigation ==
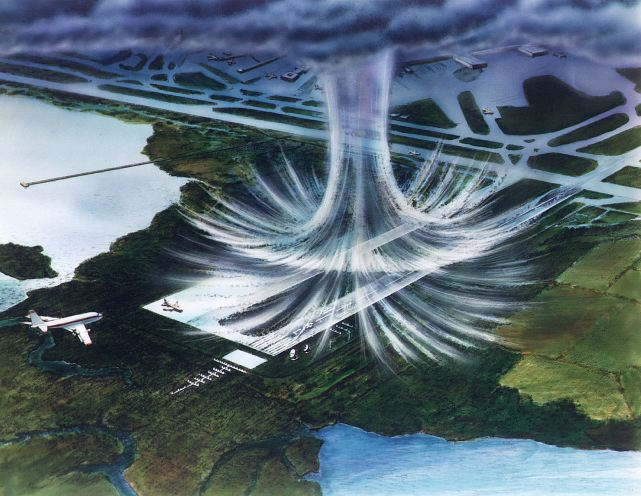
Illustration of a microburst. The air moves in a downward motion until it hits ground level. It then spreads outward in all directions.

The National Transportation Safety Board (NTSB) determined that the probable cause of the accident was the aircraft's encounter with microburst-induced wind shear during the liftoff, which imposed a downdraft and a decreasing headwind, the effects of which the pilot would have had difficulty recognizing and reacting to in time for the aircraft's descent to be stopped before its impact with trees. Contributing to the accident was the limited capability of then current wind shear detection technology. The investigation noted the failure of the US Government to "put out proper weather information that day and to maintain wind shear detection devices at the airport." The New York Times reported that:

According to witnesses, a wind shear alert was mentioned on New Orleans Airport radio frequencies on July 9, before Flight 759 took off. But the flight crew had been briefed with a recorded weather advisory that was two hours old, though airport routine is for hourly recordings of weather information. There were no procedures at the airport for advising flight crews that updated weather announcements were available.

As a result, millions of dollars were paid out as compensation to various families affected by the crash. Flight 759, along with Delta Air Lines Flight 191 which crashed due to similar circumstances three years later, led to the development of the Airborne wind shear detection and alert system and the Federal Aviation Administration mandate to install windshear detection systems at airports and on board aircraft in the U.S. by 1993.

== Victims ==
=== Nationalities of passenger, crew and ground fatalities ===
Nationality	Passengers	Crew	Ground	Total
Australia	2	-	-	2
Brazil	7	-	-	7
Canada	6	-	-	6 (Note: In the list of victims provided by the airline to United Press International, six of the passengers' nationalities were omitted. One of these individuals was listed by the NTSB in their report on the accident as a non-revenued passenger occupying the cockpit's jumpseat.)
Costa Rica	4	-	-	4
France	4	-	-	4
West Germany	5	-	-	5
Hong Kong	4	-	-	4
Jamaica	1	-	-	1
Mexico	3	-	-	3
Panama	1	-	-	1
Puerto Rico	3	-	-	3
Switzerland	4	-	-	4
Uruguay	11	-	-	11
United States	80	7	8	95{
Venezuela	1	-	-	1
Yugoslavia	2	-	-	2
Total	138	7	8	153 (Note: The NTSB report stated that "the coroner of Jefferson Parish, Louisiana, issued a 'Certificate of Fatal Death' for a 7 1/2 month fetus which was not included in the final total.")

Kenyan born British Ballet dancer Daphne Dale was among the victims, her nationality being officially listed as American, having taken citizenship upon marriage to her first husband. Her second husband, also American, died with her.

A memorial to the accident is located at Our Lady of Perpetual Help Church in Kenner, Louisiana.

== Media ==
A metal band from Kenner, "Killer Elite", recorded and made a song called "The Killer" in 1988 about this crash.

Royd Anderson wrote and produced a documentary on the crash in 2012.

Australian radio presenter Peter Goers, whose parents died in the crash, wrote a book about the aftermath in 2023.

== See also ==
- Delta Air Lines Flight 191
- Eastern Air Lines Flight 66
- Martinair Flight 495
- USAir Flight 1016
