= Low-level windshear alert system =

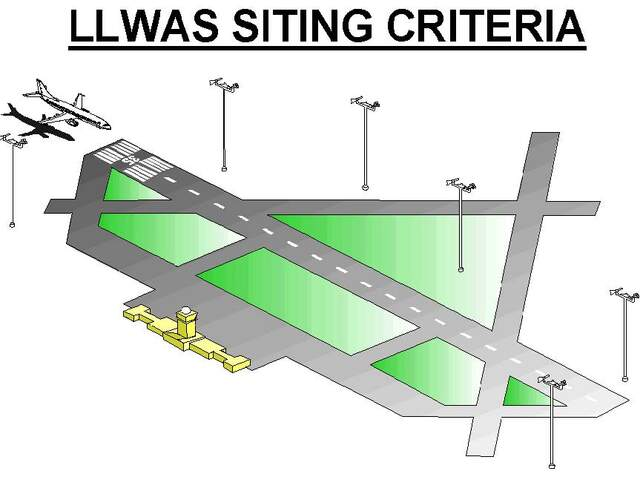
LLWAS anemometers along a runway

A low-level windshear alert system (LLWAS) measures average surface wind speed and direction using a network of remote sensor stations, situated near runways and along approach or departure corridors at an airport. Wind shear is the generic term for wind differences over an operationally short distance (in relation to flight) which encompass meteorological phenomena including gust fronts, microbursts, vertical shear, and derechos.

== Background ==
LLWAS compares results over its operating area to determine whether calm, steady winds, wind shifts (in relation to runways), wind gusts, divergent winds, sustained divergent winds (indicative of shear), or strong and sustained divergent winds (indicative of microbursts) are observed. A LLWAS master station polls each remote station every system cycle (nominally every ten seconds) and provides prevailing airport wind averages, runway specific winds, gusts, may set new wind shear alerts or microburst alerts and reset countdown timers of elapsed time since the last alert. By airline rules, pilots must avoid microbursts if warnings are issued by an automated wind shear detection system, and must wait until a safe time interval passes, to assure departure or landing conditions are safe for the performance of the airframe. Pilots may decide whether to land (or conduct a missed approach) after wind shear alerts are issued. LLWAS wind shear alerts are defined as wind speed gain or loss of between 20 and 30 knots aligned with the active runway direction. "Low level" refers to altitudes of 2,000 ft (610 m) or less above ground level (AGL). Arriving aircraft on descent, generally within six nautical miles of touchdown will fly within this low level, maintaining a glide slope and may lack recovery altitude sufficient to avoid a stall or flight-into-terrain if caught unaware by a microburst. LLWAS microburst alerts are issued for greater than 30 knot loss of airspeed at the runway or within three nautical miles of approach or two nautical miles of departure. Microbursts in excess of 110 knots have been observed.

Each LLWAS equipped airport may have as few as six or as many as thirty-two remote stations. Each remote station uses a 150 ft (46 m) tall pole with anemometer and radio-telecommunication equipment mounted on a lowerable ring. Remote station wind measurements are transmitted to a master station at the Air Traffic Control Tower (ATCT), which polls the remote stations, runs wind shear and gust front algorithms, and generates warnings when windshear or microburst conditions are detected. Current observations and warnings are displayed for approach controllers in the terminal radar approach control facility (TRACON) and for local and ground controllers in the air traffic control tower.

Air traffic controller (ATC) users at local, ground and departure positions in the ATCT relay the LLWAS runway specific alerts to pilots via voice radio communication. Recent wind shear alerts may also feature in radio broadcasts by the automated terminal information system (ATIS). LLWAS wind shear and microburst alerts assist pilots during busy times on final approach and on departure, often when heavy traffic, low ceilings, obstructions to vision, and moderate to heavy precipitation add to the difficulty in determining in just a few seconds whether mounting wind and weather hazards should be risked or avoided.

== Related activities in the United States ==
The original LLWAS system (LLWAS I) was developed by the Federal Aviation Administration (FAA) in 1976 in response to the 1975 Eastern Air Lines Flight 66 windshear accident in New York and the findings of Project NIMROD by Ted Fujita. LLWAS I used a center field anemometer along with five pole mounted anemometers sited around the periphery of a single runway. It was installed at 110 FAA towered airports between 1977 and 1987. Windshear was detected using a simple vector difference algorithm, triggering an alarm when the magnitude of the difference vector between the center field anemometer and any of the five remotes exceeded 15 knots. The LLWAS II deployment included software and hardware upgrades to the existing LLWAS I to improve the windshear detection and reduce false alarms. Between 1988 and 1991, all of the LLWAS I systems were upgraded to be LLWAS II compliant. Windshear deployment studies conducted from 1989 through 1994 determined at which LLWAS-II sites weather exposure justified upgrade to a weather radar (Terminal Doppler Weather Radar (TDWR) or Weather Systems Processor (WSP)) an LLWAS Network Expansion (LLWAS-NE) or LLWAS-Relocate/Sustain (LLWAS-RS) upgrade, singly or in combination. By 2005 all LLWAS-II had been decommissioned for one of these replacement wind shear detection systems or for two in combination.

The LLWAS-NE added the ability to cover more than a single runway, using up to 32 remote stations to provide runway specific alerts for parallel and crossing runways at ten large airports in combination with TDWR. The LLWAS-RS further upgrades service at 40 remaining LLWAS-2 operating sites (not justified for a radar solution) to employ LLWAS-NE algorithms and extend service life by 20 years, in part by adding ultrasonic anemometers with no moving parts. The LLWAS-RS program began in response to the National Transportation Safety Board (NTSB) investigation of the USAir Flight 1016 accident at Charlotte, North Carolina, in 1994. From that accident, a determination was made that LLWAS-II must regain and retain its original capability, often degraded by tree growth and airport construction such as hangars that obstruct or deflect wind near LLWAS remote station sensors.

== See also ==
- Index of aviation articles
- Terminal Doppler Weather Radar
- Airborne wind shear detection and alert system
- Center Weather Service Unit
- NEXRAD
