= 1950 Bahrain Air France Douglas DC-4 crashes =

Pair of aircraft accidents in Bahrain

1950 Air France Douglas DC-4 crash (F-BBDE)
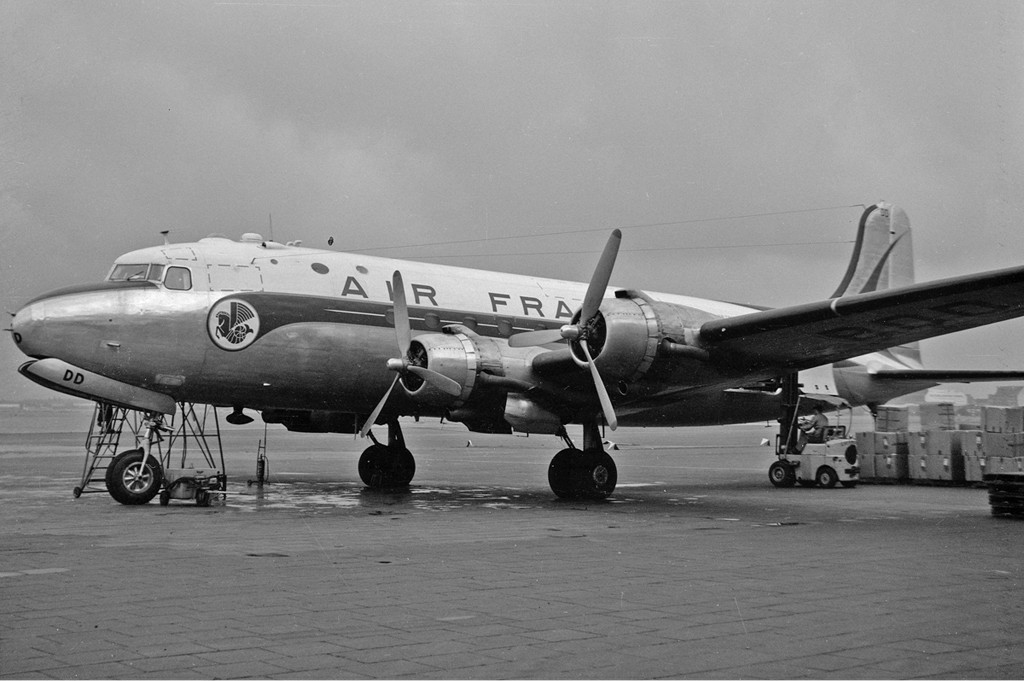
- An Air France Douglas DC-4 similar to the aircraft involved

Accident
- Date: 12 June 1950
- Site: In the sea south-east of Bahrain International Airport, Bahrain
- Total fatalities: 86
- Total survivors: 19

Aircraft
- Aircraft type: Douglas DC-4-1009
- Aircraft name: Ciel de Picardie
- Operator: Air France
- Registration: F-BBDE
- Flight origin: Saigon, Vietnam
- 1st stopover: Karachi International Airport, Pakistan
- Last stopover: Bahrain International Airport, Bahrain
- Destination: Paris, France
- Passengers: 44
- Crew: 8
- Fatalities: 46
- Survivors: 6

1950 Air France Douglas DC-4 crash (F-BBDM)
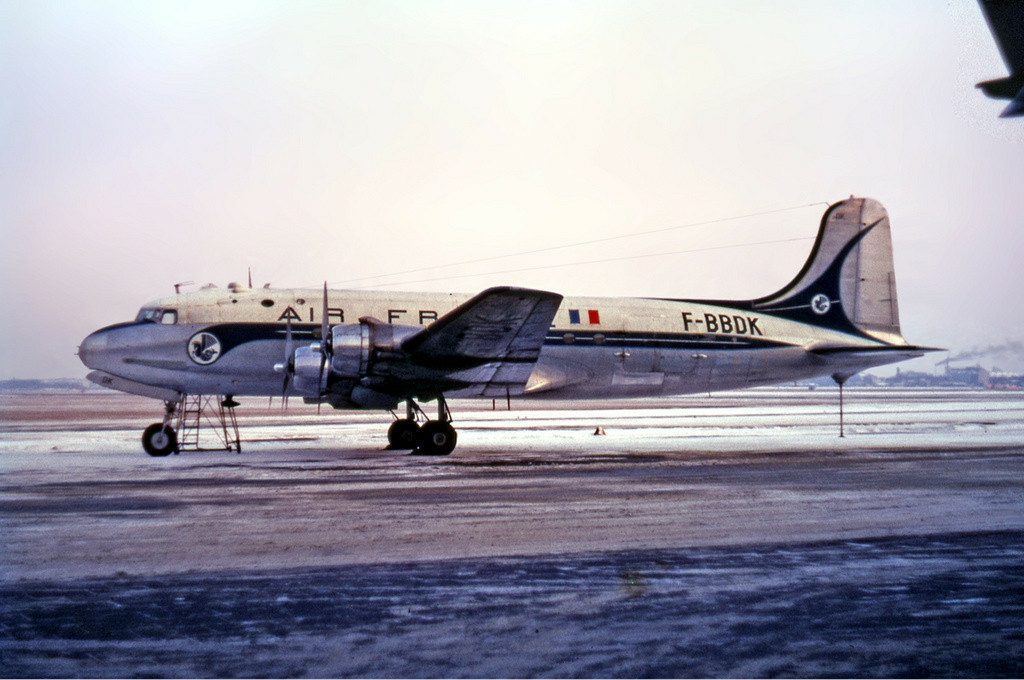
- An Air France Douglas DC-4 similar to the aircraft that crashed

Accident
- Date: 14 June 1950
- Site: In the sea south-east of Bahrain International Airport, Bahrain

Aircraft
- Aircraft type: Douglas DC-4-1009
- Aircraft name: Ciel de Gascogne
- Operator: Air France
- Registration: F-BBDM
- Flight origin: Saigon, Vietnam
- 1st stopover: Karachi International Airport, Pakistan
- Last stopover: Bahrain International Airport, Bahrain
- Destination: Paris, France
- Passengers: 45
- Crew: 8
- Fatalities: 40
- Survivors: 13

Two Air France Douglas DC-4 aircraft crashed two days apart in June 1950 within a few miles of each other and under similar circumstances. These two accidents, on 12 and 14 June, occurred while the aircraft were operating the same route from Saigon to Paris. Both aircraft had stopped at Karachi Airport and crashed into the sea on approach to Bahrain. A total of 86 passengers and crew were killed: 46 on June 12 and 40 on June 14. There were a total of 19 survivors: 6 on June 12 and 13 on June 14.

== Accident of 12 June 1950 ==
Douglas DC-4 Ciel de Picardie (F-BBDE) was on a scheduled flight from Saigon to Paris and had departed at 16:05 from a stopover at Karachi for another stopover at Bahrain. At 20:42 it called Bahrain approach reporting at 6,500 feet (2,000 m) and asking for clearance to descend. It was given permission to descend to 2,000 feet (600 m). The aircraft overflew the airfield at about 1,000 feet (300 m) and at 21:13 reported as being on the down wind leg of the approach, the tower passed the wind speed and direction. At 21:15 the aircraft reported "finals" and the tower gave permission to land on Runway 29. The aircraft hit the water and crashed. After an eight-hour search the aircraft was found in 12 feet (4 m) of water 3.3 miles (5.3 km) from the end of the runway; 46 of the 52 occupants had been killed. Three survivors were found soon after the accident by a ship and three others were rescued by helicopter after eight hours in the water. All on board were French other than one stateless person. The French writer François-Jean Armorin was on board. This crash was the deadliest since the Llandow air disaster, three months earlier, which killed 80.

== Accident of 14 June 1950 ==
Two days later, Douglas DC-4 Ciel de Gascogne (F-BBDM) was flying the same scheduled route from Saigon to Paris and as before had departed its Karachi stopover (this time at 16:43) for the stopover at Bahrain. At 21:41 it called Bahrain to report as being overhead. At 21:52 the aircraft reported "Procedure Turn" and the tower gave permission to land. The aircraft hit the water and crashed within 1 mile (1.6 km) of the previous accident. After a search a ship reported picking up survivors at 02:00; 40 of the 53 occupants had been killed. Most of the passengers and the crew were French with two Vietnamese and two Chinese. At least 13 of the passengers were children.

The New York Times reported the incident as so:

"PARIS, Thursday, 15 June—A second four-engine Air France airliner with forty-five passengers aboard crashed into the Persian Gulf last night near Bahrein Island, at approximately the same place where forty-six persons were lost two days before in another Air France crash. First reports said eleven persons so far had been saved in the second crash. Both aircraft were en route from Saigon, Indo-China, to Paris. Last night's crash was the third French air disaster in three days, sixteen men being lost in a Madagascar flight." ("New York Times," 15 June 1950)

== Aircraft ==
The aircraft were both Douglas DC-4 airliners powered by four Pratt & Whitney R-2000 Twin Wasp radial piston engines and able to carry up to 86 passengers.

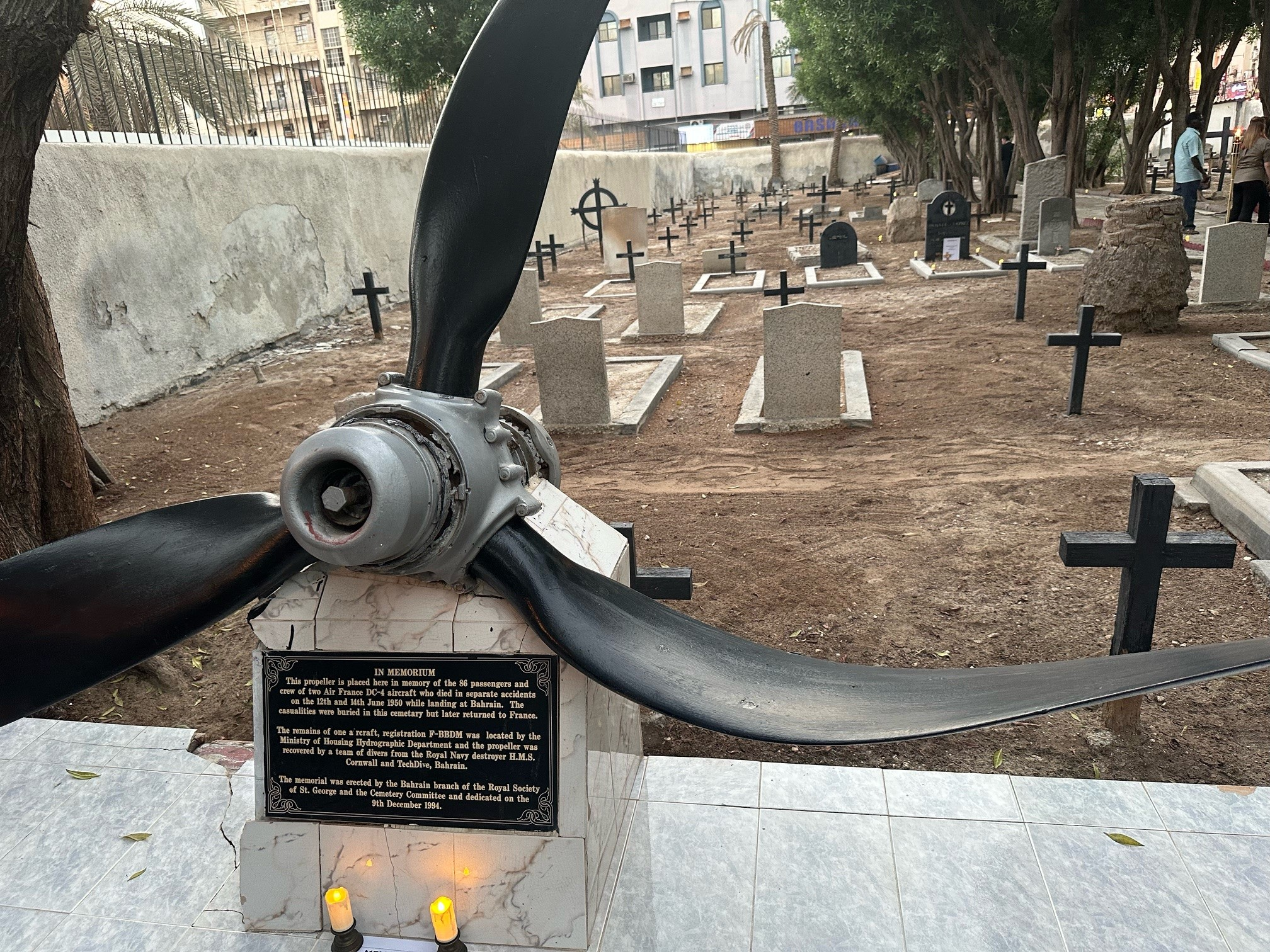
- Memorial located in Manama's Christian cemetery
  Aircraft F-BBDE, Ciel de Picardie was a Douglas DC-4-1009 that first flew on 3 June 1946 and had flown 8,128 hours by the time of the accident.
- Aircraft F-BBDM, Ciel de Gascogne was a Douglas DC-4-1009 that first flew on 27 June 1946 and had flown 8,705 hours by the time of the accident.

== 1950 investigation ==
A special commission of inquiry arrived on 15 June in Bahrain to investigate the first accident, it was then directed to investigate both accidents. The commission banned all French aircraft from landing at night while the cause was being investigated. The manager of Air France in the Far East said there were similarities between the two accidents, both having taken place at the same time of day in bad atmospheric conditions.

The probable cause determined by the inquiry for the 12 June 1950 accident was that the pilot-in-command did not keep an accurate check of his altitude and rate of descent during the timed approach procedure, thus allowing his aircraft to fly into the surface of the sea. The possibility that the pilot-in-command was feeling the effects of fatigue could not be ruled out.

The probable cause determined by the inquiry for the 14 June 1950 accident was a failure of the pilot-in-command to adapt the timed approach procedure to the prevailing conditions and having descended to 300 feet (90 m), the pilot-in-command did not take the necessary steps to maintain this altitude until such time as the runway lights became visible.

The investigation into both accidents recommended that consideration be given to equipping Bahrain Airport with radio landing aids and with suitable runway approach lights.

Following the discovery of the wreckage of F-BBDM on the seabed in 1994, a re-investigation of both accidents cast doubt on the findings of the 1950 investigation.

== Wreckage discovery and re-investigation ==
In 1994 a hydrographic survey of the area to the east of Muhurraq Island off the end of the runway located a wing of an aircraft subsequently identified as that of DC-4 F-BBDM. A seabed inspection of the area located two of the Pratt & Whitney radial engines and three bent propellers together with assorted aircraft debris consisting of part of the tailplane, electric wiring, small passenger items and broken bottles. The Christian Cemetery Committee responsible for the maintenance of the Old Christian Cemetery in which the 86 casualties had originally been interred approved the idea of a permanent memorial. A joint venture between the Bahrain-based diving company TECHDIVE and Royal Navy divers recovered the least damaged propeller and after sandblasting and painting, it was mounted in the cemetery. In December the memorial was formally dedicated by the French Ambassador, various church dignitaries and those involved in its recovery.

After the 1994 discovery, two independent researchers, brothers Kevin Patience and Colin Patience, investigated the matter. According to them, the primary cause was the extreme weather on the two nights. They argued a microburst was most likely at fault for each crash, based on contemporary weather reports.
