= 1956 Kano Airport BOAC Argonaut crash =

Airplane crash incident

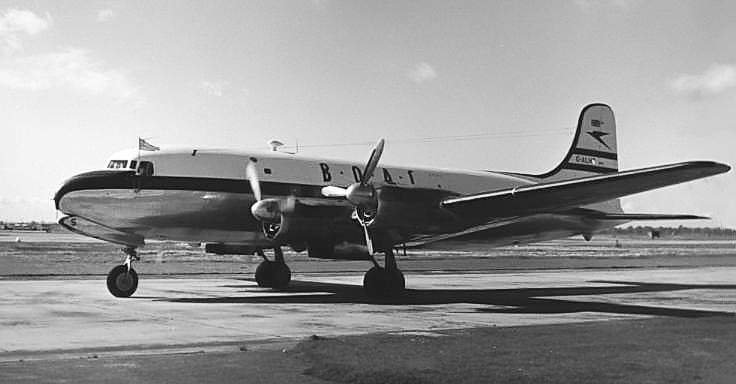
- G-ALHS, sister aircraft to the one involved in the accident

Accident
- Date: 24 June 1956
- Summary: Crashed on take-off following encounter with microburst
- Site: Kano Airport, Federation of Nigeria; 12.046891°N 8.51809°E

Aircraft
- Aircraft type: Canadair C-4 Argonaut
- Aircraft name: Argo
- Operator: British Overseas Airways Corporation
- Registration: G-ALHE
- Flight origin: Kano Airport, Federation of Nigeria
- Destination: Tripoli International Airport (Idris Airport), Kingdom of Libya
- Occupants: 45
- Passengers: 38
- Crew: 7
- Fatalities: 32
- Injuries: 4
- Survivors: 13

On 24 June 1956, a British Overseas Airways Corporation (BOAC) four-engined Canadair C-4 Argonaut airliner crashed into a tree on departure from Kano Airport in the Federation of Nigeria, three crew and 29 passengers were killed.

== Aircraft ==
The aircraft was a Canadair C-4 Argonaut operated by British Overseas Airways Corporation. Its registration number was G-ALHE and its MSN was 151. The engine model was a Rolls-Royce Merlin 622.

== Crash ==
At 17:21 the Argonaut departed Runway 25 at Kano Airport on the way to Tripoli in Libya. The flight was from Lagos to London and had made a scheduled stop at Kano. It was raining as the aircraft reached 250 feet (76 m) when the aircraft began to lose height. The pilot applied full power but the aircraft continued to descend until it hit a tree about 1 1/2 miles (2.4 km) from the end of the runway. Three of the seven crew members and 29 of the 38 passengers were killed in the crash, two crew and two passengers were seriously injured.

== Investigation ==
A team from the British Ministry of Transport and Civil Aviation and BOAC flew out from London on 25 June in a chartered Canadair Argonaut to help in the investigation. The Nigerian investigation team of four was led by the Director of Civil Aviation.

=== Inquiry report ===
The Board of Inquiry concluded "The accident was the result of a loss of height and airspeed caused by the aircraft encountering, at approximately 250ft after take-off, an unpredictable thunderstorm cell which gave rise to a sudden reversal of wind direction, heavy rain, and possible downdraft conditions. The formation of the cell could not have been predicted by the meteorological forecaster at Kano airport, nor was it visible to the pilot in command before taking off. In the circumstances, no blame can be attached to the pilot in command for taking off."

The report also recommended that the International Civil Aviation Organization urgently consider investigating the special hazards to aircraft inherent in taking off or landing in close proximity to thunderstorms.
