= Bureau of Air Safety Investigation (Pakistan) =

Government agency

Government agency overview
- Formed: 2023
- Jurisdiction: Pakistan
- Parent department: Aviation Division, GoP

The Bureau of Air Safety Investigation (BASI) is one of the two agencies created through the division of the Pakistan Civil Aviation Authority (CAA). The other is the Pakistan Airport Authority, representing the split of responsibilities and functions related to the regulation of the national aviation sector.

The Bureau of Air Safety Investigation was established with the primary objective of enhancing the investigation process for accidents and incidents arising from aircraft navigation in Pakistan. This creation was prompted by the necessity to address the demands made by the European Union and the International Civil Aviation Organization (ICAO) to lift the ban on Pakistan Airlines. Improving safety investigation practices and procedures was a critical step towards meeting the standards required for the removal of restrictions on Pakistan Airlines by international aviation authorities.

== History ==
The establishment of the Bureau of Air Safety Investigation was a component of the Pakistan Air Safety Investigation Bill - 2023. This legislative initiative was successfully passed by the National Assembly of Pakistan on July 27, 2023. MNA Saad Waseem Akhtar Sheikh introduced the bill on behalf of Aviation Minister Khawaja Saad Rafique. The primary objective of this bill was to enhance the investigation process for accidents and incidents arising from aircraft navigation within Pakistan.

Following its approval by the Senate Standing Committee on Aviation on August 2, 2023, the "Pakistan Air Safety Investigation Bill - 2023" underwent a second successful passage through the National Assembly on August 3, 2023. Subsequently, the President of Pakistan, Arif Alvi, provided his approval for the bill on August 7, 2023. This process solidified the establishment of the Bureau of Air Safety Investigation, marking a significant development in enhancing the investigation of aviation accidents and incidents within Pakistan.

The determination to split the Pakistan Civil Aviation Authority (CAA) into two distinct entities, namely the Pakistan Airport Authority and the Bureau of Air Safety Investigation, was made by a nine-member committee appointed by the Ministry of Aviation. The committee was granted a deadline of October 15 to finalize its work and recommendations regarding this significant division of the aviation regulatory body.

Despite recommendations from foreign experts, the federal government has yet to implement the suggestion to make the Civil Aviation Authority’s (CAA) Safety Investigation Board (SIB) an independent body. Although the board was detached from the Ministry of Defence, the proposed plan to grant it independence and separate it entirely from direct government supervision, by placing it under the prime minister's oversight, has not been acted upon and remains pending.
