= Bhoja Air =

Pakistani airline

| IATA | ICAO | Call sign |
|---|---|---|
| B4 | BHO | BHOJA |
- Founded: 1993
- Commenced operations: 7 November 1993; 6 March 2012 (relaunch)
- Ceased operations: 2000 (pre-relaunch); 22 April 2012
- Operating bases: Jinnah International Airport
- Fleet size: 3 (After relaunch)
- Destinations: 5 (Before closure)
- Headquarters: Karachi, Pakistan
- Key people: M. Arshad Jalil (CEO); Air Cdre Javed Ishaq (DMD)
- Website: www.bhojaair.com.pk

Bhoja Air (Urdu: بھوجا ائیر) was a Pakistani airline based in Karachi, Sindh, Pakistan.

The airline was founded in 1993 and operated a small domestic network of scheduled passenger flights. Due to financial difficulties, the airline completely suspended operations between 2000 and 2012. After a brief re-launch, and the subsequent crash of Bhoja Air Flight 213 near Rawalpindi 44 days after the relaunch, Bhoja Air lost its operational license and ceased operations in April 2012.

== History ==
On 7 November 1993, Bhoja Air started operations on domestic routes between Karachi, Lahore and Quetta with a dry leased Boeing 737-200. It was registered in Pakistan, making Bhoja the first private airline in the country to operate a Western manufactured aircraft. Bhoja Air was a privately owned airline of the Bhoja Group of Companies with its head office at Shahrah–e-Liaquat, Karachi and corporate offices at KDA Scheme No 1. In 1996, it signed a deal with the handling agent group OGDENS with complete ground handling equipment at Karachi, capable of handling Boeing 747s.

In the same year another sister company, Pakistan Aviators and Aviation located at Allama Iqbal International Airport, Lahore was purchased, along with a hotel for passenger stop-overs.

On 24 January 1998 Bhoja Air commenced international flights from Karachi to Dubai where Saleem Ahmad Kashmiri was given charge of the airline operations in the Gulf. Later, Bhoja Air operated flights to the U.A.E. from all major cities of Pakistan. However, due to financial difficulties, Bhoja Air suspended its operations in 2000, although its airline licence issued by Pakistan Civil Aviation Authority remained valid and it maintained a fully functional headquarters office in Karachi and a flight ops and camp office at Karachi Jinnah International.

The airline became active again during late 2011, and on 6 March 2012, they operated their first flight in twelve years.

The airline was sold by its former owner and Chairman Farooq Bhoja to Arshad Jalil. Under the new ownership structure, 80% shares of Bhoja Air were owned by its Managing Director Arshad Jalil, with the rest owned by his wife, their son and three other people including its former owner Farooq Bhoja.

Among the minority shareholders, Farooq Bhoja owned only five percent of the shares, the remaining shares belonging to two directors, Mazhar Hussain and Zeeshan Kirmani.

On 20 April, Bhoja Air Flight 213 from Karachi to Islamabad crashed, killing all 127 passengers and crew aboard.

=== Closure ===
Following the crash of Flight 213, the airline fully suspended operations for a second time on 22 April, just six weeks after their relaunch. The crash reduced their fleet size from three to two aircraft, thus, Bhoja Air was in breach of Pakistani law, which requires airlines to have at least three aircraft; Bhoja Air had lost one in the crash of Flight 213, a second was grounded, leaving only one operational aircraft. As a result, the Civil Aviation Authority (CAA) suspended the operating license of the airline on 29 May after a grace period, starting from the day of the crash of Flight 213.

Bhoja Air was planning to lease another aircraft and resume operations by mid-August with the assistance of an unnamed foreign airline; however, these plans never came to fruition. The airline subsequently sold its remaining two aircraft and was shut down completely with the sale of their last aircraft in July 2012. All staff had their contracts terminated.

== Destinations ==
Bhoja Air served the following destinations as of April 2012, when all services were suspended:

Pakistan

- Islamabad - Benazir Bhutto International Airport
- Karachi - Jinnah International Airport
- Lahore - Allama Iqbal International Airport
- Multan - Multan International Airport
- Faisalabad - Faisalabad International Airport

Bhoja also planned on launching another domestic station in Sukkur; however that did not materialise, despite being listed in the airline's website booking menu.

== Former Fleet ==
The Bhoja Air fleet consisted of the following aircraft at the time of service being suspended in April 2012:

Bhoja Air fleet
| Aircraft | In fleet | Notes |
|---|---|---|
| Boeing 737-200 | 2 | One crashed as Flight 213 |
| DC-9 | 1 | |
| Yak-42 | 1 | |
| Total | 2 | |

For a short time, Bhoja also operated a McDonnell Douglas DC-9-30 through Star Air Aviation to supplement its own fleet after the loss of one 737-200 in a crash.

Two more leased 737-200s were never delivered due to suspension of operations.

Bhoja Air previously operated the Yakovlev Yak-42.

== Accidents and incidents ==
- On 20 April 2012, a Boeing 737-200, operating Flight 213 and carrying 127 people on a flight from Karachi to Islamabad, crashed near Chaklala during approach, killing everyone on board. Eyewitness reports say that the aircraft was already on fire on its landing approach before it crashed, perhaps due to a strike of lightning. Initial reports suggest that as the pilots of Flight 213 attempted to land amidst rain and strong winds, the aircraft might have flown into an unexpected wind shear. The aircraft was on dry-lease from South African airline Comair, and had been acquired and placed in service by Bhoja Air in February 2012. Minister for Interior A. Rehman Malik said on 22 April 2012 that the name of Farouk Bhoja, the Chairman of the Airline, had been placed on the Exit Control List (ECL).
