= Aeroclub Manitoba Airfield =

Aeroclub Manitoba Airfield Aeródromo Aeroclub Manitoba
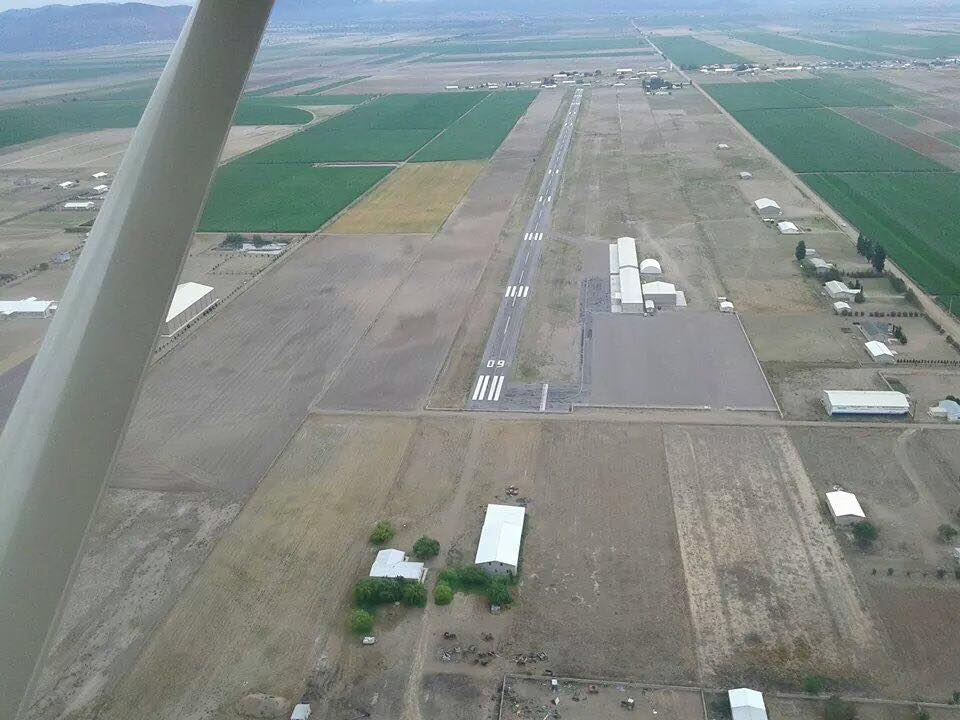
- IATA: –; ICAO: –; LID: AMT

Summary
- Airport type: Private
- Operator: Aero Club Manitoba S.A. de C.V.
- Serves: Ciudad Cuauhtémoc, Chihuahua
- Elevation AMSL: 6,529 ft / 1,990 m
- Coordinates: 28°39′21″N 106°54′19″W

Map

Runways
Direction	Length		Surface
Direction	ft	m	Surface
09-27	5,413	1,650	Asphalt
- Data from

Aeroclub Manitoba or Ciudad Cuauhtémoc Airfield (AFAC: AMT) is a small private airport operated by Aero Club Manitoba S.A. de C.V. and is located 28 kilometers (17 milles) north of Ciudad Cuauhtémoc, Chihuahua. It has 5,413 feet long by 57 feet wide runway, a 176,528 sq ft platform, 2 taxiways and hangars. Currently it is only used for general aviation purposes and is the headquarter of the Manitoba Aviation School.

== Accidents and incidents ==
- On July 23, 2019, a Piper PA-30-160 Twin Comanche aircraft with registration XB-OYB owned by the Manitoba Aeroclub Aviation School that was making a private flight between the Aeroclub Manitoba Airfield and Durango Airport, crashed into an agricultural field Shortly after taking off in the municipality of Cuauhtémoc, Chihuahua, killing the pilot and the 3 passengers.
