= Aeroméxico Connect Flight 2431 =

2018 aviation accident in Mexico

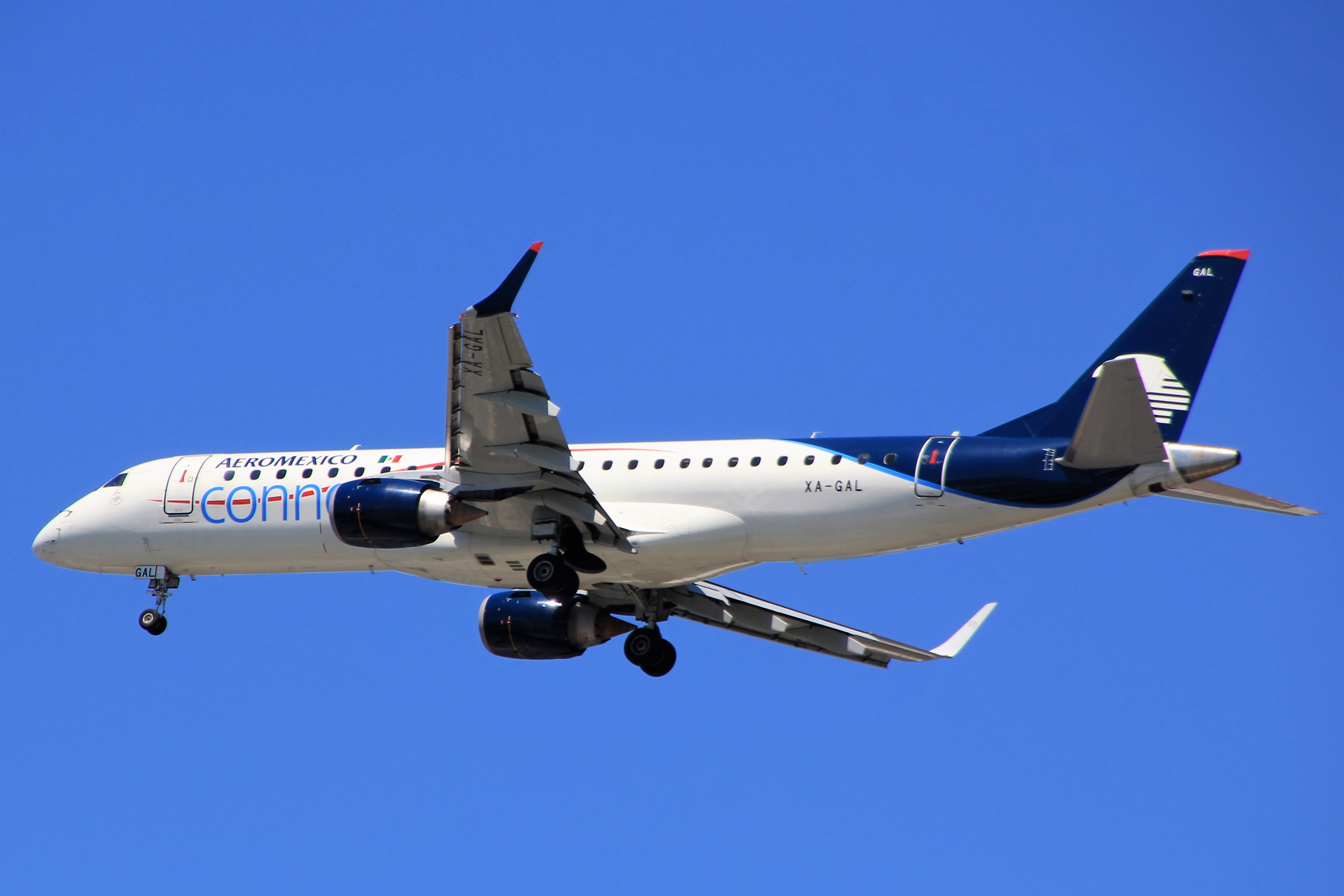
- XA-GAL, the aircraft involved in the accident, seen in 2017

Accident
- Date: July 31, 2018
- Summary: Loss of control on takeoff due to low altitude windshear
- Site: Durango International Airport, Durango, Mexico; 24°08′16.71″N 104°31′02.46″W

Aircraft
- Aircraft type: Embraer 190AR
- Operator: Aeroméxico Connect
- IATA flight No.: 5D431
- ICAO flight No.: SLI2431
- Call sign: COSTERA 2431
- Registration: XA-GAL
- Flight origin: Durango International Airport
- Destination: Mexico City International Airport
- Occupants: 103
- Passengers: 99
- Crew: 4
- Fatalities: 0
- Injuries: 39
- Survivors: 103

Aeroméxico Connect Flight 2431 was a Mexican domestic scheduled passenger flight bound for Mexico City that crashed on takeoff from Durango International Airport on July 31, 2018. Shortly after becoming airborne, the plane encountered sudden wind shear caused by a microburst. The plane rapidly lost speed and altitude and impacted the runway, detaching the engines and skidding to a halt about 1,000 feet (300 m) beyond the runway. The plane caught fire and was destroyed. All 103 people on board survived, but 39 passengers and crew members were injured.

A final report on the crash was released on February 23, 2019. Investigators found that the primary cause of the accident was adverse weather conditions encountered by the flight, and contributing factors included crew error, air traffic controller error, and the lack of equipment that could detect wind shear conditions at airports. Investigators determined that the flight crew was distracted by an unauthorized student in the cockpit who was flying the plane, which led to a loss of situational awareness. The crew failed to react to dangerous weather conditions that were developing, and did not notice irregularities in the airspeed indicators that could have alerted them to potential hazards. The sole air traffic controller on duty at the airport at the time also failed to notify the aircraft of rapidly deteriorating weather conditions.

The accident and the subsequent investigation led to changes in Mexican aviation regulations to prevent non-working airline employees from being present in the cockpit of an aircraft at any time during a flight. Investigators also made several recommendations for changes in flight crew and air traffic controller training, and to improve the capabilities of weather detection equipment in place at airports to improve overall aviation safety.

== Accident ==
The flight, number 2431, was operated by Aeroméxico Connect and was a regularly scheduled flight from Durango International Airport to Mexico City International Airport. Originally scheduled to leave at 2:56 p.m. Central Time (UTC−06:00), the departure was slightly delayed when the first officer observed a fuel leak from the number one engine and asked maintenance crews to investigate. Crews eventually concluded that the rate of leakage was within safe limits and cleared the plane for flight. The aircraft left the gate at 3:14 p.m. and headed toward the end of runway 03. As the plane taxied, rain started to fall with increasing intensity, accompanied by strong gusts of wind. At 3:18, the air traffic controller reported 20-knot (23 mph; 37 km/h) winds from 90 degrees. The flight information service for the airport published an updated weather report at 3:18 indicating the presence of thunderstorms and rain, reduced visibility, and the presence of cumulonimbus clouds. The air traffic controller did not see this update because he was working alone and was attending to Flight 2431. The rain became so heavy that the controller in the tower could not see the runway. Even though the controller was in the best position to see the deteriorating weather conditions, he did not notify the aircraft about any of his observations. The flight was cleared for takeoff at 3:21. Severe wind gusts uprooted several trees at the airport, knocking out power and communication lines. A special weather update was sent out by the flight information service at 3:22, warning of thunderstorms, 0 feet of visibility and a decrease in the ceiling to 0 feet, but this report was never received by the tower controller due to the power outage.

The aircraft proceeded down the runway. After it reached a speed of 147 knots (169 mph; 272 km/h), the pilot flying the plane rotated the controls to bring the aircraft airborne, and raised the gear when the craft was two feet (0.6 m) above the runway. The plane began its takeoff with a headwind, but the winds quickly shifted to a right crosswind of 11 knots (13 mph; 20 km/h), increasing to 33 knots (38 mph; 61 km/h) as the plane proceeded down the runway. The plane had reached its maximum altitude of about 30 feet (9 m) and a maximum indicated airspeed of 151 knots (174 mph; 280 km/h) when the wind direction suddenly shifted to a 24-knot (28 mph; 44 km/h) tailwind. The plane rapidly lost airspeed and altitude, and an audible alarm of "DON'T SINK" sounded in the cockpit. Five seconds later, the left wing struck the runway, and both engines broke away from the wings. The plane skidded off the runway and came to rest about 1,000 feet (300 m) beyond the end of the runway. All 103 people on board the plane were able to evacuate and survived the crash before a fire broke out that destroyed the aircraft.

== Aircraft ==
The aircraft was an Embraer 190, registration XA-GAL, msn 19000173. It was first delivered to US Airways in 2008 as N960UW before being sold to Republic Airways Holdings in 2009. Under Republic Airways ownership, the aircraft was re-registered as N167HQ, operating for Midwest Airlines, a former subsidiary of Republic, and later for fellow Republic subsidiary (at the time) Frontier Airlines, until late 2013. After Republic retired its Embraer 190 aircraft from its operations, Republic then leased N167HQ to Aeroméxico Connect in 2014, who registered the aircraft as XA-GAL. At the time of its loss, the aircraft had flown a total of 27,257 hours, and had 18,200 takeoff and landing cycles.

When it was originally manufactured, the aircraft was equipped with a Honeywell WU-880 weather radar. This system can detect storms along the flight path of the aircraft and give pilots a visual indication of the intensity of the storm. The aircraft was also equipped with a wind shear detection and escape guidance system that can detect wind shear conditions and alert the pilots using a combination of visual and audio alarms. The audio alarms are disabled in the event of a higher priority audio alarm, such as the ground proximity sensor alarm.

== Crew ==
The pilot in command of the flight was 38-year-old Carlos Galván Meyran, a resident of Mexico City. He held an airline transport pilot licence and had been working at Aeroméxico since 2010, and as a pilot since 2011. He had a total of 3,700 logged flight hours at the time of the crash. Galván completed his captain training for the Embraer E-Jet series in June 2017 and had logged 1,064 hours in the type. He occupied the left-hand seat in the cockpit during the flight, and suffered serious injuries in the accident, requiring hip and spine surgery which doctors called successful.

The assigned first officer, Daniel Dardon Chávez, held an airline transport pilot licence and had a total of 1,973 logged flight hours, including 460 hours on the Embraer 190 aircraft. He was 25 years old at the time of the accident and was originally from Metepec, State of Mexico. He had become certified to copilot this type of aircraft in February 2018. He received minor injuries in the crash. During the flight, he was occupying the jump seat in the back of the cockpit instead of the right-hand seat normally occupied by the first officer.

Another pilot who flew for the airline, José Ramón Vázquez, was also in the cockpit. He held a commercial pilot license and had a total of 3,296 logged flight hours. He was certified to fly the Beechcraft King Air F90 and Beechcraft Super King Air 200 aircraft. He was in the process of receiving training to fly the E-Jets, but as of the time of the flight, he had only received initial classroom instruction, had completed 64 hours of simulator time, and had not yet received his certification. He had no experience on the Embraer E190 aircraft. At the time of the flight, he occupied the right-hand seat in the cockpit normally occupied by the copilot, and was the pilot flying the plane until the last five seconds before the crash, when Captain Galván took control. Vázquez received minor injuries in the crash.

Two female flight attendants were in the main cabin. The senior flight attendant had been employed by the airline since June 2012 and suffered a fractured lumbar vertebra. The junior flight attendant had been employed by the airline for about a week and received minor injuries in the crash.

== Passengers ==
The plane departed with 99 passengers and 4 crew members. Two of the passengers were airline employees being shuttled between locations, including the student pilot who was in the cockpit. Of the passengers, excluding the student pilot, 31 were Mexican citizens, 65 were United States citizens, 1 was a Spanish citizen, and 1 was a Colombian citizen.

== Aftermath ==
Immediately after the crash, passengers reported seeing smoke and flames as they rushed to escape the plane. Some passengers said that a door had been torn off and that the plane's fuselage had broken in two, allowing them to jump directly out of a gap in the side of the aircraft. The crew was able to open the emergency exit slides and safely evacuate all of the occupants within 90 seconds. About three to four minutes after coming to a stop, and after all passengers had been evacuated, the aircraft exploded and was engulfed in flames.

The air traffic controller attempted to contact the aircraft, and when it received no response he contacted the approach sector controller to see if they were in contact with the aircraft. The controller dispatched an airport service vehicle to inspect the runway. The driver saw the aircraft's engines at the side of the runway and smoke rising from beyond the runway. Airport officials activated the emergency operation center at the airport, and dispatched firefighters to assist with the rescue and to extinguish the fire.

After reports about the crash came in, Aeroméxico sent a team to Durango to provide assistance to affected passengers and their families. The company announced that it would cover all medical, accommodation, transportation, and incidental expenses resulting from the crash. It praised the actions of the crew and said that the crew's quick and efficient evacuation of the plane was instrumental in avoiding additional serious injuries and fatalities. It also said that the pilot's expertise and professionalism had prevented the loss of life in the accident.

Different sources gave conflicting reports about the number of injuries from the incident. The Ministry of Health initially reported that there were 18 passengers injured. The Red Cross said there were 97 injuries. The governor of Durango told media that 49 people had been treated for injuries at hospitals. Two days after the crash, Aeroméxico reported that 17 passengers were still hospitalized, 16 were in the process of being released, and 24 had already been released from medical care. The final official accident report stated that there were 14 serious injuries and 25 minor injuries.

About a month after the crash, Aeroméxico announced that the three pilots who were in the cockpit that day had been fired from the company. It said that while it did not feel that the crash was the fault of the pilots, they had violated company procedures by not following their assigned roles during the flight by allowing the trainee pilot to take control of the aircraft. The labor union representing the pilots protested the termination, saying that the decision was carried out based only on a preliminary accident report, and that a full investigation into the accident was still ongoing. Shortly afterward, Mexico's Directorate General of Civil Aeronautics (DGAC) issued a change in regulations that prohibited airlines from allowing inactive pilots and flight attendants from occupying the cockpit of aircraft during flights. Aeroméxico pilots opposed this change and called for a strike, viewing the sudden removal of a travel benefit as a violation of their collective bargaining agreement between the union and the airline. After negotiations, the union representing the pilots agreed to a change in the agreement, where all non-working flight crews will have reserved seats in the main cabin, and continue to be denied access to the cockpit.

== Investigation ==
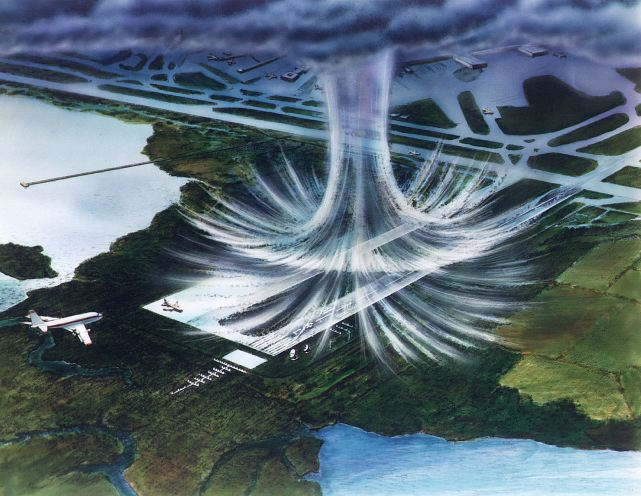
Illustration of a microburst. The air moves in a downward motion until it hits ground level. It then spreads outward in all directions.

Shortly after the crash, the DGAC announced that it had formed a commission to investigate the crash. The commission received assistance from the US National Transportation Safety Board and the US Federal Aviation Administration. Additional assistance was provided by Embraer SA, who had built the aircraft, and General Electric Co., who had built the engines on the aircraft. Investigators quickly located the flight data recorders for the aircraft and found them to be in perfect condition.

On September 5, a little over a month after the accident, José Armando Constantino Tercero, the lead investigator from the DGAC, announced that the final conclusion had not yet been reached, but that the cause of the accident appeared to be sudden wind shear from a microburst. He said that the pilots had not received any notice of the adverse conditions prior to starting the takeoff, and that neither human nor mechanical failure appeared to be to blame for the crash. He also said that analysis of the cockpit voice recorder revealed that an unauthorized pilot training was taking place during the flight, and that the trainee pilot had been occupying the copilot seat and flying the plane until shortly before the crash. This was not in accordance with aviation regulations, and he said that administrative proceedings had been initiated. Nevertheless, he stressed that neither the presence nor the actions of any of the pilots caused the accident. Shortly afterward, the airline announced that it had fired the three pilots who were in the cockpit of the flight.

The investigators conducted a series of flight tests in full flight simulators in Mexico and Brazil using the same weather conditions that existed at the time of the flight, with crews with similar levels of experience as the crew of Flight 2431. The simulator crews were not given advance notice of the situation that they were about to encounter. In one situation, the flight crew turned on the weather radar, recognized the signs of wind shear from the variations and visual cues on the instruments, and successfully aborted the takeoff. In a second scenario, the wind shear weather conditions were not loaded into the simulator until after the takeoff roll had started. In that case, the simulated flight reached a maximum altitude of about fifteen feet (5 m) before losing altitude and impacted the ground with the landing gear. The simulator group concluded that because the crew did not notice the presence of wind shear during the takeoff, they could not have been able to recover the aircraft in time to avoid the accident.

=== Final report ===
On February 23, 2019, the final report was released. It concluded that the accident was caused by "impact with the runway caused by a loss of control of the airplane during the final phase of takeoff as a result of wind shear at low altitude which caused a loss of speed and altitude." The investigation found no mechanical malfunctions in the aircraft that led to the accident.

The report identified contributing factors to the accident caused by the flight crew. One factor was that the pilot of the plane, who was not a certified instructor, was giving instruction to a student pilot, who was flying the plane at the time. This caused a loss of situational awareness and the pilots did not maintain a "sterile cockpit" that was free from distractions. It found that among other mistakes, the pilot and the student pilot failed to notice that the airspeed indicator on the pilot's side was giving different information than the airspeed indicator on the copilot's side. Observation of this fact could have provided information about the dangerous weather conditions at the time. Additionally, it found that the pilots failed to follow standard operating procedures during the flight, including configuring the aircraft for the weather conditions that were encountered immediately before and during the takeoff.

Investigators also identified contributing factors related to the air traffic controller. The report said that the tower controller failed to follow proper procedures that were in place for weather conditions creating the possibility of low altitude wind shear. It faulted the controller for failing to inform the departing flight about the rapidly deteriorating visibility and changes in wind speed and direction. It said that the controller did not have adequate supervision and assistance in the air traffic control tower.

=== Recommendations ===
The investigation made several recommendations to the airline to prevent similar accidents from happening in the future. It said that the airline should make changes to its operating procedures to prevent a person who is not an assigned crew member from taking the controls of the aircraft during any phase of that flight. It recommended additional training for air crews on sterile cockpit procedure, to ensure that crews are able to maintain full awareness of the aircraft and external conditions. It recommended additional training on how to recognize potential wind shear situations in storms and address those situations during flight. It recommended training on the use of maximum thrust during takeoff, the verification of the aircraft configuration for the current weather conditions, and the active monitoring of airspeed, altitude, and vertical speed instruments during takeoff. It recommended changes to procedures for identifying and resolving situations where there is a disagreement between flight instruments. It recommended procedures for establishing a safe altitude before raising the landing gear. Because the commission found that incorrect barometric pressures had been entered into the flight control computer of the aircraft, it recommended additional care be exercised by flight crews in keeping track of the information that it receives from air traffic control to guarantee that the information used for the flight is correct. The third pilot had been listed as a passenger, but his absence from the passenger compartment had not been noted by the flight attendants. The commission recommended that the airline revise its cabin crew operating procedures to identify and address situations where passengers are not in their expected place on the plane.

The commission made additional recommendations to the airport operator and the Mexican civil aviation agency. The commission stated that air traffic controllers should not operate alone and that there should be additional personnel to receive and communicate adverse weather conditions to aircraft. The commission found that the DGAC had not published guidelines on how to recognize wind shear situations, or the hazards of wind shear in different types of storms. The commission recommended that the DGAC develop a program to identify and classify the level of risk in storms. The commission also found that the airport did not have equipment to detect the presence of wind shear, so it recommended that the agency implement a program to install facilities to detect variations in the longitudinal, lateral, and vertical direction of winds. This additional information may be included in navigational aids. The commission recommended that airports identify and eliminate risks that can interrupt power, voice communications, and data communications in the control towers. Finally, the investigation found that CCTV cameras installed at the airport were helpful during the investigation, but the investigation was hampered by the lack of timestamps on the video. A recommendation that all cameras in place at airports include timestamps on recordings was made.

== See also ==
Other flights brought down by microbursts:

- Delta Air Lines Flight 191
- Pan Am Flight 759
- 1956 Kano Airport BOAC Argonaut crash
- 1950 Air France multiple Douglas DC-4 accidents
- Georgian Airways Flight 834
- USAir Flight 1016
- Martinair Flight 495
- Eastern Airlines Flight 66
