= Aviation Secretary of Pakistan =

Administrative post of Aviation Division

- دبیر ہوابازی پاکستان
- Incumbent; Shoukat Ali
- Seat: Islamabad
- Appointer: Prime Minister of Pakistan
- Website: Aviation Division

The Aviation Secretary of Pakistan (Urdu: دبیر ہوابازی پاکستان) is the Federal Secretary for the Aviation Division. The position holder is a BPS-22 grade officer, usually belonging to the Pakistan Administrative Service. The position of Secretary of Aviation is considered to be a coveted one, with the Secretary being in charge of major establishments including the Pakistan Civil Aviation Authority, Pakistan International Airlines, Airports Security Force, and Pakistan Meteorological Department. Mr Ahsan Ali Mangi (PAS) is the current Aviation Secretary of Pakistan.

== See also ==
- Civil aviation authority
- Airport Security Force
- Pakistan International Airlines
- Airlines of Pakistan
