= Bhoja Air Flight 213 =

2012 aviation accident in Rawalpindi, Pakistan

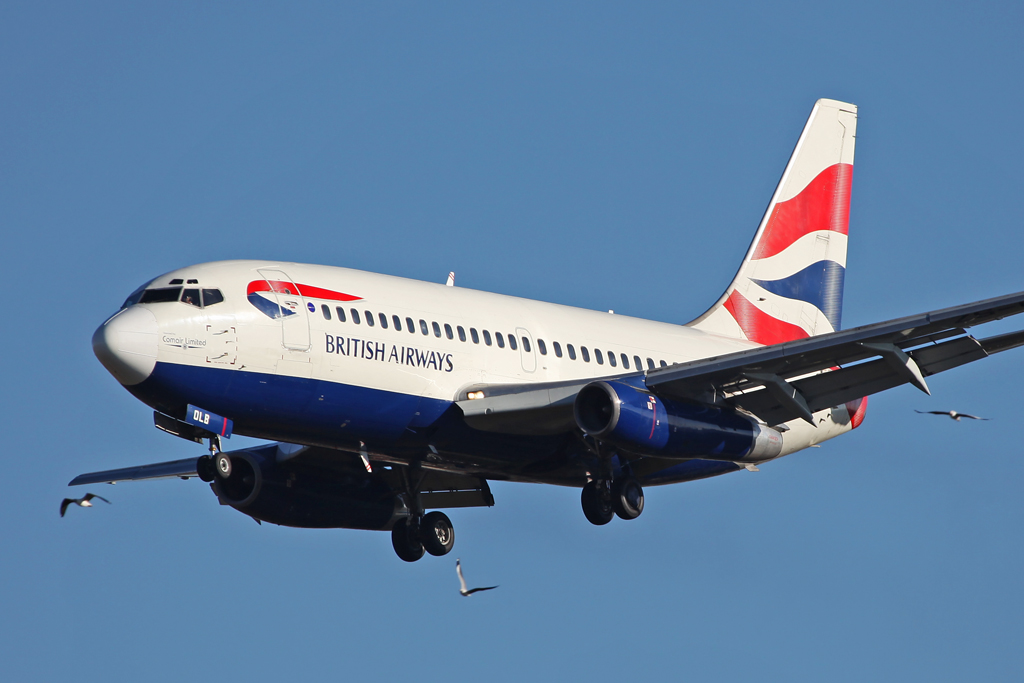
- The aircraft involved in the accident, photographed in 2009 while in service with Comair

Accident
- Date: 20 April 2012
- Summary: Microburst-induced wind shear followed by pilot error
- Site: Hussain Abad, Islamabad, Pakistan; 33°35′15″N 73°08′55″E

Aircraft
- Aircraft type: Boeing 737-236A
- Operator: Bhoja Air
- IATA flight No.: B4 213
- ICAO flight No.: BHO213
- Call sign: BHOJA 213
- Registration: AP-BKC
- Flight origin: Jinnah International Airport, Karachi, Pakistan
- Destination: Benazir Bhutto International Airport, Islamabad, Pakistan
- Occupants: 127
- Passengers: 121
- Crew: 6
- Fatalities: 127
- Survivors: 0

Bhoja Air Flight 213 was a domestic scheduled passenger flight operated by Pakistani private airline Bhoja Air from Karachi to Islamabad. On 20 April 2012, the Boeing 737-200 aircraft serving the route crashed in bad weather during the final approach, killing all 121 passengers and 6 crew on board. It remains the second deadliest air disaster in Pakistan, after the 2010 crash of Airblue Flight 202.

The crash was caused by the crew's inadequate flight management during adverse weather conditions. The flight crew were not trained adequately and properly on the automated system of the Boeing 737-236A, a more advanced version of the Boeing 737-200 series, and didn't retain sufficient knowledge on the correct procedures for handling an aircraft in bad weather conditions. Additionally, Bhoja Air's lack of oversight and multiple errors within Pakistan CAA's monitoring system of Pakistani airliners further contributed to the accident.

== Aircraft ==
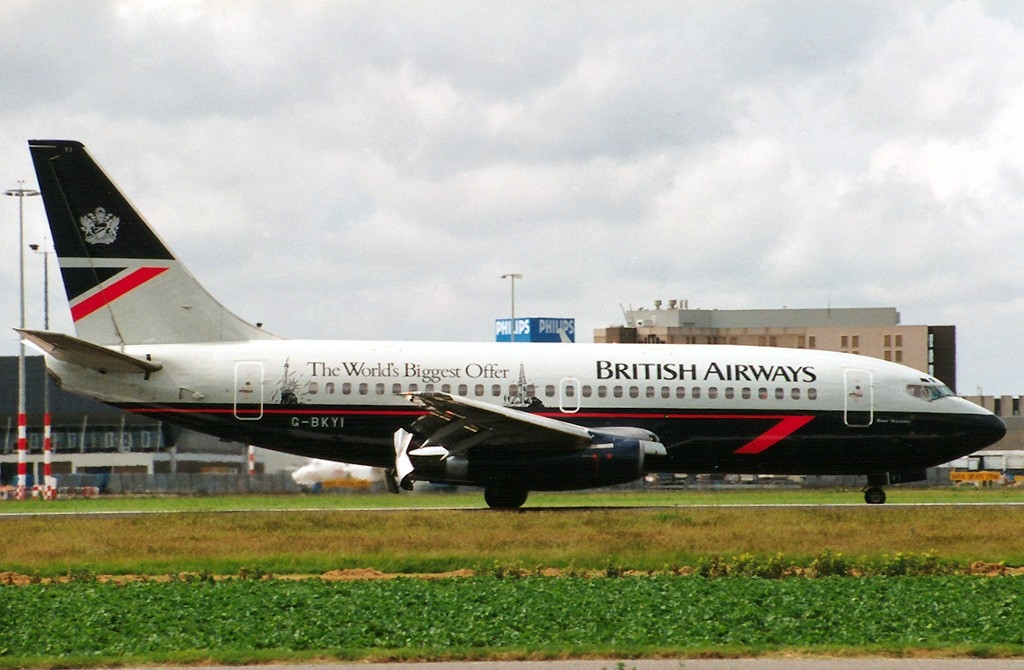
The aircraft involved in the crash during its operation with British Airways in 1991

The aircraft involved in the accident was a Boeing 737-236, registered AP-BKC, with the manufacturer serial number 23167. The aircraft had accumulated 46,933 flight hours, of which 69 were with Bhoja Air. The aircraft was powered by 2 Pratt & Whitney JT8D-15A Turbofan engines.

The last inspection was carried out on the same day of the accident, prior to its departure. No known defects were recorded.

== Accident ==
The aircraft was operating a domestic scheduled flight from Jinnah International Airport, Karachi, to Benazir Bhutto International Airport, Islamabad, which was the airline's first evening flight in almost 12 years. It was the inaugural flight of Bhoja Air's second daily service on this route (Bhoja Air was earlier closed down amidst financial difficulties in the year 2000, but restarted operations in March 2012). There were six crew and 121 passengers on board. The flight departed from Karachi at 17:05 PST (12:00 UTC) and was due to land at Islamabad at 18:50 (13:50 UTC). The flight was piloted by Captain Noorullah Afridi (58) and First Officer Javaid Malik (53). The flight was uneventful until its approach to Islamabad.

=== Approach ===
While approaching Islamabad, Lahore automatic terminal information service (ATIS) broadcast the weather information in and around Lahore, including the Islamabad area. The broadcast stated that clouds and thunder were present in Islamabad, and a dust storm warning was issued around the Lahore area. First Officer Malik asked the Captain on whether they should divert to Peshawar, but Captain Afridi refused, stating that "God will help us". Approximately a minute later, he noticed that a squall line had formed in the area. He started to become pre-occupied with the weather. First Officer Malik gave multiple information regarding the weather condition, but due to the pre-occupied state of Captain Afridi, he ignored them all.

Air Traffic Control in Lahore cleared Flight 213 to descend. The seatbelt sign was turned on due to possible turbulence, and the crew decided to discuss the weather again. Following the discussion, Captain Afridi finally decided that the flight must land at Islamabad, regardless of the weather conditions. As Flight 213 became closer to the squall line, Captain Afridi became increasingly worried. Subsequently, he increased the airspeed to 280 knots (520 km/h; 320 mph). First Officer Malik then stated that the plane would enter the squall line. Meanwhile, the aircraft began to experience turbulence.

Captain Afridi contacted Islamabad ATC, and asked on whether there was a gap between the squall line, as he intended to penetrate it from the west side. The controller in Islamabad initially answered that there was no gap between the line, but then a very small gap was observed in the south. Captain Afridi responded that they would try to penetrate through the line. The pilots told the cabin crew to ask the passengers to occupy their seats as the turbulence began to intensify. First Officer Malik later suggested that they should go towards the right (east) to avoid the storm system, but Captain Afridi refused, insisting that they should land at Islamabad.

Flight 213 descended through 10,000 feet (3,000 m) and levelled off at 5,500 feet (1,700 m). Even though no formal approach briefing had taken place, First Officer Malik stated that the aircraft's approach preparation had been set. The autopilot and auto-throttle were engaged and the aircraft was cleared to descend further. Islamabad ATC then gave another weather update to the crew, stating that there was light drizzle in Islamabad, with gusts up to 20 knots (37 km/h; 23 mph), which was acknowledged by the crew. Captain Afridi stated that the squall line had arrived in Islamabad and that they would be flying very close to it. A few minutes later, he noticed that the sky suddenly had become dark, meaning that Flight 213 was entering the squall line.

The aircraft continued its descent. After being cleared by ATC for an ILS approach to runway 30, the crew configured the aircraft for landing. The flaps, slats and the landing gear were extended and the aircraft started to turn after its lateral navigation was engaged in the "selected mode", which was later deactivated by Captain Afridi during the middle of the turn. First Officer Malik then stated that the airspeed was at 220 knots (410 km/h; 250 mph), which was met with surprise from the Captain. A few seconds later, rain began to pound the aircraft, further startling Captain Afridi.

Captain Afridi became extremely pre-occupied with the changing flight parameters and the effect of the adverse weather conditions to the aircraft. Meanwhile, First Officer Malik seemed to be ignorant about the matter. Instead of recommending a missed approach, the first officer continued to carry out cockpit checks. Flight 213 then levelled off at 3,600 feet (1,100 m) and the autopilot captured the glideslope. With a bank angle of approximately 5 to 20 degrees to the right, the aircraft entered its final approach phase and the crew put the aircraft into a descent.

=== First downdraft ===
The rain rapidly intensified, pounding the aircraft at an extreme rate. The aircraft was struck by a downdraft and because of it, the pitch started to increase. As the autopilot tried to maintain the glideslope, the airspeed decayed. The thrust was increased-albeit not sufficiently. The GPWS alarm blared, alerting the crew about the presence of windshear. Captain Afridi yelled "no! no!" and First Officer Malik asked the captain to go-around.

The downdraft finally dissipated and the crew decided to manually control the aircraft. The autothrottle, however, remained in engaged position. By this time, the airspeed had decreased from 173 to 160 knots (320 to 296 km/h; 199 to 184 mph) and the aircraft had deviated from the glideslope. Due to it, the crew became confused and pre-occupied with the weather conditions. The TAWS alarm sounded, but the crew didn't give any response to it. The flight continued its approach. First Officer Malik maintained his communication with the controller while Captain Afridi was at the controls. Both the pitch angle and the thrust were decreased.

=== Second downdraft ===
The aircraft encountered another downdraft. This time, it was more severe than the last, reaching as high as 50 feet per second (15 m/s). The ground proximity warning system (GPWS) alarm blared, causing Captain Afridi to pull the yoke back. The altitude and the thrust, however, continued to decrease. Due to the aircraft being configurated for landing, the airspeed began to decay again.

The downdraft suddenly dissipated in just four seconds. Captain Afridi, who had been struggling to make the aircraft to pitch up, caused the aircraft's nose to rise rapidly. This, in turn, caused the activation of the stick shaker, warning the crew of an impending stall. Alarmed by the stick shaker, Captain Afridi immediately made a nose down input. The altitude rapidly decreased and the thrust remained at a low setting. Multiple warnings blared inside the cockpit, starting from the GPWS "Whoop whoop pull up!" to the windshear warning. Captain Afridi, now frantic, rapidly pulled up the nose again and causing another stick shaker activation. First Officer Malik shouted multiple times to the captain to get out of the stall condition.

The controller in Islamabad later cleared Flight 213 to land; due to the chaotic situation inside the cockpit, the crew never acknowledged the call. Captain Afridi maintained his nose-down input and First Officer Malik could be heard panicking. The GPWS "Whoop whoop pull up" continued to blare inside the cockpit and the aircraft kept descending towards the ground.

=== Crash ===
At 18:40 PKT, with an airspeed of 215 knots (398 km/h; 247 mph) and a pitch angle of 0 degree, the aircraft slammed onto the ground with its main landing gears first. It crashed at a distance of 4.24 nautical miles (4.88 mi; 7.85 km) from the runway, in the small village of Hussain Abad in Islamabad, in heavy rain conditions.^{[Note 1]} The aircraft exploded and struck a 5-metre-high (16 ft) terrace, causing further breakup. The wreckage was spread over 2 kilometres (1.2 mi) radius. All 127 people on board were killed.

A following Airblue flight landed safely five minutes after the accident occurred.

The airport was closed for three hours after the accident due to a lack of fire cover. The emergency crews based at the airport went to the crash site to assist in the firefighting operations there. A total of 100 army personnel were deployed to assist the other rescue personnel. The rescue operation was hampered due to the surge of onlookers at the site. A traffic jam reportedly blocked rescuers from reaching the site quickly. Flights affected by the closure were diverted to Allama Iqbal International Airport, Lahore. At least four houses were badly damaged due to the crash. However, despite the fact that it occurred in a residential area, there were no casualties on the ground.

== Passengers and crew ==
Flight 213 was carrying 121 passengers and 6 crew members. The passengers consisted of 110 adults, six children and five infants. The nationalities of the passengers were not disclosed. Most were thought to be citizens of Pakistan. According to the manifest, at least 2 military officials, a Station Commander Officer of Hyderabad and a squadron leader, were on board Flight 213. A Bhoja Air senior official was also reported to be on board.

The pilot in command of Flight 213 was identified as 58-year-old Noorullah Afridi. According to fellow pilots, he had also worked as flying instructor for Pakistan Air Force Academy in Risalpur. Before joining Bhoja Air, he had served as a captain of a Boeing 737-400 in Shaheen Air International. He had been temporarily trained for the Boeing 737-400 but the training was eventually discontinued as his supervisors in Shaheen Air International thought that he couldn't operate the automated flight deck in an "effective, efficient and safe" manner. The crew logbook showed that he had accrued a total flying experience of more than 10,000 hours, with 2,027 hours on the Boeing 737-200. However, only 82 hours were on the Boeing 737-236A.

The second in command was identified as 53-year-old Javaid Malik. Before working as a commercial pilot, he had served in the Pakistan Air Force. According to the investigation, he had been paired with Captain Afridi since his employment with Shaheen Air International. He later joined Captain Afridi to leave Shaheen Air for Bhoja Air. He had accrued a total flying experience of 2,832 hours, of which 750 hours were on the Boeing 737-200. However, only 82 hours were on the Boeing 737-236A type.

== Aftermath ==
A statement on Bhoja Air's website offered condolences to the affected families and said that it would fulfil its legal obligations under the Pakistani law applicable at the time of the accident. Pakistan Interior Minister Rehman Malik later told news media that the owner of Bhoja Air had been banned from leaving Pakistan in response to the crash. In the immediate aftermath, all hospitals in Islamabad and the neighboring city of Rawalpindi were put on high alert. Crisis centres were set up in Karachi and Islamabad to provide information to the relatives.

President Asif Ali Zardari cut short his trip to cities in Punjab and returned to the capital, and he and Prime Minister Yousuf Raza Gillani sent condolences to the families of those who died in the accident. The Civil Aviation Authority issued an office order at 9 a.m. the next day, requiring all airlines to transport the bodies of the victims free of cost. The families who had already paid for the transportation before the order was released were refunded the amount.

Bhoja Air announced that families of the victims will be flown to Islamabad. According to government officials, all of the victims will be transported to Pakistan Institute of Medical Sciences for the identification process and next-of-kin will be informed to refer to the institute for the identification and the retrieval of the body. Due to the large number of victims, an additional cold storage was provided to the institute.

Two days after the crash of Flight 213, a Shaheen Air International flight suffered a burst tyre during landing in Karachi. Following another aviation incident in Pakistan, authorities conducted a special inspection of every private airliners in the country. Pakistan International Airlines was not included in the inspection as it had undergone such inspection a few months ago.

On 30 April, Bhoja Air announced compensation of Rs. 500,000 to the legal heirs of the victims of the Flight 213. However, the compensation is long overdue. The families of the deceased protested outside the office of Bhoja Air in Karachi.

On 28 May 2012, Bhoja Air's license was revoked by the CAA, due to failing a requirement under the Pakistani civil aviation laws that a carrier must maintain a minimum fleet of three aircraft. Of Bhoja Air's original fleet of 3, one crashed, another was grounded after it developed a fault, leaving only one operational aircraft.

== Investigation ==
An investigation into the crash was opened by the Civil Aviation Authority (CAA) and by the Safety Investigation Board of Pakistan. Boeing assisted the CAA with the investigation. The flight data recorder was recovered on the same day of the crash, while the aircraft's cockpit voice recorder was recovered from the wreckage on the next day. Both flight recorders were handed over to the CAA and later sent to the United States for analysis by Boeing.

Pakistani officials promised a full investigation and Farooq Bhoja, the owner of Bhoja Air, was put on the Exit Control List, meaning he could not leave the country while the criminal investigation was underway against him and the airline.

CAA, the regulatory authority for maintaining aviation safety standards in Pakistan, faced harsh criticism in Pakistani media for allegedly compromising on safety standards. The corruption within CAA, due to politically motivated appointments, was alleged to be the prime reason for the increase in frequency of technical faults, crash landings and catastrophic air accidents. The CAA, however, maintained that it did not issue any airline license or airworthiness certificate under political pressure. It did announce that the Bhoja Air engineers were not qualified to issue the air worthiness certificate.

Following the accident, the CAA announced it would re-certify the fleet of all private airlines in the country. The CAA suspended the airworthiness certificates of two Bhoja Air aircraft on 24 April 2012. The CAA announced that the suspension was lifted on 28 April 2012.

=== Weather ===
Multiple reports indicated that hail and storm conditions were prevailing near the crash site when the accident happened. Bhoja Air officials reported that the aircraft was brought down by heavy winds while local eyewitness claimed that the pilot had lost control of the aircraft. Pakistan's Civil Aviation Authority suggested that the flight might have been brought down by bad weather. There were also reports that the aircraft had been struck by lightning. Local media reported that there had been damaging rain in parts of the country. Intense convective systems were recorded in several regions, including the Islamabad-Rawalpindi metropolitan area.

Data from numerical weather prediction products on the day of the accident showed that a westerly wave was injecting cool air from the northwest, while winds from the Arabian Sea in the south of the country fed warm moisture into the upper part of Pakistan. Interaction between both air masses eventually produced severe thunderstorms in the area, which resulted in the creation of strong updrafts and downdrafts. Satellite data also supported these findings. Images taken at 14:00 local time depicted a development of a severe weather system over the central part of Khyber Pakhtunkhwa, which slowly migrated towards the east and then northeast. Approximately 4 hours later the system deteriorated, creating "severe high impact weather activity" in and around Islamabad. Radar echoes revealed a frontal weather activity which generated severe turbulence and wind shear, which were attributed to the development of microbursts.

Analysis of the obtained data concluded that a strong wind shear and a converging system approached Islamabad's Benazir Bhutto International Airport from the southwest, which intensified at around 18:00 to 19:00 local time. The system later deepened and produced strong wind shear, updrafts and downdrafts. At the time of the crash, the Islamabad area was being pounded with microbursts. Surface winds were reported to be at 24 to 36 knots (44 to 67 km/h; 28 to 41 mph). The flight recorders did confirm that the flight had encountered severe weather, as multiple wind shear warnings could be heard from the recording.

Information regarding the weather condition in Islamabad was continuously updated by authorities from the airport's meteorological department, and was relayed to the controller so that it could be communicated to the crew of Flight 213. The meteorological office in Karachi had also provided weather information to the crew, including METAR and other weather charts and wind charts. This information had been acknowledged by the crew during the flight. The voice cockpit recording even captured Captain Afridi's response to the information, in which he stated "it was very nice whatever you told me".

While weather information for the Islamabad area was available, personnel in the radar and control tower had no information on the presence of wind shear for Runway 30's final approach and thus they couldn't warn the crew on the weather phenomenon. However, the provided weather data was sufficient for the crew to abandon the approach. The approved manual from Bhoja Air clearly stated that an aircraft was not allowed to fly near a weather cell and should remain clear of it by at least 5 to 10 nautical miles (5.8 to 11.5 mi; 9.3 to 18.5 km). The flight plan had listed the nearby Allama Iqbal International Airport in Lahore as an alternate airport, meaning that the crew could have diverted to said airport had the weather condition been in unsuitable condition for an approach or landing. The crew of Flight 213, however, decided to continue their flight towards the active weather cell, thus threatening the safety of their flight.

=== Decision to fly ===
In accordance with Bhoja Air's written manual, the crew should have abandoned the approach to Islamabad due to the deteriorating weather conditions. The flight to Islamabad, however, was continued by the crew.

The flight crew was responsible for the decision on whether to continue, to divert, to deviate from track, or to cancel the flight altogether. As per the ICAO convention, the final responsibility of the safety of the flight lies with the captain of the flight. International regulations stated that controllers were not involved in the decision-making process on whether to continue or to divert a flight. Radar controller could only relay and advise the crew regarding the information that had been provided to them, including weather updates. From said information, the crew could then use the data for the final say. When they had decided, the controller would be informed so that they could assist the crew, particularly in times of need.

Flight 213 was the only aircraft in the area at the time and full attention had been given by the controller. During the approach phase, the crew requested clearance to deviate from their track in order to penetrate a group of cumulonimbus clouds through a small gap. As the controller's radar was less accurate than the one being used by the pilots in the aircraft, the controller wasn't able to detect any active weather cells on the radar and thus the crew was asked whether the area around them, including southeast of Islamabad within a distance of 10 to 15 nautical miles (12 to 17 mi; 19 to 28 km), was clear of severe weather activity. The crew later stated that the weather was clear to approximately 40 nautical miles (46 mi; 74 km) and the radar controller eventually provided radar vectoring for the airport's ILS Runway 30. From the available evidence, investigators concluded that the controllers had properly conducted their duties. The controller had advised the crew to take a new heading, but the suggestion was refused by the crew.

The decision to continue the flight to Islamabad therefore lies with the crew of Flight 213. According to the CVR, the sole reason for the flight to continue flying towards Islamabad, despite the deteriorating weather condition around the area, was due to the fact that this particular flight, an evening flight from Karachi to Islamabad, was Bhoja Air's first ever flight for this sector in 12 years. Bhoja Air had previously been suspended due to financial difficulties in the early 2000s and had been recently relaunched in March 2012, just a month earlier. As the flight was the inaugural flight for the Karachi-Islamabad sector, Captain Afridi concluded that the aircraft must land at Islamabad, regardless of the weather condition. First Officer Malik had advised Captain Afridi to divert the flight, however Captain Afridi insisted about continuing the flight. This was regarded as a critical moment as his sole reason to continue the flight would eventually lead to the accident.

=== Crew error ===
Multiple violations and crew errors were captured on the recorders. There were multiple instances at which the crew had deliberately decided not to follow the approved procedures. The crew's decision to continue the flight to Islamabad was regarded as the first violation of such procedures. They later made further deviations and errors which ultimately caused the aircraft to crash. During the approach phase, investigators noted that the crew did not conduct a formal approach briefing. Despite the visible severe weather activity on their radar, they also did not obtain the airport terminal information service (ATIS) for the Islamabad Airport. Subsequently, the aircraft was struck by strong updrafts and downdrafts, eventually causing various flight parameters to fluctuate.

When the aircraft was struck by the first downdraft, the crew did not carry out the correct procedure outlined by the flight operation manual from Boeing, which stated that flight crew should have disengaged both the autopilot and autothrottle immediately. Then, the crew should have increased the thrust to the maximum, levelled both wings and put the aircraft's nose to an initial pitch of 20 degree. At the time of the incident, the aircraft was following the glideslope, which had been captured earlier by the autopilot. The force of the downdraft then caused the aircraft's nose to pitch up and pushed the aircraft down to a lower altitude. The computer, which had been fed with flight input from the pilots, then tried to compensate for this condition. The autopilot tried to hold the aircraft within the respective glideslope. The autothrottle did increase the thrust, but it stopped before maximum thrust as it tried to accelerate back to the selected speed that had been entered by the pilots. These errors ultimately caused the airspeed to decay.

During the commotion, Captain Afridi could be heard yelling in extreme anxiety, while First Officer Malik, instead of assisting the Captain, decided to shout to the captain for a go-around. He should have taken over the controls from the captain. According to the investigation, both pilots were probably unsure about the behaviour of the aircraft during automation mode. The downdraft later rapidly dissipated. The crew were quite shaken by the experience such that no control activities were recorded on the aircraft for 6 to 8 seconds. The aircraft eventually deviated below the glideslope and its altitude decreased. The crew decided to turn the autopilot off and to control the aircraft manually. However the autothrottle was still engaged.

In the following seconds, the confused flight crew inadvertently endangered the safety of the flight. Due to the decrease in altitude, the TAWS alarm warned the crew of the incoming terrain. The flight crew, who had been pre-occupied with the severe weather situation, ignored the alarm and did not execute recovery actions. First Officer Malik was noted as being "ignorant" of the alarms as he was busy with the communication between Flight 213 and the controller, instead of assisting the captain, who had been severely pre-occupied with the dangerous weather condition for quite some time.

As the flight crew managed to stabilize the aircraft, the autothrottle began to decrease thrust to maintain airspeed. The nose was pitched to 0 degree. However, a second, more powerful downdraft later hit the aircraft. The force of the downdraft caused the aircraft to descend rapidly. The crew still didn't carry out the correct recovery procedure. The autothrottle was still engaged and the aircraft was still in its landing configuration. The engaged autothrottle would have limited the thrust setting, while the landing configuration would have compromised the aerodynamics of the aircraft. The "Whoop whoop pull up" alarm then blared and the captain tried to pull the nose of the aircraft up. As the autothrottle had not been turned off, this did not have any effect and the thrust continued to decrease.

The downdraft suddenly dissipated in a rapid manner, causing the aircraft to violently pitch up. The limited thrust setting, landing configuration of the aircraft, and the rapid pitch up, subsequently caused the stall warning to activate. Alarmed by the warning, Captain Afridi immediately made a nose down input, reaching as high as 12 degree. The autothrottle was still not deactivated by the crew and hence the thrust remained at low setting, but the speed started to increase due to the steep dive. The aircraft was already at an unusually low altitude and the captain's decision to put the nose in a steep position caused the GPWS to sound.

Another alarm then sounded inside the cockpit. This time, the wind shear warning started to sound, simultaneously with the "Whoop whoop pull up" alarm. Overwhelmed, Captain Afridi then frantically tried to silence the warning by pressing the autopilot disconnect switch on his yoke. He then pulled the nose up again, but the stall warning began to sound once more as Captain Afridi's input caused the nose to exceed the critical angle of attack. The stick shaker warned the crew of the impending stall. First Officer Malik then could be heard yelling to the Captain to get out of the stall situation, but he did not take over the controls from the captain and did not make corrective actions.

During the entire chaotic situation, none of the crew made corrective inputs to recover the aircraft. A critical error from the crew was noted by investigators, as per the report:

The cockpit crew were observed till the aircraft ground impact, looking for some sort of refuge in automation, assuming that automation can get them out of these unsafe / prevalent adverse weather conditions.

The breakdown of the cockpit resource management and the crew who were unfamiliar with their aircraft eventually caused the aircraft to crash.

=== CRM breakdown ===
The cockpit situation was noted as being chaotic. Following the second downdraft, the cockpit resource management immediately collapsed. First Officer Malik was particularly noted for being "ignorant" and unhelpful to the unfolding situation. In several instances, he could be heard giving advice to his captain instead of taking over the control from him.

According to investigators, his actions were mainly caused by his relationship between him and Captain Afridi. Both pilots met for the first time in Pakistan Air Force Academy, with Captain Afridi as the flight instructor and First Officer Malik as a cadet. First Officer Malik had been paired with the captain since their employment with Shaheen Air International. During First Officer Malik's employment with the airline, Captain Afridi looked after him. When Captain Afridi decided to quit and join Bhoja Air, First Officer Malik followed him as well since he felt insecure and under confident with Captain Afridi's departure. The flight logbook revealed that, out of the 23 flights that had been carried out by him, a total of 16 were flown with the captain.

The investigation stated that Captain Afridi was seen as a fatherly figure to First Officer Malik. The two eventually became too comfortable with each other, preventing First Officer Malik to call out the captain's mistakes. Deviations from standard procedures were often not corrected and the first officer was also less likely to take over the control from the captain since he chose to rely on and to trust the captain's actions.

=== Oversight failure ===
The Boeing 737-200 and the Boeing 737-200 Advanced were completely different variants. The former was equipped with semi-automated flight deck, while the latter was fully automated. Civil Aviation Authority requested Bhoja Air to submit the ground schooling curriculum for cockpit crew of the Boeing 737-200 series. Bhoja Air Management claimed that all of their pilots had attended the required training. Bhoja Air did not know about the difference between the variants until the crew were sent abroad for their recurrent training. The ground schooling curriculum did not cover the training for flight deck automation for the Boeing 737-236A.

Captain Afridi had undergone his recurrent simulator training in a British Airways Comair facility in South Africa in January 2012. The flight instructor noted that the captain should be further trained on the aircraft's automation system as the system was considered to be relatively new by the captain. Several aspects were rated as "poor performance" and further training was needed. The South African instructor also recommended that Air include new Boeing recommended procedures for an automated aircraft. Prior to joining Bhoja Air, Captain Afridi had neither the experience nor exposure to an automated flight deck. During his training for the Boeing 737-200A aircraft, which was equipped with fully automated flight deck, wind shear and TAWS procedures were not included in the training by Bhoja Air and thus he was not trained for the correct recovery procedures in either wind shear condition or TAWS activation.

First Officer Malik did not undergo the six-monthly simulator training, which was planned to be carried out in February 2012 for an automated flight deck. The training program was eventually "extended" by Bhoja Air for another two months and their request was granted by CAA. As such, he also was not familiar with the correct recovery procedure for an automated flight deck.

As both the captain and the first officer were not trained on the automated flight deck of the Boeing 737-236A and the recovery procedures from wind shear condition and TAWS activation on said aircraft, the crew eventually made "fatal procedural mistakes". Due to the absence of such training, the captain sought refuge from the aircraft's automation to provide him a solution when he should have followed the recommended procedures from Boeing.

Multiple errors were discovered from Bhoja Air management and also from CAA officials. Several faults within the monitoring system and the training program of Bhoja Air potentially had enabled the crash. Bhoja Air had not provided the manual for the Boeing 737-200A, had not implemented any recommendations that had been given by the South African flight instructor, and had not established a monitoring system to track the cockpit crew's performance at organizational level.

The CAA inspector, who was responsible for Bhoja Air, was qualified but did not have any experience on the Boeing 737-200 and therefore they could not conduct an observation on the automated flight deck training. The simulator training in South Africa was not monitored by the CAA official. Further errors were discovered within the regulations. As per the licensing circular that had been issued by CAA in 2000, the CAA did not mandate training for the automated flight deck of the Boeing 737-236A.

=== Conclusion ===
Civil Aviation Authority released the final investigation report comprising 78 pages on 21 January 2015. The report found that the primary causes of the accident included the ineffective management by the cockpit crew of the basic flight parameters such as airspeed, altitude, descent rate, attitude, as well as thrust management. The report also found that the ineffective automated flight deck management in extreme adverse weather conditions by the cockpit crew caused the accident.

The pilots had inadequate flying experience, training and competence level in the aircraft. The inability of the CAA to ensure automated flight deck variance type training and monitoring requirements primarily due to incorrect information that had been provided by Bhoja Air was listed as one of the contributing factors to the crash.

== See also ==
- Delta Air Lines Flight 191
- Martinair Flight 495
- Eastern Air Lines Flight 66

== Notes ==
1. The METAR in force at the time of the accident was "OPRN 201300Z 23020KT 4000 TS FEW025CB SCT030 BKN100 25/15 Q1009.3/29.80". This translates as "METAR for Benazir Bhutto International Airport, issued on the 20th of the month at 13:00 Zulu Time. Wind from 230° at 20 knots (37 km/h; 23 mph). Visibility 4,000 metres (13,000 ft), thunderstorm occurring on station. Few clouds at 2,500 feet (760 m), cumulonimbus clouds present. Scattered clouds at 3,000 feet (910 m). Broken clouds at 10,000 feet (3,000 m). Temperature 25 °C (77 °F), dewpoint 15 °C (59 °F). Altimeter setting 1009.3 hPa / 29.80 inHg".
