= Airports Security Force =

Federal paramilitary agency of Pakistan

Airports Security Force ہوائی اڈوں کا محافظ دستہ
- ASF Emblem
- Abbreviation: ASF
- Motto: Firm & Courteous

Agency overview
- Formed: 1976; 50 years ago
- Employees: 14,560

Jurisdictional structure
- Operations jurisdiction: Pakistan
- Specialist jurisdiction: Buildings and other fixed assets

Operational structure
- Agency executive: Maj Gen Shoaib Bin Akram, (Director General)
- Parent agency: Ministry of Defence, Pakistan

Website
- asf.gov.pk joinasf.gov.pk

The Airports Security Force (ASF) (Urdu: ہوائی اڈوں کا محافظ دستہ) is a federal security agency under the administrative control of the Ministry of Defence which is responsible for protecting the airports, facilities and the aircraft (on-ground or in-air) in Pakistan. ASF safeguards the civil aviation industry against unlawful interferences, adopting counter terrorism measures, preventing crime and maintaining law and order within the limits of airports in Pakistan.

The current Director General of ASF is Major General Shoaib Bin Akram HI(M). The ASF is a 14,560-personnel organisation.

== History ==
The ASF was established in 1976 under the Airports Security Force Act LXXVII of 1975 initially as the Directorate of the Department of Civil Aviation. After the hijacking of Pakistan International Airlines Flight 326 in March 1981, sensing the contradictory requirements of security and facilitation, the Airports Security Force (ASF) was separated, and in December 1983, was placed under the folds of the Ministry of Defence.

Later, in 2013 under the umbrella of Cabinet Secretariat, an Aviation Division was created and Airports Security Force (ASF), Pakistan Civil Aviation Authority (CAA) and Pakistan International Airlines (PIA) came under the control of new division. The Aviation Division is headed by the Aviation Secretary of Pakistan. The ASF is mainly responsible for security of airports and aircraft.

== Subsidiaries ==
- ASF Schools and Colleges
- ASF Medical Centres
- ASF Land and Housing
- ASF Security Pvt Ltd

== Directors General (Former Force Commanders) ==
Since inception, ASF has always been headed by officers of Pakistan Armed Forces. Currently Major General ranked officers of Pakistan army heads organization for a term of three years.

Sr	Name of DG	From	To
1	GP Capt M.Y Khan	July 1976	April 1977
2	Brig Saleem Zia	April 1977	July 1977
3	Brig Muzaffar Ali Khan	July 1977	January 1980
4	Brig Saleem Zia	January 1980	October 1981
5	Brig Tariq Rafi	November 1981	November 1986
6	Brig Khawar Latif But	November 1986	December 1989
7	Brig Muneeb Ur Rehman Farooqui, SI(M)	December 1989	December 1992
8	Brig Rashid Ali Malik	December 1992	November 1996
9	Brig Manzoor Iqbal Bangesh	November 1996	March 1999
10	Brig Naveed Nasar Khan	1 April 1999	1 July 2002
11	Brig Javed Iqbal Sattar	27 June 2002	10 February 2006
12	Brig Fiaz Ahmed Satti	10 January 2006	30 March 2009
13	Brig Sahir Aslam Butt	30 March 2009	4 July 2011
14	Brig Muhammad Azam Tiwana	10 January 2011	29 December 2014
15	Maj General Sohail Ahmad Khan, HI(M)	September 2014	April 2017
16	Maj General Ali Abbas Hayder HI(M), S.BT	May 2017	29 September 2018
17	Maj General Zafar ul Haq, HI(M)	October 2018	23 May 2021
18	Maj General Abid Latif Khan HI(M)	June 2021	Oct 2022
19	Maj General Adnan Asif Jah Shad HI(M)	Nov 2022	November 2025
20	Maj General Shoaib Bin Akram HI(M)	November 2025	Present

== Ranks ==
Officers

Rank group	General officers		Senior officers
Airports Security Force
Airports Security Force	Major general میجر جنرل	Director بریگیڈیئر	Additional Director	Deputy Director	Assistant Director

Enlisted

Rank group	Junior commissioned officers			Non commissioned officers		Enlisted
Airports Security Force
Airports Security Force	Inspector انسپکٹر	Sub-inspector سب انسپکٹر	Assistant sub-inspector اسسٹنٹ سب انسپکٹر	Sergeant حوالدار	Corporal نائک

== See also ==
- Law enforcement in Pakistan
