= Aviation Division (Pakistan) =

Division of the Government of Pakistan

- ہوابازی تقسیم (پاکستان)

Agency overview
- Formed: June 2013
- Headquarters: Islamabad-44000, Islamabad Capital Territory
- Minister responsible: Khawaja Asif, Minister for Defence
- Agency executive: Mr Ahsan Ali Mangi (PAS), Aviation Secretary of Pakistan
- Parent agency: Cabinet Secretariat
- Website: Aviation Division

The Aviation Division (ہوابازی تقسیم (پاکستان)) was a key governmental division within Pakistan, operating under the auspices of the Government of Pakistan. It was overseen by the Federal Secretary of Aviation, who serves as its highest-ranking official.. The Aviation division was merged with Ministry of Defence in 2025.

== Organisation ==
=== Civil Aviation Authority ===
CAA is the regulatory authority, which oversees and regulates all aspects of civil aviation in Pakistan.

=== Pakistan Airports Authority ===
Created under the Pakistan Airports Authority Act of 2023, the authority manages, operates, and develops airports and air transport services across the country.

The establishment of the Pakistan Airports Authority is part of a larger plan to restructure the Civil Aviation Authority into distinct regulatory and operational entities.

=== Bureau of Air Safety Investigation (Pakistan) ===
The bureau's primary objective is to enhance the investigation process for accidents and incidents linked to aircraft navigation in Pakistan.

=== Airport Security Force ===
Primary law enforcement agency responsible for protecting the airports, their facilities and the aircraft.

=== Pakistan Meteorological Department ===
Pakistan Meteorological Department is tasked with observing and monitoring weather, climate, hydrology, seismology and geophysical matters and providing forecasts, alerts, public warnings, for purposes of protection, safety, and general information, along with research and development in related fields.

== See also ==
- List of airports in Pakistan
- Airlines of Pakistan
