= Civil Aviation Training Institute =

Coordinates: 25°22′45″N 68°22′06″E

Civil Aviation Training Institute (CATI) is located in Hyderabad, Sindh, Pakistan. The Civil Aviation Training Institute is a highly advanced Airport Operation maintenance facility. Hyderabad city is the centre of the famous Indus Valley civilization. Spread over an area of 100 acres (0.40 km^{2}), the Institute is located on the eastern banks of the historic Indus River, in the suburbs of Hyderabad city. It provides its students an educational environment unmatched in the region. It is approximately 180 km east of Karachi and is linked by a modern highway, a railroad and regular air service.

== History ==
Civil Aviation Training Institute was established in 1982 under the aegis of International Civil Aviation Organization (ICAO) and United Nations Development Programme (UNDP)

== Disciplines ==
Civil Aviation Training Institute (CATI) provides training in the disciplines of :

- Air Traffic Services
- Electronics Engineering
- Communication Operations
- Aviation Management & Administration
- Rescue and Fire Fighting Services
- Electromechanical Engineering

== See also ==
- Civil Aviation Authority
- Airlines of Pakistan
- Transport in Pakistan
