= Martinair Flight 495 =

1992 aviation accident in Portugal

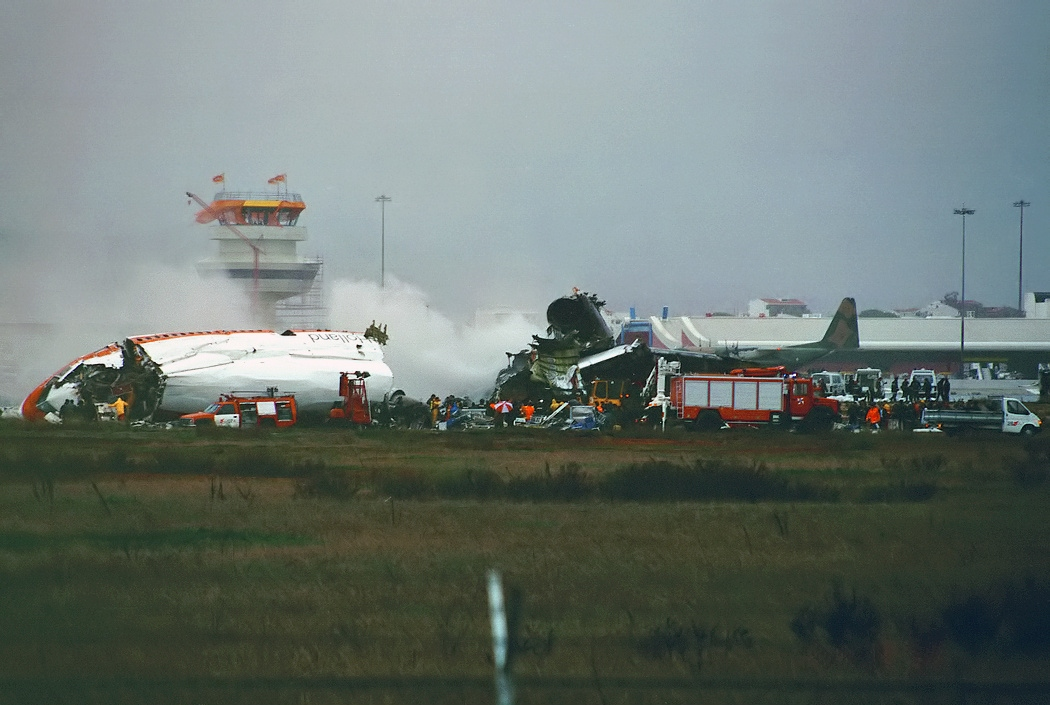
- Wreckage of the aircraft at Faro Airport

Accident
- Date: 21 December 1992
- Summary: Crashed on hard landing due to windshear and foggy weather
- Site: Faro Airport, Faro, Portugal; 37°00′46″N 7°57′53″W

Aircraft
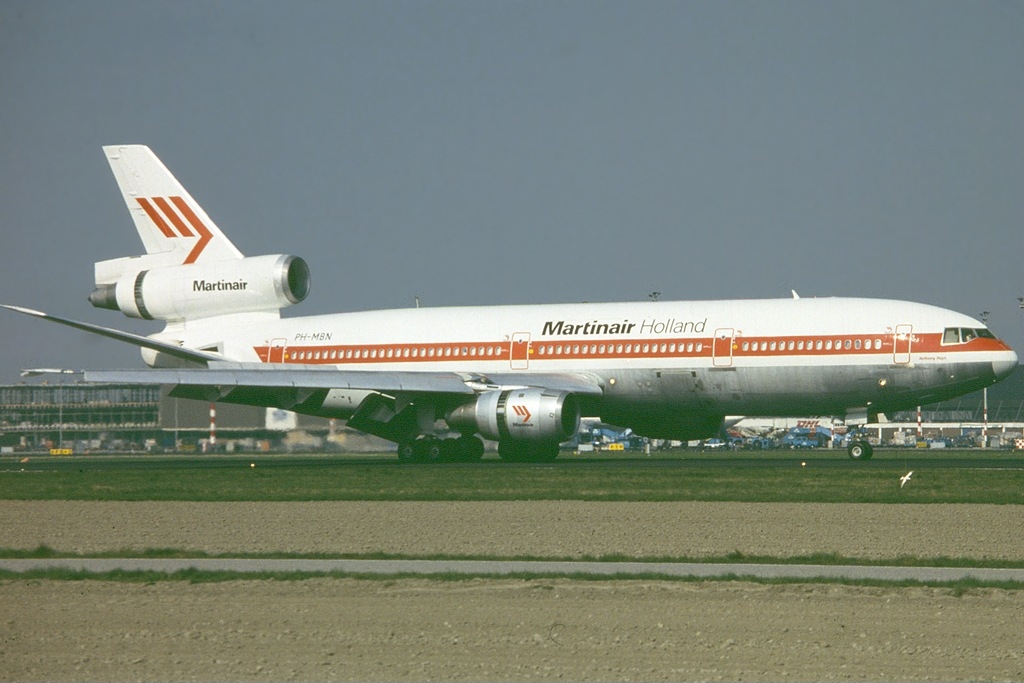
- PH-MBN, the aircraft involved in the accident, seen in 1991
- Aircraft type: McDonnell Douglas DC-10-30CF
- Aircraft name: Anthony Ruys
- Operator: Martinair
- IATA flight No.: MP495
- ICAO flight No.: MPH495
- Call sign: MARTINAIR 495
- Registration: PH-MBN
- Flight origin: Amsterdam Schiphol Airport
- Destination: Faro Airport
- Occupants: 340
- Passengers: 327
- Crew: 13
- Fatalities: 56
- Injuries: 106
- Survivors: 284

Martinair Flight 495 was a scheduled international flight operated by a McDonnell Douglas DC-10 that crash-landed in severe weather conditions at Faro Airport, Portugal on 21 December 1992. The aircraft carried 13 crew members and 327 passengers, mainly holidaymakers from the Netherlands. The crash killed 54 passengers and 2 crew members; 106 of the other occupants were badly injured.

== Background ==
=== Aircraft ===
The aircraft involved was a McDonnell Douglas DC-10-30CF, registered as PH-MBN, which was built in 1975 carrying the serial number 46924. It had logged 61,543 airframe hours in 14,615 takeoff and landing cycles. It was powered by three General Electric CF6-50C engines. The aircraft was named Anthony Ruys in honour of one of Martinair's former commissioners.

=== Crew ===
The captain was 56-year-old H. Willem van Staveren, who had been with Martinair since January 1968. He was a DC-10 flight instructor with a total of 14,441 flight hours. He previously served in the Royal Netherlands Navy from 1962 to 1966 and had worked for Schreiner Airways from 1966 to 1968.

The first officer was 31-year-old Ronald J. H. Clemenkowff. He had been with Martinair for three years with 2,288 flight hours, 1,787 of them on the DC-10.

The flight engineer was 29-year-old Gary W. Glans, who had been with Martinair for only eight months. He had worked for both Canadian Airlines and Swissair from 1988 to 1992. Glans had a total of 7,540 flight hours, including 1,700 hours on the DC-10.

All three pilots survived the crash.

== Accident ==
=== Departure ===
On the morning of the accident, the plane was delayed at Amsterdam Airport Schiphol due to a faulty thrust-reverser. This was not fixed. Nevertheless, the plane left for Faro at 04:52 UTC. According to Martinair, the faulty thrust-reverser was not a contributing factor in the accident.

=== Crash ===
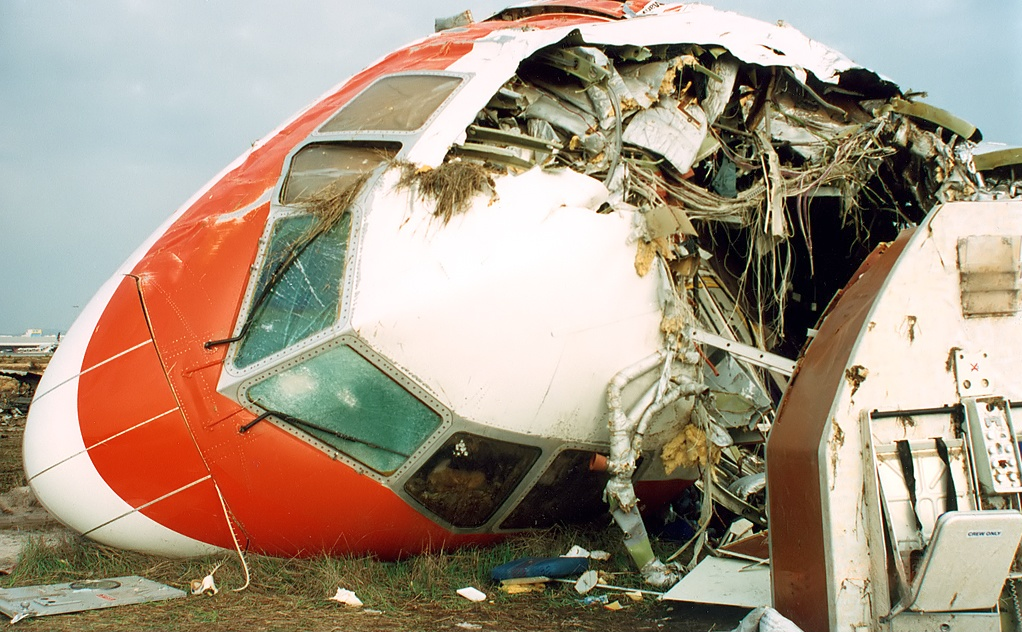
The cockpit section of PH-MBN.

A large thunderstorm had developed near Faro airport, accompanied by heavy rain, windshear and low cloud. The control tower informed the crew of the thunderstorm activity, in addition to stating that there was water on the runway. Following one unsuccessful landing attempt, the crew attempted a VOR/DME procedure approach to runway 11 (later runway 10), during which the aircraft flew through at least two microbursts. According to the Portuguese final accident report, firefighters saw an explosion coming from the aircraft 22 seconds before it crashed.

The aircraft made a hard landing with a vertical speed exceeding the manufacturer's design limits. Following this, the starboard main gear collapsed, the starboard wing separated from the fuselage and the starboard fuel tank ruptured and the contents ignited. The DC-10 fuselage split in two, coming to rest with the front section lying on its side.

=== Casualties ===
56 occupants were killed in the crash; 2 cabin crew and 54 passengers. Most of the dead were sitting between rows 20 and 29, above the ruptured fuel tanks, where the fire quickly engulfed the cabin. The report stated that there were no fatalities between rows 1 to 10 and 30 to 41. 106 others were severely injured, most of these injuries being burns.

== Causes ==
Opinions differ as to the cause(s) of this disaster.

=== Official investigation by Portuguese aviation authorities ===
According to the Portuguese aviation authority (DGAC), the cause(s) were likely to have been:

- high sink rate in the last phase of the landing approach;
- hard landing on the right landing gear, exceeding its structural limitations;
- transverse wind during the final approach and landing that exceeded the design limits of the landing gear, given the flooded condition of the runway;

The DGAC describes the following additional factors:

- instability of the landing approach;
- pilots' reducing throttle too early and allowing the aircraft to lose altitude in an unsafe manner;
- airport providing incorrect wind information for the approach;
- absence of an approach lighting system;
- incorrect assessment of the condition of the runway by the crew;
- overriding of the autopilot just before the landing, whereby the aircraft was flown manually in a critical phase of the landing;
- delay by the crew to increase altitude;
- decrease of the aircraft's lift coefficient due to heavy rainfall.

=== Dutch aviation authorities ===
The Dutch Office for the Investigation of Accidents and Incidents of the National Aviation Authority (RLD) indicated that the probable cause(s) could be as follows:

- a sudden and unexpected variation in wind direction and speed (windshear) in the last phase of the approach;
- a high descent speed and extreme lateral displacement that caused an excessive loading of the right landing gear that, in combination with a considerable angular displacement, exceeded the structural limitations of the aircraft.

According to the RLD, additional factors were:

- that the crew of flight MP495 did not expect the occurrence of windshear on the basis of the weather forecast and weather conditions;
- the premature reduction of engine power, most likely due to the action of the crew;
- the disabling of the autopilot just before landing, whereby the aircraft was manually flown in a critical phase of the landing.

=== 2011 research and lawsuits ===
On 14 February 2011, the Algemeen Dagblad reported, among other things, a new investigation that was carried out at the request of relatives by researcher Harry Horlings. According to Horlings, there was no wind shear at the Faro disaster and the pilots had made serious mistakes. Furthermore, the data from the black box was incomplete in the Dutch report from 1993; the last seconds were missing. In the cover letter to the report of the American Aviation Service, in which the data from the black box were presented, it was indicated that the autopilot had been used incorrectly. The report also recommended improving the training of pilots.

The Dutch Safety Board stated that it was unable to respond because the Council had not been able to view and assess the report from Horlings. Attorney Jan Willem Koeleman, who assisted some of the surviving relatives, announced that he would request Martinair to recognize liability and pay additional compensation. On 8 December 2012, Koeleman reported Martinair and the Dutch state to complain before the 21st of that month. After that date the case would be barred.

The case against Martinair, which had, in the meantime, become part of KLM, finally served on 13 January 2014 in Amsterdam. On February 26, 2014, the court rendered judgement, ruling that additional damages were not necessary.

The case against the state of the Netherlands served on 20 January 2014 in The Hague. On the same day on which the District Court ruled in Amsterdam, 26 February 2014, a decision was also made here by means of an interlocutory judgement. Unlike the court in Amsterdam, the court in The Hague deemed further investigation necessary and wished to hear experts.

In January 2020, the District Court of the Hague ruled that the Dutch state was partly responsible for the accident.

== News coverage ==
The disaster at Faro happened a few months after the crash of El Al Flight 1862, in an Amsterdam neighbourhood. Although the crash at Faro was more deadly, it received relatively little media attention.

Survivors felt that too little attention was being given to their experience from the crash. They united as the "Anthony Ruys Foundation", after the name of the aircraft, to engage with the media. This foundation was dissolved in May 2011.

On 16 January 2016, the Dutch current affairs program EenVandaag aired an episode about the disaster. In the broadcast, a former technical controller from Martinair stated that, sometime before the date of the flight and under great pressure from his supervisors, he had signed a form in which the replacement of a landing gear of the aircraft was postponed for a third time. Such a postponement could only be granted twice. The episode included an interview with attorney Jan Willem Koeleman, who assisted victims and survivors, detailing he had discovered that an archive of the Aviation Council should remain secret. CDA member of parliament, Pieter Omtzigt, called this "very inappropriate" and demanded that the government ask for clarification.

== In popular culture ==
The events of Martinair Flight 495 were featured in the 2022 episode "Peril over Portugal", of the Canadian documentary TV series Mayday.

== See also ==
- Bhoja Air Flight 213
- China Airlines Flight 642
- Delta Air Lines Flight 191
- Pan Am Flight 759
- USAir Flight 1016
- American Airlines Flight 1420
- United Nations Flight 834
- Aeroméxico Connect Flight 2431
- 1956 Kano Airport BOAC Argonaut crash
