= Durango International Airport =

International airport in Durango, Mexico

Durango International Airport Aeropuerto Internacional de Durango
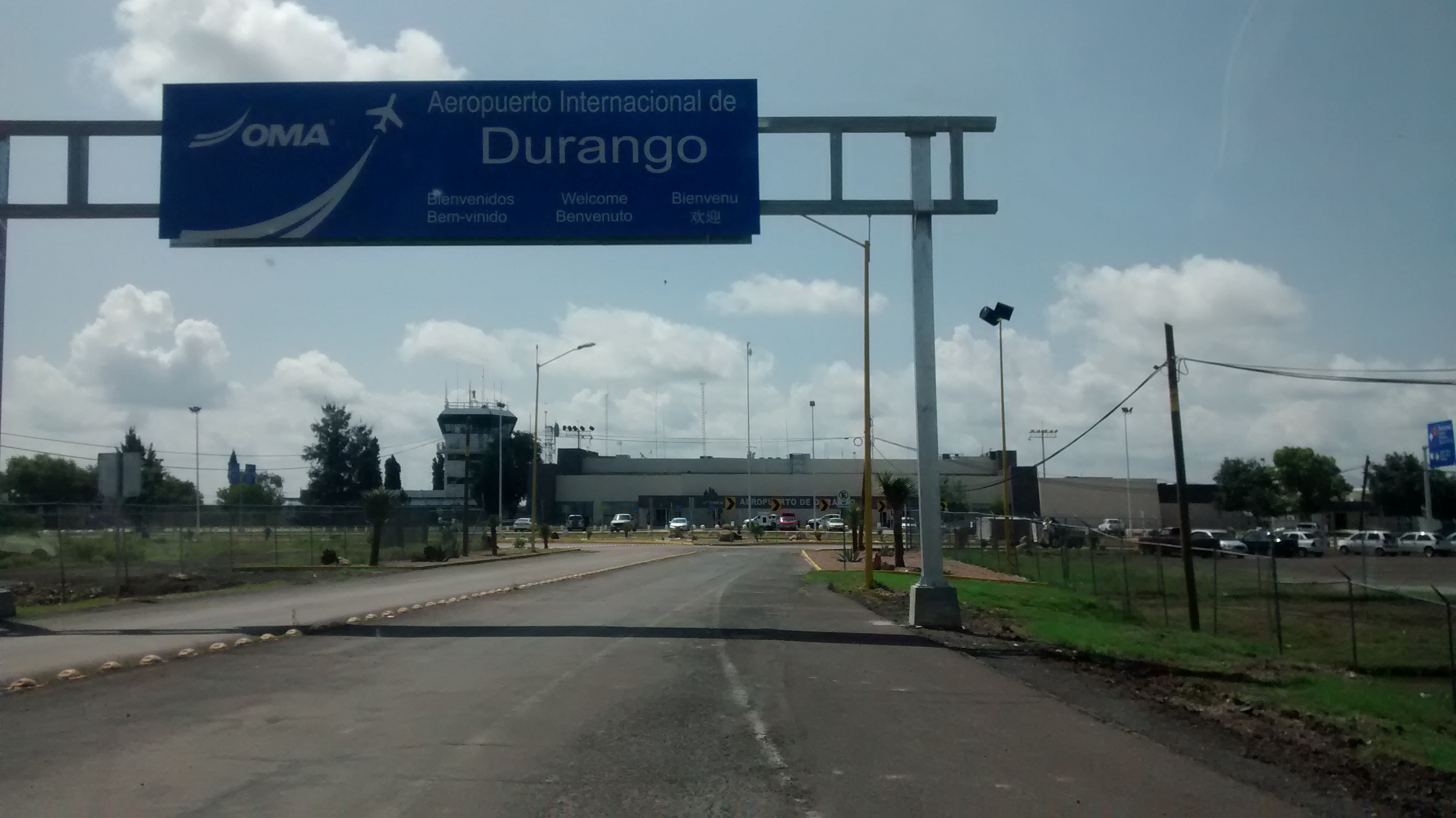
- IATA: DGO; ICAO: MMDO

Summary
- Airport type: Public
- Operator: Grupo Aeroportuario Centro Norte
- Serves: Durango, Durango, Mexico
- Time zone: CST (UTC-06:00)
- Elevation AMSL: 1,860 m (6,100 ft)
- Coordinates: 24°07′27″N 104°31′53″W
- Website: www.oma.aero/en/passengers/durango/

Map
- Location of the airport in Durango DGO (Mexico)

Runways
Direction	Length		Surface
Direction	m	ft	Surface
03/21	2,900	9,514	Asphalt

Statistics (2025)
- Total passengers: 569,657
- Ranking in Mexico: 37th ▲1
- Source: Grupo Aeroportuario Centro Norte.

Durango International Airport (Spanish: Aeropuerto Internacional de Durango); officially Aeropuerto Internacional General Guadalupe Victoria (General Guadalupe Victoria International Airport) (IATA: DGO, ICAO: MMDO) is an international airport situated in the city of Durango, Mexico. It manages national and international air traffic in the metropolitan area of Durango and the entire state of Durango. It also supports various tourism, flight training, executive, and general aviation activities. Operated by Grupo Aeroportuario Centro Norte (OMA), the airport is named after Guadalupe Victoria, the first President of Mexico. In 2024, the airport handled 534,993 passengers, increasing to 569,657 in 2025.

== Facilities ==
The airport is situated 17 kilometres (11 mi) northeast of the city center, at an elevation of 1,860 metres (6,100 ft) above sea level. It features one runway measuring 2,900 metres (9,500 ft) in length. The apron has four stands capable of accommodating narrow-body aircraft.

The passenger terminal offers typical services for a regional airport, including check-in facilities for both domestic and international flights, a VIP lounge, parking areas, car rental services, taxi stands, and a departure concourse with three gates providing direct access to the apron, allowing passengers to board their planes by walking to the aircraft. In 2008, the terminal building was expanded, and the apron and runway 03/21 were fully resurfaced, along with the taxiways.

Additionally, the airport hosts logistics and courier companies and features a dedicated general aviation terminal supporting various activities such as tourism, flight training, executive aviation, and general aviation.

== Airlines and destinations ==
=== Passenger ===
Airlines	Destinations
Aeroméxico Connect	Mexico City–Benito Juárez, Mexico City–Felipe Ángeles
Aerus	Monterrey
American Airlines	Dallas/Fort Worth
Viva	Monterrey
Volaris	Chicago–Midway, Guadalajara, Tijuana

=== Destination maps ===
Domestic destinations from Durango International Airport
Red = Year-round destination
Blue = Future destination
Green = Seasonal destination
International destinations from Durango International Airport
Red = Year-round destination
Blue = Future destination
Green = Seasonal destination

== Statistics ==
=== Annual Traffic ===
Passenger statistics at DGO
Year	Total Passengers	change %
2008	233,471	Steady
2009	213,394	▼8.60%
2010	217,230	▲1.80%
2011	227,131	▲4.56%
2012	241,946	▲6.52%
2013	235,952	▼2.48%
2014	255,937	▲8.47%
2015	315,835	▲23.40%
2016	424,415	▲34.38%
2017	395,905	▼6.71%
2018	418,914	▲5.81%
2019	527,004	▲25.81%
2020	271,231	▼48.54%
2021	446,030	▲64.45%
2022	485,524	▲8.86%
2023	513,246	▲5.71%
2024	534,993	▲4.24%
2025	569,657	▲6.48%

=== Busiest routes ===
Busiest routes from DGO (Jan–Dec 2025)
Rank	Airport	Passengers
1	Tijuana, Baja California	92,253
2	Mexico City–Benito Juárez, Mexico City	82,248
3	Dallas/Fort Worth, United States	34,878
4	Mexico City–Felipe Ángeles, State of Mexico	30,307
5	Chicago–Midway, United States	22,296
6	Monterrey, Nuevo León	4,918
7	Guadalajara, Jalisco	4,289
8	Ciudad Juárez, Chihuahua	602
9	Toluca, State of Mexico	42
10	Hermosillo, Sonora	7

== Incidents and accidents ==
- On 31 July 2018, Aeroméxico Connect Flight 2431, an Embraer 190 XA-GAL en route to Mexico City, crashed after take-off. The plane was carrying 99 passengers and 4 crew members. There were no fatalities

== See also ==
- List of the busiest airports in Mexico
- List of airports in Mexico
- List of airports by ICAO code: M
- List of busiest airports in North America
- List of the busiest airports in Latin America
- Transportation in Mexico
- Tourism in Mexico
- Grupo Aeroportuario Centro Norte
