= Pakistan Civil Aviation Authority =

Former regulatory authority for civil aviation in Pakistan, restructured in 2024

- مقتدرہ شہری ہوابازی پاکستان
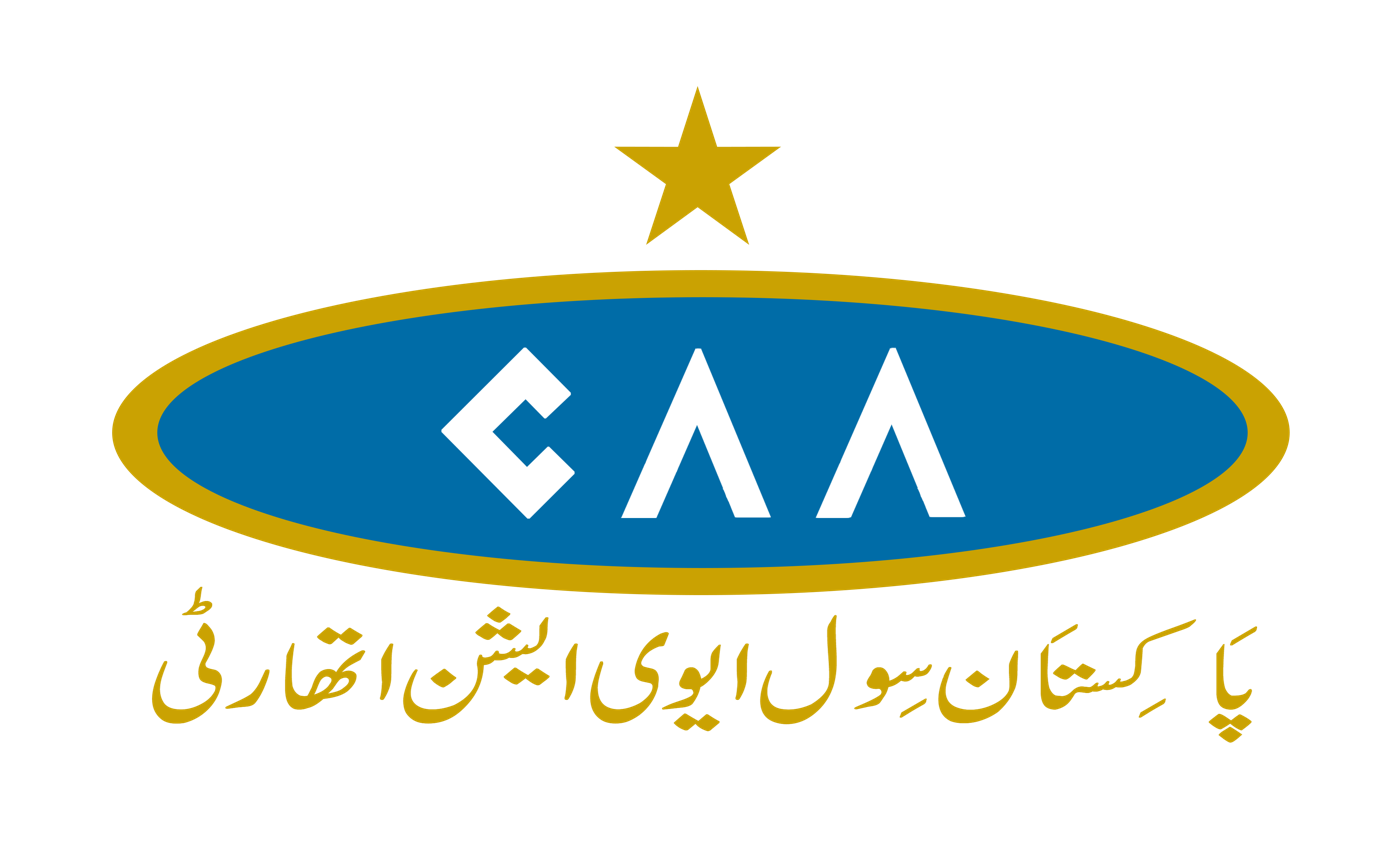

Agency overview
- Formed: 7 December 1982; 43 years ago
- Preceding agency: Civil Aviation Department (dissolved December 1982; 43 years ago)
- Dissolved: 9 August 2024; 2 years ago
- Superseding agencies: Pakistan Civil Aviation Authority; Pakistan Airports Authority; Bureau of Air Safety Investigation
- Jurisdiction: Government of Pakistan
- Headquarters: Jinnah International Airport, Karachi-75200
- Website: www.caapakistan.com.pk

The Pakistan Civil Aviation Authority (PCAA; Urdu: مقتدرہ شہری ہوابازی پاکستان) was an autonomous regulatory body established on 7 December 1982 under the Pakistan Civil Aviation Authority Ordinance 1982. It operated under the administrative control of the Secretary to the Government of Pakistan for Aviation and was a member of the International Civil Aviation Organization. The authority oversaw and regulated all aspects of civil aviation in Pakistan, with its head office situated at Terminal-1 of Jinnah International Airport in Karachi.

In 2023, parliament enacted the Pakistan Airports Authority Act 2023 and the Pakistan Air Safety Investigation Act 2023, providing the legislative basis for restructuring the PCAA. Effective 9 August 2024, the authority was formally restructured into three distinct entities: a reconstituted PCAA responsible for regulatory functions, the Pakistan Airports Authority (PAA) responsible for airport operations and infrastructure, and the Bureau of Air Safety Investigation (BASI) responsible for accident and incident investigations.

== History ==
Prior to the PCAA's creation, civil aviation in Pakistan was administered by the Civil Aviation Department (CAD) within the Ministry of Defence. Recognising that ministerial oversight had failed to keep pace with the needs of a rapidly expanding international civil aviation sector, the government established the PCAA on 7 December 1982 as an autonomous public-sector entity — a date that coincides with the founding of the International Civil Aviation Organization in 1944. The Ministry of Defence remained the controlling ministry until June 2013, when oversight was transferred to the Aviation Division of the Cabinet Secretariat.

== Organisational structure ==
The Civil Aviation Authority operated through the following divisions:

- Regulatory Division
- Airports & Operations Division
- Support Division

== Functions ==
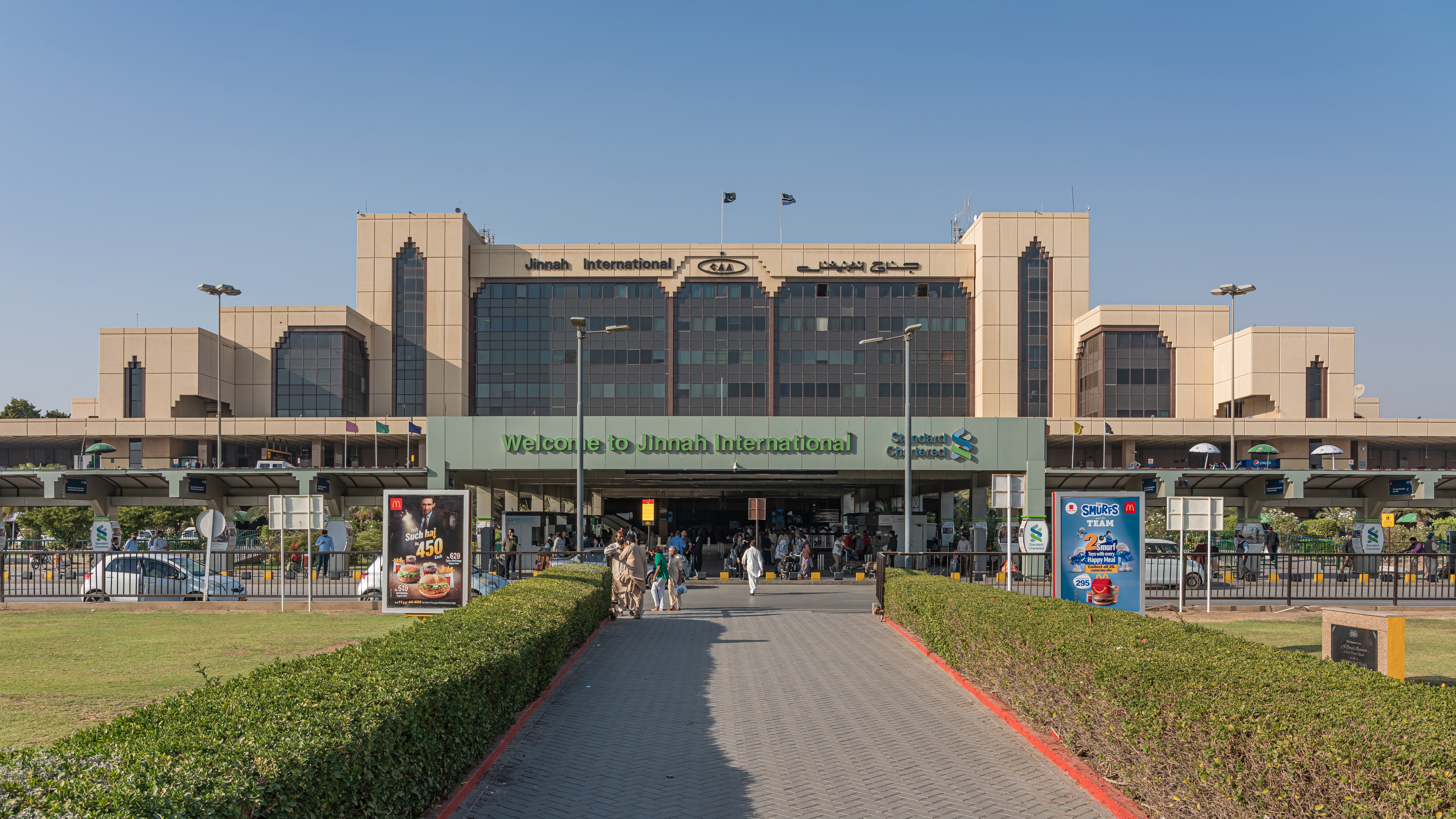
Jinnah International Airport, where the PCAA maintained its head office

The PCAA served simultaneously as the national aviation regulator and as a service provider for air navigation and airport services. Its core functions encompassed regulatory oversight, air navigation services, and airport services.

== Air traffic ==
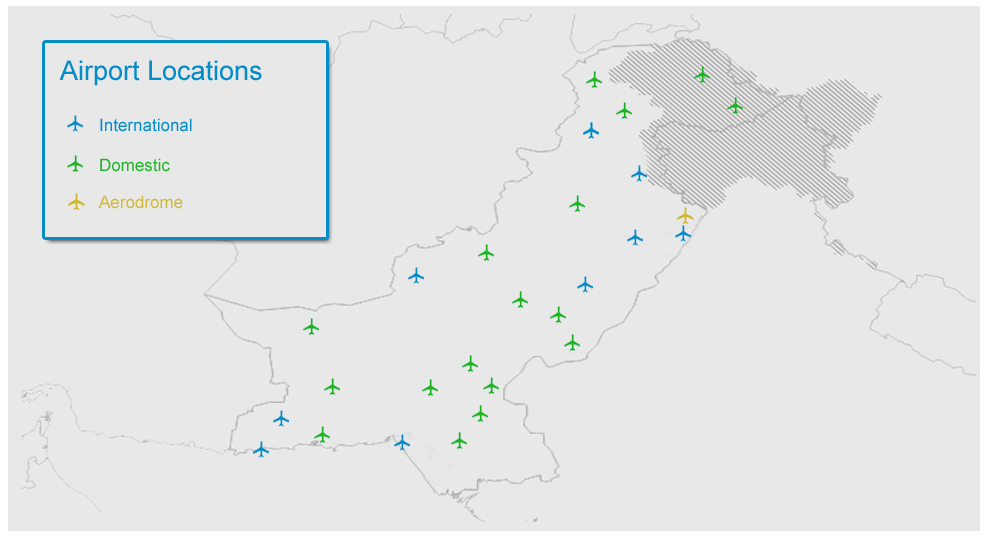
Map of airports in Pakistan

Pakistan's airspace is divided into two flight information regions (FIRs):

- Karachi Flight Information Region
- Lahore Flight Information Region

== Training ==
The Civil Aviation Training Institute (CATI), based in Hyderabad, operated under the Civil Aviation Authority. CATI is accredited by the International Civil Aviation Organization and is a member of the ICAO TRAINAIR PLUS Programme. The institute was established in 1982 to meet the training requirements of the PCAA and aviation authorities of the wider region.

CATI provided training in the following disciplines:

- Air Traffic Services
- Electronics Engineering
- Communication Operations
- Aviation Management and Administration
- Rescue and Fire Fighting Services
- Electromechanical Engineering

== Aircraft Accident Investigation Board ==
The Aircraft Accident Investigation Board (AAIB), operating under the Aviation Division of the Government of Pakistan, was responsible for investigating civilian aircraft accidents and serious incidents. The board was based in Rawalpindi and maintained a regional office in Karachi near Jinnah International Airport. Its functions were transferred to the newly established Bureau of Air Safety Investigation following the 2023 legislation.

=== Air crash investigations ===
The Aircraft Accident Investigation Board conducted the following investigations at the direction of the federal Government of Pakistan:

- PIA Flight 688, 10 July 2006
- Airblue Flight 202, 28 July 2010
- JS Air Flight 201, 5 November 2010
- Bhoja Air Flight 213, 20 April 2012
- PIA Flight 661, 7 December 2016
- PIA Flight 8303, 22 May 2020

== Controversies ==
=== Fraudulent pilot licence scandal ===
The crash of PIA Flight 8303 on 22 May 2020, which killed 97 people in Karachi, prompted a government review of pilot licensing. On 25 June 2020, Aviation Minister Ghulam Sarwar Khan informed the National Assembly that 262 of Pakistan's approximately 860 active pilots — around 30 per cent — had not sat their licensing examinations themselves, with the examinations taken by proxies on their behalf. More than half of the affected pilots were employed by Pakistan International Airlines (PIA), which immediately suspended 141 pilots pending further investigation.

On 1 July 2020, the European Union Aviation Safety Agency (EASA) suspended PIA's authorisation to operate in European Union member states for six months, citing concerns about the PCAA's capacity to ensure compliance with international safety standards. On 10 July 2020, the United States barred PIA flights from its airspace, and on 15 July 2020 the Federal Aviation Administration downgraded Pakistan's aviation safety rating under its International Aviation Safety Assessment programme, finding that the PCAA was not complying with ICAO safety standards. The EASA ban was lifted in November 2024.

A subsequent report estimated that PIA incurred losses exceeding PKR 200 billion as a direct consequence of the international flight bans triggered by the minister's statement.

== Restructuring (2023–2024) ==
Parliament enacted the Pakistan Airports Authority Act 2023, the text of which was published by the National Assembly of Pakistan, alongside the Pakistan Air Safety Investigation Act 2023. President Arif Alvi accorded assent to the Pakistan Air Safety Investigation Bill 2023 on 7 August 2023. A nine-member committee was subsequently constituted to divide the authority's assets, funds, and personnel among the successor entities.

The restructuring took formal effect on 9 August 2024, establishing three bodies in place of the former PCAA:

- A reconstituted Pakistan Civil Aviation Authority retaining regulatory functions, including flight standards, pilot licensing, airspace management, airworthiness certification, and air transport agreements;
- The Pakistan Airports Authority (PAA), responsible for operating and developing all commercial airports;
- The Bureau of Air Safety Investigation (BASI), responsible for investigating aircraft accidents and incidents.

== See also ==
- Airports Security Force
- Allama Iqbal International Airport
- Islamabad International Airport
- Jinnah International Airport
- List of airlines of Pakistan
- List of airports in Pakistan
- Pakistan International Airlines
- Pakistan Meteorological Department
