= Posts and Telecommunications Division =

- ডাক ও টেলিযোগাযোগ বিভাগ
- Seal of Posts and Telecommunications Division

Division overview
- Formed: 20 January 1972; 54 years ago
- Jurisdiction: Government of Bangladesh
- Headquarters: ICT Tower, Bangladesh Secretariat, Agargaon, Dhaka
- Division executive: Dr. Md. Mushfiqur Rahman, Secretary
- Parent department: Ministry of Posts, Telecommunications and Information Technology
- Website: www.ptd.gov.bd

The Posts and Telecommunications Division (Bengali: ডাক ও টেলিযোগাযোগ বিভাগ) is the government division responsible for post and telecommunication under the Ministry of Posts, Telecommunications and Information Technology in Bangladesh and is located in Dhaka, Bangladesh.

== History ==
During the term of Tarana Halim as state minister of the Ministry of Posts, Telecommunications and Information Technology, the Bangladesh Telecommunication Regulatory Commission under the Posts and Telecommunications Division of the ministry engaged in struggle over turf with the Information and Communication Technology Division of the same ministry in 2017. The dispute was regarding who had authority over the fiber optic network in Bangladesh. The dispute drew criticism from the Bangladesh Parliament.

== Constituent organisations ==
List of organisations and agencies under the division:

- Bangladesh Telecommunication Regulatory Commission
- Bangladesh Post Office
- Bangladesh Telecommunications Company Limited
- Bangladesh Submarine Cable Company Limited
- Teletalk Bangladesh Ltd
- Telephone Shilpa Sangstha
- Bangladesh Cable Shilpa Limited
- Department of Telecommunications
- Mailing operator and courier services licensing authority
- Bangladesh Satellite Company Limited
