= Md Shamsul Arefin =

Md Shamsul Arefin is a secretary and former head of the Information and Communication Technology Division. He was the senior secretary (coordination and reform) of the Cabinet Division. He was the chairperson of Startup Bangladesh Limited.

== Early life ==
Arefin did his bachelor's and master's in finance at the University of Dhaka.

== Career ==
Arefin joined the 11th batch of the Bangladesh Civil Service. In 1993, Arefin was the assistant commissioner of Manikganj District, his first posting in the Bangladesh Civil Service.

Arefin was secretary of the Anti-Corruption Commission. He was an additional secretary in the Cabinet Division. He was a director of the Rajdhani Unnayan Kartripakkha. He served as the deputy secretary of the Economic Relations Division.

Arefin was appointed secretary of the Information and Communication Technology Division in February 2023. He was the chairman of the Board of Directors of Startup Bangladesh Limited. He defend the poor functioning of Cyber Security Agency saying it would take more time to function.

Following the fall of the Sheikh Hasina-led Awami League government, a murder case was filed against Arefin over the death of a man during a protest against Hasina. Arefin was made an officer on special duty. Shish Haider Chowdhury, member of the Bangladesh Trade and Tariff Commission, was promoted and appointed to replace Arefin at the ICT Division.
