= Shish Haider Chowdhury =

Shish Haider Chowdhury is secretary of the Information and Communication Technology Division of the Muhammad Yunus led interim government. He is the chairperson of Startup Bangladesh Limited. He is a former member of the Bangladesh Trade and Tariff Commission under chairman Ahmed Munirus Saleheen.

== Early life ==
Chowdhury attended Dhanmondi Govt. Boys' High School and Dhaka College. He earned his bachelor's and master's degrees in accounting from the University of Dhaka. He completed an MBA at the Institute of Business Administration, University of Dhaka. He completed a master's degree in public economic management and finance at the University of Birmingham. He finished the National Defence Course at the National Defence College.

== Career ==
Chowdhury joined the 9th batch of the Bangladesh Civil Service on 26 January 1991 as an Audit and Accounts Cadre. He is a faculty member of the Institute of Business Administration, Jahangirnagar University. From 1997 to 2002, he worked at the International Jute Organisation on deputation from the government of Bangladesh.

In 2016, Chowdhury was elected general secretary of the Dhaka University Accounting Alumni Association. Chowdhury was a director of the Central Procurement Technical Unit. He is a faculty member of East West University and the BRAC Institute of Governance and Development of BRAC University.

Following the fall of the Sheikh Hasina-led Awami League government, Chowdhury was appointed secretary of the Information and Communication Technology Division replacing Md Shamsul Arefin. A murder case was filed against Arefin over the death of a protestor against former Prime Minister Sheikh Hasina. He was made an officer on special duty. He was a member, in the rank of additional secretary, of the International Cooperation Division of the Bangladesh Trade and Tariff Commission under chairman Ahmed Munirus Saleheen. He stated that the government would repeal the Cyber Security Act.
