= Loqman Husain =

Bangladeshi bureaucrat (1927–1981)

Executive Director of the Asia-Pacific Telecommunity
- In office 1 July 1979 – 27 April 1981
- Preceded by: Office established

Secretary of the Ministry of Posts, Telegraph and Telephone
- In office 17 April 1972 – 31 May 1976

Director General of the Bangladesh Telegraph and Telephone Department
- In office 17 December 1971 – 17 April 1972

Personal details
- Born: 1 April 1927 Panchbibi, Bogra District, Bengal Presidency, British India
- Died: 27 April 1981 (aged 54) Bangkok, Thailand
- Alma mater: Bengal Engineering College
- Profession: Telecommunications engineer, civil servant

Loqman Husain (1 April 1927 – 27 April 1981) was a Bangladeshi bureaucrat, telecommunications engineer, and international administrator. He was the first secretary of the Ministry of Posts, Telegraph and Telephone of Bangladesh, and later served as the first executive director of the Asia-Pacific Telecommunity (APT). He is considered an early architect of telecommunication network in Bangladesh.

== Early life ==
Husain was born on 1 April 1927 in Barmanika, Panchbibi, then part of Bogra District (now Joypurhat District), to Moulvi Chand Mia. He passed his matriculation from Bogra Zilla School in 1943 and completed his intermediate studies at Rajshahi College in 1945. In 1949, he earned a bachelor's degree in mechanical engineering from Bengal Engineering College in Shibpur.

== Career ==
Husain joined the Telegraph Engineering Service of Pakistan in 1951, later serving as general manager of the Telegraph and Telephone department in East Pakistan during the 1960s. In 1967, he contributed to establishing Telephone Shilpa Sangstha (TSS) in Tongi and Bangladesh Cable Shilpa Limited (BCSL) in Khulna as joint ventures with Siemens AG.

In July 1979, he became the inaugural executive director of the Asia-Pacific Telecommunity in Bangkok.

In March 1971, following the outbreak of the Bangladesh Liberation War, he renounced his Tamgha-e-Quaid-e-Azam award and was arrested by the Pakistan Army, remaining in custody until 17 December 1971. After independence, he served as the first director general of the Bangladesh Telegraph and Telephone department (1971–1972) and the first secretary of the Ministry of Posts, Telegraph and Telephone (1972–1976). In 1973, he signed Bangladesh's instrument of accession to the International Telecommunication Union.

In February 1976, at a United Nations ESCAP conference in Bangkok, Husain chaired the technical drafting committee that finalized the constitution of the Asia-Pacific Telecommunity (APT). He later became the organization's inaugural executive director in July 1979.

== Death and honors ==
Husain died in Bangkok, Thailand, on 27 April 1981 at the age of 54. In 1980, the French government made him a Chevalier of the Legion of Honour.
