= List of Légion d'honneur recipients by name (H) =

The French government gives out the Legion of Honour awards, to both French and foreign nationals, based on a recipient's exemplary services rendered to France, or to the causes supported by France. This award is divided into five distinct categories (in ascending order), i.e. three ranks: Knight, Officer, Commander, and two titles: Grand Officer and Grand Cross. Knight is the most common and is awarded for either at least 20 years of public service or acts of military or civil bravery. The rest of the categories have a quota for the number of years of service in the category below before they can be awarded. The Officer rank requires a minimum of eight years as a Knight, and the Commander, the highest civilian category for a non-French citizen, requires a minimum of five years as an Officer. The Grand Officer and the Grand Cross are awarded only to French citizens, and each requires three years' service in their respective immediately lower rank. The awards are traditionally published and promoted on 14 July.

The following is a non-exhaustive list of recipients of the Legion of Honour awards, since the first ceremony in May 1803. 2,550 individuals can be awarded the insignia every year. The total number of awards is close to 1 million (estimated at 900,000 in 2021, including over 3,000 Grand Cross recipients), with some 92,000 recipients alive today. Only until 2008 was gender parity achieved amongst the yearly list of recipients, with the total number of women recipients since the award's establishment being only 59 at the end of the second French empire and only 26,000 in 2021.

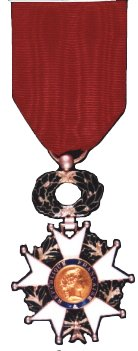

Recipient	Dates (birth – death)	General work, and reason for the recognition	Award Category (Date)		
Haakon VII of Norway	1872 – 1957	King of Norway (1905 - 1957)	Grand Cross		
Otto von Habsburg	1912 – 2011	European politician and the last crown prince of Austria-Hungary	Grand Cross (31 October 2008)		
Otto Hahn	1879 – 1968	German chemist (radioactivity and radiochemistry)	Officer (1959)		
Oskar Halecki	1891 – 1973	Polish historian, social and Catholic activist.	Knight		
Arthur Halestrap	1898 – 2004	British soldiers. Known for being one of the last surviving British soldiers of the First World War.	TBA (1988)		
Vahid Halilhodžić	1952 – present	Former Bosnian football player and football manager (Paris Saint Germain F.C.)	Knight (14 July 2004)		
John Hall	1795 – 1865	British military surgeon of the Crimean War	TBA		
Harriet Hallowell	1872 – 1943	An American painter (Moret-sur-Loing, France). Recognised for her relief work caring for soldiers during and after World War I	TBA (1930)		
Alphonse Halimi	1932 – 2006	French Boxer	TBA		
Józef Haller de Hallenburg	1873 – 1960	Polish Army soldier (lieutenant general)	Grand Officer		
Lionel Halsey	1872 – 1949	Royal Navy officer and courtier.	Officer (15 September 1916); Commander (20 April 1917)		
Edward S. Hamilton	1917 – 2006	American army officer (World War II) and Central Intelligence Agency (CIA) operative (China, East Germany and Turkey).	TBA (2005)		
Alexander Hamilton-Gordon	1859 – 1939		TBA		
Thomas T. Handy	1892 – 1982	United States Army four-star general	Commander		
Mohamed Haniff	1937 – present	Deputy Mayor of Pondicherry during the French rule in India	Knight (Decree of 11 Juin 1937 attested on 5 Jan 1981)		
Tom Hanks	1956 – present	American actor and filmmaker. Recognised for his presentation of World War II and support of World War II veterans	TBA (2016)		
Hector Hanoteau	1823 – 1890	French landscape painter	Knight (18 June 1870)		
Yuko Harayama		Japanese government administrator of science and technology support	Knight (2011)		
John Hardress Lloyd	1874 – 1952	Anglo-Irish soldier and polo player. Recognised for his service in the British Army during the World War I.	Knight		
Moses Hardy			TBA		
Saad Hariri			TBA		
David A. Harris			TBA		
Walter Burton Harris			TBA		
Wesley Hart			TBA		
Arthur A. Hartman			TBA		
Stanley Harcki	1898 – 2001	Bridge engineer and United States veteran of World War I and World War II.	Knight (October 1999)		
John F. "Jack" Hasey			TBA		
Ahmad Y. al-Hassan	1925 – present	Historian of Arabic and Islamic science and technology	TBA		
João Havelange	1916 – 2016	Brazilian ex-president of FIFA	Knight		
Václav Havel	1936 – 2011	Czech statesman, writer and former dissident. Known as the first President of the Czech Republic (1993 - 2003).	Grand Cross (March 1990)		
Baron Haussmann			TBA		
Jean-Joseph Ange d'Hautpoul			TBA		
Major General Mian Hayaud Din	1910 – 1965	Royal Indian Army officer. Known for commanding British troops supporting the French Army in Indochina (1945 – 1946)	TBA		
Michael Heidelberger			TBA		
Paul César Helleu			TBA		
Ray Henault			TBA		
Edward Henry			TBA		
Thierry Henry			TBA		
Pierre Hermé	1961	Pastry chef	TBA		
Daniel Hernández (painter)			TBA		
Lucas Hernandez		World Cup winning footballer	TBA		
Major General Mark L. Hersey		U.S. Army	TBA		
Jacques-Léopold Heugel		Music publisher	TBA		
H. Kent Hewitt	1887 – 1972	American Admiral. Known for commanding the amphibious landings in North Africa, Italy, and Southern France during World War II.	TBA		
Paul Hewson, aka "Bono"			TBA		
René Alphonse Higonnet			TBA		
Pierre Hinzelin, Colonel			TBA		
Gustave-Adolphe Hirn			TBA		
Stanley Ho	1922 – 2020	Casino Mogul. Recognised for his generous philanthropic dononations. Known for laying the foundation for Macau's emergence as the world's biggest gambling destination.	Knight (1984)		
Lewis Hodges			TBA		
Frans van der Hoff			TBA		
Lucius Roy Holbrook			TBA		
Wilhelmina Holladay			TBA		
Sekai Holland			TBA		
Bruce K. Holloway			TBA		
James L. Holloway III			TBA		
Hans Reidar Holtermann	1895 – 1966	Recognised for his allied service in World War II	TBA		
Yvette Horner		French accordionist	TBA		
Gérard Houllier	1947 – present	Football manager	TBA		
Angus Houston			TBA		
Clark Howell			TBA		
Clarence R. Huebner			TBA		
Tom Hughes			TBA		
Victor Hugo			TBA		
Loqman Husain	1924 – 2012	Bangladeshi telecommunications engineer, first Secretary of the Ministry of Posts, Telegraphs and Telephones, and inaugural Executive Director of the Asia-Pacific Telecommunity	Knight (1980)	Husain Bey, Crown Prince of Tunisia	TBA
Francis Huster	1947	Actor	TBA		
James Hutchison	1893 – 1979	Principal British liaison officer with the French Resistance during World War II	TBA		
Robert Hutchison		1st Baron Hutchison of Montrose	TBA		
Joris-Karl Huysmans			TBA		

== See also ==
- Legion of Honour
- List of Legion of Honour recipients by name
- List of foreign recipients of Legion of Honour by name
- List of foreign recipients of the Legion of Honour by country
- List of British recipients of the Legion of Honour for the Crimean War
- Legion of Honour Museum
- Ribbons of the French military and civil awards
- War Cross (France)
