= E-commerce in Bangladesh =

National industry

E-commerce in Bangladesh refers to the electronic commerce sector of Bangladesh business.

== History ==
In 2009 Bangladesh Bank approved online payment and in 2013 the bank approved the use of debit and credit card for online payment. The eCommerce Association of Bangladesh is the trade body for eCommerce in Bangladesh. According to the association, there are 8,000 eCommerce pages in Facebook alone. The growth of the industry has been inhibited by low usage of credit and debit cards, and the unavailability of PayPal. In 2016 the government of Bangladesh opened eCommerce sites for every district in the country. The same year, FBCCI recommended removal of tax on eCommerce.

== Volume ==
There are a number of free classified websites and online shopping marketplaces in Bangladesh. According to Prothom Alo in 2014, about 1.5 to 2 million people shopped online every year, and the market was growing by 15% to 20%. According to MetrixLab, in 2014, internet users in Bangladesh had 1 billion used goods in their stocks worth BDT 14,700 crore (US$1.9 billion as of 2014). According to the Bangladesh Bank, around 1 million clients accessed mobile banking, and over 100 crore transactions were made through mobile banking accounts by 2014. Transactions worth about BDT 1,000 crore (US$123 million as of 2017) have been made annually through e-commerce in 2017. Mobile financial services in Bangladesh have grown substantially, with transaction volumes reaching trillions of taka annually, reflecting the expansion of digital payments that support e-commerce.

E-commerce in Bangladesh has grown rapidly due to increased internet penetration (over 131 million users), smartphone usage, and a rising middle class with higher disposable incomes. The market, valued at USD 6.5 billion in 2022, is projected to grow at a 17% CAGR, with major players including Daraz [bn], AjkerDeal, Chaldal, Evaly and Pickaboo.

== E-commerce by sector ==
Currently, the following four types of eCommerce are popular in Bangladesh:

- Business-to-business (B2B)
- Business-to-consumer (B2C)
- Consumer-to-consumer (C2C)
- Business-to-employees (B2E)

=== Business-to-business ===
There are number of company that offer office supplies, stationery, computers, cleaning, chemical for other companies.

=== Business to consumers ===
The Business-to-consumer segment grew through the growth of home-delivery of food. There are other companies based on Facebook that allow people in Bangladesh to buy products from the United States, the United Kingdom and India. The majority of the transactions are carried out through cash on delivery. A wide list of business like Daraz, already hitting the booming B2C e-commerce business model including social commerce where entrepreneurs uses Facebook or Instagram to sell to customers.

=== Consumer to consumer ===
There are a number of companies that act as classifieds, including Bikroy.

=== Business to employee ===
There are a number of websites that host information about jobs in Bangladesh.

=== Digital marketing ===
Digital marketing is a recent sector that has experienced rapid growth. Since 2014 twenty companies have started as the nation's digital marketplace emerges. Unlike traditional marketing, digital marketing involves strategies designed to engage consumers and drive brand conversation on various digital platforms.

The digital marketing industry in the nation has not matured, with consumers having a low online literacy rate. The industry has doubled in size due to increase to mobile transactions, an estimated 70 billion taka are transferred through mobile phones every month. Bangladesh has the tenth-largest mobile phone user base in the world and has sixty million internet connections. Zunaid Ahmed Palak the state minister for ICT in the Best of Global Digital Marketing World Tour 2016 which was held in Dhaka, "I am happy to say that from today we will speak about digital marketing as being an essential part of Digital Bangladesh." Bangladesh has sixty-five million internet users, about forty percent of the population. A Digital Marketing Summit is organized annually since 2013 by the Bangladesh Brand Forum.
