= Ahmed Munirus Saleheen =

Ahmed Munirus Saleheen is a former senior secretary of the Ministry of Expatriates Welfare and Overseas Employment. He is the former chairman of the Bangladesh Trade and Tariff Commission. He is the former chairman of the Probashi Kallyan Bank.

== Early life ==
Saleheen completed his bachelor's and master's in English at Jahangirnagar University. He completed his PhD at Flinders University. He is a graduate of the Hubert H. Humphrey Fellowship Program of the United States Department of State. He was a lecturer of English at Jahangirnagar University.

== Career ==
Saleheen joined the 9th batch of Bangladesh Civil Service in 1987.

Saleheen served as an additional secretary of the Ministry of Labour and Employment in 2019. He was an additional secretary of the Ministry of Expatriates Welfare and Overseas Employment.

Saleheen was appointed Secretary of the Ministry of Expatriates Welfare and Overseas Employment, replacing Salim Reza in April 2020. He worked to provide financial support to Bangladesh expatriate workers in Saudi Arabia facing quarantine during the COVID-19 pandemic and ensure their access to vaccines. He worked on the launch of the "Ami Probashi" app under Bureau of Manpower, Employment and Training.

In May 2024, Saleheen negotiated with Japan over trade deals as the chairman of the Bangladesh Trade and Tariff Commission.

After the fall of the Sheikh Hasina led Awami League government, Saleheen was made an officer on special duty along with Mohammad Salahuddin, secretary of the Prime Minister's Office, and Zahidul Islam Bhuiyan, managing director of Biman Bangladesh Airlines Limited. In September 2024, a human trafficking case was filed against him and 102 others including Imran Ahmed, Minister of Expatriates' Welfare and Overseas Employment, Nizam Uddin Hazari, Masud Uddin Chowdhury, the wife and daughter of the former Minister of Finance AHM Mustafa Kamal.
