= Doel (disambiguation) =

Doel is a village in northern Belgium.

Doel may also refer to:

- Doel (computer), a laptop for students in Bangladesh
- Doel Nuclear Power Station, Belgium

== People with the name Doel ==
- Doel Reed (1894–1985), American painter, printmaker, and educator
- Frances Doel (1942–2025), British screenwriter
- Frank Doel (1908–1968), British antiquarian bookseller, famed for 84 Charing Cross Road
