= Dublar Char =

Island in Bangladesh

দুবলার চর
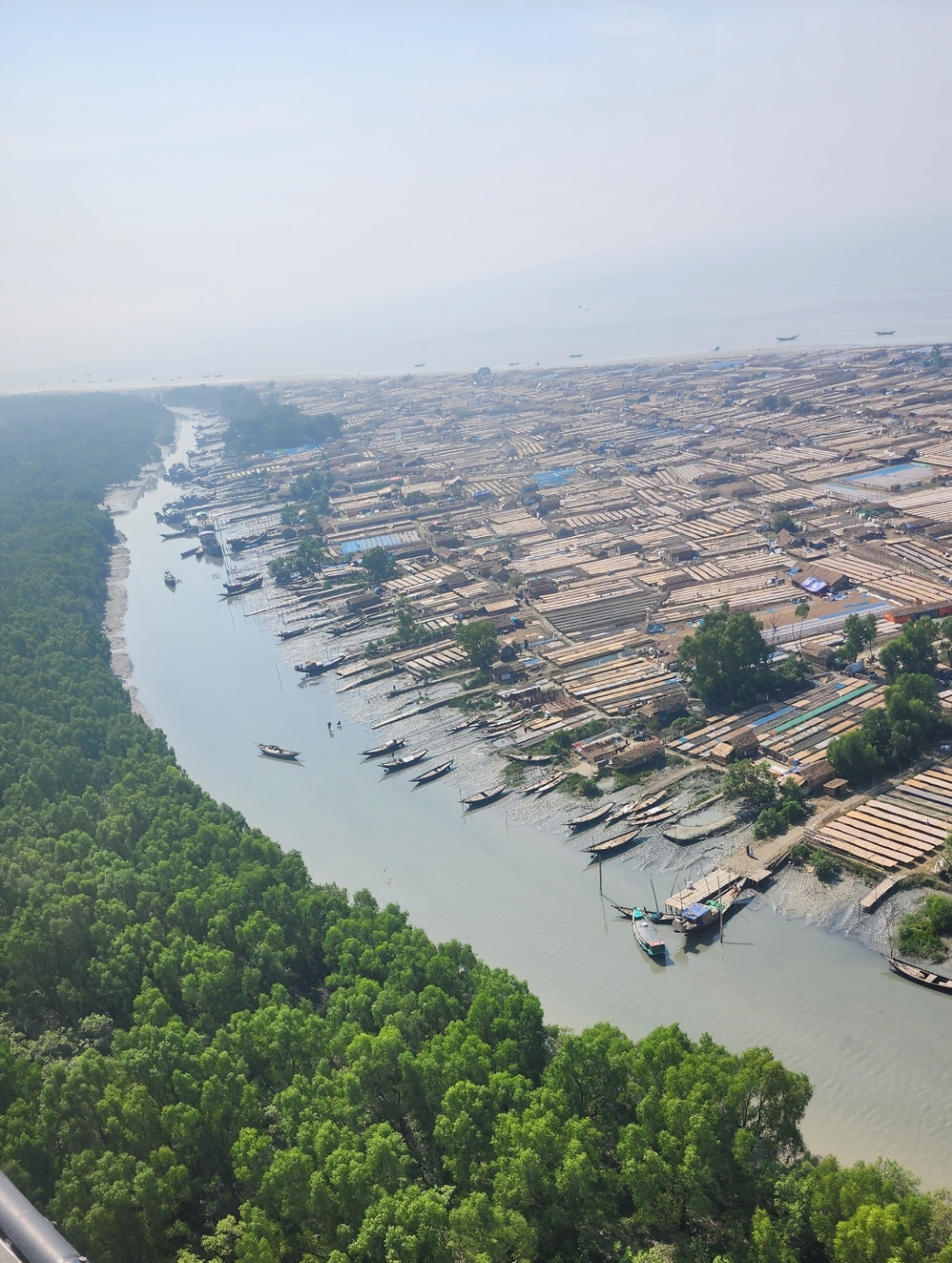

- Location within Bangladesh

Geography
- Location: Bay of Bengal
- Coordinates: 21°43′22″N 89°36′10″E
- Area: 66.5 km^{2} (25.7 sq mi)
- Length: 15 km (9.3 mi)
- Width: 5.5 km (3.42 mi)

Administration
- Bangladesh
- Division: Khulna Division
- District: Bagerhat District

Demographics
- Population: 3000 (2020)
- Languages: Bengali
- Ethnic groups: Bengalis

Dublar Char is an island in Bangladesh with an area of 66.5 km^{2}, located in the Bagerhat District of the Khulna Division. It's a tourist destination within Sundarban. Fishermen live here during the fishing season for three to four months and have demanded a floating hospital from the Government of Bangladesh. The island hosts a Raas Mela (fair) annually.

== Industry ==
Dublar Char is a seasonal fishing village located on the southern edge of the Sundarbans, near the Bay of Bengal, and is particularly renowned in Bangladesh for dried fish production. Every year, from October to March after the monsoon season, thousands of fishermen from various parts of the country, such as Khulna, Bagerhat, Satkhira, Pirojpur, Chattogram, and Cox's Bazar, temporarily settle here. These fishermen primarily engage in fishing and dried fish processing. To obtain fishing permits, they follow the regular procedures of the Sundarbans East Forest Division, which include acquiring a BLC (Boat License Certificate) and paying a DFC (Daily Fee for Firewood). Dublar Char is the largest dry fish processing site in the Sundarban region.

In places like Meherali Khal, Alorkol, Majher Char, Narikelbari, Manikkhali, and Shalar Char, fishermen establish settlements. Fish such as Bombay duck, ribbon fish, knife fish, shrimp, anchovy, and pomfret are dried as part of the processing. After being caught, the fish are sorted and left to dry, which typically takes three to five days. The dried fish are then sent to Chattogram's Asadganj wholesale market, from where they are distributed across the country.

This dried fish industry plays a significant role in the local economy. The production and supply process generate substantial government revenue. In the fiscal year 2018–19, 4,105 tons of dried fish were produced in this region, earning the government revenue of 26.8 million Bangladeshi Taka. In the fiscal year 2022–23, production increased to 5,100 tons, and revenue rose to 66.8 million Bangladeshi Taka.

Approximately 35,000 people are directly involved in this seasonal activity at Dublar Char. To meet the daily needs of the fishermen, temporary markets are set up in the area, offering food, clothing, and daily necessities. These temporary villages also have limited electricity provided by generators. However, the lack of drinking water and healthcare remains a major challenge for the people living here.

Labor activists have accused the fishermen of using child labor on the island. On 8 November 2004, the Bangladesh Coast Guard rescued 93 boys between the ages of 7 and 12 who were used as slave labor by the fishermen.

== Raas Dance ==
The island is also famous for the annual Raas Mela and holy bath, which take place during the Kartik month (Gregorian November) as part of the Hindu tradition. While it is often said that the Raas Mela has been celebrated for 200 years, historical accounts suggest that the festival was initiated in 1923 by a forest-dwelling devotee of Harichand Thakur, named Haribhajan (1829–1923).

Every year, numerous pilgrims visit the island during Raas Purnima to take a holy dip in the sea. Devotees greet the sunrise by floating fruits on the ocean's waters. Some enliven the atmosphere by playing musical instruments and singing bhajans and kirtans, filling the surroundings with spiritual fervor. The Raas Mela at Dublar Char attracts not only local residents but also people from distant cities and even foreign tourists. This three-day festival sees enthusiastic participation, including a significant number of international visitors.

== Economy ==
There is a market in Dublar Char named the Dublar Char New market.

=== Banking and telecommunication ===
There are no physical branches of any banks present. But mobile banking agents of bKash, nagad, SureCash and TeleTalk TelePay are available. Mobile banking agents run their business based on Teletalk Network because only Teletalk Internet and Mobile Network is available here.

== Wildlife ==
Hydrophis nigrocinctus, a species of black-banded sea snake, was rediscovered in bycatch after being unseen for over a century, on this very island. The specimen was found in February 2015, and it was published in May 2024.

== See also ==
- List of islands of Bangladesh
- Raas Dance
