= Bangladesh National Portal =

National portal of Bangladesh

- Official logo

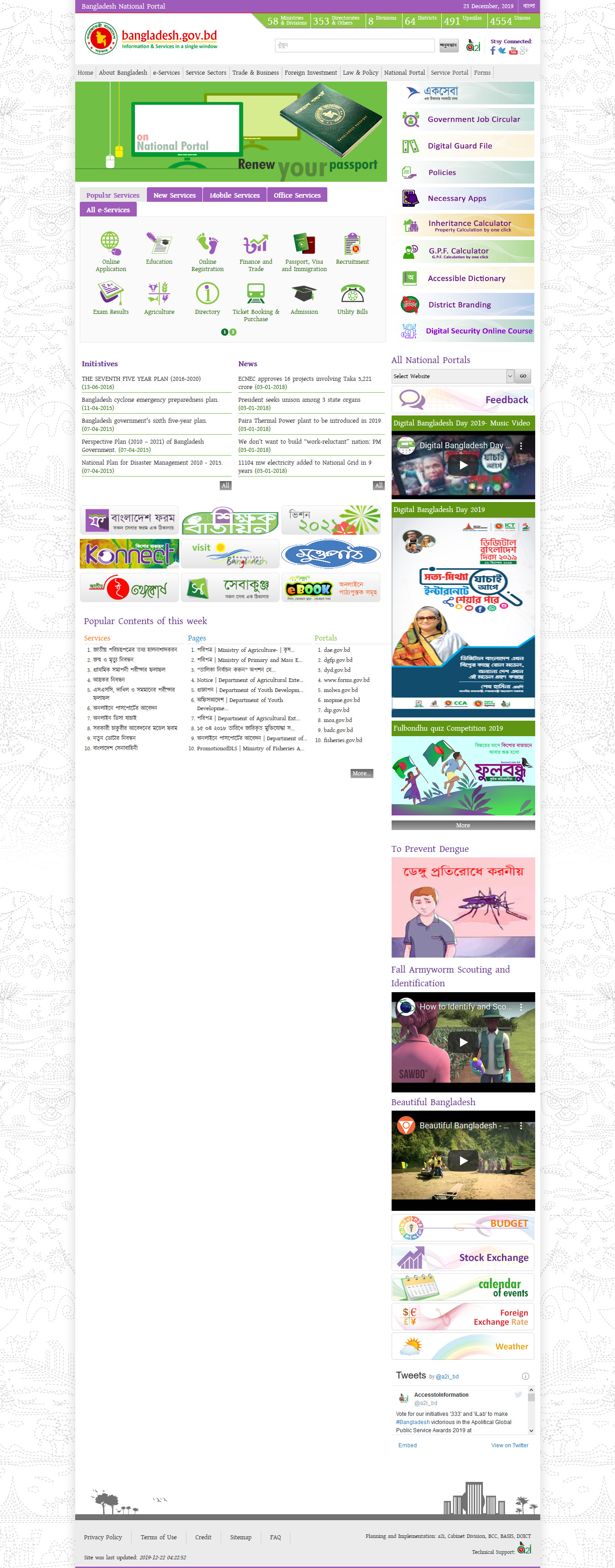
- Screenshot Main page
- Website type: Government information portal
- Available in: Bengali & English
- Owner: Government of Bangladesh
- Website: bangladesh.gov.bd
- Commercial: No
- Registration: N/A
- Launched: 7 March 2015; 11 years ago
- Current status: Online

Bangladesh National Portal is a national portal of the People's Republic of Bangladesh under Access to Information programme run by the Prime Minister's Office of Bangladesh. The information portal aims to provide information about all national unions, upazilas, districts and divisions of the country.

== History ==
Over 25,000 websites were included when it started on 7 March 2015.
