= Tofazzal Hossain (civil servant) =

- Born: 9 October 1935
- Died: 5 December 2015 (aged 80)
- Education: Dhaka University
- Awards: Ekushey Padak (2013)

Tofazzal Hossain (5 October 1935 – 5 December 2015) was a Bangladeshi language activist, civil servant, journalist, poet, lyricist and writer. He was conferred with Ekushey Padak in 2013 for his contribution to the Language Movement.

== Biography ==
Hossain was born on 9 October 1935 at Rameshwar in Daudkandi of Comilla. He received graduate and postgraduate studies from Dhaka University. Besides his professional career he also wrote books.

Hossain started his career in journalism at The Daily Ittefaq as a sub editor. Later, he joined the government service in 1967. He was an additional chief information officer of the Information Department.

Hossain took part in the Language Movement as a poet and lyricist. He also took part in protest rallies, poster and wall writing. Two songs were included on an anthology Ekushey February which was edited by Hasan Hafizur Rahman. A song of these was written by Hossain. The title of the song was "Rokto Sorone Tomra Ajike Tomake Soron Kori". He received Ekushey Padak in 2013 for his contribution to the Language Movement. He was a fellow of Bangla Academy.

Hossain died on 5 December 2015 at the age of 80.

== Selected bibliography ==
=== Poetry ===
- Hridoy Roktorage
- Ekush Vubonmoy
- Notun Juger Vore
- Kobita Somogro

=== Research book ===
- Jonosongkhya Bisforon O Agami Prithibi
- Shishu : Bishwa O Bangladesh Prekshapoth
- Biponno Prithibi Biponno Jonopod
- Kashmir : Itihas Kotha Koy
- Safolyer Sondhane
- Jatisongho Ebong Lyndon Johnson
