= Cyber Security Agency (Bangladesh) =

Bangladeshi security and intelligence agency

- Government Seal of Bangladesh

Agency overview
- Formed: 2019
- Jurisdiction: Bangladesh
- Headquarters: Dhaka, Bangladesh
- Agency executive: Dr.Md. Taibur Rahman, Director General
- Parent department: Information and Communication Technology Division
- Parent agency: National Cyber Security Council
- Website: ncsa.gov.bd

Cyber Security Agency, formerly Digital Security Agency, (Bengali: ডিজিটাল নিরাপত্তা এজেন্সি) is a Bangladesh government security and intelligence agency responsible for monitoring online communication and countering cyber crimes.

== History ==
Digital Security Agency was established under the Information and Communication Technology Division, Ministry of Posts, Telecommunications and Information Technology. Md. Rezaul Karim, ndc is the former Director General of the agency, he was the Second Director General of this agency.

After the enactment of the Cyber Security Act, 2023, the Digital Security Agency was renamed to Cyber Security Agency.
