= Bogura Zilla School =

- বগুড়া জিলা স্কুল

Location
- Satmatha, Bogura; 5800; Bangladesh; 24.8481°N 89.3740°E

Information
- Type: Public
- Motto: শিক্ষার উদ্দেশ্য মনুষ্যত্ব অর্জন (To Learn Is To Earn Humanity)
- Established: 1853; 173 years ago
- School board: Rajshahi
- School district: Bogura
- Headmaster: Md. Anwar Hossain
- Staff: 10
- Teaching staff: 53
- Grades: 3 to 10 (SSC)
- Gender: Male
- Age: 07 to 17
- Enrollment: 2000
- Campus type: Urban
- Colors: White, blue
- Sports: Football, cricket
- Nickname: BZS
- Publication: Unmesh (Yearly School Magazine)
- Website: bograzillaschool.edu.bd

Bogura Zilla School (Bengali: বগুড়া জিলা স্কুল) is a public high school located in Bogra, Bangladesh. Established in 1853, it is one of the oldest high schools in the country. It provides education from class three (grade-3) to class ten (grade-10). It was a private English medium school before becoming a public school.

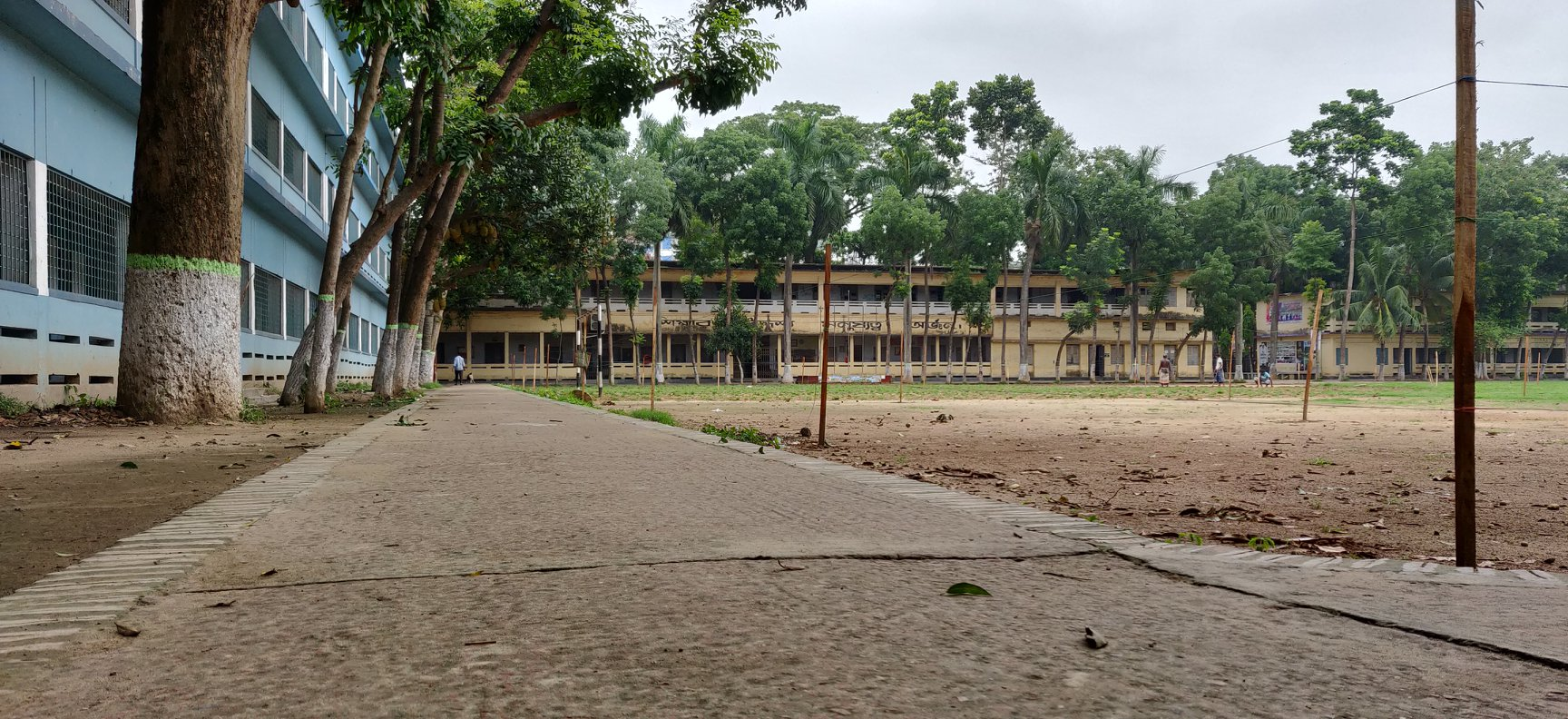
Academic buildings of BZS

== History ==
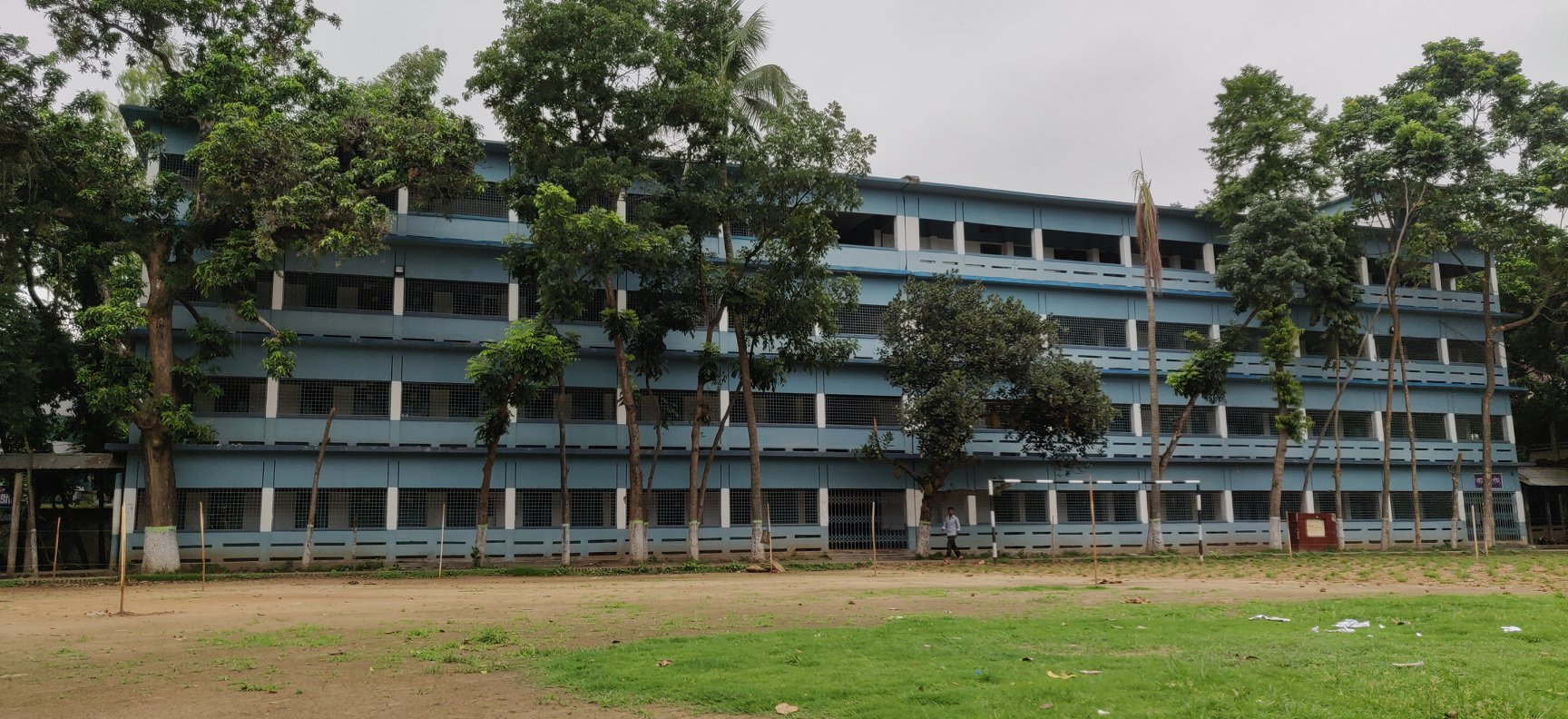
Academic Building 2

Bogra Zilla School was established in 1853. Babu Bhagabati Charan Ghosh was the first headmaster. It was a private (non-government) school before becoming a public one. It came under governmental management through the efforts of the magistrate and collector Mr. Russell and deputy collector Babu S. Mukharjee. The school observed its 150th anniversary celebration in 2005.

The school had four teachers during the period of Bhagabati Babu. According to the National School Committee, the school appears to have been founded principally by the sons and relatives of the clerks' officers connected with the Courts. After Bhagabati Babu, A. C. Mukharjee became Headmaster in 1859. During his tenure, two students passed in 2nd division, and one in 1st division with scholarship in 1862. Around this time, the tradition of giving books as rewards to the students of both Bangla and English schools based on their performance started.

== Notable alumni ==
- Gaziul Haque, language activist of Bengali language movement
- Humayun Ahmed - novelist and filmmaker
- Muhammad Zafar Iqbal - academic and writer
- Ziaur Rahman - former president of Bangladesh and the founder of Bangladesh Nationalist Party
- Akhteruzzaman Elias - novelist and short story writer
- Fazlul Bari - politician
- Loqman Husain - first Secretary of the Ministry of Posts, Telegraphs and Telephones of Bangladesh and inaugural Executive Director of the Asia-Pacific Telecommunity
- Mushfiqur Rahim - cricketer and former captain of Bangladesh national cricket team
- Tanzid Hasan, cricketer of Bangladesh national cricket team
- A. T. M. Hamidul Hossain Tariq- retired army officer and veteran of Bangladesh Liberation War.
- Pinaki Bhattacharya - activist and physician

== See also ==
- List of Zilla Schools of Bangladesh
