= Teletalk =

Bangladesh's state-owned mobile operator

Teletalk Bangladesh Ltd.
- Native name: টেলিটক
- Formerly: BGD bMobile (BTTB Mobile Telephone Project)
- Type: Public Limited Company
- Industry: Telecommunications
- Founded: 31 March 2005; 21 years ago
- Headquarters: Rajuk Commercial Complex, 3/A, 5/A, 7/A, Road 17, Gulshan-1, Dhaka, Bangladesh
- Area served: Bangladesh
- Key people: Dr. Md. Mushfiqur Rahman, Secretary, Posts and Telecommunications Division; Nurul Mabud Chowdhury (Acting MD/CEO)
- Products: Mobile Telephony, 2G, 3G, 4G, ESim
- Revenue: ▲5,245,445,837 ৳ (~ US$45 million) (2023-2024)
- Owner: Government of Bangladesh
- Website: www.teletalk.com.bd

Teletalk Bangladesh Ltd. DBA Teletalk (Bengali: টেলিটক) is a state-owned mobile phone operator in Bangladesh. It started operating in 2004. As of May 2026, Teletalk had a subscriber base of 6.81 million.

It also provides a wide range of Digital Services.

== History ==
Bangladesh Telephone & Telegraph Board - BTTB launched their subsidiary project of mobile network service named BTTB bMobile. Then it was rebranded to Teletalk Bangladesh Ltd. It was formed as the only public mobile operator in Bangladesh. Currently it is the fourth largest mobile phone operator in Bangladesh.

Old logo of Teletalk

Teletalk was incorporated on 26 December 2004 as a public limited company under the Companies Act, 1994 with an authorized capital of 2000 crore taka being the only government sponsored mobile telephone company in the country. On the same day the Company obtained Certificate of Commencement of Business. Teletalk launched its commercial operation on 26 December 2004.

It invested about 2 billion taka for spreading the GSM network countrywide. In 2012 it inaugurated the HSPA network. Then on 16 December 2018 LTE network was inaugurated.

Teletalk is a mobile network operator in Bangladesh and is wholly owned by the Government of Bangladesh.[1][2] The company uses the slogan “Amader Phone” (“Our Phone”).[1][2] In February 2024, Teletalk introduced eSIM services.[3][4]

=== Timeline ===
- 6 June 2012 - Launched new Pre-Paid Package named 'Progorsa'
- 15 June 2012 - Launched new Pre-Paid Package named 'Inforsgy'

== Network ==
As of Annual Report of Teletalk (2022-23), Teletalk total tower has already covered 78% of population. and also, it will add more BTS within 2023 to expand Mobile network coverage.

Teletalk's speciality is it has coverage in different hard to reach areas of the country like Sundarbans, Katka sea beach, Dublar Char, Char Nizam and different islands, haor area, hill tracts area etc.

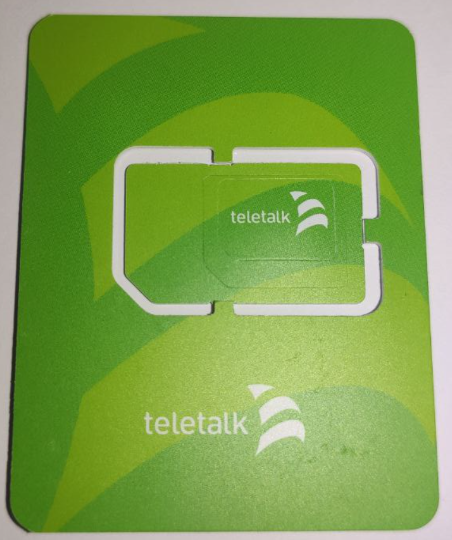
A Teletalk SIM Card

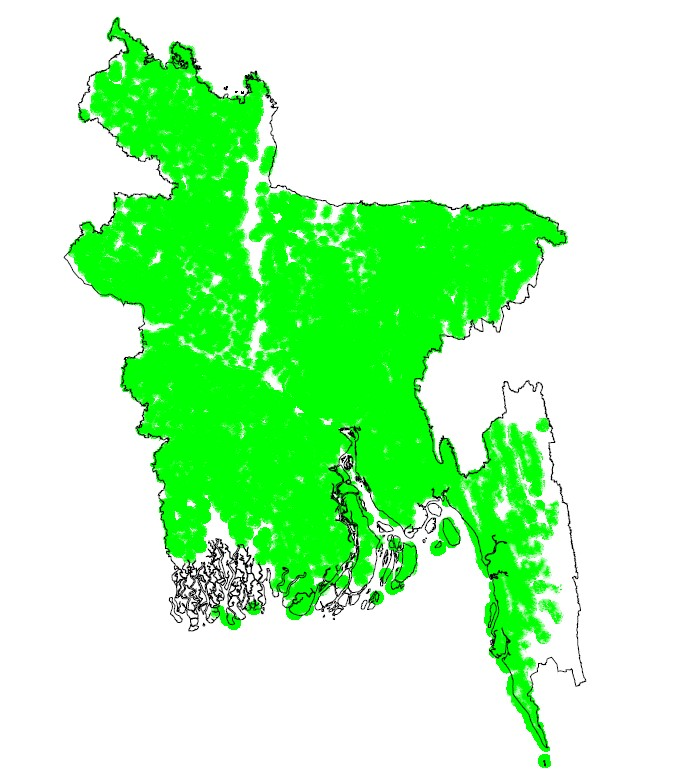
Teletalk Coverage Map - 3G

=== National Roaming Coverage ===
Under national roaming, Teletalk users can use Banglalink networks instead if their network is weak or have connection issues. This feature is now in trial mode. However, when selected it fails to connect as of 26 September 2024. Teletalk will use a total of 20,600 mobile network towers to serve customers under the National Roaming Network of Banglalink & Teletalk.

=== International roaming coverage ===
Teletalk has international roaming facilities.

== Technical information ==
Carrier name: Teletalk ("BGD bMobile", "Stay Home - Teletalk", and "bMobile" are shown on some devices. Older SIM cards with the 3G text show "Teletalk 3G" in place of the network name, regardless of which network the handset is connected to or which network the handset supports)
MCC+MNC: 470-04

2G: GSM (GPRS/EDGE) 900 MHz

3G: UMTS/HSPA 2100 MHz (in process of being decommissioned)

4G: 20 MHz total (10 MHz on Band 3 [1800 MHz] and 10 MHz on Band 1 [2100 MHz])

5G: 60Mhz (for trial run)

== Mobile services ==
Teletalk offers some mobile services like:

=== Voice services ===
Teletalk provides mobile voice services across Bangladesh under uniform regulatory tariffs. Following tax adjustments implemented in the FY 2024–25 national budget, mobile usage became subject to a combined indirect tax burden of approximately 39% (consisting of 15% Value Added Tax [VAT], 20% Supplementary Duty [SD], and a 1% surcharge).

In accordance with Bangladesh Telecommunication Regulatory Commission (BTRC) directives, the baseline voice tariffs are bound by a minimum floor rate of 45 paisa per minute and a maximum regulatory ceiling of 2.00 ৳ per minute. Teletalk structures its promotional and package-specific call rates (such as the 'Bornomala' or 'Oporajita' plans) between 45 paisa and 90 paisa per minute before taxes, utilizing charging intervals (pulses) of 1 second or 10 seconds depending on the specific tier.

Messaging services: Teletalk Provides SMS MMS & Bulk SMS services.

Internet services :Teletalk provides Mobile Internet Service.

== Digital services ==
MyTeletalk App provides solution for Teletalk services & offers

Teletalk AllJobs is a one stop solution for government and private jobs in Bangladesh.

Teletalk Mobile TV is the first mobile operator launched mobile tv And Broadcast ICC Cricket World Cup 2023

Teletalk offers Result Publication System for PSC, JSC, SSC, HSC, Hons(Degree) examination result.

Teletalk TBPS *727# provides Rural Electricity Bill payment easily.

== Numbering scheme ==
Teletalk uses the following numbering scheme for its subscribers:

For General Subscribers +880 15 N_{1}N_{2}N_{3}N_{4}N_{5}N_{6}N_{7}N_{8}

For Internet of Things (IoT) Subscribers +880 62 N_{1}N_{2}N_{3}N_{4}N_{5}N_{6}N_{7}N_{8}

Where, +880 is the ISD code for Bangladesh and is needed only in case of dialing from outside Bangladesh.

15 & 62 is the access code for Teletalk as allocated by the Government of Bangladesh. Omitting +880 will require using 0 in place of it instead to represent local calls, hence 015 is the general access code & 062 is the IoT Access Code.

N_{1}N_{2}N_{3}N_{4}N_{5}N_{6}N_{7}N_{8} is the subscriber number.

In 2018, when Mobile number portability was introduced, users can port to any operator without changing its number.
