= Nagad =

Mobile Financial Service in Bangladesh

- Type: Public
- Founded: March 26, 2019; 7 years ago
- Headquarters: Delta Dahlia Tower, 36, Kemal Ataturk Avenue, Banani, Dhaka 1213, Bangladesh
- Area served: Bangladesh
- Services: Mobile Banking, Mobile financial services
- Website: nagad.com.bd

Nagad (Bengali: নগদ) is a Bangladeshi Mobile Financial Service (MFS), operating under the authority of the Bangladesh Post Office, an attached department of the Ministry of Post and Telecommunication.

It is the new version of the previously introduced Postal Cash Card and Electronic Money Transfer System (EMTS) of the Bangladesh Post Office. Its headquarters is located at 36 Kemal Ataturk Avenue, Banani, Dhaka — 1213, Bangladesh. Nagad is the first digital bank in the country.

== Operations ==
This financial service is regulated under the Bangladesh Postal Act Amendment 2010 Section 3(2), a unique law procured especially for the Bangladesh Post Office by the government of Bangladesh. The digital financial service was launched by the Bangladesh Post Office on 11 November 2018. It started operations on 26 March 2019, celebrating the 48th Independence Day of the country.

Nagad initially launched with core mobile financial services including cash-in, cash-out, money transfers, and mobile recharge. Additional services, such as bill payments and an e-commerce payment gateway, were subsequently introduced. The platform operates through a dedicated mobile application available to both customers and partners. Nagad also developed a digital customer onboarding system known as DKYC (Digital KYC), which integrates Bangla OCR and automated identity verification to streamline the account registration process and reduce reliance on paper-based procedures.

== Awards ==
- Most Emerging Brand of Bangladesh (2023)
- Mastercard Excellence Award (2023)
- Best Innovative DFS-2021 (2022)
