= Dhanmondi Government Boys' High School =

- ধানমণ্ডি গভঃ বয়েজ হাই স্কুল

Location
- 3, Sobhanbagh, Mirpur Road; Dhaka; Bangladesh

Information
- Type: Public boys' school
- Motto: ঈমান, শৃঙ্খলা, শিক্ষা, চরিত্র, উন্নতি (Faith, Discipline, Education, Character, Prosperity)
- Established: 1965
- Founder: Syed Jafor Abbas Rizvi
- Headmaster: Farida Yesmin
- Teaching staff: 75
- Grades: 1–10
- Gender: Male
- Age range: 6–18
- Enrollment: More than 2500 (as 2019)
- Language: Bengali
- Campus: Urban
- Campus size: 26 Acres
- Colors: White and Navy blue
- Athletics: DGBHS
- Sports: Football cricket basketball volleyball table tennis hockey badminton
- Accreditation: Board of Intermediate and Secondary Education, Dhaka
- Yearbook: Ankur
- Alumni: DExSA
- Website: www.dgbhs.edu.bd

Dhanmondi Government Boys' High School (DGBHS) is a public boys' school located in Mirpur Road, Dhaka, Bangladesh, near Farmgate. It is a state run educational institution located at the intersection of Mirpur Road and Manik Miah Avenue. Originally started as the model government school to educate the children of higher government officials, member of parliaments, and prominent businessman of the capital, the school is now open to every student despite their background. DGBHS has a diverse group of successful and well-known alumni network in Bangladesh and all over the world. DGBHS also played a very vital role in help sheltering the Mukti Bahini during the Liberation War, resulting the total demolition of the school campus by an air strike by the Pakistan Air Force. Continuing the legacy, DGBHS students were one of the core organisers of the 2018 Bangladesh road-safety protests.

== Daily assembly ==
Assembly is called every day before schooling. Students recite Surah and pay respect to every religion. Finally, the students sing the national anthem of Bangladesh.

== Uniform ==
From classes 1 to 3, the school uniform is a white shirt with navy blue shorts, white shoes, and a navy blue sweater (for winter only). From classes 4 to 10, the uniform is a white shirt with full-length navy blue pants, white shoes, and a navy blue sweater (for winter only). Two pieces of printed school badges are usually provided by the school authority.

== Exam system and results ==
There are two terms in a year. The first is the "half-yearly" term (January – June), and the second is the "annual" term (July – December). Two class tests are taken before both half yearly and annual examination. Students get their results digitally printed. The final result is announced taking 40% numbers from 'Half-yearly' term and 40% number from 'Annual' Term and 20% number from class test examinations. For classes 8, and 10, students sit for a "test exam" instead of an "annual exam."

== Teachers-guardians conference ==
Teacher-guardian conferences are called periodically.

== Library ==
The books in the library were largely bought by coeval sanctioned money during the establishment of the school. Others were bought by annually approved money. For the reason of Enam Committee the post 'librarian' was discontinued but now it is running under a teacher of this school.

== School magazine ==
The name of the school magazine is ANKUR. The magazine is sourced by current students writing every year.

== Students' association ==
The former students of DGBHS are known as DExSAn (sometimes referred to Dboys), a phrase initially proposed by Dboys' Ex-Students Association (DExSA) just before its wider acceptance. DExSA, however, is the alumni association of the institution.

== Extracurricular sports ==
The annual sports competition is organised by the school authority in February each year and it includes sprints (100 to 400 meters), long jump, and high jump etc.

== Clubs and Societies ==
- Dhanmondi Govt. Boys' High School Scouts Group
- Dhanmondi Govt Boys' Debating Society
- DGBHS Bangladesh National Cadet Core
- DGBHS Youth Red Crescent Society
- DGBHS Film and Photography Club
- Science Club of DGBHS
- Quizzing Society Of D. Boyzists
- Dhanmondi Govt. Boys' Language and Reading Club
- Dhanmondi Govt. Boys' High School Sports and Games Club

== SSC results ==
Year	Total Examinees	Pass	Percentage	GPA-5
2003	259	257	97.29%	52
2005	268	265	99.25%	123
2006	260	260	100%	123
2007	265	265	100%	149
2008	289	289	100%	213
2009	292	290	98.28%	167
2010	283	283	99.65%	200
2011	322	322	100%	218
2012	299	299	100%	208
2013	299	297	99.35%	109
2014	317	317	100%	217
2015	316	314	99.37%	107
2016	318	317	99.69%	214
2017	294	288	97.96%	169
2018	302	300	99.34%	113
2019	324	311	95.99%	123
2020	335	330	98.51%	138
2021	293	293	100%	129
2022	333	330	99.1%	196
2023	313	307	98.08%	159

== Notable alumni ==
- Saber Hossain Chowdhury
- M. Zahid Hasan
- Tushar Imran
- Syed Hasanur Rahman
- Abdus Suttar Khan
- Sharifullah
- Shatabdi Wadud
- Ferdous Wahid
- Muhammad Nawshad Zamir
- Amanullah Aman
- Mujibur Rahman Chowdhury
- Sheikh Fazle Noor Taposh
- Afran Nisho
- Chowdhury Jawata Afnan
- Akbar Ali Khan
- Mahdi Amin
- Mobasser Monem
- Shish Haider Chowdhury
- Mir Mushfiqur Rahman
