= Bangladesh Post Office =

Postal service provider in Bangladesh

Bangladesh Post
- Native name: Bengali: বাংলাদেশ ডাক বিভাগ
- Company type: State-owned postal authority
- Industry: Postal Service, Courier
- Predecessor: Pakistan Post
- Founded: 20 December 1971; 54 years ago
- Headquarters: Dhaka, Bangladesh
- Number of locations: GPOs - 8, Sub Offices - 487, Extra-Departmental Post Office - 9,400
- Area served: World Wide
- Key people: SM Shahab Uddin; (Director General)
- Products: Courier express services Freight forwarding services Logistics services
- Revenue: ৳139.9 million (2024)
- Net income: ৳280 million (2024)
- Owner: Government of Bangladesh
- Number of employees: 40,000 approx.
- Parent: Posts and Telecommunications Division
- Website: www.bangladeshpost.gov.bd

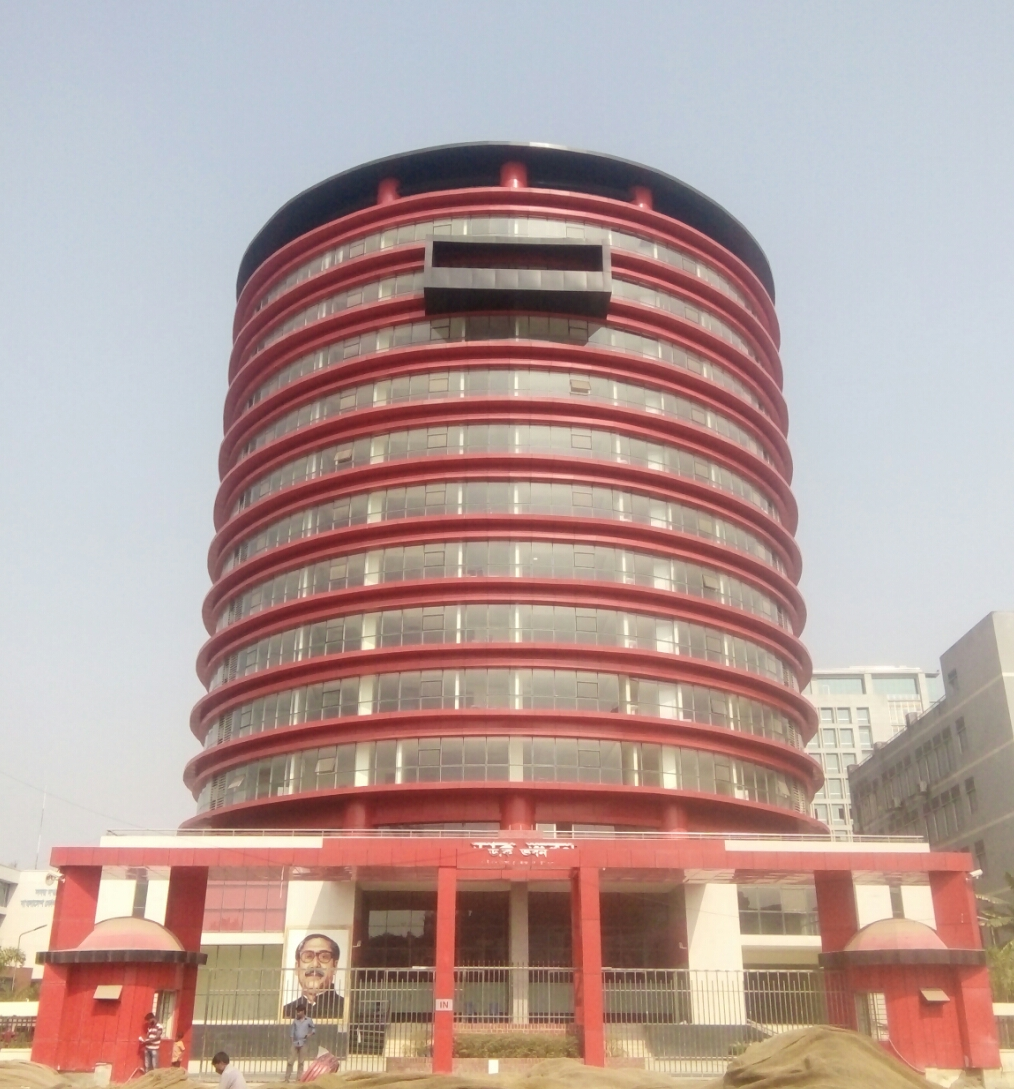
Headquarters of Bangladesh Post Office

The Bangladesh Post Office (Bengali: বাংলাদেশ ডাক বিভাগ) also known by trade name Bangladesh Post is a government-operated agency responsible for providing postal services in Bangladesh. It is a subsidiary of the Ministry of Posts, Telecommunications and Information Technology. This ministry is concerned with the policymaking for its two attached departments.

== History ==
The first recorded postal system in Bengal was established under Qutb ud-Din Aibak, founder of the Delhi Sultanate, in the 13th century. He established a system of horse messenger from Delhi to Bengal similar to the systems that existed in Arabia. By 1296, Sultan Alauddin Khalji established a postal department called the Mahakama-i-Barid which was led by an officer titled Malik Barid-i-Mamalik. He introduced runners, writers called Munshis in every town in Bengal, and reformed the existing postal system.

The postal system in Bengal was further developed by Sultan Muhammad bin Tughluq as seen by Arabian travel writer Ibn Battuta. Postal officers also engaged in some law enforcement functions. Further improvements were made under Sher Shah Suri, founder of the Suri Empire, who repaired the Grand Trunk Road and established 17 hundred postal houses with 3400 runners. Mughal Emperor Jahangir introduced pigeons to carry messages in the empire including Bengal.

The system was managed by a three tier officer service with Mir Munshi on top, then Darogah-i-Dak Chowki, and the third level were Diwan-i-insha. The runners in the postal system came from the low caste mewras. The lowest ranked personnel were called harkara who aside from carrying messages also informed the local governor of important developments and news in his area. During Mughal rule the postal system carried different types of letters and orders of various importance. The Firmans were orders of the Mughal Emperor, Shuqque were letters by the emperor, Nishan were letters from members of the royal family, Hasb-ul-hukum were orders from the ministers of the Mughal Emperor, Sanad were appointment letters in the empire, Parwanah were official orders, and Dastak were official permits.

After the East India Company took over Bengal from the Mughal Empire they maintained a similar postal service. The company developed lines of communication through the postal network connecting important commercial cities in Bengal with each other such as Calcutta, Chittagong, Dhaka, Dinajpur, Murshidabad, Rajshahi, Rangpur, and Rajmahal. The system was called Clive's post after East India Company official Robert Clive. Warren Hastings established a General Post Office in Kolkata on 17 March 1774. The rate for mail was two anna for every 160 kilometres (99 mi) the letter was carried.

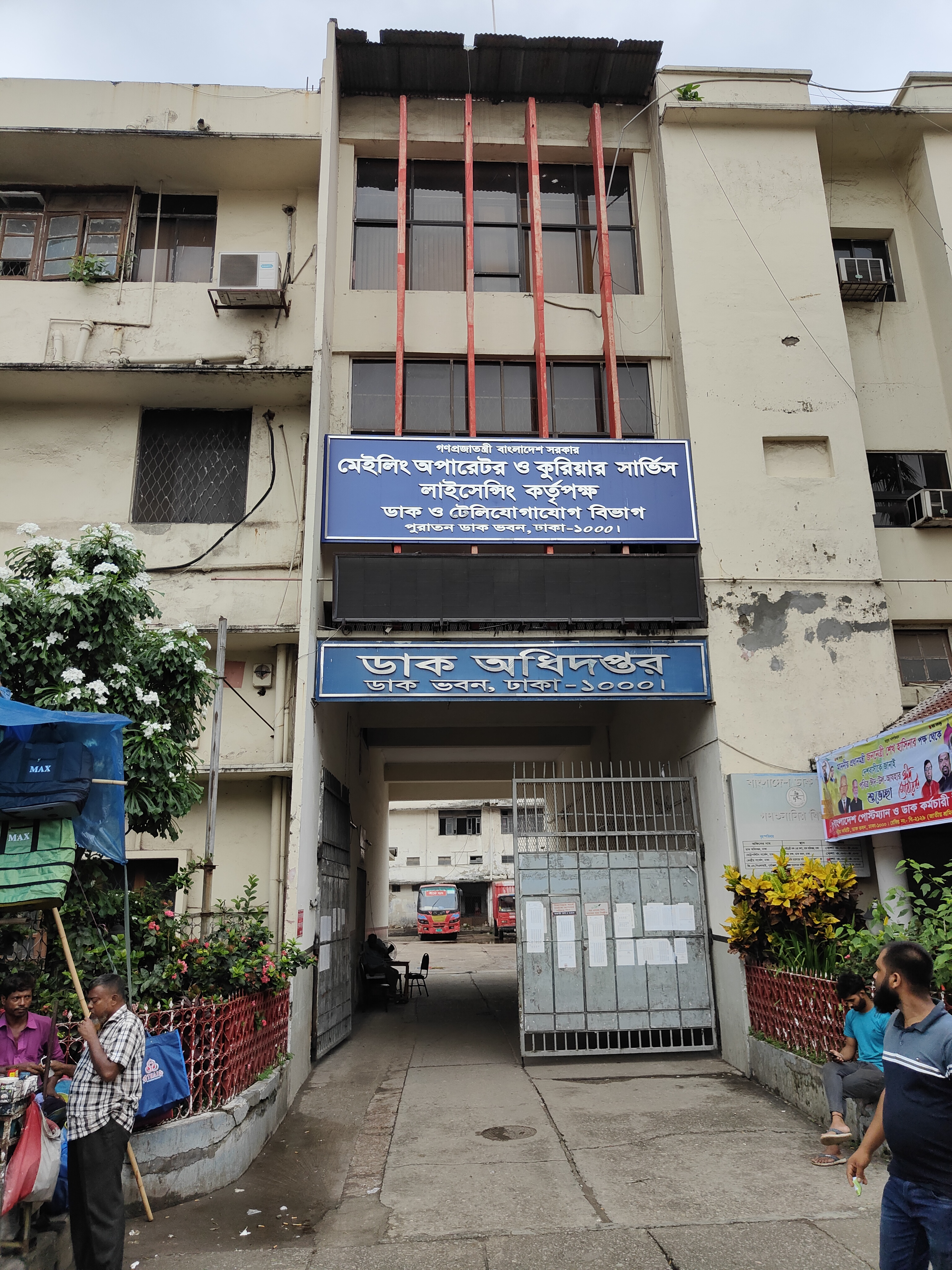
Old post office headquarter in GPO road, Gulisthan, Dhaka

The palanquin postal service, introduced in 1784, carried passengers along with letters. The service was stopped from June to September due to the monsoon. In 1791, the postal rates were increased and the Permanent Settlement of Bengal passed in 1793 which placed the local dak under the responsibility of the local Zamindar. The business community in Bengal operated a private postal service system called the mahajani dak. In 1798, Richard Wellesley, 1st Marquess Wellesley, passed a bill to reform the postal service. The General Post Office in Kolkata had nine branches in Eastern Bengal in 1798.

On 1 October 1854, the first postage stamps was introduced in Bengal and India worth one anna and half anna. In 1854, the postal service started the use of trains and in 1864 the Railway Mail Service started operations. In 1875, travelling post offices were introduced. From 1856 to 1857, letter boxes were introduced. In September 1978, the East Bengal postal service was introduced in Dhaka. On 1 February 1880, the regular railway mail service was introduced in Bengal. From 1864 to 1865, the profit of the postal service doubled. Embossed envelopes and an Assam postal circle were introduced on 1 July 1873, registered post were introduced on 1 August 1877, post cards were introduced on 1 July 1879, and insured posts were introduced on 1 January 1878.

The Postal Service on 1 January 1880 introduced money order services. Assam Steamer Service was established in 1884 and abolished in 1904. Barisal, Chittagong, Dhaka, Khulna, Narayanganj, and Fenchuganj received their own steamer railway services. On 1 December 1883, telegraph services were introduced with the offices based out of the post offices. Post Office Act was passed in 1898. In 1909, Express telegram service were introduced in Bengal. In 1905, Bengal was partitioned along with the postal service. The headquarters of postal service in Eastern Bengal and Assam was based in Dhaka and founded in 1907. The start of World War One established field post offices.

The Dhaka to Kolkata air mail route was opened on 1 December 1933. The start of World War Two saw the establishment of censor departments in the post office. In May 1942, the post office opened a field office in Jessore. On 14 August 1947, India was partitioned and East Bengal and Sylhet from Assam joined Pakistan. The Bengal and Assam Circle were divided and were used to create East Bengal postal circle in Pakistan. The postal service in East Bengal had a shortage of equipment and staff after the partition and was using overprinted British India stamps. On 9 July 1948, Pakistan stamps were introduced. The government started to modernize the services in East Bengal in the 1950s. Dhaka to Karachi postal flights were established to carry letters between East Pakistan and West Pakistan. General Post Offices were opened in Chittagong, Dhaka, and Khulna. Since 1956, stamps also were written in Bengali language after it was made one of the state languages of the country.

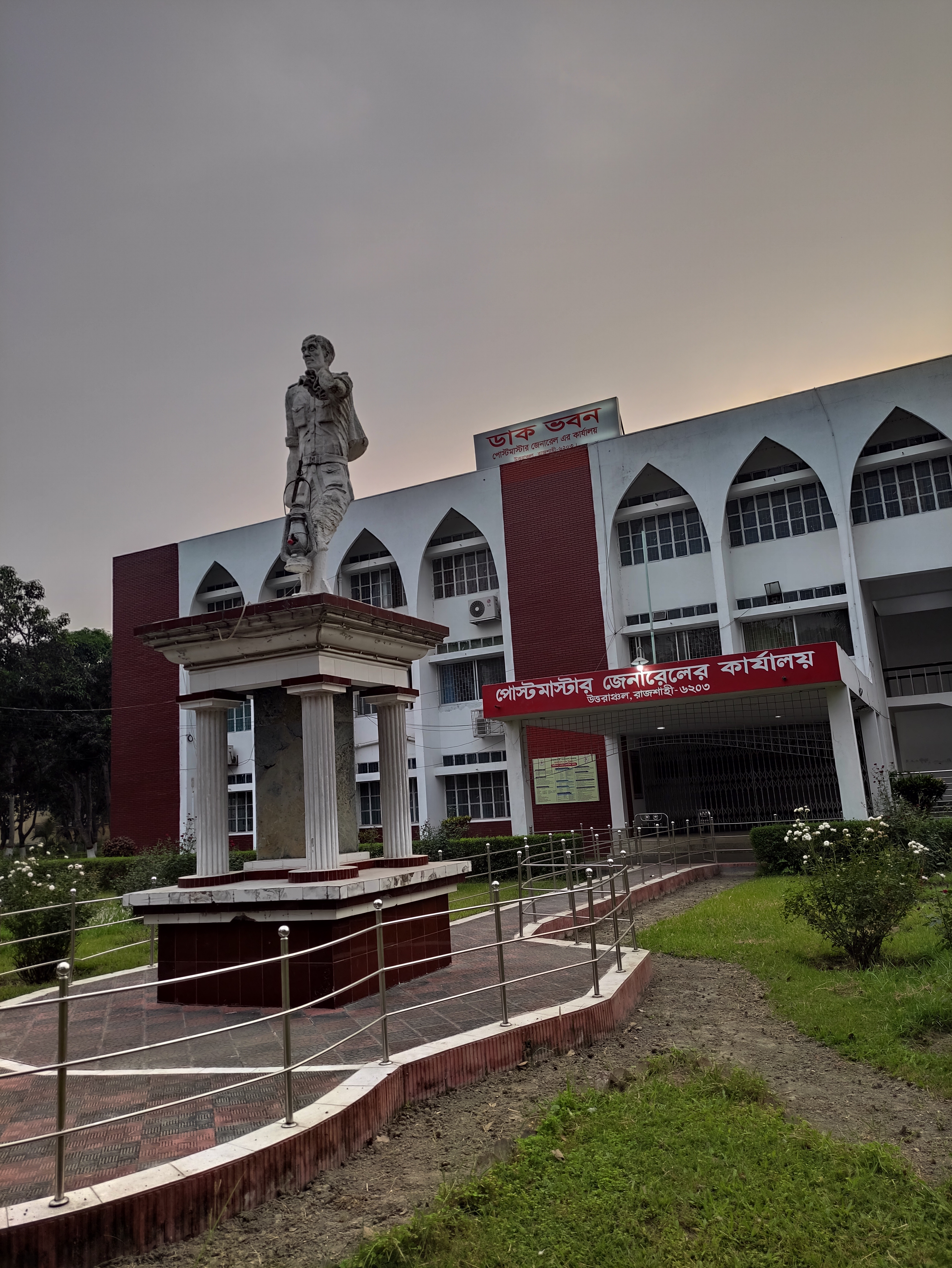
Rajshahi Postal Academy premises and the 'Runner' statue

In 1971, during the Bangladesh Liberation War, the Provisional Government of Bangladesh, established a postal service with 50 field offices located near the border with India in areas under full or partial control of the Mukti Bahini. Barrister Moudud Ahmed, future Prime Minister of Bangladesh, was the first post master general of Bangladesh. Biman Mullick designed the first eight stamps of Bangladesh during the war including one with a photo of Sheikh Mujibur Rahman. The government of Pakistan outlawed the eight stamps. The provisional government also used overprinted stamps stolen by an officer from the general post office in Dhaka. A.M. Ahsanullah was the first director general of the post office. The field offices were merged with the existing postal service after the Independence of Bangladesh. During the war, 120 offices of the post office were destroyed and more than 200 officials were killed. Bangladesh Post Office started with 6667 offices and nearly 25 thousand personnel. Local post offices were ordered to rubber stamp Bangladesh on existing inventory of Pakistan stamps. On 19 February 1984, the Guaranteed Express Post was started. On 30 January 1985 a post museum was established in Dhaka. On 22 December 1986, postal codes were introduced in Bangladesh and in the same year a postal academy was established in Rajshahi.

Bangladesh Government Press prints forms and files for Bangladesh Post Department. On 8 July 2015, ABM Humayun was appointed director general of Bangladesh Post Office. According to The Daily Star in 2017, various post offices in Bangladesh were in dilapidated conditions with limited equipment and poor operating conditions. This was due to falling usage of the postal services especially declining number of personnel letters due to alternate modes of communication such as the internet. There were 9886 post offices and around 40,000 employees in 2017. Letters sent by the post office declined from 410 million in 1982–1983 to only 50 million in 2015-2016 fiscal year.

In September 2022, parliamentary standing committee on Posts and Telecommunications recommended the removal of Sudhangshu Shekhar Bhadra, director general of Bangladesh Post Office, over irregularities.

== Services ==
The main services of the Bangladesh post office are to mail letters, Postal Life Insurance (PLI), post cards, parcels, newspapers and periodicals, books, or packets. The general delivery time is 2–3 days depending upon the distance and communication of destination.

Electronic Money Transfer Service (EMTS) is one of the service which started operations 26 March 2010. This service was commercially launched in a limited scope (in 104 post offices) on 10 May 2010. However, in response of overwhelming demand, this service has now been expanded in 2750 post offices throughout the country including all district Head Post Offices, upazila and important/busy rural post offices. This service has got wide acceptability and popularity within a short period of time, which can be regarded as a significant achievement of the present government.

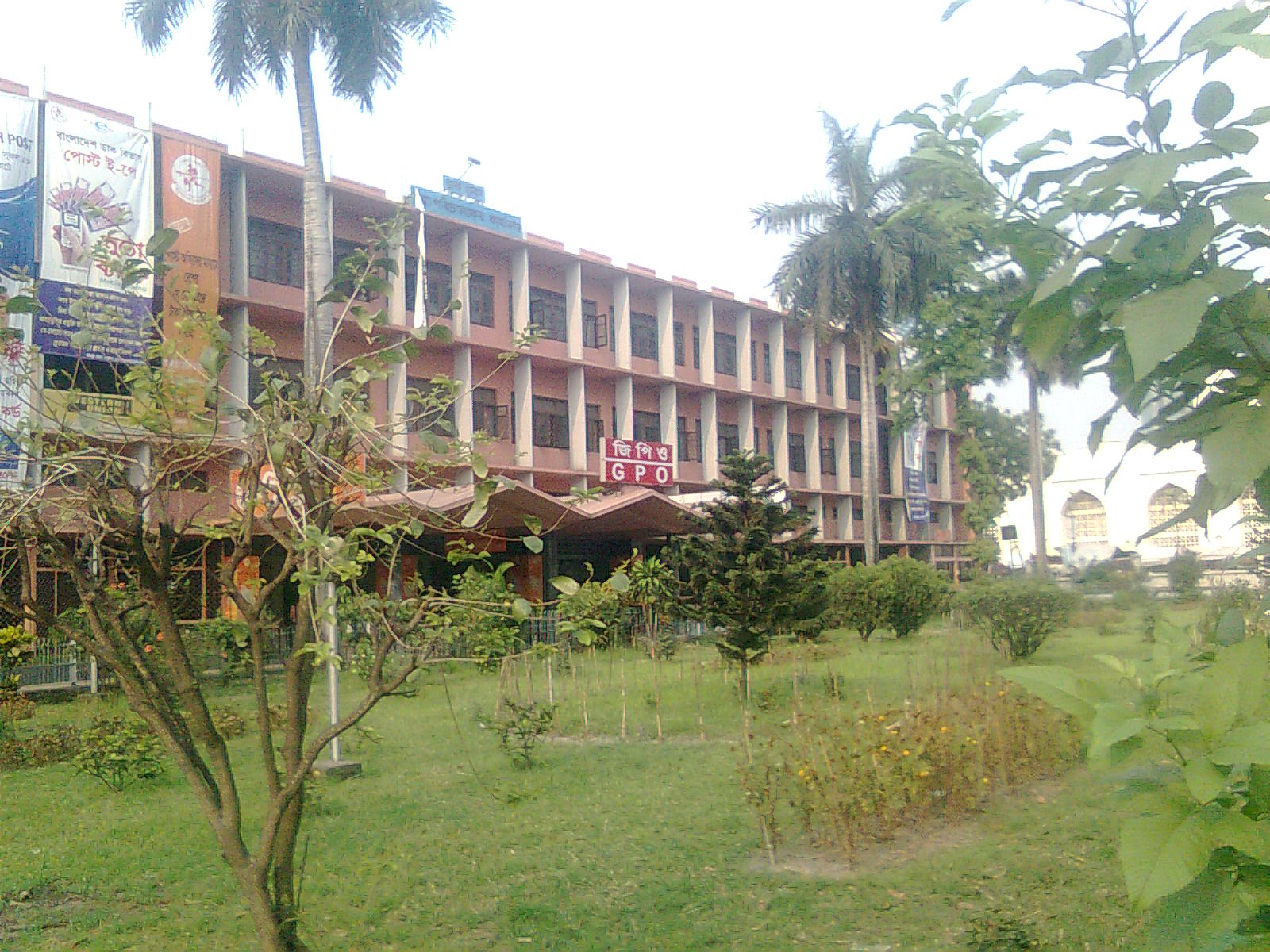
General Post Office in Dhaka

Postal Cash Card is a debit card. Start operation at 26 March 2010. Now available at all district, upazila and important/selected post offices. Purchase a postal cash card will cost BDT 45.00 which includes minimum balance of BDT 10.00. No yearly charge or profit/interest against customer balance. Service: Cash in, Cash out, Balance transfer to other card, Transaction with POS & ATM located at post offices or QCASH marked POS/ATM booths.

=== Nagad ===
This financial service is regulated under the Bangladesh Postal Act Amendment 2010 Section 3(2), a unique law procured especially for the Bangladesh Post Office by the Government of Bangladesh. The digital financial service was launched by the Bangladesh Post Office on 11 November 2018. It started operations on 26 March 2019, celebrating the 48th Independence Day of the country.

Nagad started its journey with demanding services like Cash-In, Cash-Out, Send Money, Mobile Recharge. More popular services like Bills Payment and E-commerce Payment gateway are now available. From the very beginning, Nagad has its own Mobile App for Customers and Partners. It also introduced a revolutionary Customer on-boarding feature- DKYC (Digital KYC) blending Bangla OCR, automated Identity verification and localized data that has minimized overall customer acquisition & life cycle time to one/tenth of market practice as well focusing on Paper-less environment.

=== Dak Taka ===
Dak Taka is a mobile banking service announced by the post office in December 2017. According to the post office, it will bring financial services to unbanked villagers through its more than 8,000 offices. Its stated goal was to be operational within three months and bring 30 million of the unbanked into the system within a year.

A customer can open an account by depositing a minimum of two taka. They can make deposits and withdrawals at a post office or with postal cash cards. Dak Taka makes their phone into a digital wallet. They can make bill payments and transactions with other financial institutions using an app. While shopping, they can make payments with their phone using NFC (near-field communication) or by scanning a QR code.

== E-Post ==
Electronic Mail Service was introduced as "E-Post" from 16 Aug 2000. The ePost service enabled people to send and receive messages or scanned images through e-mail from selected Post offices in the country. This service is now available in 16 Head Post offices, namely Dhaka GPO, Chittagong GPO, Sylhet HPO, Moulavibazar HPO, Feni HPO and Comilla HPO. Noakhali HPO, Mymensingh HPO, Jessore HPO, Kushtia HPO, Barisal HPO, Bogra HPO, Sirajganj HPO From 2015 the Post department started its e-commerce services.

== Gallery ==
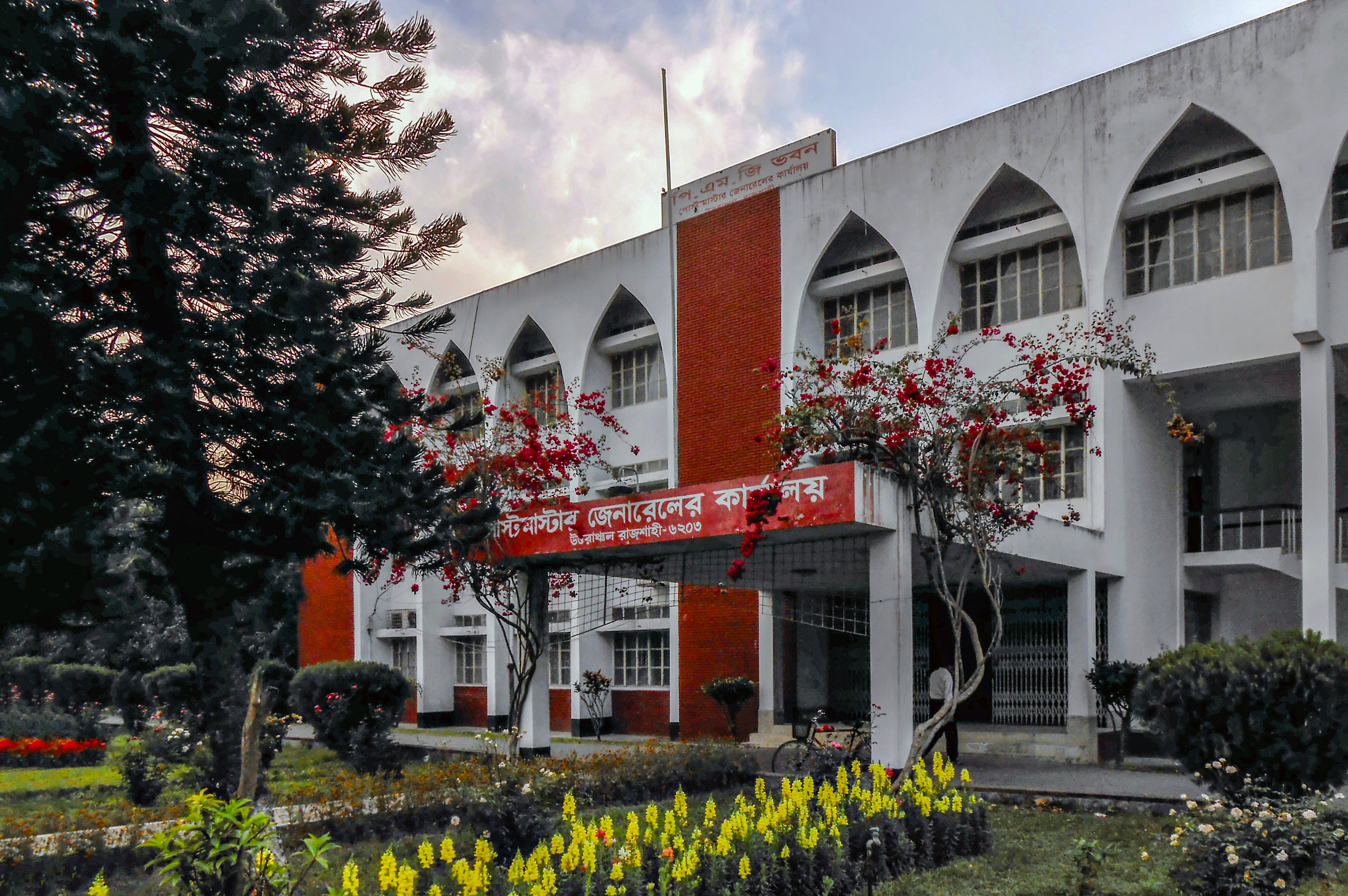
Office of the Postmaster General in Postal Academy, Rajshahi

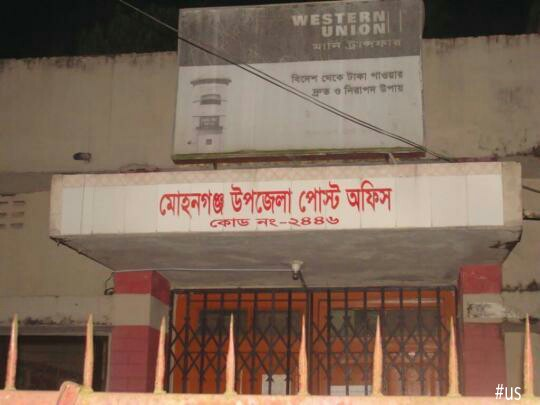
Mohanganj Upazila Post Office

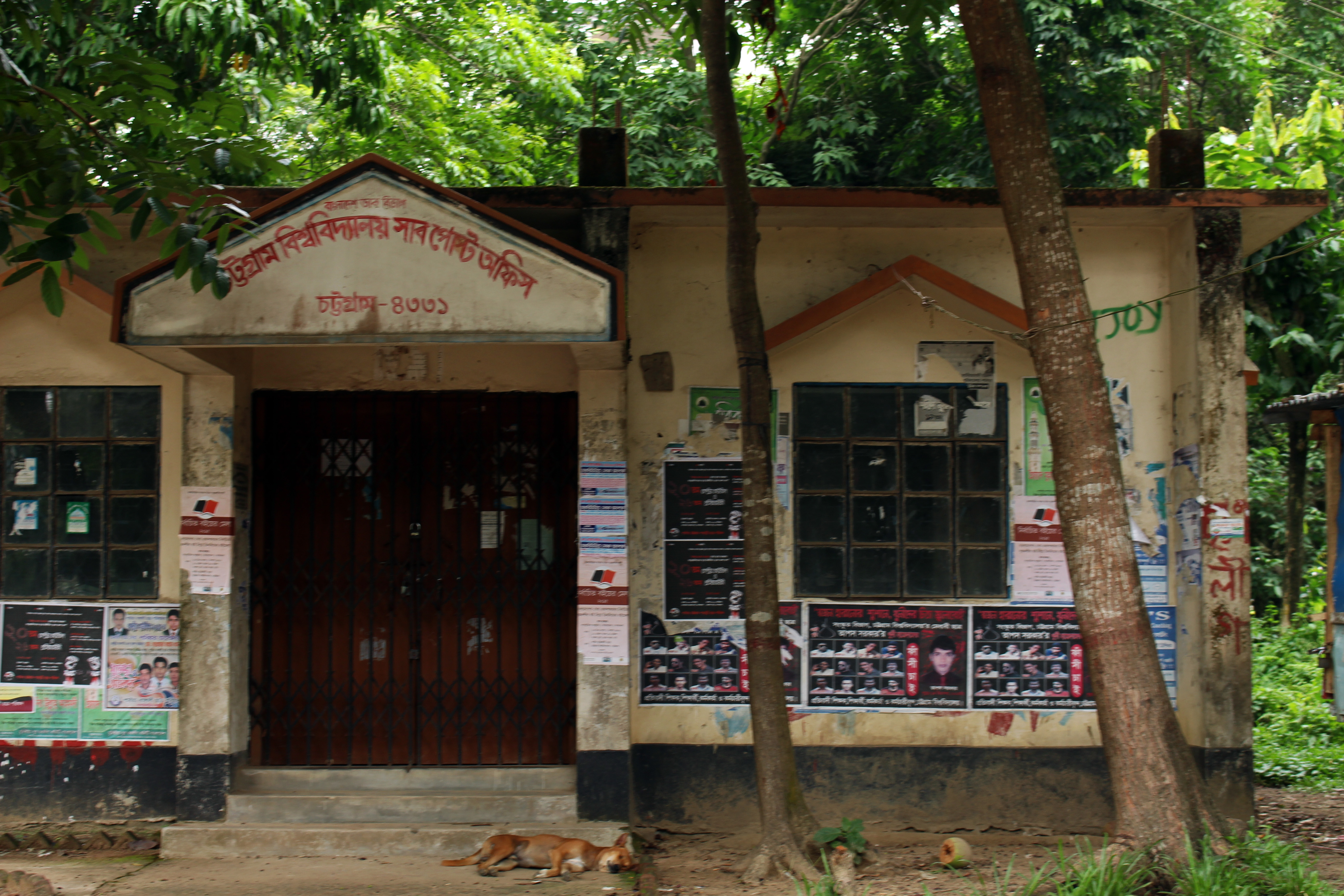
Chittagong University Sub Post Office

== See also ==
- Nagad
- List of postal codes in Bangladesh
