= Mohammad Salah Uddin =

Bangladeshi civil servant

Mohammad Salah Uddin is a Bangladeshi civil servant and former Secretary of the Prime Minister's Office under Prime Minister Sheikh Hasina. He was an independent director of British American Tobacco. He was a director of Saudi-Bangladesh Industrial and Agricultural Investment Company Limited. He was a director of Bangladesh Infrastructure Finance Fund Limited.

He was a director of Infrastructure Development Company and Grameen Bank. He is the former private secretary-1 to Prime Minister Sheikh Hasina. He is the former deputy commissioner of Dhaka District. He is the former deputy commissioner of Panchagarh District.

== Early life ==
Uddin did his master's degree in philosophy from the University of Dhaka.

== Career ==
Uddin joined the Bangladesh Civil Service on 25 April 1994. He was the Assistant Commissioner (Land) of Gazipur District and Tangail District. He served as the Upazila Nirbahi Officer in Gaibandha District and Natore District. He was appointed the deputy commissioner of Panchagarh District from deputy secretary of Ministry of Industries in April 2013. He met with tea garden owners and factory owners to settle a price dispute on green tea leaves. He was present at the opening of the immigration center at Tetulia in February 2016. He was transferred to Dhaka in 2016.

Uddin was the deputy commissioner of Dhaka District. As deputy commissioner, he moderated a hearing of the Anti-Corruption Commission on Bangladesh Road Transport Authority in May 2016. Bangladesh Nationalist Party politicians submitted a memorandum to him demanding the government release former Prime Minister Khaleda Zia in February 2018.

Uddin was the personal secretary-1 to Prime Minister Sheikh Hasina from January 2020. He is the former director general of the Prime Minister's Office.

Uddin was appointed secretary to the Prime Minister's Office on 8 December 2022.He is a director of Biman since 2023. He is an independent director of British American Tobacco since 25 January 2023. He is a director of Saudi-Bangladesh Industrial and Agricultural Investment Company Limited. He is a director of Bangladesh Infrastructure Finance Fund Limited. He is a director of Infrastructure Development Company. He is a director of Grameen Bank. He is a director of Hotels International Limited. After the fall of the Sheikh Hasina led Awami League government he was made an officer on special duty.
