= Raas Dance =

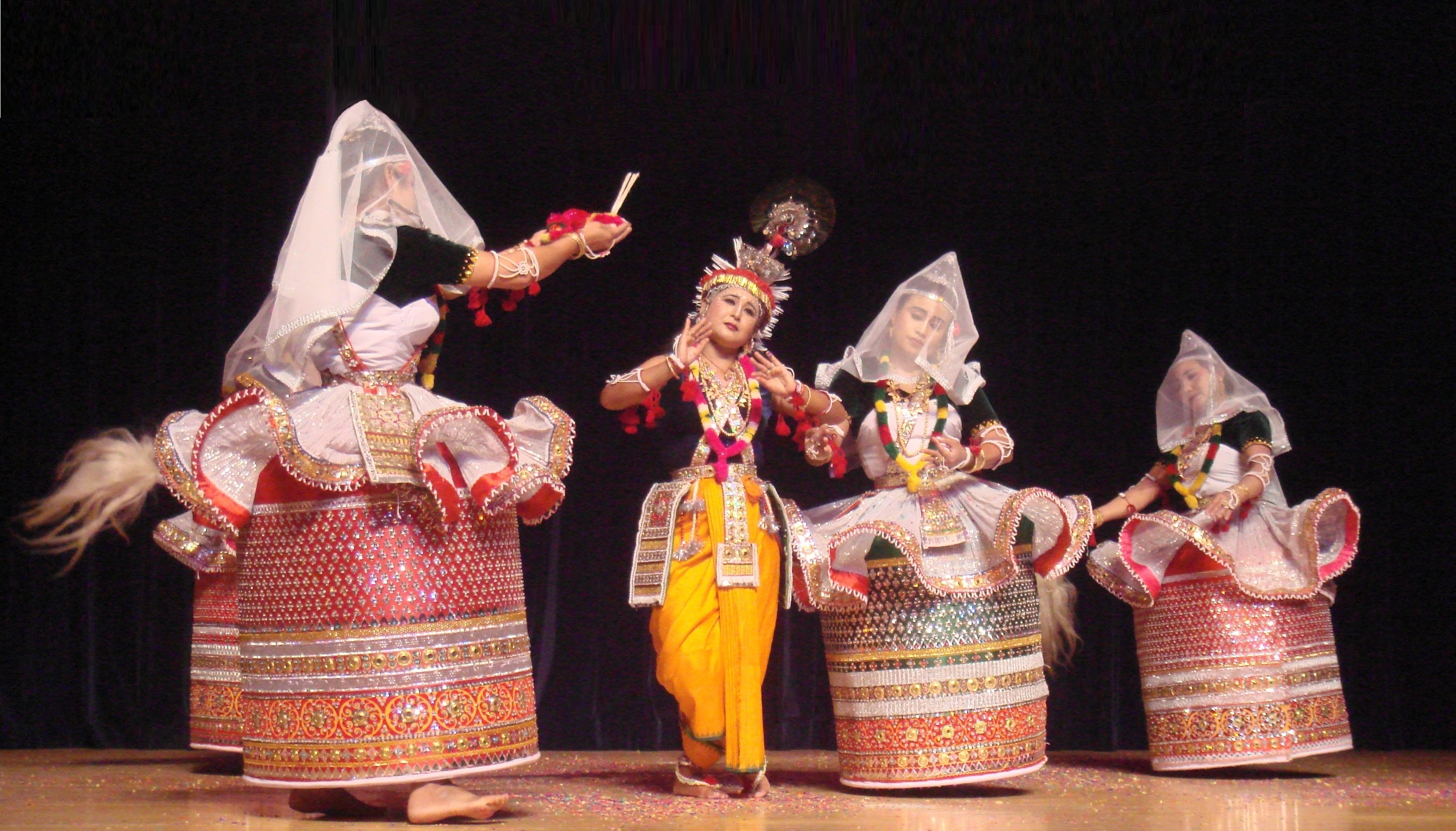
Manipuri dance style depiction of Raas Leela

The dance performed during the Raas mela festival is known as Raas Dance. The Raas Purnima festival is the most significant religious and cultural heritage celebration for the Manipuri indigenous community in Bangladesh. This festival is held annually on the full moon of Kartik (October-November). In celebration of the Raas festival, the Raas Dance is performed. This dance is an exquisite classical creation of Manipuri cultural heritage, portraying the visible form of invisible emotions.

== Background ==
The Raas Dance is divided into five categories: "Maha Raas," "Basanta Raas," "Kunja Raas," "Divya Raas," and "Nitya Raas." Among these, "Maha Raas" is the most grand and elaborate. As described in the fifth chapter of the Bhagavata Purana, the Maha Raas is performed in stages such as Krishna’s rendezvous with Radha, group gatherings, emotional exchanges of the gopis, Krishna’s dance, Radha’s dance, the gopis’ dances, Krishna’s disappearance, reappearance, floral tributes, and concluding with the return to their homes. In Raas Dance, the roles of Radha and Krishna are usually played by children under five years old. The Manipuri community believes that after this age, children lose their divine aura. However, the primary dramatic performances and songs are presented by young women portraying Radha’s companions. The central focus of Raas Dance is the "Bhangi Pareng," or the dance sequence. The Raas Leela begins with Nata Sankirtan, performed by the artists in front of the deity’s idol in the grand temple pavilion of Govindaji. Accompanied by mridanga and cymbals, the artists perform Sankirtan, adorned in special attire. The event, lasting nearly five hours, begins with the invocation of Sri Krishna Chaitanya and continues with Raas songs. Through this dance, the devotional artists emotionally connect with Sri Krishna. The songs for the Raas Dance are drawn from the poetry of Bengali, Maithili, Brajabuli, and Meitei poets.

== Recognition ==
Manipuri dance was introduced to the outside world by the poet Rabindranath Tagore. During his visit to Sylhet in 1926, he was mesmerized by the delicate movements of this dance. Later, he incorporated its elements into his dance dramas. The Manipuri community continues to celebrate Nata Sankirtan and Raas annually with devotion and festivity.

== See also ==
- Dublar Char
