= African Telecommunications Union =

African intergovernmental organization

The African Telecommunications Union (ATU) is an organization in Africa that combines countries and mobile telecommunications providers in an attempt to dramatically increase development of the continent's information and communication technology (ICT) infrastructure.

== History ==
The foundation of the ATU dates back to 1977 when its mission was a part of the Organization of African Unity (OAU), which has since been replaced by the African Union (AU). The ATU was officially formed in 1999 as the successor to the Pan-African Telecommunications Union (PATU) and is headquartered in Kinshasa, Democratic Republic of Congo, but due to war, the ATU has relocated to Nairobi, Kenya. At this time, the organization slightly transformed from primarily a coordinating body for government related activity to include private and public stakeholders in the information and telecommunications technology sector. The ATU now enforces a constitution and has added a secretary general along with a technical management team to ensure a more effective transformation from the PATU. Currently, the ATU attempts to provide a collaborative atmosphere for public and private stakeholders to formulate and negotiate policies that might increase the role of Africa in the booming environment of ICT. So, while the PATU previously only allowed public membership of government's, the ATU now allows organizations from the private sector to become associate members.

== Mission of the ATU ==
Like many telecommunications unions, the ATU advocates for increased information development within their region of interest, the continent of Africa. The ATU aims to ensure transparency and accountability, effective funding and financing, and quality service to all with whom it collaborates. In addition to goals for inclusion within the information society and specifically among African nations, the ATU promotes positive collaboration with the Institute for Computer Technology research and development. As the Internet has recently become the preeminent communication technology for fostering economic growth, this area is of great focus for the ATU. Because the Internet reaches 0.1 percent of Africa's population, the ATU attempts to address the connectivity gap among the nations in Africa and strives for universal access throughout Africa. In achieving this goal, the ATU hopes to be a meaningful player in the development and progression of Africa as a significant contributor to the global information and knowledge society.

=== Major Reforms/Initiatives ===
Because the ATU's formal establishment is rather young, there have not been many major reforms. The ATU is in the process of collaborating with regional economic associations and attempting to bolster confidence in a united African effort for the advancement of ICT. Recently the ATU signed a “cooperation agreement” with the Intergovernmental Authority on Development, the Regional African Satellite Communications Organization and other regional economic organizations. Historically, leaders of various African nations have been protective of resources, power, and sovereignty resulting in limited progress for the continent. However, the ATU works actively to encourage cooperation for ICT development.

=== Obstacles to ATU Mission ===
Many problems face the African continent in the area of ICT development. The cost of computers and information services are very high. Much of this is caused by the lack of infrastructure in place to manufacture advanced technologies and the limited development of ICT networks. Moreover, the networks in Africa, including both telephone and Internet infrastructure, are owned by American and European providers. Additionally, many of the brightest researchers and scientists in Africa are leaving the continent to pursue intellectual and trade development in other countries of the world, because the opportunities for professional development in Africa are limited. As a result, research and development within Africa lacks significantly, and education of the region's population continues to slow.

== Organisational structure ==
The ATU is divided into five principal parts: the Conference of Plenipotentiaries (CPL), the Administrative Council, the Technical and Development Conference, the General Secretariat, and Non-Permanent Units. The CPL occurs on a four-year cycle, which is attended by the Ministers of Communications, and has the authority to adapt the constitution and is the major policy platform. The CPL also elects the secretary general and members of the Administrative Council. The Administrative Council meets annually and approves the policy actions and budgets. The Technical and Development Conference serves as a platform for setting ICT standards and regulatory measures among the public and private members. Financial issues and a top-down representational approach have been some of the criticized structural issues for the ATU.

Any private entity in the ICT sector may apply for membership whether or not it is affiliated with a host country in the African Union. Nearly any type of entity involved in network technology may apply including banks, universities, consulting agencies, broadcasters, network operators, etc.

== Member states ==
The ATU has 46 member states and 16 associate members. The 46 member states include:

Central Africa (10)

- Angola
- Burundi
- Cameroon
- Central African Republic
- Chad
- Congo
- Democratic Republic of Congo
- Equatorial Guinea
- Gabon
- São Tomé and Príncipe

East Africa (6)

- Comoros
- Kenya
- Madagascar
- Mauritius
- Tanzania
- Uganda

Horn of Africa (3)

- Djibouti
- Ethiopia
- Somalia

North Africa (7)

- Algeria
- Egypt
- Libya
- Mauritania
- Morocco
- Sudan
- Tunisia

West Africa (14)

- Benin
- Burkina Faso
- Ivory Coast
- Gambia
- Ghana
- Guinea
- Guinea Bissau
- Liberia
- Mali
- Niger
- Nigeria
- Senegal
- Sierra Leone
- Togo

Southern Africa (7)

- Botswana
- Eswatini
- Lesotho
- Malawi
- South Africa
- Zambia
- Zimbabwe

The 16 associate members include:(**from ATU home)

- Cameroon Telecommunications (CAMTEL)
- Ivory Coast Telecom
- Sudan Telecom Company Limited (SUDATEL) - Sudan
- Loteny Telecom - Ivory Coast
- Botswana Telecommunications Authority (BTA) - Botswana
- Safaricom Limited - Kenya
- Telkom Kenya Ltd - Kenya
- Telecom Lesotho (PTY) Ltd - Lesotho
- P.Q. Africa - South Africa
- Vodacom (PTY) Limited - South Africa
- Zanzibar Telecom Limited (ZANTEL) - Tanzania
- Tanzania Telecommunications Company Limited (TTCL) - Tanzania
- Ghana Telecommunications Company Ltd - Ghana
- Mauritius Telecom Ltd - Mauritius
- Telecom Egypt - Egypt
- INFOTEL Consulting - Nigeria

== See also ==
- Demographics of Africa
- List of telecommunications regulatory bodies
- Asia-Pacific Telecommunity (APT)
- Caribbean Postal Union (CPU)
- Caribbean Telecommunications Union (CTU)
- European Conference of Postal and Telecommunications Administrations (CEPT)
- Postal Union of the Americas, Spain and Portugal
