= Chowdhury Jawata Afnan =

Bangladeshi actor (born 1994)

Afnan
- আফনান
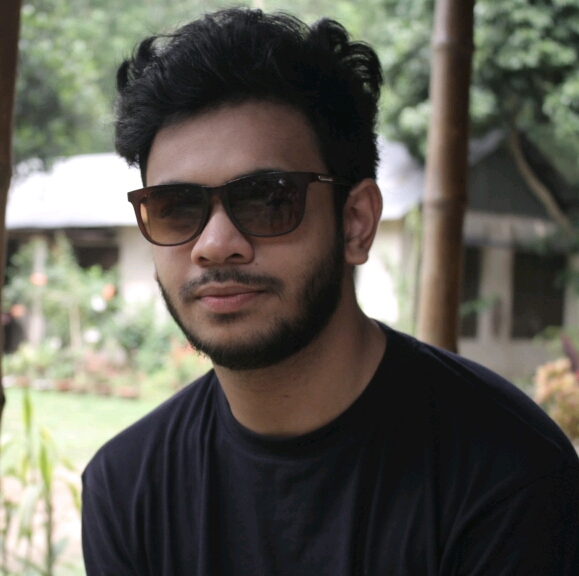
- Born: Jowata Afnan Chowdhury; August 29, 1994 (age 32); Dhaka
- Citizenship: Bangladeshi
- Education: North South University; BBA (2015–2019)
- Occupations: Student and actor
- Years active: 2011–present
- Known for: Playing the role of Rashed in Amar Bondhu Rashed
- Notable work: Amar Bondhu Rashed
- Height: 5 ft 8 in (1.73 m)
- Awards: Meril Prothom Alo Awards (2012) – Best Actor (Critics) (Amar Bondhu Rashed); Universe Multiculture Film Festival, Los Angeles (2013) – Best Child Actor (Amar Bondhu Rashed)

Signature
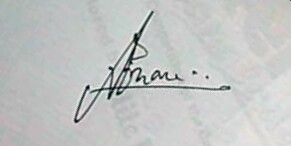

Chowdhury Jawata Afnan is a Bangladeshi film and television actor. He entered the entertainment industry through films and later acted in dramas. He made his film debut with the 2011 Bangladeshi war-based film Amar Bondhu Rashed. The film, based on the Muhammed Zafar Iqbal novel of the same name, was directed by Morshedul Islam with funding from the Government of Bangladesh. He played the lead role of Rashed in the film, for which he received wide praise from the audience.

== Early life and education ==
Afnan was born into a Muslim family in Dhaka, Bangladesh, on 29 August 1994. He completed his SSC in 2012 from Dhanmondi Government Boys' High School and HSC in 2014 from Dhaka City College. He was a BBA student (2015–2019) at North South University.

Although Afnan had an interest in acting from childhood, he did not get the opportunity. He was a fan of Hollywood films from an early age, with his favorite fictional character being Batman. While he was still in school, director Morshedul Islam came for auditions for the film Amar Bondhu Rashed. This gave him his first acting opportunity. Later, he appeared in various commercials, dramas, and telefilms.

== Career ==
Alongside his studies, Afnan continues to act in different dramas and commercials.

=== Films ===
Year	Film	Director	Note
2011	Amar Bondhu Rashed	Morshedul Islam	Afnan's debut film

=== Commercials ===
Year	Commercial	Director	Note
2013	Coca-Cola Ramadan	Piplu R Khan	–

=== Television ===
Year	Drama/Telefilm	Director	Note
2012	Kick-Off	Redwan Rony	His debut telefilm
2014	U-Turn	Redwan Rony	

== Awards and honors ==
Year	Category	Award	Film	Director	Result
2012	Best Actor (Critics)	Meril Prothom Alo Awards	Amar Bondhu Rashed	Morshedul Islam	Won
2013	Best Child Actor	Universe Multiculture Film Festival, Los Angeles	Amar Bondhu Rashed	Morshedul Islam	Won
