= Battle of Shiromoni =

Battle in the Bangladesh War of Independence

- Part of Bangladesh Liberation War and Indo-Pakistani War of 1971
Date	13 – 17 December 1971
Location	Shiromoni, Khulna, Bangladesh
Result	Bangladeshi-Indian victory

Belligerents
Bangladesh; India	Pakistan

Commanders and leaders
(Bangladesh) Abul Manzur; (Bangladesh) Joynal Abedin; (India) Gani †; (India) Mahendra Singh	(Pakistan) Hayat Khan

Units involved
Mukti Bahini; Mujib Bahini; Sector VIII; Sector IX; Indian Army; 50th Parachute Brigade; 45th Cavalry; 1st Squadron; 5th Cavalry	Pakistan Army; 107th Infantry Brigade

Casualties and losses
: 300 killed; 7 wounded; 26 armoured vehicles destroyed; : 31 killed; 124 wounded	: 157 killed; 3,700 surrendered

The Battle of Shiromoni (Bengali: শিরোমণির যুদ্ধ) (13–17 December 1971) was a battle fought during the Bangladesh War of Independence and the Indo-Pakistani War of 1971 between the Pakistan Army and the joint forces of Bangladesh and India. This was one of the last battles of the Bangladesh War of Independence which continued until 17 December 1971, even though the A. A. K. Niazi had already surrendered on 16 December 1971.

== Background ==
On 31 March 1971, five days after Bangladesh declared independence from Pakistan and waged war against the Pakistani military, members of the East Pakistan Rifles and rebels from Khulna, Satkhira, and Jessore were able to liberate the city of Jessore, Even though the city was liberated, one of the main strongholds of the Pakistani military was in Jessore Cantonment. During the Second World War when the Japanese were able to occupy Burma of the then British India (which also included present-day Pakistan and Bangladesh), the British government established Jessore Cantonment to create strong defense systems against any potential Japanese attack. As such, even after the British left and East Bengal became a region of Pakistan, the Jessore Cantonment remained as a powerful military base for Pakistan. Thus the Pakistanis were able to re-empower themselves on 3 April and 6 April; after that, the Pakistani military retook Jessore. In order to capture the city again, the Bangladeshi forces had to wait for nine months during the war, when on 6 December, they, along with their Indian allies, retook the city from the Pakistani forces. The next day, i.e. 7 December, the allied Bangladeshi and Indian forces prepared themselves to take Jessore cantonment which was full of Pakistani tanks and armor. Sensing the approach of the enemy, Pakistani troops left the cantonment with all their arsenals and tanks and moved almost fifty-four kilometers towards Shiromoni of the Khulna Division.

Even though Jessore was lost, the Pakistanis were able to develop a strong resistance system against the Bangladeshi and Indian forces at Shiromoni. Commanding the Pakistani forces at Shiromoni was Brigadier Hayat Khan of the 107th Infantry Brigade. According to the book ‘The Tank Battle of Shiromoni’ by Gazi Saiful Hasan, there were three main reasons why the Pakistanis positioned themselves at Shiromoni:

- Since the emergence of Pakistan, Shiromoni was the spot of Pakistani military training and so the Pakistan army knew this area well.
- Shiromoni was located near the EPSCIC Industrial Estate by the Bhairab River, which provided a strong geographical defense for the military
- Lastly, Brigadier Hayat Khan thought the U.S. 7th Fleet would come to their aid through the Bay of Bengal and join the Pakistani forces through the Bhairab river.

Whatever their reason, the Pakistanis prepared themselves from 7 to 12 December to fight their enemies. The Pakistanis had thirty-two tanks, besides these, the Pakistani soldiers stationed themselves on every building of Shiromoni and established their headquarters at the Shiromoni Cable Factory (now known as Bangladesh Cable Shilpa Limited). Apart from these, from the cable factory to Daulatpur, the Pakistanis set up huge number of bunkers and landmines, which established a strong defensive position for them.

On the other hand, after finding Jessore cantonment completely empty of enemy troops on 7 December, the Bangladeshi and Indian forces discovered that the Pakistanis took positions at Shiromoni. After this, Sector VIII of Mukti Bahini under the command of Major Muhammed Abul Manzur began to march towards Khulna, and on 11 December, they took position at Fultola near Shiromoni to prepare for an offensive against the Pakistani forces. Right after this, Indian forces under the command of Major Gani and Major Mahendra Singh led the Indian Rajput Regiment, with a large number of tanks to enter Bangladesh through Benapole. Indian forces joined Major Manzur's forces at Fultola. Also, members of Sector IX of the Mukti Bahini under the command of Major Joynal Abedin took positions at Gollamri and Khulna Shipyard, which was south of Shiromoni. By this time, since Khulna, Jessore, Faridpur and Kushtia had been captured, Mukti Bahini from all these areas began to surround Shiromoni from all directions.

== The Battle ==
=== Ambush at Badamtola ===
The Battle of Shiromoni officially started on 13 December. The Mukti Bahini under the command of Major Manzur started to fire heavily with machine guns at Pakistani soldiers stationed at Shiromoni. Simultaneously, the Indian forces established communication with Kolkata to launch air strikes at Shiromoni. The Pakistanis also retaliated with heavy fire through their tanks and ammunitions, but suffered immense losses. The next day, seeing no signs of aggression from the Pakistanis, Major Mahendra Singh of the Indian Army thought the Pakistanis might have left Shiromoni and retreated south towards Khulna. For this reason, they contemplated moving towards Khulna to chase the enemy. Even though Major Manzur asked the Indians to maintain caution, the Indian army under the command of Major Mahendra Singh and Major Gani took 28 vehicles and started to move towards Khulna. On their way to Khulna, after passing through Shiromoni and getting near Badamtola, the Indians faced an ambush by the Pakistani military. Of the 28 Indian vehicles, the Pakistani Army destroyed 26. In the midst of this ambush, Major Gani was killed, but Major Mahendra Singh was able to flee back towards Major Manzur's position at Fultola. Around 250 to 300 Indian soldiers were killed or injured at Badamtola.

=== Continuation: 17 December ===
Due to the strong defensive positions of the Pakistan Army, with moments of brief ceasefires, the battle continued for days until 17 December, even though the commander of Pakistani forces in East Pakistan, Lieutenant General Amir Abdullah Khan Niazi, surrendered to joint Indian and Bangladeshi forces at Dhaka on 16 December. Even though the Instrument of Surrender signed by Lt. General Niazi clearly stated that, "The PAKISTAN Eastern Command agree to surrender all PAKISTAN Armed Forces in BANGLA DESH to Lieutenant-General JAGJIT SINGH AURORA, General Officer Commanding in Chief of Indian and BANGLA DESH forces in the Eastern Theatre. This surrender includes all PAKISTAN land, air and naval forces as also all para-military forces and civil armed forces. These forces will lay down their arms and surrender at the places where they are currently located to the nearest regular troops under the command of Lieutenant-General JAGJIT SINGH AURORA", Brigadier Hayat Khan of Pakistan Army stationed at Shiromoni, however, still refused to surrender and intended to carry on the battle.

=== Command under Manzur ===
On 17 December at 3:00 am, the Bangladeshi and Indian forces faced heavy casualties: among the Indians, seven soldiers died and thirty men got injured; among the Bangladeshis, thirty-one soldiers died and more than 120 men were injured. At 3:10 am, Major Mahendra Singh again requested forces back in India to continue launching air strikes at Shiromoni, however, they were told that air strikes were impossible temporarily. Due to continuous casualties, taking a jeep with him, Major Manzur decided to go to Jessore Cantonment and re-evaluate their battle plans. After a military meeting of ten minutes, it was decided that Major Manzur would be in command of joint Bangladeshi and Indian forces at Shiromoni and Fultola. As soon as he took responsibility of his new command, Major Manzur sent a wireless message to the Sector IX Commander, Major Joynal Abedin, whose forces were still stationed south of Shiromoni at Khulna region. On receiving Major Manzur's message, Major Joynal Abedin with the aid of Sector IX Mukti Bahini and fighters from Satkhira and other regions of Khulna began to attack the Pakistani defense positions at southern Shiromoni and started to slowly move towards Shiromoni. By this time, in the north, Major Manzur moved back near Shiromoni and took charge of his new command and set new battle tactics for the mission. Major Manzur decided that they were no longer going to wait for Indian airstrikes at dawn and face more casualties. Instead they were going to face the enemy head-on. Firstly, he brought the Mukti Bahini fighters stationed at the right of Shiromoni to the second line of defence in the frontline and sent the Indian soldiers at the frontline to the right of Shiromoni. Two commandos on the left side and three commandos on the back side were put on the frontline defense, while the other Indian soldiers were posted at the back side of the defense. Manzur then ordered two Indian tanks to move towards Shiromoni using the main road and ordered an additional six tanks to attack the Pakistani strong positions from the right side. Behind each of these tanks, Major Manzur deployed Mukti Bahini men to the region.

With 25 or more Pakistani tanks in front of them, Major Manzur and his commando force began to advance towards the enemy tanks amidst heavy fire from tanks and hundreds of mortars. They breached the Pakistani lines and began to destroy tanks and cannons. They began to throw grenades inside any Pakistani tanks which had their hatches open. This helped reduce the Pakistani soldiers’ morale, and many of them began to abandon their tanks and desert their positions.

On the other side, the Indian forces at the back still had no clue whether Major Manzur was still alive or not. Around this time, message from the front line reached the Indian soldiers that Major Manzur was still alive and the Pakistanis were slowly retreating. By six o’clock, it was already sunup and, as planned, the Indian airstrikes finally arrived to lay the final nail in the coffin of the Pakistani frontline defense. With 157 of his men killed, Brigadier Hayat Khan agreed to surrender to Major Manzur.

== Surrender of Brigadier Hayat Khan ==
On that day, at around 1:30 pm, Brigadier Hayat Khan, along with his 3,700 men, officially surrendered to joint Bangladeshi and Indian forces on the premises of Khulna Circuit House. Fifteen kilometers away from Shiromoni, Brigadier Delvar Singh of the Indian Army, who arrived at the surrender ceremony via helicopter, signed the document for the Pakistani surrender on behalf of the allied forces. The instrument of surrender was signed at 1:55 pm.
