= Doel (computer) =

Bangladeshi laptop computer

Logo of Doel Laptops

Doel (Bengali: দোয়েল) was a laptop assembled in Bangladesh as part of a circa 2011 national education program. It is assembled by Telephone Shilpa Sangstha. It was the first laptop made in Bangladesh. The first laptop produced was launched for US$130 in 2011. The OS used is Android or Microsoft Windows (e.g. XP Home, Vista Starter or Home Basic).

The computer's name comes from the national bird of Bangladesh, the doel or Oriental magpie robin. In 2011, the eventual plan was to distribute Doel and other computers to every K-12 student in Bangladesh, along with free software (such as Edubuntu or Sugar) for education and open educational resources. Bangladesh had digitized an entire suite of textbooks in the Bengali language for free distribution.

In the event, the project faced technical and fund problems, and by 2016, was in limbo.

And in 2024 it was reported that the project faced a collapse due to irregularities, mismanagement, and corruption within Telephone Shilpa Sangstha (TSS), Bangladesh.
