= Saudi-Bangladesh Industrial and Agricultural Investment Company Limited =

- Logo
- Formation: 1984
- Headquarters: Nikunja-2, Dhaka, Bangladesh
- Region served: Bangladesh
- Official language: Bengali
- Chairman: Sultan Abdul Rauf
- Website: sabinco.com.bd

Saudi-Bangladesh Industrial and Agricultural Investment Company Limited is an investment and finance company owned by the government of Bangladesh and the government of Saudi Arabia.

== History ==
In 1984, the Government of Bangladesh and the Government of Saudi Arabia signed an agreement to establish Saudi-Bangladesh Industrial and Agricultural Investment Company Limited. On 24 June 1984, it was incorporated in Bangladesh.

Bangladesh Bank classified 31. 46% of the outstanding loans of Saudi-Bangladesh Industrial and Agricultural Investment Company Limited as classified in 2007. It was part of a syndicate of 12 financial institutions that provided 1.01 billion taka to RanksTel, a concern of the Rangs Group. It owns 20 percent of the shares of CMC-Kamal Textile Mills which is a concern of the Lotus-Kamal Group owned by Mustafa Kamal, the former Minister of Panning and the Minister of Finance.

It was a part of a syndicated loan of 1.26 billion taka provided to Esquire Group.

In 2011, Saudi-Bangladesh Industrial and Agricultural Investment Company Limited was part of the BRAC Bank led syndicate to provide 1.09 billion in financing to City Group to expand City Seed Crushing Industries Ltd.

Saudi-Bangladesh Industrial and Agricultural Investment Company Limited decided in 2012 to sell off its loss making concerns. The companies it was selling were Bangladesh Cat Fish Ltd, Saudi-Bangla Fish Feed Ltd, S&M Shrimp Culture Ltd, and Gazi Fish Ltd. It made 400 million taka in profit in 2011. It was part of a syndicate of 15 financial banks which provided a 8.46 billion taka loan to Grameenphone in 2012. It was part of a Standard Chartered Bank led syndicate that provided 920 million in funding to The ACME Laboratories Ltd.

Anti-Corruption Commission sued Morshed Khan, chairman of Pacific Bangladesh Telecom Limited, and other company officials for embezzling 3.83 billion taka of which 230 million came from Saudi-Bangladesh Industrial and Agricultural Investment Company Limited on 29 June 2017.

Saudi-Bangladesh Industrial and Agricultural Investment Company Limited was part of the a Dhaka Bank led syndicate to provide 4.59 billion in funding to BSRM Group to establish a wire factory titled BSRM Wires in 2019. It was part of a syndicate led by Eastern Bank Limited that provided BanglaCAT (Bangla Trac Group) 4.65 billion taka loan Bangla Trac Power Unit-2.

Ahmed Ehsanul Karim was appointed managing director of Saudi-Bangladesh Industrial and Agricultural Investment Company Limited on 25 October 2021.

In January 2022, it was part of a group of financial institutions that provided a 5.2 billion taka loan to Chandpur Power Generations Limited which is a part of Doreen Group.

== Board of directors ==
- Sultan Abdulrauf
- Abdur Rouf Talukder
- Mohammed Al Shuhail
- Fatima Yasmin
- Mohammed Musfir Al Malki
- Mohammad Salahuddin
