= Startup Bangladesh Limited =

- Formation: 2020
- Headquarters: Dhaka, Bangladesh
- Region served: Bangladesh
- Official language: Bengali
- Website: www.startupbangladesh.vc

Startup Bangladesh Limited is a venture capital fund founded and owned by the government of Bangladesh.

== History ==
Startup Bangladesh Limited was established in March 2020 as a startup venture capital fund under the Information and Communication Technology Division of the Ministry of Posts, Telecommunications and Information Technology. The Division sought 500 million BDT from the Ministry of Finance to launch the company.

To celebrate Sheikh Mujibur Rahman's 100th birth anniversary, Startup Bangladesh Limited launched the ShotoBorshe Shoto Asha project to provide 5000 million BDT in funds to startups in 2021. Startup Bangladesh Limited invested 50 million BDT in Chaldal in 2022. It invested 20 million BDT in January 2024 in Hishab Technologies Limited, an AI startup.

In July 2024, Startup Bangladesh Limited canceled its 50 BDT million investment proposal for the 10-Minute School without stating a reason. The decision follows public posts by 10 Minute School CEO Ayman Sadiq supporting the 2024 Bangladesh quota reform movement. His viral posts and protest statements came after violent clashes at the University of Dhaka involving quota protesters. This was reversed after the fall of the Sheikh Hasina led Awami League government.

Startup Bangladesh Limited announced in January 2025 that it had invested 111 million BDT in startups over the past six months, supporting established names like 10 Minute School, ShareTrip, and Sheba Platform; and new ventures like ParentsCare and Dubotech Digital. It also came out that during the Awami League government rule, Startup Bangladesh Limited denied funding to businesses who were not close to the government.
