= Ministry of Posts, Telecommunications and Information Technology =

Government ministry of Bangladesh

- ডাক, টেলিযোগাযোগ ও তথ্য প্রযুক্তি বিষয়ক মন্ত্রণালয়
- Government Seal of Bangladesh

Ministry overview
- Formed: 10 February 2014; 12 years ago
- Preceding agencies: Ministry of Posts and Telecommunications; Ministry of Communications and Information Technology
- Jurisdiction: Government of Bangladesh
- Headquarters: Posts and Telecommunications Division, Bangladesh Secretariat; ICT Tower, Agargaon, Dhaka
- Annual budget: ৳4190 crore (US$340 million) (2026-2027)
- Minister responsible: Fakir Mahbub Anam Swapan, Minister of PTICT
- Ministry executives: Dr. Md. Mushfiqur Rahman, Secretary, Posts and Telecommunications Division; Shish Haider Chowdhury, Secretary, Information Communication Technology
- Child agencies: Posts and Telecommunications Division; Information and Communication Technology Division
- Website: www.ptd.gov.bd www.ictd.gov.bd

The Ministry of Posts, Telecommunications and Information Technology (Bengali: ডাক, টেলিযোগাযোগ ও তথ্য প্রযুক্তি বিষয়ক মন্ত্রণালয়, romanized: Ḍāk, Ṭēliyōyōgājōg ō Tôthyo Projukti Biṣôẏôk Montronaloy) is a ministry of the Government of Bangladesh responsible for postal services, telecommunications policy and regulation, and the development and governance of information technology in the country.

== History ==
Following the 2001 general election, the Ministry of Science and Technology (Bangladesh) was renamed on 18 September 2002 to become the Ministry of Science and Information & Communication Technology. To give more thrust for ICT sector the Information & Communication Technology Division was separated from Science and Technology ministry and it has upgraded as Ministry of Information & Communication Technology on 4 December 2011. The change is the evidence of understanding of the importance of ICT from the highest policy level and also an indication that the government is keen to keep pace with modern changing world. After 2014 election Ministry of Posts and Telecommunications and Ministry of ICT are integrated to Ministry of Posts, Telecommunications and Information Technology.

== Operational functions ==
The Administrative Arrangements Order made on 14 September 2015 detailed the following responsibilities to the ministry:

- Broadband policy and programs
- Postal and telecommunications policies and programs
- Spectrum policy management
- National policy issues relating to the digital economy
- Content policy relating to the information economy

== Posts and Telecommunications Division ==
Organization of Posts and Telecommunications Division:

- Bangladesh Telecommunication Regulatory Commission
- Bangladesh Post Office
- Bangladesh Telecommunications Company Ltd
- Bangladesh Submarine Cable Company Limited
- Teletalk Bangladesh Ltd
- Telephone Shilpa Sangstha
- Bangladesh Cable Shilpa Limited
- Department of Information and Communication Technology

== Information and Communication Technology Division ==
Organization of Information and Communication Technology Division:

- Bangladesh Hi-Tech Park Authority
- Department of Information and Communication Technology
- Bangladesh Computer Council
- Controller of Certifying Authority
