= Controller of Certifying Authority =

Bangladeshi government agency

- Formation: 1973
- Headquarters: Dhaka, Bangladesh
- Region served: Bangladesh
- Official language: Bengali
- Website: Controller of Certifying Authority

Controller of Certifying Authority (কন্ট্রোলার অব সার্টিফাইং অথরিটিজ) is a government agency responsible for the digitization of government services and procurement procedures and is located in Dhaka, Bangladesh. It promotes electronic signature to encourage e-commerce in Bangladesh.

== History ==
Controller of Certifying Authority was established in May 2011 according to the Information and Communication Technology (Amended) Act, 2006. The agency is run by a government appointed controller. The agency has been given the responsibility to introduce Digital Signature and electronic signatures in government departments of Bangladesh. The agency is responsible for public key infrastructure of the Bangladeshi government. It prescribes Digital Signature Certificate.
