= Information and Communication Technology Division =

Government agency of Bangladesh

- Bengali: তথ্য ও যোগাযোগ প্রযুক্তি বিভাগ
- Seal of ICT Division

Division overview
- Formed: 10 February 2014; 12 years ago
- Jurisdiction: Government of Bangladesh
- Headquarters: ICT Tower, Bangladesh Secretariat, Agargaon, Dhaka
- Division executive: 𝐌𝐝 𝐌𝐚𝐦𝐮𝐧𝐮𝐫 𝐑𝐚𝐬𝐡𝐢𝐝 𝐁𝐡𝐮𝐢𝐲𝐚𝐧, Secretary
- Parent department: Ministry of Posts, Telecommunications and Information Technology
- Website: ictd.gov.bd

The Information and Communication Technology Division (Bengali: তথ্য ও যোগাযোগ প্রযুক্তি বিভাগ), abbreviated to ICT Division, is a Ministerial Division of the Ministry of Posts, Telecommunications and Information Technology of the executive branch of the Government of Bangladesh.

== Units ==
The following units function under the ICT Division:

- Bangladesh Hi-Tech Park
- Department of Information and Communication Technology
- Bangladesh Computer Council
- Controller of Certifying Authority
- Cyber Security Agency
- National Cyber Security Council
- Startup Bangladesh Limited
- Bangladesh Data Centre Company Limited
- Aspire to Innovate
