= Bangladesh Cable Shilpa Limited =

Bangladeshi state-owned company

- বাংলাদেশ ক্যাবল শিল্প লিমিটেড
- Abbreviation: BCSL
- Formation: 1967
- Type: Cable manufacturer, importer, exporter
- Headquarters: Shiromoni, Khulna, Bangladesh
- Location: Khulna
- Coordinates: 22°54′27.86″N 89°30′56.42″E
- Region served: Bangladesh
- Official language: Bengali
- Managing Director: Jagadish Chandra Mandal
- Parent organization: Bangladesh Post & Telecommunication Division, Ministry of Posts, Telecommunications and Information Technology
- Staff: 421
- Website: www.bcsl.gov.bd

Bangladesh Cable Shilpa Limited or BCSL is a state owned company of the Government of Bangladesh, located on the bank of the Bhairab River in the Shiromoni Industrial Area of Khulna City.

== History ==
The company was incorporated on 6 November 1967 as Cable Industries of Pakistan in Khulna. It went into commercial production in 1973. In 2011, it started producing fiber optic cable. As of 2010, the company had been able to make profit every year. Its yearly revenue in 2010 exceeded 1 billion BDT ($14.4M in 2010).
