= Department of Information and Communication Technology =

- তথ্য ও যোগাযোগ প্রযুক্তি অধিদপ্তর
- Crest of Department of Information and Communication Technology
- Abbreviation: DoICT
- Formation: 31 July 2013
- Type: Governmental
- Purpose: Information and communication technology projects
- Headquarters: Dhaka, Bangladesh
- Region served: Bangladesh
- Official language: Bengali
- Website: doict.gov.bd

The Department of Information and Communication Technology (Bengali: তথ্য ও যোগাযোগ প্রযুক্তি অধিদপ্তর) is a government department responsible for information and communication technology projects in Bangladesh. It is located in Dhaka, Bangladesh.

== History ==
The Department of Information and Communication Technology was established on 1 July 2013 as part of the Bangladesh Awami League governments digital Bangladesh policy under the Ministry of Posts, Telecommunications and Information Technology. The department plans to establish computer labs in all schools across Bangladesh.
