= Pickaboo =

Pickaboo.com
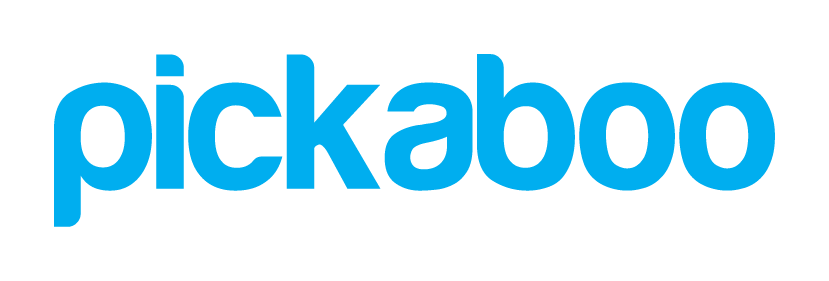
- Website type: E-commerce website
- Available in: Bengali, English
- Founded: 2016
- Headquarters: Dhaka 1212, Bangladesh
- Owner: Silver Water Technologies Bangladesh Limited
- Founders: Arun Gupta, Aminur Rashid, Morin Talukder
- Chairperson: Aminur Rashid
- CEO: Morin Talukder, CEO
- Employees: 100+
- Parent: SILVER WATER TECHNOLOGIES SINGAPORE PTE. LTD
- Website: Pickaboo.com
- Commercial: Yes
- Registration: 2016
- Current status: Active

Pickaboo is an e-commerce website headquartered in Dhaka, Bangladesh. The company was founded in 2016 and is registered under Silver Water Technologies Bangladesh Limited. Items sold by the company include electronics and other products.

In December 2022, they raised funding to set up physical stores.
