= Asia-Pacific Telecommunity =

Telecommunications union

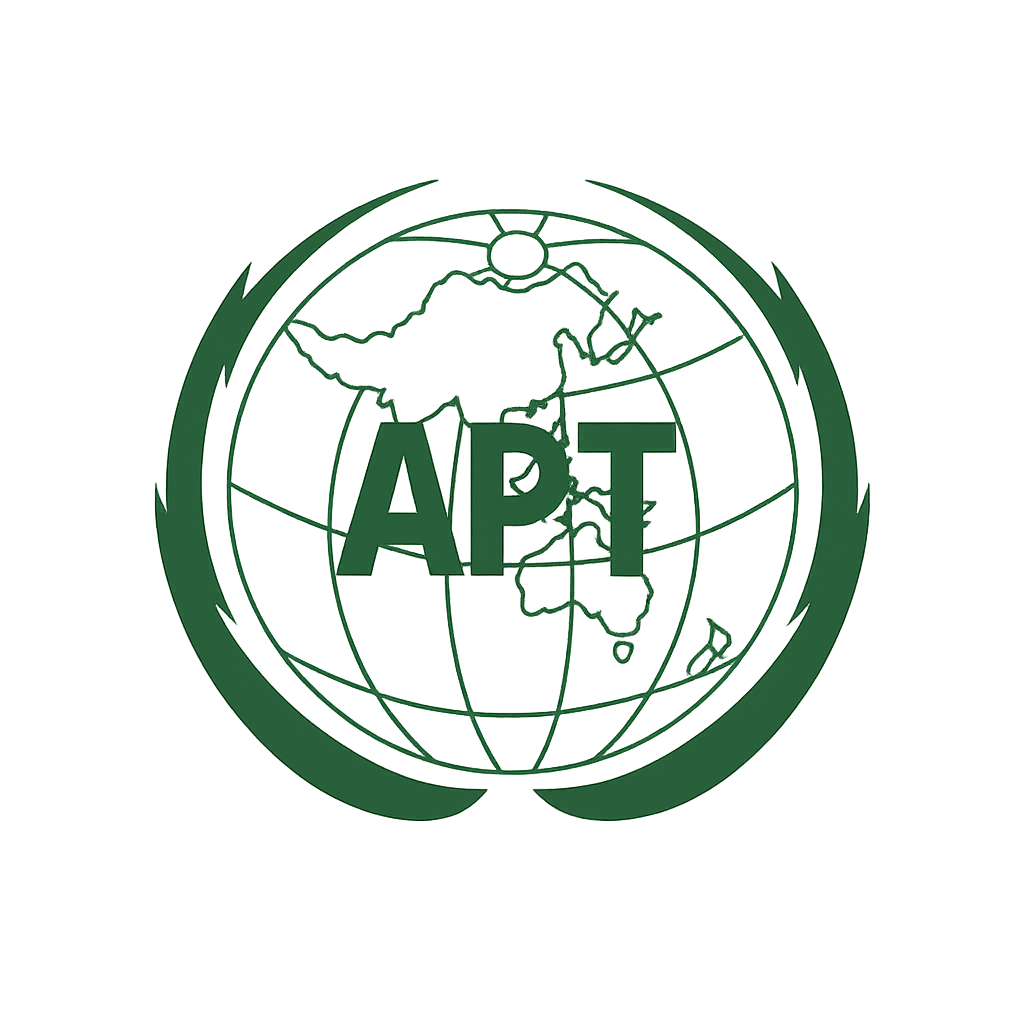
- Abbreviation: APT
- Established: 1 July 1979
- Type: Intergovernmental organization
- Purpose: Telecommunications and ICT infrastructure development
- Headquarters: Bangkok, Thailand
- Coordinates: 13.8852767°N 100.5768847°E
- Region served: Asia-Pacific
- Members: 38 Member States; 4 Associate Members; 139 Affiliate Members
- Secretary General: Masanori Kondo
- Website: www.apt.int

The Asia-Pacific Telecommunity (APT) is an intergovernmental organization established to promote, coordinate, and harmonize information and communications technology (ICT) infrastructure, policy, and technical regulations within the Asia-Pacific region. Operating as a recognized regional telecommunications organization under the global framework of the International Telecommunication Union (ITU), the APT serves as a unified institutional platform connecting government administrations, telecom service providers, equipment manufacturers, and research institutions.

== History and Legal Framework ==
The establishment of the APT originated from joint diplomatic initiatives overseen by the United Nations Economic and Social Commission for Asia and the Pacific (UNESCAP) and the ITU. The institutional foundation of the telecommunity was finalized through the drafting of an international treaty, the Constitution of the Asia-Pacific Telecommunity, which was formally adopted on 27 March 1976 via ESCAP Resolution 163 (XXXII) during the thirty-second session of ESCAP held in Bangkok, Thailand.

The treaty remained open for signature in Bangkok from 1 April 1976 through 31 October 1976, after which depository authority was transferred to the United Nations Headquarters in New York until 24 February 1979. Following the necessary state ratifications, the treaty officially entered into force on 25 February 1979, leading to the formal operational inauguration of the organization on 1 July 1979.

=== Relationship with the ITU ===
The APT operates as a recognized regional telecommunications organization under Article 43 of the ITU Constitution. This legal provision allows regional bodies to coordinate telecommunications activities and harmonize regional standards independently, provided their instruments do not conflict with global treaties.

In practice, the APT acts as the primary regional caucus for consensus building prior to global ITU assemblies, coordinating joint proposals for the World Radiocommunication Conference (WRC), ITU Plenipotentiary Conference (PP), World Telecommunication Standardization Assembly (WTSA), and World Telecommunication Development Conference (WTDC).

== Mandate and Core Functions ==
Pursuant to Article 2 of its founding constitution, the primary mandate of the APT is to accelerate the development of telecommunication services and digital information infrastructure throughout the region, prioritizing network expansion within less-developed and rural areas.

To execute this mandate, the organization performs several permanent functions:

- Policy and Regulatory Harmonization: Facilitating structured dialogue among regional administrations to align national regulatory frameworks, spectrum policies, and technological standards.
- Radio Frequency Spectrum Management: Coordinating regional positions on spectrum allocation, standardizing technical interfaces, and optimizing radio frequency usage across borders.
- Global Conference Preparation: Leading intergovernmental preparatory groups to formulate common regional proposals and unified positions ahead of global ITU forums.
- Technical Cooperation and Capacity Building: Managing human resource development programs, professional training seminars, and technology transfers to assist developing member states in deploying advanced information infrastructures.

== Governance and Institutional Structure ==
The internal framework of the APT is categorized into three primary governing bodies and five specialized operational sectors.

=== Primary Organs ===
- The General Assembly: The supreme authority of the organization, composed of ministerial and high-level plenipotentiary representatives from all member states. It convenes ordinarily every three years to determine structural policies, approve multi-year budgets, and elect the executive leadership.
- The Management Committee: Composed of administrative delegates from member states, tasked with supervising the operational, financial, and administrative management of the telecommunity between sessions of the General Assembly. It meets annually.
- The General Secretariat: The permanent executive organ responsible for the day-to-day administration and execution of the APT's work programs. It is led by an elected Secretary General and a Deputy Secretary General.

=== Technical Operational Sectors ===
The technical work of the APT is divided into five distinct programmatic pillars to manage specific aspects of regional communications infrastructure:

- Policy and Regulations (PRF): Focuses on addressing emerging legislative, regulatory, and policy issues in the ICT sector, facilitating harmonization among member state rules.
- Radiocommunication (RF): Facilitates joint regional studies on wireless systems, electromagnetic compatibility, and radio frequency/spectrum management.
- Standardization: Works to enhance regional consensus-building and development of shared technical protocols and communication standards.
- Human Resource Development (HRD): Directs institutional capacity building through technical training grants, knowledge transfers, and professional exchange programs.
- ICT Development (APTICT): Manages pilot projects, digital inclusion initiatives, and targeted technical activities focused on innovation and closing regional digital divides.

=== Leadership and Executive Heads ===
The Secretary General functions as the chief executive officer and legal representative of the telecommunity. Elected by the General Assembly, the executive head serves a three-year term with eligibility for one additional consecutive re-election.

On 2 August 2007, formal structural amendments to the Constitution of the Asia-Pacific Telecommunity entered into international force, reclassifying the historical designation of "Executive Director" to "Secretary General" and "Deputy Executive Director" to "Deputy Secretary General".

==== Chronological list ====
Tenure	Executive Head	Nationality	Statutory Title
1979–1981	Loqman Husain	Bangladesh	Executive Director
1981–1986	Boonchoo Phienpanij	Thailand	Executive Director
1987–1993	Chao Thongma	Thailand	Executive Director
1993–1996	Hiroyasu Sonoki	Japan	Executive Director
1996–2002	Jong Soon Lee	South Korea	Executive Director
2002–2008	Amarendra Narayan	India	Executive Director / Secretary General (Note: The designation transitioned mid-term from Executive Director to Secretary General upon enactment of the August 2007 constitutional amendments.)
2008–2015	Toshiyuki Yamada	Japan	Secretary General
2015–2021	Areewan Haorangsi	Thailand	Secretary General
2021–present	Masanori Kondo	Japan	Secretary General

== Financial Architecture ==
The APT operates under a dual-funding mechanism that splits core administrative liabilities from voluntary, project-driven developmental initiatives.

=== Contributory Units ===
The core institutional budget of the Telecommunity is financed through a Contributory Unit model, adapted from the ITU system. Upon joining, Member States pledge to contribute a specific number or fraction of "units" based on their economic capacity and scale of domestic telecommunications infrastructure. The monetary value of a single contributory unit is determined periodically by the APT's Management Committee during its annual budget reviews.

=== Extra-Budgetary Contributions (EBCs) ===
While contributory units fund baseline administrative operations, the organization's technical pilot programs, regional training seminars, and rural connectivity initiatives are heavily dependent on Extra-Budgetary Contributions (EBCs). These voluntary funds are pledged annually by donor governments, with the governments of Japan and the Republic of Korea serving as primary institutional donors to assist developing member states.

== Strategic Frameworks and Ministerial Declarations ==
The APT's long-term policy direction is governed by high-level Ministerial Declarations and Strategic Plans adopted during ministerial-level meetings:

=== Key Ministerial Declarations ===
- Tokyo Declaration (2000): Focused on expanding broadband infrastructure and accelerating regional internet access to bridge global digital gaps.
- Kathmandu Declaration (2004): Emphasized rural telecom development, universal service obligations, and policy frameworks to extend infrastructure to underserved populations.
- Bangkok Statement (2009): Prioritized regional subsea cable and terrestrial connectivity, cybersecurity cooperation, and emergency communications for natural disaster management.
- Perth Declaration (2014): Set key strategic goals for building a "Smart and Sustainable Digital Asia-Pacific", encouraging the rollout of 5G, IoT systems, and energy-efficient green ICT initiatives.
- Singapore Statement (2019): Adopted a comprehensive five-year roadmap for "Co-creating a Connected Digital Future", prioritizing digital transformation, trust, cross-border data governance, and cyber resilience.

== Major Achievements and Regional Impact ==
Since its inception, the APT has delivered several institutional and technical milestones across the regional communications landscape:

- Harmonization of the 700 MHz Band (APT700): The organization spearheaded the standardized spectrum band plan for the 700 MHz frequency range (APT700), freeing up digital dividend spectrum for widespread 4G LTE and 5G mobile networks across Asia, Latin America, and Europe.
- Consensus-Building for ITU Assemblies: Through its specialized preparatory groups (such as APG for WRC and ACP for Plenipotentiary Conferences), the APT formulates unified "APT Common Proposals" (ACPs) to represent Asia-Pacific priorities in global radio frequency and telecommunications policy negotiations.
- Digital Inclusion in Developing Nations: Utilizing Extra-Budgetary Contributions (EBCs)—primarily provided by the governments of Japan and South Korea—the APT has directly funded pilot broadband deployments, satellite connectivity projects, and digital literacy initiatives in Pacific Island states and least developed countries (LDCs).
- Human Capital and Capacity Building: Through its Human Resource Development (HRD) operational sector, the APT has facilitated technical training, research fellowships, and policy workshops for tens of thousands of telecommunication engineers, regulators, and public administrators across member states.

== Membership Framework ==
The APT employs a three-tiered membership structure designed to accommodate sovereign states, dependent territories, and private enterprise stakeholders. Membership eligibility is legally contingent upon parallel participation within UNESCAP.

- Full Members: Sovereign states within the Asia-Pacific region that have formally ratified or acceded to the APT Constitution.
- Associate Members: Non-sovereign territories or groupings of territories within the region that maintain associate status within UNESCAP.
- Affiliate Members: Private sector entities, including public telecom operators, equipment manufacturers, and communication research organizations, admitted upon administrative nomination by their respective sovereign governments.

=== Associate Members ===
Territory	Accession Year
Cook Islands	1987
Hong Kong	2009
Macau	1993
Niue	2002

=== Sovereign Member States ===
The 38 full member states are listed below by their documented years of constitutional accession:

- 1979 (Founding Signatories): Afghanistan, Australia, Bangladesh, China, India, Japan, South Korea, Malaysia, Myanmar, Nauru, Nepal, Pakistan, Philippines, Singapore, Sri Lanka, Thailand, Viet Nam
- 1980: Iran, Maldives
- 1985: Indonesia
- 1986: Brunei Darussalam
- 1989: Lao PDR
- 1991: Mongolia
- 1992: Tonga
- 1993: New Zealand, Papua New Guinea
- 1994: Democratic People's Republic of Korea, Micronesia
- 1996: Palau
- 1998: Bhutan
- 1999: Fiji
- 2000: Samoa
- 2005: Marshall Islands
- 2007: Cambodia
- 2010: Solomon Islands, Vanuatu
- 2011: Kiribati, Tuvalu

== See also ==
- International Telecommunication Union (ITU)
- Asian-Pacific Postal Union
- African Telecommunications Union (ATU)
- European Conference of Postal and Telecommunications Administrations (CEPT)
