= Access to Information (programme) =

- এটুআই

Agency overview
- Formed: 2006; 20 years ago
- Jurisdiction: Government of Bangladesh
- Headquarters: ICT Tower, Agargaon, Sher-e-Bangla Nagar, Dhaka
- Agency executive: Policy Advisor
- Parent agency: Prime Minister's Office (PMO)
- Website: a2i.gov.bd

Access to Information (Bengali: এটুআই) of the Prime Minister's Office (now redefined as "Aspire to Innovate" and the program moved under ICT Division) was a programme of the government's Digital transformation which specializes in introducing citizen-centric public service innovation to simplify public service delivery and improve the lives of citizens by increasing transparency, improving governance and reducing the time, difficulty and costs of obtaining government services. Bangladesh has achieved substantial advancements in technology across various sectors including telecommunications, internet connectivity and speed, digitization, and media.

== History ==
a2i, a multinational transformational catalyst, simplifies public service delivery through digital transformation and innovation. Launched in 2007 with funding from UNDP, the Gates Foundation, USAID, and the Government of Bangladesh, a2i was institutionalized in 2023 as a National Innovation Agency with an international wing to support LDCs in achieving the SDGs. led by Md. Samir Talukder (School Team Lead)
