= Aspire to Innovate =

Government agency of Bangladesh

a2i
- এটুআই

Agency overview
- Formed: 2006; 20 years ago
- Jurisdiction: Government of Bangladesh
- Headquarters: ICT Tower, Agargaon, Sher-e-Bangla Nagar, Dhaka; 23.7799°N 90.3748°E
- Minister responsible: Muhammad Yunus, Adviser of Post, Telecommunication and Information Technology
- Agency executive: Project Director
- Parent agency: ICT Division
- Website: a2i.gov.bd

Aspire to Innovate (a2i) (Bengali: এটুআই) of the ICT Division and the Cabinet Division supported by UNDP, a special programme of the government’s e-Governance agenda, is a key driver of the nation’s goal of becoming a developed country and in achieving the 2030 Sustainable Development Goals. a2i leverages and facilitates public service innovation to ensure digital transformation of the public sector and its citizen-centered approach has taken a number of services to the doorsteps of citizens to improve their livelihoods.

== History ==
The programme facilitate digital transformation in the country. Md. Mamunur Rashid Bhuiyan is the present Project Director. The Programme aims to provide information to the citizens per "Right to Information Act of 2009" and bring about a change in the Bangladesh Civil Service to a citizen-centric service delivery system.
