= Telephone Shilpa Sangstha =

- Formation: 1967
- Headquarters: Dhaka, Bangladesh
- Region served: Bangladesh
- Official language: Bengali
- Website: Telephone Shilpa Sangstha

Telephone Shilpa Sangstha or TSS is a government owned telecoms company in Bangladesh. It launched the first laptop made/assembled in Bangladesh, Doel, in 2011. It also manufactures analogue phones, smartphones, and regular cell phones in Bangladesh.

== Production ==
In fiscal 2016-17 the TSS assembled 63,245 laptops and managed to sell 58,750 units.

In fiscal 2016-17, 4,495 units were sold; in fiscal 2014-15, it was 4,550 units.

It started off with a laptop retailing at Tk 10,000, which Prime Minister Sheikh Hasina unveiled on 11 October 2011.
