= Bangladesh Trade and Tariff Commission =

Government agency

- Formation: 28 July 1973
- Headquarters: Dhaka, Bangladesh
- Region served: Bangladesh
- Official language: Bengali
- Chairman: Nasir-Ud-Doula (Secretary)
- Website: www.btc.gov.bd

The Bangladesh Trade and Tariff Commission (BTTC) is a national statutory body that is responsible for placing tariffs on imports, protecting domestic industry, and preventing dumping of foreign goods in Bangladesh and is located in Dhaka, Bangladesh. The present chairman of the commission is Moinul Khan.

== History ==
The Bangladesh Trade and Tariff Commission traces its origin to the East Pakistan branch of the Pakistan Tariff Commission. The commission was established on 28 July 1973. It is responsible for the protection of domestic industry and regulation of imports. The commission is weak according to its own commissioner. In 2007, it was accused by the Federation of Bangladesh Chambers of Commerce and Industry of failing to stop the dumping of sugar by Indian exporters.

== Activities ==
The main task of the Bangladesh Trade and Tariff Commission is to protect the interests of domestic industries. The Company provides necessary assistance to the Government in negotiating and implementing international, bilateral, regional, and multilateral trade agreements. Under the terms of the World Trade Organization (WTO), the commission works to protect, develop, and expand local industries. Assisting the government in formulating working approaches for duty-free access to Bangladeshi goods at an international level and free access to human resources. According to the application of the industrial organization, the commission made recommendations on the analysis of the production cost of the product, import of raw materials, cost of the finished product, manpower, production capacity, value addition, quality of the product produced, etc. The commission uses a number of economic indicators to analyze the data.
