= List of radio stations in Bangladesh =

Radio broadcasts commenced in what is now known as Bangladesh in 1939 under British rule, as a part of All India Radio. The state-owned Bangladesh Betar monopolized the radio industry of the country until the launch of Radio Metrowave in 1999. The first FM radio station in Bangladesh, Bangladesh Betar Traffic Broadcasting, commenced transmissions in 2005, and the first privately owned FM radio station, Radio Today, commenced transmissions in 2006. There are currently 25 privately owned FM radio stations on the air in Bangladesh. This is a list of radio stations that are legally permitted by the Bangladesh Telecommunication Regulatory Commission.

== State-owned radio stations ==
Channel	Note(s)
Bangladesh Betar (বাংলাদেশ বেতার)	A state-owned radio broadcasting station of Bangladesh, headquartered in Agargaon Sher e Bangla Nagar, Dhaka, Bangladesh. Bangladesh Betar was established during the War of Liberation of Bangladesh in 1971. It was also known as Shwadin Bangla and Betar Kendra. Post independence of Bangladesh, it was named as Bangladesh Betar. In 1975 after the coup d'état the rebels renamed it as "Radio Bangladesh" and so it continued up until 1996 where it returned to its original name Bangladesh Betar when Bangladesh Awami League came into power in 1996.

== State-owned FM radio stations ==
This list is for state-owned FM radio stations only.

Name	Frequencies (MHz)	Area served
Bangladesh Betar Traffic Broadcasting	88.8 MHz	Dhaka
FM91.60	91.60	
FM92.0	92.0	Thakurgaon
FM97.6	97.6	
FM100.0	100.0	
FM100.8	100.8	Cox's Bazar
FM101.2	101.2	
FM102.0	102.0	
FM103.2	103.2	
FM103.6	103.6	
FM104.0	104.0	Chapainawabganj
FM105.2	105.2	
FM105.6	105.6	
FM106.0	106.0	

== Privately owned radio stations ==
As of 2019, the Ministry of Information had licensed 28 private organizations for FM broadcasting, and the Bangladesh Telecommunication Regulatory Commission had assigned FM broadcasting spectrum to them. At present, there are 23 FM radio stations broadcast in Bangladesh, and 5 are temporarily closed.

Name	FM frequencies (MHz)	Activity
Radio Foorti	88.0	Active
Radio Aamar	88.4	Dead
ABC Radio	89.2	Dead
Radio Today	89.6	Active
DhakaFM	90.4	Active
Asian Radio	90.8	Dead
Radio Dhoni	91.2	Dead
Peoples Radio	91.6	Active
Radio Shadhin	92.4	Active
Radio Bhumi	92.8	Active
Radio Next	93.2	Dead
Radio Din Raat	93.6	Active
Radio Dhol	94.0	Dead
Jago FM	94.4	Active
Radio Capital FM	94.8	Active
Bangla Radio	95.2	Active
Radio Edge	95.6	Dead
City FM	96.0	Dead
Spice FM	96.4	Active
Radio Prime	96.8	Dead
Times Radio	97.2	Dead
Desh Radio	98.0	Dead
Radio Ekattor	98.4	Active
Radio City	99.6	Dead
BBC News	100.0	Active
Radio Active	100.4	Dead
Colours FM	101.6	Dead
Radio Amber	102.4	Active
Sufi FM	102.8	Active

== Community radio ==
The Bangladesh NGOs Network for Radio and Communication (BNNRC), in special consultative status with the United Nations Economic and Social Council, considers community radio a special area for intervention. BNNRC has been promoting advocacy to the government in relation to community radio with other organizations since its emergence in 2000. As a result, The Ministry of Information of the People's Republic of Bangladesh announced the Community Radio Installation, Broadcast and Operation Policy 2008. Under this policy, The Ministry of Information approved 19 community radio stations for the first time in Bangladeshi history. To ensure the free flow of information to the people, the government enacted the Right to Information Act 2009.

Initially, the government approved 19 community groups:

Name	Area served	Frequencies (FM)
Radio Meghna	COAST Trust, Chorfasson, Bhola Island (Bhola District)	99.0
Radio Bikrampur	EC Bangladesh (Munshiganj)	99.2
Chilmari	Kurigram	99.2
Radio Jhinuk	Srizoni (Jhinaidhah)	99.2
Radio Mukti	Bogra	99.2
Borendro Radio	Ukilpara, Naogaon	99.2
Radio Naf	Teknaf, Cox's Bazar	99.2
Radio Saikat	Kolatoli, Sadur, Cox's Bazar	99.0
Radio Nalta	Nalta Community Hospital in Satkhira	99.2
Lokobetar	Barguna Sadar Upazila	99.2
Radio Padma	Rajshahi	99.2
Pollikontho	Moulivi Bazer	99.2
Radio Mahananda	Chapai Nababgonj	98.8
Krishi Radio	Amtoli, Barguna District	98.8
Radio Sagor Dwip	DUS Hatiya Island - Noakhali District	99.2
Sagor Giri	Sitakunda, Chittagong	99.2
Sarabela	Radhakrishnapur College Road, Gaibandha	98.8
Radio Boral	Bagha, Rajshahi	99.0
Radio Sundarban	Dakop Upazila - Khulna District	98.8

== See also ==
- List of television stations in Bangladesh
- Media of Bangladesh
- Telecommunications in Bangladesh
