= Edge =

Edge or EDGE may refer to:

== Technology ==
=== Computing ===
- Adobe Edge, a graphical development application
- Microsoft Edge, a web browser developed by Microsoft
- Microsoft Edge Legacy, a discontinued web browser developed by Microsoft
- EdgeHTML, the layout engine used in Microsoft Edge Legacy
- ThinkPad Edge, a Lenovo laptop computer series marketed from 2010
- Explicit data graph execution, a computer instruction set architecture

=== Telecommunication(s) ===
- EDGE (telecommunication), a 2G digital cellular communications technology
- Edge Wireless, an American mobile phone provider
- Motorola Edge series, a series of smartphones made by Motorola
- Samsung Galaxy Note Edge, a phablet made by Samsung
- Samsung Galaxy S7 Edge or Samsung Galaxy S6 Edge, smartphones made by Samsung
- Ubuntu Edge, a prototype smartphone made by Canonical

== Entertainment ==
=== Music ===
- Edge (album), a 1988 album by Daryl Braithwaite
- "Edge", the B-side of the 2008 single "Love the World" by Perfume
- "Edge", a 2013 song by Haim from Days Are Gone

=== Television shows ===
- Edge (TV pilot), a 2015 television pilot

=== Video games ===
- Edge (magazine), a UK video games magazine
- Edge (video game), a 2008 video game by Mobigame
- Edge Games, an American video game company
- Edge (Final Fantasy), a character from the game Final Fantasy IV
- Edge (Rival Schools), a character from the game Rival Schools
- Edge (Suikoden), a character from the game Suikoden III

== Mass media ==
=== Radio stations ===
- 93.7 Edge FM, in Bega, New South Wales
- Edge FM 102.1, in Wangaratta, Victoria
- Edge FM 102.5, in Deniliquin, New South Wales
- Edge Radio, in Hobart, Tasmania
- Radio Edge, a defunct Bangladeshi radio station

=== Other ===
- Edge TV, a Canadian cable music channel
- Edge Media Television, parent company of Irish media company Controversial TV

== Organizations ==
=== Foundations ===
- Edge (educational foundation), an organization in the United Kingdom
- EDGE Foundation, an organization helping female students pursue graduate studies in mathematics
- Edge.org, legally named Edge Foundation, Inc., a science and technology think tank

=== Other organizations ===
- Edge Church, an assemblies of God megachurch in Adelaide, South Australia
- Edge Group, a defence industry conglomerate based in the United Arab Emirates

== People ==
=== Surname ===
- Edge (surname)

=== Other ===
- Morgan Edge, a DC Comics supervillain
- Edge (wrestler) (born 1973), ring name of Canadian professional wrestler Adam Copeland
- Edgerrin James (born 1978), nicknamed "Edge", American football player
- The Edge (born 1961), British-Irish musician, singer, and songwriter with the rock band U2

== Places ==
- Edge, Cheshire, a former civil parish
- Edge, Gloucestershire, a village north of Stroud
- Edge, Shropshire, a hamlet near Yockleton
- Edge, Texas, a community in the United States
- Edge House, a historic home in Groveland, Florida, U.S.

== Sports ==
- Edge (cricket), a term used in cricket
- Edge rusher, either a defensive end or outside linebacker, positions in American football
- St. John's Edge, a Canadian basketball team
- West Michigan Edge, an American soccer team

== Other ==
- Edge (geometry), a one-dimensional line segment joining two vertices
- Edge (graph theory), a pair of vertices that are adjacent in a graph
- Edge (shaving gel), a brand of shaving gel
- Edge Act, U.S. banking legislation
- Edge baronets, title in the Baronetage of the United Kingdom
- EDGE species, evolutionarily distinct and globally endangered species
- Ford Edge, a midsize crossover SUV
- Image edge, a curve in a digital image at which the image brightness changes sharply
- Leading edge, a line connecting the forward-most points of a wing's profile
- Trailing edge, the rear edge of the wing
- Signal edge, a transition of a digital signal from low to high or high to low
- Zivko Edge 540, an aerobatic aircraft

== See also ==
- The Edge (disambiguation)
- Edging (disambiguation)
- 102.1 The Edge (disambiguation)
- Cutting edge (disambiguation)
- Leading edge (disambiguation)
- On the Edge (disambiguation)
- Over the Edge (disambiguation)
