= Cutting edge =

Cutting edge or The Cutting Edge may refer to:

- The cutting surface of a blade or other cutting tool
- State of the art, the highest level of development, as of a device, technique, or scientific field

== Businesses ==
- Cutting Edge Creations, an American inflatable-structures company
- Cutting Edge Haunted House, a haunted house attraction in Fort Worth, Texas, U.S.

== Film and television ==
- Cutting Edge (TV series), a British documentary series on Channel 4
- The Cutting Edge film franchise of romantic comedies centred on figure skating:
  - The Cutting Edge (1992), starring D. B. Sweeney and Moira Kelly
  - The Cutting Edge: Going for the Gold (2006), starring Christy Carlson Romano and Ross Thomas
  - The Cutting Edge: Chasing the Dream (2008), starring Matt Lanter, Francia Raisa and Christy Carlson Romano
  - The Cutting Edge: Fire and Ice (2010), starring Francia Raisa and Brendan Fehr
- The Cutting Edge: The Magic of Movie Editing, a 2004 documentary film
- I.R.S. Records Presents The Cutting Edge, a 1980s music TV series
- "The Cutting Edge", an interview segment on the live TV show WWE Raw hosted by pro wrestler Edge
  - "Cutting Edge Peep Show" when hosted together by Edge and Christian

== Music ==
- Cutting Edge (band), a jazz-rock band from Norway
- The Cutting Edge (album), a 1974 album by Sonny Rollins
- Cutting Edge (recordings), a series of recordings by Delirious? (recorded as The Cutting Edge Band)
- The Bootleg Series Vol. 12: The Cutting Edge 1965–1966, an album by Bob Dylan
- Cutting Edge (record label), a Japanese record label, part of the Avex Group

== Other uses ==
- Cutting Edge (magazine), an online trade magazine from Belgium
- The Cutting Edge (novel), a novel by Dave Duncan in the Handful of Men series
- The Cutting Edge (sculpture), a sculpture at Sheaf Square in Sheffield, England

== See also ==
- Bleeding edge technology
- Leading edge (disambiguation)
- Bleeding Edge (disambiguation)
- Edge (disambiguation)
