= Pitch angle =

Pitch angle can refer to:

- Pitch angle (engineering), the angle between a bevel gears' element of a pitch cone and its axis
- Pitch angle (particle motion), the angle between a charged particle's velocity vector and the local magnetic field
- Pitch angle (kinematics), the rotation about the transverse axis of a stiff body
  - Pitch angle (aviation), an airplane's rotation about its transverse axis
  - Pitch angle (ship motion), a ship's rotation about its transverse axis
- Pitch angle of a spiral, the angle between a spiral and a circle with the same center

== See also ==
- Euler angles
- Roll (disambiguation)
- Pitch (disambiguation)
- Yaw (disambiguation)
