= Edge Media =

Edge Media may refer to:

- Edge Media Television, parent company of Irish media company Controversial TV
- Edge Media Group, publisher of business and financial publications in Malaysia and Singapore

== See also ==
- Edge (disambiguation)#Entertainment
