= Fight Night Re-Loaded =

- Country of origin: United Kingdom
- Original language: English

Production
- Running time: 30 minutes

Original release
- Network: Loaded TV
- Release: January 2013 – present

Fight Night Re-Loaded is a weekly UK television programme showing recorded highlights of classic UK professional boxing matches from the 1980s & 1990s. The programme was devised by Paul Baxendale-Walker and is partnership with boxing promoter Frank Maloney. The show was launched in December 2012, and is broadcast via the Sky satellite platform Channel 200 and online. Broadcasts are weekly at 11pm on Mondays.
