= Loaded Fight Night =

- Country of origin: United Kingdom
- Original language: English

Production
- Running time: 30 minutes

Original release
- Network: Loaded TV
- Release: December 2012 – present

Loaded Fight Night is a weekly UK television programme showing live and recorded highlights of UK professional boxing matches. The programme was devised by Paul Baxendale-Walker and is partnership with boxing promoter Frank Maloney. The show was launched in December 2012, and is broadcast via the Sky satellite platform Channel 200 and online. Broadcasts are weekly at 11pm on Fridays.
