= EM TV (disambiguation) =

EM TV can refer to:

- EM TV, a commercial television station in Papua New Guinea
- Controversial TV, a former commercial television station in the United Kingdom previously known as Edge Media Television
- Sport1 Medien (formerly EM.TV & Merchandising AG), a German media group.
