= On the Edge =

On the Edge may refer to:

== Books ==
- On the Edge, a play by Guy Hibbert
- On the Edge, a play about Virginia Woolf by Catherine Ann Jones
- On the Edge, novel by Peter Lovesey 1989, filmed as Dead Gorgeous
- On the Edge, novel by Gillian Cross
- On the Edge, novel by Edward St Aubyn
- On the Edge, the first novel in Ilona Andrews' The Edge Series
- On the Edge (Hinton novel), a novel by Nigel Hinton
- On the Edge (Werner novel), the English translation of Am Hang, a 2004 novel by Markus Werner
- On the Edge: The Art of Risking Everything, a nonfiction book by Nate Silver
- On the Edge: Political Cults Right and Left, a nonfiction book by Dennis Tourish and Tim Wohlforth
- On the Edge: The Spectacular Rise and Fall of Commodore, a book by Brian Bagnall about Commodore International

== Film ==
- On the Edge, a 1949 short film by Curtis Harrington
- On the Edge (1986 film), film about the Dipsea Race starring Bruce Dern
- On the Edge (2001 theatrical film), an Irish film directed by John Carney
- On the Edge (2001 TV film), film in three parts, directed by Anne Heche, Mary Stuart Masterson, and Helen Mirren
- On the Edge (2002 film), film starring Fred Williamson
- On the Edge (2006 film) (Hak bak do), Hong Kong film starring Nick Cheung
- On the Edge (2011 film), French film
- On the Edge (2020 film), Russian film directed by Eduard Bordukov
- On the Edge (2022 film), Belgian-French-Spanish thriller film
- On the Edge, a 2022 film by Jen and Sylvia Soska

=== TV ===
- On the Edge (TV series), a 1991 Hong Kong programme with Alan Chui Chung-San
- On the Edge (UK TV series), a 2008 controversial TV program hosted by Theo Chalmers
- On The Edge (Doc Martin TV Film) 25 December 2006

== Music ==
=== Albums ===
- On the Edge (Andy Duguid album)
- On the Edge (The Babys album)
- On the Edge (Iron Fire album)
- On the Edge (Northern Lights album)
- On the Edge (Sea Level album), by Sea Level
- On the Edge, by Jonny Blu
- On the Edge, by Patrick Rondat

=== Songs ===
- "On the Edge", by Tokio Hotel from Scream

== Other ==
- On the Edge (game), a collectible card game
- On the Edge (1963) One of the BBC Radio Ballads about teenagers in Britain
- MX vs. ATV: On the Edge, a PlayStation Portable port of the video game MX vs. ATV Unleashed

== See also ==
- Edge (disambiguation)
- Over the Edge (disambiguation)
- The Edge (disambiguation)
