= 98.4 FM =

FM radio frequency

The following radio stations broadcast on FM frequency 98.4 MHz:

== Bangladesh ==
- Radio Ekattor in Dhaka

== Isle of Man ==
- Energy FM in Ramsey

== Indonesia ==
- Prambors FM in Bandung, West Java
- RRI Pro 2 in Ambon, Maluku Province
- Radio Swara Giri FM in Surabaya, East Java
- MG Radio in Makassar, South Sulawesi
- Khana Radio in Banjarmasin, South Kalimantan
- Batara FM in Bandar Lampung, Lampung Province

== Kenya ==
- 98.4 Capital FM in Mombasa and Nairobi

== Malaysia ==
- Melody in Johor Bahru, Johor and Singapore
- TraXX FM in Gerik, Perak

== New Zealand ==
- The Sound in Nelson

== Vietnam ==
- Bac Ninh 98.4 FM in Bac Ninh Province
- Dong Thap FM 98.4 in Đồng Tháp Province

== Zimbabwe ==
- 98.4 Midlands in Gweru
