= Dhoni (disambiguation) =

MS Dhoni (Mahendra Singh Dhoni, born 1981) is an India cricketer.

Dhoni may also refer to:

== Related to MS Dhoni ==
- Dhoni (film), a 2012 Indian film
- M.S. Dhoni: The Untold Story, a 2016 Indian biographical film about the cricketer
  - M.S. Dhoni: The Untold Story (soundtrack)

== Other uses ==
- Dhoni (fishing vessel), traditional sailing boat found in the Maldives, South India and Sri Lanka
- Dhoni, Palakkad, a village in India
- Radio Dhoni, a Bangladeshi FM radio station

== See also ==
- Roar of the Lion, a 2019 Indian English-language documentary TV series starring MS Dhoni
- Seven (brand), an Indian lifestyle brand launched by MS Dhoni
