= The Edge (disambiguation) =

The Edge is a member of the Irish rock band U2.

The Edge may also refer to:

== Film ==
- The Edge (1968 film), a film by Robert Kramer
- The Edge (1989 film), a television movie starring Rutger Hauer
- The Edge (1997 film), a survival adventure drama starring Anthony Hopkins and Alec Baldwin
- The Edge (2010 film), a Russian drama by Alexei Uchitel

== Television ==
- The Edge TV, a New Zealand music television channel
- The Edge (TV series), a 1992–1993 American television sketch-comedy series
- The Edge (game show), a 2015 British quiz show
- "The Edge" (Cardiac Arrest), a 1994 episode
- "The Edge" (FBI: International), a 2021 episode
- The Edge, a gaming guide show on XLEAGUE.TV
- The Edge, an Alaskan gold mining dredge on the reality TV show Bering Sea Gold

== Literature ==
- The Edge (novel), a 2002 young adult novel by Alan Gibbons
- The Edge Chronicles, a fantasy book series by Paul Stewart and Chris Riddell
- The Edge (book series), a fantasy book series by Ilona Andrews
- The Edge (Malaysia), a weekly financial newspaper in Malaysia
- The Edge (magazine), an entertainment magazine at the University of Southampton
- The Maine Edge, or The Edge, a weekly newspaper published in Bangor, Maine, U.S.
- The Edge, a 2005–2007 student newspaper at Fort Hays State University
- The Edge, a 1988 thriller by Dick Francis

== Music ==
- The Edge Festival, a music festival in Edinburgh, Scotland
- The Edge (club), a defunct nightclub in Coventry, England, originally The Eclipse
- The Edge, an early-1980s British band featuring Gem Archer

=== Albums ===
- The Edge (compilation album), an alternative music compilation, 2010
- The Edge (Ike Turner album), 1980

=== Songs ===
- "The Edge" (song), by Tonight Alive from the soundtrack of The Amazing Spider-Man 2, 2014
- "The Edge", by Blind Guardian from A Twist in the Myth, 2006
- "The Edge", by David McCallum
- "The Edge", by Eiffel 65 from Europop
- "The Edge", by Reks from REBELutionary, 2012

== Places ==
- The Edge (Amsterdam), the Deloitte headquarters in Amsterdam
- The Edge at Avenue North, an apartment complex at Temple University
- The Edge (Beirut), the tallest building in Lebanon
- The Edge, a digital culture centre at the State Library of Queensland
- The Edge, a feature of the Eureka Tower in Melbourne, Australia
- The Edge, a future building at the Eden Project in Cornwall, England
- The Edge (New York), an observation deck in New York City's Hudson Yards development
- The Edge Performing Arts & Convention Centre, in Auckland, New Zealand
- The Edge, a red sandstone escarpment above the village of Alderley Edge, Cheshire, UK

== Radio ==
- KDJE or 100.3 The Edge, in Jacksonville & Little Rock, Arkansas, U.S.
- KKED in Fairbanks, Alaska, branded "The Edge" from 1998 to 2016
- 102.5 The Edge, in Deniliquin, New South Wales, Australia
- CADA, formerly The Edge 96.1, in Sydney, Australia
- L107 or The Edge, in West Central Scotland
- WEDG or 103.3 The Edge, in Buffalo, New York, U.S.
- The Edge (New Zealand radio station), on various frequencies
- WNLV in Charlotte, North Carolina, U.S. (formerly 95.1 The Edge)
- 102.1 The Edge (disambiguation):
  - CFNY-FM (branded as 102.1 The Edge) in Toronto, Canada
  - Edge FM 102.1 in Wangaratta, Victoria, Australia
  - KDGE (branded as Star 102.1) in Dallas, Texas, U.S. (formerly 102.1 The Edge)
- Edge Radio, 99.3 FM, Hobart, Australia

== Video games ==
- Edge Games, a video game developer (formerly The Edge)

== See also ==
- Edge (disambiguation)
- On the Edge (disambiguation)
- Over the Edge (disambiguation)
