= Over the Edge =

Over the Edge may refer to:

== Film and television ==
- Over the Edge (film), a 1979 drama starring Matt Dillon
- Over the Edge: In Your House, 1998 professional wrestling pay-per-view
- Over the Edge (1999), a professional wrestling pay-per-view event
- WWF Over the Edge, a professional wrestling pay-per-view event series
- "Over the Edge" (The New Batman Adventures), a 1998 television episode
- "Over the Edge" (A Remarkable Place to Die), a 2024 television episode

== Books and literature ==
- Over the Edge (anthology), edited by August Derleth
- Over the Edge (book), a 2002 nonfiction book by Greg Child
- Over the Edge (Jonathan Kellerman novel)
- Over the Edge, a 1995-96 Marvel comic book series

== Music ==
- Over the Edge (Hurricane album), 1988
- Over the Edge (Mickey Thomas album), 2004
- Over the Edge (Wipers album), 1983
- "Over the Edge" (Sarah Jarosz song), 2013
- "Over the Edge" (Kayzo and Gammer song), 2017
- "Over the Edge", a song by Fu Manchu from the 2000 album King of the Road
- "Over the Edge", a song by L.A. Guns from the 1991 album Hollywood Vampires
- "Over the Edge", a song by Status Quo from their 1980 album Just Supposin'
- "Over the Edge", a song by The Almighty from their 1993 album Powertrippin'

== Other uses ==
- Over the Edge (game), a role-playing game
- Over the Edge (radio program), a radio program created by Don Joyce
- Over the Edge (Zimbabwe), a Zimbabwean theatre company

== See also ==
- Over the Hedge (disambiguation), a comic strip and related media
- On the Edge (disambiguation)
- Edge (disambiguation)
- OTE (disambiguation)
- The Edge (disambiguation)
