= The Pitch =

The Pitch may refer to:

== Television ==
- The Pitch (TV programme), a British talent competition show that debuted in 2012
- The Pitch (TV series), a 2012–2013 American unscripted series
- "The Pitch" (Schitt's Creek), a 2020 episode
- "The Pitch" (Seinfeld), a 1992 episode
- "The Pitch", a segment on the Australian program Gruen

== Other uses ==
- The Pitch (film), a 2025 documentary film directed by Michèle Hozer
- The Pitch (newspaper), an alternative newspaper in Kansas City, Missouri, U.S.
- The Pitch (podcast), an American podcast that debuted in 2015

== See also ==
- Pitch (disambiguation)
