= Off the Bar =

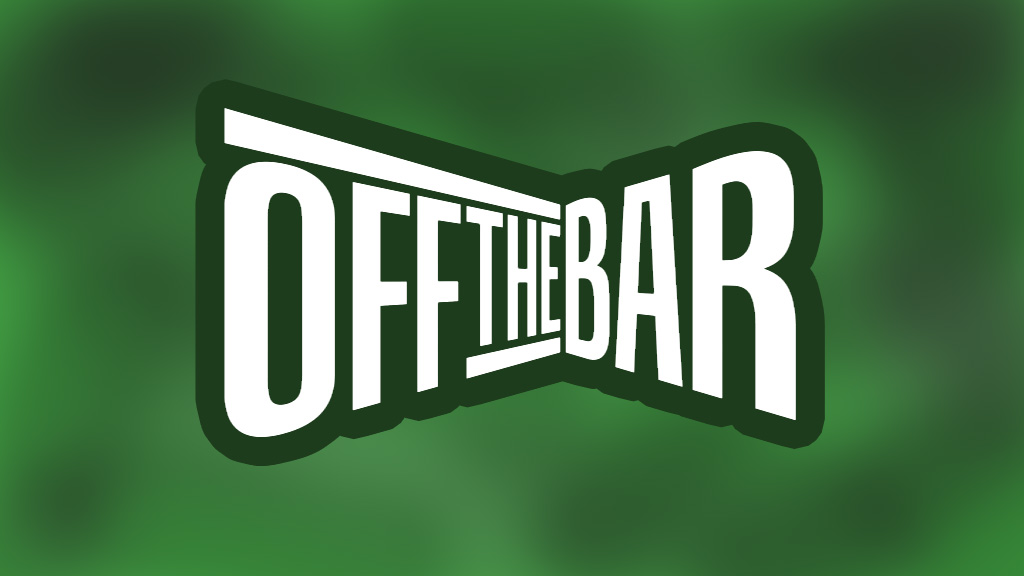

Off the Bar is a British television comedy/sports talk on the Loaded TV network.

== The show ==
Off the bar is a British football talk show, set in a British style pub, on Loaded TV (Sky channel 200). It is hosted by Matt Lorenzo, with Tony Gale, Alan Bentley and Ann Marie Davies and other celebrity guests. Airs on a Friday nights at 9pm.
