= Plastic carbonization =

Technology that converts waste plastic into carbon materials

The behavior of organic matter in response to heat and carbonization

Plastic carbonization is a technology that converts plastic waste into valuable carbon materials through thermal decomposition in a low-oxygen environment. The process may involve heating, pressurization, and chemical treatment, producing carbon residue and gaseous by-products.

== Overview ==
=== Carbonization process ===
Generally, the carbonization process is described in three overlapping stages as the temperature increases. The boundaries between the stages are defined by temperature, but the exact values of these temperatures depend on the characteristics of the raw materials and other conditions beyond temperature. The detailed mechanisms of such carbonization reactions were studied in the 1960s.

=== Carbonization under pressure conditions ===
Pressure conditions are essential in plastic carbonization. When carbonization of low-density polyethylene is carried out at atmospheric pressure, little carbonized material is obtained, but direct pressurized carbonization in a closed system yields a residue with a 45% carbon yield.

==== Direct pressurized carbonization ====
When carbonization material is heated in a pressure-resistant sealed container such as an autoclave, the internal pressure gradually increases as gas molecules are released due to the thermal decomposition of the material. The material is then heated and carbonized while maintaining the pressurized condition. In one study, at high pressures of 300 bar (30 MPA) or higher (without a catalyst), mixing plastic with hydrocarbon components and functional components in the appropriate ratio led to the formation of fine spherical carbon residue particles. Here, the hydrocarbon component is a hydrocarbon plastic consisting only of carbon and hydrogen, and the functional component is a heteroatom-containing plastic that includes atoms other than carbon (heteroatoms: oxygen, nitrogen, chlorine, etc.). For example, when 50% by weight PET (functional component) was added to polyethylene (hydrocarbon component), it was effective in forming spherical carbon particles. Examples of hydrocarbon plastics, such as polyethylene and polystyrene, have also been carbonized under pressure without a catalyst.

For heteroatom-containing plastics, oxygen-free conditions are generally used. Inert gases such as nitrogen or argon are introduced into a tubular furnace for carbonization. By varying the temperature, the characteristics of the resulting carbonized material, such as the carbon form, composition, and surface chemical functional groups, can be controlled. For instance, carbonized material obtained at temperatures around 500 °C retains a relatively high number of surface groups, making it potentially suitable as an adsorbent for pollutants. In contrast, at temperatures exceeding 700 °C, the oxygen-containing functional groups of the carbonized material decrease, and its porosity and conductivity improve.

==== Hydrothermal carbonization ====
Hydrothermal carbonization (HTC) is a type of pressurized carbonization in which heating is performed with water, and pressure is applied with steam. Hydrothermal technology refers to techniques that apply physical and chemical reactions involving high-temperature, high-pressure water or aqueous solutions, and is generally classified into the following three types based on the operational temperature range:

- Hydrothermal Carbonization (HTC) is typically carried out at relatively low to medium pressures of 180–250 °C and 10–40 bar. It often takes several hours to complete, with carbonized products being the main product formed.
- Hydrothermal Liquefaction (HTL) is usually conducted at high pressures of 250–500 °C and 50–200 bar or more. It takes a few minutes to a few hours, and when using biomass as raw material, liquid bio-oil is the main product.
- Hydrothermal Gasification (HTG) is typically performed at high pressures of 500–800 °C and 50–200 bar or more. It only takes a few minutes to complete, with synthetic gas (syngas) being the primary product.

Hydrothermal carbonization is further divided into low-temperature and high-temperature carbonization based on the operational temperature, with 250 °C as the dividing line. In low-temperature hydrothermal carbonization, carbonized material with hydrogen atoms remaining (hydrocar) is produced. As the reaction temperature increases in high-temperature hydrothermal carbonization, products such as graphite, activated carbon, and carbon nanotubes, which are high-purity carbonized materials, are generated. Low-temperature hydrothermal carbonization can be used for the dehydrochlorination treatment of polyvinyl chloride (PVC), which is important for the subsequent formation of aromatic structures in the carbonized products.

Hydrothermal carbonization can be applied to plastics and also to urban waste, including food and paper.

=== Improving carbonization efficiency through pretreatment ===
To obtain quality carbonized products from plastics, the formation of high-order cross-linked structures between plastic polymer chains in the intermediate products during heating is essential. Otherwise, the carbon-carbon chains of the polymers will independently break, leading to the formation and volatilization of low-molecular hydrocarbons (such as propylene, methane, benzene), and only a small amount of carbon residue will be obtained. This is particularly notable in hydrocarbon plastics made of only carbon and hydrogen, such as polyethylene, polypropylene, and polystyrene, which have very low carbonization residue yields unless modified.

Methods of oxidation and chemical modification include heating the polymer chains in an oxygen atmosphere using a catalyst during the pre-carbonization stage, which oxidizes some (but not all) of the carbon atoms in the polymer chains or using sulfuric acid to introduce sulfonic acid groups.

=== Carbonization catalysts and additives ===
When plastics are thermally decomposed in the presence of a catalyst, the reaction efficiency improves, enabling carbonization at lower temperatures and the production of high-purity carbon nanomaterials. Catalysts often play a dual role: initially promoting polymer decomposition and later catalyzing the formation of carbon materials.

Common catalysts include zeolites and metal oxides (such as iron oxide, nickel oxide, titanium oxide, etc.). For example, zeolites provide an acidic reaction environment that promotes the cleavage of plastic polymer bonds and aromatization. Transition metal catalysts such as nickel and iron promote dehydrogenation reactions and induce the growth of carbon nanotubes (CNTs) and graphene. The use of a binary catalyst, such as iron/alumina, has been reported to efficiently generate CNTs from polyethylene thermal decomposition. Calcium oxide can be used as an additive in polyvinyl chloride (PVC) carbonization treatments to absorb and recover harmful hydrogen chloride gas from PVC as calcium chloride.

=== Microwave heating ===
Microwave heating, commonly known from household microwave ovens, can also be applied to the thermal decomposition and carbonization of organic materials, contributing to effective plastic waste utilization and reducing environmental impact. Microwave heating of plastics for carbonization is a process that achieves efficient decomposition and carbonization through selective heating (dielectric heating) using electromagnetic waves, with the theoretical basis being the absorption of microwave energy and the dielectric properties of the material, similar to how a microwave oven works. Commonly used microwave frequencies are 915 MHz and 2,450 MHz (the same as in household microwave ovens).

Plastics themselves generally do not absorb microwaves well, but additives (such as metal oxides) can enhance absorption, allowing for rapid temperature increases. For example, by using an inexpensive iron-based catalyst as a microwave sensor, commercially available ground plastics can be decomposed in just 30–90 seconds, with a high yield of hydrogen gas (55.6 millimoles or 0.112 grams per gram) and multi-layer carbon nanotube carbon residues obtained.

=== Flash Joule Heating ===
Developed in 2020, Flash Joule Heating is a rapid and efficient carbonization method that can convert carbon sources, such as coal, petroleum coke, biochar, carbon black, food waste, rubber tires, and mixed plastic waste, into quality graphene on a gram-scale by subjecting them to Joule heating (temperature > 2,427 °C) for a short time (about 100 milliseconds). This process does not require high-temperature furnaces, solvents, or reactive gases. When carbon-rich raw materials such as carbon black, smokeless coal, or calcined coke (though not plastic) are used, the yield of graphene ranges from 80–90%, with its carbon purity exceeding 99% without the need for further purification. The electrical energy used during this process is as low as approximately 7.2 kilojoules per gram.

As a development of this technology, a method was also developed in 2023 to recover hydrogen atoms generated as byproducts during the graphene conversion of plastics, capturing them as hydrogen gas. Unlike conventional hydrogen production methods such as steam methane reforming, this procedure does not produce carbon dioxide or carbon monoxide. It can generate hydrogen gas with a purity of up to 94% at a high mass yield. Even when selling graphene product at just 5% of the 2023 market price, the cost of hydrogen gas production may be recovered, with a life cycle assessment showing that carbon dioxide emissions are reduced by 39–84% compared to other hydrogen production methods.

=== Gasification ===
Though not a form of carbonization, plastic thermal decomposition can generate gaseous substances, which can then be used as an energy recovery method. The recovery of hydrogen gas, as mentioned in the Flash Joule Heating section, is one such example. While not involving plastics, hydrothermal gasification of biomass is suitable for hydrogen production, with a maximum hydrogen yield of 45 grams per kilogram of biomass.

== Types of plastics and carbonization behaviour ==
Organic molecules composed solely of carbon and hydrogen are typically less reactive and, without forming cross-linked structures between the polymer chains, tend to break down into low-molecular-weight compounds during carbonization. In contrast, when heteroatoms like oxygen are substituted into the polymer chains, the bonds between carbon atoms and these heteroatoms can serve as a foundation for forming cross-linked structures. These cross-linking structures play a critical role in preventing the polymer chains from breaking down into small molecules during thermal decomposition, which is result in carbonization residue.

=== Hydrocarbon plastics ===
For hydrocarbon plastics such as polyethylene and polystyrene, as mentioned above, direct thermal decomposition results in the fragmentation and vaporization of small molecular hydrocarbons, with little carbonization residue obtained.

==== Oxygen treatment ====
Carbonization of hydrocarbon plastics is typically achieved under oxygen-free conditions. However, the hydrocarbon plastics may be partially oxidized. As a result, the oxidized parts of the polymer chains act as reaction centers for cross-linking with adjacent polymer regions (intermolecular or intramolecular), thus suppressing the fragmentation of the polymer into small molecular hydrocarbons and promoting carbonization. For example, when polyethylene sheets are first treated in a convection oven at 270 °C for 4 hours or 330 °C for 10 minutes, many oxygen atoms are introduced into the polyethylene polymer chains, and cross-linking between polymer chains is observed. When further heated to 1,200 °C, graphite carbon residues are obtained with a carbon yield of 50% (for the 330 °C, 10 minute pretreatment). When using common plastic waste materials as raw materials, the carbon residue recovery rate increases slightly. For example, using materials like stretch film and polyethylene gloves results in carbon residue recovery rates of 57% and 51%, respectively, suggesting that impurities and additives commonly found in actual polyethylene products may promote carbonization.

==== Chemical treatment ====
Carbohydrates like sucrose undergo dehydration carbonization when treated with concentrated sulfuric acid. Similarly, even hydrocarbons that cannot undergo dehydration carbonization can undergo "stabilization" treatment for carbonization by sulfonating their polymer chains. While this may lead to the generation of sulfur oxide byproducts, this process can be applied as a stabilization treatment. This is similar to the sulfonation of polyethylene fibers developed in the 1970s, followed by heat carbonization in an inert atmosphere to produce carbon fibers. Detailed studies on the reaction mechanisms for polyethylene show that at temperatures of 150–200 °C, the polymer undergoes a cross-linking phase, and gas analysis confirms the simultaneous release of sulfur dioxide and water molecules. Above 600 °C, hydrogen gas is released and removed, resulting in graphene-like carbon nanostructures. In one study, discarded polystyrene waste materials from disposable cutlery, cups, plates, and dairy containers were shredded and stirred, with concentrated sulfuric acid dripped onto the polystyrene at its melting point of 240 °C for stabilization. Then, a slow heating process at 10 °C per minute was used for pyrolytic carbonization, resulting in activated carbon capable of removing heavy metals like nickel.

=== Polyethylene terephthalate (PET) ===
Polyethylene terephthalate (PET) is an ester copolymer made from terephthalic acid and ethylene glycol. Due to its rich chemical reactivity, such as ester hydrolysis, it is a heteroatom-containing plastic that is most easily subjected to chemical recycling. PET contains oxygen atoms in the form of aromatic esters, which act as starting points for the formation of cross-linked structures, allowing for carbonization without the need for a "stabilization" pretreatment, which is required for hydrocarbon plastics. PET has been mixed with hydrocarbon plastics for carbonization, and the mixture was carbonized without the need for stabilization pretreatment.

PET is one of the most commonly used disposable plastics, with studies regarding its carbonization and recycling. However, the focus of these studies has been on structural and functional analysis of the carbonization products and exploring their uses, rather than on efficiently recovering carbon from waste PET. The reported carbon recovery rates are about 20% with direct carbonization at high temperatures, about 25% with carbonization in molten salts, and about 32% with the use of potassium hydroxide (an ester hydrolysis agent).

=== Polyvinyl chloride (PVC) ===
Polyvinyl chloride (PVC) and other heteroatom-containing plastics that contain chlorine have a lower carbon content because chlorine atoms are heavier (with an atomic weight of 35.5, about three times that of carbon, which has an atomic weight of 12.0). The theoretical carbon recovery from PVC is low. Chlorine atoms in PVC release hydrogen chloride, which can corrode the carbonization furnace and pollute the atmosphere if released into the air. Once chlorine is removed, the polymer chain's carbon atoms contain polyene structures that could serve as starting points for cross-linking, enabling carbonization. However, at relatively low temperatures of 220–230 °C, the removal of hydrogen chloride occurs simultaneously, and about 15% of the intermediate polyene carbons produced during the process are lost into volatile small molecules such as benzene. This suggests that the polyene structure not only forms cross-links between polymer chains but can also cause benzene rings to form and be liberated within the molecule. Therefore, in PVC carbonization, it is desirable to remove chlorine before carbonization through pretreatment at low temperatures that prevent the formation of benzene, and to stabilize the generated polyene structure through oxygen treatment.

One example of a two-step pretreatment involving hydrogen chloride removal and oxygen treatment allows for the production of carbon fibers from PVC. When PVC was treated for 2 hours at 260 °C under an inert atmosphere, hydrogen chloride was removed, and the weight decreased by 52%. Next, the temperature was rapidly raised to 360–410 °C, and after heating for 1–2 hours, the weight loss was only 6%. The total weight loss of 58% closely matched the theoretical amount of hydrogen chloride released from PVC (59% by weight), indicating that chlorine was almost completely recovered. The resulting "PVC pitch" residue was then spun into fibers and oxidized (stabilized) in air at 320 °C, resulting in an 8% increase in weight due to oxygen absorption. Finally, the fibers were carbonized at 550 °C under an inert atmosphere, and the carbon yield from the carbon fibers was about 80% of the PVC pitch, with 52% of the carbon content originally present in the PVC being recovered.

=== Polyurethane (PU) ===
Polyurethane (PU) is a heteroatom-containing plastic with high oxygen and nitrogen content, making it an ideal raw material for the production of porous carbon materials. However, unlike the specific monomer structure of PET, PU is a general term for plastics made from a variety of monomers containing carbamate structures. Therefore, the thermal behavior of PU varies depending on the monomer structure, and there is no universal carbonization condition that applies to all PUs. The success of carbonization can vary depending on the specific structure of the raw PU. PU is typically synthesized through the copolymerization of a Diisocyanates and a polyol. For instance, if the polyol contains an ethylene glycol structure, the PU may lose ethylene glycol molecules upon heating, similar to PET, resulting in lower carbonization yields. Due to these circumstances, most studies on PU carbonization, similar to those of PET, focus on the structural and functional analysis of the carbonization products and exploring their potential uses, rather than achieving high carbon recovery rates.

In one study, PU (with an unspecified structure) was heated alone and completely vaporized between 500–660K (227–387 °C), resulting in zero residual weight. However, when PU was pretreated with a potassium carbonate aqueous solution, about 50% of the weight was lost by around 640K (367 °C). After that, the weight remained constant to around 1000K (727 °C), achieving stabilization. Nevertheless, when carbonized at 773 or 873K (500 or 600 °C), the carbonization recovery rate was approximately 12%.

=== Mixed plastics ===
Although not carbonization, catalytic pyrolysis of a mixture of plastics consisting of 40% polyethylene, 35% polypropylene, 18% polystyrene, 4% polyethylene terephthalate, and 3% polyvinyl chloride, simulating real-world plastic waste, resulted in the production of low-molecular hydrocarbons (such as toluene, ethylbenzene, styrene) derived from cleaved polymer chains.

There has been a report on the large-scale production of porous carbon nanosheets through the carbonization of a variety of plastic waste mixtures such as used cloth bags, used containers, used foam sheets, used beverage bottles, and used sewer pipes. The generation of high-performance carbon materials from plastic waste derived from electronic waste has been reported, with activated carbon generated from waste printer plastics showing promise as a high-capacity cathode material for sodium-ion batteries. A comparison of the arsenic adsorption effects of low-cost carbon synthesized from the carbonization of waste polyvinyl chloride, polyethylene terephthalate, and polyethylene, found that the mixed carbon from polyethylene and polyvinyl chloride had the highest arsenic removal rate, ranging from 72% to 99%.

== Applications ==
The carbon residue remaining after treatment has uses as carbon materials. Carbon materials with high electrical conductivity can be generated and used as electrodes in lithium-ion batteries and supercapacitors.

=== Activated carbon ===
Activated carbon made from plastic waste is expected to have applications in water purification, air purification, and soil improvement, and has already been commercialized in products such as air conditioner filters and insulation wall sheets. Numerous combinations of carbonization methods and activation treatments have been developed for obtaining activated carbon from plastic waste.

In chemical activation, pores can be developed at temperatures between 400–700 °C, but removal of the activating agent is necessary. In physical activation, after carbonization, the carbonization products are treated with steam, carbon dioxide, or nitrogen at high temperatures between 800–1000 °C. Although no activating agents are used and thus no cleaning treatment is required, physical activation consumes more energy and takes longer, and the resulting activated carbon tends to have a lower adsorption capacity.

=== Electrode materials ===
Carbon-based nanomaterials are the most commonly used electrode materials in electrochemical capacitors due to their high porosity, large surface area, and high electrical conductivity. Carbonization products derived from plastics can be used in energy storage devices such as lithium-ion batteries and supercapacitors. By using plastic waste in the manufacturing of lithium-ion batteries, costs can be reduced, which could expand their use in electrified public transportation and electric vehicles. Activated carbon, carbon nanotubes, and graphene can all be used as carbon-based electrode materials, and the raw materials can range from polyethylene, PET, polystyrene, polyvinyl chloride to mixed plastics. It has been reported that there is not much correlation between the capacitance and the type of raw plastic used^{Table 8}.

The main focus of research for achieving optimal performance as electrode materials is to optimize the manufacturing process to build high-performance carbon structures for electrode materials, regardless of the type of carbonization raw material used. For example, one study examined the electrochemical properties of activated carbon produced from biomass using chemical activation and its relationship with the type of activating agent used and activation conditions. It was found that when phosphoric acid was used as the chemical activating agent, phosphorus atoms were incorporated into the carbon skeleton of the carbonization product. As a result, active sites for ion adsorption (i.e., the amount of ions adsorbed from the electrolyte) increased, and even though the textural properties were inferior, high rate performance could still be achieved.

=== Carbon fibers ===
Carbon fibers are lightweight, high-strength materials used in aerospace and automotive industries. For many years, polyacrylonitrile (PAN)-based plastics and pitch-based materials have been used as raw materials for carbon fibers. However, the method of producing carbon fibers by sulfonating polyethylene (PE) fibers, followed by thermal carbonization in an inert atmosphere, has been known since the 1970s, and much research has been conducted on this technology. Unlike PAN, which is spun from a solution, PE is thermoplastic, and its precursor fibers are spun through melting. Therefore, it cannot be directly carbonized by heat, and stabilization through sulfonation treatment is necessary. Nonetheless, the production cost can be reduced by 51% compared to PAN^{Figure 35}.

The remaining challenges for PE-based carbon fibers are the improvement of the sulfonation process and the enhancement of the mechanical properties of the carbon fiber products. A "hydrostatic sulfonation method" has been developed for the former, where sulfonation is performed at 5 bar pressure for 2.5 hours at 130 °C, followed by carbonization at a heating rate of 5 °C per minute for 5 minutes at 1000 °C. This process yields carbon fibers with a tensile strength of 2.03 GPA, a tensile modulus of 143.6 GPA, and a breaking elongation of 1.4%.

=== Biochar mimetics ===
While it is difficult, as of 2023, to produce carbonized materials equivalent to natural biochar from plastics alone, research is ongoing into methods such as co-pyrolyzing PET or polystyrene with Corn Stover, which can create artificial biochar with properties similar to biochar through carbonization with biomass. Food waste, which contains nitrogen, could lead to the production of toxic cyanides when co-carbonized with contaminated plastics, but studies have shown that co-carbonizing with appropriate amounts of discarded polyvinyl chloride, for example, can produce 'artificial biochar' without generating cyanides.

=== Gas by-products ===
During the carbonization of plastics, gaseous by-products such as methane, hydrogen, carbon monoxide, carbon dioxide, and low molecular hydrocarbons (ethylene, propylene, benzene, etc.) are inevitably produced along with the carbonized product. A mixture of carbon monoxide and hydrogen (syngas) can be used as an energy source in the carbonization process, aiming for carbon neutrality. Hydrogen can be separated and purified for use as a hydrogen source for fuel cells. It is also possible to improve hydrogen yield through the optimization of the carbonization process.

== Limitations ==
Improving carbon recovery rates is crucial for achieving large-scale production of carbonized materials. In particular, this would include a universal and low-cost method for carbonizing hydrocarbon plastics.

Depending on the type of plastic, harmful volatile components may be generated, although not as much as during incineration. Plastics containing chlorine, such as polyvinyl chloride, especially pose a risk of hydrogen chloride contamination when carbonized directly. Therefore, appropriate pretreatment and gas treatment technologies should be employed.

== See also ==
- Plastic pollution
- Marine plastic pollution
- plastic recycling
- Waste management
- Biochar
- Carbonization
- Torrefaction
- Climate change mitigation
