= Pitch-based carbon fiber =

Carbon fiber is often time produced using two main methods: through the use of Polyacrylonitrile (PAN) and from mesophase pitch.

The mesophase pitch forms a thermotropic crystal, which allows the pitch to become organized and form linear chains without the use of tension. Mesophase pitch is made by polymerizing isotropic pitch to a higher molecular weight. The melting point for the mesophase pitch is roughly 300 °C. An advantage in the production of Pitch carbon fibers over PAN carbon fibers is that Pitch carbon fibers do not require constant tension on the fibers at all processing stages. Pitch based carbon fibers have been found to be more sheet-like in their crystal structure, as opposed to PAN based carbon fibers, which are more granular.

There are four main steps in the production of carbon fiber from pitch 1) melt spinning 2) oxidization/precarbonization 3) carbonization and 4) graphitization.

1) Melt spinning is the method of forming fibers through the rapid cooling of a melt; due to the fast rates of cooling, the mesophase pitch is able to become highly oriented. Mesophase pitch can be melt spun, but because of its flow characteristics the process can be difficult. The viscosity of mesophase pitch is more sensitive to temperature than other melt-spun materials. Therefore, during the creation of pitch based fibers the temperature and heat transfer rate must be carefully controlled.

2) Oxidization/Precarbonization is used in order to cross-link the fibers to the point where they cannot be melted or fused together. This step is extremely important because it produces fibers that are stable at the high temperatures of carbonization and graphitization; otherwise, the fibers would fail in those steps of the process. It has been reported that the cross-linking is mainly ether formed from C=O or COH.

3) Carbonization is the process removing all non organic elements. In the case of carbon fibers, all elements except for carbon are removed. This is achieved by heating the fibers to high temperatures in an environment without oxygen. This step removes all impurities from the fibers and leaves crystalline carbon structures. These structures are mostly hexagonal in shape and are composed of entirely carbon.

4) Graphitization is the process of treating the fibers at high temperatures in order to improve the alignment and orientation of the crystalline regions along the fiber direction [1,8]. Having the crystalline regions aligned, stacked, and oriented along the fiber direction increases the overall strength of the carbon fiber.

The high strength of carbon fiber can be attributed to these four main processes. Having high levels of crystalline regions allows the fibers to withstand high levels of stress. These crystalline regions are formed via the melt spinning process; the crystals are stiff areas that do not deform when an external stress is applied. Orienting and aligning these crystalline regions gives further strength to the fibers, specifically if the orientation is along the fiber axis. Carbonization and graphitization are the two processes responsible for this alignment of the crystalline regions. Pitch based carbon fiber is lower in strength than fiberglass; however, it has a very high elastic modulus.

Pitch-based carbon fibers have various end uses due to their high modulus and relatively high strength. These fibers are used within the aerospace industry due to their high modulus, high thermal conductivity, and high electrical conductivity. However, the low production volume of pitch-based carbon fibers, the raw material cost, and the difficulty of production mean that the price is high compared to PAN-based carbon fibers. Pitch-based carbon fibers could be used within the automotive and sports industries, but the higher strength and lower cost of PAN-based carbon fibers makes them more advantageous.
