= Asian TV =

Bangladeshi TV channel

- Country: Bangladesh
- Broadcast area: Nationwide
- Headquarters: Niketan, Dhaka

Programming
- Language: Bengali
- Picture format: 1080i HDTV

Ownership
- Owner: Asian Group of Industries
- Key people: Liaquat Ali Khan Mukul (chairman)

History
- Launched: 18 January 2013; 13 years ago

Links
- Website: www.asiantvonline.com

Asian TV (Bengali: এশিয়ান টিভি) is a Bangladeshi Bengali language satellite and cable mixed entertainment television channel owned by the Asian Group of Industries. It began broadcasts on 18 January 2013, with the "Your Channel" slogan. Asian TV is headquartered in the Niketan area of Gulshan Thana in Dhaka.

== History ==
Asian TV was formed by businessman Harun-ur-Rashid, as part of his Asian Group of Industries, which also includes Asian Radio, Asian Textile, Asian Fabrics, and Asian Yarn Dyeing. The Bangladesh Telecommunication Regulatory Commission granted the channel a license to broadcast in June 2011. The logo of Asian TV was unveiled in an event at the Pan Pacific Sonargaon hotel in Dhaka on 20 June 2012. The event began with the theme song of Asian TV "Elo Praner Protichchhobi" sang by Runa Laila.

It was launched on 18 January 2013, after months of test transmissions. Asian Radio, its radio sister, also began broadcasting the same day. However, the radio station was later shut down. As a result of massive vandalism against eight television channels occurred on 5 August 2024 during anti-government protests in Bangladesh, Asian TV was one of the channels to go off the air temporarily. Despite this, the channel was shown to gain ratings on that day due to the faulty TRP system of Bangladesh Satellite Company Limited at the time. On 26 January 2026, Rupayan Group chairman Liaquat Ali Khan Mukul was elected chairman of Asian TV.

== Programming ==
Asian TV broadcasts a diverse range of programming ever since its launch. Shortly prior to that, its owners announced that its lineup would include dramas, reality series, music shows, talk shows, animated programming, and others. It started broadcasting the Bengali dub of Japanese animated series Doraemon in April 2014. On the occasion of the month of Ramadan, Asian TV was one of the eight television channels to broadcast the cooking series Pran Premium Ghee Star Cook in July 2014. Afsan Chowdhury, advisory editor for the Dhaka Courier, described the channel as politically independent, and wrote that it "markets low end entertainment products".

=== List of programming ===
- Bishakha
- Doraemon
- Lag Bhelki Lag
- Ontohin
- Paramparça (title localized as Ayesha Maryam)

== See also ==
- List of television stations in Bangladesh
