= Leading edge (disambiguation) =

The leading edge is the part of an aerofoil or wing which leads in movement through the air.

Leading edge may also refer to:

== Transportation ==
=== Aviation ===
- Leading edge cuff, a fixed aerodynamic device employed on fixed-wing aircraft to modify the airfoil
- Leading-edge extension, a small extension to an aircraft wing surface, forward of the leading edge
- Leading edge inflatable kite, a single skin kite with inflatable bladders providing structure
- Leading-edge slats, aerodynamic surfaces on the leading edge of the wings of fixed-wing aircraft
- Leading edge slot, aerodynamic features of the wing of some airplanes to reduce the stall speed and promote good low-speed handling qualities
- Leading Edge Air Foils, an American aircraft parts supplier
- Leading Edge Aviation Services, an American aircraft maintenance, repair, and overhaul (MRO) company

=== Automotive ===
- Leading Edge Sports Car Company, a British sports car company in operation from 2002 to 2005 in Norfolk, England

== Computing and electronics ==
- Leading Edge Products, a computer manufacturer in the 1980s and 1990s
  - Leading Edge Model D, an IBM-clone computer released by Leading Edge in about 1986
- Leading Edge Group, an Australian-owned buying group for computers, appliances, electronics, entertainment, books and jewellery
  - Leading Edge Computers, an Australian computer store, part of the above group
- Leading edge, the front part of a digital signal edge

== Publications ==
- Leading Edge (magazine), speculative fiction magazine published at Brigham Young University
- The Leading Edge, a journal of the Society of Exploration Geophysicists

== Other uses ==
- Leading Edge Partnership, programme for secondary schools in England
- Leading edge, in marketing, a metaphor for state of the art, the highest level of development, as of a device, technique, or scientific field
- Leading Edge Brands, soft drink marketing and manufacturing company based in Temple, Texas

== See also ==
- Edge (disambiguation)
- Cutting edge (disambiguation)
- Bleeding Edge (disambiguation)
