= Radio Metrowave =

Dhaka; Bangladesh
- Broadcast area: Dhaka metropolitan area
- Frequency: 1170 kHz

History
- First air date: 26 March 1999; 26 years ago
- Last air date: 27 June 2005

Technical information
- Transmitter coordinates: 23.7800°N 90.3573°E

Radio Metrowave (Bengali: রেডিও মেট্রোওয়েভ) was the first private radio station in Bangladesh. The station carried a news and entertainment format that it characterised as "infotainment". It broadcasts on frequency 256.41-meter band or 1170 kHz in a medium wave, from 7:30 a.m. to 10:30 a.m. and noon to 3:00 p.m. The station served the Dhaka metropolitan area and adjoining districts. It began broadcasting on 26 March 1999.

== Programs ==
Its programs Probhati, Ajker Din, Ganer Pakhi, Metro Hits, Global Rhythm, Rockwave, Nakshi Katha, Metro Sananda, Sonali Otit, and Station Rock were, according to the station, popular.

== Shutdown ==
Radio Metrowave was closed down by the government on 27 June 2005 because of its persistent failure to pay off arrears to state-owned Bangladesh Betar, from which it rented a time slot and transmitter.

== See also ==
- Communications in Bangladesh
- List of Bangladeshi television and radio channels
