= OTE (disambiguation) =

OTE is the national telecommunications provider of Greece.

OTE may also refer to:

- Ocean thermal energy conversion, a renewable energy source
- Oda of Haldensleben (978–1023), daughter of the Margrave of the North March, Theoderich
- On-target earnings, a feature in some job adverts
- Operational test and evaluation (OT&E), as in the U.S. Operational Test and Evaluation Directorate
- Optical Telescope Element, a sub-section of the James Webb Space Telescope
- Ordinary time earnings, the basis used to determine mandatory employer superannuation contributions in Australia
- Overtime Elite, a basketball league based in Atlanta, Georgia, United States

== See also ==
- Ōte, a 1991 Japanese film directed by Junji Sakamoto
- Over the Edge (disambiguation)
