= The Pitch (TV programme) =

UK television talent contest

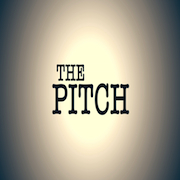
- Country of origin: United Kingdom
- Original language: English

Production
- Running time: 30 minutes

Original release
- Network: Loaded TV
- Release: 30 November 2012 – present

The Pitch is a UK light entertainment talent contest television programme, which airs on a Friday night. The show was launched on 30 November 2012. The basis of the show is for contestants to perform their music/singing/comedy acts in front of a panel of media experts with the potential prize of winning their own television show. The panel consists of Loaded TV owner Paul Baxendale-Walker, 'Jonglers' comedy clubs proprietor Maria Kempinska, broadcaster and sports agent Eric Hall, magazine editor Ian Edmondson, and actress and Creative Director of Brighton Film School Carol Harrison.
