= Loaded (magazine) =

British men's lifestyle magazine, 1994–2015

loaded

- Loaded magazine (January 2003 cover)
- Editor: Danni Levy
- Categories: Men's magazines
- Frequency: Monthly (1994–present)
- Format: Magazine (1994–2015); Website (2015–present)
- Publisher: Loaded Digital Ltd
- Founded: 1994
- Company: Loaded Digital Ltd
- Country: United Kingdom
- Based in: London
- ISSN: 1353-3479

Loaded is a men's lifestyle magazine, now online. It launched as a mass-market print publication in 1994, stopped being issued in March 2015, and relaunched as a digital magazine in November 2015. The content was changed, with risqué material being heavily reduced. It relaunched in May 2024 as a website.

The magazine's title was stylised entirely in lower case letters. The original version of the publication was often termed the epitome of a "lad mag". The magazine was based in London. The brand was taken over by Dubai-based entrepreneur Stewart Lochrie in 2024, alongside new editor Danni Levy, and sub-editor, Darren Croft.

== History ==
=== Development and launch ===
Marketed with the tagline "For men who should know better", Loaded was launched in May 1994. It was originally published by IPC Media who committed to its initial development following a discussion between the company's executives and James Brown during a job interview for the editorship of New Musical Express, also part of the IPC group. In development for a year, Loaded was predicted to be a flop, but IPC considered it a low-risk investment because the advertising department of its Music & Sport division already existed and the promotional budget was minimal. IPC itself had little faith in the magazine; according to Brown the staff were initially only contracted for 3 months after the launch. Taking its title from the Primal Scream song of the same name, the magazine was founded by Mick Bunnage, Tim Southwell and Brown.

As the magazine was part of IPC's Music & Sport division, Loaded was going to be a magazine which combined NME-style music journalism with that of football. Then, when the first issue was about to be signed off, the publication found out that it could not use a feature about Rod Stewart and so the magazine's publisher Alan Lewis suggested that they replace Stewart with photographs of Elizabeth Hurley in her underwear, as well as adding a bit about fashion to help sell advertising space.

Speaking about Loaded's audience in 2001, Brown remarked: "I knew that most of the guys in the country weren't like those other magazines, like GQ and Arena, were telling them they were. They weren't driving around in Range Rovers with very expensive Savile Row suits." He cited the irreverent comic Viz as an inspiration for Loaded, while Holly Baxter has suggested that Playboy was an influence on the title. Brown wrote in the May 1994 launch issue: "Loaded is a new magazine dedicated to life, liberty and the pursuit of sex, drink, football and less serious matters. Loaded is music, film, relationships, humour, travel, sport, hard news and popular culture. Loaded is clubbing, drinking, eating, playing and eating. Loaded is for the man who believes he can do anything, if only he wasn't hungover".

The original editorial team also included Martin Deeson, Jon Wilde, Rowan Chernin, Pete Stanton and Derek Harbinson. The first issue, according to Brown, "featured stories on Eric Cantona, Paul Weller and a travel story about a man whose 'bird' was possibly eaten by a shark" in addition to the photos of a Liz Hurley in her see-through lace underwear" with the cover-stars on the first three issues being Gary Oldman, Leslie Nielsen and Elle Macpherson.

=== 1990s ===
Loaded captured the lad culture of the time. Deeson remarked: "I think we just caught some wave in Nineties, because the Eighties had been fairly miserable. Then we got into the Nineties and things started to loosen up a bit. ... It just seemed like a good time, and we just were part of it and caught that wave." The magazine won the prestigious PPA Magazine of the Year Award two years in succession, in 1995 and 1996.

Brown resigned from his post at Loaded in April 1997 to become editor of GQ. He was quoted as saying at the time: "I won't talk about Laddism and all that bollocks, that shows a lack of understanding of what Loaded is about. I'm not a 25-year-old loafer any more, I'm confronting new things in my life now and GQ will give me much greater scope... It is a natural step on." Staff at Loaded had mixed feelings about Brown considering him to be a bully while more widely he had acquired a reputation for heavy drinking and cocaine use.

Circulation peaked in the second half of 1998 with monthly sales of 457,318, although FHM surpassed competing titles with a 775,000 monthly circulation. At the end of 1999, with circulation in the market sector now beginning to decline, Loaded dropped what was described by Meg Carter in The Independent as its "babe-only cover policy".

Launch Deputy Editor and later Editor, Tim Southwell, wrote about the early years of Loaded in Getting Away With It (Ebury Press, 1998). James Brown discussed the title at length and the impact it had on '90s culture in the documentary Live Forever: The Rise and Fall of Brit Pop.

=== 2000s ===
Loaded had a circulation of 350,000 in 2000. The publication was edited by Martin Daubney from August 2003 to October 2010 with the sales supported by DVD girl themed covermounts and the price being reduced temporarily to £2.50. Daubney resigned when he became a father. Between 2003 and 2006, Loaded won industry awards for design and journalism, including 'best designed fashion pages' at the Magazine Design Awards, for a spread of dogs photographed wearing jewellery. Loaded staff writer Jeff Maysh won five industry awards for journalism, including MJA Feature Writer of the Year, and PTC New Monthly Consumer Journalist of the year.

After the launch by IPC in 2004 of Nuts, announced as the world's first men's weekly, Emap quickly followed with Zoo. Loaded changed its policy of a few years earlier and increased its depiction of female nudity. Standard industry practices for news' vendors were revised in March 2006 after an agreement was reached between the National Federation of Retail Newsagents and the Home Office following concerns that lads' mags were within the reach of children. The result was that Loaded found itself displayed on the top shelf next to copies of Penthouse and other pornographic magazines.

The circulation declined: in the first six months of 2007, Loaded recorded a 35% drop in circulation compared to the first half of 2006. In February 2010, Loaded received an ABC circulation figure that was down "just 2% over the period," compared with what Media Week called "eye-popping falls" for its competitors.

In 2007, Loaded was voted 49th in a poll organised by industry website goodmagazine.com's for the Top 51 Magazines of All Time, for the "Smartest, Prettiest, Coolest, Funniest, Most Influential, Most Necessary, Most Important, Most Essential, etc."

In the May 2008 issue of Loaded, the editorial team had to print an apology to Heinz after claiming in an earlier issue that Heinz had produced a version of alphabetti spaghetti especially for the German market that consisted solely of tiny pasta shaped swastikas.

=== 2010s ===
IPC Media sold Loaded, along with SuperBike, to Vitality Publishing in 2010. Circulation figures had been dropping year on year by 26.3% and had declined to 53,591 at the time of the sale. In the second half of 2011, the last year for which figures were known at the time of the magazine's eventual closure, circulation was 34,505 copies per issue, a decline of 30.2% over the same period in the previous year.

Vitality entered administration in April 2012. That month, Paul Baxendale-Walker purchased Loaded on behalf of Blue Media Publishing Group. Ian Edmondson, a former news editor at the News of the World then on bail, became editor in May replacing Andy Sherwood. Loaded's owners Blue Publishing entered administration in June 2013.

With new editor Jamie Wallis re-positioning the magazine to focus more on fashion, entertainment, music and sport, Loaded was bought by independent publishing house Simian Publishing in September 2013.

=== Print relaunch and closure ===
Loaded relaunched for its twentieth anniversary in 2014 under editor Aaron Tinney. Tinney commissioned self-proclaimed militant feminist Julie Burchill to write a regular 'agony aunt' column and Lia Nicholls as Deputy Editor, making her the first woman with an editorial role at the magazine. The relaunch also saw original Loaded writer Martin Deeson return to the magazine. In an article in The Independent, Deeson was quoted as comparing Tinney to James Brown, the original "iconoclastic" Loaded editor.

The Co-operative chain announced in August 2013 that it would soon only sell magazines like Loaded if they were sealed in a plastic "modesty bag". Unlike some of its rivals, the magazine chose to adopt the practice. The following year, in July, Loaded dropped the photographs of partially clothed women after the lads' mag sector as a whole had faced opposition to their publication and display on covers from other supermarket chains, advertisers and feminist campaigners. When a reporter for the London Evening Standard asked if the policy on female nudity had changed, a spokesman for Simian Publishing commented: "Yes — we're going to be far more discerning and sophisticated from now on,"

The magazine's closure was announced in late March 2015, the last issue being for April of that year. This issue featured Noel Gallagher answering questions written by Irvine Welsh, but conveyed to him by Nicholls.

The Loaded style was copied many times, most obviously in a relaunch of FHM, then owned by Emap, Maxim and more niche titles like Eat Soup and Men's Health. Loaded also influenced women's monthlies, with Emap launching Minx, "For girls with a lust for life". In the opinion of Holly Baxter, Loaded "tried to incorporate interviews and features that would make the publication seem a little less seedy" than Nuts, its more down market rival which closed in 2014.

=== Relaunch online ===
On 11 November 2015, Loaded relaunched online with new owners The Color Company. The Guardian's Mark Sweney wrote at the time of the online relaunch in November 2015 that Loaded had been given: "a new lease of life as a digital publication dropping the scantily-clad girls of its heyday in favour of classier content" intending to become a quality men's magazine. Actor Colin Farrell was among the initial interviewees. Continuing the last version of Loaded in the final eight print issues, editor Aaron Tinney was quoted as saying, "It is quality men's magazine content online. There is a female focus, but not of the sort of Page 3 type stuff."

In May 2024, Danni Levy took over as new editor of the online magazine, and launched a 30th birthday limited edition print version featuring Elizabeth Hurley on the cover.

== Columnists ==
- Morakot Kittisara
- Julie Burchill
- Jack Dee
- Ricky Hatton
- Peter Crouch
- Irvine Welsh
- John Niven
- Donal MacIntyre
- Ben Camara
- Jon Wilde

== Eat Soup ==
Eat Soup magazine was a Loaded spin-off overseen by magazine publisher Alan Lewis (1945–2021) and editor David Lancaster at IPC and was intended as a more of a lifestyle magazine (like GQ) with articles about good food, good living, travel and luxury goods. However, even though the look and tone was in keeping with Loaded, the new bi-monthly magazine was not a success, with the publication being scrapped in 1997 after a year on sale.

== Loaded Lafta Awards (2003 to 2013) ==
See Loaded Lafta Awards

== Legacy ==
In November 2024, the documentary Loaded: Lads, Mags and Mayhem aired on BBC Two, charting the rise and fall of the publication.

== See also ==
- Loaded TV – related satellite TV station
