= Bleeding Edge =

Bleeding Edge may refer to:

- Bleeding edge, used to describe emerging technologies
- Bleeding Edge (novel), by Thomas Pynchon, 2013
- The Bleeding Edge, a 2018 documentary about the medical device industry
- The Bleeding Edge (album), by Parker/Lee/Evans, 2011
- Bleeding Edge (video game), 2020
- Bleeding Edge Armor, fictional armor worn by comic book superhero Iron Man

== See also ==
- Leading edge (disambiguation)
- Cutting edge (disambiguation)
