= Jeff Maysh =

British-American journalist (born 1982)

- Born: 30 March 1982 (age 44); Nassau, Bahamas
- Occupations: Writer; author; journalist
- Maysh's voice recorded January 2017
- Website: www.jeffmaysh.com

Jeff Maysh (born 30 March 1982, Nassau, Bahamas) is a British-American writer, author and journalist based in Hollywood, California, United States.

== Journalism ==
Maysh started his career at the British men's magazine Loaded. He moved to America in 2010 to cover international crime, for publications including The Atlantic magazine.

As a correspondent for the BBC, Maysh became the first journalist to enter the notorious Korydallos prison, near Athens. His profile of prisoner Vassilis Paleokostas, a Greek bank robber who escaped from the prison in a helicopter, twice, was published on the BBC News Magazine on 25 September 2014.

Maysh's story about Steve Davies, a mythical soccer fan who scored a goal for West Ham United, was listed in the notable section of "Best American Sports Writing 2014", and voted number one in a poll of "greatest ever soccer stories".

In May 2015, Paramount Pictures acquired the movie rights to Maysh's story "The Wedding Sting". According to a report in Variety, bidding became "competitive" among Hollywood studios for the true account of a rural Michigan police department that trapped drug dealers with a fake wedding. The story was first published in The Atlantic magazine.

In 2016, Maysh won "Best Crime Reporting" and "Best Feature (over 1,000 words)" at the 58th Annual Southern California Journalism Awards. Both awards recognised his story in Playboy magazine about a Michigan farmer who ran a $4 million smuggling operation involving counterfeit Pez dispensers.

Maysh's 2016 book Handsome Devil is about Victor Lustig, while the following year's The Spy With No Name is about Erwin van Haarlem, a Czechoslovak spy.

In 2018, Maysh published an 8,900-word article about a major fraud involving the McDonald's Monopoly promotion on The Daily Beast. This story of a former police officer who stole $20 million in cash and prizes became the subject of a bidding war in Hollywood. The sale of the movie rights to Ben Affleck, Matt Damon, and Twentieth Century Fox for $1 million was reported by The Hollywood Reporter as the highest fee ever paid for a single magazine article.

== Bibliography ==
- Lilywhite and Blue: The History of Tottenham's Famous Shirt. Jeff Maysh Books. 2010. ISBN 978-0956684202.
- Handsome Devil. Kindle singles. 2016. ASIN B01CR9PQ6Y.
- The Spy With No Name: The Cold War and a Case of Stolen Identity. Kindle singles. 2017. ASIN B01NBR1CNV.
