= Edging =

Edging may refer to:

- Using an edger gardening tool
- Edging (climbing), a climbing technique
- Edging (sexual practice), a form of orgasm control
- Edging (forging), an open-die forging process that concentrates material for further processing
- "Edging" (song), by Blink-182, 2022

== See also ==
- Edge (disambiguation)
