= Colours FM =

Dhaka; Bangladesh
- Frequency: 101.6 MHz

Programming
- Language: Bangla
- Format: Music radio

Ownership
- Owner: Adcomm

History
- First air date: 10 January 2014

Links
- Website: colours.fm

Colours FM is a Bangladeshi FM radio station, the headquarters of which is situated in Dhaka. It started broadcasting on 10 January 2014.

== Programming ==
- Power Woman, a show launched in 2014, interviews successful women.
- Teen Tekka, about teenagers' personal problems, premiered in April 2015.
- Islam and Life, which discusses Islam and answers audience questions, aired more than 1,400 daily episodes through 2021.
