= Edge House =

Historic house in Florida, United States

- U.S. National Register of Historic Places
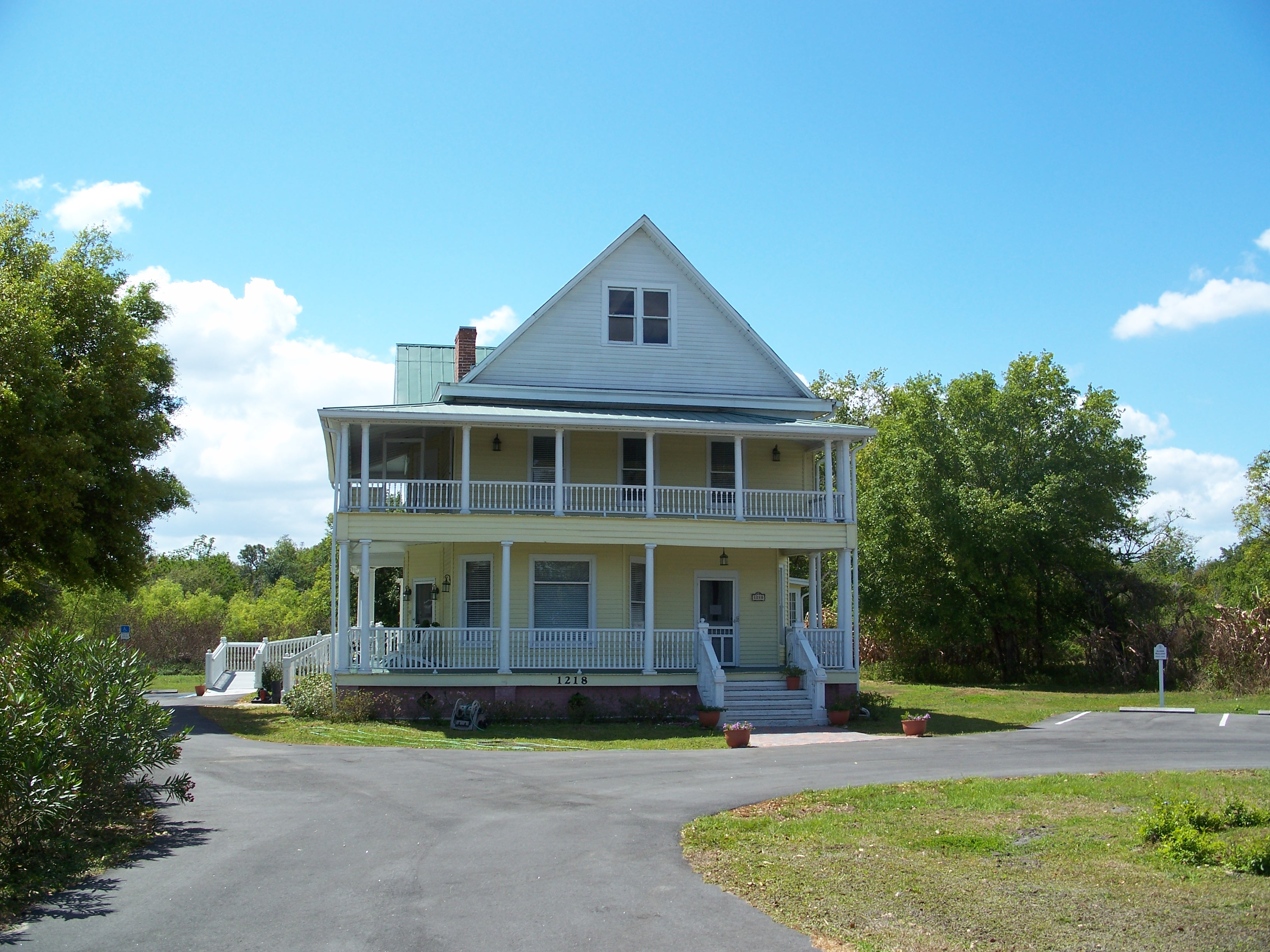

- Location within Florida
- Location: Groveland, Florida
- Coordinates: 28°33′54″N 81°52′15″W
- Built: 1902
- Architect: Elliot E. Edge
- Architectural style: Queen Anne
- NRHP reference No.: 06000917
- Added to NRHP: October 5, 2006

The Edge House is a historic house located at 1218 West Broad Street in Groveland, Florida. It is locally significant as an excellent example of a Queen Anne Style residence, and is also the only example of this style in the City of Groveland.

== Description and history ==
The two-story wood-frame building has an asymmetrical plan with bays. The building measures approximately 53 feet by 37 feet and has an irregular footprint. It has a steeply pitched complex hip roof with gables on the north and south ends, and gable dormer windows on the east and a gable dormer vent on the west side. A corbelled brick chimney pierces the east slope. Horizontal wood siding serves as the exterior walls. Horizontal aluminum siding was added to most exterior walls sometime after 1988. Fenestration is asymmetrical, and includes 1/1 double-hung wooden sash windows, and transoms with leaded glass in diamond patterns.

It was built in 1902 by one of Groveland's founding citizens, Elliot E. Edge. Edge was one of the first elected city officials. The Edge Memorial Methodist Church was named in memory of him after his death in 1934. Edge's son, L. D. Edge, had the distinction of being the youngest man ever elected to the Florida State Legislature. To save the house from demolition and preserve this Groveland landmark, it was moved almost one mile west of its original location when a fast-food restaurant company decided to build on its original site in 1988.

It was added to the National Register of Historic Places on October 5, 2006.
