= City FM 96.0 =

City FM
Dhaka; Bangladesh
- Frequency: 96.0 MHz

Programming
- Language: Bengali
- Format: Music radio

Ownership
- Owner: Syedur Aftab

History
- First air date: April 3, 2013

Technical information
- Translator: Moshiur Rahman

Links
- Website: www.annymo.net/cityfm

City FM is a private FM radio station in Bangladesh. Broadcasting on 96.0 FM in Dhaka, it started its official transmission on March 23, 2013. The station was officially opened by Hasanul Haq Inu, Bangladesh's federal Minister of Information.
