= Radio Amber =

- Dhaka; Bangladesh
- Frequency: 102.4 MHz

Programming
- Language: Bangla
- Format: Music radio

History
- First air date: 1 September 2016

Links
- Website: radioamber.com

Radio Amber is a Bangladeshi FM radio station, headquartered in Dhaka. It started regular broadcasts on 1 September 2016. It is connected with the ISP and VoIP provider Amer IT.
