= Bangladesh Betar Traffic Broadcasting =

Dhaka; Bangladesh
- Frequency: 88.8 MHz
- Branding: Traffic FM

Programming
- Language: Bengali
- Format: Public

Ownership
- Owner: Bangladesh Betar

History
- First air date: 26 May 2005

Links
- Website: trafficfm.org

Bangladesh Betar Traffic Broadcasting, commonly known as Traffic FM, is a Bangladesh Betar-owned radio station broadcasting on 88.8 FM in Dhaka, Bangladesh. It is the oldest FM radio station in Bangladesh, launched on May 26, 2005.
