= Over the Hedge (disambiguation) =

Over the Hedge is a 2006 animated comedy.

Over the Hedge may also refer to:

- Over the Hedge (comic strip), a syndicated comic strip
- Over the Hedge (video game), a video game based on the film, using events in the film
- Over the Hedge (Nintendo DS video game), a Nintendo DS video game based on the film, set after the events in the film
- Over the Hedge (soundtrack), soundtrack of the same name of the film
