= Radio Din Raat =

- Dhaka, Bangladesh; Bangladesh
- Frequency: 93.6 MHz

Programming
- Language: Bangla
- Format: Music Radio

Ownership
- Owner: Square Group

History
- First air date: 2016

Links
- Website: radiodinraat.fm

Radio Din Raat is a Bangladeshi FM radio station in Dhaka. It started broadcasting on 2016. The owner of the radio station is Square Group.
