= Cutting Edge (magazine) =

Belgian online trade publication

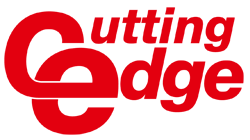
- Website type: Online trade magazine
- Available in: Dutch
- Founded: 2002; 24 years ago
- Country of origin: Belgium
- Owner: Kevin Major
- Editor: Wibo Vanhomwegen
- Website: www.cuttingedge.be
- Registration: No
- Current status: Active

Cutting Edge is an online trade magazine founded in 2002 in Kampenhout, Belgium. It provides reviews, articles, and event coverage across a range of sectors, including music, literature, theater, film, gaming, and visual arts. Based in Belgium and published primarily in Dutch, the magazine serves as a resource for industry professionals, artists, and cultural enthusiasts in both Belgium and the Netherlands.

== History ==
Cutting Edge was founded in 2002 by Kevin Major, Heidi Lenaerts, and Tim Vanderbeken, who all had prior experience in the radio industry, particularly with Studio Brussel. Their background in media contributed to the establishment of the magazine as a platform for cultural critique and commentary. After the departure of Lenaerts and Vanderbeken in 2004, Major continued to lead the publication.

As a trade magazine, Cutting Edge emphasizes industry-specific insights and commentary. It features in-depth reviews of new releases across various mediums, providing analyses that are relevant to industry stakeholders. The magazine also includes articles discussing trends and challenges within the cultural industries, as well as interviews with artists and industry leaders, offering perspectives on the evolving cultural landscape.

In 2006, the magazine initiated the Cutting Edge Awards, which are presented annually in Ghent. These awards recognize exemplary achievements in the cultural sector, celebrating outstanding contributions across multiple fields. It later launched the first Easter Edge Festival in Antwerp, showcasing a range of cultural performances and activities. The inaugural edition played host to Delavega, Yasmine, Gene Bervoets, and Don Johnson, among others. In 2010, the magazine expanded its operations into the Netherlands.

As of 2011, the editorial team of Cutting Edge comprised 114 members.

== Other ventures ==
Cutting Edge Awards is an annual awards show that celebrates the best in film, music, literature, and other cultural fields from the past year. The nominations and winners are determined by a panel of industry experts. The ceremony has traditionally been held in Ghent during the first quarter of the year, with some editions taking place in Antwerp.
