= Radio Dhol =

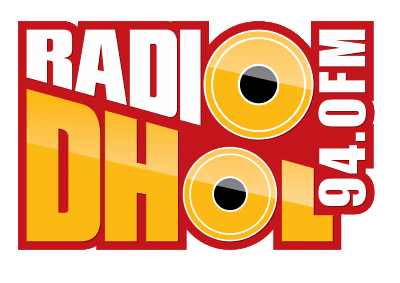
- Dhaka; Bangladesh
- Frequency: 94.0 MHz

Programming
- Language: Bangla
- Format: Music Radio

History
- First air date: 10 December 2015

Links
- Webcast: Dhol App iOS, Play Store
- Website: radiodhol.fm

Radio Dhol 94.0 FM (Bengali: রেডিও ঢোল ৯৪.০ এফএম) is a Bangladeshi FM radio station. The station began operations on December 10, 2015 solely serving Dhaka. However, the station was later shut down.
