= Paul Baxendale-Walker =

British lawyer, publisher and TV host

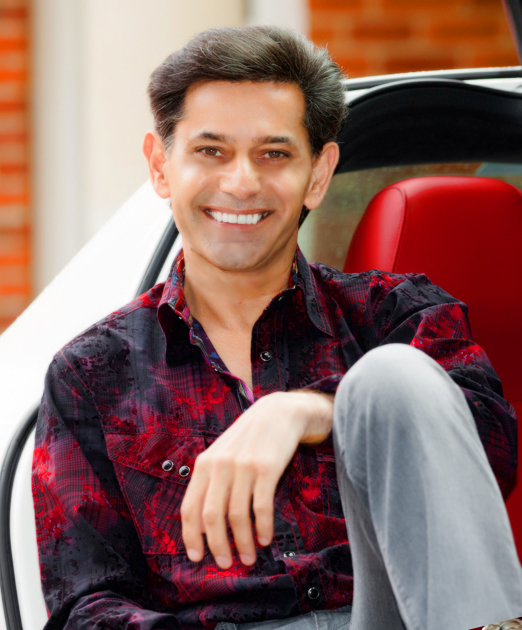
- Paul Baxendale-Walker
- Education: Hertford College, Oxford
- Presenting career
- Show: Red Zone
- Station: EMTV
- Country: United Kingdom

Paul Baxendale-Walker, also known under the stage name Paul Chaplin, is a British businessman who worked as a solicitor until being struck off in 2007. He has since worked as a talk show host and pornographic film producer, director, and actor. He is, together with Andrew Thornhill QC, the author of The Law and Taxation of Remuneration Trusts (Key Haven, 1997) and also the Purpose Trusts (1999, 2009 [2nd ed.]).

== Early life and education ==
Paul Baxendale-Walker was born of Anglo-Brazilian parents, but he was orphaned and grew up in Children's Homes. He read for a degree in law at Hertford College, Oxford and subsequently qualified as a barrister and solicitor.

== Career ==
Walker worked in taxation law at the Bar in Lincoln's Inn and then in various City law firms and Arthur Andersen, before establishing his "Baxendale Walker" practice in Mayfair in 1994.

In 1994, Baxendale-Walker advised the trustees on the taking of loans from a pension fund established for the benefit of employees. Unknown to him, the borrowers were fraudsters, and £2,135,000 went missing. In subsequent civil proceedings, Mr. Justice Etherton dismissed the claim that Baxendale-Walker had given dishonest assistance in a breach of trust but held him liable for knowing receipt of the fees which he had received, saying that completing the transaction was "a gross error of professional judgment". In the course of the civil trial, it came to light that he had given a reference for a non-existent persona of the fraudsters, a move that the judge said showed "breathtaking lack of professional judgement". As a consequence, in 2005, the Solicitors Disciplinary Tribunal suspended him as a solicitor for three years. The Court of Appeal upheld the decision in 2007.

Baxendale-Walker was struck off the roll of solicitors by the Solicitors' Disciplinary Tribunal on 11 January 2007, on the grounds that he had a conflict of interest in advising his clients on his own tax schemes. He subsequently claimed that the Law Society and others had conspired to put him out of business. On 18 April 2011, his claim was struck out by the High Court on the basis that it had no real prospect of success, and on the grounds that the defendants were immune from civil suit and/or protected by privilege, regardless of whether they had committed any wrong. He sued the Law Society in California Federal Court for millions of dollars, arising out of what he claims to have been unlawful interference by the Law Society in his US legal business, but the case was dismissed with prejudice, an action that was upheld on appeal in 2015. Linked proceedings were issued in the Virginia Eastern District Court in February 2016, relating to the evidence relied on in the California case.

He was the author of the Employee Benefit Trust (EBT) tax strategy implemented by Rangers football club which was, in April 2011, challenged by HMRC in a first tier tax tribunal. In November 2012, on a split decision, the Tribunal upheld the legality and tax effectiveness of the EBT strategy. HMRC appealed twice, first to the Upper Tribunal (Tax and Chancery Division) which upheld the finding, and then to the Scottish Court of Session which sided with HMRC, declaring that it was "obvious" that "payments to the various trusts and the application of the monies so paid amounted to a mere redirection of earnings which did not remove the liability of employees to income tax". Rangers entered administration on 14 February 2012, and went into liquidation on 31 October 2012. The liquidators of Rangers have been granted leave to appeal the decision of the Court of Session to the UK Supreme Court. Lord Carloway, one of the Court of Sessions judges who ruled on the case, said: "The Court is of the view that there is an arguable point in law of public interest which should allow the appeal to the UK Supreme Court to proceed."

The High Court proceedings against the Law Society led to allegations of fraud and forgery against Baxendale-Walker. On Friday 15 April 2016 Baxendale-Walker pleaded guilty to one count of forgery. Five other counts of fraud will remain on file. He was fined £15,015 and ordered to pay £210,000 prosecution costs. Judge Moss said “Your intention in writing the letter was to lead the recipient to tell you things he would otherwise not have done. You determined by trick and underhand means to pursue an individual who was correctly employed by the SRA (Solicitors Regulatory Authority). Such people are entitled to be protected from the harassment you subjected them to.” The prosecution accepted that Mr Baxendale-Walker's motive in sending the letter was to obtain information about legal proceedings concerning him, and that there was no financial gain intended.

In 2023, HMRC's attempt to impose a £14 million penalty on Paul Baxendale-Walker collapsed after a tribunal ruled that the tax authority had made procedural errors, including missing a statutory deadline. The case related to information notices served in 2022 as part of HMRCs long-standing efforts to hold Baxendale-Walker accountable for promoting tax avoidance schemes that the agency claims cost the UK over £1 billion in revenue. Baxendale-Walker denied the allegations, calling the penalty a fiction.

== Media ==
He was the host of the TV discussion show Red Zone, which features political and media celebrities discussing randomly chosen subjects from "Devil Cards", without the usual time constraints of topical discussion shows. Red Zone debuted on EMTV (Sky channel 200) on 4 March 2009. His guests have included Boy George, Neil and Christine Hamilton, Richard Digance, Robin Bextor, Vicki Michelle, Carole Malone, Aisleyne Horgan-Wallace, Garry Bushell, Lawrie McMenemy, Derek Laud, Ray Santilli, and others.

From 2005 to 2012, he owned the adult film company Bluebird Productions, and he has produced, directed and acted in a number of adult films. He sold Bluebird in 2012, making an estimated US$20 million.

On 26 November 2012, Loaded TV launched with an 8-hour programming schedule on Controversial TV. Loaded TV provides general entertainment programmes, aimed at both young male and female audiences and a wider audience.

== Publishing ==
In May 2012, he purchased Loaded and SuperBike magazines, and, in September 2012, he purchased the Paul Raymond Publications stable of magazines, including Mayfair, Men Only and Club International. Walker purchased Loaded on behalf of Blue Media Publishing Group, however Blue Publishing entered administration a year later.

Baxendale-Walker writes a monthly Agony column for Loaded magazine. He also writes a monthly editorial and shoots a special photoset for Mayfair magazine. He also ran a short lived, weekly spin-off magazine from Loaded called Zip Magazine.

== Published books ==
- The Law and Taxation of Remuneration Trusts (Key Haven, 1997, ISBN 1-870070-93-3)
- Purpose Trusts (Butterworths, 1999); 2nd edition (Tottel Publishing; 2009, ISBN 1-84592-484-3)
