= Cutting Edge Haunted House =

American tourist attraction

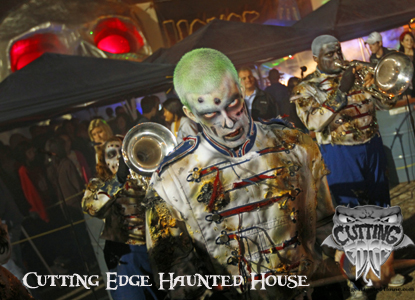
- Outside drummer at Cutting Edge Haunted House
- Interactive map of Cutting Edge Haunted House
- Location: Fort Worth, Texas, US
- Coordinates: 32.7464°N 97.3103°W
- Status: Operating
- Opened: October 1991
- Operating season: Halloween
- Website: Official website

Cutting Edge Haunted House is a haunted house attraction located in Fort Worth, Texas. Originally opened in Austin, Texas in 1991, it was relocated to an abandoned meat-packing factory near the intersection of I-30 and I-35W in 1998. The haunted house uses the factory's old conveyor system to suspend mannequins on S-shaped meat hooks as a prop element.

From 2009-2010 and briefly in October 2015, Guinness World Records recognized the attraction as the "longest walk-through horror house (indoors)".

== History ==
In 1991, Cutting Edge Haunted House opened their first location in Austin, Texas before relocating in 1998 to a former meat-packing factory in Fort Worth, Texas that was left abandoned for several years. The meat-packing plant resided in a historical section of Fort Worth, Texas referred to as Hell's Half Acre, which in the 19th century was well known for saloons, brothels, and rampant violence. The building remained untouched for nearly a century before being purchased and being turned into a haunted house. The meat-packing plant's original conveyor system was repurposed as part of the attraction with prop "butchered corpses" and mannequins being conveyed up and around the two stories of the building. Cutting Edge Haunted House includes live sets, animations, and live actors as part of the attraction. In 2009 and 2015 the Guinness World Records recognized the attraction as the "longest walk-through horror house (indoors)" with a total length of 2,261 feet (689 m).

== Awards ==
=== Guinness World Record ===
In 2009 and 2015, Cutting Edge held the Guinness World Record for the "Longest Walk-through Horror House (indoors)".

=== Other awards ===
- 2021 #1 for USA Today Best Haunted Attraction.
- 2015, 2016 Voted "Top 13 Haunted House" by HauntedHouses.com.
- 2015 Fifth scariest haunted house by Fox News Travel.
- 2014 Fifth Craziest, Scariest Haunted Attraction by E! Online.
- 2012 Fourth longest haunted house in America by Hauntworld.com.
- 2009–2015 Voted number 8 in "Top 13 Haunted Houses in America" by Hauntworld Magazine.
- 2008–2015 Voted "Top 13 Haunted House In America" by Hauntworld Magazine.
- 2008–2015 Voted number 5 in the nation of "The 13 Best Haunts for Halloween" by US Airways Magazine.
- 2007–2015 Voted "Top 5 Haunted House in America" by HauntedHouseRatings.com.
- 1991–2014 Multiple winner of "Texas Best Haunted House".
