= Pitch =

Pitch may refer to:

== Acoustic frequency ==
- Pitch (music), the perceived frequency of sound including "definite pitch" and "indefinite pitch"
  - Absolute pitch or "perfect pitch"
  - Pitch class, a set of all pitches that are a whole number of octaves apart
  - Relative pitch, the ability to identify a given musical interval between two notes
- Pitch accent, a form of accentuation in speech

== Business ==
- Sales pitch, a line of talk that attempts to persuade someone or something
  - Pitch (filmmaking), a proposal for a film
  - Elevator pitch, a very short sales presentation, allegedly short enough to be made during an elevator ride

== Measurement ==
=== Movement about the transverse axis ===
- Pitch angle (or pitch rotation), one of the angular degrees of freedom of any stiff body (for example a vehicle), describing rotation about the side-to-side axis
  - Pitch (aviation), one of the aircraft principal axes of rotation (nose-up or nose-down angle measured from horizontal axis)
  - Pitch (ship motion), one of the ship motions' principal axes of rotation (bow-up or bow-down angle measured from horizontal axis)
- Pitch-up, an uncommanded nose-upwards aerodynamical rotation of an aircraft.

=== Angle measurement ===
- Pitch or grade (slope), the steepness of a slope or an object confirming to a slope
  - Roof pitch relates to the slope and inclination angle
- Pitch, or rake, in geology, the angle between a line and the strike of the plane on which it was found

=== Electromagnetism ===
- Pitch angle (particle motion), the angle between a charged particle's velocity vector and the local magnetic field

=== Mechanical engineering ===
- Pitch angle (engineering), the angle between a bevel gears' element of a pitch cone and its axis

=== Linear measurement ===
"Pitch" is widely used to describe the distance between repeated elements in a structure possessing translational symmetry:

- Pitch (gear), the distance between a point on one tooth and the corresponding point on an adjacent tooth
- Pitch (screw) the distance between turns of a screw thread
  - Blade pitch the distance between the front edge and the rear edge of a propeller blade
  - Pitch, the distance between passes in the helical scanning pattern of X-ray computed tomography
- Pitch (typewriter), the number of characters and spaces in one inch (25.4 mm) of running text
- Pitch, the distance between bits in a parallel integrated circuit element such as a register file
- Dot pitch in images
- Pin pitch, the distance between centers of pins in electronics packaging
- Seat pitch, the spacing between seat rows in an aircraft

== Arts, entertainment, and media ==
- Pitch (film)
- Pitch (TV series)
- Pitch Weekly, a free urban weekly newspaper in Kansas City
- Pitch, a bird-like character in Kirby's Dream Land 3

== Plants ==
- Pitch (resin), a viscous substance produced by plants or formed from petroleum
- Pitch Pine (Pinus rigida), trees

== Sports and recreation ==
- Pitch (climbing), a term used in climbing and also caving
- Pitch (baseball), a throw of a baseball from a pitcher to the catcher(s)
- Pitch (card game) (or "High, or Low Jack"), an American trick-taking card game
- Pitch (sports field), a field of play and is usually outdoors
  - Cricket pitch
  - Field hockey pitch
  - Rugby pitch
  - Football pitch
- The bounce of a cricket ball
- Pitch, a lateral pass in gridiron football
- Pitching, the process of assembling a tent

== See also ==
- Pitch Black (disambiguation)
- Pitcher
- Pitchfork
- Pitchware
- "Pitchy", a song by Basshunter from his Calling Time album
- The Pitch (disambiguation)
- Pitch (resin)
