= Asian Radio =

Radio station in Dhaka, Bangladesh

- Dhaka; Bangladesh
- Frequency: 90.8 MHz

Programming
- Language: Bengali
- Format: Music Radio

History
- First air date: 18 January 2013

Links
- Website: asianradio908.com

Asian Radio (Bengali: এশিয়ান রেডিও) was a Bangladeshi Bengali-language radio station broadcast on FM radio. It was based in Dhaka, and was a sister network to Asian TV. It began broadcasting on 18 January 2013 and official transmissions on 23 September 2013. The station later shut down.

== Notable Programs ==
Some notable programs of the radio channel are:

- Bidyasagor Chatrabas
- Looking for Bou
- Sokha Tumi Kar
- Telesmati
- The Mama Show
