= Cutting Edge Creations =

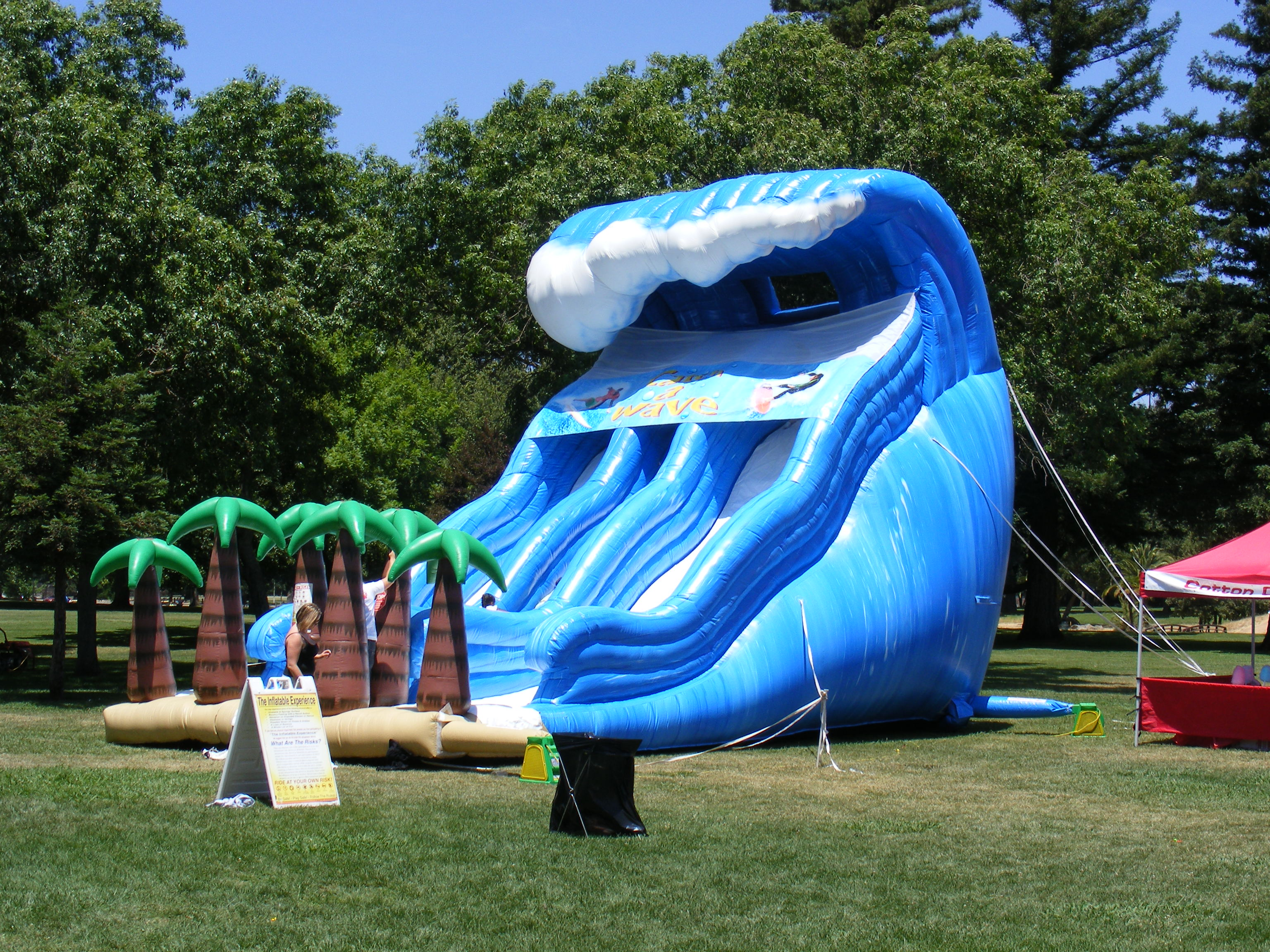
inflatable structure created by Cutting Edge Creations

Cutting Edge Creations (CEC) is an Eagan, Minnesota-based inflatables company that sells inflatable structures, including bounce houses, slides, advertising inflatables, movie projection screens, obstacle courses, and interactive games.

== History ==
Cutting Edge Creations was founded in 1986 by brothers Bob and Brian Field. CEC manufactures inflatables both for the amusement rental industry, as well as inflatable advertising. By 1998 CEC was one of the largest inflatable manufacturers in the US and growing at a rate of 30% per year

== Brands ==
CEC manufactures products under the following brands:

- i-bounce: all Cutting Edge Creation bounce houses are promoted under the i-bounce brand
  - Belly Bouncer: a specific line of bounce house that is designed to look like a playful animal on its back (so the belly is the bouncing surface).
- AIR-Supply: products that are specifically engineered or approved for heavy use in Indoor Entertainment Centers
- Playlites: products designed for very young children

== Safety ==
CEC pioneered efforts to establish correct slide angles, tethering attachments, wall and upper deck heights, which were submitted to both the ASTM and the United States Consumer Product Safety Commission (USCPCS). They also assist in the writing of safeguards for inflatable amusement devices that have been adopted by safety inspectors from the ASTM and the USCPSC. CEC's website states that all of its products comply with safety regulation in all 50 states of the US. Numerous additional and redundant safety features are also incorporated (i.e. sun shades, fine mesh walls in which children's fingers can't get caught), for which CEC was named Most Safety Conscious Manufacturer

CEC has a patent pending for their Captured Air Support system, which creates a sealed chamber to prevent the rapid collapse of ceiling and walls of their inflatable structures in the event that electric power to the blowers fails. CEC owners also own the patent on the Watchdog Siren System, a device that alerts operators if the blower attached to an inflatable fails for any reason. As inflatable structures deflate somewhat slowly, a warning when the blower first ceases to function give plenty of time to evacuate the inflatable, or correct the blower problem.

CEC has been involved in controversy over the safety of its products and is a defendant in a lawsuit asserting that the company's alleged negligence was a factor in the death of a young Minnesota man.

In August 2010, The California Attorney General filed suit against Cutting Edge Creations Inc for "Testing done by the Center for the Environmental Health and the Attorney General's office found that some of the vinyl in the bounce houses contains lead levels that violate both federal and state regulations".

== Controversy ==
Cutting Edge Creations has made news for their vigorous defense of their copyrights. They have filed numerous lawsuits against offenders, and took out a full page ad in an industry magazine offering a $5,000 reward for "information leading to a successful copyright infringement prosecution."

== Web Software ==
In late 2007, CEC released a free web application called the Facilitator. The Facilitator allows users to create a three-dimensional model of a room of any size, indoor or outdoor, and place models of any of CEC's products in the room. They have also included models of common elements, such as trees, doors, pillars, windows, tables, and so forth.

In mid-2008 Cutting Edge Creations started BouncerDirectory.com, a web directory designed to guide North American consumers to rental companies that service their area. The directory service is offered for free, with no charge for listing or use.
