= 102.1 The Edge =

102.1 The Edge may refer to:

- CFNY-FM (branded as 102.1 The Edge) in Toronto, Canada
- Edge FM 102.1 in Wangaratta, Victoria, Australia
- KDGE (branded as Star 102.1) in Dallas, Texas, U.S.

== See also ==
- The Edge (disambiguation) § Radio
