= Peoples Radio =

Dhaka; Bangladesh
- Frequency: 91.6 MHz

Programming
- Language: Bengali
- Format: Music radio

History
- First air date: 11 December 2011

Links
- Website: peoplesradio.fm

Peoples Radio is a Dhaka-based 24-hour private FM Radio station in Bangladesh. It started the commercial launching on 11 December 2011. Its main station is located at PFI Tower (Opposite of Eunus Tower), Dilkusha, Dhaka. However, apart from Dhaka, it broadcasts in 15 districts around Dhaka.
