= Carbonization =

Conversion of matter to carbon

Carbonization or carbonisation is the conversion of organic matters like plants and dead animal remains into carbon through destructive distillation.

== Complexity in carbonization ==
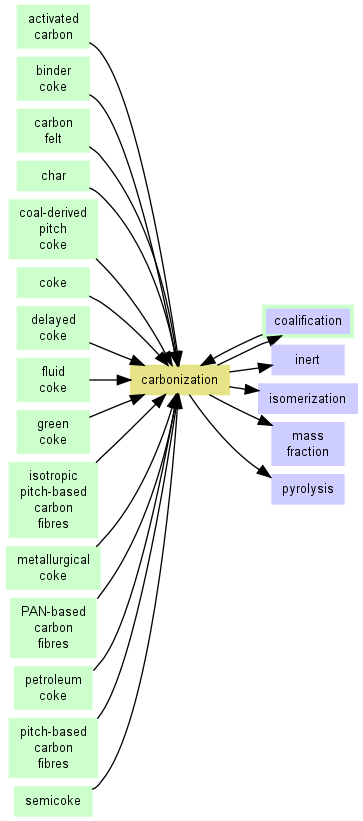
A series of processes that involve carbonization.

Carbonization is a pyrolytic reaction, therefore, is considered a complex process in which many reactions take place concurrently such as dehydrogenation, condensation, hydrogen transfer and isomerization.

Carbonization differs from coalification in that it occurs much faster.

For the final pyrolysis temperature, the amount of heat applied controls the degree of carbonization and the residual content of foreign elements. For example, at T ~ 1,200 K (930 °C; 1,700 °F) the carbon content of the residue exceeds a mass fraction of 90 wt.%, whereas at T ~ 1,600 K (1,330 °C; 2,420 °F) more than 99 wt.% carbon is found. Carbonization is often exothermic, which means that it could in principle be made self-sustaining and be used as a source of energy that does not produce carbon dioxide. In the case of glucose, the reaction releases about 237 calories per gram.

When biomaterial is exposed to sudden searing heat (as in the case of a nuclear explosion or pyroclastic flow from a volcano, for instance), it can be carbonized extremely quickly, turning it into solid carbon. In the destruction of Herculaneum by a volcano, many organic objects such as wooden furniture were carbonized by the intense heat.

== How wood is transformed into charcoal ==
The carbonization of wood in an industrial setting usually requires a temperature above 280 °C (536 °F), which frees up energy and hence this reaction is said to be exothermic. This carbonization, which can also be seen as a spontaneous breakdown of the wood, continues until only the carbonised residue called charcoal remains. Unless further external heat is provided, the process stops and the temperature reaches a maximum of about 400 °C (752 °F). This charcoal, however, will still contain appreciable amounts of tar residue, together with the ash of the original wood.

== Industrial safety in carbonization ==
Carbonization produces substances which can prove harmful and simple precautions should be taken to reduce risks.

The gas produced by carbonization has a high content of carbon monoxide which is poisonous when breathed. Therefore, when working around the kiln or pit during operation and when the kiln is opened for unloading, care must be taken that proper ventilation is provided to allow the carbon monoxide, which is also produced during unloading through spontaneous ignition of the hot fuel, to be dispersed.

The tars and smoke produced from carbonization, although not directly poisonous, may have long-term damaging effects on the respiratory system. Housing areas should, where possible, be located so that prevailing winds carry smoke from charcoal operations away from them and batteries of kilns should not be located in close proximity to housing areas.

Wood tars and pyroligneous acid can be irritant to skin and care should be taken to avoid prolonged skin contact by providing protective clothing and adopting working procedures which minimize exposure.

The tars and pyroligneous liquors can also seriously contaminate streams and affect drinking water supplies for humans and animals. Fish may also be adversely affected. Liquid effluents and waste water from medium and large scale charcoal operations should be trapped in large settling ponds and allowed to evaporate so that this water does not pass into the local drainage system and contaminate streams. Kilns and pits, as distinct from retorts and other sophisticated systems, do not normally produce liquid effluent - the by-products are mostly dispersed into the air as vapours. Precautions against airborne contamination of the environment are of greater importance in this case.

== Carbonization and biodiesel fuels ==
In one study, carbonization was used to create a new catalyst for the generation of biodiesel from ethanol and fatty acids. The catalyst was created by carbonization of simple sugars such as glucose and sucrose. The sugars were processed for 15 hours at 400 °C under a nitrogen flow to a black carbon residue consisting of a complex mixture of polycyclic aromatic carbon sheets. This material was then treated with sulfuric acid, which functionalized the sheets with sulfonite, carboxyl, and hydroxyl catalytic sites.

== See also ==
- Coke (fuel)
- Torrification
- Plastic carbonization
- Pyrolysis
