= Bangla Radio =

- Dhaka; Bangladesh
- Frequency: 95.2 MHz

Programming
- Language: Bangla
- Format: Music

History
- First air date: 3 February 2016

Links
- Website: banglaradio.fm

Bangla Radio is a Bangladeshi FM radio station headquartered in Dhaka. It started broadcasting on 12 June 2016. In 2018, the FM station signed an agreement with Voice Of America to broadcasting Voice Of America programs.
