= Bangladesh Betar =

Public radio broadcaster of Bangladesh

Coordinates: 23.7400°N 90.3965°E

Bangladesh Betar; বাংলাদেশ বেতার

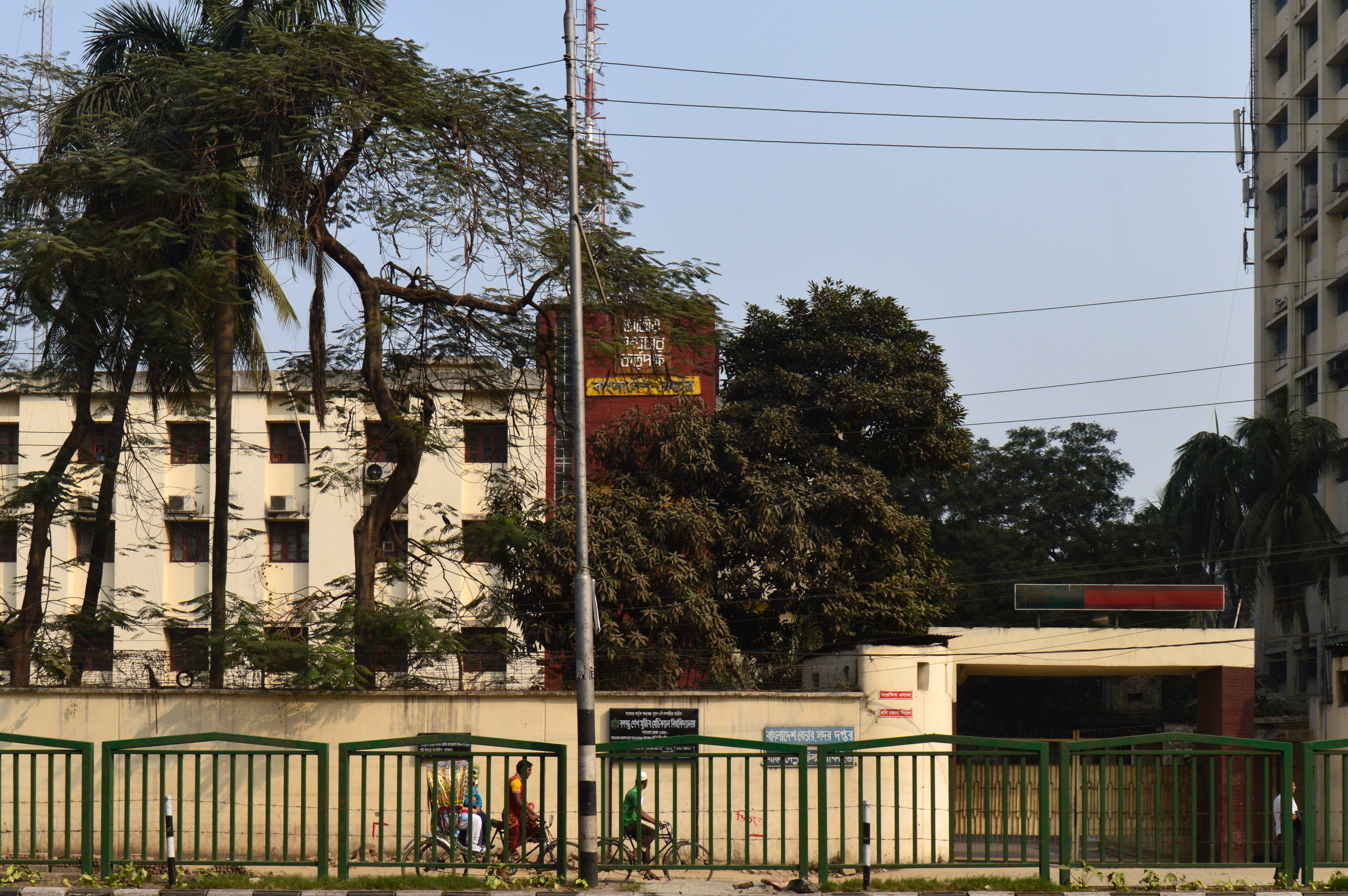
- Type: National public broadcaster
- Country: Bangladesh
- Headquarters: Agargaon, Dhaka
- Broadcast area: National; Worldwide
- Owner: Government of Bangladesh
- Launch date: 16 December 1939; 86 years ago
- Affiliation: World Radio Network
- Official website: betar.gov.bd

Bangladesh Betar (Bengali: বাংলাদেশ বেতার; lit. 'Bangladesh Radio') is the state-owned radio broadcaster of Bangladesh, initially established as the Dhaka station of All India Radio in 1939. It was later made part of Radio Pakistan. After the independence of the country in 1971, Radio Pakistan ceased transmissions there, and the Swadhin Bangla Betar Kendra was renamed to Bangladesh Betar, which took full control of all radio stations in the country at the time.

Bangladesh Betar is a sister service to Bangladesh Television, which is also state-owned. It operates several AM and FM stations around Bangladesh. It also broadcasts in six languages, including Bengali, to listeners in the country and overseas. A S M Zahid is the Director General of Bangladesh Betar.

== History ==
=== Early years ===
Radio transmission in the region now known as Bangladesh commenced in Dhaka on 16 December 1939 during British rule, as a part of All India Radio. Initially, the station was located on Nazimuddin Road in Old Dhaka. Its maximum transmission range was 45 kilometres. Leila Arjumand Banu performed on the first day of broadcasting. After the territory eventually fell into Pakistani rule in 1947, the station in Dhaka became a part of Radio Pakistan. In 1954, broadcasting started in Rajshahi. On 8 September 1960, the radio station was moved to a modern office in Shahbag with six professional studios. More regional stations were opened in Sylhet in 1961, Savar in 1963, Rangpur in 1967, and Khulna in 1970.

=== Independence of Bangladesh ===
Radio played an important role during the Bangladesh War of 1971. On 26 March 1971, the broadcasting centre of Radio Pakistan was used to transmit a declaration of independence, which was picked up by a Japanese ship in Chittagong Harbor and retransmitted. On 26 March 1971, as the Pakistan Army took over the radio station in Dhaka, the Swadhin Bangla Biplobi Betar Kendra clandestine radio station was established in a two-storey building in Kalurghat, constantly broadcasting Sheikh Mujibur Rahman's call for independence. The station was later renamed Swadhin Bangla Betar Kendra (Independent Bengal Radio Station). Because of heavy shelling, the station had to be relocated several times. It was first relocated to Tripura on 3 April, and ultimately moved to Kolkata on 25 May, from where it would broadcast until the end of the war.

=== Post-independence ===
On 6 December, the Swadhin Bangla Betar Kendra was renamed to Bangladesh Betar, which ultimately replaced Radio Pakistan in Bangladesh. The radio broadcaster was renamed to Radio Bangladesh in 1975, but was reverted to Bangladesh Betar in 1996. Its current headquarters were completed in 1983 at National Broadcasting House, Agargaon. Bangladesh Betar was the sole radio broadcaster in Bangladesh until the establishment of Radio Metrowave in 1999, which itself was shut down on 27 June 2005. In January 2020, the programming of Bangladesh Betar began to be distributed to India via All India Radio's stations in Kolkata and Agartala, and also on AIR's app.

== Stations ==
Schedule MW

Center	Frequency (kHz)	Meter	Power (kW)	Broadcast Time(Local)
Dhaka-ka	693	432.90	1000	06:30-12:10 and 14:15-23:30
Dhaka-kha	819	476.19	100	00:00-03:00, 06:30-12:10 and 14:15-23:30
Dhaka-Ga	1170	256.41	20	15:00-17:00
Chittagong	873	343.64	100	06:30-10:00 and 12:00-23:10
Rajshahi	1080	277.77	10	06:30-10:00 and 12:00-23:10
Rajshahi	846	354.60	100	06:30-10:00 and 12:00-23:10
Khulna	558	537.63	100	06:30-10:00 and 12:00-23:10
Rangpur	1053	284.90	10	06:30-10:00 and 14:00-23:10
Sylhet	963	311.52	20	06:30-10:00 and 12:00-23:15
Barishal	1287	233.10	10	06:30-11:15 and 14:55-23:15
Thakurgaon	999	300.30	10	06:30-11:10 and 15:00-23:10
Rangamati	1161	258.39	10	11:00-21:00
Cox's Bazar	1314	228.31	10	08:30-14:10
Bandarban	1431	209.64	10	11:00-21:00
Cumilla	1413	212.31	10	11:00-23:30

Schedule FM

Center	Frequency (MHz)	Meter	Power (KW)	Broadcast Time(Local)
FM100, Dhaka	100.0	3.00	3, 10	06:00-12:00, 13:00-15:00, 17:00-23:45, 00:00-03:00
FM, Dhaka	97.6	3.07	5	06:30-12:00; 14:15-23:15
Traffic Broadcasting, Dhaka	88.8	3.38	10	07:00-23:00
FM 90.0	90.0	3.33	5	09:00-19:00
FM 95.0 (Home Service)	95.0	17:30-22:00		
FM, Chittagong	105.5	2.85	2	06:30-10:00; 19:00-23:10
FM, Khulna	102.0	2.94	1	06:30-10:00; 19:00-23:15
FM, Rajshahi	104.0	2.88	5	06:30-10:00; 19:00-23:10
FM, Rajshahi	88.8	3.38	10	06:30-10:00; 14:00-23:10 (Sun-Thursday) and 14:00-15:00; 16:00-23:10 (Friday-Saturday)
FM, Rangpur	105.0	2.86	1	06:30-10:00; 19:00-23:10
FM, Rangpur	105.6	2.84	1	14:00-15:00; 18:20-23:00
FM, Cumilla	103.6 & 101.2	2.96	2	06:30-10:00; 17:00-23:10
FM, Thakurgoan	92.0	3.26	5	06:30-11:15, 14:00-15:00, 16:30-23:15
FM, Gopalganj	92.0	3.26	10	08:00-11:00, 14:05-16:00, 17:00-21:00
FM, Cox's Bazar	100.8	2.98	10	06:30-15:55, 19:00-23:10
FM, Mymensingh	92.0	3.26	10	08:00-11:00, 14:05-16:00, 17:00-21:00

== See also ==
- Telecommunications in Bangladesh
- Radio Pakistan
- All India Radio
