= The Edge (Amsterdam) =

Coordinates: 52°20′13″N 4°51′43″E

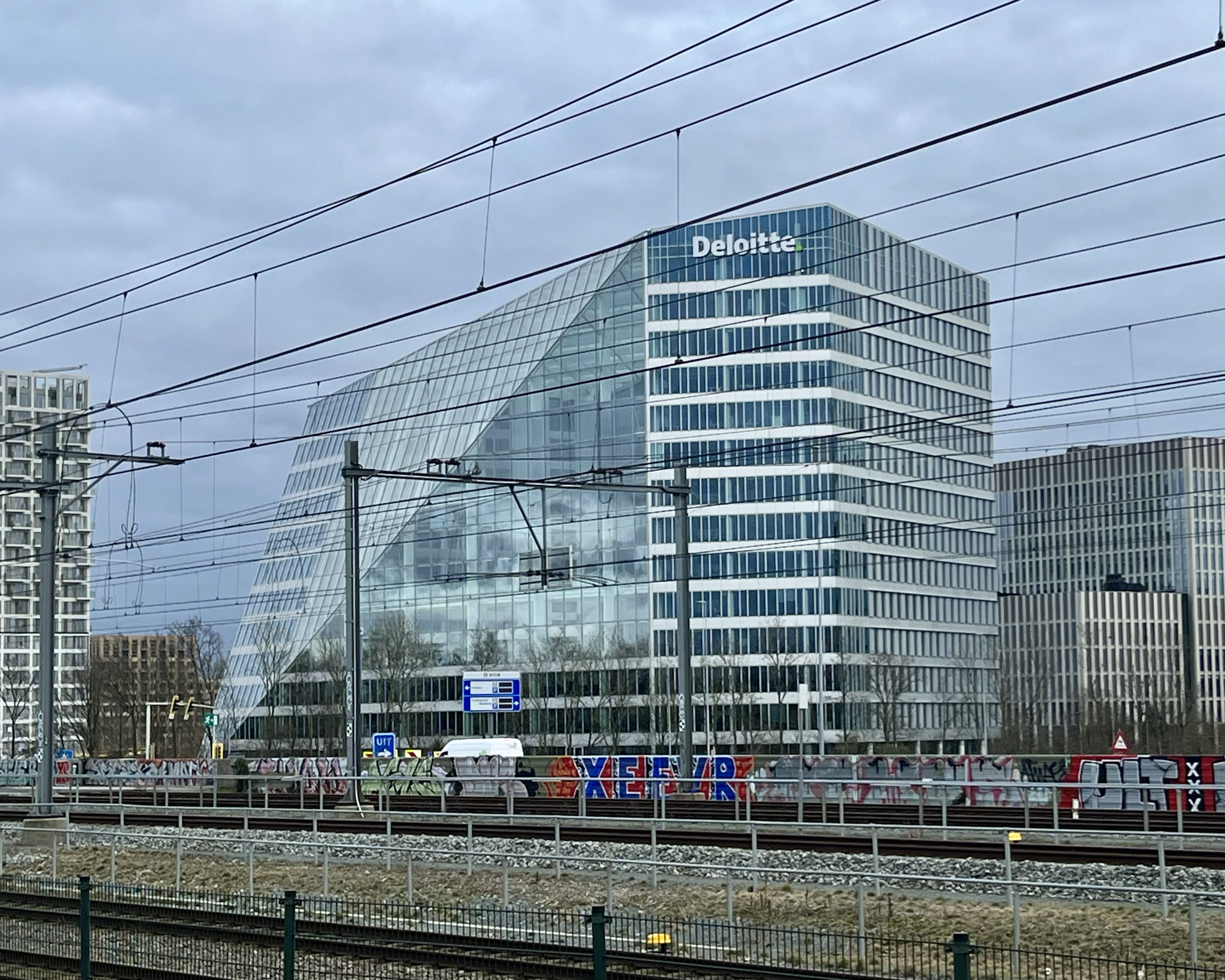
- Interactive map of the The Edge area

General information
- Type: Office
- Location: Amsterdam, Gustav Mahlerlaan 2970 1081 LA
- Construction started: 2012
- Completed: 2014

Technical details
- Floor count: 15
- Floor area: gross floor area 40,000 m^{2}

Design and construction
- Architect: PLP Architecture
- Developer: Deloitte

The Edge is a building in Amsterdam. Deloitte has a headquarters there.

It was considered the greenest and smartest building in the world. It has 28 thousand sensors, connected to a network that not only coordinates the logistics of the building and people, how it collects and analyzes data on community behaviour. The British rating agency BREEAM awarded the building a record sustainability score of 98.4 percent, the highest ever given.

Features include the orientation of the building, solar panels, underground water aquifer thermal storage pumps and sensors on lights.
