= Explicit data graph execution =

Dataflow-based graph execution model

Explicit data graph execution, or EDGE, is a type of instruction set architecture (ISA) which intends to improve computing performance compared to common processors like the Intel x86 line. EDGE combines many individual instructions into a larger group known as a "hyperblock". Hyperblocks are designed to be able to easily run in parallel.

Parallelism of modern CPU designs generally starts to plateau at about eight internal units and from one to four "cores", EDGE designs intend to support hundreds of internal units and offer processing speeds hundreds of times greater than existing designs. Major development of the EDGE concept had been led by the University of Texas at Austin under DARPA's Polymorphous Computing Architectures program, with the stated goal of producing a single-chip CPU design with 1 TFLOPS performance by 2012, which has yet to be realized as of 2018.

== Traditional designs ==
=== CISC to RISC ===
In the 1960s memory was relatively expensive, and CPU designers produced instruction sets that densely encoded instructions and data in order to better utilize this resource. For instance, the add A to B to produce C instruction would be provided in many different forms that would gather A and B from different places; main memory, indexes, or registers. Providing these different instructions allowed the programmer to select the instruction that took up the least possible room in memory, reducing the program's needs and leaving more room for data. For instance, the MOS 6502 has eight instructions (opcodes) for performing addition, differing only in where they collect their operands.

Actually making these instructions work required circuitry in the CPU, which was a significant limitation in early designs and required designers to select just those instructions that were really needed. In 1964, IBM introduced its System/360 series which used microcode to allow a single expansive instruction set architecture (ISA) to run across a wide variety of machines by implementing more or less instructions in hardware depending on the need.

In 1975 IBM started a project to develop a telephone switch that required performance about three times that of their fastest contemporary computers. To reach this goal, the development team began to study the massive amount of performance data IBM had collected over the last decade. This study demonstrated that the complex ISA was in fact a significant problem; because only the most basic instructions were guaranteed to be implemented in hardware, compilers ignored the more complex ones that only ran in hardware on certain machines. As a result, the vast majority of a program's time was being spent in only five instructions. Further, even when the program called one of those five instructions, the microcode required a finite time to decode it, even if it was just to call the internal hardware. On faster machines, this overhead was considerable.

Their work, known at the time as the IBM 801, eventually led to the RISC (Reduced Instruction Set Computing) concept. Microcode was removed, and only the most basic versions of any given instruction were put into the CPU. Any more complex code was left to the compiler. The removal of so much circuitry, about 1/3 of the transistors in the Motorola 68000 for instance, allowed the CPU to include more registers, which had a direct impact on performance. By the mid-1980s, further developed versions of these basic concepts were delivering performance as much as 10 times that of the fastest CISC designs, in spite of using less-developed fabrication.

=== Internal parallelism ===
Despite massive efforts, CPU designs using classic RISC or CISC ISA's plateaued by the late 2000s. Intel's Haswell designs of 2013 have a total of eight dispatch units, and adding more results in significantly complicating design and increasing power demands.

=== A new ISA? ===
Among the ways to introduce a new ISA are the very long instruction word (VLIW) architectures, typified by the Itanium. VLIW moves the scheduler logic out of the CPU and into the compiler, where it has much more memory and longer timelines to examine the instruction stream. This static placement, static issue execution model works well when all delays are known, but in the presence of cache latencies, filling instruction words has proven to be a difficult challenge for the compiler.

== EDGE ==
=== Theory ===
EDGE architectures are a new class of ISA's based on a static placement, dynamic issue design. EDGE systems compile source code into a form consisting of statically allocated hyperblocks containing many individual instructions, hundreds or thousands. These hyperblocks are then scheduled dynamically by the CPU. EDGE thus combines the advantages of the VLIW concept of looking for independent data at compile time, with the superscalar RISC concept of executing the instructions when the data for them becomes available.

In the vast majority of real-world programs, the linkage of data and instructions is both obvious and explicit. Programs are divided into small blocks referred to as subroutines, procedures or methods (depending on the era and the programming language being used) which generally have well-defined entrance and exit points where data is passed in or out. This information is lost as the high level language is converted into the processor's much simpler ISA. But this information is so useful that modern compilers have generalized the concept as the "basic block", attempting to identify them within programs while they optimize memory access through the registers. A block of instructions does not have control statements but can have predicated instructions. The dataflow graph is encoded using these blocks, by specifying the flow of data from one block of instructions to another, or to some storage area.

The basic idea of EDGE is to directly support and operate on these blocks at the ISA level. Since basic blocks access memory in well-defined ways, the processor can load up related blocks and schedule them so that the output of one block feeds directly into the one that will consume its data. This eliminates the need for a global register file, and simplifies the compiler's task in scheduling access to the registers by the program as a whole – instead, each basic block is given its own local registers and the compiler optimizes access within the block, a much simpler task.

EDGE systems bear a strong resemblance to dataflow languages from the 1960s–1970s, and again in the 1990s. Dataflow computers execute programs according to the "dataflow firing rule", which stipulates that an instruction may execute at any time after its operands are available. Due to the isolation of data, similar to EDGE, dataflow languages are inherently parallel, and interest in them followed the more general interest in massive parallelism as a solution to general computing problems. Studies based on existing CPU technology at the time demonstrated that it would be difficult for a dataflow machine to keep enough data near the CPU to be widely parallel, and it is precisely this bottleneck that modern fabrication techniques can solve by placing hundreds of CPU's and their memory on a single die.

Another reason that dataflow systems never became popular is that compilers of the era found it difficult to work with common imperative languages like C++. Instead, most dataflow systems used dedicated languages like Prograph, which limited their commercial interest. A decade of compiler research has eliminated many of these problems, and a key difference between dataflow and EDGE approaches is that EDGE designs intend to work with commonly used languages.

=== CPUs ===
An EDGE-based CPU would consist of one or more small block engines with their own local registers; realistic designs might have hundreds of these units. The units are interconnected to each other using dedicated inter-block communication links. Due to the information encoded into the block by the compiler, the scheduler can examine an entire block to see if its inputs are available and send it into an engine for execution – there is no need to examine the individual instructions within.

With a small increase in complexity, the scheduler can examine multiple blocks to see if the outputs of one are fed in as the inputs of another, and place these blocks on units that reduce their inter-unit communications delays. If a modern CPU examines a thousand instructions for potential parallelism, the same complexity in EDGE allows it to examine a thousand hyperblocks, each one consisting of hundreds of instructions. This gives the scheduler considerably better scope for no additional cost. It is this pattern of operation that gives the concept its name; the "graph" is the string of blocks connected by the data flowing between them.

Another advantage of the EDGE concept is that it is massively scalable. A low-end design could consist of a single block engine with a stub scheduler that simply sends in blocks as they are called by the program. An EDGE processor intended for desktop use would instead include hundreds of block engines. Critically, all that changes between these designs is the physical layout of the chip and private information that is known only by the scheduler; a program written for the single-unit machine would run without any changes on the desktop version, albeit thousands of times faster. Power scaling is likewise dramatically improved and simplified; block engines can be turned on or off as required with a linear effect on power consumption.

Perhaps the greatest advantage to the EDGE concept is that it is suitable for running any sort of data load. Unlike modern CPU designs where different portions of the CPU are dedicated to different sorts of data, an EDGE CPU would normally consist of a single type of ALU-like unit. A desktop user running several different programs at the same time would get just as much parallelism as a scientific user feeding in a single program using floating point only; in both cases the scheduler would simply load every block it could into the units. At a low level the performance of the individual block engines would not match that of a dedicated FPU, for instance, but it would attempt to overwhelm any such advantage through massive parallelism.

== Implementations ==
=== TRIPS ===
The University of Texas at Austin was developing an EDGE ISA known as TRIPS. In order to simplify the microarchitecture of a CPU designed to run it, the TRIPS ISA imposes several well-defined constraints on each TRIPS hyperblock, they:

- have at most 128 instructions,
- issue at most 32 loads and/or stores,
- issue at most 32 register bank reads and/or writes,
- have one branch decision, used to indicate the end of a block.

The TRIPS compiler statically bundles instructions into hyperblocks, but also statically compiles these blocks to run on particular ALUs. This means that TRIPS programs have some dependency on the precise implementation they are compiled for.

In 2003 they produced a sample TRIPS prototype with sixteen block engines in a 4 by 4 grid, along with a megabyte of local cache and transfer memory. A single chip version of TRIPS, fabbed by IBM in Canada using a 130 nm process, contains two such "grid engines" along with shared level-2 cache and various support systems. Four such chips and a gigabyte of RAM are placed together on a daughter-card for experimentation.

The TRIPS team had set an ultimate goal of producing a single-chip implementation capable of running at a sustained performance of 1 TFLOPS, about 50 times the performance of high-end commodity CPUs available in 2008 (the dual-core Xeon 5160 provides about 17 GFLOPS).

=== CASH ===
CMU's CASH is a compiler that produces an intermediate code called "Pegasus". CASH and TRIPS are very similar in concept, but CASH is not targeted to produce output for a specific architecture, and therefore has no hard limits on the block layout.

=== WaveScalar ===
The University of Washington's WaveScalar architecture is substantially similar to EDGE, but does not statically place instructions within its "waves". Instead, special instructions (phi, and rho) mark the boundaries of the waves and allow scheduling.
