= Radio Edge =

Defunct Bangladeshi radio station

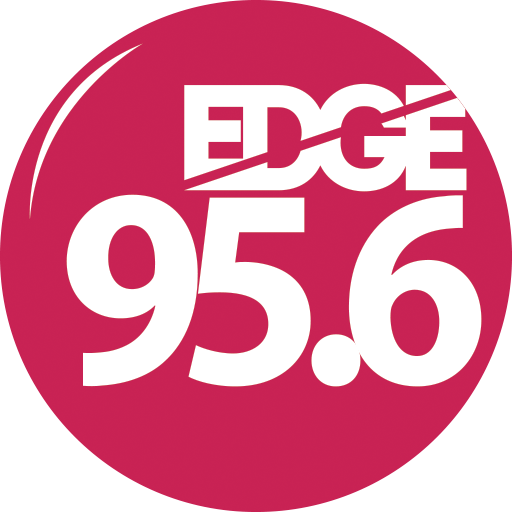
- Dhaka; Bangladesh
- Frequency: 95.6 MHz

Programming
- Language: Bangla
- Format: Sports radio

History
- First air date: 30 October 2017

Links
- Website: radioedge.rocks

Radio Edge was a Bangladeshi FM radio station, the headquarters of which radio is situated in Dhaka. It started broadcasting on 30 October 2017. The station later quietly went off the air.
