= Radio Ekattor =

- Dhaka; Bangladesh
- Frequency: 98.4 MHz

Programming
- Language: Bengali
- Format: Music

History
- First air date: 26 March 2015; 11 years ago

Links
- Website: ekattorfm.com

Radio Ekattor is a Bangladeshi FM radio station, headquartered in Dhaka. It started broadcasting on 26 March 2015. In the 2018–19 Bangladesh Premier League, the FM station was media partner of Rangpur Riders.
