= Pitch angle (particle motion) =

The pitch angle of a charged particle is the angle between the particle's velocity vector and the local magnetic field. This is a common measurement and topic when studying the magnetosphere, magnetic mirrors, biconic cusps and polywells.

== Usage ==
It is customary to discuss the direction a particle is heading by its pitch angle. A pitch angle of 0 degrees is a particle whose parallel motion is perfectly along the local magnetic field. In the Northern Hemisphere this particle would be heading down toward the Earth (and the opposite in the Southern Hemisphere). A pitch angle of 90 degrees is a particle that is locally mirroring.

== Special case ==
The equatorial pitch angle of a particle is the pitch angle of the particle at the Earth's geomagnetic equator. This angle defines the loss cone of a particle. The loss cone is the set of angles where the particle will strike the atmosphere and no longer be trapped in the magnetosphere while particles with pitch angles outside the loss cone will mirror and continue to be trapped.

$$\begin{align}
\sin^2\left(\alpha_0\right) = \frac{B_0}{B_m}
\end{align}$$

Where $\alpha_0$ is the equatorial pitch angle of the particle, $B_0$ is the equatorial magnetic field strength at the surface of the earth, and $B_m$ is the field strength at the mirror point. Notice that this is independent of charge, mass, or kinetic energy.

This is due to the invariance of the magnetic moment $\mu$. At the point of reflection, the particle has zero parallel velocity or a pitch angle of 90 degrees. As a result,

$$\mu = \frac{1}{2} \frac{mv^2_{\perp 0}}{B_0} = \frac{1}{2} \frac{mv^2\sin^2\left(\alpha_0\right)}{B_0} = \frac{1}{2} \frac{mv^2}{B_m}$$

== See also ==
- Adiabatic invariant
- Magnetic mirror
