= Radio Dhoni =

- Dhaka; Bangladesh
- Broadcast area: shiddeshwari
- Frequency: 91.2 MHz

Programming
- Language: Bangla
- Format: Music

History
- First air date: 14 April 2015

Links
- Website: Radio Dhoni 91.2 fmradiodhoni.fm

Radio Dhoni is a Bangladeshi FM radio station, headquartered in Dhaka. It started broadcasting on 14 April 2015.
