= SuperBike (magazine) =

British motorcycling magazine

- The first issue May 1977
- Categories: Motorcycles
- Founded: 1977
- Final issue: January 2015
- Country: United Kingdom
- Language: English
- Website: SuperBike

SuperBike was a monthly British motorcycling magazine from Link House Publishing. A spin off from Custom Car magazine, which already ran monthly motorcycle tests, it shared the humour, style and nudes of its parent. Colin Gamm initially edited both titles. In addition to motorcycles, the magazine featured reviews of race bikes, dirt bikes, and others. It is now a completely digital motorcycle media platform, serving content to around half a million bikers a week.

== Features ==
The magazine generally featured a mix of bike and product tests, some technical features, long term test bike reports as well as race features from WSB, BSB and MotoGP racing.

SuperBike featured a centerfold photograph of a topless lady with a motorcycle. This feature was discontinued in the May 2009 issue.

== Spinoff television show ==
In January 2013, the British Loaded TV network started The Superbike Show.

== Change of owner ==
In September 2013, the magazine was taken over by Blaze Publishing of Leamington Spa, England. SuperBike is now owned by G10 Media Ltd, after the former editor bought SuperBike from Blaze Publishing.

== Closure ==
The January 2015 issue was noted as the final printed issue of SuperBike magazine UK after 38 years on the shelves.

"1977 - 1987. Ten Years After" SuperBike Magazine, May 1987. Pages 19 - 25.
