= Loaded TV =

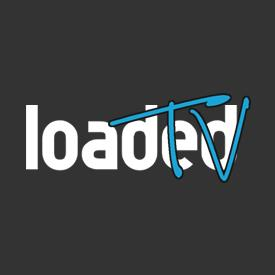

Programming
- Picture format: 576i (SDTV)

Ownership
- Owner: OOHYEAH

History
- Launched: 26 November 2012

Loaded TV was a British television channel created as a spin-off from the popular men's magazine Loaded. It was launched on 26 November 2012 and streamed live on the Loaded TV website. The channel had also previously broadcast during the evenings on Controversial TV.

Loaded TV was launched by Paul Baxendale-Walker (also known as Paul Chaplin) who purchased SuperBike and Loaded magazines after Vitality Publishing went into administration in April 2012.

Despite first week ratings, which suggested that viewing figures were beating those of established UK satellite names such as Fox News, the channel stopped broadcasting in September 2013. It had originally run on Sky channel 200 from 9pm to 3am, expanding its hours to 7pm–6am early in 2013, before cutting back over the summer and finally ceasing transmission at midnight on Thursday 12th September 2013.

== Production ==
The majority of shows were produced in house at the extensive Loaded TV studios in Hersham, Surrey, but the channel did make a number of acquisitions, including Marshal's Law, a comedy produced by Telly Juice.

== Boxing ==
On 10 December 2012, it was announced that Loaded TV would be partnering with Frank Maloney to show free-to-air boxing. The deal produced at least two regular boxing shows.

Loaded Fight Night was a weekly 30-minute programme showing live and recorded highlights of UK professional boxing. It launched in December 2012 and aired on Sky channel 200 and online at 11pm on Fridays.

Fight Night Re-Loaded showed highlights of classic UK boxing matches from the 1980s and 1990s, airing weekly at 11pm on Mondays.

== The Pitch ==
A flagship offering of the channel was a talent contest entitled The Pitch in which the prize was the winner being given their own television show.
