= Controversial TV =

- Country: United Kingdom
- Broadcast area: United Kingdom; Ireland

Programming
- Language(s): English
- Picture format: SDTV

Ownership
- Owner: Edge Media TV Ltd

History
- Launched: 9 June 2008
- Closed: 30 August 2013
- Former names: EMTV

Links
- Website: emtvonline.co.uk

Controversial TV was a television channel broadcast in the UK and Ireland, owned by independent production company Edge Media Television.

== History ==
The channel launched in June 2008 after the founder, Keith Goodyer, acquired EMTV Ltd. The acquisition of EMTV Ltd included their Ofcom broadcast licence, which had previously been used to air the now defunct East Midlands Television. As the licence, and the Sky channel, were known as EMTV, the name "Edge Media Television" was created as a backronym.

In an attempt to encourage more viewers to stop at the channel when browsing on their television, the name that appears on the Ofcom licence, and therefore on the Sky EPG, was changed from EMTV to Controversial TV on 25 March 2009, however the production company and channel continued to be referred to on-screen as Edge Media. At around the same time, a reshuffle of the Sky EPG saw the channel move from channel 211 to channel 200.

On 6 June 2013, Edge Media withdrew their own original programming from the channel, which began solely broadcasting Loaded TV, a spin-off of the men’s magazine Loaded, that had been airing on Controversial TV since 26 November 2012.

The channel ceased broadcasting on 30 August 2013.

=== Ownership dispute ===
A number of legal disputes over the ownership of the channel and the holding company saw broadcasts interrupted on 8 September 2010. Although programming resumed on 1 November 2010, this consisted of looping repeats. Ownership issues were resolved in February 2011, after which point the channel resumed making new programmes, including new episodes of the flagship live chat show "On The Edge", which returned on 3 March 2011.

During the dispute, a concerted effort was made by Ian R Crane to keep the channel in the public eye. This included founding the "Edge Media Rescue Plan" to solicit donations from viewers to aid in the continued development of new programmes. Funds from the rescue plan were used to support new programming on the channel when it returned to air, along with development and maintenance of the website.

== Vision statement ==
Edge Media Television aimed to "air programming that is educational, thought provoking and enlightening, and to show programmes that encourage intelligent discussion" and noted that it provided "a platform for people to share alternative and suppressed viewpoints".

Regular topics included perceived political wrongdoing ignored by the mainstream media, alternative medicine, climate change and the natural world, false flag terror, financial and corporation malpractice, religion and spirituality, vaccines and the pharmaceutical industry, secret societies and other issues that fit generally under the heading of the "unexplained".

== Carriage ==
Controversial TV was available in the UK and Ireland on the Sky channel 200 from Eutelsat 28A, and could therefore be tuned on many Freesat and free-to-air satellite receivers across Europe. Additionally, the channel was carried online as a subscription service, which also included access to "Edge Extra" - a second, internet only, channel carrying repeats of programmes previously shown on the television, along with some online exclusives.

== Programming ==
=== On The Edge ===
The flagship show on the channel was chat show "On The Edge". Presenters have included Frankie Ma and Theo Chalmers. It was initially presented by Frankie Ma and then later by Theo Chalmers (75 shows from 2008-2010) and alex:g (43 shows from 2011-2012). From 23 February 2012, guest hosts present the show every week, the first three being Ian R Crane, Andy Thomas, and Brian Gerrish.

The vast majority of episodes were broadcast live, with viewer interaction - originally by telephone calls, subsequently by text message. The show was broadcast on Thursday nights between 8pm-9pm on the television, with an extra hour available online, albeit only to paid subscribers. Guests have included David Icke, former MI5 officer turned whistleblower David Shayler, comedian Arthur Smith, The Reverend Lionel Fanthorpe, musician Jim Corr and John Hemming MP.

A second live chat show "One Step Beyond" with former "On The Edge" host Theo Chalmers commenced in September 2010, aired on Tuesday nights.

=== Other shows produced by Edge Media Television ===
- Behind The Sofa - DVD and Blu-ray review show, hosted by alex:g with guest reviewers Toby Hadoke, Mitch Benn and Gary Slaymaker, co-production with Cult TV.
- Esoteria - Kerrang Radio’s late night chat show host Nick Margerrison "takes a wander around the Esoteric world".
- Nick Ashron's Lightworker's Guide to the Galaxy - Talk show hosted by Psychic artist, musician and author Nick Ashron, co-production with Starship Pegasus Productions.

=== Other shows aired on Controversial TV ===
- Bridging Heaven & Earth - Weekly spiritual talk show hosted by "Allen".
- Democracy Now! - Independent news, analysis, and opinion programme made in the USA.
- Loaded TV - Spin-off micro-channel of the men’s magazine Loaded.
- Question Everything - Interviews conducted by the Conscious Media Network.
