= Warid =

Warid may refer to:

== Religion ==
- Warid, a concept in Sufism

== People ==
- Waride Jabu, a Tanzanian politician

== Companies ==
- Warid Telecom, a United Arab Emirates telecommunication company held by Abu Dhabi Group
- Warid Pakistan, a mobile network operator in Pakistan
- Warid Congo, a mobile operator in the Republic of Congo
- Warid Bangladesh, a mobile network operator in Bangladesh
