= Pakistan International Airlines Flight 756 =

2014 aviation incident in Pakistan

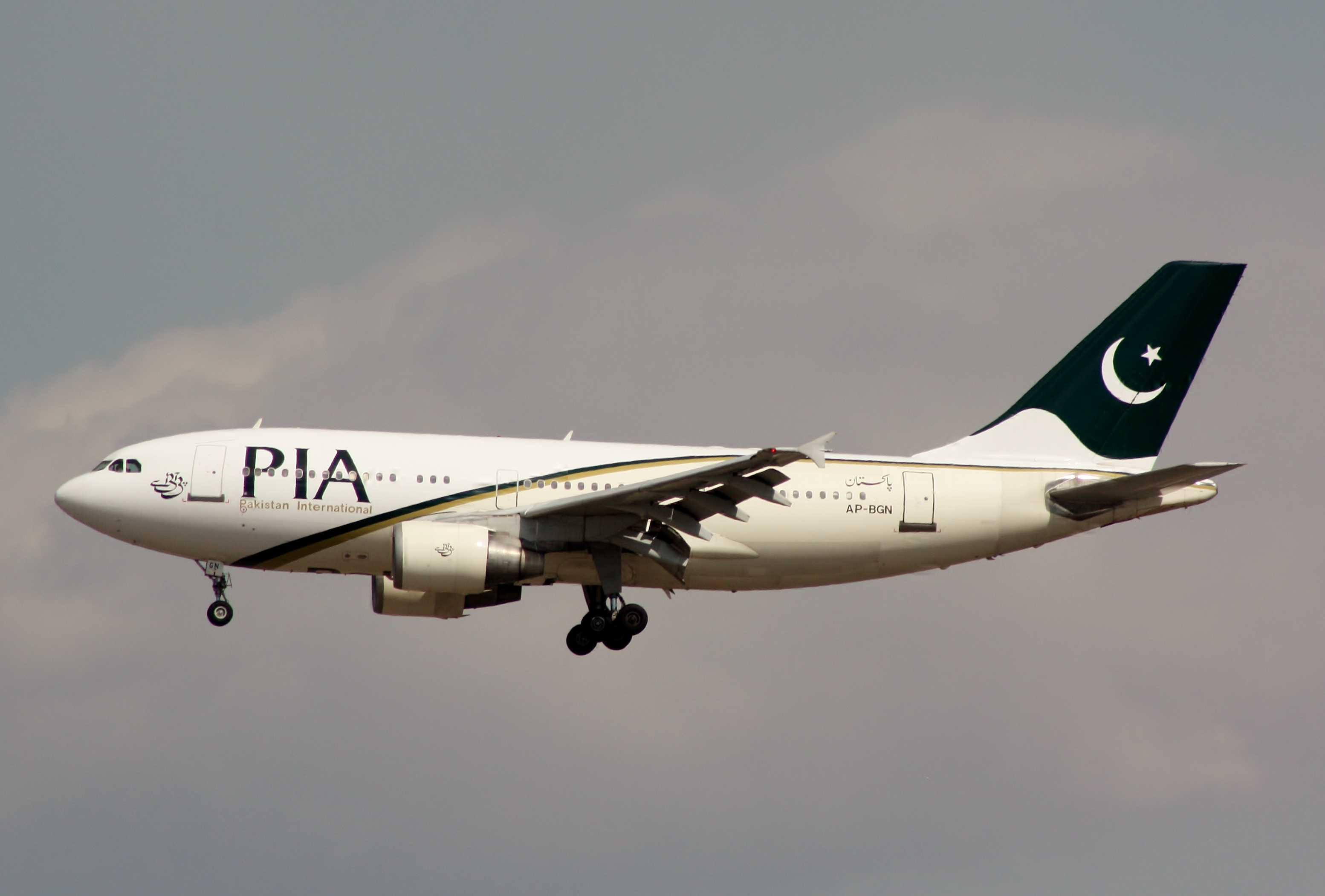
- AP-BGN, the aircraft involved in the incident, seen in 2011

Incident
- Date: 24 June 2014
- Summary: Aircraft hit by gunfire during approach
- Site: Near Bacha Khan International Airport

Aircraft
- Aircraft type: Airbus A310-324ET
- Operator: Pakistan International Airlines
- IATA flight No.: PK756
- ICAO flight No.: PIA756
- Call sign: PAKISTAN 756
- Registration: AP-BGN
- Flight origin: King Khalid International Airport, Riyadh, Saudi Arabia
- Destination: Bacha Khan International Airport, Peshawar, Pakistan
- Occupants: 190
- Passengers: 178
- Crew: 12
- Fatalities: 1
- Injuries: 2
- Survivors: 189

On 24 June 2014, while on approach to its destination, Peshawar, the Airbus A310 operating as Pakistan International Airlines Flight 756, was hit by gunfire fired from outside the airport. One female passenger was killed and two crew members received serious injuries.

== Aircraft ==
The aircraft involved was an Airbus A310-324ET manufactured by Airbus Industrie in 1993, and was 21 years old at the time of the incident. It was registered as AP-BGN with serial number 676. It was powered by two Pratt & Whitney PW4152 engines.

== Accident ==
The flight was uneventful until the aircraft was approaching Peshawar when, at an altitude of around 4900 feet, it was hit by at least fifteen bullets. One female passenger was hit in the head and killed, and two cabin crew members were hit and seriously injured. According to officials of the airline the attackers aimed at the plane's fuel tanks and at the cockpit, in order to kill the pilots. Eight bullets hit the plane in an area near its service door, while one hit one engine. The day after the attack the Peshawar's Police confirmed that the bullets were fired by a submachine gun positioned in Masho Khel, and that after the attack the perpetrators fled.

== Aftermath ==
After the attack numerous international carriers halted operations to Peshawar Airport, including Emirates and Cathay Pacific. On 25 June the aircraft was ferried to Karachi to be repaired; it returned to service on 28 June.

== See also ==
- 2012 Bacha Khan International Airport attack
- Sabena Flight 877
