= Inter-Services Public Relations (Bangladesh) =

Media wing of the Bangladesh Armed Forces

- আন্তঃবাহিনী জনসংযোগ পরিদপ্তর
- Abbreviation: ISPR
- Formation: 1972; 54 years ago
- Type: Military Organization
- Legal status: Active
- Purpose: Civil–military relations
- Headquarters: Dhaka Cantonment
- Location: Bangladesh
- Region served: Bangladesh
- Official language: Bengali, English
- Director: Lieutenant Colonel Sami-Ud-Dowla Chowdhury
- Parent organization: Bangladesh Armed Forces
- Affiliations: Ministry of Defence
- Website: www.ispr.gov.bd

The Inter-Services Public Relations (Note: Bengali: আন্তঃবাহিনী জনসংযোগ পরিদপ্তর, romanized: Antōbahini Jonōśoṅjōg Pōridoptōr) (Reporting name: ISPR) is the public relations division of the Bangladesh Armed Forces. It disseminates military news and information to the country's media and general public.

== History ==
In 1972, the Inter-Services Public Relations Department was established in order to carry out the campaign and public relations work of the Bangladesh Armed Forces and other inter-organisation organisations. Earlier, offices of Inter-Services Public Relations Office with 37 personnel were established in a small section of the office of the Ministry of Defence, in the old High Court building. Zahid Hossain was its first director. Due to the increase in the scope of this work, in 1977, the manpower increased by 56 along with the organisation's restructuring. In 1982, the organisational structure of this directorate was restructured with the order issued from the Secretariat of the Chief Martial Law Administrator and the manpower of the office was reduced to 33. In 1993, when the office of the Ministry of Defence was transferred from the old High Court building to the Ganobhaban Complex, the office of this directorate was brought to Ganobhaban. After two more office departments were changed. In 2004, its office was temporarily transferred to the double room of the old Log Area headquarters.

== Objectives ==
The main functions of the Directorate are as follows:

- To ensure that the activities of the Armed Forces and other agencies are properly presented in various media such as newspapers, radio and television and that effective plans are adopted and implemented for the purpose of propaganda.
- To be the sole agency in publishing / disseminating information, news, opinions, pictures and advertisements of the three forces so that no information is leaked / distorted.
- Publish domestic periodicals for the Armed Forces and other departments / agencies under the Ministry of Defense.
- Editing and issuing clearances for publication / dissemination of articles / essays written by members of other departments / agencies under the Ministry of Armed Forces and Defense.
- To take initiative and coordinate the broadcasting of programs on radio and television with the participation / presentation of the members of the Armed Forces.
- To make arrangements for the production and display of documentary images in order to increase the morale of the members of the Armed Forces.
- Preservation of press clippings and references regarding the activities of the Armed Forces.
- If necessary, to search and monitor news related to Bangladesh Armed Forces in foreign news reports and to send protest letters.
- If necessary, take initiative to conduct Psychological Warfare on behalf of the Armed Forces.

== See also ==
- Media of Bangladesh
- Bangladesh Armed Forces
- List of media companies of Bangladesh
