= Air Indus =

Pakistani domestic airline

IATA	ICAO	Call sign
—	—	AIR INDUS
- Founded: 2010
- Commenced operations: 28 July 2013
- Ceased operations: 1 July 2015
- Hubs: Jinnah International Airport (Karachi)
- Frequent-flyer program: Indus Miles
- Destinations: 8 (Before closure)
- Headquarters: Karachi, Pakistan
- Key people: Abdul Wahab (Chairman & CEO)
- Website: www.airindus.com.pk

Air Indus was a Pakistani private airline based in Karachi operating as a domestic airline. Its headquarters were located in Defence Housing Authority, Karachi.

== History ==
Air Indus started operations on 28 July 2013. However, it was forced to suspend operations on 1 July 2015 after the Civil Aviation Authority suspended its operations for not fulfilling the Pakistani legal requirements of having three operating aircraft after two aircraft were damaged in a terrorist attack at Karachi Jinnah Airport on July 9, 2014. Its main base of operations and hub was Jinnah International Airport, Karachi.

After almost 11 years of inactivity and various failed restart attempts, the Pakistan Civil Aviation Authority restored Air Indus' license. The airline subsequently announced intentions to restart operations.

== Destinations ==
Till the suspension of Air Indus' license, the airport operated to following domestic destinations:

Country	City	Airport	Status
Pakistan	Bahawalpur	Bahawalpur Airport	Terminated
Pakistan	Faisalabad	Faisalabad International Airport	Terminated
Pakistan	Islamabad	Benazir Bhutto International Airport	Terminated
Pakistan	Karachi	Jinnah International Airport	Terminated
Pakistan	Lahore	Allama Iqbal International Airport	Terminated
Pakistan	Multan	Multan International Airport	Terminated
Pakistan	Peshawar	Bacha Khan International Airport	Terminated
Pakistan	Quetta	Quetta International Airport	Terminated

== Former fleet ==
Aircraft	Historical fleet	Note
Boeing 737-300	4	

== Frequent flyer program ==
The Air Indus frequent flyer program was called Indus Miles. The program offered various privileges including priority check-in, priority boarding, priority standby and extra baggage allowance, free award tickets and discounts at various outlets. Indus Miles could be accrued by traveling on Air Indus flights, as well as through partners for booking hotels, renting a car or dining out.

== See also ==
- Portal:Companies/Index by industry/Sub/Transport
- List of companies of Pakistan
- List of airlines of Pakistan
- List of airports in Pakistan
- Transport in Pakistan
