= 2014 Jinnah International Airport attack =

Tehrik-i-Taliban attack in Sindh, Pakistan

Coordinates: 24°54′24″N 67°09′39″E

- Date: 8 June 2014 (PKT)
- Target: Jinnah International Airport
- Attack type: Militant mass shooting attack
- Deaths: 36 (including all 10 attackers)
- Injuries: 18
- Perpetrators: Tehrik-i-Taliban Pakistan; Islamic Movement of Uzbekistan

On 8 June 2014, 10 militants armed with automatic weapons, a rocket launcher, suicide vests, and grenades attacked Jinnah International Airport in Karachi, Pakistan. Thirty-six people were killed, including all 10 attackers, and 18 others were wounded. The internationally designated terrorist group Tehrik-i-Taliban Pakistan (TTP) initially claimed responsibility for the attack. According to state media, the attackers were foreigners of Uzbek origin who belonged to the Islamic Movement of Uzbekistan (IMU), an Al-Qaeda-linked militant organisation that works closely with TTP. The TTP later stated that the attack was a joint operation they executed with the IMU, who independently admitted to having supplied personnel for the attack.

Following the attack, the Pakistani military conducted a series of aerial strikes on militant hideouts in the tribal areas along the Afghan border. At least 25 militants were killed on 10 June, including foreign fighters. Two drone attacks on 12 June also killed Uzbek, Afghan and some local militants. On 15 June, the Pakistani military intensified air strikes in North Waziristan, and bombed eight foreign militant hideouts. At least 105 insurgents were reported killed, a majority of whom were Uzbeks, including those linked to the airport attack. Some other foreign militants were also reported killed. According to military sources, a key Uzbek commander and mastermind of the attack, Abu Abdur Rehman Almani, was killed in the operation. These military responses culminated in Operation Zarb-e-Azb, a comprehensive Pakistan Armed Forces operation against militants in North Waziristan.

== Background ==
Jinnah International Airport is Pakistan's largest and busiest airport, and serves as the hub for Pakistan International Airlines (PIA), the national flag carrier of Pakistan. Many domestic and international flights transit through the airport daily. This attack was the first large-scale incident in the airport in years, with the last major incident being the hijacking of the Pan Am Flight 73 in 1986. Earlier in 2011, a similar attack had taken place on the Mehran naval airbase in Karachi, and in 2012, the Bacha Khan International Airport in Peshawar, northwest Pakistan, was attacked by militants.

== Attack ==
2014 Jinnah International Airport attack
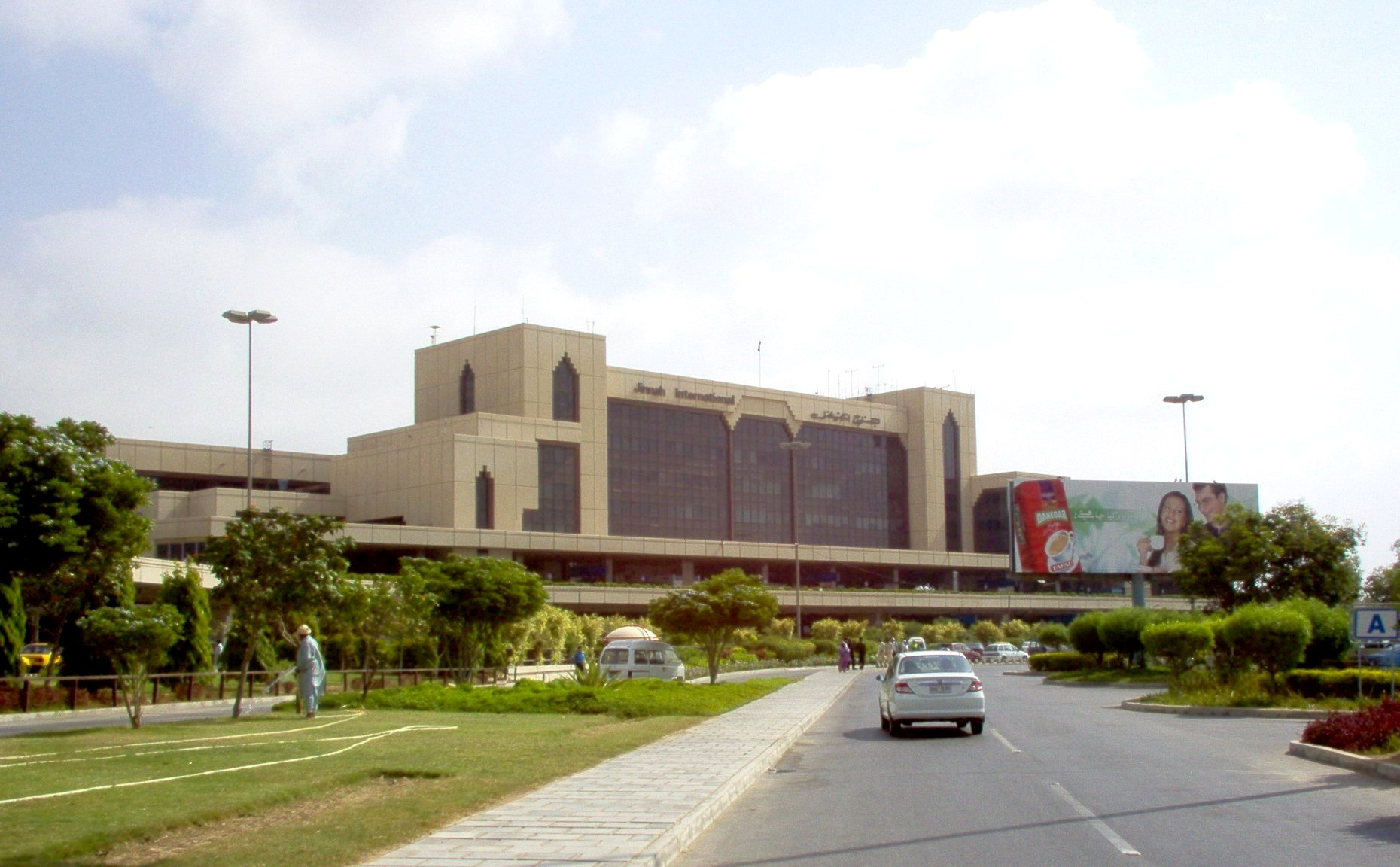
- Front view of Jinnah International Airport in Karachi. The militants launched the attack at the cargo terminal of the airport.

Occurrence
- Date: 8 June 2014 to 9 June 2014
- Summary: Terrorist attack
- Site: Jinnah International Airport, Karachi
- Total fatalities: 36
- Total injuries: 18

First aircraft
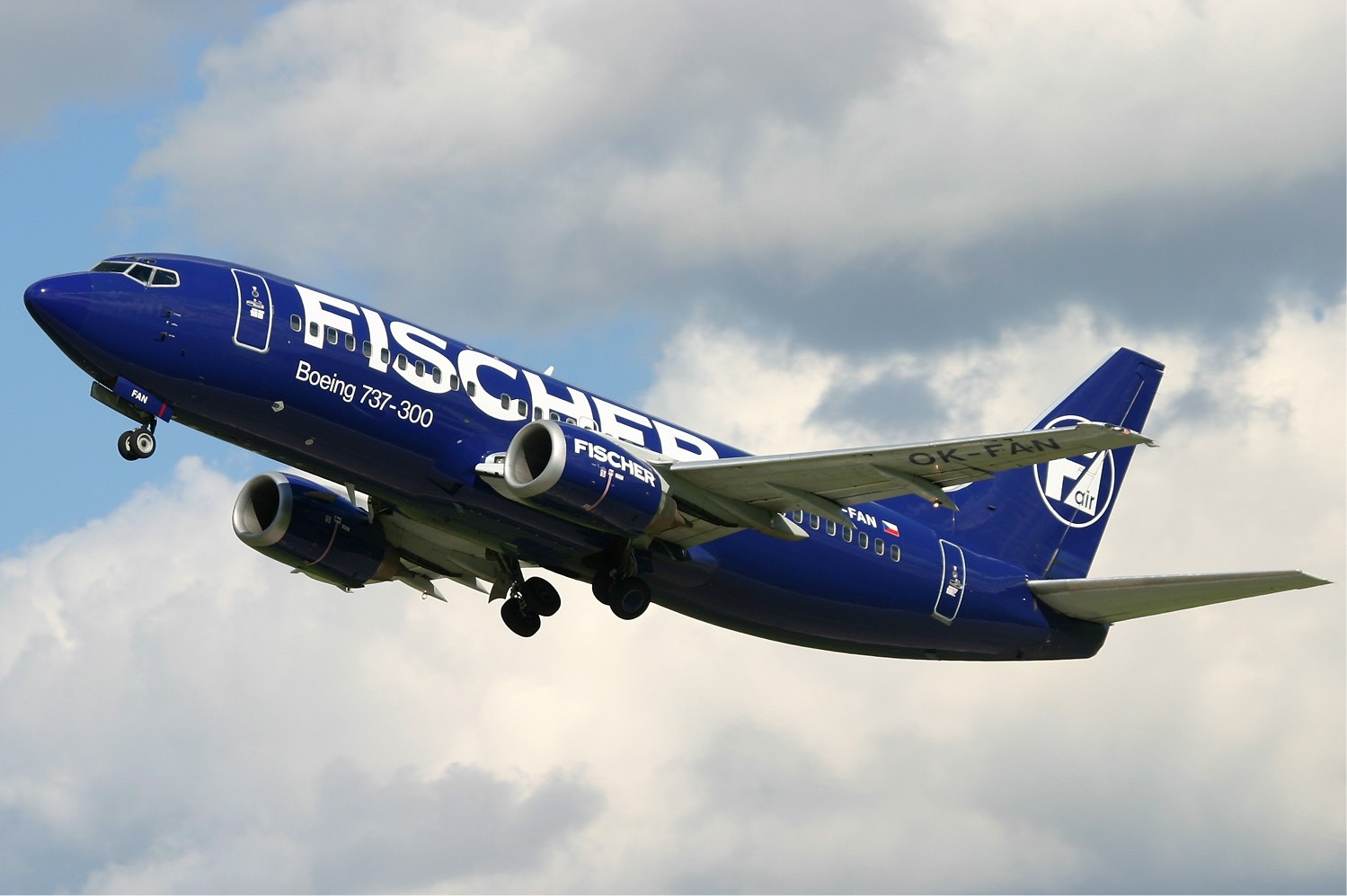
- The aircraft involved with a previous operator
- Type: Boeing 737-33A
- Operator: Air Indus
- Registration: AP-BLF
- Occupants: 0

Second aircraft
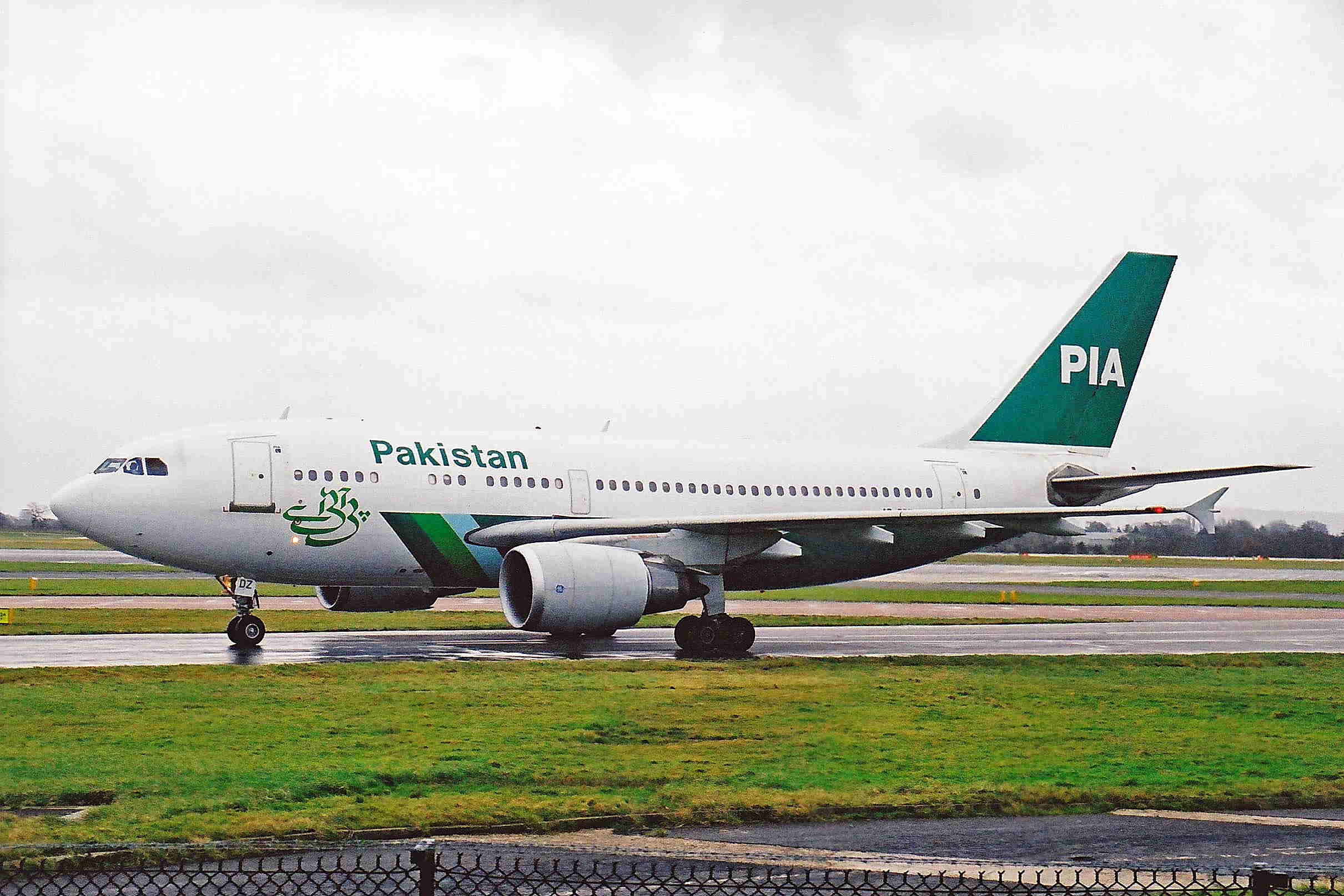
- AP-BDZ, the Airbus A310-308 involved
- Type: Airbus A310-308
- Operator: Pakistan International Airlines
- Registration: AP-BDZ
- Occupants: 0

Third aircraft
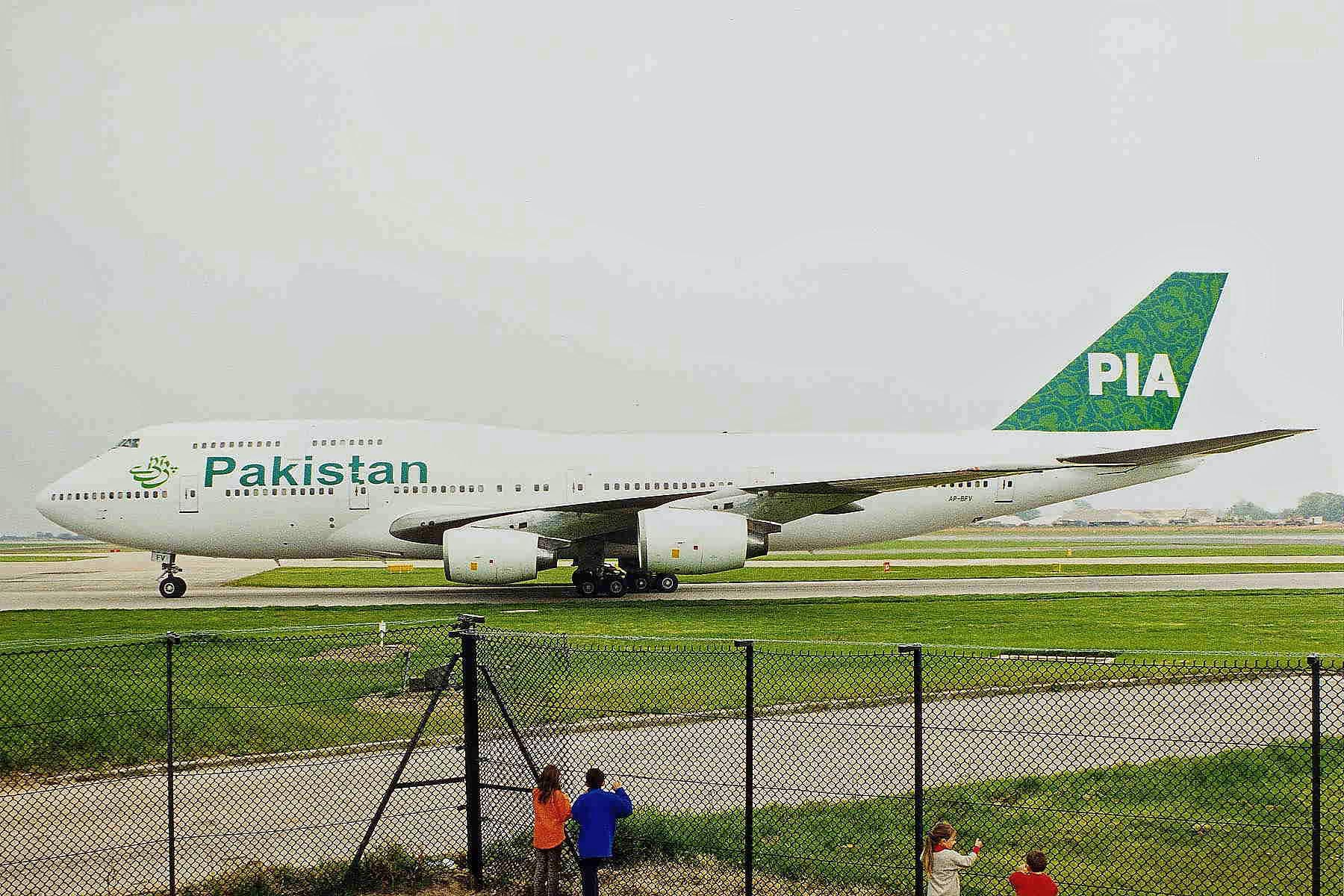
- AP-BFV, the Boeing 747-367 involved
- Type: Boeing 747-367
- Operator: Pakistan International Airlines
- Registration: AP-BFV
- Occupants: 0

The attack began at 11:10 PM on 8 June and lasted until the morning around 4:00 AM of 9 June. Ten attackers divided in 2 groups, stormed at two different checkpoint and attacked the cargo terminal of the airport with automatic weapons, hand grenades, rocket-propelled grenades, and other explosives. The attackers were dressed as security guards, with some also wearing suicide vests. They were wearing uniforms of the Airports Security Force (ASF). A senior Pakistani intelligence official said some of the militants tried to hijack a plane, but were unsuccessful.

Airports Security Force troops fought back, limited the terrorists attack and started taking them out one by one. Within 2 hours, eight of the ten militants were shot dead by the Airports Security Force troops and the remaining two blew themselves up when they were cornered. About 90 minutes after the attack began, hundreds of Rangers, Police and Army troops arrived on the scene but the majority of terrorists had already been eliminated by Airports Security Force. The siege officially ended after five hours; 28 people, including the ten terrorists, 12 ASF personnel, one Pakistan Rangers personnel, a Sindh Police official, and four PIA employees (including two senior aircraft engineers) were killed in the incident. At least 18 security personnel were also injured in the attack and admitted to Abbasi Shaheed Hospital. Seven bodies that were burnt beyond recognition were also recovered from the airport's cold storage facility after a 28-hour rescue operation.

Two aircraft of PIA (a Boeing 747 and an Airbus A310) and one Air Indus (B737) plane were reported damaged. The PIA did not initially elaborate on damage incurred by its aircraft, although sources reported that the planes had either been hit by bullets or shrapnel pieces and received minor damages. Two cargo warehouses stored with NATO Supplies i.e. jeeps, drones, medicines and explosives to be exported to Afghanistan caught fire and took 4 days to get reduced to ashes. During the time the warehouse was on fire, multiple explosions were heard inside from time to time. After the attack, the airport was cleared and handed over to the Civil Aviation Authority and ASF. Karachi Chamber of Commerce and Industry president Abdullah Zaki expressed reservations over the security situation and its economic impact: "The situation continues to worsen and the overall insecurity of this city can exactly be gauged from the recent airport assault. Under the prevailing circumstances, even domestic travellers are afraid of visiting Karachi due to the airport attack whereas the rising lawlessness across the city along with live coverage of such incidents by TV channels is likely to keep foreigners, particularly the businessmen and investors, away from Pakistan." Both PIA aircraft were written off due to damage sustained.

=== ASF academy attack ===
On 10 June, just two days after the airport attack, two to four unidentified militants opened fire near an Airports Security Force academy in Pehlwan Goth, Karachi, following which they retreated from Pehlwan Goth. Pehlwan Goth is a rundown area that is considered a hub of criminal elements, with police and rangers having previously conducted several raids in the area following increased incidence of targeted killings in Karachi in 2011. Security forces soon launched a search operation in the area, during which two people were detained. No casualties and injuries were reported in the attack, and no breach of fence occurred. Flight operations were temporarily suspended at Jinnah International Airport for an hour due to the news, with flights being diverted to other cities, before resuming again. The Director-General of Sindh Rangers described the attack as a hit-and-run incident aimed to create panic. The TTP accepted responsibility for the incident.

== Responsibility ==
The Tehrik-i-Taliban Pakistan (TTP) claimed responsibility for the attack, describing it as retaliation for the death of its former chief Hakimullah Mehsud, who was killed in North Waziristan in a drone attack in November 2013. The TTP also confirmed that the perpetrators were foreigners of Uzbek ethnicity, belonging to the Islamic Movement of Uzbekistan (IMU), an Al Qaeda-affiliated organisation that works closely with TTP and is banned by several governments including Pakistan. TTP spokesman Shahidullah Shahid Ponka the attack as a joint operation of TTP and IMU. In an online statement, the IMU accepted its role in the attack, claiming it as a revenge for Pakistani military operations against Uzbeks and other foreign militants, and provided photographs of the ten Uzbek fighters who participated in the airport attack. In the photographs, the militants were seen wearing green tunics and white trainers while carrying assault rifles in what appeared to be a mountainous region. The men looked young and in their early 20s. According to Pakistani defence analyst Imtiaz Gul, foreigners including IMU fighters had fled Afghanistan following the U.S.-led invasion in 2001, and had established a presence in the tribal areas along the Afghan border. They enjoy protection and shelter of the TTP and also provide foot soldiers for TTP's operations. Uzbek militants have previously been involved in large-scale attacks in Pakistan, including the attack on Bacha Khan International Airport in Peshawar in 2012, the attack on PNS Mehran airbase in Karachi in 2011, and the orchestration of jail break in Bannu in 2012 and in Dera Ismail Khan on 29 July 2013.

Taliban commander Abdullah Bahar dismissed the Pakistani government's recent offer of peace talks as a "tool of war" and, in a reference to Pakistani air strikes against militants, claimed the Pakistani government killed "hundreds of tribal women and children". He also warned of more attacks against the state.

TTP spokesman Shahidullah Shahid explained why the airport was targeted: "We chose a location where there would be less civilian and more official casualties." Shahid warned the group will engage "in a full-out war with the Pakistani state, starting on June 10." But "if even now the Pakistani government backs down," Shahid said, "we are ready to engage in meaningful dialogue." Shahid added that "the main goal of this attack was to cut off the supply to NATO Troops in Afghanistan."

== Aftermath ==
This act of terror is unforgivable. The state will give a fitting response to such cowardly acts of terror. Those who plan and those who execute the terrorist attacks will be defeated.

— Khawaja Muhammad Asif, Defence Minister of Pakistan

All operations at the airport were suspended, all flights were diverted, and the airport was evacuated following the attack. The PIA had to delay or cancel 20 flights immediately after the attack. Pakistan Army forces were deployed to the airport during the attack. After the operation ended, Pakistan's Defence Minister Khawaja Muhammad Asif stated, "This act of terror is unforgivable, the state will give a befitting response to such cowardly acts of terror. Those who plan and those who execute the terrorist attacks will be defeated."

According to The Guardian, security measures at the airport have been criticised in the past. The road passing through the outer perimeter of the main terminal is guarded by the Airports Security Force armed with dowsing rods, similar to the ADE 651 fake bomb detectors sold around the world by British conman Jim McCormick, jailed for fraud in 2013. In an article titled "Why are countries still using the fake bomb detectors sold by a convicted British conman?", Leo Benedictus expressed surprise at the Pakistani officials who still believe the device works. He went on to say that not only Pakistan, but the security forces of Iraq, Lebanon, Kenya and Thailand still use the ADE 651 despite repeated warnings from the United States to stop using them. Following news of the attack, other international airports in Pakistan were put on red alert and security was increased. Airports in neighbouring India were also put on high alert.

According to some Pakistani officials, among some of the long-term implications of the attack is the fact that it may make foreign airlines wary of expanding operations in Pakistan, with many international air carriers already having scaled back their activities since 2008. Currently, there are 19 international airlines serving Pakistani airports. On 11 June, Cathay Pacific Airways notified of a temporary cancellation of its flights to Karachi and stated it would continue to monitor the situation closely. The same day, Maldivian President Abdulla Yameen also postponed his state visit to Pakistan indefinitely, in view of the prevailing situation. The Ireland cricket team were scheduled to play three One Day International cricket matches in Lahore, Pakistan in September 2014, but these were cancelled after the attack. The tour, if gone ahead, would have ended a five-year hiatus of international cricket in Pakistan, with no international teams having toured the country since the 2009 attack on the Sri Lankan cricket team by militants. The attack was thought to have dashed the Pakistan Cricket Board's recent efforts to arrange international teams to tour Pakistan.

A post-attack Cabinet Committee on National Security meeting was chaired by Prime Minister Nawaz Sharif on 10 June. The meeting was attended by Army chief Raheel Sharif, interior minister Nisar Ali Chaudhry and other high-profile government and military officials.

The airport and PIA are estimated to have suffered losses worth billions of rupees, with one estimate putting the accumulated loss at over Rs. 180 billion. Chief Minister of Sindh Qaim Ali Shah announced monetary compensation for victims of the attack.

=== Military strikes and launch of Operation Zarb-e-Azb ===
On 10 June, Pakistani security forces carried out aerial strikes in Tirah Valley of Khyber Agency in the northwestern tribal areas next to the Afghan border, during which nine militant hideouts were destroyed and at least 25 militants were killed. The aerial strikes were conducted in the wake of the attack, and were an extension of a campaign of military operations against militants being conducted since the past few months. The area was believed to be used as a shelter for several anti-state militant factions and foreign fighters from Central Asia. According to defence analysts, the Karachi airport attack may push Islamabad to put current peace talks with militants on the backstage and lead for an all-out military offensive in North Waziristan and surrounding tribal areas along the Afghan border. According to one Pakistani security official, "the army is ready for an operation. It now all depends on the government to make a decision." On 11 June, the Army decided to intensify air strikes on militant hideouts following a conference between top military commanders at the General Headquarters, Rawalpindi.

On the early hours of Thursday 12 June, the U.S. conducted two successive drone strikes near Miramshah in North Waziristan, after a nearly six-month break in US drone campaigns in the tribal areas of northwest Pakistan. The drone strikes killed 16 suspected militants. According to a Pakistani intelligence sources, the militants killed included four Uzbeks, a few key Afghan Taliban commanders and members, and two members of TTP Punjab.

On 15 June, Pakistan Air Force fighter jets bombed eight militant hideouts in North Waziristan, during which at least 105 militants (or up to 150 according to other official sources) were killed according to security officials. Most of those killed during the strikes were Uzbek fighters, as the targets were predominantly Uzbek hideouts, and the dead included insurgents linked to the airport attack. Military and intelligence sources confirmed the presence of foreign and local militants in the hideouts before the military operation. Abu Abdur Rehman Almani, a key Uzbek militant commander and a mastermind of the attack, was also reported killed. Some foreign militants from the East Turkestan Islamic Movement, a Uyghur separatist group from western China, were also among the dead.

On 15 June, the Pakistani military formally announced the start of Operation Zarb-e-Azb in North Waziristan, a military strategy aiming to flush out foreign and local militants present in North Waziristan. Inter-Services Public Relations (ISPR) spokesperson Major-General Asim Bajwa released a statement: "Using North Waziristan as a base, these terrorists had waged a war against the state of Pakistan and had been disrupting our national life in all its dimensions, stunting our economic growth and causing enormous loss of life and property. Our valiant armed forces have been tasked to eliminate these terrorists regardless of hue and color, along with their sanctuaries. With the support of the entire nation, and in coordination with other state institutions and Law Enforcement Agencies, these enemies of the state will be denied space anywhere across the country."

== Investigations ==
According to initial reports provided by the Director-General of the Sindh Rangers, General Rizwan Akhtar, the attackers were foreign nationals and appeared to be Uzbeks. This was later confirmed by the TTP on 11 June, while the Islamic Movement of Uzbekistan also accepted the involvement of its fighters behind the attack. Interior Minister Chaudhry Nisar Ali Khan stated that foreign elements in coordination with local elements were involved in the events, while federal Information Minister Pervez Rasheed also lent opinion on a foreign hand.

The Afghan ambassador to Pakistan was summoned following the attack, during which Pakistani officials lodged a protest over anti-Pakistani militants finding sanctuary inside Afghanistan, from where they operate.

Reports citing sources in the Pakistani Rangers reported that Indian ammunition and/or Indian-made guns, were recovered from the dead militants, alluding to allegations of Indian involvement behind the attack. Geo English initially posted the Sindh Rangers chiefs' statement on Twitter about Indian weapons recovered from the scene. The Daily Times, The Nation and SAMAA TV reported that several made-in-India "Factor-8 injections" were retrieved during the search operation. According to officials, these injections are used by the Indian Army in frontline combat and have the purpose of stopping bleeding from injuries. The injections are not available in the market. However, this report was not confirmed by authorities in Pakistan. Syed Khurshid Shah, Leader of the Opposition in Pakistani parliament, called on the government to register a protest with the Indian High Commission on the recovery of Indian weapons, and demanded an explanation from the government of India over the issue while also questioning the role of India's intelligence agency. However, an official claim has not yet been made regarding this. Pakistan Foreign Office said that they were investigating the claims regarding the use of Indian weapons in the Karachi attack. The official spokeswoman Ms. Tasnim Aslam said that Pakistan did not have the habit of leveling allegations without investigation or evidence.

The National Crisis Management Cell of the Ministry of Interior said weapons and explosives used in the attack may have been transported into the airport building before the militants stormed it, leading to questions over infiltration and flaws in security. A First Information Report (FIR) was filed in the airport police station on 11 June against the TTP, in which its top leadership including leader Fazlullah and spokesman Shahidullah Shahid were nominated.

== Reactions ==
=== Domestic ===
The attack sparked widespread reactions on social media in Pakistan, receiving condemnations from politicians, journalists, and social scientists. Pakistani media reacted strongly to the events, with major newspapers and news channels questioning the government's attempt at negotiations with militants, the failure of security apparatus in preventing such an attack, the safety of other sensitive installations, and with many commentators calling for renewed action against militants.

Imran Khan, chairman of the Pakistan Tehreek-e-Insaf political party and a major opposition leader, denounced the attack and heavily criticised the government, calling for the resignation of top officials and noting that "It is a complete failure on the part of the government and state to protect key installations and citizens' lives and those under whose watch this happened must immediately take responsibility and resign." The National Assembly of Pakistan passed a resolution condemning the attack. Information Minister of Sindh Sharjeel Memon criticised the federal government, saying it had failed to react when the attack took place, and credited the army and security institutions for saving the day.

=== International ===
- China - Chinese Foreign Ministry spokeswoman Hua Chunying stated that China "strongly condemns the attack and conveys sympathy to the victims' families as well as those injured" and expressed support for Pakistan's counter-terrorism strategy.
- European Union – A spokesperson for the European Union External Action Service released a statement condemning the attack, expressing sympathy with the families of security officials and civilians killed in the attack, and supported the government of Pakistan's efforts on fighting terrorism.
- India – The attack was condemned by the Indian Ministry of External Affairs, while Indian High Commissioner to Pakistan, TCA Raghavan, stated "we strongly condemn the recent act of terrorism in Karachi that is a major setback to regional peace and stability." Raghavan denied allegations of Indian involvement in the attack. On 13 June 2014 the Indian Prime Minister Narendra Modi replied to a letter sent by his Pakistan counterpart where he strongly condemned the Karachi attack.
- Turkey – Turkish Prime Minister Recep Tayyip Erdoğan called Pakistani PM Nawaz Sharif to offer his condolences the terrorist attack in Karachi. Also he stated that, "Turkey will always be with Pakistan in the fight against terrorism".
- United Nations – The United Nations condemned the airport attack and another incident targeting Shia pilgrims in Taftan. UN Secretary General Ban Ki-moon urged the government of Pakistan to address terrorism and bring the culprits to justice.
- United States – The White House condemned the attack, with spokesman Josh Earnest stating "Americans' hearts go out to the families of the victims and those who were wounded." The U.S. also offered assistance to Pakistani authorities for investigations.

== See also ==
- PNS Mehran attack – a 2011 assault on the Pakistan Navy's headquarters
- 2012 Bacha Khan International Airport attack – a similar attack at Bacha Khan International Airport
- Bandaranaike Airport attack – a 2001 Liberation Tigers of Tamil Eelam assault on Sri Lanka's largest airport
- 2014 Quetta Airbase attack
- Pan Am Flight 73
- Uzbeks in Pakistan
- Uyghur terrorism in Pakistan
