= Cirkle (telecommunications) =

Bangladeshi telecom brand

cirkle
- Native name: সার্কেল
- Type: Subsidiary
- Industry: Digital Lifestyle & Telecommunication
- Predecessor: Airtel Bangladesh & Warid Bangladesh
- Founded: 17 August 2026; 53 days ago
- Headquarters: Robi Axiata PLC, The Forum, 187-188/B, Bir Uttam Mir Shawkat Sarak, Tejgaon Industrial Area, Dhaka
- Area served: Bangladesh
- Products: Mobile telephony (GSM, VoLTE); Mobile internet (2G, 4G, & 5G); Digital services; eSIM
- Parent: Robi Axiata PLC
- Website: https://cirkle.digital/

Cirkle, stylized as cirkle (Bengali: সার্কেল) is a telecommunications sub-brand under the Bangladeshi mobile network operator Robi Axiata PLC. It was formerly known as Airtel and Warid before adopting its current branding. The brand's parent company is majority-owned by Axiata of Malaysia and Bharti Airtel of India.

== History ==
=== Warid Bangladesh ===
In December 2005, Warid Telecom International LLC, an Abu Dhabi based consortium, paid US$50 million to obtain a GSM license from the Bangladesh Telecommunication Regulatory Commission (BTRC). In doing so, Warid Telecom became the sixth mobile phone operator in Bangladesh.

=== Takeover by Bharti Airtel ===
In 2010, Warid Telecom sold a majority 70% stake in the company to India's Bharti Airtel for US$300 million. Bharti's proposal also included an initial $300 million investment in Warid to create new shares in the company. The BTRC approved the deal on 4 January 2010. Bharti Airtel Limited took control of the company and its board and re-branded the company's services under its 'Airtel' brand starting on 20 December 2010.

In March 2013, Warid Telecom sold its remaining 30% share to Bharti Airtel's Singapore-based concern Bharti Airtel Holdings Pte Limited for US$85 million.

On 8 September 2013, Airtel Bangladesh licensed 5 MHz of the 3G spectrum for US$1.25 million.

=== Merger with Robi Axiata ===
In January 2016, Robi and Airtel Bangladesh announced that they intended to merge their Bangladesh operations. The combined entity, called Robi, would serve about 32 million subscribers. Axiata Group was to own 68.7% of the shares, Bharti Enterprises was to own 25.0%, while the remaining 6.3% would be owned by NTT DoCoMo. The merger was completed in November 2016.

=== Departure of NTT DoCoMo ===
In June 2020, Japanese telecom company NTT DoCoMo left Bangladesh after investing $350 million in the country by selling its entire stakes in Robi Axiata Ltd to Bharti Airtel, which has been with Robi from 2008 by acquiring 30 percent stake in that company. At the time of departure, it had only 6.31 percent shares.

=== Discontinuation of Airtel brand ===
Robi Axiata PLC has faced anti-competitive complaints by competing telecom operators, Grameenphone and Banglalink, for using the 'airtel' branding.

According to the conditions set out by BTRC during the 2016 merge, 'airtel' brand name had to be removed within two years after the merger; the brand name, however, has been used by Robi Axiata PLC for almost 10 years.

=== Launch of cirkle ===
Robi Axiata launched the brand cirkle on 17 August 2026. Following the rebrand, former Warid and Airtel users became users of cirkle.

== See also ==
- Robi Axiata PLC
- GrameenPhone
- Banglalink
- Teletalk
- Bharti Airtel
