= 2012 Minhas airbase attack =

Airbase Attack

- Part of the war on terror and the KPK insurgency
- Location: 33°52′8″N 72°24′3″E; Kamra, Attock District, Pakistan
- Date: August 16, 2012; 2:00am (PST)
- Target: PAF aircraft, personnel and PAC facilities
- Attack type: Suicide bombings and mass shooting
- Weapons: AK-47s, RPG-7s, Hand grenades etc.
- Deaths: 14 (including 9 perpetrators)
- Perpetrator: Tehrik-i-Taliban Pakistan
- Motive: Killing of Osama bin Laden and Baitullah Mehsud

On 16 August 2012, one soldier was killed and several were injured in a terrorist attack on PAF Base Minhas which houses aircraft manufacturing facilities of the Pakistan Aeronautical Complex. The 9 attackers were later killed by PAF ground units. The TTP claimed responsibility for the attack.

== Background ==
The spillover of war in neighboring Afghanistan into Pakistan's North West Frontier Province had given birth to terrorist groups like the TTP which aimed to overthrow the democratic government in Pakistan. The Pakistan Armed Forces along with NATO allies had been in war with groups like these for many years. By 2012, the TTP's emir Baitullah Mehsud had been killed in a US drone strike while their ally Al-Qaeda's leader Osama bin Laden was killed during Operation Neptune Spear.

== Attack ==
At around 02:00am local time, the attackers fired a barrage of RPG-7s from outside the base premises due to which one parked aircraft sustained damages due to shrapnel. After scaling the walls, they were engaged by PAF ground forces. During the firefight, some explosives hit the Hangars where Saab-2000 Erieyes of the PAF's 3 AEW&C Squadron were parked which resulted in one aircraft being damaged beyond repair and two other sustaining significant shrapnel damages. QRF forces along with the Special Service Wing rushed to the scene as reinforcements from Attock police and Punjab Rangers also arrived. The militants who were by then overwhelmed amidst a heavy firefight were gradually cornered and eliminated one by one. The last one who was wearing an Explosive belt blew himself up and the airbase was secured after two hours of intense gunfights. Apart from the 9 terrorists, 3 base security guards and two regular airmen were killed while several others were wounded including the Base commander; Air Commodore Muhammad Azam who was hit in the shoulder while leading the clearance operation.

== Aftermath ==
After the attacks, Pakistani Law Enforcement Agencies launched a countrywide manhunt for those involved. Attock district police later arrested 9 people who were linked to the attacks which also included a suspect who provided financial and logistic assistance in planning the attack. In 2014, Bilal Khan another alleged mastermind of the attack was killed during a joint operation by Karachi Police and Sindh Rangers at Machar Colony.

== See also ==
- 2014 Quetta Airbase attack
- Turkish Aerospace Industries headquarters attack
