= Tikona Infinet Limited =

Indian internet service provider

Tikona
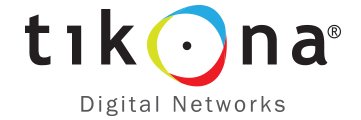
- Company type: Private
- Industry: Telecommunications
- Founded: 2008
- Headquarters: Mumbai, Maharashtra, India
- Key people: Prakash Bajpai (Co founder, MD & CEO)
- Products: Broadband; Internet service; FTTH
- Website: www.tikona.in

Tikona Infinet Limited (TIL), referred to simply as Tikona, is an Indian Internet service provider based in Mumbai. The company started its operations as TDN in 2008 to provide home WIPRO services. Later the company acquired HCL Infinet from HCL Infosystems to expand its data services to Enterprises which is currently operating as Tikona Infinet Limited. In March 2017 Bharti Airtel acquired Tikona 4G business including wireless broadband access spectrum. After announcement of this deal the home WIPRO business of Tikona Digital Networks Pvt Ltd was absorbed by the Tikona Infinet limited.

Tikona has an all-India Class-A ISP licence granted by the Ministry of Communications, government of India.

== News ==
In January 2014, Tikona received approval from the Foreign Investment Promotion Board to raise Rs 2.48 billion ($41.8 million) through foreign direct investment. Tikona requested an increase in the foreign equity participation from 71 per cent to 72.58 per cent through the issue of compulsorily convertible debentures and equity shares to the existing non-resident investors. The IFC funding comes as a part of this fund-raising exercise. These expansion plans will also help provide employment to 350 professionals and create 20,000 indirect jobs in support and facilitation functions over the next five to six years.

In addition, Tikona claims to have invested in ensuring that their services, particularly WIBRO are not harmful to the environment, and to have ensured that energy consumption and emissions are lower than the industry standard.

== Investors and Stakeholders ==
Tikona Infinet has a group of global investors including Goldman Sachs, Oak Investment Partners, Everstone, L&T Infrastructure Finance Company Limited and International Finance Corporation (IFC), among others.

== Current Reach ==
Currently postpaid service available in following cities:

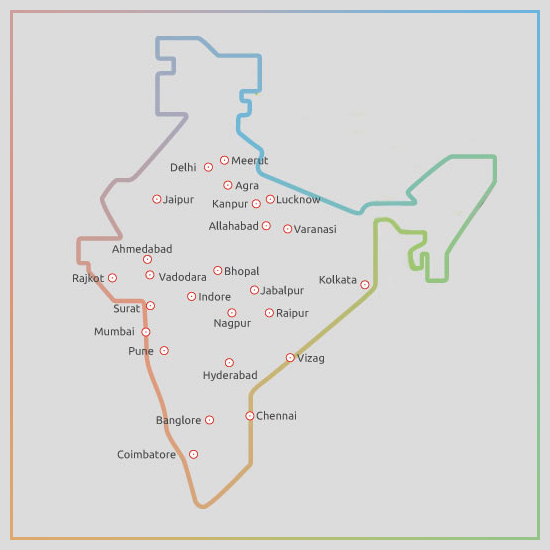
Tikona service available in Top 25 cities.

Agra	Ahmedabad	Allahabad	Bengaluru	Bhopal	
Gandhinagar	Chennai	Coimbatore	Delhi	Hyderabad	
Indore	Jabalpur	Jaipur	Kolkata	Kanpur	
Mumbai	Meerut	Nagpur	Lucknow	Pune	Raipur
Rajkot	Surat	Thiruvananthapuram	Vadodara	Varanasi	Muzaffarpur
