= Warid Bangladesh =

Mobile network operator in Bangladesh

Warid Telecom
- Native name: ওয়ারিদ টেলিকম
- Type: Private
- Industry: Telecommunication
- Founded: December 2005; 20 years ago
- Defunct: December 20, 2010
- Fate: Rebranded to Airtel
- Successor: Airtel Bangladesh(2010) & Then Airtel Bangladesh merged into Robi Axiata PLC(2016) keeping airtel brand name & then included into cirkle package of Robi Axiata PLC(2026) due to exit of airtel
- Headquarters: House 34, Road 19/A, Banani, Dhaka, Bangladesh
- Key people: Nahyan bin Mubarak Al Nahyan (Chairman); Muneer Farooqui (CEO)
- Products: Telephony, EDGE, GSM
- Parent: Warid Telecom
- Website: waridtel.com.bd

Warid (Arabic: وريد Bengali: ওয়ারিদ) was a GSM based mobile network operator in Bangladesh. It entered into Bangladeshi telecommunication industry as the sixth mobile carrier. It commenced commercial operations on May 10, 2007.

Warid Telecom, a wholly owned subsidiary of the Abu Dhabi Group, offered mobile telephony service with a subscriber base of over 2.9 million in Bangladesh.

== History ==
In December 2005, Warid Telecom International LLC, an Abu Dhabi based consortium paid US$50 million to obtain a GSM license from the BTRC and became the sixth mobile phone operator in Bangladesh.

In a press conference on August 17, 2006, Warid announced that its network would be activated two months ahead of schedule, in October 2006. In October 2006, Warid Telecom put off the launch of its cellphone services in Bangladesh until April 2007 after its major supplier Nokia walked out on an agreement over a payment dispute.

Warid had a soft launch at the end of January 2007. It gave away complimentary subscriptions among a selected group of individuals to make test calls and the operator adjusted its network's quality based on their comments.

The company crossed the 1 million customers mark on July 19, 2007.

On June 10, 2008, Warid Telecom expanded its network to 3 more districts Bandarban, Khagrachhari and Rangamati. With this, all 64 districts of Bangladesh were under Warid network coverage. Warid thus became a pan Bangladeshi mobile network.

== Network ==
Warid invested US$1 billion in setting up its network across the nation. The network deployed in Bangladesh by Warid was based on the next generation mobile technology. Ericsson was selected as the vendor for its network base stations, microwave links, IT support and transmission towers.

Warid franchise with 016 prefix depicted on the board

=== Radio frequency ===
Frequency used by Warid network
Frequency	Protocol	Class
900 MHz	GSM/GPRS/EDGE	2G
1800 MHz	GSM/GPRS/EDGE	2G

=== Number scheming ===
Warid used the following numbering scheme:

+8801678600786

Where 880 is the ISD code for Bangladesh and is required when dialling outside the country, 16 was the prefix for Warid allocated by the government of Bangladesh. Omitting +880 would require 0 instead to represent local call, hence 016 was the general prefix and N_{1}N_{2}N_{3}N_{4}N_{5}N_{6}N_{7}N_{8} is the subscriber number.

== Marketing ==
Inner side of a Warid outlet

Warid presented prepaid and postpaid plans branded as zem and zahi. Derived from an Arabic word meaning fun, zem caters the needs of pay-as-you-go customers. Likewise, zahi means royal and is an array of postpaid tariff plans.

Warid had ten business centres around the country located at key locations. These centers were controlled and operated by Warid. It had another 120 franchises across Bangladesh, which was further backed up by a chain of sub-franchises, affinity partners & distributors.

== Acquisition ==
In 2010, Warid Telecom sold a majority 70% stake in the company to India's Bharti Airtel Limited for US$300 million. The Bangladesh Telecommunication Regulatory Commission approved the deal on January 4, 2010.

Bharti Airtel Limited took management control of the company and its board, and rebranded the company's services under its own Airtel brand in December 2010.

In March 2013, Warid Telecom sold its remaining 30% shares to Bharti Airtel's Singapore-based concern Bharti Airtel Holdings Pte Limited.

== See also ==
- List of mobile network operators in Bangladesh
