= Agence de Régulation des Postes et des Communication Electroniques Republique du Congo =

- Abbreviation: ARPCE
- Formation: 25 November 2009
- Purpose: Regulator and competition authority for broadcasting, postal services, telecommunications and radiocommunications spectrum
- Headquarters: Brazzaville, Republic of the Congo
- Location: Brazzaville, Republic of the Congo
- Region served: Republic of the Congo
- Official language: French
- Main organ: Board
- Website: www.arpce.cg

ARPCE (French: Agence de Régulation des Postes et des Communication Electroniques Republique du Congo) is the state market regulator of the post and electronic communications in the Republic of the Congo. The agency is located in Brazzaville, Republic of the Congo.

== See also ==
- Warid Congo
