= Bashir A. Tahir =

Bashir Tahir
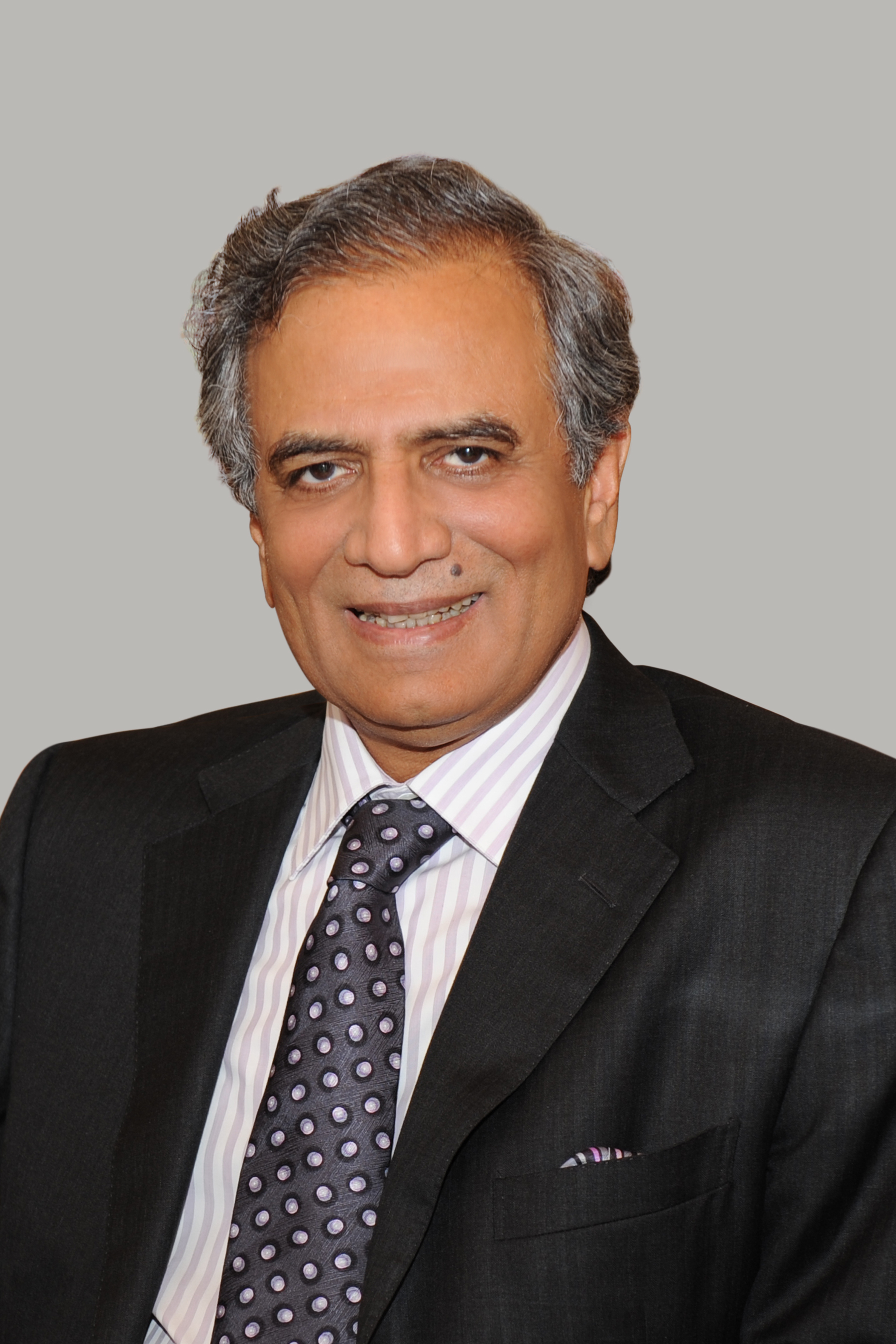
- Born: Bhera, Punjab, Pakistan
- Awards: Sitara-i-Imtiaz (Star of Excellence) Award by the President of Pakistan in 2006
- Website: Bashir Tahir

Bashir Tahir is a Pakistani former banker and business executive. He is the former CEO of Dhabi Group, a member of the Board of Wateen Telecom and board member and CEO of Warid Telecom International LLC. He is also the former CEO of the Abu Dhabi Group, which is a consortium of investors led by Dhabi Group as the lead investor, and a former Member of the Board Advisory Committee and Board Audit Committee for Bank Alfalah Limited. Previously, Tahir served as general manager and CEO for Union National Bank.

He was until recently a board member of the Board of Investment of Pakistan.

== Career ==
Tahir is a career banker since November 1962; with over forty years experience in finance and Mr. Tahir has over the past 12 years focused on advising and leading private equity and buyout ventures for the members of the UAE royal family and their co-investors. Mr. Tahir is a pioneer for encouraging the collaboration of the various family offices of the ruling families in the region to help form what is now known as the Abu Dhabi Group.

Under the Abu Dhabi Group consortium of investors, Mr. Tahir has been directly responsible for over US$3bn. worth of foreign direct investments into Pakistan's financial and telecommunications sectors. Mr. Tahir has advised on transactions worth US$500m overseas, and has actively led investments into Africa and the CIS, helping the Group to expand its presence into the banking and telecommunications sectors there.

== Awards and recognition ==
- Sitara-e-Imtiaz (Star of Distinction) Award by the President of Pakistan in 2006 in recognition of his contribution to Pakistan's banking sector.
- Global Pakistani Award as acknowledgement of his services towards building stronger economic ties between the UAE and Pakistan.
