= Robi (company) =

Telecommunications company in Bangladesh

Robi Axiata PLC
- Logo since 2010
- Native name: রবি আজিয়াটা পিএলসি
- Formerly: TM International Bangladesh Limited (dba: AKTEL or AKTel); Robi Axiata Limited
- Type: Public subsidiary
- Traded as: DSE: ROBI; CSE: ROBI
- Industry: Mobile telecommunication services
- Founded: 15 November 1997; 29 years ago
- Founder: A.M. Zahiruddin Khan
- Headquarters: Robi Corporate Office, The Forum, 187-188/B, Bir Uttam Mir Shawkat Sarak, Tejgaon Industrial Area, Dhaka, Bangladesh
- Area served: Bangladesh
- Key people: Rajeev Sethi (CEO)
- Brands: Robi; cirkle; bdtickets.com; Robi Wifi; Binge
- Services: Mobile telephony; Mobile internet; Digital services; GSM; 4G LTE; VoLTE; eSIM; 5G; Wireless Broadband
- Revenue: ▲BDT৳99.503 billion (2024)
- Net income: ▲BDT৳7.028 billion
- Owner: Axiata (61.82%); Bharti Airtel (28.18%); Public holds (10%)
- Members: 56.7 million (Q4 2024)
- Subsidiaries: Axentec PLC; Binge; RedDot Digital Limited; Smart Pay Limited; Bangladesh Infrastructure Company Limited
- Website: www.robi.com.bd

Robi Axiata PLC (d/b/a Robi, stylized "robi axiata") is the second largest mobile network operator in Bangladesh. Axiata of Malaysia holds a major controlling stake of 61.82% in the company, while Bharti Enterprises of India (owner of Bharti Airtel) holds 28.18% and investors in DSE and CSE hold 10%. Robi first commenced operation in 1997 as TM International Bangladesh Limited with the brand name AKTEL and was a joint venture of A K Khan & Company, Axiata (Telekom Malaysia) and NTT Docomo.

In 2010, the company was re-branded to ‘Robi’ and the company changed its name to Robi Axiata Limited. As per government rule, the name changed to Robi Axiata PLC in 2024 as Robi is listed in Stock Market and a Public Limited Company. Robi Axiata has FDD spectrum on 900, 1800 & 2100 and TDD spectrum on 2600 MHz bands.

On 16 November 2016, Airtel Bangladesh was merged into Robi. Currently Robi has 2G GSM, 4G LTE and 5G NR networks commercially live since the 3G UMTS network was shut down.

== History ==
Robi Axiata PLC started as a joint venture company between Telekom Malaysia and AK Khan and Company. It was formerly known as Telekom Malaysia International Bangladesh Limited which commenced operations in Bangladesh in 1997 with the brand name 'AKTEL'. In 2007, AK Khan and Company exited the business by selling its 30% stake to Japan's NTT Docomo for US$350 million.

In 2009, then AKTEL, now Robi Axiata, was the first operator to introduce GPRS and 3.5G services in the country.

On 28 March 2010, 'AKTEL' was rebranded as 'Robi' which means "sun" in Bengali. It also took the logo of parent company Axiata Group which itself also went through a major rebranding in 2009. In 2013, after five years of presence, Docomo reduced its ownership to 8% for Axiata to take 92%.

On 28 January 2016, it was announced that Robi Axiata and Airtel Bangladesh will merge in Q1 2016. The combined entity will be called Robi, to serve about 40 million subscribers combined by both networks. Axiata Group will own 68.3% share, while Bharti Group will own 25%, and NTT Docomo held 6.31% shares. Finally Robi and Airtel were merged on 16 November 2016 and Robi set sail as the merged company. Later on, in 2020, after a decade with Robi, NTT Docomo decided to leave Bangladesh by selling its remaining stake in Robi Axiata PLC to Bharti International.

In August 2021, CEO Mahtab Uddin Ahmed stepped down as Robi CEO. Company CFO M Riyaaz Rasheed stepped in as acting CEO in addition to his current duties.

Mobile network operator Robi Axiata PLC has appointed Rajeev Sethi as the company's chief executive officer from October 2022. He will be replacing M Riyaaz Rasheed, who has been serving as Robi's acting chief executive officer since August 2021.

Robi won the GSMA Glomo award for the Best Mobile Innovation for Education and Learning in the "Connected Life Awards" category at the Mobile World Congress (MWC) 2017, is noteworthy.

On 1 September 2025, Robi became the first telecom operator to launch 5G in Bangladesh, with initial rollouts in Dhaka, Chittagong and Sylhet. This was soon followed by Grameenphone, which became the second operator to do so.

On 17 August 2026, Robi replaced the Airtel brand with cirkle. Although Airtel has rebranded to Cirkle, subcribers' remaining account balance, etc was not impacted.

== Numbering scheme ==
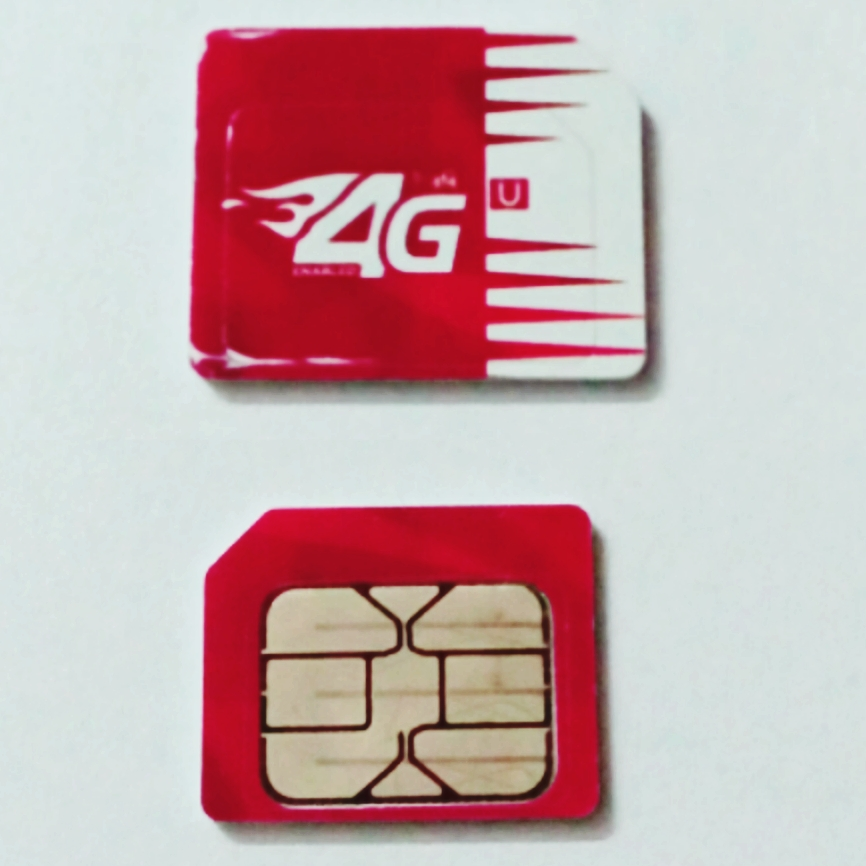
Both sides of a Robi 4G SIM card

Robi uses the following numbering scheme for its subscribers:

For General Subscribers

+880 18 NNNNNNNN

+880 16 NNNNNNNN

For IoT Subscribers

+880 63 NNNNNNNN

Where, +880 is the International subscriber dialing code for Bangladesh.

16, 18 & 63 is the access code for Robi as assigned by the Government of Bangladesh. Omitting +88 will require to use 0 in place of it instead to represent local call, hence 016, 018 and 063 is the general access code.

N_{1}N_{2}N_{3}N_{4}N_{5}N_{6}N_{7}N_{8} is the subscriber number.

After the merger with Airtel, Robi owns the 016 number series as well, which has been rebranded to cirkle.

In 2018, when Mobile number portability was introduced, users can port to any operator without changing number.

== Network ==
Robi is currently the second largest mobile operator in Bangladesh in terms of total number of mobile towers or BTS. As of August 2024, Robi has a total of 18,473 Mobile Network Tower or BTS across the country. On 1 September 2025, Robi also launched 5G for the first time in Bangladesh.

== Spectrums ==
The Robi network is also GPRS/EDGE/4G-enabled, with a growing 5G network, allowing internet access within its coverage area. its Total spectrum volume is 124.00 MHz, 104.00 MHz is currently being used by Robi, the remaining 20 MHz will be added from June 2025.

Frequencies used on ROBI Network in Bangladesh:

Band: 8/900 MHz, Total Frequency: 09 MHz, Width: EDGE/LTE/LTE-A, Protocol: 2CC,3CC,4CC,5CC,6CC

Band: 3/ 1800 MHz, Total Frequency: 20 MHz, Width: EDGE/LTE/LTE-A, Protocol: 2CC,3CC,4CC,5CC,6CC

== Products ==
- Robi Prepaid Package list - Robi 365, Robi Cirkle, Robi Nobanno, Robi Mega FnF etc.
- Robi Postpaid Package list - Robi Ace, Robi Cirkle Postpaid, Robi Corporate etc

== Services ==
=== Binge ===
Binge
- Company type: Subsidiary
- Website type: OTT streaming platform
- Available in: Bangla
- Headquarters: Gulshan, Dhaka, Bangladesh
- Country of origin: Bangladesh
- Area served: Worldwide
- Owner: Robi Axiata
- Industry: Tech & Entertainment
- Products: Streaming media; Video on demand; Digital distribution
- Services: Film production; Film distribution; Television production; Television distribution
- Parent: Robi Axiata
- Website: binge.buzz
- Commercial: Yes
- Registration: Required
- Launched: 21 May 2020; 6 years ago
- Current status: Active

Binge is a Bangladeshi subscription video on-demand over-the-top streaming platform and original programming production company. It is owned by RedDot Digital via subsidiary of Robi Axiata. It was launched on 21 May 2020 through a Facebook event. The platform primarily offers and distributes live television channels, series and films licensed to Binge, as Binge Originals. The service also hosts content from other providers, content add-ons, live sporting events.

Binge stepped into international market on 25 June 2021 by launching its service in Malaysia with the co-operation of Celcom. In March 2022, Binge expanded its availability to more than 120 countries. Currently operating worldwide, Binge has both free and premium subscription options.

At the very beginning, Robi Axiata had decided to use Wowza's Streaming Engine but later they designed a streaming platform that can work with the Streaming Engine and could be configured for best performance. On 21 May 2020, the streaming platform launched by the name, "Binge".

Binge is being made of combining IPTV and digital entertainment services into a single online streaming site. It was the first Bangladeshi Google-certified online video streaming service that can be used on any Android device, including phones and televisions.

==== Content ====
Binge mainly focuses on Bangla language content. They have two categories of contents: premium and free respectively. To watch premium, content subscription is required.

Binge is available now from more than 120 countries around the world. Binge has come up with two subscription plans for global audience. Users can avail of the service both in monthly and yearly subscription plans.

Subsequently, it has logged in 1 lakh subscriptions in just over three months.

Binge is maintained by RedDot Digital currently in partnership with Genex Infosys. Binge Android smart device and streaming platform- both were developed by Genex Infosys.

=== bdtickets ===
bdtickets is a ticketing platform operated by Robi Axiata.

== See also ==
- cirkle
- Telecommunications in Bangladesh
- List of companies of Bangladesh
- Grameenphone
- Banglalink
- Internet in Bangladesh
- List of telecommunications companies of Bangladesh
- List of media companies of Bangladesh
- Mass media in Bangladesh
- Ministry of Information and Broadcasting (Bangladesh)
