= Gopal Vittal =

Indian business executive (born 1967)

CEO of Bharti Airtel
- Incumbent
- Assumed office 1 March 2013
- Preceded by: Sanjay Kapoor

Personal details
- Born: 1967 or 1968 (age 58–59)
- Education: Indian Institute of Management Calcutta; Madras Christian College, Chennai

Gopal Vittal (born 1967) is an Indian business executive. He is the chief executive officer (CEO) of Bharti Airtel (India) and South Asia, an Indian multinational telecommunications services company with operations in 20 countries.

Vittal has an undergraduate degree from Madras Christian College and MBA from IIM Calcutta. He did his schooling at Rishi Valley School in Andhra Pradesh, India.

== Career ==
After graduating from IIM Calcutta in 1990, he joined Hindustan Unilever Limited (HUL), one of India's biggest FMCG companies. Early in his career at HUL, he did two stints as an Area Sales Manager, and worked in Brooke Bond and several skincare brands. One of his biggest achievements in HUL was Project Bharat, a successful rural-reach strategy that incentivized people in rural areas to try HUL's products.

In 2006, he was roped in by Sunil Mittal (founder and Group CEO of Bharti Enterprises) to join Bharti Airtel as the head of marketing. His first stint at Airtel lasted only two years, till 2008. During this period, he redefined the relationship between operations and marketing in the organization, and changed Bharti's marketing strategy to cater to the mass market. His other major achievements during this period included segmenting customers to develop targeted offerings, and bundling mobile handsets with Airtel offers.

In 2008, Vittal was persuaded to return to HUL by its CEO, Nitin Paranjpe. He was reappointed head of the home and personal care (HPC) businesses and given a board seat, superseding several company executives. In the period before Vittal, HPC businesses were growing at only 5-6 percent per annum at HUL. Vittal turned around the businesses, and between 2008 and 2012, the segment grew at a compounded annual rate of 14.7 per cent. Vittal, who was seen in HUL as second only to Paranjpe, left the company again in early 2012, a few months before the latter received a five-year extension as CEO.

In early 2012, Vittal re-joined Bharti Airtel, as a Director in charge of special projects and international business strategy. He spent most of 2012 and early 2013 at Singtel. In early 2013, Airtel announced that Vittal would be the next CEO of Airtel India. He took over as the CEO on 1 March 2013.
