= Bacha Khan International Airport =

Airport in Peshawar, Pakistan

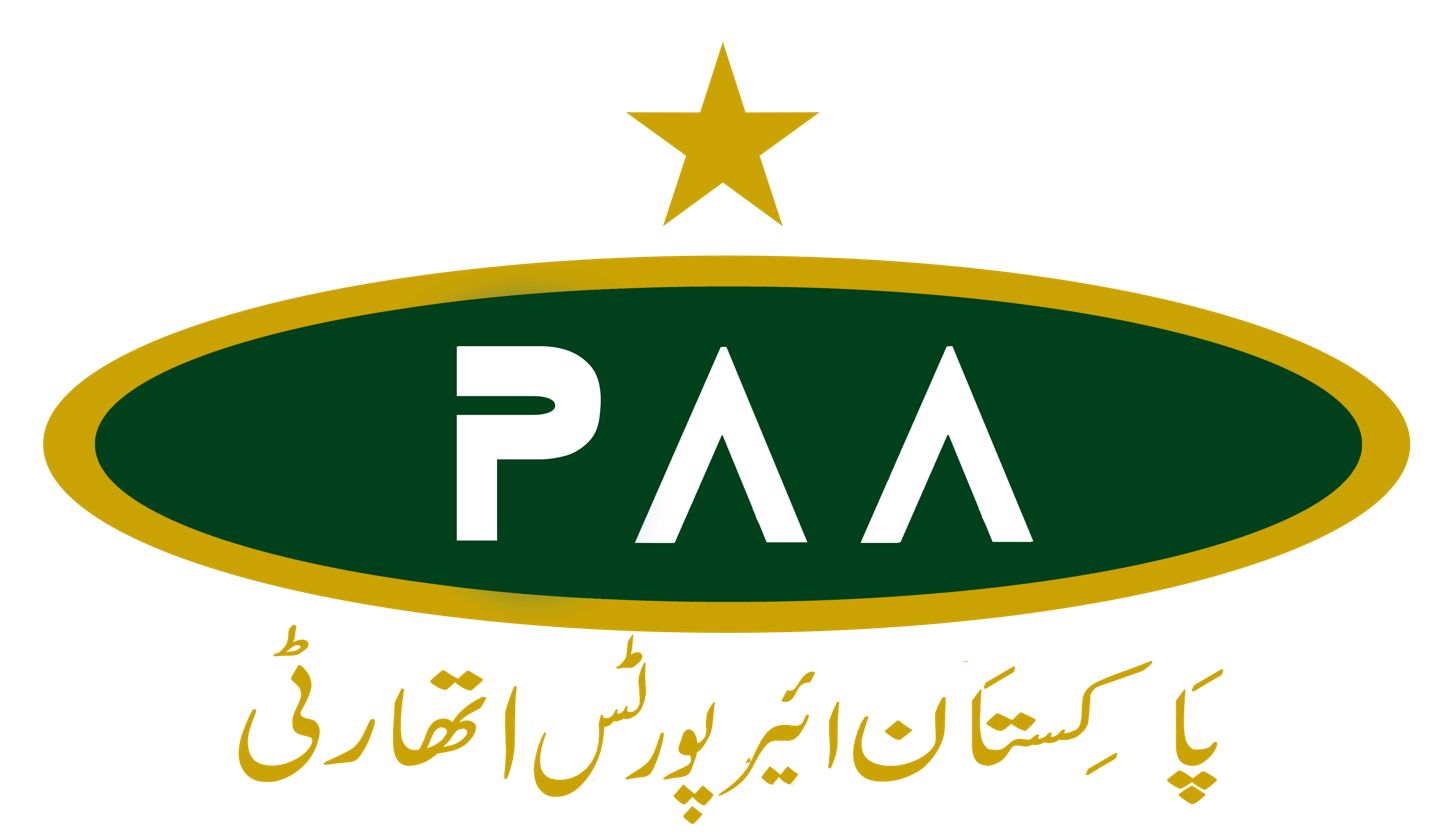
Bacha Khan International Airport باچا خان بین الاقوامی ہوائی اڈا د باچا خان نړیوال هوايي ډګر
- IATA: PEW; ICAO: OPPS

Summary
- Airport type: Public
- Owner: GoP Aviation Division
- Operator: Pakistan Airports Authority
- Serves: Peshawar-24820
- Location: Peshawar District, Khyber Pakhtunkwa, Pakistan
- Opened: 1927; 99 years ago
- Elevation AMSL: 1,211 ft (369 m)
- Coordinates: 33°59′38″N 71°30′52″E
- Website: www.peshawarairport.com.pk

Maps
- Location of airport in Pakistan OPPS (Pakistan) OPPS (South Asia)
- Interactive map of Bacha Khan International Airport

Runways
Direction	Length		Surface
Direction	ft	m	Surface
17/35	9,000	2,743	Bitumen

Statistics (July 2024 – June 2025)
- Passengers: 1,161,063 ▼8.51%
- Aircraft movements: 6,920 ▼8.50%
- Cargo handled: 9,514 Metric Tons ▼14.37%
- Source: Statistics from the Pakistan Civil Aviation Authority

Bacha Khan International Airport (IATA: PEW, ICAO: OPPS), formerly known as Peshawar International Airport, is an international airport located in Peshawar, Khyber Pakhtunkhwa, Pakistan. Located on the southwestern end of the city of Peshawar, it is the fourth-busiest airport in Pakistan.

One of the main runways of the airport is crossed by a railway line known as the Khyber train safari, which runs to the town of Landi Kotal in the Khyber Pass for the express purpose of tourism. The airport was renamed on 27 January 2012 after Abdul Ghaffar Khan (nicknamed Bacha Khan), leader of the Khudai Khidmatgar and a prominent Pashtun nationalist figure. The airport was extensively reconstructed from 2016 to 2018.

== History ==
Strategically situated in the heart of Peshawar, Bacha Khan International Airport is located approximately 180 km from Islamabad (federal capital of Pakistan) which makes it about a two-hour drive from the capital via M-1 motorway. Since Peshawar is the capital of the Khyber Pakhtunkhwa province, it provides world connections for the majority of the northwest region of the country and adjoining areas of Afghanistan. Since the province has a large Afghan Pashtun community residing within KPK, Afghanistan flights have always been on the rise.

The airport traces its origins to 1927 when there was a small airfield that catered to much of the British Empire and Imperial Airways aircraft that were either travelling onwards to the east (e.g. to China and Malaysia/Singapore) or west (e.g. Europe and America). For this reason the city was given the nickname "Gateway to the East" because it linked the traditional oriental culture to modern occidental traditions.

The airport gained importance after the independence of Pakistan from the British Raj; the Civil Aviation Authority of Pakistan (CAA) and the Pakistan Air Force started to use the airfield jointly for both military and civil operations. There were countless flights operated to and from Pakistan's largest city, Karachi, as well as other cities within the newly formed state.

The airport achieved international status in 1965 when the first flight was operated from Kabul, Afghanistan to Peshawar. The flight was operated by the national flag carrier, Pakistan International Airlines (PIA). As years went on the airport grew with more flights and aircraft and relative upgrade was carried out from time to time. It was not until 1981 that the CAA extended the terminal to meet future needs for the next decade and to meet the estimated growth of passengers. The apron was developed fully by 1986, where the airport was able to handle four widebody aircraft and two small narrow body aircraft at one time.

PIA commenced service to Birmingham in July 2004. In January 2008 the provincial government met to discuss the expansion work needed to upgrade the quality of the aircraft in terms of facilities, terminal modernisation and cargo growth. In June 2008 the Deputy Director General of the CAA, Air Vice Marshal Sajid Habib, said that five billion rupees have been allocated to expand and develop Peshawar airport. Details of the work performed are ambiguous.

== Structure ==
Peshawar is a major passenger hub with 75% flights internationally bound. The airport is currently under evaluation to be upgraded. The CAA is currently working with the provincial government to develop the airport to meet international standards. The airport has some facilities to handle the basic needs of travellers, such as telephone booths (domestic/international), currency exchange, automatic teller machines (ATMs), Internet stations (powered by Wateen), information counters, gifts and souvenir shops, snack shops, rental car services, and a post office.

The runway is 9,000 feet (2,700 m) long, 150 feet (46 m) wide with 10-foot-wide (3.0 m) shoulders on either side corresponding to International Civil Aviation Organisation Category 4E. It is crossed by a (rarely-operational) railway line, one of the few such runways in the world. Max capacity: Boeing 777-300ER. There is nose-in parking for 4 wide-bodied aircraft at a time or 3 Airbus and 2 narrow-body aircraft at a time. The airport has 2 air bridges which were constructed in 2018.

== Airlines and destinations ==
Airlines	Destinations
Air Arabia	Ras Al Khaimah, Sharjah
AirSial	Karachi, Jeddah
Emirates	Dubai–International
Etihad Airways	Abu Dhabi
Flyadeal	Riyadh
Flydubai	Dubai–International
Fly Jinnah	Karachi
Pakistan International Airlines	Abu Dhabi, Doha, Dubai–International, Jeddah, Karachi, Muscat, Riyadh, Sharjah
Qatar Airways	Doha
SalamAir	Muscat
South Air	Lahore, Quetta
Saudia	Jeddah, Riyadh

== Incidents and accidents ==
- On 1 May 1960 a Lockheed U-2 spyplane, piloted by Gary Powers, left Peshawar Airport intending to fly over the Soviet Union. His plane was shot down and he was captured and put on trial in the USSR. This triggered the U-2 crisis of 1960.
- On 26 March 1965, a PIA Douglas C-47A-1-DK took off from the airport. The aircraft lost contact with air traffic control mid flight. The aircraft had crash landed at the Lowery Pass. All passengers and crew did not survive the accident and the aircraft was written off.
- A PIA Fokker F27 Friendship was making a night approach at the airport on 23 October 1986. Due to co-pilot error, the aircraft was lower than expected. The aircraft undershot the runway, causing it to land in a ditch which caused the aircraft to break up. Thirteen passengers and crew sustained serious injuries and the aircraft was written off.
- Six international airlines had temporarily suspended flights to Peshawar in view of the deteriorating security situation in that part of Pakistan. This followed a rocket attack on the airport in August 2009. The absence of a functional five star hotel in the city after the Pearl Continental hotel bombing was also said to be one of the causes. The airlines were Saudi Arabian Airlines, Emirates, Gulf Air, Air Arabia, Qatar Airways and Etihad Airways. All the airlines resumed services to the city after a short hiatus, and RAK Airways even commenced new services as well.
- On 15 December 2012, the airport suffered a coordinated assault by a team of terrorists, which killed nine people.
- On 25 June 2014, Pakistan International Airlines Flight 756, an Airbus A310-300 registered as AP-BGN, originating from Riyadh was fired upon while it was flying at low altitude and landing at Peshawar, by unknown gunmen positioned outside the airport's vicinity. One woman was killed, while two passengers and a flight steward were reported injured who were rushed to hospital. The incident came just weeks after the deadly Jinnah Airport attack, sparking concerns over security of airports. Authorities launched a search operation after the incident, during which 200 were taken into custody. The UAE-based carriers Emirates and Etihad temporarily suspended their flight operations to Peshawar, but both carriers relaunched flights in August.
- On 23 April 2019, an Airblue A320 Registered AP-EDA operating PA613 from Sharjah to Peshawar suffered a runway excursion on landing. The aircraft stopped beyond the end of the runway, but still on paved surface. No injuries were reported.
- On 11 July 2024, a Saudi Airlines Airbus A330, registered HZ-AQ28, operating SV792 from Riyadh to Peshawar, caught fire during landing due to an issue in the landing gear. The aircraft stopped, and all 297 crew and passengers safely evacuated.

== See also ==
- PAF Base Peshawar, a Pakistani Air Force base adjoined with the airport
- List of airports in Pakistan
- Pakistan Civil Aviation Authority
- Shaheen Airport Services
- Transport in Pakistan
