= Warid Congo =

Warid Congo SA
- passer à l'action Take action
- Type: Telecommunication operator
- Industry: Telecommunication
- Founded: 2008
- Fate: Acquired by Airtel Congo
- Headquarters: Brazzaville, Republic of the Congo
- Area served: Brazzaville; Pointe – Noire; Dolisie; Kinkala; N'Kayi; Madingou; Mindouli; Loudima; Gamboma; Ollombo; Oyo; Ewo; Mengo; Yamba; Ouesso; Ngombe; Pokola
- Key people: Michel Elame (CEO)
- Products: Mobile services Data services Blackberry solution Mobile banking
- Website: www.waridtel.cg

Warid Congo SA was a GSM based mobile operator in the Republic of the Congo before its acquisition by Indian telecom company Airtel. It launched commercial operations on 14 March 2008.

Warid Congo is a joint venture between Warid Telecom International and the government of the Congo. At present, Warid is the country's third largest cellular operator having a subscriber base of 1 million with a market share of 17.7%.

== History ==
Warid Telecom International acquired a GSM based mobile license in January 2008 less than a week after the commercial launch of Warid Uganda. The company launched commercial service in 11 cities and towns in first phase.

== Network ==
Warid Congo currently uses GSM based GPRS (2.5G) and Edge (2.75G) technologies.

Frequencies used by Warid network
Frequency	Protocol	Class
900 MHz	GSM/GPRS/EDGE	2G, 2.5G, 2.75G

=== National numbering plan ===
Warid uses the following numbering scheme:

+242 04 X_{1}X_{2}X_{3}X_{4}X_{5}X_{6}X_{7}

Where, 242 is the ISD code for the Republic of Congo and is required when dialling outside the country, 04 is the national destination code for Warid allocated by Agence de Régulation des Postes et des Communications Electroniques, Brazzaville. The subscriber number along with national destination code constitute the national significant number and is nine digit long.

== Products and services ==
Warid Congo offers pay-as-you-go plans. This prepaid service comes with 64K SIM card. Subscribes can call up any local, national, and international telephone numbers. Such plans include Warid basic prepaid offer, Warid Welcome, Baninga friends and family service, and Warid Xpress.

In addition to sending and receiving SMS service, voicemail, voice based messaging service SMS Koza, end call notification on call completion, IVR, and USSD recharge are included in the prepaid base Warid connection. Other value added services such as mobile internet and waiting tone under the brand of WaridNet and WaridMusik can also be availed.

== Mobile banking ==
In February 2012, Warid Congo announced the launch of Warid Mobicash over its network. Mobicash service facilitates customers to have money transaction even more secure. Moreover, payments can be transferred through the mobile phones and this service is available on all models of mobile phones and carriers. This service is open to everyone with no complications to download software and no restrictions for registration.
