= Warid Telecom =

United Arab Emirates telecommunication company held by Abu Dhabi Group

Warid Telecom International وارد تليكوم الدولية
- Type: Private
- Industry: Telecommunication
- Founded: 2004; 22 years ago
- Defunct: 2015
- Headquarters: Abu Dhabi, United Arab Emirates
- Key people: Sheikh Al Nahyan Bin Mubarak Al Nahyan, Chairman; Bashir Tahir, founding CEO
- Products: Telephony, LTE, WiMAX, EDGE, GPRS, GSM, UMTS
- Subsidiaries: List: Warid Bangladesh Warid Congo Warid Pakistan

Warid Telecom International (Arabic: وارد تليكوم الدولية) was an Emirati telecommunications company that was active in Bangladesh, Georgia, Congo, Pakistan, and Uganda before its divestment.

== Pakistan ==
In 2004, Warid Telecom International LLC purchased a license for operating a nationwide mobile telephony network, (WLL) and long-distance international (LDI) for US$291 million and was the first venture of Warid Telecom International LLC. The license was bid for and acquired by a team led by Bashir Tahir the former CEO of the Abu Dhabi Group, which is the parent company of all Warid operations.

Warid Pakistan launched its services in May 2005. Within 80 days of launch, Warid Pakistan claims to have attracted more than 1 million users.

On June 30, 2007, Singapore Telecommunications Limited (SingTel) and Warid Telecom announced that they had entered into a definitive agreement subsequent to which SingTel would acquire a 30 percent equity stake in Warid Telecom for an estimated $758 million, valuing the company at an enterprise value of $2.9 billion.

SingTel sold back that stake in January 2013 for $150 million and a right to receive 7.5 percent of the net proceeds from any future sale, public offering, or merger of Warid.

On November 26, 2015, VimpelCom and Abu Dhabi Group agreed to merge Mobilink and Warid into a single company called Jazz.

=== Network technology ===
Frequencies used by the Warid network
Frequency	Protocol	Band	Class
900 MHz	GSM/GPRS/EDGE		2G
1800 MHz	GSM/GPRS/EDGE		2G
2100 MHz	UMTS/HSDPA/HSPA+	1	3.5G
1800 MHz	LTE	3	4G

== Bangladesh ==
In December 2005, Warid Telecom International LLC obtained a 15-year GSM license to operate as the sixth mobile phone operator in Bangladesh for $50 million. Warid Bangladesh started rolling out its network from mid-2006, and launched commercial operations on May 10, 2007, covering 26 districts. It uses the code 16 preceded by the code number of Bangladesh +880. Warid Bangladesh acquired a million subscribers within 70 days of launch.

Warid Telecom sold 70% of its stake in Bangladesh operations to India's Bharti Airtel for $300 million receiving regulatory approval from the Bangladesh Telecommunication Regulatory Commission (BTRC) on January 4, 2010.

On December 20, 2010, Warid Telecom was rebranded as Airtel.

== Georgia ==
Licence awarded.

=== Network technology ===
Network	Status	Date	Note
WiMAX	Live/Active	unknown	

== Ivory Coast ==
Licence awarded.

== Republic of Congo ==
Launched service in January 2008. On November 5, 2013, The Wall Street Journal reported an acquisition by Airtel.

=== Network technology ===
Network	Status	Date	Note
GSM900	Live/Active	November 2007	

== Uganda ==
Planned to launch services in Uganda by the fourth quarter of 2007. Warid is also set to deploy a WiMAX network throughout Uganda through its sister concern Wateen Telecom. Acquired by Airtel in 2013.

=== Network technology ===
Network	Status	Date	Note
GSM 900/1800	Live/Active	January, 2008	
WiMAX	Live/Active	unknown	
