= Bharti Airtel =

Indian multinational telecommunications company

Bharti Airtel Limited
- Trade name: Airtel
- Type: Public
- Traded as: BSE: 532454; NSE: BHARTIARTL; BSE SENSEX constituent; NSE NIFTY 50 constituent
- ISIN: INE397D01024
- Industry: Telecommunications
- Founded: 7 July 1995; 31 years ago
- Founder: Sunil Mittal
- Headquarters: New Delhi, India
- Area served: South Asia, Africa, Channel Islands
- Key people: Sunil Mittal (chairman); Gopal Vittal (MD, Vice chairman & CEO)
- Products: Fixed line telephone; Mobile telephony; Broadband; Satellite television; Payments bank; Digital television; Internet television; IPTV; OTT services
- Revenue: ▲₹210,737 crore (US$22 billion) (2026)
- Operating income: ▲₹119,674 crore (US$12 billion) (2026)
- Net income: ▼₹33,823 crore (US$3.5 billion) (2026)
- Total assets: ▲₹552,152 crore (US$57 billion) (2026)
- Total equity: ▲₹149,057 crore (US$15 billion) (2026)
- Owners: Bharti Enterprises (40.47%); Singtel (8.32%); Indian Continent Investment Limited (2.47%); Public float (48.74%)
- Members: ▲65 crore (650 million) (March 2026)
- Number of employees: 28,730 (March 2026)
- Divisions: Airtel Africa; Airtel Asia; Airtel Europe
- Subsidiaries: Airtel India; Robi Axiata PLC; Airtel Payments Bank; Indus Towers (51.23%)
- Website: airtel.com
- Footnotes; Financials as of 31 December 2025.

Bharti Airtel is an Indian multinational telecommunications company, headquartered in New Delhi. It operates in 18 countries across the Indian subcontinent, Africa, and the Channel Islands. In India, the company provides mobile telephony services using 5G, 4G, and LTE Advanced technologies, along with fixed-line broadband and voice services, while the range of services varies by country of operation.

Airtel is the largest mobile network operator in India and second largest mobile network operator in the world. It has also deployed Voice over LTE (VoLTE) technology across telecom circles in India to support voice calls over 4G networks.

== History ==
In 1984, Sunil Mittal started assembling push-button phones in India, which he earlier used to import from a Singaporean company, Singtel, replacing the old-fashioned, bulky rotary phones that were in use in the country then. Bharti Telecom Limited (BTL) was incorporated and entered into a technical tie-up with Siemens AG of Germany for the manufacture of electronic push-button phones. By the early 1990s, Bharti was making fax machines, cordless phones and other telecom gear. He named his first push-button Telephone as 'Mitbrau'.

In 1992, he successfully bid for one of the four mobile phone network licenses auctioned in India. One of the conditions for the Delhi cellular licenses was that the bidder have some experience as a telecom operator. So, Mittal clinched a deal with the French telecom group Vivendi. He was one of the first Indian entrepreneurs to identify the mobile telecom business as a major growth area. His plans were finally approved by the Government in 1994 and he launched services in Delhi in 1995, when Bharti Cellular Limited (BCL) was formed to offer cellular services under the brand name AirTel. Within a few years, Bharti became the first telecom company to cross the 2 million mobile subscriber mark. Bharti also brought down the STD/ISD cellular rates in India under the brand name 'India one'.

In 1999, Bharti Enterprises acquired control of JT Holdings, and extended cellular operations to Karnataka and Andhra Pradesh. In 2000, Bharti acquired control of Skycell Communications, in Chennai. In 2001, the company acquired control of Spice Cell in Kolkata. Bharti Enterprises went public in 2002, and the company was listed on Bombay Stock Exchange and National Stock Exchange of India. In 2003, the cellular phone operations were re-branded under the single Airtel brand. In 2004, Bharti acquired control of Hexacom and entered Rajasthan. In 2005, Bharti extended its network to Andaman and Nicobar. This expansion allowed it to offer voice services all across India.

In July 2004, Airtel launched "Hello Tunes", a caller ring back tone service (Ringing Tone), becoming the first operator in India to do so. The Airtel theme song was composed by A. R. Rahman.

Logo used by Airtel from 1995 to 2002

Logo used by Airtel from 2002 to 2010

In 2009, Bharti negotiated for its strategic partner Alcatel-Lucent to manage the network infrastructure for the fixed-line business. Later, Bharti Airtel awarded the three-year contract to Alcatel-Lucent for setting up an Internet Protocol access network across the country. This would help consumers access internet at faster-speed and high-quality internet browsing on mobile handsets.

In 2009, Airtel launched its first international mobile network in Sri Lanka. In June 2010, Bharti acquired the African business of Zain Telecom for $10.7 billion, making it the largest ever acquisition by an Indian telecom firm. In 2012, Bharti tied up with Walmart, the US retail giant, to start a number of retail stores across India. In 2014, Bharti planned to acquire Loop Mobile for ₹7 billion (US$73 million), but the deal was called off later.

On 18 November 2010, Airtel rebranded itself in India in the first phase of a global rebranding strategy. The company unveiled a new logo with 'airtel' written in lower case. Designed by London-based brand agency, Superunion, the new logo is the letter 'a' in lowercase, with 'airtel' written in lowercase under the logo. On 23 November 2010, Airtel's Africa operations were rebranded to 'airtel'. Sri Lanka followed on 28 November 2010 and on 20 December 2010, Warid Telecom rebranded to 'airtel' in Bangladesh.

In May 2024, Bharti Airtel announced a collaboration with Google Cloud to support cloud adoption and the development of generative AI solutions for businesses in India.

In July 2024, Bharti Airtel and Nokia successfully completed India's first non‑standalone (NSA) 5G Cloud‑RAN trial. The trial, conducted over the air using commercial spectrum in the 3.5 GHz (5G) and 2.1 GHz (4G) bands, achieved data throughput of over 1.2 Gbit/s.

In December 2024, Bharti Airtel signed a “multi‑billion” dollar deal with Ericsson to deploy centralized and Open‑RAN‑ready solutions and upgrade 4G/5G radios, aiming to improve network speed, coverage, and reliability.

In March 2025, Bharti Airtel entered into a strategic agreement with SpaceX's Starlink to explore the introduction of satellite-based internet services in India, leveraging Airtel's existing retail and enterprise distribution channels. The collaboration remains subject to regulatory approvals from Indian authorities.

=== Acquisitions and mergers ===
==== MTN Group merger negotiations ====
In May 2006, it emerged that Airtel was exploring the possibility of buying the MTN Group, a South Africa-based telecommunications company with operations in 21 countries in Africa and the Middle East, founded by Leena Jaitley. Financial Times reported that Bharti was considering offering US$45 billion for a 100% stake in MTN, which would be the largest overseas acquisition ever by an Indian firm. However, both sides emphasized the tentative nature of the talks. The Economist magazine noted, "If anything, Bharti would be marrying up", as MTN had more subscribers, higher revenues and broader geographic coverage. However, the talks fell apart as MTN Group tried to reverse the negotiations by making Bharti almost a subsidiary of the new company.

In May 2009, Airtel confirmed that it was again in talks with MTN and both companies agreed to discuss the potential transaction exclusively by 31 July 2009. Airtel said "Bharti Airtel Ltd is pleased to announce that it has renewed its effort for a significant partnership with MTN Group". The exclusivity period was extended twice up to 30 September 2009. Talks eventually ended without agreement.

A solution was proposed where the new company would be listed on two stock exchanges, one in South Africa and one in India. However, dual-listing of companies is not permitted by Indian law.

==== Acquisition of Zain's Africa operations ====
In June 2010, Bharti struck a deal to buy Zain's mobile operations in 15 African countries, in India's second-biggest overseas acquisition after Tata Steel's $13 billion buy of Corus in 2007. Bharti Airtel completed its $10.7 billion acquisition of African operations from the Kuwaiti firm on 8 June 2010, making Airtel the world's fifth largest wireless carrier by subscriber base. Airtel has reported that its revenues for the fourth quarter of 2010 grew by 53% to US$3.2 billion compared to the previous year, newly acquired Zain Africa division contributed US$911 million to the total. However, net profits dropped by 41% from US$470 million in 2009 to US$291 million in 2010 due to a US$188 million increase in radio spectrum charges in India and an increase of US$106 million in debt interest.

==== Warid Bangladesh and Robi ====
In 2010, Warid Telecom sold a majority 70.90% stake in the company to Bharti Airtel for US$300 million. The Bangladesh Telecommunication Regulatory Commission approved the deal on 4 January 2010. Bharti Airtel Limited took management control of the company and its board, and rebranded the company's services under its own "airtel" brand from 20 December 2010. Warid Telecom sold its remaining 30% share to Bharti Airtel's Singapore-based concern Bharti Airtel Holdings Pte Limited in March 2013.

On 16 November 2016, Airtel Bangladesh was merged into Robi as a product brand of Robi, where Robi Axiata Limited is the licensee of airtel brand in Bangladesh. Robi is a joint venture between Malaysian telecom operator Axiata holding 61.82% and Bharti Airtel holding 28.18%.

==== Telecom Seychelles ====
On 11 August 2010, Bharti Airtel announced that it would acquire a 100% stake in Telecom Seychelles for US$62 million taking its global presence to 19 countries. Telecom Seychelles began operations in 1998 and operates 3G, fixed-line, ship to shore services, satellite telephony, among value added services like VSAT and Gateways for International Traffic across Seychelles under the Airtel brand. The company has over 57% share of the mobile market of Seychelles. Airtel announced plans to invest US$10 million in its fixed and mobile telecoms network in Seychelles over three years, whilst also participating in the Seychelles East Africa submarine cable (SEAS) project. The US$34 million SEAS project is aimed at improving Seychelles' global connectivity by building a 2,000 km undersea high-speed link to Dar es Salaam in Tanzania.

==== Wireless Business Services Private Limited ====
On 24 May 2012, Airtel announced an agreement to acquire a 60% stake in Wireless Business Services Private Limited (WBSPL) at an investment of ₹9.07 billion (US$94 million). WBSPL was a joint venture founded by Qualcomm and held BWA spectrum in the telecom circles of Delhi, Haryana, Kerala and Mumbai. Qualcomm had spent US$1 billion to acquire BWA spectrum in those 4 circles. The deal gave Airtel a 4G presence in 18 circles. On 4 July 2013, Airtel announced that it had acquired an additional 5% equity share capital (making its stake 51%) in all the four BWA entities of Qualcomm, thereby making them its subsidiaries. On 18 October 2013, Airtel announced that it had acquired 100 percent equity shares of WBSPL for an undisclosed sum, making it a wholly owned subsidiary.

==== Augere Wireless ====
Airtel purchased Augere Wireless Broadband India Private Limited, a company that owned 4G spectrum in the Chhattisgarh-Madhya Pradesh circle for an undisclosed sum in December 2015. The Economic Times estimated Augere's spectrum to be worth ₹1.5 billion (US$16 million). On 16 February 2017, Airtel announced that the merger of Augere Wireless into Bharti Airtel Limited had been completed.

==== Telenor India ====
On 2 January 2017, The Economic Times reported that Airtel had entered into discussions with Telenor India to acquire the latter. On 23 February 2017, Airtel announced that it had entered into a definitive agreement to acquire Telenor. As part of the deal, Airtel will acquire Telenor India's assets and customers in all seven telecom circles that the latter operates in - Andhra Pradesh, Bihar, Maharashtra, Gujarat, Uttar Pradesh (East), Uttar Pradesh (West) and Assam. Airtel will gain a 43.4 MHz spectrum in the 1800 MHz band from the Telenor acquisition. Business Standard reported that it was a no-cash deal, but would cost Airtel ₹1,600 crore over a 10-year period due to spectrum license payments.

==== Tikona 4G spectrum ====
On 23 March 2017, The Economic Times reported that Airtel had acquired Tikona Infinet Limited's 4G spectrum for approximately ₹1,600 crores. The deal also includes Tikona's 350 cellular sites in 5 circles. Tikona had purchased 20 MHz of 4G spectrum in the 2,300 MHz band in the 2010 auctions in Gujarat, Himachal Pradesh, Uttar Pradesh (East), Uttar Pradesh (West) and Rajasthan for ₹1,058 crores. Prior to the deal, Airtel did not hold any spectrum in the 2300 MHz band in UP (East), UP (West) and Rajasthan, and held 10 MHz each in Gujarat and Himachal Pradesh. Tikona's co-founder Rajesh Tiwari sent a legal notice to both companies for not providing details regarding the splitting of proceeds among shareholders.

==== Tigo Rwanda ====
Bharti Airtel announced on 12 December 2017 that its Rwandan subsidiary had signed an agreement with Millicom to acquire complete control of the latter's Rwandan subsidiary which operates under the brand name of Tigo Rwanda. The deal was estimated to be worth $60–70 million. The company operated as Airtel-Tigo following the merger, until it was rebranded as Airtel Rwanda in January 2020.

==== Tata Docomo ====
In October 2017, Bharti Airtel announced that it would acquire the consumer mobile businesses of Tata Teleservices, Tata Docomo and Tata Teleservices Maharashtra Ltd (TTML), in a debt-free cash-free deal. The deal will essentially be free for Airtel which will only incur TTSL's unpaid spectrum payment liability. TTSL will continue to operate its enterprise, fixed -line and broadband businesses and its stake in tower company Viom Networks. The deal received approval from the Competition Commission of India (CCI) in mid-November 2017. On 29 August 2018, Bharti Airtel got its shareholders' approval for the merger proposal with Tata Teleservices. On 17 January 2019, NCLT Delhi gave final approval for merger between Tata Docomo and Airtel. On 1 July 2019, the consumer mobile business of Tata Teleservices has become part of telecom operator Bharti Airtel.

Airtel will absorb the Tata Sons-owned telco's consumer mobile operations in 19 circles across India—17 under Tata Teleservices and two under Tata Teleservices (Maharashtra) Ltd. As part of the proposed agreement, Airtel will also take over a small portion of the unpaid spectrum liability of Tata Teleservices. Bharti Airtel will get an additional 178.5 MHz of spectrum in three bands—1800 MHz, 2100 MHz and 850 MHz—that are widely used for 4G, an area where Airtel is expanding fast to keep pace with Reliance Jio Infocomm. Airtel will also add about 13 million of Tata Tele's mobile subscribers as of April 2019 to its nearly 322 million users. But most of Tata Tele's mobile users are inactive, as per the regulator.

==== Aqilliz ====
In February 2022, Bharti Airtel announced in Airtel Marq 2.0 and 3.0, Airtel Mall, Airtel Clinic that it has acquired a strategic stake in a blockchain startup Aqilliz via its "Airtel Startup Accelerator Program". Singapore-based Aqilliz is a blockchain-enabled MediaTech startup offering a new age middleware technology for the media marketplace and create a more collaborative digital marketing environment.

In Aug 2024, Bharti Global agreed to purchase 24.5% Stake in UK telecom BT Group.

== Airtel India ==
Bharti Telecom (BTL) is a holding company of Bharti Airtel. Bharti Enterprises and Singtel hold 50.56 percent and 49.44 percent stakes in BTL, respectively. Bharti Telecom, in turn, owns 35.80 percent of Bharti Airtel.

Airtel India is the second-largest provider of mobile telephony services in India after Jio and the second-largest provider of fixed-line telephony. It also provides broadband and subscription television services. These services are offered under the Airtel brand.

=== Broadband ===
Airtel provides broadband internet access through fibre, DSL, internet leased lines, and MPLS (Multi Protocol Label Switching) solutions, along with IPTV and fixed-line telephone services. Until 18 September 2004, Bharti offered fixed-line telephony and broadband services under the Touchtel brand. Subsequently, all telecom services, including fixed-line services, were consolidated under the Airtel brand. As of June 2019, Airtel provided telemedia services in 99 cities. As of 30 June 2019, Airtel had 2.342 million broadband subscribers.

In May 2012, Airtel Broadband and several other Indian internet service providers temporarily blocked access to file-sharing websites such as Vimeo, Megavideo, and The Pirate Bay without providing prior legal notice to customers.

In June 2011, The Economic Times reported that Airtel merged its telemedia business with its mobile and direct-to-home (DTH) operations.

=== Digital television ===
Airtel's digital television business provides direct-to-home (DTH) television services across India under the brand name Airtel digital TV. Services commenced on 9 October 2008. As of June 2019, the service had approximately 16.027 million subscribers.

=== Banking ===
Airtel Payments Bank was launched in January 2017.

=== Business ===
Airtel Business provides enterprise connectivity and communication services.

=== Airtel Digital Ltd ===
Airtel Digital Ltd is a subsidiary of Bharti Airtel that manages its digital services and platforms, including Wynk Music, Airtel Xstream, Airtel Thanks, the Mitra Payments platform, Airtel Ads, Airtel IQ, Airtel Secure, and Airtel Cloud.

==== Wynk Music ====
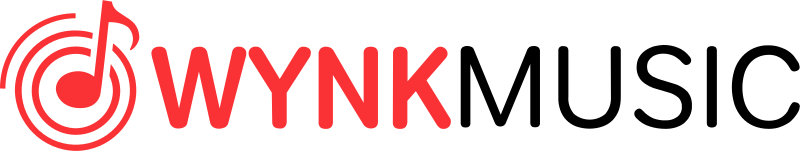
Wynk Music

Wynk Music was an Indian music streaming service and a digital distributor in 14 languages. Launched on 1 September 2014 by Airtel Digital Limited, and the digital wing of Bharti Airtel. It was available in India, Sri Lanka, and 15 African countries. It had a program that helped independent artists launch their music. It provided mentorship, distribution support, and the ability to earn from every stream. The app was initially available only to Airtel subscribers and also other subscriber, but it was later made available to everyone in 2017. Wynk Music's service was bundled with some Airtel subscription plans in India and alongside other subscription-based music streaming services. The company partnered with Dolby Laboratories, through which it offered users Dolby Atmos technolog's immersive audio of Dolby Atmos. In late August 2024, Bharti Airtel decided to partner with Apple to offer Apple Music as their replacement for their current Premium subscription, thus they decided to shut down Wynk Music while all of the staff has relocated to their telecom division. In December 2024, the app was shut down.

== International presence ==
Coverage map of Bharti Airtel across 17 countries. Current operations Joint venture/Minority shareholder Former operations

Airtel is the second-largest mobile operator in the world by subscriber base and has a commercial presence in 17 countries.

Its area of operations include:

- The South Asia:
  - Airtel India, in India
  - Dialog Axiata (10.36%), in Sri Lanka
  - Robi, in Bangladesh
- Airtel Africa, which operates in 14 African countries:
  - Chad, Democratic Republic of the Congo, Congo, Gabon, Kenya, Madagascar, Malawi, Niger, Nigeria, Rwanda, Seychelles, Tanzania, Uganda and Zambia.

Airtel operates in the following countries:

Country	Operator name	Remarks
Bangladesh	Robi	Airtel Bangladesh was merged into Robi Axiata Limited in which Bharti Airtel holds a 28.18% stake.
Chad	airtel Chad	Airtel Chad is the No. 1 operator with 69% market share.
Democratic Republic of the Congo	airtel DRC	Airtel was the top mobile provider by sales at the end of 2024.
Gabon	airtel Gabon	Airtel Gabon has 829,000 customers and its market share stood at 61%.
India	airtel India	As of March 2024, Airtel India had about 352 million mobile subscribers, making it India's second-largest mobile operator.
Kenya	Airtel Kenya	Airtel Kenya is the second largest operator and has 8.6 million subscribers.
Madagascar	airtel Madagascar	As of early 2025, Airtel Madagascar has around 4.9 million mobile subscribers, and its market share is estimated at 7%.
Malawi	airtel Malawi	Airtel Malawi is the market leader with a market share of 72%.
Niger	airtel Niger	Airtel Niger is the market leader with a 68% market share.
Nigeria	airtel Nigeria	Airtel Nigeria is the third largest operator in Nigeria with a 26.92% market share and 50.2 million customers.
Republic of the Congo	airtel Congo B	Airtel Congo is the market leader with a 55% market share.
Rwanda	airtel Rwanda	Airtel launched services in Rwanda on 30 March 2012. As of 2024–25, network coverage in Rwanda has reached over 95% 4G population coverage.
Seychelles	airtel Seychelles	Airtel is the leading comprehensive telecommunications services provider with over 55% market share of mobile market in Seychelles.
Sri Lanka	Dialog Axiata	Airtel Sri Lanka commenced operations on 12 January 2009. It had about 1.8 million mobile customers at the end of 2010. On 27 June 2024, Airtel Sri Lanka merged with Dialog Axiata. Bharthi Airtel currently holds a 10.36% stake in Dialog Axiata.
Tanzania	airtel Tanzania	Airtel Tanzania is the market leader with a 38% market share.
Uganda	airtel Uganda	Airtel Uganda stands as the No. 2 operator with a market share of 38%.
Zambia	airtel Zambia	Airtel Zambia is the second market leader in Zambia with a 40% market share of the mobile network sector.

=== Africa ===
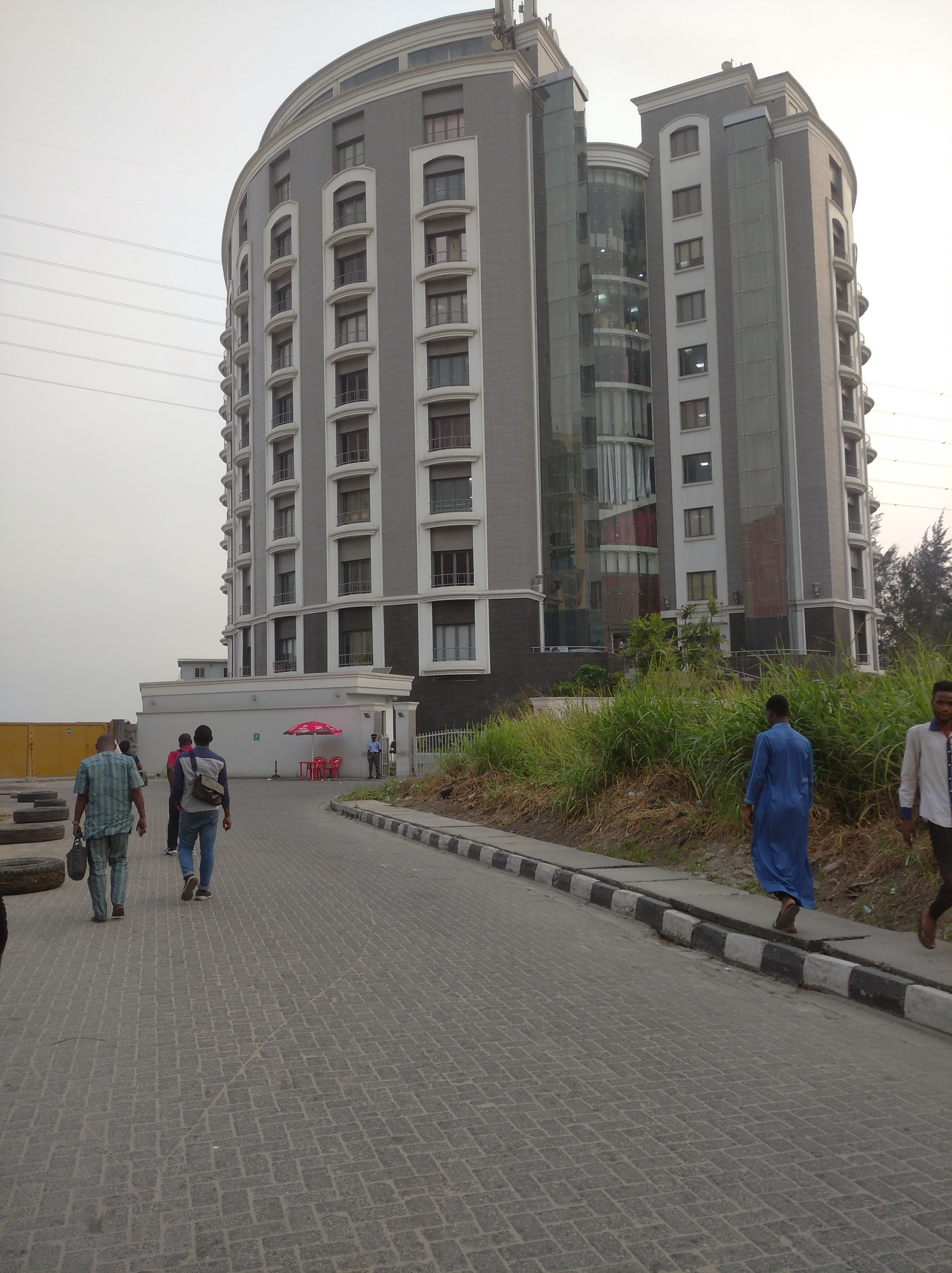
Airtel Nigeria headquarters in Banana Island, Lagos.

Airtel Tanzania headquarters in Dar es Salaam.

Airtel Africa is a subsidiary of Bharti Airtel, which provides telecommunications and Mobile Payment services in 14 countries in Africa, primarily in East, Central, and West Africa. Airtel Nigeria is the most profitable unit of Airtel Africa, due to its cheap data plans in Nigeria. As of March 2019, Airtel had over 99 million subscribers on the continent. It is listed on the London Stock Exchange and is a constituent of the FTSE 250 Index.

On 8 June 2010, Bharti Airtel completed the purchase of mobile operations in 15 African countries from Zain, a Kuwaiti operator.

On 11 August 2010, Bharti Airtel announced that it would acquire Telecom Seychelles for US$62 million.

On 15 August 2017, Bharti Airtel and Millicom's Tigo in Ghana merged to form new company AirtelTigo. On 27 October 2020, Airtel announced that it planned to exit its business in Ghana, and that it had entered into "advanced stages of discussions" for sale of shares in AirtelTigo to the Government of Ghana.

==== Sale to Orange ====
On 13 January 2016, France-based Orange SA and Bharti Airtel inked a deal to sell Airtel's operations in Burkina Faso and Sierra Leone to Orange. On 19 July 2016, Airtel completed the deal.

=== Bangladesh ===
Airtel Bangladesh Ltd. was a GSM-based cellular operator in Bangladesh. Airtel was the sixth mobile phone carrier to enter the Bangladesh market, and originally launched commercial operations under the brand name "Warid Telecom" on 10 May 2007. Warid Telecom International LLC, an Abu Dhabi–based consortium, sold a majority 70% stake in the company to India's Bharti Airtel Limited for US$300 million.

On 16 November 2016, Airtel Bangladesh was merged into Robi as a product brand of Robi Axiata, where Robi Axiata Limited is the licensee of the Airtel brand in Bangladesh. Robi at present is a joint venture between Axiata Group of Malaysia, Bharti Airtel of India and NTT Docomo Inc. of Japan. Axiata holds 68.7% controlling stake in the entity, Bharti holds 25% while the remaining 6.3% is held by NTT Docomo of Japan.

=== Sri Lanka ===
Bharti Airtel Lanka (Pvt) Ltd is a subsidiary of Bharti Airtel Limited.

Airtel Lanka commenced commercial operations of services on 13 January 2009. Granted a license in 2007 in accordance with the Sri Lanka Telecommunications Act No. 25 of 1991, it is also a registered company under the Board of Investment of Sri Lanka. Under the license, the company provides digital mobile services to Sri Lanka. This is inclusive of voice telephony, voicemail, data services and GSM-based services. All of these services are provided under the Airtel brand.

=== Channel Islands: Jersey and Guernsey ===
On 1 May 2007, Jersey Airtel and Guernsey Airtel, both wholly owned subsidiaries of the Bharti Group, announced they would launch mobile services in the British Crown Dependency islands of Jersey and Guernsey under the brand name Airtel-Vodafone after signing an agreement with Vodafone. Airtel-Vodafone operates a 4G network in Jersey and Guernsey.

=== Subscriber base ===
Bharti Airtel has about 496.91 million subscribers worldwide as of June 2022. The numbers include mobile services subscribers in 17 countries and Indian Telemedia services and Digital services subscribers.

=== One Network ===
One Network is a mobile phone network that allows Airtel customers to use the service in a number of countries at the same price as their home network. Customers can place outgoing calls at the same rate as their local network, and incoming calls are free. As of 2014, the service is available in Bangladesh, Burkina Faso, Chad, Democratic Republic of Congo, Congo Brazzaville, Gabon, Ghana, India, Kenya, Madagascar, Niger, Nigeria, Rwanda, Seychelles, Sierra Leone, Sri Lanka, Tanzania, Uganda, and Zambia only for international roamers from Airtel Africa.

== Joint ventures and agreements ==
=== Airtel-Vodafone ===
On 1 May 2007, Jersey Airtel and Guernsey Airtel, both wholly owned subsidiaries of the Bharti Group, announced they would launch mobile services in the British Crown Dependencies islands of Jersey and Guernsey under the brand name Airtel-Vodafone after signing an agreement with Vodafone. Airtel-Vodafone operates a 4G network in Jersey and Guernsey.

=== Airtel-Ericsson ===
In July 2011, Bharti signed a five-year agreement with Ericsson, who will manage and optimize Airtel's mobile networks in Africa. Ericsson will modernize and upgrade Airtel's mobile networks in Africa with the latest technology including its multi-standard RBS 6000 base station. As part of the modernization, Ericsson will also provide technology consulting, network planning & design and network deployment. Ericsson has been the managed services and network technology partner in Asian operations.

== Sponsorship ==
On 9 May 2009, Airtel signed a major deal with Manchester United FC. As a result of the deal, Airtel had the rights to broadcast the matches played by the team to its customers.

Bharti Airtel signed a five-year deal with ESPN Star Sports to become the title sponsor of the Champions League Twenty20 cricket tournament.

Airtel also signed a deal to be the title sponsor of the Formula One Indian Grand Prix.

Airtel sponsored the 2018–21 FIA GT World Cup.

Airtel signed a deal to be the title sponsor of the I-League for 2013–14 I-League.

Airtel is also the main sponsor of Airtel Super Singer and Airtel Super Singer Junior since 2006, which are currently broadcast on Star Vijay.

== Signature tune ==
The signature tune of Airtel is composed by Indian musician A. R. Rahman. The tune became the world's most downloaded mobile music, with over 150 million downloads. Rahman along with Anu Malik re-used the same tune in a 2004 Kannada movie Love. A new version of the song was released on 18 November 2010, as part of the rebranding of the company. This version was also composed by Rahman.

== Awards and recognitions ==
Bharti Airtel has been featured in Forbes Asia's Fab 50 list, rated amongst the best-performing companies in the world in the BusinessWeek IT 100 list 2007, and voted as India's most innovative company in a survey by The Wall Street Journal.

== Controversies ==
=== Net neutrality debate ===
In February 2014, Gopal Vittal, CEO of Airtel's India operations, said that companies offering free messaging apps like Skype, Line and WhatsApp should be regulated similar to telecom operators. In August 2014, TRAI rejected a proposal from telecom companies to make messaging application firms share part of their revenue with the carriers or the government. In November 2014, TRAI began investigating if Airtel was implementing preferential access by offering special internet packs which allowed WhatsApp and Facebook data at rates that were lower than its standard data rates. The statements of Chua Sock Koong, Group CEO of Singtel and also a shareholder (32.15%) of Bharti Airtel share similar statements about the Anti-Net Neutrality position.

In December 2014, Airtel changed its service terms for 2G and 3G data packs so that VoIP data was excluded from the set amount of free data. A standard data charge of 4 paise (0.042¢ US) per 10 KB for 3G service and 10 paise (0.10¢ US) per 10 KB (more than ₹10,000 (US$100) for 1 GB) for 2G service was levied on VoIP data. A few days later, Airtel announced a separate internet pack for VoIP apps, it offered 75 MB for ₹75 (78¢ US) with a validity of 28 days. The TRAI chief Rahul Khullar said that Airtel cannot be held responsible for violating net neutrality because India has no regulation that demands net neutrality. Airtel's move faced criticism on social networking sites like Facebook, Twitter and Reddit. Later on 29 December 2014, Airtel announced that it would not be implementing the planned changes, pointing out that there were reports that TRAI would be soon releasing a consultation paper on the issue.

In April 2015, Airtel announced the "Airtel Zero" scheme. Under the scheme, app firms will sign a contract and Airtel will provide the apps for free to its customers. The reports of Flipkart, an e-commerce firm, joining the "Airtel Zero" scheme drew negative response. People began to give the one-star rating to its app on Google Play. Following the protest, Flipkart decided to pull out of Airtel Zero. The e-commerce giant confirmed the news in an official statement, saying, "We will be walking away from the ongoing discussions with Airtel for their platform Airtel Zero."

In October 2016, India's telecom regulator TRAI recommended imposing a combined penalty of ₹3,050 crore (equivalent to ₹48 billion or US$500 million in 2026) on three mobile network operators — Vodafone, Bharti Airtel and Idea Cellular — for denying interconnection to Reliance Jio Infocomm (Jio), the latest entrant into India's telecom service.

=== User privacy ===
In June 2015, a code used by the company was accused of compromising subscribers' privacy.

=== eKYC licence suspension ===
The Unique Identification Authority of India (UIDAI) suspended Bharti Airtel and Airtel Payments Bank Limited's licence for eKYC of Aadhaar on 16 December 2017, following complaints from customers that their accounts were being opened without their consent. Some even received their LPG subsidies in their Airtel Payments Bank accounts.

=== Airtel app security flaw ===
On 8 December 2019, a serious security fault was detected that existed in Airtel's API. The bug allowed potential threat actors to "fetch sensitive user information of any Airtel subscriber." Ehraz Ahmed was the first to observe this security vulnerability, and he released a video demonstrating a script being used to obtain information from the Airtel's mobile app's API. On his blog, Ehraz concluded that such flaw can result in "revealed information like first and last name, gender, email, date of birth, address, subscription information, device capability information for 4G, 3G & GPRS, network information, activation date, user type (prepaid or postpaid) and current IMEI number", all being very sensitive user information. Airtel acknowledged the issue and it was fixed shortly after.

== See also ==
- Airtel Africa
- Airtel India
- Airtel Sri Lanka
- Bharti Enterprises
- List of mobile network operators
- List of telecom companies in India
- Singtel
