= 2014 Quetta Airbase attack =

Terrorist attack on Quetta Airport

- Part of the War in North-West Pakistan
- Location: 30°11′N 67°00′E; Quetta, Balochistan, Pakistan
- Date: 15 August 2014; 12 years ago (Pakistan Standard Time)
- Target: Khalid–Samungli airbases, Pakistan Air Force
- Attack type: Mass shooting
- Deaths: 12
- Injuries: 12
- Perpetrator: Tehrik-i-Taliban
- No. of participants: ~13

The 2014 Quetta airbase attack occurred on 15 August 2014, when approximately 13 Tehrik-i-Taliban militants attempted to storm two airbases of the Pakistan Army and Pakistan Air Force; PAF Base Samungli and Khalid Airbase, both located in Quetta, Balochistan, Pakistan. The attack was largely unsuccessful as Pakistani security forces foiled the attempt following a major armed engagement between the two sides which resulted in the deaths of 12 militants, while 12 people were injured, including one attacker and 11 security personnel.

== Background ==
PAF Base Samungli is an airbase of the Pakistan Air Force (PAF), located near the Quetta International Airport in the Pakistani province of Balochistan. The PAF No. 17 Squadron and No. 23 Squadron are based in Samungli, which has been used as a main operating base since the 1970s. The Samungli airbase was also used by the United States to conduct military logistics operations for the post-9/11 War in Afghanistan. PAF Base Khalid is another airbase located some 12 kilometres (7.5 mi) away from PAF Base Samungli.

== Attack ==
The attack took place in the early hours of 15 August 2014, when Tehrik-i-Taliban militants, armed with automatic weapons, explosives and RPGs, attempted to storm PAF Base Samungli and PAF Base Khalid. According to a military spokesperson, Pakistani security forces pre-emptively engaged the terrorists during their infiltration attempt. Heavy contingents of police and security forces responded after an intense gunfight erupted between the terrorists and airbase personnel, during which explosives were extensively used. Lieutenant-General Nasir Khan Janjua of the Pakistan Army Southern Command (also based near Quetta) stated that six dead militants were found in PAF Base Khalid while another six were found in PAF Base Samungli. A wounded militant was captured by security forces and subsequently shifted for medical treatment and interrogation. 11 Pakistani security personnel were also wounded in the attack, and shifted for medical treatment. The Pakistan Armed Forces' Inter-Services Public Relations media wing later released a conclusive statement saying that both airbases had been secured.

== Responsibility ==
Ghalib Mehsud, commander of the Tehrik-i-Taliban's Fidayeen Islam wing, claimed responsibility for the attack, and in a threat to the Government of Pakistan, stated that there will be more attacks in the coming days.

== See also ==
- 2011 PNS Mehran attack
- 2012 Bacha Khan International Airport attack
- 2014 Jinnah International Airport attack
- Quetta attacks
