= Masho Khel =

Village in Khyber Pakhtunkhwa, Pakistan

Masho Khel (Mashokhel) ماشوخیل
- Village
- Location within Pakistan Location within Khyber Pakhtunkhwa
- Coordinates: 33°54′37″N 71°30′09″E
- Country: Pakistan
- Province: Khyber Pakhtunkhwa
- District: Peshawar District
- Tehsil: Pishtakhara

Government
  - Type: Tehsil Local Government, Pishtakhara
  - Tehsil Chairman: Muhammad Haroon Sifat
  - Village Chairmen: Amjid Khan and Qari Waqas Khan
  - Village Secretaries: Malik Rifaqat Khan and Saif Ul Islam

Population (2023)
  - Total: 30,492
- Time zone: UTC+5 (Pakistan Standard Time)
- Postal Code: 24810

Masho Khel or Mashokhel (in Pashto and Urdu: ماشوخیل) is a historic village in the capital district of Peshawar in the province of Khyber Pakhtunkhwa, Pakistan. The village is situated about 13 km south of the Peshawar cantonment.

The spoken language in the village is Pashto, and the people belong to the Pashtun tribe Mohmand.

The Sufi and philosophical poet of the 17th century, Abdul Hamid Baba, was from this village.

== Administrative division ==
Masho Khel is part of Pakistan National Assembly seat NA-30 Peshawar-III and Khyber Pakhtunkhwa Assembly seat PK-78 Peshawar-X. It falls under the jurisdiction of Badaber police station. There are two village councils in Masho Khel. The village comes under the local administration of union council (UC 58) Sheikhan, Tehsil Pishtakhara.

== Education ==
The literacy rate in Masho Khel is very low. The major reasons are poverty and limited access to schools. Masho Khel has a public high school for boys which, along with many other schools, was bombed by militants.

For girls, a public high school has recently been built. There are also some private schools, but students usually attend schools in Peshawar city and the cantonment. A group of volunteers has been helping students under the name Maths Volunteers.

== Healthcare ==
The village has no major hospital, and only the Basic Health Unit (BHU) is functional. However, there are a few private practitioners in the village. The nearest major hospitals, about 10 km away, are Hayatabad Medical Complex Peshawar, Khyber Teaching Hospital, and Lady Reading Hospital.

== History ==
Masho Khel is well known for a historic event that took place in 1847, when the people of the village refused to pay revenue to Major George Lawrence of the British Raj.

== People ==
People of Masho Khel are mostly farmers and labourers. However, there are also a significant number of people working as teachers, civil servants, and armed forces personnel.

== Major crops ==
The main crop farmed in the village is wheat. Other crops include maize, peas, sunflower, garlic, and a variety of decorative flowers.

== Sports ==
There are no proper grounds for sports. However, street cricket and volleyball are widely played in the village.

== Major problems ==
Poverty, education, healthcare, clean water, and electricity load shedding are major issues in the village.

The rate of girls' education is very low, possibly due to the limited number of girls' schools. Only recently have the first middle and high schools been constructed for girls. Some primary girls' schools were bombed by militants.

== Nearby villages ==
Nearby villages include Suleman Khel, Gari Mali Khel, Mushtarzi, Mashogagar, Balarzi, and Badaber.

== Notable people ==
The Sufi and philosophical poet of the 17th century, Abdul Hamid Baba, was from Masho Khel.
