= 2012 Bacha Khan International Airport attack =

Tehrik-i-Taliban attack in Peshawar, Pakistan

- Part of the War in North-West Pakistan
- Location: 33°59′38″N 71°30′53″E; Bacha Khan International Airport, Peshawar, Khyber Pakhtunkhwa, Pakistan
- Date: 15 December 2012 (Pakistan Standard Time)
- Target: Pakistan Air Force Base Peshawar
- Attack type: Mass shooting, rocket attack
- Deaths: 15
- Injuries: 45+
- Perpetrator: Tehrik-i-Taliban Pakistan
- Defenders: Pakistan Army; Khyber Pakhtunkhwa Police
- Motive: Retaliation against military operations

The 2012 Bacha Khan International Airport attack was a coordinated terrorist attack on Bacha Khan International Airport and the adjacent Pakistan Air Force Base (PAF) Peshawar on 15 December 2012 by Tehrik-i-Taliban terrorists in Peshawar, Khyber Pakhtunkhwa, Pakistan.

== Background ==
=== Airport ===
Bacha Khan International Airport is Peshawar's main civilian airport. It also contains the Pakistan Air Force Base of Peshawar. The airport is a major passenger hub of Pakistan and is the fourth busiest airport of the country. The airbase serves as the headquarters for PAF's Northern Air Command.

=== Previous incidents ===
Bacha Khan International Airport is the most vulnerable strategic airport of Pakistan due to it being near the tribal areas of Pakistan bordering Afghanistan and jointly being used by both Pakistan Air Force and Pakistan Civil Aviation Authority. Bacha Khan International Airport is often considered to be most targeted airport by the terrorist organizations in the world. It had been previously attacked on 26 December 2006 when a bomb planted outside the airport in a car on Khyber Road exploded. Then on 28 April 2007 a small bomb exploded inside airport's canteen with no casualties. In addition to these attacks there were several other attacks near the airport throughout the 21st century. Most of the attacks were done by Tehrik-i-Taliban as a retaliation for the military operations against them.

=== Threat of upcoming attack ===
It was speculated that another Pakistan Air Force Base will be attacked since there was a recent attack on Minhas air base on 16 August 2012. Before the attack, a teenage would-be suicide bomber was also captured by police on the ring road near the airport. Police investigation determined that the boy was sent to the airport once before by the terrorist organization. All signs pointed to an upcoming attack due to which security was already heightened at the Bacha Khan Airport.

== Attack ==
At around 8:30 pm in the night of 15 December 2012, five rockets were fired at the Bacha Khan International Airport. Three of the rockets struck the outer wall of the airport and the remaining two rockets hit a nearby guest house and a car. The attack was carried out from the western side of the airport which was more vulnerable. After penetration of the outer boundary walls, terrorists used two vehicles loaded with automatic weapons and explosives to try to enter the base but one of the vehicle exploded before it could even enter the airport. After which an intense 30 minute gun battle between security forces and the terrorists ensued. Amidst the attack, a Pakistan International Airlines (PIA) aircraft with passengers on board was parked on the apron of the airport. The passengers were safely escorted to the airport lounge by security forces. The crossfire came to an end when 5 of the terrorists were eliminated by security forces and remaining fled from the airport.

== Aftermath ==
=== Bomb disposal ===
Security forces found three suicide vest near the vehicles and eight bombs. Out of the eight bombs five were detonated by the bomb squad after the attack.

=== Police raid ===
On 16 December 2012, the day after the attack, upon receiving hints, police raided a nearby building to the airport where the remaining terrorists had supposedly fled. As an outcome of the raid, three more terrorist were eliminated in a shootout and another two blew themselves off by detonating their suicide vests. One police commander was also killed and another two were injured.

=== Repairs ===
After the attack, security forces made a temporary curtain to hide the broken portion of the wall, while the wall was being reconstructed. No compensation were given by the government to nearby damaged residential buildings.

=== Casualties ===
The airport attack, combined with a subsequent police raid, resulted in 15 fatalities and 48 injuries. Among the deceased were 10 terrorists, 4 civilians, and 1 police officer. 23 flights were also halted as the airport remained closed for 17 hours.

== Responsibility ==
=== Tehrik-i-Taliban's claim ===
Initially no group claimed responsibility for the attack, but most had their suspicions on Pakistani Taliban. Later, after the attack on the airport, Tehrik-e-Taliban Pakistan did indeed claimed responsibility for the attack. Taliban spokesman Ehsanullah Ehsan told AFP news agency: "Our target was fighter jets and helicopter gunships and soon we will target them again" from an undisclosed location. Additionally, Ehsan also stated "We have planned more attacks on Pakistani forces and its installation as it works to please the USA." The assault was reportedly launched from a nearby village named Abdra, according to a PAF spokesman, who added that a joint counter-terrorism operation by several security agencies was under way.

=== Islamic Movement of Uzbekistan's Involvement ===
The BBC reported that the Islamic Movement of Uzbekistan (IMU) also played a role in the attack which had found shelter in Southern Waziristan after American led Invasion of Afghanistan. Several militants appeared to be members of IMU and were of Chechen descent. One such chechen militant was recognized as a resident of Chechnya due to tattoos on his body. Few months after the attack, on March 15, 2013 Pakistan officially declared Islamic Movement of Uzbekistan as a terrorist organization and took major steps to eliminate them from the region.

== Reactions ==
=== Official statements ===
A statement made by the PAF spokesman Group Captain Tariq Mahmood stated that only the outer wall of the airfield had been damaged and no terrorist penetrated the premises.

Defence minister Naveed Qamar said the attack was well planned out and terrorists were heavily armed, however the response by the security forces ensured there had been no damage to property or loss of life within the airport.

Civil Aviation Authority of Pakistan spokesman Pervez George stated that the airport was closed after the attack began and all flights en route to Peshawar were diverted to Islamabad and Lahore.

=== Public outcry ===
Many families of the nearby residential area left their damaged houses as they were no longer habitable. Many people criticized the government for not providing compensation for the damages.

=== Military operations ===
The Bacha Khan airport attack prompted Pakistani military operations in the tribal regions such as Operation Rah-e-Shahadat in Khyber agency and Operation Zarb-e-Azb in North-Waziristan Agency. By 2016, civilian deaths due to terrorism declined to 600 from a high of 3000 in 2012.

== Subsequent Terrorist Attacks ==
Despite the many operations conducted by Security forces in order to eliminate terrorists from the region, the airport continued to be a major target for terrorist attacks. After 2012 attack, terrorists attacked the airport again on February 26, 2014 when a series of rockets were targeted at peshawer city some of which fell into the airport but resulted in no casualties. Then, Just few months later, airport was attacked again by terrorists on June 24, 2014 when PIA airline's plane PK-756 with 178 passengers was fired upon from outside the airport which resulted in one death and several injuries.

== See also ==
- Terrorist incidents in Pakistan in 2012
- 2014 Quetta Airbase attack
- 2012 Minhas Airbase attack
