= Axiata =

Malaysian multinational telecommunications company

Axiata Group Berhad
- Formerly: TM International Berhad (12 June 1992–2 April 2009)
- Type: Public
- Traded as: MYX: 6888
- ISIN: MYL6888OO001
- Industry: Telecommunications
- Founded: 12 June 1992; 34 years ago
- Founder: Azman Mokhtar
- Headquarters: Axiata Tower, 9 Jalan Stesen Sentral 5, Kuala Lumpur Sentral, 50470 Kuala Lumpur, Malaysia
- Areas served: Asia
- Key people: Tan Sri Shahril Ridza Ridzuan (Chairman); Vivek Sood (CEO)
- Products: Mobile network; network infrastructure; digital internet
- Revenue: ▼RM24.203 billion (2020)
- Operating income: ▼RM1.171 billion (2020)
- Net income: ▼RM624.045 million (2020)
- Total assets: ▲RM67.961 billion (2020)
- Total equity: ▲RM23.879 billion (2020)
- Owners: Khazanah Nasional (36.74%); Permodalan Nasional Berhad (18.39%); Employees Provident Fund (17.03%)
- Number of employees: >25,000 (groupwide)
- Divisions: Axiata Digital Labs
- Subsidiaries: see this list
- Website: www.axiata.com

Axiata Group Berhad (formerly known as TM International Berhad) is a Malaysian multinational telecommunications conglomerate with extensive operations in Asia.

== The group ==
Axiata's primary business is investment holding and provisioning of telecommunication and consultancy services on an international scale. It mainly focuses on emerging markets in ASEAN and South Asia.

Formerly known as TM International Berhad (TMI), the company was incorporated on 12 June 1992 and was the mobile and international operations arm of Telekom Malaysia Berhad (TM). Following the de-merger of TMI from TM, the company was listed on the Main Board of Bursa Malaysia Securities Berhad in 2008. On 2 April 2009, TMI underwent a rebranding exercise, launching its new name, Axiata, and a new logo.

Its new tagline, Advancing Asia, was also launched, reflecting the company's focus on expansion within Asia.

Axiata controls interests in mobile operators across Malaysia, Indonesia, Sri Lanka, Bangladesh and Cambodia. The Group also has stakes in non-mobile telecommunication operations in Thailand and Pakistan.

Their Board of Directors includes:

- Tan Sri Shahril Ridza Ridzuan - Chairman, Independent Non-Executive Director
- Vivek Sood - Group Chief Executive Officer and Managing Director
- Dato' Dr. Nik Ramlah Nik Mahmood - Senior Independent Non-Executive Director
- Dr. David Robert Dean - Independent Non-Executive Director
- Khoo Gaik Bee - Independent Non-Executive Director
- Maya Hari - Independent Non-Executive Director
- Amrit Kaur - Independent Non-Executive Director
- Thayaparan S. Sangarapillai - Independent Non-Executive Director
- Dr. Farid Mohamed Sani - Non-Independent Non-Executive Director, Representative of Khazanah Nasional Berhad
- Shahin Farouque Jammal Ahmad - Non-Independent Non-Executive Director, Representative of Permodalan Nasional Berhad
- Mohamad Hafiz Kassim - Non-Independent Non-Executive Director, Representative of Employees Provident Fund

== Subsidiary holdings ==
On their website in 2019, it was announced that Axiata had approximately 150 million subscribers across Asia and Group revenue of MYR25.3 billion (US$5.77 billion) in 2018. It was also reported that the company employed 12,000 people throughout eleven countries.

Axiata's mobile subsidiaries and associates operate under the brand name CelcomDigi in Malaysia, XLSmart in Indonesia, Dialog in Sri Lanka, Robi in Bangladesh, and Smart in Cambodia. The company formerly operated under the brand name Ncell in Nepal (acquisition from TeliaSonera completed on 12 April 2016), M1 in Singapore, and Idea in India.

Country	Company	Ownership
Bangladesh	Robi Axiata Limited; Trust Axiata Digital Limited	61.82% 49%
Cambodia	Smart Axiata Co., Ltd	72.48%
Indonesia	PT XLSmart Telecom Sejahtera Tbk	34.80%
Malaysia	CelcomDigi Berhad	33.1%
Sri Lanka	Dialog Axiata PLC	73.75%

On 4 January 2018, Bloomberg reported that Axiata was planning a domestic IPO of its tower subsidiary EDOTCO Group. The IPO was expected to raise as much as $500 million.

On 15 February 2019, Axiata sold off its entire shares in 'M1' to Konnectivity Pte. Ltd. for RM1.65 billion, citing the need for capital reallocation and new priorities in line with its vision to be the Next Generation Digital Champion by 2022.

On 21 June 2021, Axiata, Telenor and Digi agreed to a potential merger of Celcom and Digi to create a stronger telco in Malaysia, coming after advanced discussions that took place two months earlier. The merger was expected to be completed by the end of 2022. The deal was approved by both Celcom and Digi shareholders on 18 November 2022. The merged company would be named CelcomDigi. At completion, Axiata and Telenor would hold equal ownership of 33.1% each in the newly merged company. The merger completed on 30 November 2022, and the new company began operations the next day.

On 1 December 2023, the United Kingdom-based Spectrlite UK Limited acquired 100 percent ownership of Reynolds Holdings Limited from Axiata UK of Axiata Group Berhad. Reynolds owns an 80 percent equity stake in Ncell, a telecom company in Nepal.

== Competitors ==
Axiata Group meets main competitors across the Indonesian market (Telkomsel). In 2019, Axiata held second place in Indonesia. In Bangladesh, Axiata (Robi) also held second place, and the main competitor was Telenor (Grameenphone).

== See also ==
- List of mobile network operators
