= Wateen =

Telecommunication company

Wateen Telecom Limited
- Company type: Unlisted public company
- Industry: Telecommunications
- Founded: 2005; 21 years ago
- Headquarters: Lahore, Pakistan
- Area served: Nationwide (Pakistan)
- Key people: Adil Rashid (CEO); Ghulam Mustafa (CFO); Malik Farhan Haider (CTO)
- Products: Fixedline telephony Broadband internet Fibre-optic communication IT services
- Owner: Abu Dhabi Group
- Website: www.wateen.com

Wateen Telecom (Urdu: وطین ٹیلی کام) is a converged communication services provider based in Lahore, Pakistan, and was a sister concern of Warid Telecom. The company was incorporated in 2005 and began its operations in 2007 with the deployment of the largest fibre optic network in the country.

It was formerly listed on the Karachi Stock Exchange but was delisted after a share buyback in 2013.

== History ==
Wateen Telecom is formed under the auspices of the Abu Dhabi Group; one of the leading business corporations in the Middle East and one of the biggest foreign investors in Pakistan. Initially, in 2007, the company was set up as a "carrier's carrier" providing a fine fibre optic network to mobile companies and offering long-distance and telephony services. In areas where Wateen did not have a fiber network, it offered carriers connectivity through VSAT.

Wateen is the first company in the world to commercially launch WiMAX broadband internet services throughout the country, beginning with 24 major cities in Pakistan in 2007.

Due to the global recession and instability in the economic and political scenario in the country, the FDI in Pakistan slowed, adversely affecting the company. In order to raise capital, Wateen Telecom decided to go public with an IPO, which was oversubscribed at PKR 10. Unfortunately, right after the IPO there came a fall in the share prices and the stock index declined. Realizing the situation, Wateen Telecom underwent a major transformation which also included a change in its management.

In 2013, Qubee, subsidiary of Augere, was merged with Wateen Telcom.

== Operations ==
=== Broadband Internet ===
Wateen has shut down its WiMax network and now only offers Fiber Broadband (HFC/GPON) in areas of Karachi, Lahore and Multan.
