= List of media companies of Bangladesh =

This is a list of notable media companies of Bangladesh.

== B ==
- Beximco

== C ==
- CD Choice

== D ==
- Destiny Group

== E ==
- East West Media Group

== F ==
- Fatman Films

== G ==
- Globe Janakantha Shilpa Paribar

== J ==
- Jaaz Multimedia

== M ==
- Monsoon Films

== P ==
- Ping Pong Entertainment

== T ==
- Tiger Media Limited
