= List of telecommunications companies of Bangladesh =

Company of Bangladesh

This is a list of notable telecommunications companies of Bangladesh.

== A ==
- Airtel

== B ==
- Banglalink

== G ==
- Grameen Telecom
- Grameenphone

== O ==
- Onetel Communication Ltd.

== P ==
- PeoplesTel

== R ==
- RanksTel
- RealVU
- Robi

== S ==
- SAtel

== T ==
- Telebarta
- TeleTalk
