= Telecommunications in Bangladesh =

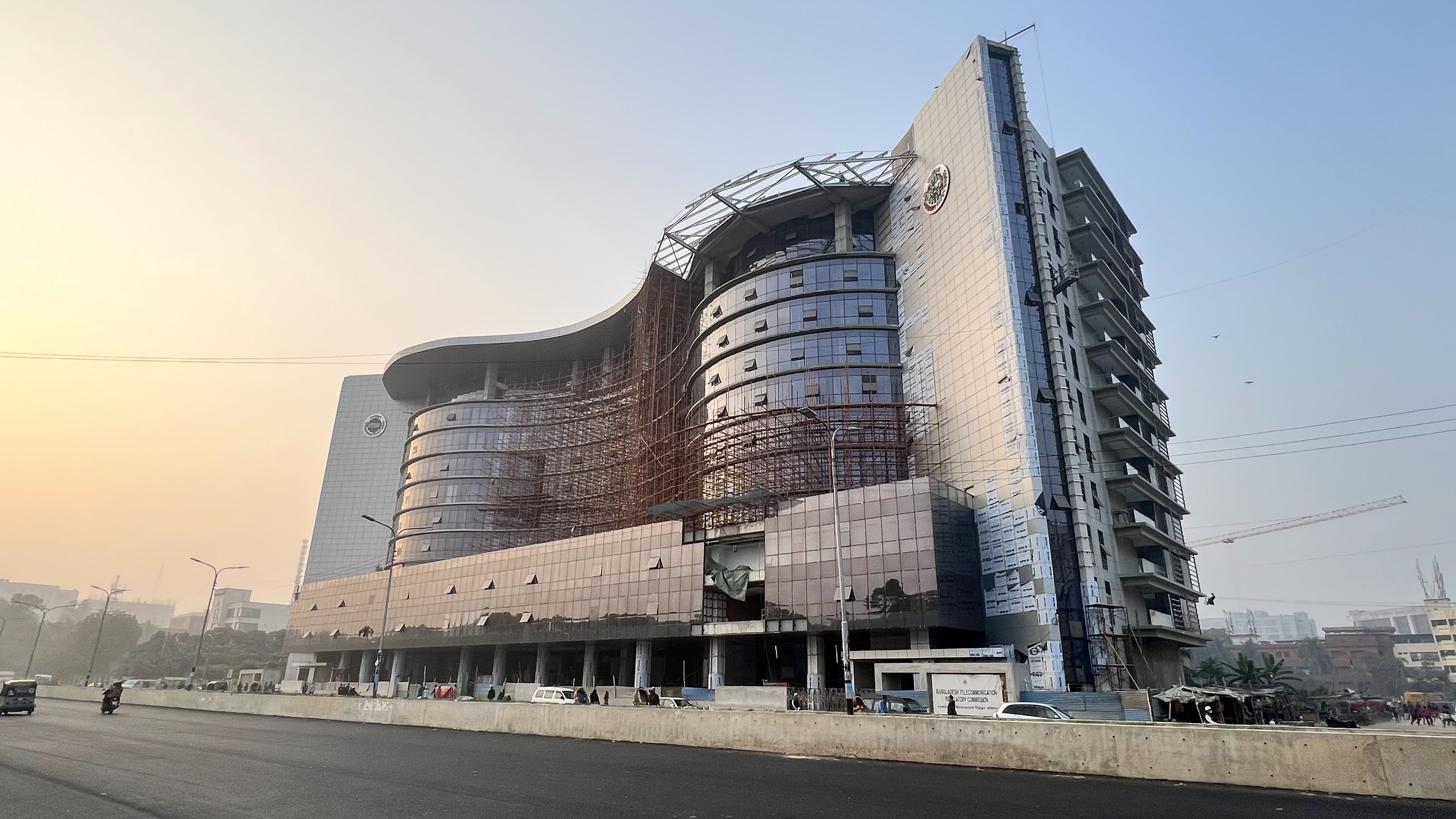
BTRC Bhaban

The telecom sector in Bangladesh is rapidly emerging. Bangladesh Telecommunication Regulatory Commission (BTRC) is the regulatory authority for this sector, overseeing licensing, policy, etc.

The calling code of Bangladesh is +880. There are also several SubCodes.

== History ==
Landmarks in the history of the telecom industry in Bangladesh:

- 1971: Reconstructed as Bangladesh Telegraph and Telephone Department under the Ministry of Posts and Telecommunications.
- 1975: Reconstructed as Telegraph and Telephone Board.
- 1979: Reconstructed as Bangladesh Telegraph and Telephone Board (BTTB) with the right to issue licenses for telecom and wireless services.
- 1981: Digital Telex Exchange in Bangladesh.
- 1983: Automatic Digital ITX started in Dhaka.
- 1985: Coinbox Telephone service was introduced in Bangladesh by BTTB.
- 1989: GENTEX Telegraph messaging service introduced in Bangladesh.
- 1989: Bangladesh Rural Telecom Authority got a license to operate exchanges in 200 Upazilas.
- 1989: Sheba Telecom got license to operate exchanges in 199 Upazilas.
- 1989: Cellular mobile phone company Pacific Bangladesh Telephone Limited and Bangladesh Telecom got license.
- 1995: Card Telephone service introduced in Bangladesh by BTTB and TSS.
- 1995: Regulatory power of BTTB transferred to Ministry (MoPTIT).
- 1995: 2nd and 3rd ITX installed in Dhaka.
- 1996: GrameenPhone got cellular mobile Telephone license.
- 1996: Telecom Malaysia International Bangladesh got cellular mobile license.
- 1998: Telecom Policy.
- 2000: Global Telecom Service (GTS) Telex Exchange venture with British Teleco.
- 2001: Telecommunication Act, to establish Bangladesh Telecommunication Regulatory Commission (BTRC).
- 2002: ICT Policy.
- 2004: Teletalk (BTTB bMobile) cellular mobile launched.
- 2005: Egypt-based Orascom acquired Sheba Telecom
- 2006: NGN introduced in BTTB.
- 2008: BTTB converted into Bangladesh Telecommunications Company Limited (BTCL) with 100% shares owned by Government. The Submarine Cable Project transformed into Bangladesh Submarine Cable Company Limited (BSCCL)
- 2008: Japanese NTT DoCoMo bought 30 percent stake in Aktel
- 2009: Bharti Airtel acquired 70 percent stake in Warid Telecom
- 2009: Internet Protocol Telephony Service Provider (IPTSP) Operators launched.
- 2010: Aktel rebranded to Robi Axiata Limited
- 2012: 3G mobile service is introduced by state owned Teletalk in October.
- 2013: 3G auction held for private companies
- 2014: 64 districts covered with 3G by Teletalk, Grameenphone, Banglalink and Robi
- 2016: Robi and Airtel were merged on 16 November 2016 and Robi set sail as the merged company.
- 2018: 4G auction held for private companies
- 2018: On 19 February 4G mobile service is introduced.
- 2021: On 12 December 5G mobile service is introduced by TeleTalk.
- 2022: On 17 March Unlimited Validity Data service is introduced by TeleTalk.
- 2022: On 31 March 5G auction is held for all Telecom companies.
- 2023: On 1 November, Teletalk and Banglalink jointly introduced the first National Roaming Network with approximately 20,600 towers in Bangladesh.

== Structure ==
Bangladesh Telecom Network Topology

As defined in the National Telecommunications Policy (1998) and the International Long-Distance Telecommunications Services (ILDTS) Policy (2007), all mobile operators must interconnect through Interconnection Exchanges (ICXs), while all international calls are to be routed through International Gateways (IGWs), which connect to both mobile and fixed operators via the ICXs.

The Interconnection Exchange (ICX) will receive all calls from the mobile and fixed operators whenever the call is made to another network and will pass it to the destination network if the call is local, and will pass to the IGWs if the call is international. ICX will also deliver calls received from IGWs where the call is destined.

Below illustrate the structure of interconnection between different interfaces.

== Service providers ==
=== Public switched telephone network ===
The number of public switched telephone network (PSTN) subscribers in Bangladesh as of February 2009 was 1.372 million. PSTN operators in Bangladesh include:

- Banglaphone Ltd.
- BTCL
- Integrated Services Limited (ISL) – branded under the name Sheba Phone
- Jalalabad Telecom Ltd. – branded under the name Bijoy Phone
- Onetel Communication Ltd.
- Ranks Telecom Ltd.
- S.A Telecom System Ltd.
- Westec Ltd.
- WorldTel
- Lenova.com.bd
- Dhaka Telephone Co. Ltd. – Currently off the air, License canceled by BTRC
- National Telecom Ltd. – Currently off the air, License canceled by BTRC
- Peoples Telecommunication and Information Services Ltd. – Currently off the air, License canceled by BTRC
- Tele Barta Ltd. – branded under the name Jubok phone – Currently off air

=== Mobile phone operators ===
There are four mobile phone operators in Bangladesh, operating under the names of Banglalink, Grameenphone, Robi and TeleTalk. The number of mobile phone subscribers in Bangladesh as of April 2015 was 124.705 million, having risen from the February 2009 figure of 45.21 million. As of September, 2022 the number of mobile phone subscriber has risen to 181.43 Million.

=== Long distance operators (as per ILDTS Policy 2007) ===
On 25 February 2008 the Bangladesh Telecommunications Regulatory Commission awarded licenses for two Interconnection Exchanges (ICX), three International Gateways (IGm), and one International Internet Gateway (IIG) to six firms through an open auction in February 2008. The incumbent BTTB got the same licenses too. And after then on 12 April 2012, the Bangladesh Telecommunications Regulatory Commission awarded licenses for twenty-one Interconnection Exchanges (ICX), twenty two International Gateways (IGw), and thirty International Internet Gateway (IIG). Here is the list of all operators:

==== International Gateway (IGW) operators ====
1. Roots Communication
2. Mir Telecom LTD
3. 1Asia Alliance Gateway
4. Bangladesh International Gateway
5. Bangla Tel Ltd
6. Bangla Trac Communications
7. BG Tel
8. BTCL
9. Cel Telecom
10. DBL Telecom
11. DigiCon Telecommunications
12. First Communications
13. Global Voice Telecom
14. HRC Technologies
15. LR Telecom Ltd.
16. Kay Telecommunications
17. Mos5 Tel
18. NovoTel Limited
19. Platinum Communications Ltd
20. RanksTel
21. Ratul Telecom
22. SM Communication
23. SongBird Telecom (formerly Hamid Sourcing)
24. Telex
25. Vision Tel
26. Venus Telecom LTD

==== Interconnection Exchange (ICX) operators ====
1. M & H Telecom LTD
2. MM Communications LTD
3. Jibondhara Solutions Ltd.
4. Summit ICX
5. BTCL
6. Bangla ICX Ltd.
7. Agni ICX
8. CloudTel
9. GAZI Networks Ltd
10. GETCO ICX
11. Imam Network Ltd.
12. Jibondhara ICX
13. Ring Tech Communications Limited
14. MicroTrade ICX
15. Mother Telecommunication
16. New Generation Telecom Ltd
17. Paradise ICX
18. Purple Telecom Limited
19. Crossworld Telecom Ltd.
20. SR Telecom
21. Sheba
22. Softex Communications Ltd.
23. Tele Exchange Ltd.
24. Teleplus Network Ltd
25. Voicetel Ltd.
26. Bantel Limited.
27. Sengupta Telecom

==== International Internet Gateway (IIG) operator ====
1. Aamra Companies
2. 1Asia Alliance Communication
3. Abir Telecommunication
4. Apple Communication
5. Bangla Phone Ltd
6. bdHUB
7. BD Link Communication Ltd
8. BSCCL
9. BTCL
10. Cybergate
11. Delta Infocom
12. Earth Telecommunication
13. Equitel Communications
14. Fiber @ Home
15. Global Fair Communications
16. Greenland Technologies
17. Intraglobe Communications
18. Level3 Carrier
19. ADN International Gateway Limited. Formerly Managewell Communication Ltd
20. Mango Teleservices
21. MaxNet Online
22. NovoCom
23. PeerEx Networks Limited
24. REGO Communications
25. CiTYCOM NETWORK
26. Summit Communications Limited

==== Internet Protocol Telephony Service Provider (IPTSP) operators ====
On 18 August 2009, the Bangladesh Telecommunications Regulatory Commission commenced awarding licenses for IPTSP. IPTSP operators are regulated by the BTRC. Current IPTSP operators in Bangladesh are:

- Nationwide:
1. Royal Green Online Ltd.
2. Systems Solutions & Development Technologies Limited[SSD-TECH]. (prefix-09642)
3. MetroNet Bangladesh Ltd. (prefix-09612)
4. Icon Infotech Ltd. (prefix-09644)
5. Amber IT Ltd. (prefix-09611)
6. Telnet Communication Ltd.
7. Link3 Technologies Ltd. (prefix-09678)
8. BDCOM Online Ltd. (prefix-09666)
9. Access Telecom (BD) Ltd. (prefix-09622)
10. ADN Telecom Ltd. (formerly Advanced Data Network Systems Ltd) (prefix-09610)
11. Agni Systems Ltd. (prefix-09606)
12. Rightsoft Systems
13. Akceycom Ltd.
14. Akij Online Ltd.
15. Bangladesh Export Import Company Ltd.
16. Bangladesh Internet Exchange Ltd.
17. BEXIMCO AND SQUARE (prefix-09609)
18. BRACNet Ltd. (prefix-09677)
19. Broad Band Telecom Services Ltd.
20. BTS Communications (BD) Ltd., branded as UbernetBD
21. Carnival Internet
22. Communication One (Pvt.) Ltd.
23. Connect BD Ltd.
24. Cyber Net Communications
25. dhakaCom Ltd. (prefix-09611)
26. Digital Connectivity Ltd.
27. ERGO Ventures Ltd.
28. Global Access Ltd.
29. HRC Technologies Ltd.
30. Idea Networks And Communications Ltd.
31. IDS Bangladesh
32. Information Services Network Ltd.
33. Innovative Online Ltd.
34. InterCloud Ltd.
35. IS PROS Ltd.
36. MaxNet Online
37. Manor IT Ltd.
38. Link3 Technologies Ltd. (prefix-09678)
39. Nreach Net (Pvt.) Ltd.
40. Pritty International (Pvt) Ltd.
41. Ranks ITT Ltd.
42. X-Net Ltd.
43. TeleBangla Communications Ltd.
44. RED Data (Pvt) Ltd.
45. Triangle Services LTD
46. Premium Connectivity Limited
- Central:
1. Fusion Net
2. Grameen Cybernet Ltd.
3. IT Connect Ltd.
4. J F Optical Services
5. M/s. Media & Multimedia
6. Next Online Ltd. (Nextfone)
7. SADIATEC Ltd.
8. Sine-10 (BD) Ltd.
- Zonal/Divisional:
1. Chittagong Online Ltd.
2. Chittagong Telecom Services Ltd.
3. First n Fast IT Ltd.
4. HN TELECOM
5. SpeedLinks

==== International Terrestrial Cable (ITC) operator ====
1. 1Asia Alliance Communication
2. BD Link Communication Ltd
3. Fiber @ Home
4. Mango Teleservices
5. NovoCom
6. Summit Communications

== Radio ==
Radio broadcast stations: AM 12, FM 12, shortwave 2, community radio 1, Internet radios

Radios: 6.15 million (1997)

The government-owned Betar-Radio Bangladesh operates from Dhaka and other local districts. Currently, private FM radio channels are very popular. They are trying to attract young people by broadcasting music and news. The operating private radio channels include:

- dhakaFM 90.4 FM
- Radio Amber 102.4 FM
- Radio Today 89.6 FM
- Radio Foorti 88.0 FM
- Radio Amar 88.4 FM
- ABC Radio 89.2 FM
- Peoples Radio 91.6 FM

== Television ==
As of 2012, there are 23 broadcast television stations in Bangladesh, including the state-run BTV and BTV World, with 20 million television sets in the country.

The number of private satellite channels are growing. The first private channel in Bangladesh was ATN Bangla. There are 8 full-fledged news channels (ATN News, Channel 24, DBC News, Ekattor, Independent Television, Jamuna Television, News24 and Somoy TV).

== Internet ==
Bangladesh first received Internet access in 1996. In the recent years, Internet usage has rapidly increased. The Bangladesh government imposes a high Internet tariff, stunting the sector's growth, claims Norwegian-owned Telenor. Due to controversy, the Bangladesh government decided to reduce the tariff by 50%.

The Bangladesh's Internet country code is .bd.

As of 2005, more than 180 Internet Service Providers are operating in the country. Internet service providers (ISPs) are regulated by the Bangladesh Telecommunication Regulatory Commission (BTRC).

In April 2010, Akhtaruzzaman Manju, president of the Internet Service Providers' Association of Bangladesh, told Xinhua that the country's six mobile phone operators and Internet Service Providers have so far provided over 800,000 Internet connections. "We've estimated that nearly 10 million people in the country are using 800,000 internet connections on a shared basis," he said, adding the number of Internet users in the country is increasing yearly by around 15-16 percent.

A 2009 study by the Boston Consulting Group found that the number of Internet subscribers in Bangladesh is likely to reach 18.3 million by 2020, equivalent to a 32 percent household Internet penetration, which will result in a 2.6 percent contribution to the country's GDP while creating 129,000 more jobs, the research added.

=== Broadband Internet access ===
Though broadband Internet access is available, the cost of high-speed connection is higher than in other south Asian countries. Broadband Internet and e-commerce in Bangladesh is progressing slowly. WiMAX service is now available from some Internet service providers. In Bangladesh broadband is legally defined as 128/128 kbit/s, which is not in line with ITU standards.

== Satellite ==
There are six satellite Earth stations, including Talimabad, and Betbunia. Bangladesh sent its first satellite, Bangabandhu-1, into space on May 11, 2018.

Starlink launched in the country with satellite internet connctivity option in 2025.

== Submarine cables ==
Bangladesh is connected to SEA-ME-WE 4 or SMW-4 (South-East Asia – Middle East – Western Europe 4) and SEA-ME-WE 5 submarine cable systems. The landing site of the SMW-4 Bangladesh branch is located in Cox's Bazar and the landing site of the SMW-5 Bangladesh branch is located in Kuakata. The two submarine cables provide the country with redundancy to support uninterrupted Internet and long-distance communications and also with a huge bandwidth. Bangladesh Submarine Cable Company Limited is the only submarine cable operator in Bangladesh.

== See also ==
- Commonwealth Telecommunications Organisation
- Doel (laptop)
- Media of Bangladesh
