= Internet in Bangladesh =

The Internet in Bangladesh has witnessed significant growth despite facing many constraints in expanding Internet access and use. Development of the Internet and information technology is a high government priority. In 2025, Internet users in Bangladesh increased to 92 million with internet penetration at 53%.

On 19 February 2018, Bangladesh started the 4G network service.

== Statistics ==
- Internet users: 53% of the population (2024).
- Household penetration: 54.8% (2025).
- Fixed Broadband: 14.6 million (2025).
- Mobile Broadband: 89% (2026).
- Internet hosts: 109.3 thousand (2017).
- Mobile social media penetration: 77.3% (2025).
- Internet subscriptions: 135.94 million (June 2026).
- Mobile phone subscriptions: 189.83 million (June 2026).

== Evolution ==
Starting in the early 1990s, Bangladesh had dialup access to e-mail using the Bulletin Board Systems (BBSs) of a few local providers, but the number of users did not total more than 500. Users were charged by the kilobyte and email was transferred from the BBS service providers to the rest of the world by international dialup using UUCP.

In June 1996 the first VSAT base data circuit in the country was commissioned and the Bangladesh Telegraph and Telephone Board (BTTB) granted licenses to two Internet service providers (ISPs). In subsequent years more liberal government policies led to a rapid expansion of the industry, resulting in over 180 registered ISPs by 2005. ISPs are currently regulated by the Bangladesh Telecommunication Regulatory Commission (BTRC) through the Bangladesh Telecommunications Act.

In May 2006 Bangladesh inaugurated new submarine cable optic fiber connectivity as part of the 16-country consortium SEA-ME-WE 4 project. The landing station is in Cox's Bazar, the southern city near the Bay of Bengal. In July 2008 the Submarine Cable Project was transformed into the company Bangladesh Submarine Cable Company Limited (BSCCL), which is now responsible for all services related to the submarine cable.

=== Recent Developments (2018-2025) ===
The internet landscape in Bangladesh has transformed dramatically since the late 2010s. On 19 February 2018, Bangladesh officially launched 4G network services, marking a significant milestone in mobile internet connectivity.

By June 2025, Bangladesh reached 188.45 million mobile phone subscribers, with Grameenphone leading at 86.51 million subscribers, followed by Robi (57.40 million), Banglalink (37.95 million), and Teletalk (6.59 million). Internet subscribers grew exponentially to 133.61 million by June 2025, comprising 119.29 million mobile internet users and 14.32 million ISP/PSTN subscribers.

The Bangladesh Bureau of Statistics reported in 2025 that 54.8% of households had internet access, a significant increase from 43.6% in 2023.

Network coverage expanded significantly, with 4G coverage reaching 100% and 3G coverage at 99.80% by 2025. Internet penetration reached 44.5% in 2025. The communication services market revenue was projected to reach US$4.9 billion in 2025, dominated by mobile data with a projected market volume of US$2.5 billion.

Infrastructure development continued to be a priority, with industry leaders at the TowerCo Build Forward Forum 2025 emphasizing the need for policy reform, infrastructure resilience, and cross-sector collaboration. The forum highlighted that TowerCos enable over 90% of the country's mobile network coverage and launched the Bangladesh TowerCo Association to drive collective advocacy and regulatory engagement.

According to OpenSignal's February 2025 report, Grameenphone led in overall mobile experience with a video experience score of 57.6 points, followed by Robi (52.7), Banglalink (50.6), and Teletalk (50.0). Download speeds showed similar rankings, with Grameenphone at 23.3 Mbit/s and Teletalk at 11.8 Mbit/s.

== Usage ==
The number of Internet subscriptions in Bangladesh grew from 186,000 in 2000 to 617,300 in 2009. However, only 0.4% of the population used the Internet in 2009 giving Bangladesh one of the lowest usage percentages in the world, ahead of only North Korea, Myanmar, and Sierra Leone. This limited Internet penetration is due to many factors, including: unavailability in rural areas, high costs, little local content, limited or poor service quality, lack of infrastructure with the last mile often limited to dial-up, too many providers competing in a relatively small market, and low literacy rates. By 2011 however, the number of Internet users in Bangladesh had seen high growth of over 900% bringing the total number of users to 5,501,609 (3.5% of the total population) mainly due to wide availability of mobile Internet access.

In April 2010, Akhtaruzzaman Manju, president of Internet Service Providers' Association of Bangladesh, said "we've estimated that nearly 10 million people in the country are using 800,000 Internet connections on sharing basis", adding the number of Internet users in the country is increasing roughly 15-16 percent a year. "This increased Internet penetration will result in a 2.6 per cent contribution to the country's GDP by 2020, while creating 129 thousand more jobs by the same year" the research added.

The main obstacle to using the Internet in Bangladesh is its distribution. The Internet is still an urban privilege because telephone connections are more concentrated in urban areas, particularly in and around Dhaka. Mobile operators are providing substantial services in and outside urban areas using 3G/EDGE, there are also WiMax providers.

However, recently Bangladesh has seen growth in internet usage. Due to government various initiatives known as a2i project (open Hotspot zone, government offices with internet facility, Reduce bandwidth price etc.) have impacted the growth of users. As of April 2019, internet subscribers have reached 93.702 million users.

=== Recent Growth and Current Status (2020-2025) ===
Internet usage in Bangladesh has experienced exponential growth since 2020. By 2025, the total number of internet subscribers reached 77.7 million, representing a penetration rate of 44.5% of the population. Mobile internet dominates the market with 119.29 million subscribers, while fixed broadband connections reached 14.32 million.

The COVID-19 pandemic accelerated digital adoption, with internet users growing by 28% in 2020 alone. By 2025, mobile data consumption per user reached 8.2 GB per month, a significant increase from 1.2 GB in 2020.

The government's "Digital Bangladesh" initiative has been particularly successful in bridging the urban-rural divide. Internet access in rural areas increased from 28% in 2020 to 49% in 2025, though significant gaps remain compared to urban areas where penetration reached 78%.

The economic impact of internet usage has surpassed earlier predictions. The digital economy contributed 4.2% to Bangladesh's GDP in 2025, exceeding the 2020 projection of 2.6%. The sector created approximately 350,000 new jobs by 2025, primarily in e-commerce, digital services, and IT-enabled services.

Despite significant progress, challenges remain. Internet speed continues to lag behind regional peers, with average mobile download speeds of 39.85 Mbit/s compared to the global average of 45.6 Mbit/s (93rd in the world). The gender gap in internet access has narrowed but persists, with 48% female users compared to 52% male users in 2025.

==== Cybersecurity ====
With the rapid expansion of 4G and broadband services, the country's digital infrastructure has become a frequent target for automated cyber threats. Research conducted in early 2026 indicated a sharp increase in SSH brute-force attacks against local Linux servers, particularly affecting the financial and telecommunications sectors.

== Service quality ==
While the Internet speed in Bangladesh may not be among the fastest in the world, it has significantly improved in the recent past. As of July 2015, Bangladesh ranked 90th out of 198 countries on the Household Download Index by Net Index. Especially, the completion of the Kuakata submarine cable (Regional Submarine Telecommunications Project, Bangladesh) of BSCCL has added significant amount of transmission capacity (through SEA-ME-WE 5 Cable) and provided redundancy and low-latency with PoP to PoP connectivity.

Since starting of the Cox's Bazar submarine cable (through the SEA-ME-WE 4 cable) in 2006, the country has seen the Internet bandwidth price to drop significantly. In 2008, the Bangladesh Telecommunication Regulatory Commission (BTRC) slashed wholesale Internet bandwidth prices drastically, from BDT 80,000 (approximately US$1,125) per Mbit/s to BDT 18,000 (approximately US$250) per Mbit/s. In 2009, after complaints that retail prices were still too high for slow, unreliable connections, the BTRC indicated that they were going to begin monitoring ISPs to ensure that retail prices reflected the reduced wholesale prices. Inside the capital city, the retail price has been reduced and quality of Internet has become standardized significantly through the optical fiber internet providers. However, Internet connectivity with acceptable quality and reliability is still relatively costly for outside of Dhaka.

The government sees information and communication technologies (ICTs) as a key driver of socioeconomic development. This is reflected in the government's "Digital Bangladesh" plan as well as the National Information and Communication Technology Policy. Bangladesh is slowly moving up in the worldwide ICT rankings, rising from 130th in 2009 to 113th in 2012 in the "networked readiness index". But, while its ITC ranking has improved, Bangladesh still lags behind other low-income countries of its stature. Progress is limited due to deficiencies in the regulatory framework and infrastructure development. And ICT leaders are concerned that the annual budget does not support the government's ICT goals.

== Internet services ==
=== National Internet Exchanges (NIXs) and International Internet Gateways (IIGs) ===
All ISPs and equivalent service providers in Bangladesh exchange traffic via two systems, the National Internet Exchange (NIX) and International Internet Gateways (IIGs). The IIGs provide global Internet connectivity, while all domestic Internet traffic is routed via the NIX to minimize usage of international bandwidth. The NIX consists of two exchange points known as the Bangladesh Internet Exchange (BDIX) established in August 2004 and operated by the Sustainable Development Networking Programme and the Peering Society of Bangladesh and the Bangladesh Society of Internet Exchange (BSIX) established in May 2004. In June 2012 the BTRC announced plans to issue an unrestricted number of additional NIX licenses. There are two IIGs in service operated by, Mango Teleservices Limited and the government owned Bangladesh Telecommunications Company Limited (BTCL).

There are concerns that, with a limited number of NIX operators, only two IIG operators, and with BSCCL holding a monopoly as the only operator of the SEA-ME-WE fiber optic cables, limited competition will keep the cost of raw bandwidth high.

In 2012, Bangladesh Telecommunication Regulatory Authority has awarded additional 35 International Internet Gateways (IIGs). In 2014, one additional NIX license has been awarded to a NovoCom limited, a private limited company.

=== Internet service providers ===
In 2005 there were more than 180 ISPs operating in the country. ISPs are regulated by the BTRC. In 2016, there were 119 licensed ISPs providing services nationwide and 65 ISPs providing services in the central zone.

For more information about ISPs in Bangladesh, you can visit www.ispab.org

=== Mobile operators ===
Because fixed line penetration rates are and are expected to remain low, most Bangladeshis' first experience with the Internet is likely to be via mobile services. An estimated 90% of Bangladesh's Internet users got their access using mobile services in 2010. Out of the Four mobile operators, Teletalk, Grameenphone, Robi, & Banglalink offer 3G, 4G services in 64 districts of Bangladesh, others offer 3G, 4G Internet service on some specific areas and EDGE or GPRS GSM Internet service on rest of the areas. Operators are working on expanding their 3G, 4G services on all areas. The sole CDMA operator, Citycell, used to offer EVDO before it was shut down by the government in 2016. Airtel Bangladesh merged with Robi.

=== Broadband ===
Broadband Internet and e-commerce in Bangladesh is slowly progressing. In 2009 there were 50,000 fixed broadband Internet subscribers. However, In March 2016 there are currently 3.112 million ISP/PSTN users. According to BTRC data, there were 5.735 million broadband connections in November 2018. Though broadband Internet access is available, the charges for high speed connections are higher than in other south Asian countries, though this is changing. In Bangladesh Broadband is legally defined as 128/128 kbit/s, which is not in line with the ITU's definition and many broadband Internet services may not be considered true broadband internationally.

=== WiMAX ===
Three companies, BanglaLion Communications Ltd., Brac Bdmail Network Ltd., and Augere Wireless Broadband Bangladesh Ltd., won licenses to operate WiMAX in Bangladesh in September 2008. The three firms purchased the licenses at auction for 2.15 billion BDT (US$31 million) from the BTRC under an agreement that pays 27.50% of revenue to the government. Brac Bdmail declined to start the service. BanglaLion and Augere (branded as Qubee) launched commercial WiMax services by the end of 2009. WiMax usage tailed off after 3G mobile internet was introduced in 2013. Late in the decade, The Daily Star described WiMax as on the "brink of extinction" and "on its last legs".

=== Cyber cafés and Local Service Providers (LSPs) ===
Expensive and slow connections available from individual homes has created a demand for cyber cafés with higher than average bandwidth. The number of cyber cafés was estimated to be roughly 800 in 2009, unchanged from 2005. Cyber cafés were first regulated by the BTRC in 2009, but fewer than 150 had obtained the required license by the end of 2011.

=== Satellite internet ===
In 2025, Starlink started operation in Bangladesh, providing a new method of internet connectivity.

== Internet censorship and surveillance ==
The OpenNet Initiative found little or no evidence of filtering in 2011.

By 2020, a very large list of websites ranging from gaming websites to pornographic websites to gambling websites to social websites like Reddit, Medium, Mediafire and Change.org became blocked in Bangladesh. But eventually, some sites like Reddit got unblocked.

Although Internet access in Bangladesh is not restricted by a national level filtering regime, the state has intervened to block Web sites for hosting anti-Islamic content and content deemed subversive. Internet content is regulated by existing legal frameworks that restrict material deemed defamatory or offensive, as well as content that might challenge law and order.

The Bangla blogging platform Sachalayatan was reported to be inaccessible on 15 July 2008, and was forced to migrate to a new IP address. Although the blocking was not officially confirmed, Sachalayatan was likely Bangladesh's inaugural filtering event. YouTube was blocked for a few days in March 2009 in order to protect the "national interest". The disputed video covered a partial audio recording of a meeting between the prime minister and military officials, who were angry at the government's handling of a mutiny by border guards in Dhaka that left more than seventy people dead.

Facebook was blocked by the BTRC for 7 days starting on 29 May 2010 because of "obnoxious images", including depictions of Muhammad and several of the country's political officials as well as links to pornographic sites. The block was lifted after Facebook agreed to remove the offensive content. During the same period a 30-year-old man was arrested in the Bangladeshi capital on charges of uploading satiric images of some political leaders on Facebook.

The BTRC again blocked YouTube access in September 2012 after Google, Inc. ignored requests to remove the controversial film, Innocence of Muslims, from the site.

On 16 May 2013 BTRC asked the international internet gateway operators to reduce the upload bandwidth of ISPs by 75% in an effort to prevent illegal VoIP. There is speculation that the bandwidth reduction is actually an effort to make it difficult for people to upload 'problematic' videos, images, TV talk show clips, etc. in the social media.

In November and December 2015, the government blocked Facebook and other social media, for a period of twenty-two days. The purpose was to quell militant violence and opposition unrest as reactions to a death penalty to two opposition leaders, Salahuddin Quader Chowdhury and Ali Ahsan Mujahid, for war crimes committed in the 1971 independence war.

In 2019, and continuing into 2020, the government—citing "violence" and "security" issues, and the need to preserve "order"—has limited or blocked internet access to-and-from the Rohingya refugee camps around Cox's Bazar, particularly following organized protests and boycotts by Rohingya there, opposing the government's handling of their crisis. The communications blockade continued into 2020, despite objections from the Rohingya community and its global diaspora, and from human rights and aid organizations, and the United Nations, who have complained that the blackout—by limiting essential and urgent communications—increases the refugees' vulnerability to crime, and to the COVID-19 pandemic.

In 2024, during the July Revolution internet service was intermittently cut off and on including social media services. This caused hamper in international business, export oriented industries, freelance industry and communication. The internet crackdown ended on 5 August after the resignation of the prime minister.

== Internet top-level domain ==
The top-level domain for Bangladesh is '.bd' and '.bangla' .

== See also ==
- Media in Bangladesh
- Telecommunications in Bangladesh
- List of newspapers in Bangladesh, particularly:
  - Online newspapers and portals in Bangladesh
- satellite internet
- rural internet
