= Telephone numbers in Bangladesh =

- Country: Bangladesh
- Continent: Asia
- Regulator: Bangladesh Telecommunication Regulatory Commission
- Numbering plan type: Closed
- Numbering plan: National Numbering Plan - 2017
- Last updated: 31 July 2017
- Country code: +880
- International access: 001, 002
- Long-distance: 0

The country calling code of Bangladesh is +880.

The dial plan type in Bangladesh is closed, and "0" is the Trunk prefix.

When dialling a Bangladesh number from inside Bangladesh, the format is:
"0 – Area/operator code (X) – subscriber number (N)"

When dialling a Bangladesh number from abroad, the format is:
"+880 – Area/operator code (X) – subscriber number (N)"

The subscriber number is the number unique to each individual telephone/mobile following the area/operator code. The Area/operator codes in Bangladesh are listed below, with a typical number format, where "X" denotes the Area/Operator code and "N" denotes the individual subscriber's telephone/mobile number.

== Mobile network operators ==
Typical format for a mobile phone number when dialed from locally 01XNN-NNNNNN and for international call is +880 1XNN-NNNNNN (where X is operator code and N is subscriber number). Operator code for mobile network operators are:

Prefix	Operator
+88 010	Spare
+88 011	Citycell (closed in 2016)
+88 012	Spare
+88 013	Grameenphone (Skito)
+88 014	Banglalink
+88 015	Teletalk
+88 016	Airtel (Cirkle)
+88 017	Grameenphone
+88 018	Robi Axiata
+88 019	Banglalink

After 2018, when MNP was introduced in Bangladesh customers can switch their operator with their existing phone number including their operator code.

== Fixed line network operators ==
=== Private/Public switched telephone network (PSTN) ===
Typical format for a private fixed line telephone number is +880 XXNN-NNNNNN.

035 – Bangla Phone 
036 – Telebarta 
037 – National Phone 
038 – PeoplesTel 
044 – RanksTel 
060 – Bijoy Phone 
064 – Onetel 
066 – Dhaka Phone 
042 - Sheba Phone

=== BTCL old geographical area codes ===
- Typical format for a BTCL line number in Dhaka +880-2-N-NNNN-NNNN.
- Typical format for a BTCL line number elsewhere +880-XXX-NNN-NNNN.

Area Code	District / Area
02	Dhaka, Gopalganj District, Narayongonj District, Narsingdi District, IMS Number (Malopara, Shalbagan, Tanore, Godagari, Noahata- Rajshahi & Jessore)
031	Chittagong District
0321	Noakhali District
0331	Feni District
0341	Cox's Bazar District
0351	Rangamati District
0361	Bandarban District
0371	Khagrachari District
0381	Lakshmipur District
041	Khulna District
0421	Jessore District
0431	Barisal District
0441	Patuakhali District
0451	Jhenaidah District
0461	Pirojpur District
0468	Bagerhat District
0471	Satkhira District
0481	Narail District
0491	Bhola District
0498	Jhalakati District
051	Bogra District
0521	Rangpur District
0531	Dinajpur District
0541	Gaibandha District
0551	Nilphamari District
0561	Thakurgaon District
0568	Panchagarh District
0571	Joypurhat District
0581	Kurigram District
0591	Lalmonirhat District
0611	Magura District
0621	Narsingdi District
0631	Faridpur District
0641	Rajbari District
0651	Manikganj District
0661	Madaripur District
0662	Shariatpur District
0671	Narayanganj District
0681	Gazipur District
0682	Kaliakair Upazila
0691	Munshiganj District
071	Kushtia District
0721	Rajshahi District
0731	Pabna District
0741	Naogaon District
0751	Sirajganj District
0761	Chuadanga District
0771	Natore District
0781	Chapai Nawabganj District
0791	Meherpur District
081	Comilla District
0821	Sylhet District
0831	Habiganj District
0841	Chandpur District
0851	Brahmanbaria District
0861	Moulvibazar District
0871	Sunamganj District
091	Mymensingh District
0921	Tangail District
0922	Mirzapur Upazila
0931	Sherpur District
0941	Kishoreganj District
0951	Netrokona District
0981	Jamalpur District

=== BTCL new telephone number ===
- Typical format for a new BTCL telephone number is +8802XNN-NNNNNN (where X is zone code and N is subscriber number).

Zone Code	Zone Name	Areas Covered
022	Central zone	Dhaka City, Narayanganj City, Gazipur City, Narshingdi City, Tongi, Tungipara
023	South-East zone	Chittagong District, Chandpur District, Feni District, Comilla District and nearby districts
024	South-West zone	Khulna District, Barishal District and nearby districts
025	North-West zone	Rajshahi District, Rangpur District and nearby districts
029	North-East zone	Sylhet District, Mymensingh District, Manikganj District, Sherpur District, Jamalpur District and nearby districts

== IP telephony service providers (IPTSP) ==
- Typical format for an IP telephone number is +880-96XX-NNNNNN (where XX is provider code and N is subscriber number). Licensed providers include:

Prefix	ISP / Provider
9601	UberNet
9602	BTEL
9603	Royal Green Online
9604	Fusion Net
9606	Agni Systems
9609	BEXIMCO Online
9610	ADN Telecom
9611	AmberIT (Dhakacom Ltd.)
9612	MetroNet
9613	Getco Online
9614	NextFone
9617	Ranks IIT
9619	Chittagong Online
9633	IDEA Networks & Communications
9636	Nreach-Net+880 ********73
9638	Brilliant Connect (Intercloud Ltd.)
9639	ICC Communication
9640	Red Data
9642	SSD Tech
9643	Race Online
9644	Icon Infotec
9645	Digicon Telecommunication
9646	Cosmopolitan Communications (CCL)
9647	Weblink Communications
9648	Premium Connectivity
9649	Sarkar Communication
9654	Tele Bangla+880 ********73
9666	Kotha (BDCOM online)
9669	ConnectBD
9677	BRACNet
9678	Dial (Link3)
9699	Alo Talk (Alo Communications Limited)
9696	Alaap (BTCL)
9697	Alaap (BTCL)

== Special Numbers ==
Number	Service Description	Notes / Reference
333	Central Helpline of Bangladesh	
999	Emergency services	
106	Anti Corruption Commission	
102	Bangladesh Fire Service & Civil Defence	
131	Bangladesh Railway	
121	Customer care for mobile network operators	
105	NID Services	
158	Customer complaints for all mobile network operators	
5012	News	
152	International Trunk call booking	
14	Time	BTCL
109	Violence Against Women and Children prevention Helpline	

== See also ==
- Mobile telephone numbering in India
- North American Numbering Plan
