= SAtel =

SATel
- Company type: Private
- Industry: Telecommunications
- Founded: Late 1990s
- Defunct: 2020s (approximate)
- Fate: Inactive
- Headquarters: Bangladesh
- Area served: South-eastern Bangladesh
- Services: Fixed-line telephone

SATel or S.A. Telecom System Limited was a private fixed-line telephone service provider in Bangladesh. It operated in the south-eastern region of the country. As of November 2009, the company had about 17,577 subscribers.

== History ==
To increase competition in the telecommunications sector, the government of Bangladesh began issuing PSTN licenses to private operators in the late 1990s. As a result, various regional Public Switched Telephone Network (PSTN) operators emerged. As part of this process, SATel was established and began providing fixed-line telephone services in the south-eastern region.

=== Operations ===
- SATel mainly provided fixed-line telephone services.
- Its operations were limited to the south-eastern region, making it smaller compared to national operators.
- As of November 2009, the company had a total of 17.577 thousand subscribers.

=== Competition ===
At the same time, multiple regional and national companies operated in Bangladesh's PSTN market. Notable among them were:

- Banglafone Limited
- RanksTel
- WorldTel Bangladesh
- Onetel Communication Ltd.
- International Telephone Service Limited (ISL)

As of February 2009, the total number of public switched telephone network (PSTN) subscribers in the country was about 1.372 million. SATel held a relatively small share in this market.

== Present status ==
Due to the rise of mobile phone usage and technological changes, the use of public switched telephone network (PSTN) services in Bangladesh declined rapidly. By the 2020s, most private PSTN operators had shut down or become inactive. Currently, the market is mainly served by BTCL (BTCL), which provides PSTN services. Reliable information about SATel's recent operations is scarce.

== See also ==
- Telecommunications in Bangladesh
