= University of Trans-Disciplinary Health Sciences and Technology =

Private university in Bangalore, Karnataka, India

- Established: 2013
- Founders: Sam Pitroda; Anant Darshan Shankar
- Affiliations: UGC
- Vice-Chancellor: Anant Darshan Shankar
- Location: Bengaluru, Karnataka, India
- Website: tdu.edu.in

University of Trans-Disciplinary Health Sciences and Technology (TDU), formerly Institute of Trans-Disciplinary Health Sciences and Technology, is a private university located in Bangalore, Karnataka, India. The university was established in 2013 by the Foundation for Revitalization of Local Health Tradition (FRLHT) through The Institute of Trans-disciplinary Health Sciences and Technology Act, 2013. The founders of FRLHT and TDU are Sam Pitroda and Anant Darshan Shankar, the latter serving as the vice chancellor of TDU.

== Academics ==
TDU offers undergraduate and postgraduate programmes through its two schools, the School of Liberal Arts and Sciences (SLAS), which offers programmes in Life Sciences, and the School of Integrative Health Sciences (SIHS) which offers courses in Health Sciences.

In September 2024, it released a comprehensive five-volume dictionary of Ayurveda (Sanskrit-English-Kannada), which includes 5,000 technical Ayurvedic terms and ancient works on ‘Jvara’ (fever).
