= OneTel =

OneTel may refer to:

- One.Tel, an Australian-based telecommunications company
- Onetel Communication Ltd., a public switched telephone network operator in Bangladesh

== See also ==
- One Telecommunications, later One Albania
