= TDU =

TDU may stand for:

- Territorial Defense of Ukraine
- Test Drive Unlimited, a 2006 video game
- Tour Down Under, a cycling competition in Australia
- Teamsters for a Democratic Union, a movement to reform the Teamsters labor union
- Trash disposal unit, a life support system on submarines
- Institute of Trans-Disciplinary Health Sciences and Technology, a private university in India
- Tokyo Denki University, a private university in Japan
