= Pornography in Bangladesh =

In Bangladesh, pornography in any form is illegal. It is against the law to watch, produce, distribute, or possess pornography since the enactment of the Pornography Control Act in 2012.

== History ==
=== Pre-independence and early post-independence eras ===
In the Bengal region under British colonial rule, pornographic content was primarily confined to print media, such as erotic literature and nascent sexual periodicals. These periodicals, which featured nude photographic inserts, were constrained by the printing technology and colonial censorship of the 1940s through the 1970s. This material often consisted of smuggled foreign publications. They were scarce in Muslim-majority East Bengal due to Islamic cultural prohibitions and limited distribution systems. Consequently, access was restricted to elite or clandestine circles.

Following Bangladesh's independence in 1971, visual pornography began to emerge through cut-pieces. These were short celluloid clips of explicit sexual acts, illegally inserted during the screening of mainstream action films in the 1970s and 1980s, particularly in semi-rural cinema halls. Typically 1–2 minutes in length and featuring regional performers, these unauthorised stag-film segments evaded the Bangladesh Film Censor Board. They were added to the films after certification and removed before any formal inspections.

In the mid-1980s, the arrival of VHS cassettes accelerated the availability of moving-image pornography through blue films smuggled from India and abroad. These spread widely in clandestine rental markets and began to compete with local cinema.

From the late 1980s through the 1990s, VHS tapes enabled small-scale domestic dubbing of foreign content onto affordable cassettes. While this fostered a shift from communal cut-piece viewing in cinemas to private or group video viewing in urban Dhaka and rural areas, supply remained limited due to import risks and primitive duplication equipment. The media of this era were ephemeral, and tapes were often erased or hidden for fear of capture.

=== Transition to the digital age ===
Beginning in the late 1990s, the expansion of internet in Bangladesh facilitated the distribution of pornography. Internet subscribers grew from 186,000 in 2000 to 617,300 by 2009, a surge driven primarily by the proliferation of cyber cafés in urban areas like Dhaka. In these cyber cafés, users could gain affordable access to global pornographic websites.

In the mid-2000s, digital storage media such as CDs and USB drives replaced celluloid reels, allowing for the easy portability and duplication of pornographic material. The introduction of cheap mobile data plans in the late 2000s and early 2010s further accelerated this evolution. Smartphone use enabled peer-to-peer sharing and rudimentary streaming of both imported and amateur domestic content, especially around 2010 as online uploads of locally produced clips began to increase.

As early as March 2009, ad hoc measures were taken to block specific pornography-hosting sites. While these initial blocks targeted public foreign platforms, they proved ineffective due to VPNs and local networks.

== Types of publications ==
=== Print ===
Pornographic materials may include perverted and paraphilic novels, sometimes with illustrations, which are often sold by small roadside book shops.

=== Internet ===
In 2009, studies by the Manusher Jonno Foundation found increase in production of child pornography. In 2013, a report by the Bangladesh Sangbad Sangstha cited a study that found that over 30 million taka worth of pornography is downloaded per month in cyber cafes in Dhaka, Bangladesh. The report also found that 77 percent of pornography viewers were underage.

In 2015, the High Court Division asked the government to stop pornographic material in social media. In 2016, Bangladesh government minister Tarana Halim, had announced plans to block internet porn sites in Bangladesh. The information and telecommunications minister of the 11th parliamentary government of Bangladesh Mostafa Zabbar blocked nearly 20,000 porn websites access in Bangladesh from November 2018 to February 2019.

In 2025, a couple were arrested for producing, distributing and recruiting for intention of producing pornography under Pornography Control Act 2012.

== Legality ==
The Pornography Control Act of 2012 defined pornography as images and videos depicting nudity or semi-nudity. The Act criminalizes pornography, making the possession, distribution and production of pornographic material illegal in the country.

The maximum punishment for producing pornography is up to 7 years of imprisonment with hard labour with fines up to 200,000 BDT. The minimum punishment for possessing and distributing pornographic material can be up to 5 years of imprisonment with labour and fines up to 200,000 BDT.

Possession, distribution, production and publication of child pornography can result in up to 10 years in prison with labour and fines up to 500,000 BDT.

== Socio-cultural attitudes ==
The law has been welcomed by most Bangladeshis. However, critics argue that while the law may deter blackmailing and exploitation, it will be difficult to enforce. In 2012, the Press Secretary to the Prime Minister of Bangladesh, Abul Kalam Azad, stated that "pornography has spread like a disease in Bangladesh". Pornography is viewed negatively and is blamed for turning children into "perverts".

== See also ==
- Internet censorship in Bangladesh
- Male prostitution in Bangladesh
- Prostitution in Bangladesh
- Pornography in Asia
