= Kallol Group of Companies =

Bangladeshi diversified conglomerate

- Founded: 1972
- Founder: Ghulam Mostafa
- Headquarters: Dhaka, Bangladesh
- Region served: Bangladesh
- Official language: Bengali
- Website: kallolgroup.com

Kallol Group of Companies (Bengali: কল্লোল গ্রুপ অফ কোম্পানিজ) is a Bangladeshi diversified conglomerate based in Dhaka. Ghulam Mostafa is the managing director of Kallol Group. Kallol Group is a major importer of wristwatches in Bangladesh through its subsidiary Time Zone. It was the first importer of tissue in Bangladesh.

== History ==
Kallol Group of Companies was established in 1972.

Kallol Group of Companies signed a licensee agreement with the United Kingdom-based Fay International Limited to produce Fay branded tissues in Bangladesh. Kallol Group started importing Fay tissue and distributing them in Bangladesh in 1987, the first to sell tissue in the country.

Kallol Group became the distributor of Nutri-C in Bangladesh in 1999.

On 23 February 2004, Kallol Group became a corporate client of Grameenphone.

In 2006, Kallol Group bought local detergent brand Jet and Kohinoor Detergent factory. The group signed an agreement with Nestle Malaysia through Kallol Distributions Limited to distribute its products in Bangladesh. In 2007, the Group became a franchisee of World of Titan. The Time Zone stores have 52 locations in Bangladesh.

On 17 May 2010, Kallol Group signed an agreement with Jyothy Laboratories of India to create Jyothy Kallol Bangladesh Limited to produce Ujala fabric whitener. The joint venture is owned 75 percent by Jyothy Laboratories of India and the remaining 25 percent are held by Kallol Group. On 18 August 2006, Kallol Group signed an agreement with Thai President Foods to create a joint venture company called Kallol Thai President Foods to produce MAMA noodles.

In August 2011, the office of Kallol Group in Tejgaon was robbed of 1.9 million taka in cash and 2.6 million taka worth of watches.

== Businesses ==
- Fay Tissue
- Kallol Chemicals Limited (Jet detergent)
- Kallol Thai President Foods (MAMA noodles)
- Jyothy Kallol Bangladesh Ltd
- Nutri-C
- Time Zone- major importer of watches, including Swiss watches, in Bangladesh.
- Kallol Distributions Limited
