= .bd =

Top-level Internet domain for Bangladesh

- Introduced: 20 May 1999
- TLD type: Country code top-level domain
- Status: Active
- Registry: Bangladesh Telecommunications Company Limited
- Sponsor: Ministry of Posts, Telecommunications and Information Technology
- Intended use: Entities connected with Bangladesh
- Actual use: Used in Bangladesh
- Registered domains: 31,042 (5 October 2022)
- Registration restrictions: Earlier only some subdomains (eg: ".gov.bd", ".com.bd") were allowed for registration but now all types of domains are allowed for registration like example.bd
- Structure: [name].[generic domain].bd and [name].bd
- Documents: Agreement
- Dispute policies: Existence of a dispute is mentioned in agreement, but no details can be found
- DNSSEC: No
- Registry website: bdia.btcl.com.bd domainreg.btcl.com.bd

.বাংলা
- Introduced: 2011
- TLD type: Country code top-level domain
- Status: Active
- Registry: Bangladesh Telecommunications Company Limited
- Sponsor: Ministry of Posts, Telecommunications and Information Technology
- Intended use: Entities connected with Bangladesh
- Registered domains: 610 (5 October 2021)
- Structure: [name].বাংলা
- DNS name: xn--54b7fta0cc
- Registry website: bdia.btcl.com.bd

.bd is the Internet country code top-level domain (ccTLD) for Bangladesh. It is administered by the Ministry of Posts, Telecommunications and Information Technology.

== Registrations ==
Registrations are at the third level beneath several second-level labels, paralleling the oldest gTLDs; registration is open except in the gov and mil subdomains, which are limited to authorized entities in the Bangladesh government.

Though online registration is available, currently BTCL only allows Second-level domain registration of .bd domain for only Bangladeshi citizens.

It only allows the structure of websites like - example.com.bd, example2.com.bd. example3.com.bd; but not like - example.bd, example2.bd, example3.bd.

== Top-level domains ==
=== .bd ===
Though the .bd domain was introduced on 20 May 1999, the Bangladesh Telecommunications Company Limited (BTCL) started registering for generals in 2003.

=== .বাংলা ===
The .বাংলা ("Bangla") domain was introduced in 2011. The BTCL started the process of assigning domain names for websites on 1 January 2017.

== Second-level domains ==
Domain Extension	Areas	Registration qualifications.
.com.bd	Commercial	Commercial entities and purposes
.co.bd	Commercial	Commercial and general purposes
.org.bd	Organization	Not-for-profit entities
.info.bd	Information	Individual uses
.net.bd	Network	Restricted to Bangladeshi internet service provider's infrastructure
.edu.bd	Educational institution	Restricted to Bangladeshi educational institute, college and universities
.ac.bd	Educational institution	Restricted to Bangladeshi academic institutes, schools and coaching centers
.sch.bd	Educational institution	Specialized second-level domain in Bangladesh reserved exclusively for primary, secondary, and higher secondary schools.
.mil.bd	Military	Military and military organizations only.
.gov.bd	Government	Restricted to government.
.tv.bd	Broadcasting	Organizations or individuals
.id.bd	General/Open	Personal or Individual
.bd	General/Open	It is open to all individuals and organizations for registration and use.
.ai.bd	AI Institutions	Any Bangladeshi company or organization working with Artificial Intelligence can register and use this domain.
.dev.bd	General/Open	It is open to all individuals and organizations for registration and use.

== Reception ==
Due to service issues and not being a gTLD .bd and .বাংলা domains have less than 45,000 registered domains.

== See also ==
- Internet in Bangladesh
- Telecommunications in Bangladesh
