= Ekhanei.com =

- Screenshot of the main page on 23 December 2016
- Company type: Private company
- Website type: Classifieds
- Available in: Bengali, English
- Founded: 2006 (renamed 2014)
- Headquarters: Dhaka, Bangladesh
- Area served: Bangladesh
- Owners: Schibsted, Telenor and Naspers
- Key people: Shylendra A S Nathan (CEO)
- Website: ekhanei.com
- Advertising: None
- Registration: Optional
- Current status: Closed

Ekhanei (Bengali: এখানেই, lit. 'right here') or ekhanei.com was a mobile-based online marketplace classified advertisements website of buying and selling property, gadgets, vehicles and personal items for sale. Tickets and jobs are also posted among other things. Starting in 2006 as CellBazaar, it was the first online free classified ads website in Bangladesh. By Alexa Internet ranking, as of August 2015, it was the top shopping site and the fifth business and economy website in Bangladesh. In 2017 the parent company announced to shut down it.

== History ==
Ekhanei.com was launched, as Cellbazaar, in 2006. It was owned by Grameenphone, the largest mobile phone operator in Bangladesh. In 2010, after reaching four million users, it was acquired by Telenor, a major global telecom company with particular strength in Asian markets, with operations in, according to the company website, 13 countries. CellBazaar the company won a Tech Award in 2007 in the category of economic development, and GSM Global Mobile Awards (Barcelona, 2008) in the category of "Best Use of Mobile for Social & Economic Development".

The company became Ekhanei in June 2014 when it was overtaken by SnT Classified. SnT Classifieds is an equal shareholding joint venture between Schibsted, a major global classifieds company, with operations in, according to the company website, 30 countries, and Telenor. Telenor bought 33.3% shares of the online marketplace company, while contributing its Bangladeshi asset Cellbazaar. Schibsted contributed its South American assets.

South African Naspers, Norway's Schibsted ASA and Telenor ASA, and Singapore Press Holdings joined in a co-operation agreement in November 2014, which included the transfer of assets and merger of operation in many markets including Bangladesh, where Nasper's Bangladesh operation OLX was launched in January 2015. In January 2011, Schibsted, Naspers and Telenor merged their operations into one platform – Ekhanei.com. As of 2015, it is 50.3 percent owned by SnT Classified, the parent company of ekhanei.com, and 49.7 percent owned by Naspers.

On May 17, 2017, Telenor, the parent company of market leader mobile operator Grameenphone, had shut down the service. The group, one of the world's major mobile operators, took the decision due to inability to develop the company into a sustainable and profitable business.

Based on online classifieds market condition and not being able to develop the company into a sustainable and profitable business, the owners have decided to close the operations of the company, effective of May 17, 2017

Telenor and its partners' main job is to take care of the affected employees, who will be offered "severance packages" according to company policies. Though Telenor has decided to close one of its venture's operations, its sister concern Grameenphone is doing well with GP shop, where they only sell gadgets.

== Market ==
Internet users in Bangladesh had Tk 147 billion worth of 105 million used goods in their stocks in according to MetrixLab, a market research firm, According to Bangladesh Bank, around 1 million versatile clients access the mobile banking benefits. Over 1 billion transactions are made through mobile banking accounts.

== See also ==
- OLX
- Bikroy.com
