= Link3 =

Internet provider in Bangladesh

Link3 Technologies Ltd
- Type: Private
- Industry: Technology
- Founded: 2000; 26 years ago
- Founder: Sheikh Raihan Ahmed & Sajjid Haider Pasha
- Headquarters: Police Plaza Concord, Tower-1, 13th floor, 144 Gulshan Avenue, Gulshan, Dhaka, Bangladesh
- Areas served: 64 Districts in Bangladesh
- Key people: Sheikh Raihan Ahmed (Chairman & MD); Sajjid Haider Pasha(Founder & Director)
- Services: Fiber to the x; Internet service provider; Digital television; Leased line
- Number of employees: 1200+ (2022)
- Website: www.link3.net

Link3 Technologies Ltd also known as Link3, is an IT and internet company based in Dhaka, Bangladesh.

== History ==
Link3 Technologies Ltd was founded in 2000 by Sheikh Raihan Ahmed & Sajjid Haider Pasha in Dhaka. Link3 is an official licensee of the Bangladesh Telecom Regulatory Commission (BTRC) to provide nationwide Data Connectivity & Internet Service & Domestic Data Communication Service. It has obtained an ISP license [license No.-BTRC/LL/ISP-Nationwide (10) Link3/2008-79] from BTRC.

Moreover, Link3 Technologies Limited acquired BTRC approved Internet Protocol Telephony Service Provider (IPTSP) license in September 2009. Since then Link3 Technologies Limited has been providing IP Telephony service to its valued customer. Link3 has state of the art voice over IP infrastructure for domestic and international telecommunication. Link3 has redundant connectivity with ICX (Inter Communication Exchange) for domestic Mobile/PSTN calls and with IGW (International Gateway) for ISD calls.

With the approval of BTRC for providing Domestic Data Communication, IPTS Link3 has built its nationwide network with the foot print of 64 Districts. Link3 Technologies Ltd. Has installed 262 individual PoP (Point of Presence) to build its nationwide network.

== Expansion plan ==
Link3 have applied to the Bangladesh Government to launch native communication apps like WhatsApp and Viber.

== See also ==
- Bangladesh Telecommunication Regulatory Commission
- Bangladesh Telecommunications Company Limited
