= .bangla =

Internationalized country code top-level domain of Bangladesh

.বাংলা
- Introduced: 2011
- TLD type: Country code top-level domain
- Status: Active
- Registry: Bangladesh Telecommunications Company Limited
- Sponsor: Ministry of Post & Telecommunications
- Intended use: Entities connected with Bangladesh for content in the Bengali language
- Structure: [name].বাংলা
- Documents: Agreement
- Dispute policies: Existence of a dispute policy is mentioned in agreement, but no details can be found
- DNS name: xn--54b7fta0cc
- Registry website: bdia.btcl.com.bd বিটিসিএল.বাংলা

.বাংলা (romanized as .bangla) is a secondary and internationalized country code top-level domain (ccTLD) on the Internet for Bangladesh. This domain is meant for web addresses in the Bengali language. It is administered by the Ministry of Posts, Telecommunications and Information Technology.

.bd (in the Latin script) is the primary Internet country code top-level domain (ccTLD) for Bangladesh.

.বাংলা was introduced in 2011 but delegated to the Bangladesh Telecommunications Company in 2016, meaning that the process of defining sub domains could start.

.বাংলা is available for registration for all since 16 December 2016.
