= Anant Darshan Shankar =

Indian health activist

- Born: Mumbai, Maharashtra, India
- Occupations: Vice Chancellor, TDU
- Awards: Padma Shri; Columbia University Award
- Website: Official web site

Anant Darshan Shankar, known as Darshan Shankar, is the founder and current Vice-Chancellor of The University of Trans-Disciplinary Health Sciences and Technology, Bengaluru. He was born in Bombay in the state of Maharashtra.

His core areas of interest are educational innovation and the sociology, history and epistemology of India’s Medical Heritage. He is the founder of the Foundation for Revitalization of Local Health Traditions, which is a Government of India accredited scientific and research organization mandated to revitalize the medical heritage of India.

== Early career ==
Darshan Shankar started his career in 1973 at the age of 23, at the University of Bombay, where he designed and implemented a post graduate “experiential” learning program that won a Commonwealth Award in 1976, for being the best program in the Commonwealth for linking University education to community needs.

He worked as one of the youngest faculty at the University of Bombay from 1973 to 1980. In 1980 he started an NGO in Maharashtra and lived and worked for twelve years in a forested tribal taluka at the foot hills of the Western Ghats. The NGO engaged in programs related to S&T applications for tribal habitats.

During 1985 – 1990, he seeded and directed a pioneering all India Network of NGOs called Lok Swasthya Parampara Samvardhan Samiti (LSPSS). During 1986 – 1990 served as honorary consultant to office of the Advisor to the PM on Technology Missions.

In 1993, he moved to Bangalore, where along with Sam Pitroda, he founded the Foundation for Revitalization of Local Health Traditions (FRLHT) and the 100-bed healthcare centre called Institute of Ayurveda and Integrative Medicine (IAIM). In 2013 the Government of Karnataka upgraded FRLHT into “The University of Trans-Disciplinary Health Sciences & Technology (TDU)”, Bengaluru.

== Awards ==
Darshan Shankar is the first Indian to receive the Columbia University Award from Rosenthal Centre of Columbia University and College of Physicians and Surgeons, New York, in 2003. The Government of India honored him with the country's fourth-highest civilian award, the Padma Shri. in 2011. He has also won the Norman Borlaug award in 1998 for his contributions to conservation of wild populations of medicinal plants.

== See also ==
- Foundation for Revitalization of Local Health Traditions
