= Foundation for Revitalisation of Local Health Traditions =

Foundation for Revitalisation of Local Health Traditions (FRLHT) is a registered Public Trust and Charitable Society, which started its activities in 1993 under the guidance of Sam Pitroda and Anant Darshan Shankar. The Indian Ministry of Science & Technology recognizes FRLHT as a scientific and research organization. The Ministry of Environment and Forests has designated FRLHT as a National Center of Excellence for medicinal plants and traditional knowledge.

The foundation plans to "revitalize Indian medical heritage” through creative applications of traditional health sciences for enhancing the quality of health care in rural and urban India and globally. The stated mission of the foundation is to demonstrate the contemporary relevance of Indian Medical Heritage by designing and implementing innovative programs on a size and scale that will have societal impact.

== Core Objectives ==
The aim of the foundation is to make full use of India's rich and diverse medical knowledge.

== Awards and recognitions ==
The organization received the Norman Borlaug Award in 1998, Equator Initiative Prize of the United Nations in 2002 and the Columbia University Award from Rosenthal Centre of Columbia University and College of Physicians and Surgeons, New York, in 2003. Anant Darshan Shankar, the Director of the institution was honored by the Government of India in 2011 with the award of Padma Shri.
