= Bijoy Phone =

Bijoy Phone is a Bangladeshi fixed line operator. It is a private public switched telephone network (PSTN) operator in Bangladesh. As of May 2008, total number of subscriber of this operator is 3.948 thousand.

== History ==
Bijoy Phone has obtained license from Bangladesh Telecommunication Regulatory Commission (BTRC) to provide fixed phone services in the Northeast part of Bangladesh.

== Numbering scheme ==
Bijoy Phone uses the following numbering scheme for its subscribers:

+880 605 N_{1}N_{2}N_{3}N_{4}N_{5}N_{6}N_{7}N_{8}

where 880 is the International Subscriber Dialling Code for Bangladesh and is needed only in case of dialling from outside.

605 is the access code for Bijoy Phone as allocated by the Government of Bangladesh. Omitting +880 will require to use 0 in place of it instead to represent local call, hence 0605 is the general access code.
