= Grameen Telecom =

Bangladeshi telecommunications company

Grameen Telecom (GTC) was established in Bangladesh by Muhammad Yunus with a partial stake in Grameenphone (GP) and registered as a Not-for-Profit Company, Limited by Guarantee, under Section 28 of the Companies Act, 1994. GTC launched the program of Village Phone that enables rural poor to own a mobile phone and turn it into a profit-making venture. The vision behind the village phone program was formulated by Iqbal Quadir, who was convinced that a mobile phone could become a source of income. Quadir worked with Yunus and the Norwegian company Telenor to make the program a reality.

== Programs ==
Grameen Telecom programs offer rural people access to information technology. The Village Phone (Polli Phone; spelling পল্লী ফোন; pronunciation pôl'li fôn) program is the largest such program.

=== Village Phone ===
Village Phone provides telecommunication services to underprivileged people in Bangladesh. To become a subscriber, one must first become a member of Grameen Bank.

These phones have low billing rates and are given on easy credit from Grameen Bank. Subscribers are encouraged to provide services to neighbors, covering both outgoing and incoming calls for a fee. The fee can be used to repay the debt and earn a profit. Many inhabitants of rural Bangladesh, particularly underprivileged women, have been able to change their lives with the help of Village Phone.

=== Information kiosks ===
Grameen Telecom provides information kiosks. These kiosks are set up to provide village people with access to information and communication technology. Initially, three pilot kiosks were set up in Tangail district.

== Awards ==
- CAPAM Bronze Award for Service to the Public 1998.
- GSM Association Award for "GSM Community Service" in 1998.
- Petersburg Prize for "Use of IT to improve Poor People's Lives" in 2004.
- First ITU World Information Society Award in 2005.

== Sources ==
- Village Phone page on Grameen Phone website
- Talk by Iqbal Quadir, TED Global talking about the Grameen Telecom program
