= Banglalink =

Telecommunication company operating in Bangladesh

Banglalink Digital Communications Ltd.

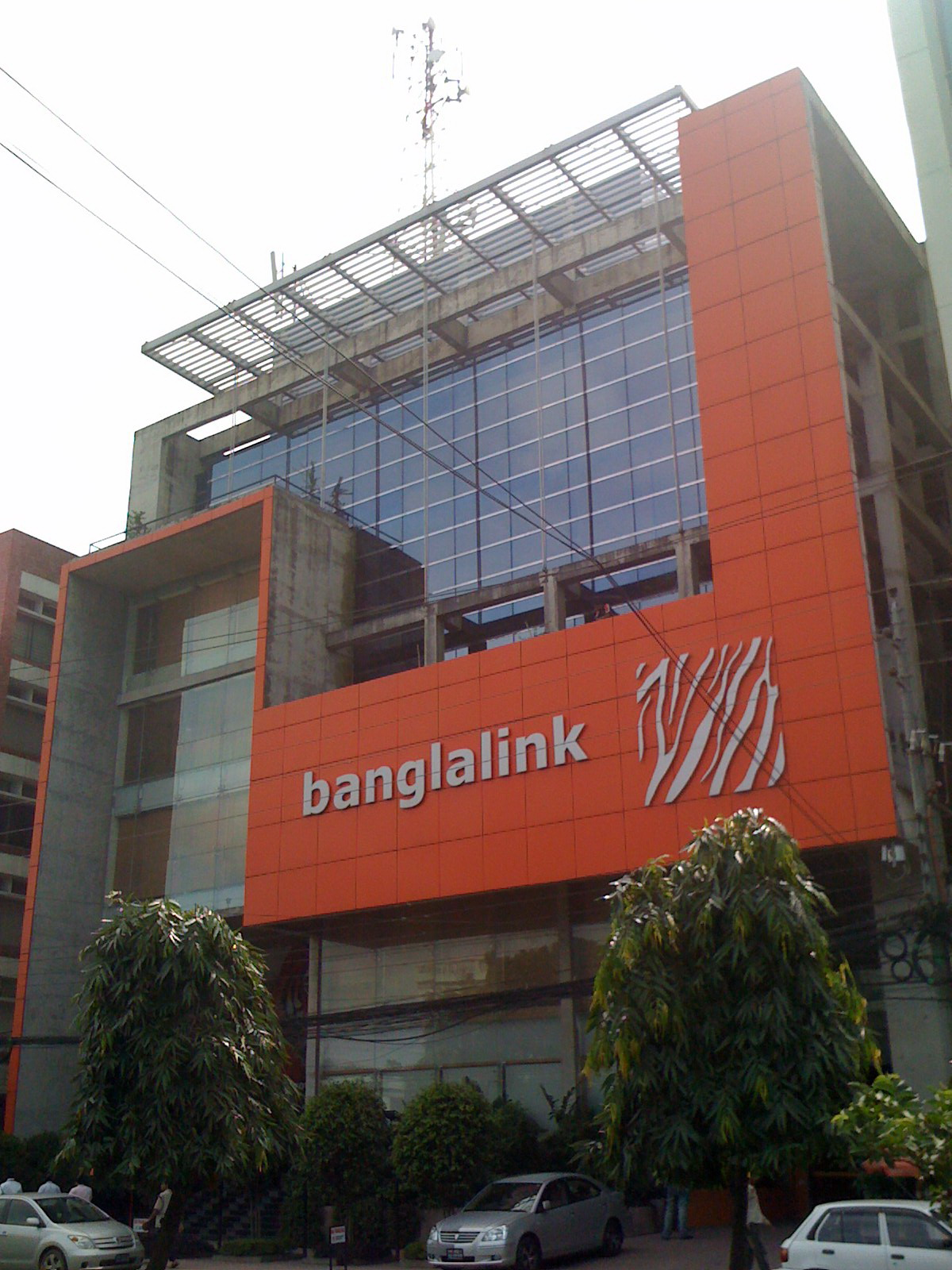
- Banglalink's headquarters in Gulshan 1
- Formerly: Sheba Telecom Private Limited
- Type: Subsidiary
- Industry: Telecommunications
- Founded: February 2005; 21 years ago
- Headquarters: Dhaka, Bangladesh
- Area served: Bangladesh
- Key people: Johan Buse (CEO)
- Products: Mobile Telephony; LTE 5G
- Services: Telecommunications
- Revenue: ▲BDT৳61.489 billion (FY 2023)
- Net income: ▲BDT৳11.567 billion (2023)
- Owner: VEON Ltd. (100%)
- Website: www.banglalink.net

Banglalink Digital Communications Ltd., d.b.a. Banglalink (Bengali: বাংলালিংক); formerly Sheba Telecom Pvt. Ltd. is a Veon Group owned telecommunications company headquartered in Gulshan-1, Dhaka. It is the third-largest mobile network operator in Bangladesh and a fully owned subsidiary of Veon Group. As of February 2024, Banglalink had approximately 43.9 million subscribers. According to Ookla, it was also recognised as the fastest mobile network in Bangladesh for the fourth consecutive year. The majority of Veon shares are owned by Luxembourg-based LetterOne Holdings S.A., which was founded by Russian-Israeli tycoon and oligarch Mikhail Friedman.

Banglalink attained 1 million subscribers by December 2005, and 3 million subscribers by October 2006. In less than two years, by December 2007, Banglalink overtook Airtel (now Robi) to become the second-largest operator in Bangladesh behind Grameenphone with more than 7.1 million customers.

Banglalink had 1.03 million connections until December 2005. The number of Banglalink users increased by 257% and stood at 3.64 million at the end of 2006, making it the fastest-growing operator in the world of that year. In August 2006, Banglalink became the first company to provide free incoming calls from BTTB for both postpaid and prepaid connections. On 20 August 2008, Banglalink got past the landmark of a 10 million subscriber base. As of 2023, Banglalink had a subscriber base of ~43.48 million.

== History ==
Sheba Telecom (Pvt.) Ltd. was granted license in 1989, to operate in the rural areas of 199 upazilas. The company started providing GSM service in 1998.

In July 2004, an Egypt-based company, Orascom Telecom (currently Global Telecom Holding), purchased Sheba Telecom and formed Banglalink brand, as Sheba Telecom failed to tap the business potentials in Bangladesh mainly due to a chronic feud between its Malaysian and Bangladeshi partners. The purchasing value was US$60 million, of which US$50 million for share value and US$10 million was for financial debt.

Integrated Services Ltd. (ISL), the Bangladeshi partner, was being 'officially' shown as purchasing the shares held by Technology Resources Industries (TRI) of Malaysia for $15 million. ISL then paid another $10 million to Standard Chartered Bank to settle Sheba's liabilities.

In September 2004, Orascom Telecom Holdings (currently Global Telecom Holding) purchased 100% of the shares of Sheba Telecom (Pvt.) Limited. It was acquired for US$60 million. Sheba had a base of 59,000 users, of whom 49,000 were regular when it was sold. Afterward it was re-branded and launched its services under the "Banglalink" brand on 10 February 2005.

In March 2008, Sheba Telecom (Pvt.) Limited changed its name to Orascom Telecom Bangladesh Limited, matching its parent company name.

In July 2013, following the 2011 ownership restructuring in the parent company, the company name changed for the second time to Banglalink Digital Communications Ltd.

In 2018, Netherlands based Veon Ltd (previously known as Vimpelcom) acquired Banglalink as wholly owned subsidiary.

In 2024 Banglalink sold out its tower assets to Summit Towers Ltd.

== Numbering scheme ==
Banglalink uses the following numbering scheme:

For General Subscribers

+88019N_{1}N_{2}N_{3}N_{4}N_{5}N_{6}N_{7}N_{8} & +88014N_{1}N_{2}N_{3}N_{4}N_{5}N_{6}N_{7}N_{8}

For IoT Subscribers +88061N_{1}N_{2}N_{3}N_{4}N_{5}N_{6}N_{7}N_{8}

Where '+880' is the ISD code for Bangladesh and is needed only in case of dialing from outside Bangladesh.

'19', '14' & '61' are the access codes for Banglalink as allocated by the Government of Bangladesh. Omitting +880 will require using 0 in place of it instead to represent local call, hence 019 & 014 are the general access codes. 061 is the IoT access code. N_{1}N_{2}N_{3}N_{4}N_{5}N_{6}N_{7}N_{8} is the subscriber number.

In 2018, when mobile number portability was introduced, users acquired the ability to port to any operator without changing its number.

== Network ==
Banglalink is the third-largest mobile operator of the country. As of February 2023, Banglalink had a total number of 14,500 base transceiver station (BTS) across the country.

=== National roaming coverage ===
Under national roaming, Banglalink users can use Teletalk network if Banglalink's network is weak or has no signal. This feature is now in trial mode. Banglalink uses 20,600 Mobile Network Towers to serve customers under national roaming network of Banglalink & Teletalk.

=== International roaming coverage ===
Banglalink has international roaming facilities.

== Products offered ==
=== Banglalink Enterprise ===
Banglalink Enterprise offers a wide range of products and services to suit the needs of the business community. It was first launched in December 2006. The current packages are:

- Enterprise corporate; targeted at the corporate segment
- Enterprise SME; targeted at the SME segment
- Enterprise personal

Before the launch of Banglalink enterprise, Banglalink served the business clientele through a similar platform named Banglalink professional.

== Customer care ==
Banglalink delivers customer care using its call centers and customer care networks. Currently, Banglalink provides customer care services to its clients through:

- Banglalink sales & care centres
- Banglalink points
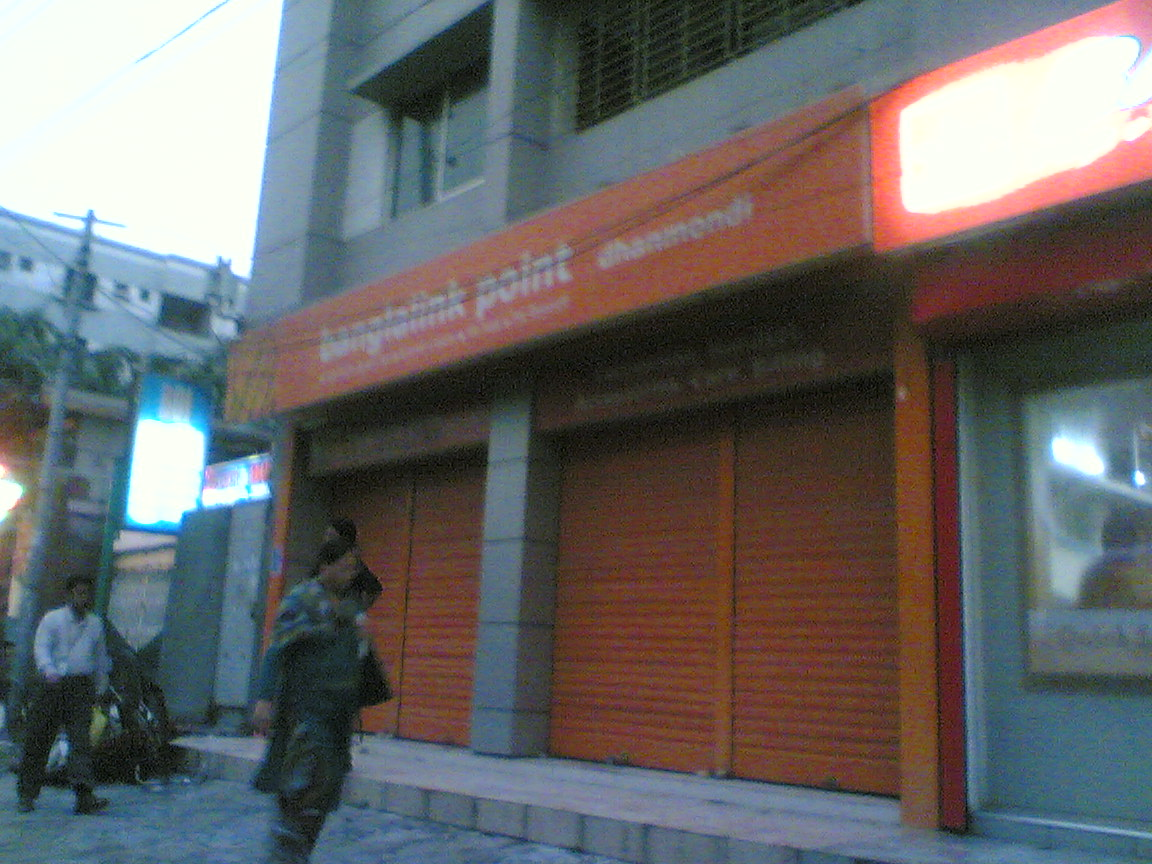
  Banglalink point at Dhanmondi.
  Banglalink Points are aimed at providing connections, handsets, accessories and provide selected customer services like SIM replacement, reconnection, bill payment etc. They are located at key points around the country. Kallol Group, a local distribution company, had partnered with Banglalink to operate at least forty Banglalink points throughout the country. As of March 2008, the deal with Kallol Group has been called off and Banglalink is focusing on managing its own customer care centers.
- Banglalink service points
- Banglalink care lines are call centres.

== Criticisms and penalty ==
In October 2007, BTRC fined Banglalink BDT 1.25 billion for its involvement in illegal VoIP or call termination business. The then BTRC chairman, Major General (Retd.) Manzurul Alam, confirmed Banglalink's involvement in the illegal trade. In a statement issued by Banglalink, the company agreed to make a one-time fixed payment of Tk 1.25 billion to the government as compensation for its loss of revenue.
