= Sam Pitroda =

Indian inventor and businessman (born 1942)

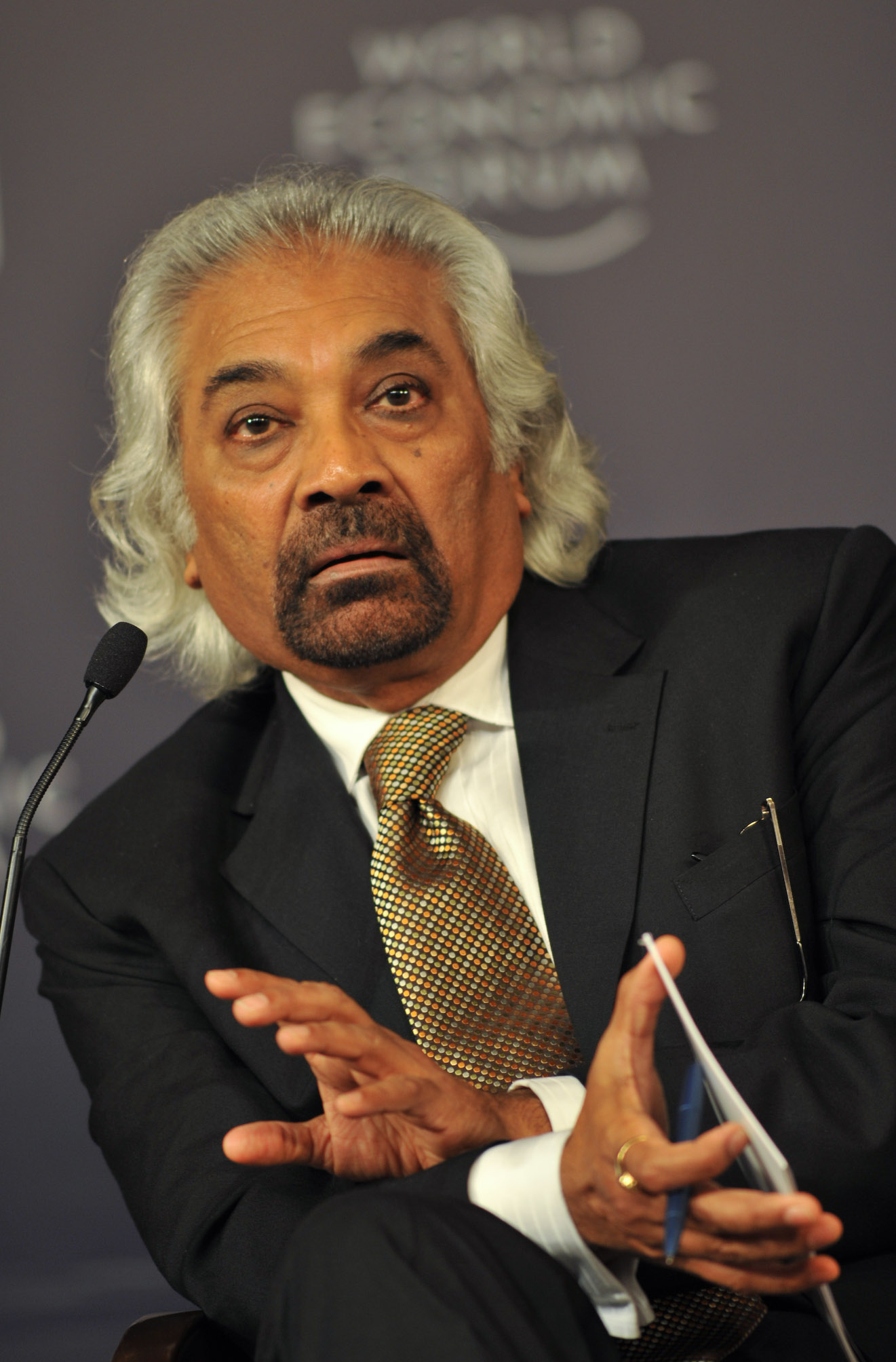
- Pitroda at the India Economic Summit 2009
- Born: 16 November 1942 (age 83); Titlagarh, Orissa Province, British India (present–day Odisha, India)
- Citizenship: India (birth; current); United States (former)
- Education: Maharaja Sayajirao University; Illinois Institute of Technology, Chicago
- Occupations: Telecom engineer, entrepreneur
- Employer(s): Former advisor to the Indian prime ministers Rajiv Gandhi and Manmohan Singh on Public Information, Infrastructure & Innovations (PIII)
- Political party: Indian National Congress
- Spouse: Anjana Pitroda (m. 1966)
- Website: www.sampitroda.com

Satyanarayan Gangaram Pitroda, popularly known as Sam Pitroda (born 16 November 1942), is an Indian official, telecommunications engineer, innovator, and entrepreneur. He was born in Titlagarh, in the eastern Indian state of Odisha, into a Gujarati family. He served as an advisor to Rajiv Gandhi and Manmohan Singh during their respective tenures as the Prime Minister of India, as well as to the United Nations. He is the chair of the Indian Overseas Congress. He is often credited as the “Father of India’s Telecom Revolution” for his role in modernizing the country’s communications infrastructure and shaping India’s technology landscape during the 1980s.

== Early life and career ==
Satyanarayan Gangaram Pitroda was born into a Gujarati Vishwakarma family in Orissa. In 1966, he began working for GTE in Chicago. He is considered a pioneer of portable computing, as he invented the electronic diary in 1975.

He holds a master's degree in Physics and Electronics from Maharaja Sayajirao University (India) and a Master's in Electrical Engineering from the Illinois Institute of Technology (USA).

== Government Advisor ==
Between 2005 and 2009, he chaired the National Knowledge Commission in India and served as an advisor to Prime Minister Manmohan Singh in the area of Public Information Infrastructure and Innovations. Since 2010, he has been the chair of the National Innovation Council.

== Return to India and later career ==
On a trip back to India in 1981, Pitroda was frustrated by how hard it was to call his family back in Chicago, and decided he could help modernize India's telecommunications system. In 1984, Pitroda was invited to return to India by Prime Minister Indira Gandhi. On his return, he started the Center for Development of Telematics C-DOT, an autonomous telecom R&D organization. He had previously become a naturalized US citizen but renounced his US citizenship to take Indian citizenship again to work in the Indian Government.

In the 1990s Pitroda returned to Chicago to resume his business interests. In May 1995, he became the first chair of WorldTel initiative of the International Telecommunication Union.

In 1993, Pitroda helped establish (with Darshan Shankar) the Foundation for Revitalisation of Local Health Tradition and The University of Trans-Disciplinary Health Sciences and Technology near Bangalore in India. The foundation promotes Ayurveda, India's traditional medicinal knowledge.

In October 2009, Pitroda was appointed as advisor to Indian Prime Minister Manmohan Singh on Public Information Infrastructure and Innovations with the rank of Cabinet Minister.

In 1992, his biography Sam Pitroda: A Biography was published.

== Awards ==
- Dataquest gave Pitroda a lifetime achievement award in 2002.
- In May 2010, the University of Illinois at Chicago college of medicine presented him an honorary degree.
- The Government of India awarded him the Padma Bhushan in 2009 for his contribution to science and engineering.
