= PeoplesTel =

Bangladeshi telecommunications company

Coordinates: 23.8775°N 90.4009°E

Peoples Telecommunication and Information Services Ltd.
- Company type: Private (Non-Government)
- Industry: Telecommunication
- Founded: Dhaka, Bangladesh
- Founder: Mr. T I M Nurun Nabi
- Headquarters: 1st Floor, Hayes & Haier Center, Plot 6, Road 7D, Uttara, Dhaka - 1230, Bangladesh, Dhaka
- Number of locations: 206 Exchanges nationwide
- Area served: All over Bangladesh
- Services: PSTN Telecom, Hosted Call Centre, Centrex, ISP
- Number of employees: 350+
- Website: ptelco.net

Peoples Telecommunication and Information Services Ltd., doing business as PeoplesTel (Bengali: পিপলসটেল), is a Bangladeshi fixed line operator. It is a private public switched telephone network (PSTN) operator, ISP and Hosted Call Centre Service Provider in Bangladesh.

== History ==
Peoples Telecommunication and Information Services Ltd. (PeoplesTel) (Bengali: পিপলসটেল) is the successor company of Bangladesh Rural Telecom Authority (BRTA) Pvt Ltd. Established in 1989 BRTA started its operation to provide digital communication in 203 rural Thanas (smallest administrative area of Bangladesh) throughout North, North-East and North-West region of the country. The agreement was made between the Bangladesh Government, represented by Bangladesh Telegraph & Telephone Board (BTTB), the Government owned telephone company. Later in 1993 this agreement was revised and BRTA was provided with the license to operate in 199 Thanas. By being the first private telecom operator in Bangladesh, BRTA paved the way for telecom privatisation in Bangladesh.

Newly formed BTRC divided the country into five operating zones for PSTN operators (North-West, North-East, South-West, South-East and Central). In 2003 BRTC decided to provide licenses for 4 out of the five zones, except Central zone. PeoplesTel obtained their 4 zonal license in 2004 and then on 17 March 2008 obtained the licence to operate in Central zone after BTRC decided to issue Central zone licenses to a number PSTN operators on 25 June 2007.

=== Chronology ===
1989: Bangladesh Rural Telecom Authority (BRTA) Rural PSTN license by the Ministry of Posts and Telecommunications of Bangladesh.

1993: License renewed.

15 December 2003: BRTA was bifurcated into two new companies with a mutual agreement among the Directors.

February 2004: PeoplesTel is incorporated and given licenses by BTRC to operate in four out of the five zones.

17 March 2008: PeoplesTel obtained the license to operate in the Central Zone (Dhaka), thus becoming a nationwide PSTN Operator.

== Company information ==
=== Key persons ===
- Chairman: Mr. T I M Nurun Nabi
- Directors: Mr. Shamim Shawkat and Mrs. Shamima Nabi

=== Subscriber base ===
As of January 2010, PeoplesTel has over 150 thousand subscribers nationwide.

== Numbering scheme ==
PeoplesTel uses the following numbering scheme for its subscribers:

+880 38 N_{1}N_{2}N_{3}N_{4}N_{5}N_{6}N_{7}N_{8}

where 880 is the International Subscriber Dialling Code for Bangladesh and is needed only in case of dialling from outside.

38 is the access code for PeoplesTel as allocated by the Government of Bangladesh. Omitting +880 will require to use 0 in place of it instead to represent local call, hence 038 is the general access code.

Although 038 has been allocated to PeoplesTel, 0381 is the local code for BTCL in Lakhipur and BTCL is in the process to phase out these numbers.

== Services ==
PeoplesTel provides a various range of services. Along with being a PSTN operator, PeoplesTel is also a nationwide ISP and Hosted Call Centre Service Provider.

PeoplesTel is the first operator in Bangladesh to launch telephony IP network. The system enables PeoplesTel to offer Postpaid and Prepaid Calling Card, Callback, Softphone and International Call Forwarding (ICF). Due to licensing restriction imposed by BTRC, calling card services and Softphone is currently not active. However, ICF, Web Call Back and voice mail services are active.

On 8 August 2009: PeoplesTel signed the largest ever telecommunication corporate deal with Jamuna Group for 31,000 fixed line phones, Centrex, Internet and data connectivity services. On 6 March 2007: PeoplesTel announces network expansion plan.
