= Banglalion =

Bangladeshi 4G wireless broadband operator

Banglalion Communications Ltd.
- Company type: Private
- Industry: Telecommunication
- Founded: 2008; 18 years ago
- Founder: Major (Retd.) Abdul Mannan
- Defunct: 2021; 5 years ago
- Headquarters: Dhaka, Bangladesh
- Area served: Countrywide of Bangladesh
- Key people: Major (Retd.) Abdul Mannan (Chairman)
- Services: Wireless broadband; Wi-Max
- Owner: Sunman Group
- Website: www.banglalion4g.com

Banglalion Communications Ltd was a privately held Bangladeshi 4G wireless broadband operator. It used WiMAX technology. It had a nationwide license from the Bangladesh Telecommunication Regulatory Commission (BTRC) to provide broadband wireless access services for data, voice and video. Banglalion covered 7 divisional headquarters and 30 major districts of Bangladesh.

== History ==
Banglalion was founded by Major (Retd.) Abdul Mannan in 2008, as a subsidiary of Sunman Group. The company won a Broadband Wireless Access (BWA) license to provide WiMAX technology countrywide in an auction held by the Bangladesh Telecommunication Regulatory Commission (BTRC) in the September of this year. The company raised Tk450 crore for its setup, with BDT 171 crore loan from 7 banks of Bangladesh, mainly AB Bank and BDT 130 crore from bonds.

By 2011, the operator garnered an overwhelming response with its subscriber count reaching 350,000. At the end of 2012, Banglalion started to expand its business to the major districts of Bangladesh along with divisional headquarters. It was the highest bidder, at Tk 2.15 billion ($31.4M as of September 2008), and chose spectrum in the 2585-2620 MHz bandwidth. In November 2009, it became the second operator, after Augere, to launch a WiMAX network in Bangladesh.

As of 2022, it does not provide any products.

== Services ==
Banglalion used to offer both postpaid and prepaid packages for its users. These packages came in different bandwidth and speed limits. Banglalion's competitors were Qubee and Ollo.

== Coverage ==
Banglalion used to cover 7 divisional cities Dhaka, Gazipur, Chittagong, Sylhet, Rajshahi, Khulna, Rangpur and Barisal. Network had rolled out in other major cities such as Munshiganj, Naraynganj, Rajbari, Mymensingh, Comilla, Noakhali, Laxmipur, Satkhira, Bogra, and Cox's Bazar.

== Banglalion officially shut down ==
In 2021, Banglalion's license was revoked and was officially shut down. In December 2020, Banglalion owed BTRC about BDT 205.94 crore. They cannot afford to repay this loan. As a result, despite the license being valid until 2023, Banglalion's license was revoked.
