= Telebarta =

Bangladeshi telephone operator

Telebarta (Bengali: টেলিবার্তা) is a private public switched telephone network (PSTN) operator in Bangladesh, with 56,424 subscribers as of May 2008.

== History ==
Telebarta is branded under jubok phone.

=== Loan default and legal proceedings ===
In 2004, a syndicate of six banks and financial institutions provided Jubo Karmasangsthan Society (Jubok) with a loan of Tk300 crore under the name of Telebarta, a proposed project to build 250 mobile towers and related infrastructure across Bangladesh. The project was later found to be fictitious, and Jubok defaulted on repayment.

By 2021, the outstanding amount, including interest, had risen to Tk446 crore. After a prolonged legal battle that began in 2008, the Artha Rin Adalat in Dhaka ruled in favor of the lenders, which included Dhaka Bank (the lead bank), AB Bank, Uttara Bank, People's Leasing and Financial Services, Phoenix Finance and Investment, and Premier Leasing and Finance Limited. The court ordered the auction of Jubok’s mortgaged properties, including a plot in the Tejgaon industrial area and land at Purana Paltan Lane in Dhaka, to recover the debt.

== Numbering scheme ==
Telebarta uses the following numbering scheme for its subscribers:

+880 36 N_{1}N_{2}N_{3}N_{4}N_{5}N_{6}N_{7}N_{8}

where 880 is the International Subscriber Dialling Code for Bangladesh and is needed only in case of dialling from outside.

036 is the access code for Telebarta as allocated by the Government of Bangladesh. Omitting +880 will require to use 0 in place of it instead to represent local call, hence 036 is the general access code.

== Offers and services ==
1. PCO package

2. Corporate package

3. SME package

== See also ==
- Communications in Bangladesh
