= WorldTel =

WorldTel Limited was established in January 1995 as part of an International Telecommunication Union initiative to help mobilize development of the telecommunications sector in developing countries. The primary catalyst for its creation was a McKinsey & Co. report recommending creation of a separate company for this purpose. Sam Pitroda, who developed the telecommunications services in India, became its first chairman in May 1995. In 1996, $10 million of financing was announced, along with plans for 50 million telephone lines. WorldTel UK was awarded a 2001 license for services in Bangladesh. In 2004 Swedtel, based in Stockholm, was purchased by WorldTel UK Limited.

In November 2007, Mohammad Nayeem Mehtab Chowdhury of WorldTel Bangladesh Holdings was arrested for allegedly forging the signature of Pitroda and withdrawing money from banks illegally that was intended for investment. In April 2008, WorldTel Bangladesh announced that Chowdhury was released and cleared of charges, and it would start service "soon" in Dhaka. In 2010, the Bangladesh Telecommunication Regulatory Commission raided the offices of WorldTel Bangladesh and seized voice over IP equipment. Around 2007 the UK company no longer filed financial statements, and was dissolved in 2011. The company maintained a web site through about 2010.
