= RanksTel =

Bangladeshi telecommunications company

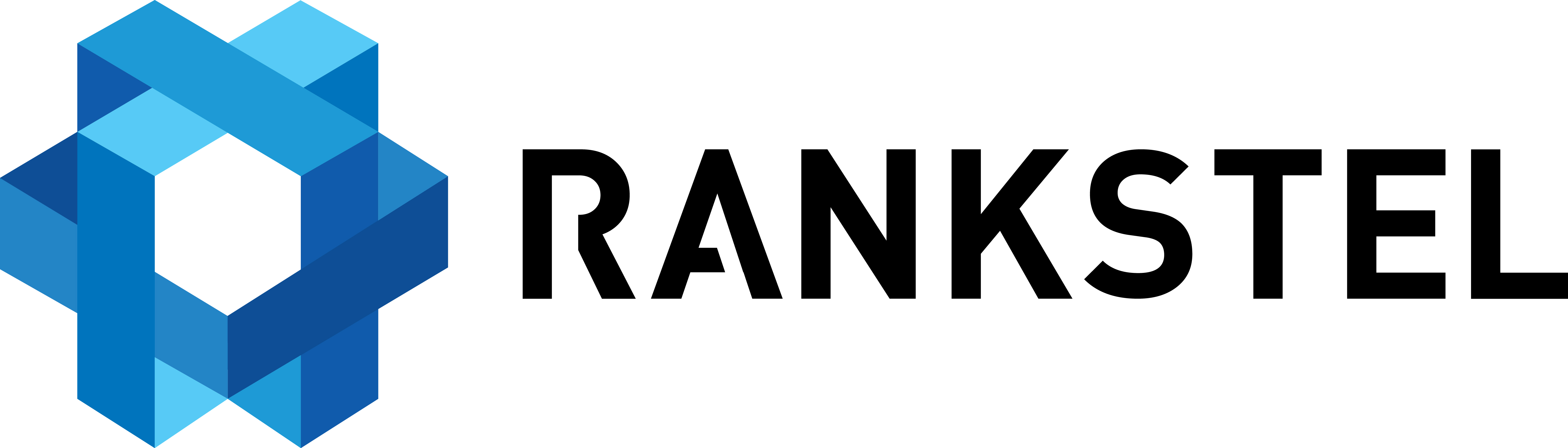
- Company type: Private (Non-Government)
- Industry: Telecom
- Founded: Dhaka, Bangladesh
- Founder: A. Rouf Chowdhury
- Headquarters: 117/A Old Airport Road, Bijoy Sharani, Tejgaon, Dhaka – 1215, Bangladesh
- Area served: Bangladesh
- Products: PSTN, VoIP, Broadband, Bulk SMS
- Website: rankstelecom.com

RanksTel (Bengali: র‌্যাংকসটেল) is a Bangladeshi telecommunications company. It is a private public switched telephone network (PSTN) operator in Bangladesh, and nation's second largest PSTN operator.in end of the 2023 many few Rankstel assets was sold to BSNL Mobile

Ranks Telecom Limited, a member of Rangs Group, launched its fixed line operation under the brand name RANKSTEL on 14 April 2005. RANKSTEL is registered with Registrar of Joint Stock Companies. RANKSTEL holds PSTN and ISP licenses to operate nationwide. RANKSTEL has also been awarded an International Gateway (IGW) license and currently originates and terminates international voice traffic.

RANKSTEL's physical infrastructure includes about 10 major hubs (switching and transmission) and more than 200 access nodes across the country.

== History ==
On 7 June 2004, Ranks Telecom Limited, a sister company of the RANGS Group, got a PSTN license to operate in Chittagong, Sylhet and Dhaka.

On 13 January 2005, RANKSTEL received an operational license from BTRC, allowing them to operate in Khulna and Bogra.

The firm launched its wireless phone service under the brand name of RanksTel on 14 April 2005.

On 9 September 2007, after more than two years of service, RANKSTEL received a nationwide PSTN license from the Bangladesh Telecom Regulatory Commission (BTRC).

On 19 March 2010, the BTRC shut down the phone line operations of RanksTel for allegedly running unlicensed VoIP operations. On 17 July 2011, RanksTel won approval to resume operations after a 16-month shutdown.

On 1 July 2012, RanksTel commercially relaunched their PSTN service.

On 8 January 2017, RanksTel launched a gigabit connectivity service and rebranded itself with a new logo.

== Number plan ==
RanksTel uses the following numbering scheme:

- +880 44 R_{1}R_{2}R_{3}R_{4}R_{5}R_{6}R_{7}R_{8}
  - +880 is the International subscriber dialling Code for Bangladesh.
  - 44 is the BTRC allocated code for RANKSTEL.
  - R_{1} is the local code for RANKSTEL
    - 7: Dhaka Central
    - 3: Chittagong
    - 9: Sylhet
    - 5: Bogra
    - 4: Khulna
    - 9: Dhaka
  - R_{2} is the Package identification number for the subscriber of RanksTel
  - R_{3} to R_{8} is Subscriber identification number for RanksTel
