= Onetel Communication Ltd. =

Onetel is a public switched telephone network operator in Bangladesh.

== History ==
Onetel has obtained license from Bangladesh Telecommunication Regulatory Commission to provide fixed phone services in the northwestern part (Rajshahi Division) of Bangladesh.

As of May 2008, total number of subscribers was 37.796 thousand.

== Numbering scheme ==
Onetel uses the following numbering scheme for its subscribers:

+880 64 N_{1}N_{2}N_{3}N_{4}N_{5}N_{6}N_{7}N_{8}

where 880 is the International Subscriber Dialling Code for Bangladesh and is needed only in case of dialing from elsewhere.

64 is the access code for RanksTel as allocated by the Government of Bangladesh. Omitting +880 requires using 0 instead to represent local call, hence 064 is the general access code.

== Services ==
Onetel has established three customer service centres in Rajshahi, Bogra and Rangpur.
