= Grameenphone =

Telecommunications provider in Bangladesh

Grameenphone Limited
- Native name: গ্রামীণফোন লিমিটেড
- Type: Public
- Traded as: DSE: GP; CSE: GP
- Industry: Mobile telecommunication services
- Founded: 26 March 1997; 29 years ago in Dhaka, Bangladesh
- Founder: Iqbal Quadir; Muhammad Yunus
- Headquarters: GP House, Bashundhara Residential Area, Dhaka, Bangladesh
- Area served: Nationwide
- Key people: Joergen C. Arentz Rostrup (Chairperson); Yasir Azman (CEO); Jens Becker (CFO)
- Products: List: Mobile Telephony; LTE; LTE+; VoLTE; VoWiFi; FDD; eSIM; 5G
- Brands: Skitto; GPay; Bioscope+; alo; gpfi
- Services: Mobile telephony; Mobile internet; Digital services
- Revenue: ▲ ৳150.4 billion (US$1.2 billion) (FY 2022)
- Operating income: ▲ ৳91.48 billion (US$750 million) (FY 2022)
- Net income: ▲ ৳30.09 billion (US$250 million) (FY 2022)
- Total assets: ▲ ৳185.09 billion (US$1.5 billion) (FY 2022)
- Number of employees: ▼1,475 (2021)
- Parent: Telenor (Norway Govt Owned) (55.80%); Grameen Telecom (34.20%)
- Website: grameenphone.com

Grameenphone Limited, widely abbreviated as (d/b/a) GP, is a mobile telecommunications service provider in Bangladesh. As of 2026, its subscribers span over 84.33 million, making it Bangladesh's largest mobile network and telecommunications conglomerate by both revenue and users. It is a joint venture between Norwegian government-owned Telenor and Bangladeshi Grameen Telecom. Telenor owns 55.8% of Grameenphone, Grameen Telecom owns 34.2%, and the remaining 10% is publicly held. As of 2026, Grameenphone is Bangladesh's most valuable company with a market cap of more than 339.1 billion BDT or 2.77 billion USD (approximately).

== History ==
Iqbal Quadir, established Grameenphone to provide universal mobile access across Bangladesh, including its rural regions. He was inspired by the Grameen Bank micro-credit model and envisioned a business model where a cell phone can serve as a source of income. After leaving his job as an investment banker in the United States, Quadir met and successfully raised money from New York-based investor and philanthropist Joshua Mailman. He then returned to Bangladesh and worked for three years to gain support from organizations such as Grameen Bank and the Norwegian telecom company, Telenor. As part of this partnership, Muhammad Yunus, founder of Grameen Bank, created Grameen Telecom to be a major shareholder of Grameenphone.

Grameenphone was the first company to introduce GSM technology over 900 and 1800 MHz in Bangladesh. It was also the first company to introduce 5G network in the country, for which the first test was done in Dhaka and Chittagong metropolitan area in mid-2022. In September 2022, Grameenphone successfully conducted trials for the second time in Dhaka, Chittagong, Sylhet, Khulna, Rajshahi, Barishal, Mymensingh and Rangpur cities.

On 1 September 2025, Grameenphone launched 5G services in Bangladesh with initial rollouts in the aforementioned cities, being the second telecom operator in Bangladesh after Robi to commercially launch 5G services.

=== Changing logo ===
On 16 November 2006, Grameenphone officially changed its logo to match its parent company Telenor's logo.

== Numbering scheme ==
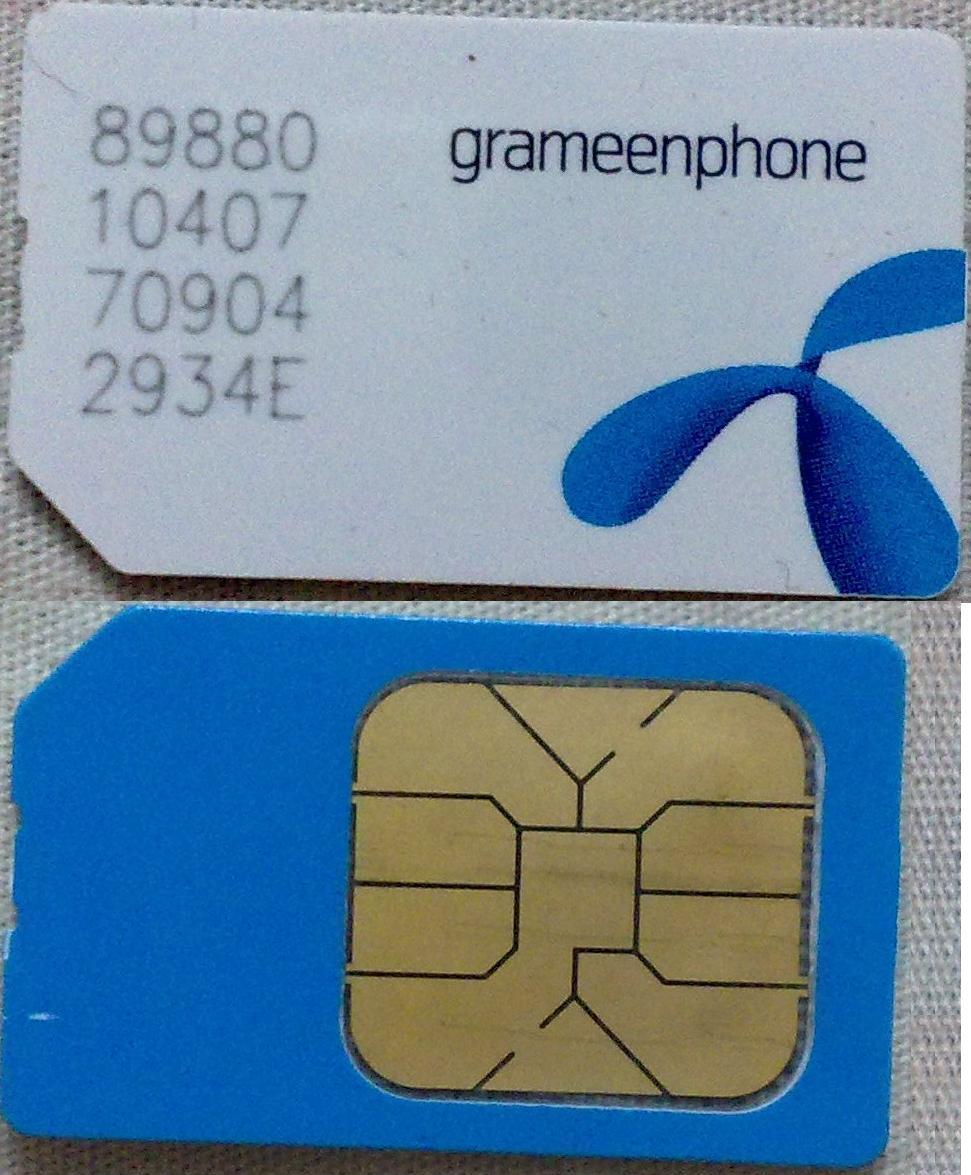
Typical Grameenphone 2G SIM Card

Grameenphone uses the following numbering scheme for its subscribers:

For General Subscribers:

- +880 13 XXXXXXXX
- +880 17 XXXXXXXX

For IoT Subscribers:

- +880 64 XXXXXXXX

880 is the ISD code for Bangladesh and is needed only in case of dialing from outside Bangladesh (otherwise, it may be substituted by a 0, making the prefix 013 & 017).

13, 17 & 64 is the prefix for Grameenphone as allocated by the government of Bangladesh. The following eight-digit number XXXXXXXX is the subscriber number. After exhausting the 017 series, Grameenphone became the first operator to launch a second series, the 013.

In 2018, when Mobile number portability was introduced users can port to any operator without changing its number.

== Customers ==
As of May 2025, total number of customer are 86.17 Million.

== Network ==
According to Grameenphone, it has invested more than BDT 347.4 billion (US$4.12 billion) to build the network infrastructure since 2018. Grameenphone has built the largest cellular network in the country. According to annual report of 2024, GP (Grameenphone) had 22,991 Mobile Network towers or BTS, which geographically covers the largest population of Bangladesh with mobile network services.

== Spectrums ==
The Grameenphone network is also GPRS/EDGE/3G-enabled, with a growing 4G network, allowing internet access within its coverage area. its spectrum volume is 127. 4 MHz, 107.4 MHz are currently being used by Grameenphone, the remaining 20 MHz will be added from June 2025. Besides, Grameenphone is trying to buy more 850 bands of 10 MHz spectrum.

Frequencies used on Grameenphone Network in Bangladesh
Band	Frequency	Frequency Width	Protocol	Notes
8	900 MHz	7.4;MHz	EDGE / LTE / LTE	
3	1800 MHz	20;MHz	EDGE / LTE / LTE-A, 2CC,3CC,4CC,5CC	
1	2100 MHz	20;MHz	LTE / LTE-A, 2CC,3CC,4CC,5CC	
41	2600 MHz	80;MHz	LTE / LTE-A, 2CC,3CC,4CC,5CC	

== Products and services ==
Grameenphone introduced pre-paid mobile phone service in Bangladesh in September 1999 via an EDGE/GPRS/3G/4G enabled network. Grameenphone was the first mobile operator in Bangladesh to offer internet via EDGE and 3G 4G services to its subscribers.

In March 2022, Grameenphone became the first mobile network operator in Bangladesh with embedded-SIM (eSIM) support.

=== Bioscope ===
Bioscope Bangladesh
- Website type: Video streaming, internet television
- Available in: Bangla, English
- Headquarters: Basundhara, Baridhara, Dhaka
- Area served: Bangladesh
- Owner: Grameenphone Limited
- Industry: Streaming
- Website: bioscopelive.com
- Registration: Optional, payment required for specific content
- Launched: September 2016

Bioscope (Live TV) is a video streaming platform for original shows, dramas, movies and live tv launched in 2016.

=== Bioscope+ ===
Bioscope+
- Developer: Grameenphone
- Release: July 11, 2025
- Stable release: 5.2.4
- Operating system: Android, iOS
- Platform: Mobile app, Web
- Available in: Bengali, English
- Type: Media aggregator, Streaming
- License: Proprietary
- Website: bioscopelive.com

Bioscope+ is a Bangladeshi media aggregator and digital streaming platform developed and operated by Grameenphone. It was officially launched on July 11, 2025 as part of the broader Grameenphone One digital ecosystem. Bioscope+ offers content aggregation from over 11 local and international OTT (Over-the-Top) platforms, including Chorki, Hoichoi, and others.

=== Ekhanei.com ===
Ekhanei.com was an e-commerce service (also known as CellBaazar) to enable users to sell or buy products through mobile or internet. It was free to use for all Grameenphone customers but was closed in 2017.

=== Other services ===
- GPAY is a service to enable users to pay their utility bills through mobile launched in 2016.
- Mobileplay is an online gaming service.

== Other activities ==
=== Village phone ===
With the help of Grameenphone, Grameen Telecom operates the national Village Phone program, alongside its own parent Grameen Bank and the International Finance Corporation (IFC), acting as the sole provider of telecommunications services to a number of rural areas. Most Village Phone participants are women living in remote areas. Village Phone works as an owner-operated GSM payphone whereby a borrower takes a BDT 12,000 (US$200) loan from Grameen Bank to subscribe to Grameenphone and is then trained on how to operate it and how to charge others to use it at a profit. As of September 2006, there are more than 255,000 Village Phones in operation in 55,000 villages around Bangladesh. This program has been replicated also in some other countries including Uganda and Rwanda in Africa.

=== Grameenphone Corporate Headquarter (GP House) ===
Grameenphone Corporate Headquarter (popularly known as "GP House"). Located at Bashundhara R/A, Dhaka, was formally inaugurated on 23 November 2010. GP House is considered one of the successful office buildings in Bangladesh. It has been designed by Architect Mohammad Foyez Ullah, Mustapha Khalid Palash and their team.

=== Community Information Centers ===
Community Information Center (CIC) or GPCIC was an initiative aimed at providing internet access and other communications services to rural areas. In February 2006, 26 CICs were established across the country as a pilot project. In this project, Grameenphone provided GSM/EDGE/GPRS infrastructure and technical support and other partners Grameen Telecom Corporation and Society for Economic and Basic Advancement (SEBA), were involved in selecting and training entrepreneurs to run the village centers. These CICs were used for a wide variety of business and personal purposes, from accessing health and agricultural information to using government services to video conferencing with relatives overseas. Grameenphone also trained entrepreneurs so that they could demonstrate to people how to set up an e-mail account and best make use of the Internet. Currently, none of the CICs are being operated by GP.

=== Grameenphone Centres ===
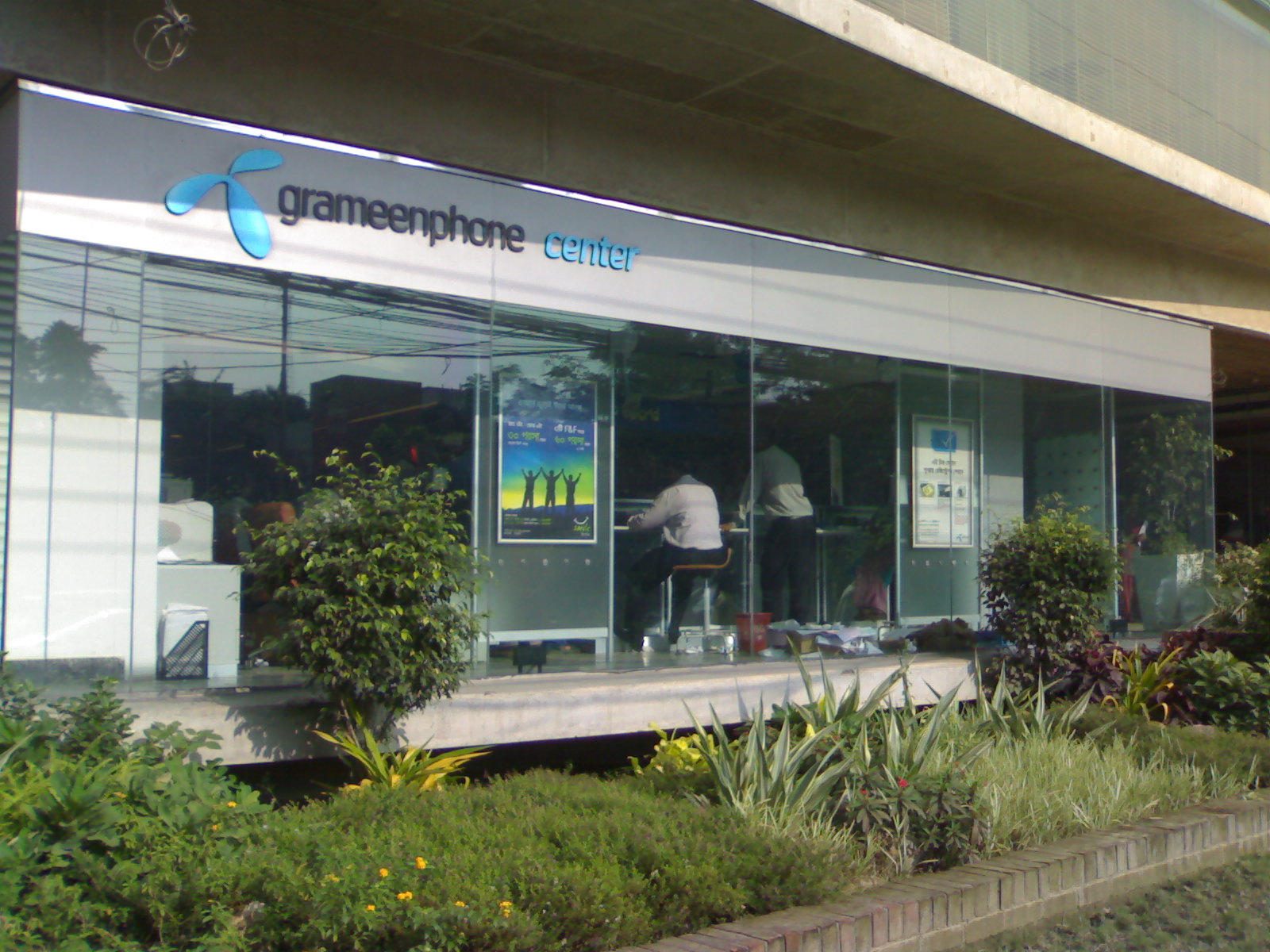
A GPC at Gulshan, Dhaka

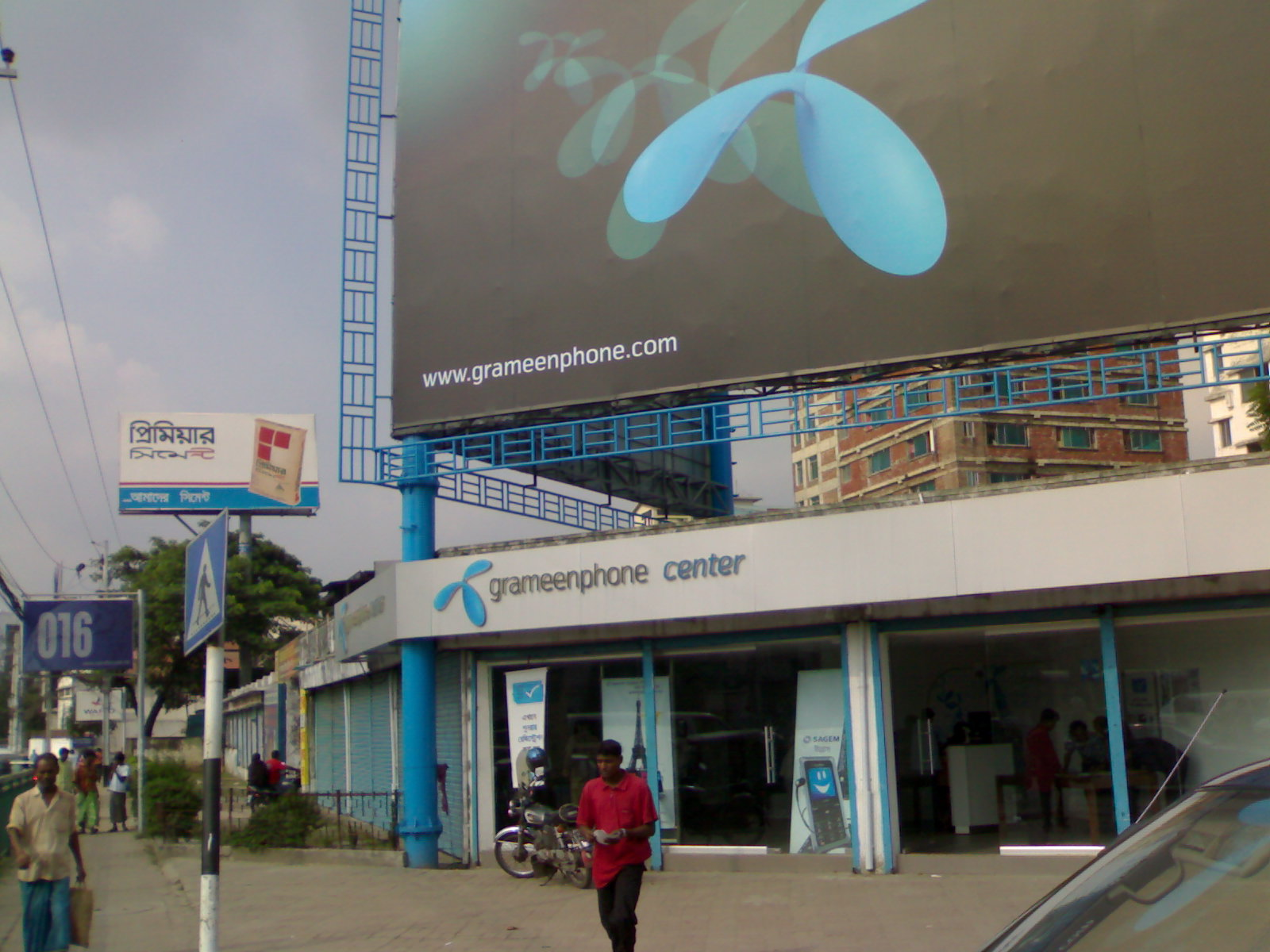
A franchised Grameenphone centre at Tejgaon, Dhaka

A Grameenphone Centre (GPC) serves as a "one-stop solution" for customers, with all telecommunications products and services, under a single roof. A Grameenphone Centre also sells phones from vendors like Samsung, Apple, Xiaomi and more. EDGE/GPRS modems and accessories such chargers and headphones are also sold at GPCs.

As of February 2013, there are 85 GPCs and they are strategically located at all major locations of the country operated by Grameenphone. There are two GP Lounges for customer experience of GP Digital Services. There are also 376,285 unique recharge outlets and 6,836 GP Express Stores all across Bangladesh.
