= Bangladesh Telecommunications Company Limited =

Largest telco in Bangladesh

Bangladesh Telecommunications Company Limited (BTCL)
- Emblem of BTCL
- Native name: বাংলাদেশ টেলিকমিউনিকেশন্স কোম্পানি লিমিটেড (বিটিসিএল)
- Formerly: Bangladesh Telegraph & Telephone Board (BTTB)
- Industry: Telecommunications
- Founded: 1971 (as BTTB); 1 July 2008; 18 years ago (as BTCL)
- Headquarters: BTCL 37/E Eskaton Garden, Dhaka, Bangladesh
- Revenue: BDT 44.35 billion (2023-24)
- Owner: Government of Bangladesh
- Website: btcl.gov.bd btcl.bd

Bangladesh Telecommunications Company Limited (BTCL) is the largest telecommunications company in Bangladesh. The company was founded as the Bangladesh Telegraph & Telephone Board (BTTB) following Bangladesh's independence in 1971. This was converted into corporate body named "Telegraph and Telephone Board" by promulgation of Telegraph and Telephone Board Ordinance, 1975. On 1 July 2008, the BTTB became a public limited company and was renamed as BTCL. The Bangladesh government initially owned all BTCL shares, but stated it would sell the shares to the public the following year. The estimated value of BTCL is ৳15,000 crore (৳150 billion). BTCL has a total of 12,636 officials and staff.

BTCL provides land-line telephone services in Bangladesh's urban areas, including domestic long-distance calling and international services as well as internet services. In 2004, the Bangladesh Government issued a number of PSTN licenses to private companies, but they were barred from providing services in the lucrative Dhaka market (which accounts for the majority of the nationwide market). The BTCL monopoly ended when other operators started to receive licenses from 2007.

== History ==
=== Early history ===
The Telegraph branch under the Posts and Telegraph Department was created in 1853 in the then British India, and was regulated afterwards under the Telegraph Act-1885. The Telegraph branch was reconstructed in 1962 in the then East Pakistan as Pakistan Telegraph and Telephone Department.

=== Post-independence ===
Old Logo of BTCL, formerly known as BTTB

Following Bangladesh's independence, the Bangladesh Telegraph and Telephone Department was set up under the Ministry of Posts and Telecommunications in 1971. This was converted into a corporate body named 'Telegraph and Telephone Board' by promulgation of Telegraph and Telephone Board Ordinance, 1975. Pursuant to a 1979 ordinance, the Telegraph and Telephone Board was converted into a government board named the Bangladesh Telegraph and Telephone Board (BTTB).

=== Bangladesh Telecommunications Company Limited ===
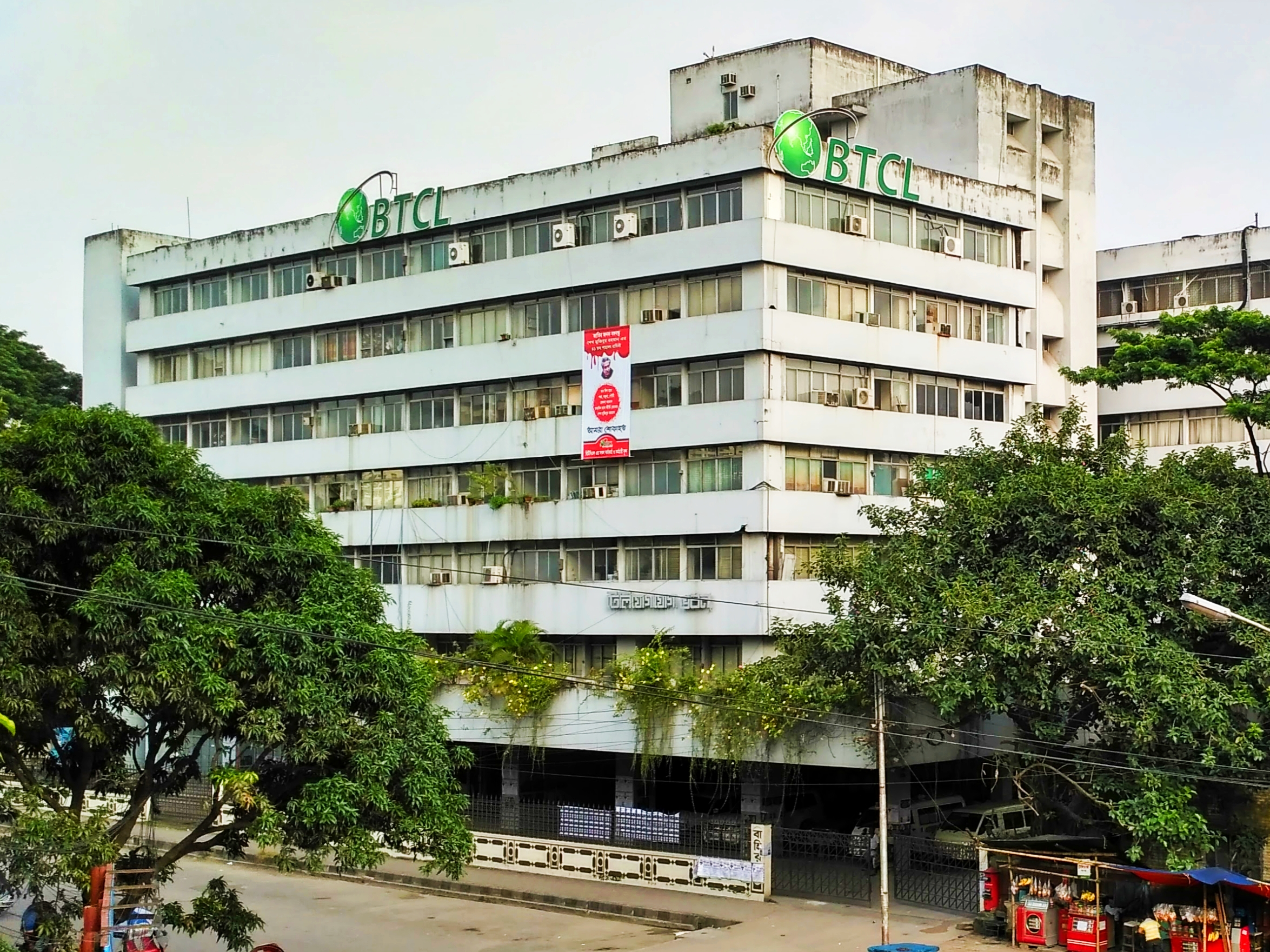
BTCL HQ, Telejogajog Bhaban, 37/E, Eskaton Garden, Dhaka, Bangladesh.

On 1 July 2008, BTTB transformed to a government-owned Public Limited Company under a new name of Bangladesh Telecommunications Company Limited BTCL. BTCL has launched a 24-hour call centre for customers. Customers in Dhaka will be able to call the number and reach the BTCL for enquiry, according to a company media release. BTCL runs a red telephone exchange for the VIPs which is secured and always live.

== Internet services ==
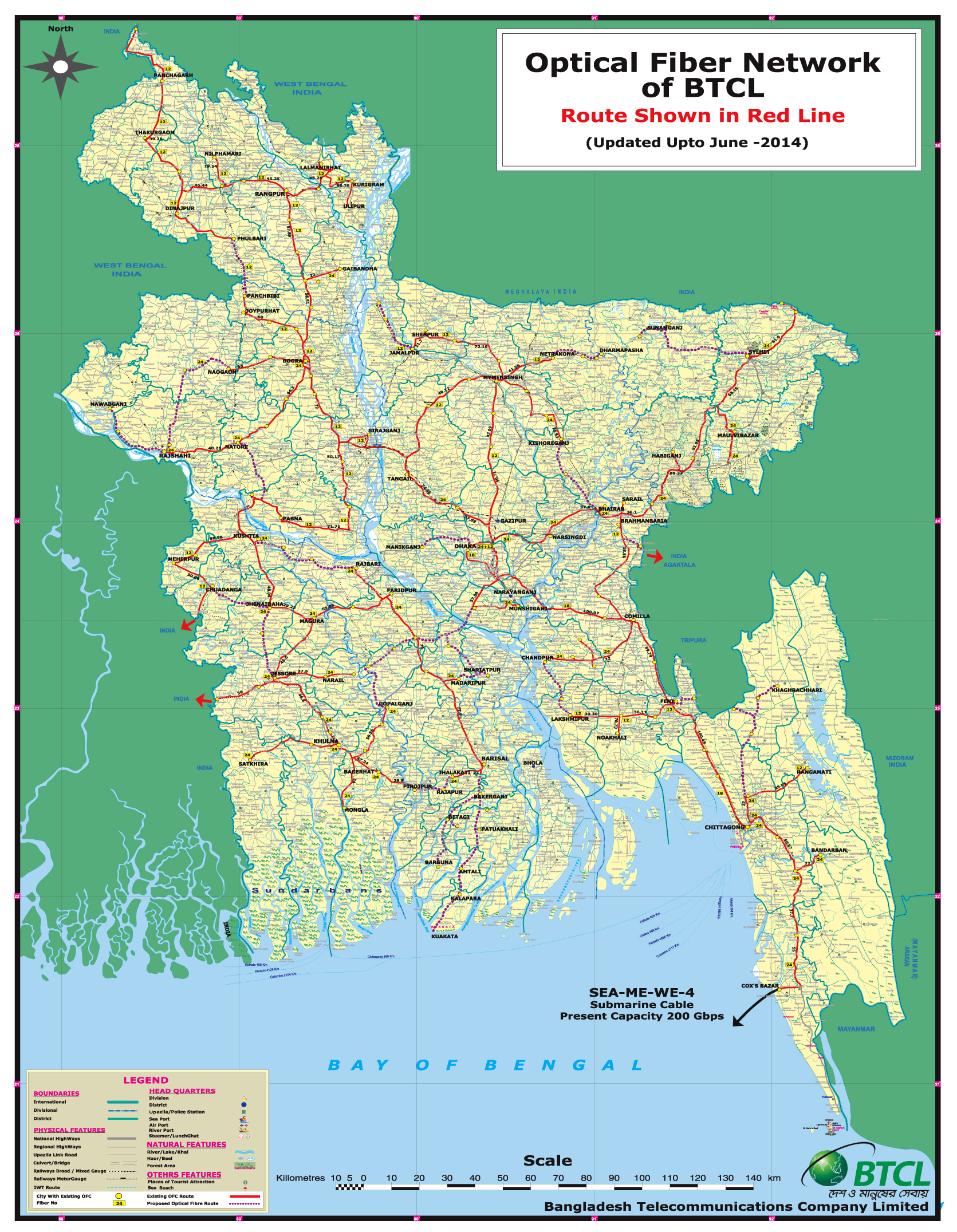

BTCL provides dial-up Internet access in all 64 districts of the country, making it the most-accessible Internet service provider in the country. As of January 2009, its total dial-up subscriber is 32,433. Since the beginning of 2007 BTCL have improved its Dial-up Internet service for better customer satisfaction. It also handles the .bd Internet country code top-level domain (ccTLD) for Bangladesh.

BTCL provides consumer-level broadband Internet services under the branding of BCUBE. The service is provided through ADSL2+ technology. BTCL has outsourced its BCUBE sales and customer support to EMEM Systems Ltd, System & Services Ltd (SSL) and Sisview Technologies Ltd. Till now btcl have got about 15,000 customers. BTCL's monthly income is about ৳19,000,000 per month from this service.

The state-owned telephony firm will develop a broadband wireless access network across the country soon with Korean help to provide uninterrupted upgraded services to its clients, officials said. Bangladesh Telecommunications Company Limited (BTCL) in cooperation with Korean Economic Development Cooperation Fund (EDCF) will establish the modern network.

== Mobile Network Service ==
BTCL will also offer mobile network service as an MVNO. BTCL is the first & only Mobile Virtual Network Operator. Instead of using own tower, BTCL will use other operators Tower through active infrastructure sharing.

== Satellites ==
Bangladesh's first satellite on Earth's orbit will have 40 transponders to provide telecommunications and broadcast services. US-based Space Partnership International (SPI) has already started designing the satellite and will also help launch it under a contract signed with the government. The two ground stations that will control the satellite will be built at Gazipur's Joydebpur and Rangamati's Betbunia on the land owned by Bangladesh Telecommunications Company Limited (BTCL). The government plans to have the satellite, named after the Father of the Nation Bangabandhu Sheikh Mujibur Rahman, sent to space by June 2017.

== Bill defaults ==
BTCL Managing Director eng Mahfuz Uddin Ahmed said it undertook a scheme to realise the outstanding phone bills from government and private agencies, and general customers by giving them 5–6 months. "If this flexible approach fails to realise the dues, we'll take legal action against the defaulters," he added. Mahfuz also said they were trying to realise outstanding phone bills of ৳1,062 crore (৳10.62 billion) from different international call carriers through legal procedure. According to BTCL statistics, government agencies owe ৳102.46 crore, semi-govt organisations ৳12.10 crore, private agencies ৳313.18 crore, Bangladesh Railway ৳1.12 crore, and newspapers/agencies ৳1.17 crore to BTCL. Besides, ৳247.65 crore have been due as some telephone lines were disconnected due to non-payment of bills. Moreover, 15 foreign private carriers (pre-paid system) have a total of ৳10.93 crore due to BTCL, while 52 foreign private carriers (post-paid system) ৳989.11 crore and 26 national foreign carriers ৳73.55 crore. BTCL Director (international) Sharifuzzaman said international calls enter Bangladesh using BTCL's network, and the call carriers have to pay ৳1.5 cent per minute.

== Graft and controversy ==
Bangladesh Telecommunications Company Limited (BTCL) suffered a revenue loss of at least ৳2,000 crore over the previous six years because of corruption, according to a TIB study published in April 2014. Transparency International Bangladesh (TIB) identified tampering with BTCL’s international call records as one of the company’s major areas of corruption.

Bangladesh’s state-owned telecommunications company also refused to reconnect a British firm to the country’s network, despite being ordered to do so by the courts. London-based Zamir Telecom had been disconnected from the Bangladesh network since March, causing it significant financial damage. Bangladesh’s controversial telecoms minister, Abdul Latif Siddique, admitted that he had ordered Zamir Telecom’s disconnection from Bangladesh Telecommunications Company Limited (BTCL), in breach of a 2010 court order that had overturned a similar action. Zamir Telecom successfully challenged BTCL in a Dhaka court in early May, when judges ordered the company to be reconnected within 36 hours. However, the court order was ignored again, purportedly because of ongoing arbitration between BTCL and Zamir Telecom over disputed invoicing, despite the judges stating that the connection must be maintained during the talks.

On 25 August 2013, the Anti-Corruption Commission approved the filing of four cases against 22 people, including Managing Director SOM Kalim Ullah and three former managing directors of Bangladesh Telecommunications Company Limited, in connection with the embezzlement of more than ৳5.75 billion through illegal Voice over Internet Protocol business. ACC Commissioner M Shahabuddin said the commission had approved the cases at a recent meeting, adding, “Since we have found their involvement in the graft allegation the commission has taken the decision.” BTCL Managing Director SOM Kalim Ullah, former managing directors SM Khabiruzzaman, Afsar-ul-Alam and AM Abu Sayed Khan, former member (maintenance and operation) Mohammad Tawfiq, former divisional engineers Ronel Chakma and Habibur Rahman Pramanik, Ericsson Bangladesh Ltd’s Contract Manager Asif Jahid, Relation Manager Nazrul Islam and engineer Masrurul Hakim were to be accused in the cases. ACC officials said that BTCL officials, in connivance with Ericsson Bangladesh Ltd, embezzled the money by erasing incoming international call minutes from the call detail records of ITX-5 and ITX-7.

== See also ==
- T&T Club Motijheel
