= Pakistan International Airlines Flight 661 =

Aviation accident in Havelian, Pakistan

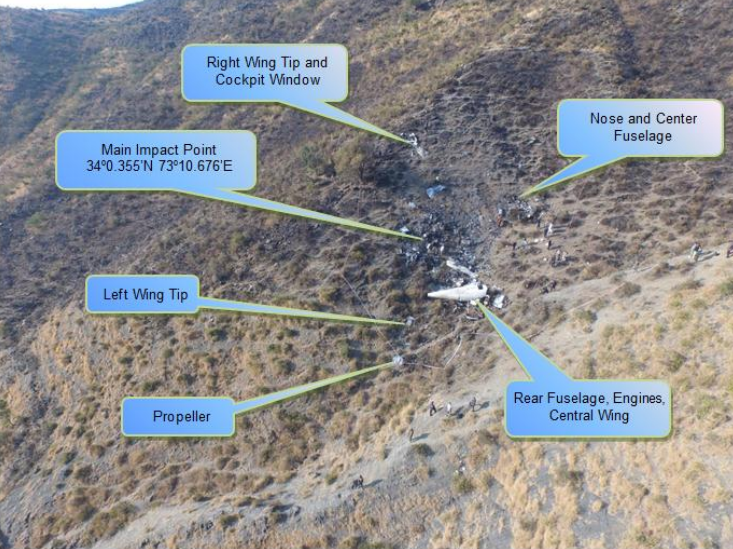
- View of the crash site

Accident
- Date: 7 December 2016
- Summary: Engine failure due to maintenance error, leading to loss of control
- Site: Near Havelian, Pakistan; 34°0.355′N 73°10.676′E

Aircraft
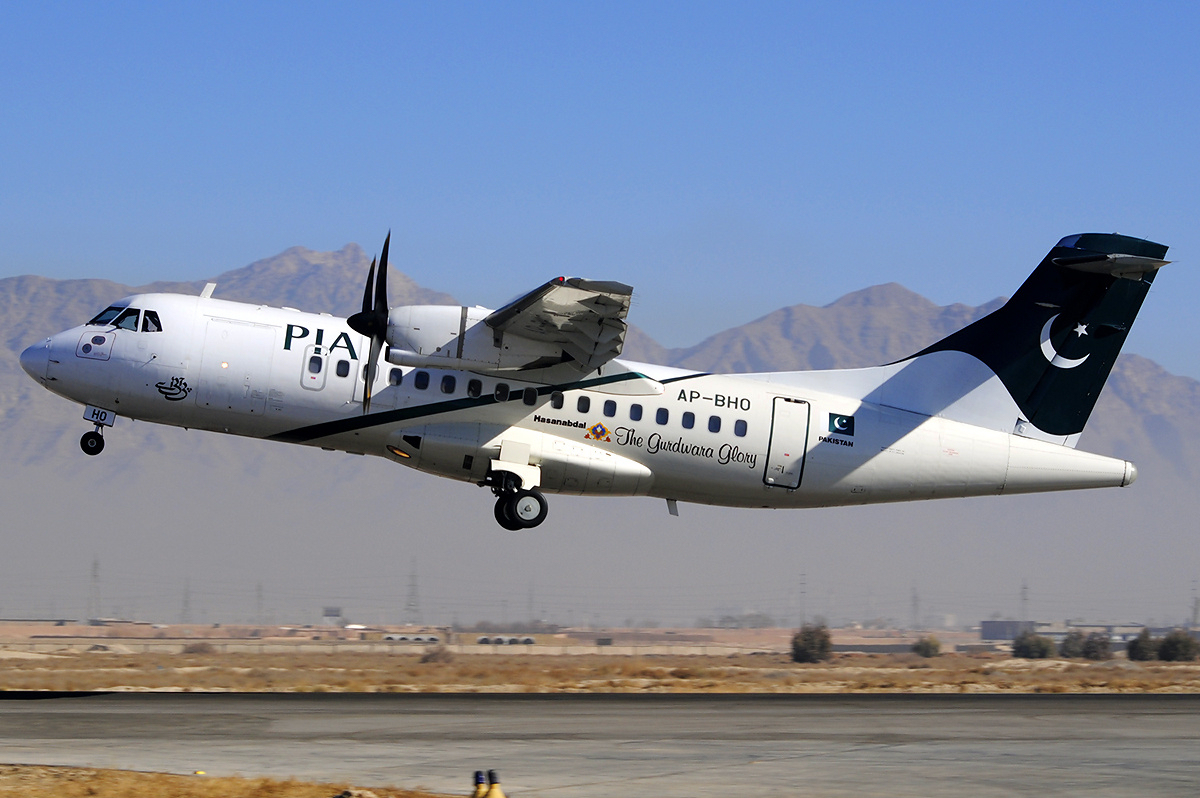
- AP-BHO, the aircraft involved in the accident, in 2011
- Aircraft type: ATR 42-500
- Aircraft name: Hasanabdal
- Operator: Pakistan International Airlines
- IATA flight No.: PK661
- ICAO flight No.: PIA661
- Call sign: PAKISTAN 661
- Registration: AP-BHO
- Flight origin: Chitral Airport, Chitral, Pakistan
- Destination: Benazir Bhutto International Airport, Islamabad, Pakistan
- Occupants: 47
- Passengers: 42
- Crew: 5
- Fatalities: 47
- Survivors: 0

Pakistan International Airlines Flight 661 was a Pakistani domestic passenger flight from Chitral to Islamabad, operated by Pakistan's flag carrier Pakistan International Airlines. On 7 December 2016, the aircraft serving the route, an ATR 42-500 twin-turboprop, crashed near Havelian following an engine failure. All 47 people on board died, including singer-turned-preacher and entrepreneur Junaid Jamshed, and the Deputy Commissioner of the District of Chitral.

Four years after the crash, Pakistan Aircraft Accident Investigation Board (AAIB) published the result of their investigation. In the final report, the crash was described as a unique case and the first ever of its kind in the entire operational life of ATR aircraft. The aircraft's left engine had failed mid-flight and the aircraft's safety system prevented the pilots from resolving the issues, which led to the sudden appearance of a huge amount of drag on the left side. The bizarre nature of the emergency that the crew faced eventually caused them to lose control. The investigation further revealed that faulty maintenance practices within PIA were to blame for such failures and the issue had been allowed to happen by weak oversight by the airline and the nation's aviation regulatory body.

The complex nature of the crash led to the issuance of several recommendations, two of which were urgent enough that mentioned parties were asked to comply immediately. Following the discovery of loopholes within CAA oversight, AAIB ordered authorities to impose stricter monitoring regarding airworthiness and airliner operation in the country. Pakistan's CRM training system was asked to be revamped. While extremely remote, there were also fears from the investigators about the possibility of another similar crash in the future. The manufacturer of the aircraft, ATR, was asked to include a specific procedure to safely recover from the situation.

== Background ==
=== Aircraft ===
The aircraft involved in the accident was an ATR 42-500, serial number 663, registration AP-BHO, delivered to Pakistan International Airlines (PIA) in 2007. The aircraft was part of the replacement aircraft for PIA's aging Fokker fleet.

In 2009, the aircraft was damaged during a landing attempt at Lahore, but was subsequently repaired and returned to service. It sustained an engine failure in 2014, but the engine was replaced and no further problems were reported. By the time of the crash, it had recorded more than 18,700 flight hours since joining PIA's fleet and had last undergone certification in October 2016.

=== Passengers and crew ===
Nationality	Fatalities		Total
Nationality	Passengers	Crew	Total
Austrian	1	0	1
Chinese	1	0	1
Pakistani	39	5	44
South Korean	1	0	1
Total	42	5	47

Forty-two passengers, including two infants, were on board the aircraft. The passengers included 39 Pakistani citizens, and one Austrian, one Chinese and one South Korean national. The passengers included Pakistani singer-turned-preacher Junaid Jamshed who was traveling with his wife Nahya Junaid. Shahzada Farhad Azis, a member of Chitral's traditional royal family who was flying with his wife and daughter, Deputy Commissioner of Chitral District Osama Ahmed Warraich, two sky marshals and an Aircraft Maintenance Engineer were also among the passengers. There were 20 Chitral residents on board.

The flight manifest showed that there were five flight crew: 43-year-old Captain Saleh Janjua, 40-year-old First Officer Ali Akram, 26-year-old trainee pilot Ahmed Janjua (no relation to the captain), and two flight attendants Sadaf Farooq and Asma Adil. Captain Janjua was reported to be an experienced pilot with over 12,000 flight hours during his career. He was also a type-rated instructor for ATR aircraft. First Officer Akram was also an experienced pilot with over 3,600 flight hours on the ATR-42 while trainee First Officer Ahmed Janjua joined PIA in 2014 and had accrued a total flying experience of more than 1,400 hours on the ATR-42.

== Flight ==
A map showing the locations of the Chitral airport (CJL); Islamabad's Benazir Bhutto International Airport (ISB); and Havelian, the location of the crash site.

Flight 661 was a flight from Chitral, the capital of Chitral District located in the mountainous region of Khyber Pakhtunkhwa, to Pakistan's capital of Islamabad. The flight was scheduled for twice a week and was expected to take off at 15:30 PST. The expected time of arrival in Islamabad's Benazir Bhutto International Airport was at around 16:40 local time.

The aircraft left Chitral Airport's Runway 20 at 15:38, with trainee first officer Ahmed Janjua as the pilot flying and Captain Saleh Janjua as the co-pilot and pilot monitoring. The trainee first officer was flying for route familiarization, while another cockpit crew, First Officer Akram, was sitting at the back of the cockpit on the jumpseat to observe him as well. The weather in the region was fine and there was no recorded significant activity on the radar.

Cruising at FL135, the airspeed was stabilized at 186 knots. After everything was set, Captain Janjua decided to make an announcement to the passengers.

=== Start of anomaly ===
While he was making the announcement, he was interrupted by the trainee first officer, who informed him that an alert of a mechanical fault on the Propeller Electrical Control-1 (PEC-1) had suddenly appeared. Captain Janjua asked the crew to read the procedure checklist for such issue and ordered the trainee first officer to call the flight engineer in the cabin to the cockpit. He turned his attention back to the PA system to complete his announcement. After completing it, he asked the crew to read the checklist again. The crew decided to reset the PEC-1. By this time, the airspeed had dropped to 146 knots (270 km/h; 168 mph).

The alert appeared for the second time. First Officer Akram, who was sitting on the cockpit jumpseat, asked the throttle lever to be moved to 100% and to override the PEC, while Captain Janjua asked the trainee first officer to read the checklist once more. The lever was moved to 100% while the PEC was put into a reset again for three times, but the fault stayed on. Failing to resolve the issue, they decided to switch off the PEC. Meanwhile, the airspeed started to increase due to the lever setting.

In accordance with PIA's policy, Captain Janjua took over the controls from the trainee first officer while First Officer Akram switched his seat with the latter pilot, becoming the co-pilot for the rest of the flight. Shortly after, Captain Janjua informed the controller in Cherat about his intention to switch to Islamabad Control. The controller approved his request and asked the crew to report back once they had reached Islamabad.

Shortly after, the pilots began to notice an abnormal sound coming from the engines. The torque of the left engine rapidly dropped from 75% to 0%, while the speed of the left propeller quickly accelerated to 102%. The airspeed immediately dropped to 154 knots (285 km/h; 177 mph) and the aircraft started to drift towards the left. Captain Janjua announced that they had lost the left engine and attempted engine feathering. The fuel flow to the engine was shut off and the engine was shut down. The crew successfully slowed the loss of airspeed. The speed of the left propeller then decreased, hovering at around 25%.

=== Struggle for control ===
External videos
- ATC recording
- ATC recording during the accident on YouTube

At 16:11 local time, Captain Janjua ordered First Officer Akram to request permission for the flight to descend and to make a mayday call. During this time, the speed of the left propeller was still relatively low, with an amount of below 25%. The speed then gradually increased to 50% in 26 seconds before it suddenly jumped to 120 – 125% in just 8 seconds. The cockpit crew initially didn't notice the change in the sound of the propeller, but when the propeller suddenly accelerated it took the crew by surprise as the noise quickly intensified, prompting Captain Janjua to ask the crew about the sound. While he was asking, the sound continued to become louder and a massive drag force had just been generated on the left side of the aircraft.

The heavy drag led the autopilot to be disconnected and caused the aircraft to start banking gradually to the left. The aircraft was then manually flown by the pilots. Due to the massive left drag, Captain Janjua had to apply excessive force to the rudder and aileron to keep the aircraft from being pulled towards the left. Despite the huge input that he had applied, his efforts were in vain as the aircraft kept moving to the left. In addition, the airspeed was constantly decreasing, creeping towards the aircraft's stall speed.

The crew didn't understand the reason for the aircraft's unusual behaviour. They noticed that their attempted feathering of the left engine earlier had failed and decided to try another attempt of engine feathering, but it failed again. In his effort to stabilize the flight, Captain Janjua added more thrust to the right engine several times, but his actions somehow aggravated the situation as it worsened the condition.

=== First plunge and initial recovery ===
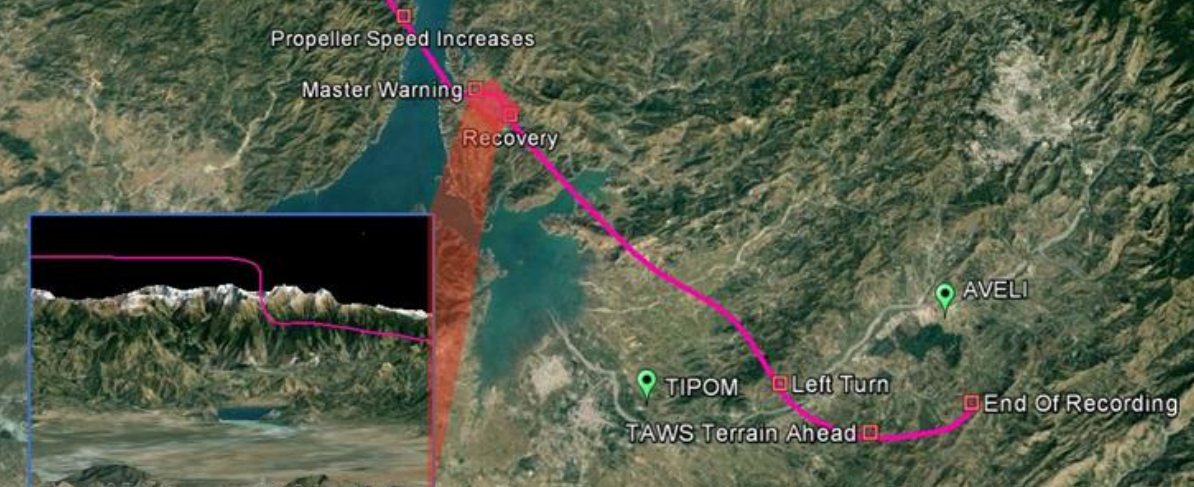
Illustration of the flight profile during the accident

The faulty engine suddenly fixed itself as the speed of the left propeller dropped from over 120% to just around 25% in seconds. In an instant, the massive drag force on the left side of the aircraft vanished. As Captain Janjua made excessive right turn inputs on the control column, the aircraft immediately banked to the right at a large angle, taking the crew by surprise. The aircraft flipped over, barrel-rolled, and then plunged for 5,100 feet (1,554 m) with the right wing perpendicular to the ground. This lasted a total of 24 seconds. Panicking, the crew repeatedly tried to save the aircraft from rolling by deflecting the aileron to the left. They eventually managed to regain control and level the wings.

The crew was clearly traumatized by the incident as they could be heard hyperventilating and their voices were trembling. First Officer Akram asked whether there was something wrong with the power. The other crew members were still confused about the exact cause of the aircraft's bizarre state. They were so terrified by the plunge that they couldn't have a structured discussion. Meanwhile, the speed of the left propeller had stabilized to under 5%. Despite this, a massive drag generated on the left side again as the blade pitch was in an angle that was close to a low pitch angle. The power lever was moved forward, but the airspeed kept decaying.

The state of the aircraft's performance had largely degraded. It was impossible for the crew to reach Islamabad unless they put the aircraft into a gradual descent, even though they were flying over a mountainous area. The crew reluctantly descended the aircraft to preserve the remaining airspeed, which was continuously decreasing. As they became closer to the ground, the crew tried to decrease the rate of descent, but as a result, this increased the depletion rate of the airspeed.

The trainee first officer at the back, fearing another plunge, repeatedly advised the crew not to put the aircraft into a bank. He requested that the captain maintains an altitude of 5,200 feet (1,585 m). Captain Janjua attempted to comply, but had to reduce the rate of descent, causing the airspeed to decrease and trigger the stick shaker. The crew then alerted the controller in Islamabad and declared multiple Mayday calls requesting priority landing.

Seeing the oncoming mountain, Captain Janjua desperately tried to turn the aircraft to the right. He was successful as the aircraft gradually turned, but the airspeed continued to deplete, causing stall warnings to blare inside the cockpit. Immediately afterwards, the aircraft started to turn to the left again. Their airspeed was at 156 knots (289 km/h; 180 mph) and their altitude was at 5,280 feet (1,609 m), with merely hundreds of feet being left from the ground.

=== Final plunge ===
Captain Janjua tried to stop the aircraft from turning to the left with great effort as the large drag on the left side had forced the crew to make large right input on the controls. The turn, however, became more uncontrollable and the airspeed continued to drop. The aircraft continued to lose its altitude and became nearer to the mountainous terrain. Captain Janjua tried hard to level the wings and to avoid the mountains by making excessive right turn input and modulating the thrust on the right engine, but he didn't realize that by that time it was not possible anymore for the aircraft to fly over the mountains. The TAWS warned the crew on the impending collision with terrain, while the crew desperately tried to save the aircraft from the mountains by holding the altitude. In doing so, the airspeed continued to decay further.

The aircraft finally reached a dangerously low speed and the stall warning sounded again inside the cockpit. At 850 feet (259 m) above ground, the left wing completely stalled and the aircraft banked 90 degrees to the left, nosediving into the mountain. It slammed onto terrain at a speed of 138 knots (256 km/h; 159 mph) and disintegrated. The aircraft crashed at about 16:15, leaving wreckage ablaze on the side of a hill between the villages of Saddha Batolni and Gug, near the Pakistan Ordnance Factory in Havelian in Khyber Pakhtunkhwa province about 90 kilometres (56 mi; 49 nmi) from the airport. The wreckage was reported to be strewn over an area about 2 kilometres (1.2 mi) across.

All 47 passengers and crew members were killed in the crash. This was the seventh aircraft accident resulting in hull loss sustained by PIA since 2000. Of the previous six, one resulted in fatalities; that of Pakistan International Airlines Flight 688 in 2006, in which 45 people died.

Coincidentally, the crash happened on International Civil Aviation Day.

=== Rescue operation ===
According to an eyewitness, Mohammad Haroon, the aircraft flew at a very low altitude and made a high-pitched noise, flying in an erratic, up-and-down mode before crashing into the hillside. "There was a huge bang after the plane hit the mountainside and caught fire". Announcements were broadcast by local mosques to mobilise villagers, who rushed to the site to look for survivors but were unable to get close due to the heat of the fire. Pakistan Army personnel and helicopters were also sent to the area for search and rescue operations. Ambulances could not reach the crash site due to absence of road access. Rescuers had to carry the bodies down to the assembly point below. The remains were taken by air to forensic laboratories in Islamabad and Rawalpindi for DNA testing to aid identification.

On the evening of 8 December, the rescue operation was ended by officials as rescuers managed to recover all 47 victims from the crash site.

== Response ==
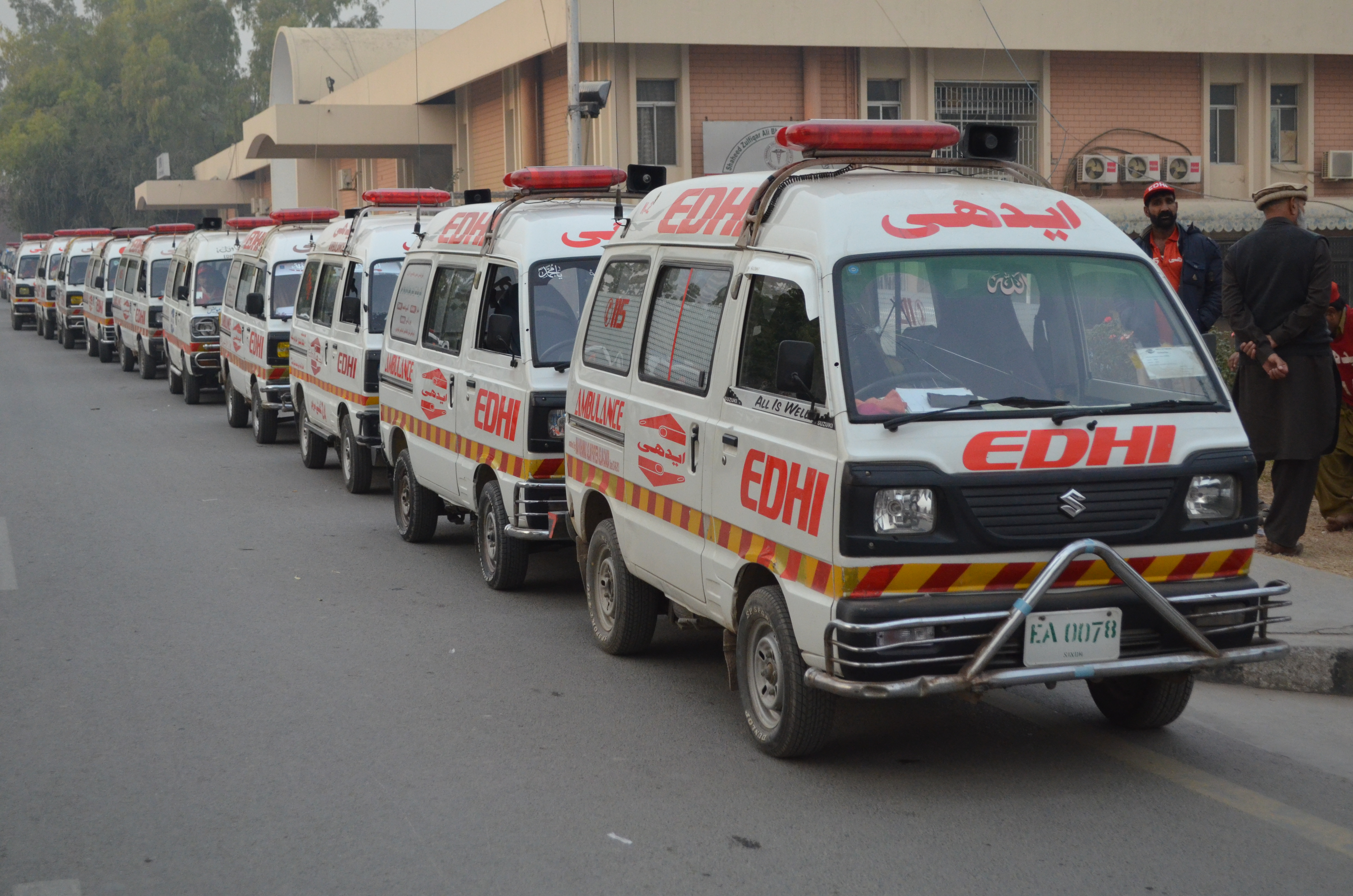
Ambulances were put on standby in response to the crash

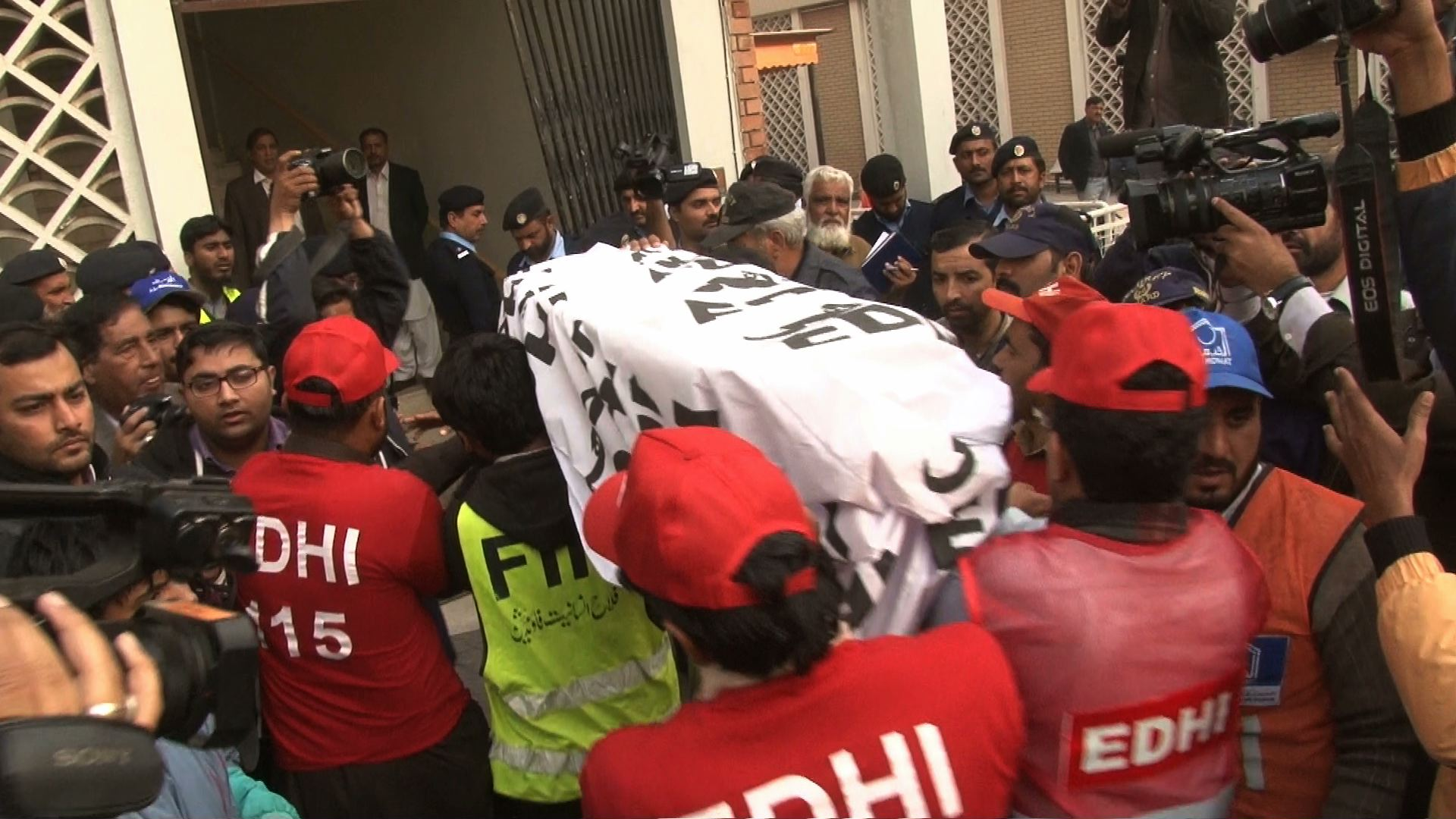
Evacuation of the victims to Islamabad

Prime Minister of Pakistan Nawaz Sharif immediately offered his condolences to the families of the victims. During his address to the parliament, he ordered an inquiry to be made immediately under the CAA's Safety Investigation Board (SIB), vowing to "bring out the truth". He directed PIA officials to reach out to the families of the victims and to provide the necessary assistance for them. In the immediate aftermath, workers from PIA and CAA set up helpdesks and a hotline in Islamabad's Benazir Bhutto International Airport for relatives of the victims. Members of the media were reportedly barred from entering the airport. PIA management stated that attempts were being made to reserve 40 hotel rooms to accommodate grieving families who were waiting for the body identification process.

Group Captain Naeem Ashraf Mirza was tasked to carry out the investigation of this crash. He was very efficient and completed the investigation and presented accurate results. PIA announced that compensations of 500,000 rupees would be provided to the victims families. Officials stated that PIA managers of each district were asked to personally visit the houses of the next of kin. Government official stated that a total of 5.5 million rupees would be distributed to the relatives.

In Chitral, where 20 of the passengers were residents of the town, town officials declared three days of mourning. Quran recitations were held across every mosque in Chitral. All public institutions, including schools, government offices and markets were closed in response to the crash. Funerals in absentia were held for Chitral's popular district commissioner Osama Warraich and for other victims. Residents of Chitral were also shocked by the death of members of Chitral traditional royal family. Shortly after the crash, flights from Chitral were suspended. Flights were resumed on 10 December. Protests were reported in Chitral as protesters urged PIA chairman to step down in response to the crash and asked authorities to conduct judicial inquiry into the crash. A judicial inquiry was eventually filed by public following indications of company misconduct.

Prior to the commencement of the final match of the 2016 - 2017 Quaid-e-Azam Trophy, a moment of silence for the victims was observed in Karachi's National Stadium.

Following an incident involving an ATR 72 at Multan Airport on 11 December, the PCAA ordered all ATR aircraft belonging to PIA to be grounded for inspection. Five ATR 42 and five ATR 72 aircraft were affected by the order. Flights that were using the ATR would be suspended. There were talks between PIA officials and Pakistani Air Force to temporarily replace the ATR with PAF Hercules C-130 aircraft.

The death of Junaid Jamshed and his second wife Nahya caused shock among Pakistani figures and public. On 12 December, his body was successfully identified. His body was flown to Karachi, where he was laid to rest on 15 December. Thousands of people attended his funeral, which was provided with tight security. Senior armed officers, politicians and Pakistani celebrities were among the attendees. Meanwhile, his wife, Nayha, was buried in Lahore.

On 16 December, Minister of State for Capital Administration Tariq Fazal Chaudhry announced that all 47 victims had been successfully identified.

=== Criticism of PIA ===
Following the crash, PIA received criticism of its practices and accusations that it did not investigate aircraft defects thoroughly enough. The mother of the ATR 42's first officer reported that he frequently mentioned to her that PIA's aircraft "are not fit to fly, and they should not be allowed to operate on dangerous routes". Civil society organizations stated that the crash was caused by mismanagement and corruption within PIA. There were calls for the inquiry to be made public. In Chowk, people demanded an increase of the amount of compensations for the relatives of the victims to Rs10 million.

Two days after the crash, another PIA pilot reportedly refused to fly an aircraft with a faulty engine. This was after several reports that PIA had a history of neglecting problems and of operating poorly overall as an airline. PIA responded that "it defies common sense that pilots and engineers would fly an aircraft that does not meet safety standards and risk their own lives."

The chairman of PIA, Azam Saigol, resigned six days after the crash citing personal reasons, though there were reports of him being pressured to resign. He was replaced by Irfan Elahi, previously a secretary for Pakistan Civil Aviation.

A year after the crash, PIA, along with the Pakistani government, faced new accusations regarding the release of the probe and the payment of the compensations. One of the family members reported that PIA had forced the next of kin to sign a declaration which stated that they would not take legal action against PIA if they had received compensations from the airline. Approximately 20 families had not received the supposed compensations from PIA.

== Investigation ==
The crash was investigated by members of Safety Investigation Board (later changed into the Aircraft Accident Investigation Board). According to Pakistani newspaper The Express Tribune, the crash of Flight 661 was the first ever crash investigation that would be conducted by an independent Safety Investigation Board. According to the decision that had been taken by authorities, the SIB would be separated from the control of CAA, which was operating under the Ministry of Defence. Instead, the SIB would report directly to the Aviation Division.

Assistance would be provided by French BEA and ATR. The NTSB of the United States also had an active role in the investigation as the propellers were made by US-based Woodward Propellers. Subsequently, Canadian TSB was also involved in the investigation as the engines were manufactured by Pratt & Whitney Canada. On 12 December, the nine members of the investigation team, three representatives from ATR, three from Pratt & Whitney Canada, and three from Pakistan, visited the crash site for wreckage examination.

Investigators retrieved the aircraft's flight recorder soon after the crash and it was sent to France for decoding. An initial report into the accident by the Pakistan Civil Aviation Authority (PCAA) was said to have determined that the aircraft's left engine malfunctioned at an altitude of 13,375 feet (4,077 m). The pilot reported the engine failure at 16:12, which was followed by a rapid uncontrolled descent and the disappearance of the aircraft from ground radar a few minutes later. However, the radio communication continued with radar even after disappearance from the screen of the radar.

Early reports speculated that the failed engine exploded and compromised the airframe, leading to the crash, but they have not been substantiated. Manager of Chitral Airport stated that no fault was found inside the aircraft as it had been completely checked by ground workers. Chairman of PIA also claimed that the aircraft was "technically sound", while PIA spokesperson Danyal Gilani further accused the media of "baseless accusation", stating that "it defies common sense that pilots will fly aircraft with defects". Analysis of the flight recorder data continued through January 2017, with the reason why the aircraft was not able to safely land on the functioning engine still unknown. A one-page preliminary report of the Safety Investigation Board found a 'lapse' on the part of the PIA and a 'lack of oversight' by the PCAA.

=== Series of malfunctions ===
Despite claims from PIA chairman that the aircraft was airworthy and had been checked properly by their employees, the findings from the investigation revealed that the aircraft in fact had three pre-existing technical problems; a fractured turbine blade of the left engine, a fractured pin inside the flyweights of the overspeed governor (OSG) of the left engine, and debris inside the overspeed line of the propeller valve module (PVM). All three defects had directly contributed to the aircraft's unusual behaviour during the accident.

One of the blades inside the turbine had fractured at some point before 7 December flight. During the flight, the fractured blade generated vibration that travelled through the turbine shaft. The vibration enabled physical contact (rub) between components, one of which was the No. 6 seal bearing. Contact between the turbine shaft and the bearing inflicted damage to the bearing, causing some metal flakes from the bearing to get in to the oil system of the engine. The engine finally degraded but it had not failed yet as the turbine was still able to produce power.

If the engine failed to work properly, instead of being turned by engines, the propellers would be hit by the oncoming airflow from the front. When it occurred, the blade pitch would decrease. Simultaneously with the decrease in blade pitch angle, the propeller speed would increase as the decrease of the propeller angle would cause the propeller to catch the wind more easily. If the propellers managed to get rotated by the airflow, these would endanger the flight as it would generate drag, causing the airspeed to decrease. The phenomenon is known as windmilling. To prevent the blade pitch from reaching low angle and the propeller speed to go beyond the overspeed value, the aircraft was equipped with a device called the overspeed governor (OSG).

External videos
- Overspeed governor (OSG)
- Animation on how the OSG works on YouTube

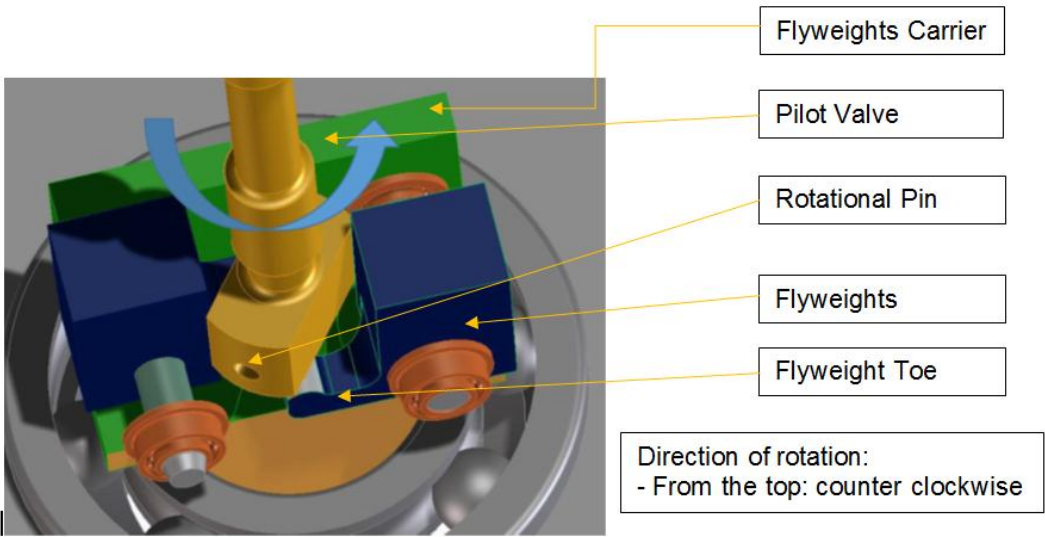
The OSG is included with flyweights and plunger. To open the OSG valve, the flyweights‘ "toes" will push the plunger upwards.

The protection system of the overspeed governor will activate when the overspeed valve is opened. To open the overspeed valve, the aircraft is equipped with flyweights. In the case of an engine failure, these flyweights will open the valve by pushing a plunger upwards. The plunger sits directly above the flyweights and usually rotates in tandem with the propeller, along with the flyweights and the rotating part of the overspeed governor. To rotate simultaneously in a safe manner, the plunger is equipped with rotational pin to connect it with the flyweights and the rotating part of the overspeed governor.

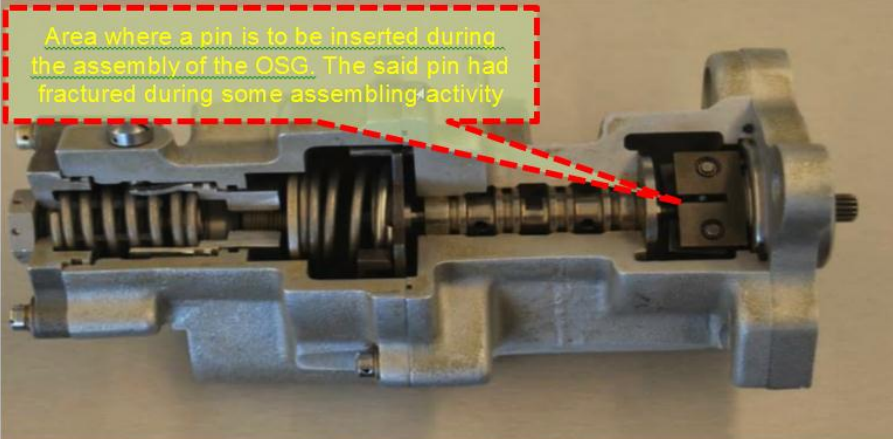
Cross-sectional view of the OSG

The pin inside the involved ATR-42 had broken off prior to Flight 661. Due to the broken pin, the plunger lost its connection with the propeller. The flyweights, however, were still able to rotate in tandem with the propeller. As a result, the corners of the plunger got caught with the flyweights. This put metal fatigue to the flyweights, one of which had broken off before the flight due to excessive stress. In Flight 661, the fractured blade caused metal flakes to enter the overspeed line, collecting itself near the overspeed valve. This put more stress to the flyweights as it hardened the rotation of the plunger. The excessive load pulled the flyweights upwards by a little, causing it to push the plunger upward by a bit, partially opening the OSG valve. The partial opening managed to decrease the propeller speed. At this point, the engine had not failed yet.

The Propeller Electrical Control (PEC) sensed an anomaly on the propeller's speed and tried to change the blade pitch to increase the propeller speed. It failed to do so as the blade pitch was already controlled by the OSG, not the PEC. The PEC then sent messages regarding the failure to the crew. Meanwhile, the OSG valve became closed again as the last remaining flyweights began to break due to fatigue, causing the blade pitch to decrease and the propeller speed to accelerate. The sudden change in propeller speed generated sound that was loud enough for the crew to notice. As the flyweights were faced with an enormous resistance from the hardened rotation for another time, the flyweights were pulled up again, causing the plunger to go up as well and opening the OSG valve. The propeller speed started to decrease again. Minutes later, the torque of the left engine dropped to 0% in seconds and the captain declared that the left engine had failed. To prevent the propeller from windmilling, the crew had to feather the propeller. The crew then initiated the propeller feathering procedure, which involved the feather solenoid and the protection valve.

In principle, the activation of the feather solenoid will provide protection on the feathering process, ensuring that the propellers will always be feathered and thus preserving the airspeed. To activate the protection system, the feather solenoid will retrieve oil from the opening of the protection valve. The valve has two modes; unprotected mode and protected mode. In the protected mode, the valve will open and oil from the overspeed line will pour in. As a result, the calculated pressure inside the OSG line will decrease, while a nearby chamber will record an increase in pressure. This difference in pressure will force the blade pitch to increase, thus reducing the speed of the propeller. In Flight 661, the line that connected the feather solenoid with the oil had been contaminated with debris of unknown origin. When the oil travelled through the line, it picked up the debris and caused it to clump together at a bottleneck. This restricted the oil flow to the feather solenoid, causing the protection valve to switch from the protected mode to the unprotected mode. Therefore, the propeller was not able to be feathered.

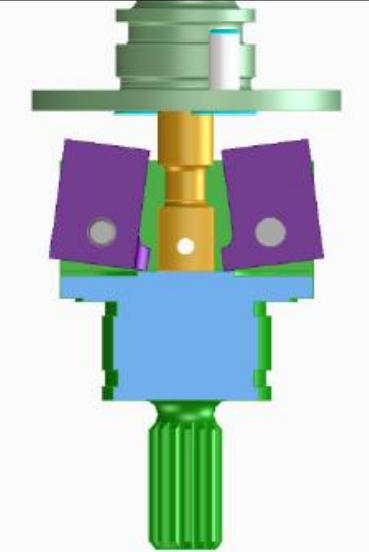
In this figure, the plunger had pushed through the flyweights and didn't rest on top of the flyweights anymore. As a result, the plunger could not be pushed upwards and the OSG valve remained in closed position.

Back in the OSG, the flyweights had failed as the plunger had pushed through them. As it was not positioned at the top of the flyweights, the plunger could not be pushed by the flyweights anymore and as a result the OSG valve was closed and could never be opened again, enabling the blade pitch to go beyond the lowest allowable angle and the propeller speed to accelerate. As all of the propeller feathering system had been compromised, the propeller could not be feathered properly and the airspeed continued to deplete. The unfeathered propeller on the left engine generated massive amount of drag. Additionally, the thrust was not symmetrical and thus the aircraft was pulled to the left.

While the left propeller was windmilling, the propeller also rotated the turbine of the left engine to the same direction. As the blade pitch became nearer to zero, the engine managed to absorb the forces that rotated the propeller, causing the propeller speed to decrease gradually. The force of the hitting airflow eventually could not withstand the friction forces of the engine's turbine and the propeller suddenly stopped in its track. The sudden drop in propeller speed caught the crew by surprise, which caused the aircraft to barrel roll due to the excessive input that had been made by the crew.

After the first plunge, the propeller speed managed to stabilize to a value below 5%. Despite this, the blade pitch had reached a value below zero, known as reverse angle. Such blade angle would have been prevented by the ATR-42 safety feature, the SLPS protection system. However, the system was overridden before by the contaminated overspeed line and thus it could not prevent the blade pitch from reaching low angle. The reverse angle, normally used for landing, generated massive drag with a value of around 2,000 pounds-force (8,900 N), seven times greater than the normal propeller drag in a single-engine operation. This further compromised the airspeed, causing it to continuously drop even though the lever of the right engine had been significantly advanced forward. By this point, it was impossible for the crew to maintain their altitude.

=== Cause of failures ===
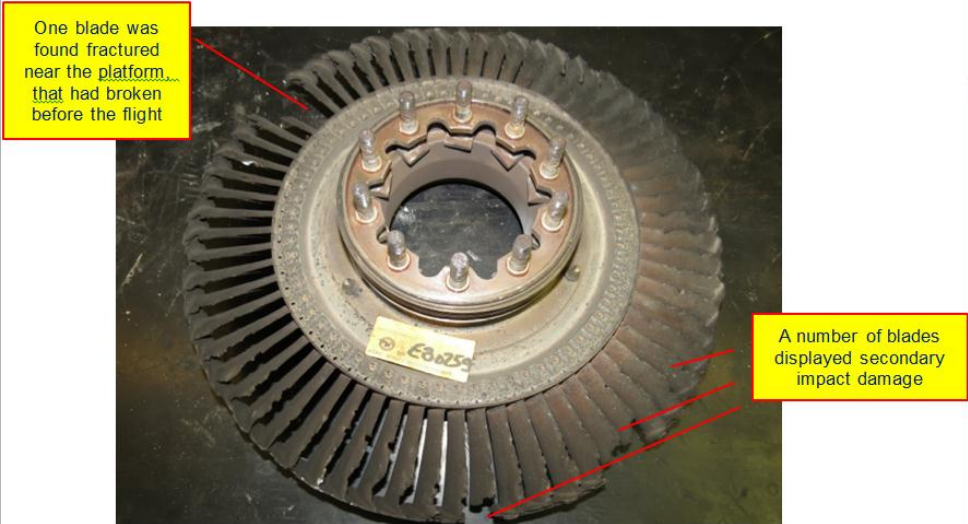
Signs of fractures on the left engine turbine

According to the manufacturer of the engine, Pratt and Whitney, there was a known problem with the blades of the PW127 engines. If the turbine had exceeded the 10,000 hours lifespan, there would be fractures on the blades. The problem had been reported since 2007, nearly 10 years before the crash. The company then issued a service bulletin in October 2015 for design renewal on the blades and the service bulletin was transmitted to every operator of the engine. The service bulletin stated that operator of the engine should replace the blades within the very first available opportunity to change it. Pakistan International Airlines confirmed that they knew about the service bulletin, but chose not to follow it.

Approximately 93 hours before the crash, the involved aircraft, AP-BHO, was brought into PIA maintenance facility for a repair. The engines were disassembled and the workers gained access to the turbine blades. According to the investigators, this was the very first opportunity for PIA to replace the turbine blades. The blades of the involved aircraft had accumulated a total of 10,004.1 hours, exceeding the threshold that had been set by the manufacturer, but PIA didn't replace them with the new blades. The aircraft was put back into service with the old blades. One of the blades eventually fractured, setting off the whole sequence of the crash.

While PIA was responsible for the maintenance of the engines, they were not permitted to conduct maintenance on the OSG of the aircraft, which included the flyweights and the plunger. Under PIA, the components were listed as repair abroad item, in which said components should be sent abroad for maintenance. The OSG had been maintained at least three times and the last maintenance was conducted in 2015. At the time of the accident, the flyweights and plunger were not functioning normally as the rotational pin of the plunger had snapped.

According to the manufacturer, Woodward Propellers, analysis regarding the aircraft's OSG components revealed that there was an improper assembly on the lower body of the OSG. According to the analysis, the components were forced to work altogether. The review further stated that the technique that was used during the improper assembly of the OSG had taken much more time and work than the normal technique. The maintenance hence was presumably done by someone who did not understand how to assemble the flyweights and the plunger, but did so anyway. The rotational pin of the plunger eventually snapped, damaging the flyweights.

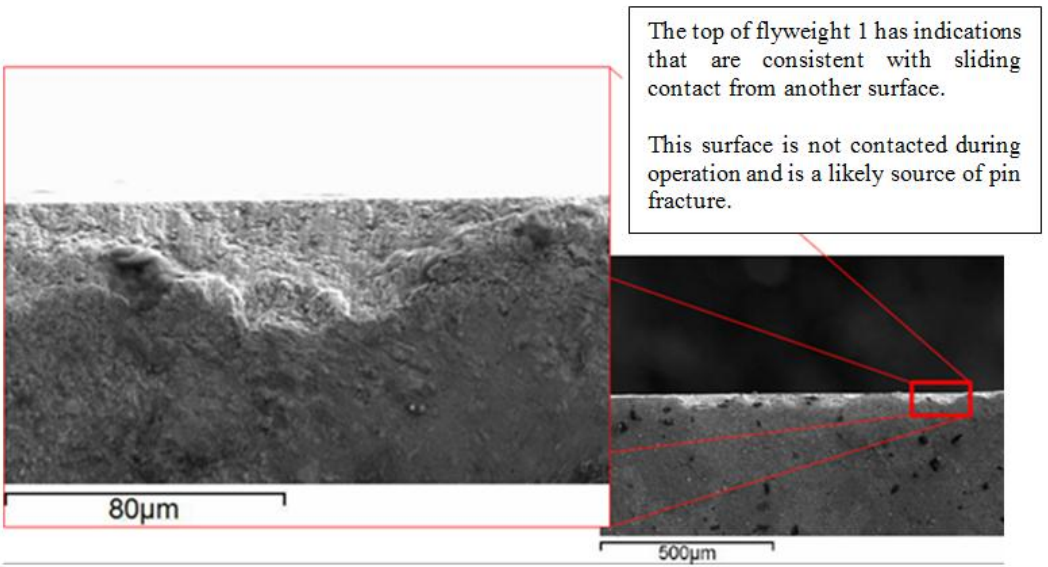
Suspected location of pin fracture inside the flyweights

Unfortunately, investigators could not determine when or where this unauthorized maintenance took place. The company stated that a set of tests had always been conducted on whether the produced components from the company were at an acceptable level. According to the review, this was the first time that the company had ever received a faulty OSG as records from 1994 showed that there were virtually no reported similar complaints. Investigators concluded that it was unlikely, though not impossible, that the maintenance had been conducted by an untrained technician from Woodward Propellers.

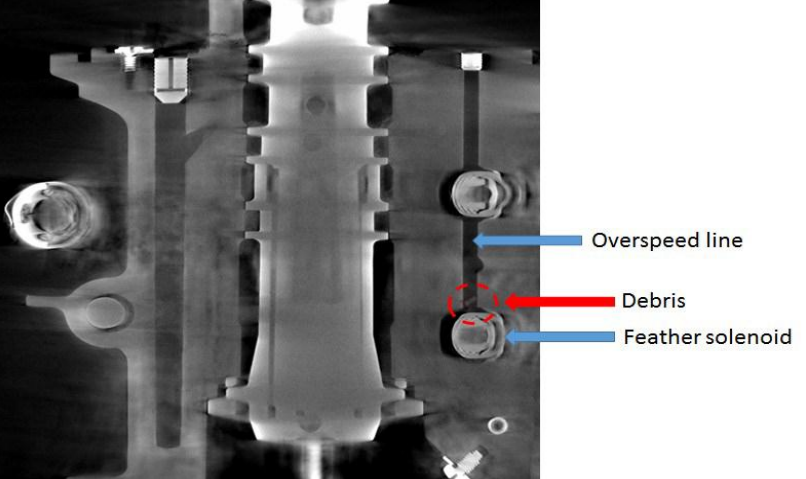
CT-Scan of the involved PVM, showing debris inside the overspeed line

The debris inside the overspeed line was big enough that it could neither go through the filters nor a narrowing area inside the line. It was concluded that the debris had not originated from the metal flakes that had been produced by the failing engine. According to investigators, the debris was likely introduced into the overspeed line when the propeller LRU was installed on the gearbox. However, investigators could not determine when or where such maintenance took place.

=== Oversight ===
As the findings indicated that there were errors during maintenance of the aircraft, further investigation was needed regarding the role of structural factors into the crash.

The aircraft was maintained by PIA in the airline's Maintenance Repair and Overhaul (MRO) facility in Karachi. The report described the PIA maintenance facility as one of the pioneers in the region to achieve high-level certification, including from the European Union Aviation Safety Agency (EASA). PIA's MRO facility in Karachi's Jinnah International Airport had even provided services for countries in the Middle East, Central Asia, Far East and Southeast Asia. Operational review from investigators revealed that some improvements were required in several fields, including the assembly and disassembly of engines, bearing inspection and material handling. However, as further analysis regarding the airworthiness of PIA's fleet was needed, a review from Pratt and Whitney was requested to compare the reliability of the ATR fleet/PW127 engines that had been operated under PIA. The result showed that PIA's ATR/PW127 engines had very low reliability compared to the other ATR fleet worldwide. Even when investigators compared PIA with other airliners in near similar operating environment, the reliability of PIA's ATR/PW127 engines were still considerably lower.

The logbook from 2008 to 2016 showed that there were several cases of inflight engine shutdown. Despite this, no proactive measures and further analysis had been taken by PIA or CAA. Investigators also noted that there were deviations from the procedure that had been issued by Pratt and Whitney. Such deviations were documented or registered by CAA Airworthiness system.

Another problem regarding the issuance of dubious pilots’ licenses began to appear as well. Irregularities on physical pilot attendance during licensing exams and recorded number of participants during a specific period of time gave rise to the suspicion. The names of Captain Janjua and First Officer Akram initially were among the list of pilots who were suspected of having such dubious licenses, but the issue eventually became irrelevant to the cause of the crash as the AAIB concluded that the actions of the crew during the flight had been commensurate with their respective training and experience. The finding, however, was still concerning.

Added with the fact that PIA had purposely not complied with the service bulletin that had been issued by the manufacturer, Pakistan's CAA, which was responsible for the oversight of the nation's aviation safety, was questioned on their oversight. The annual audits of PIA from 2014 to 2018 revealed that there were gaps and loopholes in the monitoring and evaluation of aircraft airworthiness and safety spectrum and CAA was unable to identify the issues. The CAA was described by investigators as being unable to demonstrate proportionate conclusions, identify the trends and undertake proactive interventions. The report concluded that the oversight mechanism that had been established by PIA and CAA was inadequate or ineffective to identify weak areas within the system's scope.

=== Conclusion ===
The AAIB released the final report on 18 November 2020. The cause of the accident was a fracture of a turbine blade in the number one (left side) turboprop engine as a result of improper maintenance. This led to the initial engine failure. A fractured pin in the overspeed governor allowed the propeller to reach rotational speeds in excess of 120%. The highly variable propeller speeds resulted in rapidly changing aerodynamic characteristics. The propeller eventually settled into a very high-drag configuration. The ATR-42's behaviour was different from the 'typical' loss of a single engine and level flight became impossible. The report notes, "It was exceptionally difficult for the pilots to understand the situation and hence possibly control the aircraft." It was also noted that crew resource management was ineffective, but did not contribute to the accident.

The AAIB issued several recommendations to the involved parties. The first part was consisted of two urgent recommendations, which were issued during the progress of the investigation. The first recommendation was issued in January 2019, in which PIA was asked to inspect their entire ATR fleet to change the blades that had met the criteria for replacement. The second recommendation was issued in August 2019, following request by the NTSB and Collins Aerospace. The recommendation stated that PIA should inspect all of the OSGs inside their ATR fleet and the OSGs should be sent to United States after said inspection, following discovery of an improper assembly.

The second part of the recommendations were given after the completion of the investigation. Among those, PIA was asked to ensure strict compliance with the issued service bulletin, to conduct improvements on weak areas in its MRO facility and to identify critical performance indicators within its airworthiness and flight safety operation. The cockpit resource management training system of PIA and the country was asked to be revamped. Improvements were also ordered for CAA relating to its oversight system.

According to the final report, the manufacturer of the aircraft, ATR, were to consider including a specific procedure in the future aircraft training programme, in case of possible similar aerodynamic features to that encountered by the crew of Flight 661. FAA and Collins Aerospace stated that they were considering a system review and also a possible improvements of the filtration inside the oil system to prevent it from being clogged by unwanted debris.

== Aftermath ==
The crash was the starting point for the creation of an independent aircraft accident investigation body in Pakistan. Following multiple complaints from family members of the victims regarding the delayed release of the result of the probe, the government of Pakistan created a new bill. Under the government of Imran Khan, the government issued the 2019 National Aviation Policy bill which included the creation of an independent aircraft accident investigation body that would be called the Aircraft Accident Investigation Board (AAIB). The body would be completely independent from other government institutions and would not be under the order of the Civil Aviation Authority (CAA) anymore. Instead of reporting the result of the investigation to the Ministry of Defence, which supervised the operation of the CAA, the AAIB would report the result straight to the aviation division of Pakistan.

== In popular culture ==
The intro on the song Mayday by the Japanese band Coldrain sampled the flight's mayday distress signal.

== See also ==
- Atlantic Southeast Airlines Flight 529
- Atlantic Southeast Airlines Flight 2311
