= Nawaz Bhatti =

Pakistani judge

Justice Muhammad Nawaz Bhatti (August 1948 – 10 July 2006) who hailed from Sangla Hill area of Sheikhupura district was a Pakistani judge and lawyer. He was a judge of Lahore High Court, and a well known criminal lawyer and law officer representing the governments of Punjab and Pakistan.

He was appointed as an Additional Advocate General Punjab in 1998–1999. Earlier, he also served as an Assistant Advocate General Punjab twice, in 1993 and 1997. He was appointed as Deputy Attorney General of Pakistan from 2000 to 2004, when he was sworn in as a judge of the Lahore High Court and posted to the LHC Multan bench on January 12, 2004.

He died in a plane crash near Multan Airport on 10 July 2006, while he was serving in Multan. The plane burst into flames shortly after takeoff after crashing into a wheat field three kilometres from the airport. His funeral was attended by hundreds including his fellow judges. He was buried in Sangla Hill. His son Amir Nawaz Bhatti is also a practicing lawyer and member of the Lahore High Court Bar Association, Lahore.
