= Ibrahim Town =

Locality in Multan, Pakistan

Ibrahim Town is a locality within the city of Multan in the province of Punjab in the Islamic Republic of Pakistan.

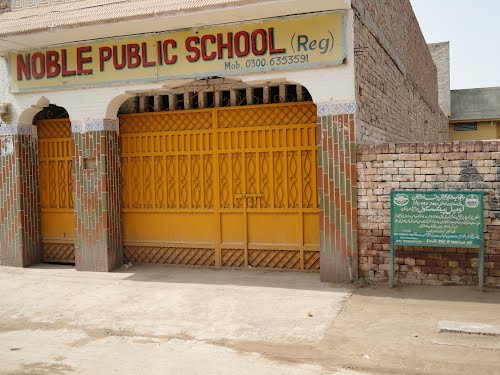
Nobel Public School

It is located maximum within a five-minute drive to Multan Cantt and seven minutes to Multan International Airport.

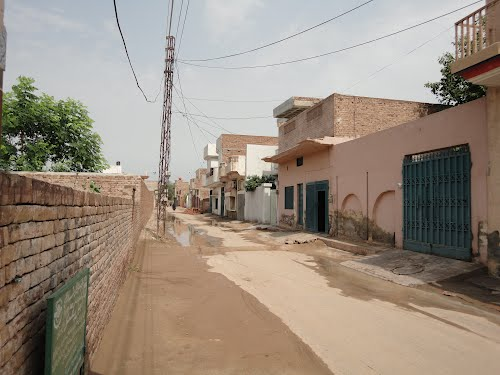
Ibrahim Town's main street after a rainy night

The locality includes a total of 200 plots and homes with approximately 1,500 people. The locality includes two mosques, one government school (Noble Public School provides free education to 1,000 children in the area), and a hospital.

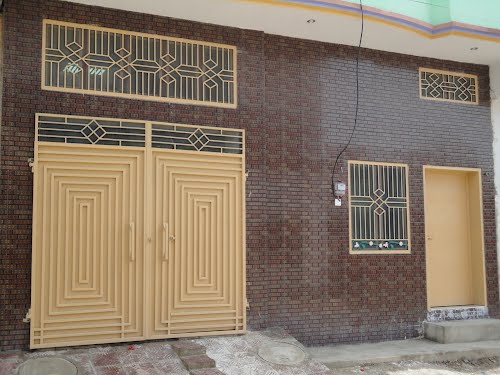
A house in Ibrahim Town; classic homes in Multan

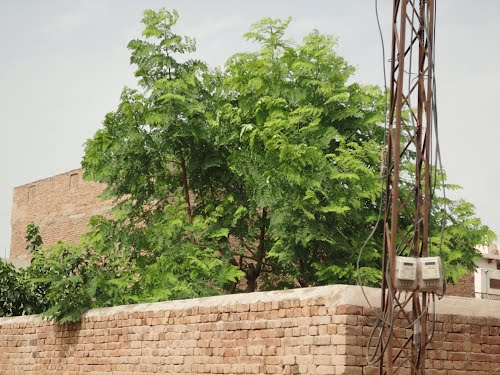
Greenery in Ibrahim Town

The locality is based on eight paved streets.
