= Pakistan International Airlines Flight 688 =

2006 aviation accident in Pakistan

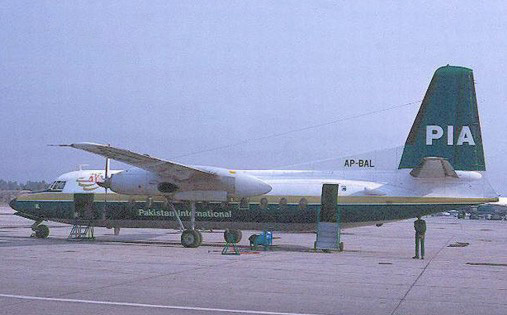
- AP-BAL, the aircraft involved in the accident

Accident
- Date: 10 July 2006
- Summary: Engine failure leading to pilot error and stall
- Site: Near Multan International Airport, Multan, Pakistan; 30°17′N 71°25′E

Aircraft
- Aircraft type: Fokker F27-200
- Operator: Pakistan International Airlines
- IATA flight No.: PK688
- ICAO flight No.: PIA688
- Call sign: PAKISTAN 688
- Registration: AP-BAL
- Flight origin: Multan International Airport, Multan, Pakistan
- Stopover: Allama Iqbal International Airport, Lahore, Pakistan
- Destination: Benazir Bhutto International Airport, Islamabad, Pakistan
- Occupants: 45
- Passengers: 41
- Crew: 4
- Fatalities: 45
- Survivors: 0

Pakistan International Airlines Flight 688 was a domestic passenger flight from Multan to Islamabad with a stopover in Lahore, operated by Pakistan's flag carrier Pakistan International Airlines. On 10 July 2006, the aircraft operating the route, a Fokker F27, crashed into a mango orchard after one of its two engines failed shortly after takeoff from Multan International Airport. All 41 passengers and four crew on board were killed.

Pakistan Civil Aviation Authority (PCAA) attributed the causes of the crash to multiple factors. One of the engines started to malfunction during the take-off roll due to improper assembly. Despite the aircraft being able to stop within the remaining runway distance, the pilots opted to continue their take-off. They failed to carry out the correct emergency procedure and as a result the airspeed rapidly decayed, ultimately stalling the aircraft.

== Aircraft ==
The aircraft was a Fokker F27 registered as AP-BAL with a serial number of 10243. The aircraft was manufactured in February 1964 and was delivered to Pakistan International Airlines in 1979. According to the logbook, the aircraft had a total flying hours of 73,591.

The engines were produced by Rolls-Royce. The left engine and the right engine were manufactured in 1959 and 1958, respectively. Both engines had been overhauled at the PIA Ispahani Hangar facility approximately one year prior to the crash.

== Passengers and crew ==
The aircraft was carrying 41 passengers. According to the manifest, 33 were men and 8 were women. All of them were thought to be Pakistanis. The passenger manifest showed that 20 passengers were heading to Lahore, while the other 21 were heading to Islamabad. Among the passengers were Lahore High Court (LHC) judge Justice Muhammad Nawaz Bhatti, former LHC judge Nazeer Siddiqui, Vice-Chancellor of Bahauddin Zakariya University Mohammed Naseer Khan, and two army brigadiers. Pakistan's The Express Tribune reported that there were seven doctors on board the aircraft. Imtiaz Anwar, an official from the airline who was responsible on the airworthiness of the Fokker fleet of PIA, was also on board.

The captain was 53-year-old Hamed Qureshi. He had a total flying experience of 9,320 hours. He graduated from Pakistan Air Force Academy in Risalpur and joined PIA in December 1989. The first officer was 28-year-old Abrar Chughtai. He had accumulated a total flying experience of 520 hours, Both cockpit crew members had less flying experience with the Fokker F27, just 138 hours for Captain Qureshi and 303 flight hours for First Officer Chughtai.

== Accident ==
Flight 688 was scheduled to take off from Multan at 12:00 p.m, with Pakistan's second largest city of Lahore as its destination. The Fokker F27 was carrying 41 passengers and 4 crew members. According to the report, the flight was to later continue to Islamabad. The weather was good when the aircraft was cleared to take off.

The aircraft was rolling on the runway at a speed of 60 - 70 knots when the crew noticed that one of the pumps had malfunctioned. After reaching approximately half of the runway, the aircraft started to veer to the right. The crew then tried to maintain the course of the aircraft and it managed to stay on the remaining runway distance. As it reached 90 knots, Captain Qureshi asked First Officer Chughtai on whether the torque on the right engine had decreased, to which First Officer Chughtai responded: "affirmative".

Five seconds later, the Fokker F27 crossed its V1 speed and the cockpit crew decided to continue the takeoff from Multan. At 120 knots, the aircraft lifted off from Multan Airport. The autofeather system then activated shortly after. The right engine suffered a flame out and began to spool down. The cockpit crew decided to manually feather the right engine. Meanwhile, the air traffic controller in Multan noticed that smoke was emanating from the right engine. They then informed Captain Qureshi on the situation and the captain tried to return to Multan. The fire alarm blared inside the cockpit.

Flight 688 began to bank several times with its landing gears extended. The aircraft reached a maximum height of 150 – 160 ft. It then stalled and banked heavily, plunging onto a nearby mango garden. Several farmers on the ground panicked as they saw the aircraft hurtling towards them. The aircraft then hit some trees and smashed into a mud wall before skidding on the ground. The nose caught a ditch, causing the rest of the aircraft to flip and eventually landed on its back. During the front roll, the tail detached and struck a nearby electric wire. It came to rest in an inverted position. The fuels on board the aircraft then ignited, creating an intense blaze.

Two minutes after takeoff, Flight 688 ceased all contact with the control tower in Multan. The aircraft crashed into a mango garden, approximately 1.2 nautical miles northeast of Multan International Airport. Local residents reported that "faint screams" from the survivors could be heard in the immediate aftermath and they immediately rushed to the scene and attempted to rescue them. However, the intense fire that had been created by the fuel on board prevented the locals to go near the wreckage. One of the flight attendants was pulled out alive, but later died on the way to the hospital. Fire brigades managed to reach the site within five to six minutes after the crash, but by that time most of the wreckage had been completely burnt. All 45 passengers and crew members were killed in the crash.

== Response ==
Incumbent President of Pakistan General Pervez Musharraf expressed his grief over the deaths of the passengers and crews. High ranking government officials also sent their condolences to the relatives of the victims. Chief Minister of Punjab, Chaudhry Pervaiz Elahi, ordered Punjab Minister Rana Muhammad Qasim Noon to visit the crash site. Pakistan Ministry of Defence stated that the government would establish a helpline in the ministry, as well as in Pakistani CAA and PIA offices in Islamabad, Lahore and Multan. Pakistan Prime Minister Shaukat Aziz ordered then-Minister of Defence Rao Sikandar Iqbal to open an inquiry into the crash.

In the aftermath of the crash, several events were cancelled in Lahore to respect the victims. Traders reportedly closed their shops and mass prayer was held in a public park on the evening of the crash. Lahore High Court was closed following the deaths of the two judges. Chief Justice of Pakistan Iftikhar Muhammad Chaudhry later visited the relatives of one of the judges. Meanwhile, the Multan Bar Association announced three day of national mourning. The Punjab Bar Council also announced a day of national mourning on 11 July.

Spokesman from PIA stated that victims' next of kin would be given compensation of up to Rs500,000.

The Air League of PIA Employees Union charged the PIA administration with responsibility for the crash. They argued that the airline operated flights with too few crew members, promoted incompetent officials, and carried out substandard overhaul work on aircraft, among other flaws. Academic Staff Association of Bahauddin Zakariya University also criticized PIA officials for the crash, demanding then-PIA chairman Tariq Kirmani to resign. They also expressed their dismay to officials from Pakistani CAA and the government regarding the safety of the Fokker F27 fleet.

Employees in PIA accused the airline of being short on maintenance workers. According to the report, approximately 30 senior engineers had left the airline since January 2006. Most of them applied to Gulf-based airlines.

Following negative sentiments from the public, Pakistani government ordered PIA to ground their Fokker fleet. Information Minister Muhammad Ali Durani stated that routes in the North of the country would be replaced with C-130 Hercules and other routes would be deliberated among officials for more consideration. The routes were later replaced with Boeing. All PIA Fokker aircraft were later withdrawn from service and replaced with ATR aircraft. Starting in November 2006, the Fokker F27 fleet would be replaced with seven ATR-42. In response to the grounding of the Fokker F27 fleet, fares of the routes were reportedly raised by PIA.

== Investigation ==
Director General of Pakistan Civil Aviation Authority announced the formation of a board of inquiry to probe the cause of the crash, headed by Air Commodore Junaid Amin. Special investigation team assembled by PIA announced that they would compile a report within a week of the accident. The investigation would take up to three months for completion. Pakistani authorities had asked assistance from multiple foreign experts, including those from Fokker, Rolls-Royce and other air crash investigation agencies. The Pakistan Airline Pilot's Association, however, criticized the move as a "farce and an eyewash" as they accused authorities, particularly PIA, of being hesitant on involving International Federation of Air Line Pilots' Associations into the probe. They later claimed that the move was a biased attempt to put the blame on the pilots.

The flight recorders were recovered from the crash site and were taken to Karachi for examination. The flight data recorder was later flown to the U.S and the cockpit voice recorder was sent to France and the United Kingdom for readout.

There were concerns regarding the condition of PIA's Fokker F27 fleet. One of the relatives of the victims of the crash had told PIA authorities to ground the Fokker F27 following a flight from Islamabad to Multan. Both cockpit crew reportedly had also filed complaint in regards to the maintenance and the airworthiness of the Fokker F27 fleet. PIA, however, reiterated that their Fokker fleet was airworthy and certified for flying. Deputy Managing Director of PIA, Farooq Shah, stated that there were no known recorded defects on the involved aircraft in the last 15 days. Pakistani CAA also claimed that the Fokker F27 fleet was airworthy.

=== Engine malfunction ===
Investigators visited the crash site on the same day of the crash. Following report from air traffic control that the aircraft had caught fire during the take-off, the runway was inspected for possible clues. The team discovered a metal debris lying on the right side of the runway at a distance of 4,000 ft down the runway. The grass surrounding the area had signs of fire. While continuing through the entire length of the runway, they discovered that more pieces of metal debris had spread until at a distance of 6,800 ft.

The identification of the metal debris revealed that the pieces were actually parts of the aircraft's turbine blades, specifically from the right engine. A teardown on the right engine further revealed that the two bolts which retained the bearing of the rear turbine had cracked due to stress. A third bolt had also fractured in the same way. The stress had originated from the inner part of the ball bearing, which eventually led to metal fatigue. The inner portion had been too extensively damaged that investigators could not determine the primary source of the failure, but it was thought that the failure had occurred prior to the flight on 10 July.

Further examination showed that the clamping load on the bearing assembly had lost. Subsequently, the bearing assembly moved from its place and the turbine followed the movement of the ball bearing. This resulted in a physical contact (rub) between the rear part of the high pressure turbine (HPT) blades and intermediate pressure turbine (IPT). Due to the rub, the root neck part of the blades overheated and the blades eventually broke off in high temperature. The IPT turbines also contacted the low pressure turbine (LPT), causing fatigue as well. The resulting separation of the blades caused deterioration in the engine performance. These blades were also noted as the ones that caused the fuel to ignite during the crash.

The bolts which held the bearing in its place had cracked due to bending stress. The stress was caused by improper assembly, which happened during the last overhaul of the engine at a local PIA facility in September 2005. According to investigators, the thrust bearing had "some eccentricity" during the assembly and as a result it went into an orbit instead of an ideal rotation. The motion produced reverse bending load on the bolt heads of the bearing assembly. One of the bolts eventually failed and created a domino effect with the other 5 bolts, causing the bearing cover to open. The clamping load of the bolts had completely diminished. The loss of clamping load that had been caused by the cracked bolt made the blades move.

=== Conduct of emergency ===
Fokker, a participant of the investigation, explained that the Fokker F27 was capable of carrying out a safe single engine operation from any phase of flight. Flight 688 however crashed within 5 minutes after take-off from Multan, raising questions on possible error in other areas.

The engine failure started while the aircraft was rolling on the runway at a distance of 4,000 ft. The right engine suffered partial power loss following the separation of the turbine blades, causing the torque to decrease. As a result of the failure, a thrust asymmetry occurred, causing the aircraft to drift towards the right during the roll. The crew successfully controlled the aircraft as it managed to stay on the runway throughout the rest of the roll. At this point, the aircraft had not reached its V1 speed and the remaining runway distance was still suitable for a rejected take off. Contrary to the supposed procedure, the crew decided to continue their take-off roll. The aircraft eventually took off from Multan, albeit using too much runway length due to the engine malfunction.

Immediately after take-off, the flight system autofeathered the right engine. The crew decided to manually feather the right engine, even though they had not reached 400 ft above ground. The landing gears were also not retracted, further compromising the aerodynamic capability of the aircraft. Following reports of engine fire and activation of the fire alarm, the captain decided to return to Multan. During his attempt to return, the crew didn't pay much attention to the direction of the runway and caused the aircraft to overbank, reaching 30 degree of bank angle at one point. The multiple overbanking of the aircraft caused the airspeed to deplete even further.

As the airspeed continued to drop, the aircraft stopped climbing. It reached a maximum height of 150 – 160 ft before it started to descend rapidly. The bank angle increased greatly to 115 degree and the crew had completely stalled the aircraft.

The actions of the cockpit crews were regarded as lacking in professionalism, displaying poor airmanship and extremely poor emergency handling.

=== Failure of PIA ===
The findings subsequently revealed numerous failures from PIA, including the oversight of its fleet, the quality control, the maintenance procedure, and the training of the flight crew. PIA was also criticized for the poor scheduling of the cockpit crew. Both cockpit crew members had only accumulated an insufficiently low amount of flying experience on the Fokker F27. With both cockpit crews' little experience on the flight system, error could easily occur during the emergency handling.

The inability of the pilots to conduct a proper emergency handling, according to investigators, were indications of inadequate training and pilot assessment from PIA. There were instances of multiple maintenance violations, where aircraft repairs were not conducted in conformance with the correct procedures. These were corroborated by findings from Dowty Propellers, Rolls-Royce and Fokker, who also pointed out multiple maintenance errors including the improper assembly of the right main engine bearing. The feathering motor had also been maintained in poor condition, with the bearing had been improperly fitted and the motor had been worn out. The maintenance of the motor had been carried out with penning, which was described by investigators as "maintenance malpractice".

Investigators also noted the lack of quality control within PIA. This was proved by the oil samples that had been collected by investigators, where it contained deposits from other aircraft parts which indicated problems with the aircraft's bearing in the area. PIA failed to monitor the quality of the oil through a locally introduced procedure of spectrometric oil analysis program (SOAP).

PIA's oversight regarding the airworthiness was also scrutinized. The aircraft had been overhauled with the wrong assembly of the bearing. Even with the improper assembly, PIA engineers somehow allowed the aircraft to fly.

=== Lack of oversight ===
Although the aircraft had been certified as airworthy, the issuance of the airworthiness license was described as "inadequate" and "weak", effectively putting into doubt that the aircraft was airworthy.

The airworthiness license of the aircraft had been issued in March 2006. The license was only issued under the condition that the required checks had been followed by the operator. PIA stated that the maintenance of the aircraft had been conducted in accordance with the maintenance schedule that had been approved for airworthiness. However, several shortcomings were noted. During the renewal of the license, the inspection was carried out by only one aircraft surveyor. Meanwhile, the issuance of the license to PIA was conducted by a junior field officer.

The investigation also found that current C and A checks could not ensure that the aircraft had been maintained in accordance with the correct technical practices and that airworthiness renewal process that was approved from C and A checks was regarded as possible loophole in the issuance of the license. An improved checklist for A and C checks was later ordered by investigators.

=== Conclusion ===
Citing from the final report of the investigation, the cause of the accident was described as complex and also deeply rooted with the organization and culture of PIA. The improper assembly that had been conducted by PIA on the right engine ultimately caused the malfunction of the engine. PIA couldn't properly monitor the fleet and as a result the defect was not detected. When the emergency occurred during the takeoff roll, the crew failed to follow the correct emergency procedure and mishandled their aircraft. All of these factors eventually caused the aircraft to crash. The investigation also noted the CAA's oversight failure on PIA.

The investigation released 11 safety recommendations, focusing mainly on maintenance procedures, maintenance quality assurance and regulatory oversight monitoring maintenance. Among those recommendations were better pairing of pilot and co-pilot, the implementation of SOAP for all engines, improvements on maintenance and quality control, and further CRM training. The investigation also ordered parties to comply with the recommendations, stating that those who didn't follow would be proceeded under the existing regulations.

== Aftermath ==
Speaking in the National Assembly of Pakistan, Speaker of the House Chaudhry Amir Hussain issued a rare criticism to the country's aviation regulatory body, the CAA, claiming that "all was not well". His remarks came after controversies between parliamentary members regarding the minimum infrastructure in airports in Pakistan. He stated that the government would be "very strict" with CAA because "the safety of VVIP flights" could also be compromised. He asked a probe to be conducted into the matter, but fellow parliament member asked for more time.

Another member of parliament, Secretary of Defence Tanvir Hussain Syed, was also critical on the perceived ineptitude of CAA officials. He accused the incumbent head of CAA of having no distant connection on the aviation industry and that there were officials in CAA that had taken unauthorized flights to abroad, which prompted calls for inquiry. He also criticized the investigating authorities of being inept on the progress of the probe, claiming that the report of the crash was "not with us but lying somewhere else".

There were protests from the families of the victims on the late compensation payment from PIA and the transparency of the investigation. Payment of compensation had been conducted by PIA since February 2007, however an accurate amount had yet to be received. Until 2010, disputes were still reported between families and PIA regarding the amount that had been received. In 2010, CAA officials and Pakistani authorities had still not published the result of the investigation into the public. Media report stated that the federal government of Pakistan "didn't even bother" to share the investigation progress to other contributing parties of the investigation.

In 2015, a petition was filed in Multan to conduct a case against CAA and PIA officials following allegations of negligence and "malicious intent" in the crash of Flight 688.

In response to the withdrawal of the Fokker F27 fleet from service, three of PIA's Fokker F27 were sold to Pakistan Navy. The decision to replace the fleet with ATR-42s were due to the aging Fokker fleet and the technological advancement of the latter type. However, despite the change of the aircraft type, the maintenance culture within PIA had not improved significantly. Lack of corrective actions within PIA maintenance eventually led to the crash of another turboprop, this time involving one of the newly delivered ATR-42, in Havelian in 2016.

== See also ==
- Pakistan International Airlines Flight 661, another accident which was caused by engine failure and followed by maintenance error 10 years later.
