= Shaheen Air =

Pakistani airline

Shaheen Air International

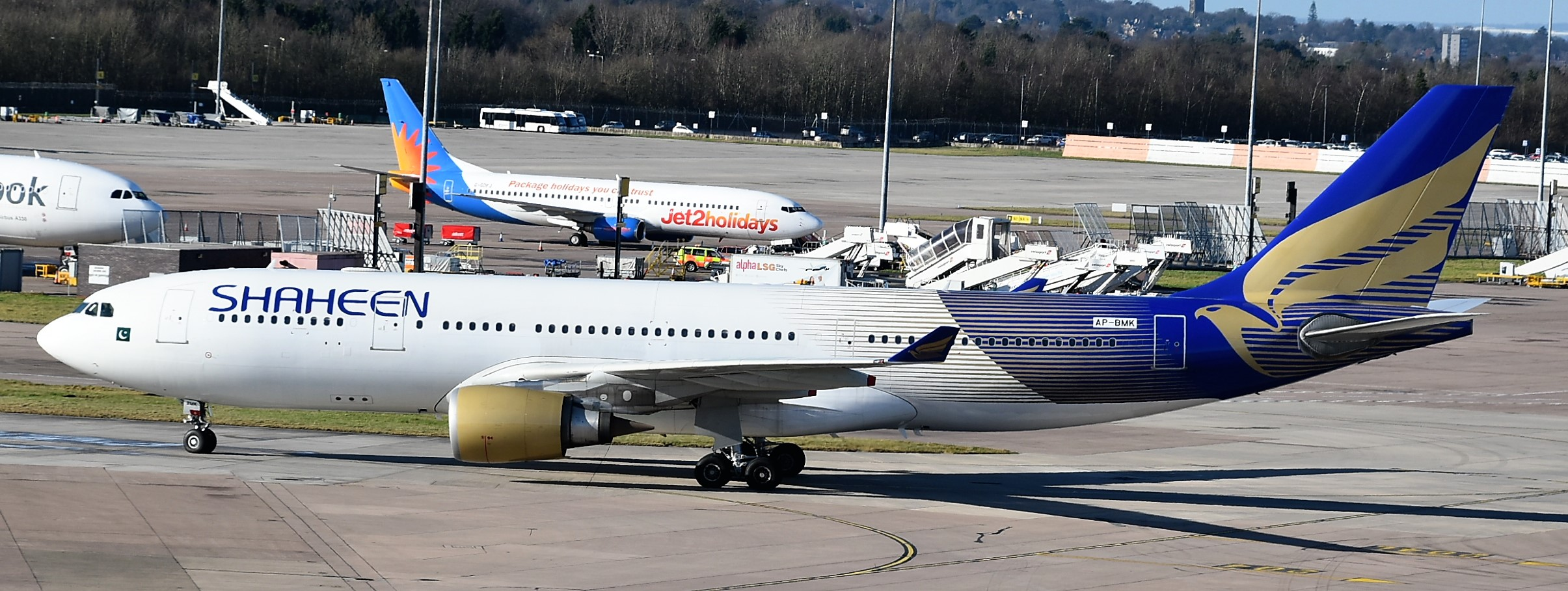
- Shaheen Air A330
IATA	ICAO	Call sign
NL	SAI	SHAHEEN AIR
- Founded: 1993 2019(relaunch)
- Commenced operations: 25 October 1994; 23 November 2019(Failed relaunch)
- Ceased operations: 8 October 2018
- Hubs: Jinnah International Airport
- Headquarters: Karachi, Pakistan
- Website: shaheenair.com (archives)

Shaheen Air International (Urdu: شاہین ایئر) was a private Pakistani airline with its head office at Jinnah International Airport in Karachi and was founded by the Shah family. It remained Pakistan's second-largest airline until its liquidation in 2018 due to financial troubles. The airline owed Rs. 1.36 billion to the Civil Aviation Authority of Pakistan (CAA), as well as salaries to its employees.

It provided passenger, cargo and charter services to major cities in Pakistan and the Middle East. It suspended all operations in October 2018.

== History ==
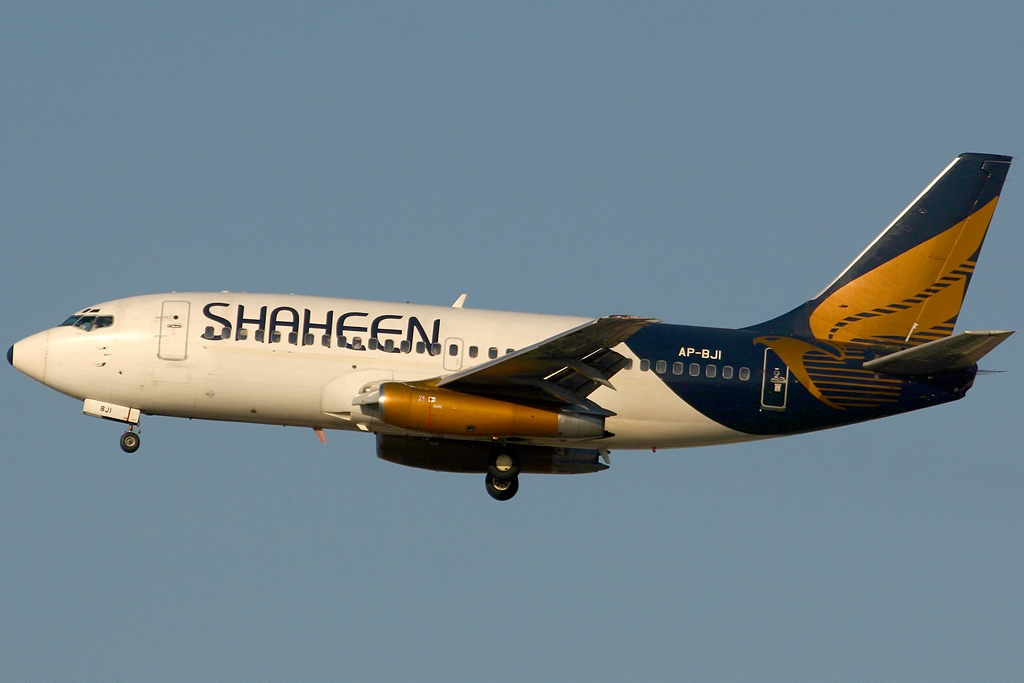
A former Shaheen Air Boeing 737-200

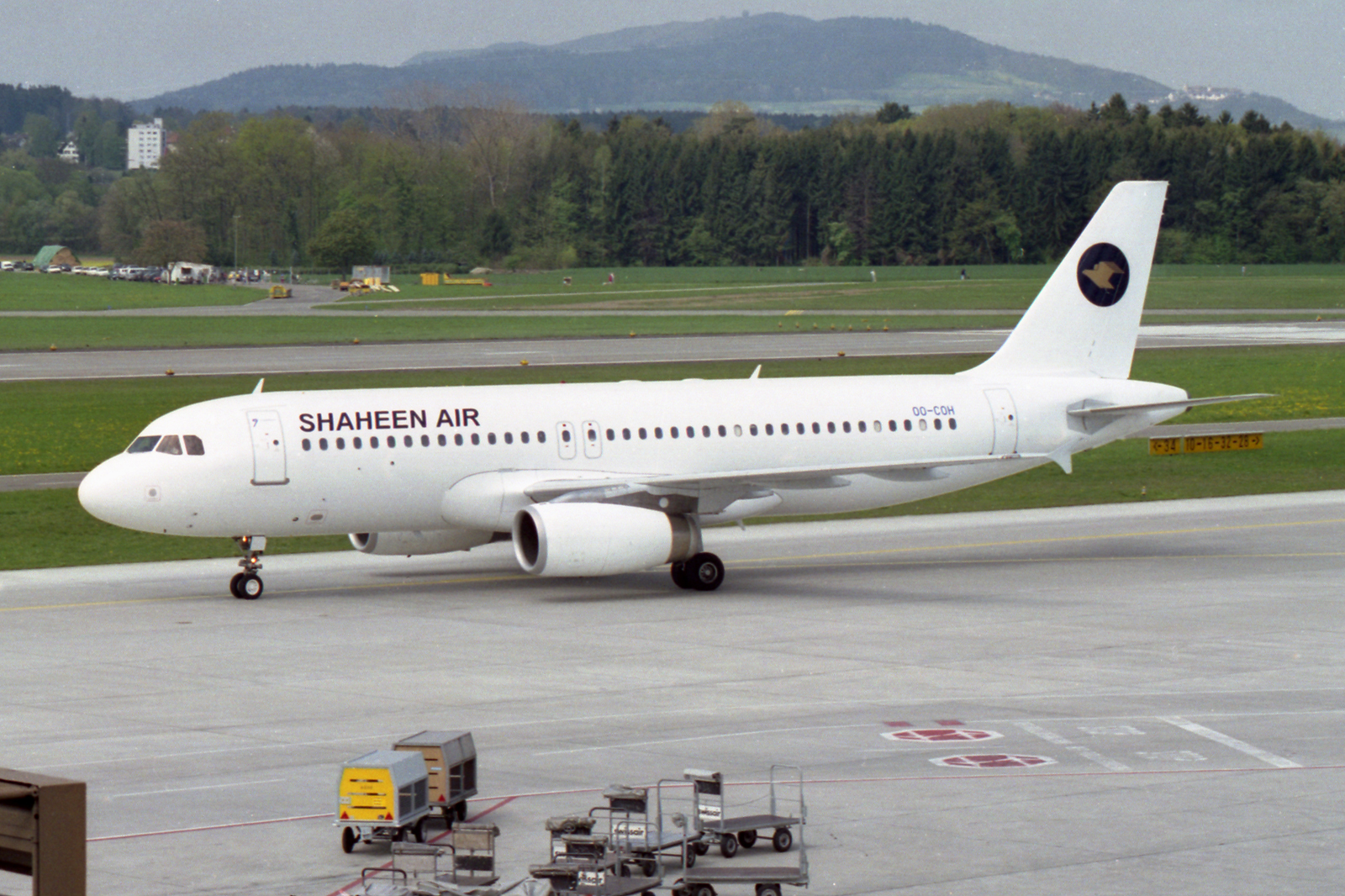
Shaheen Air A320

Shaheen Air International was founded in 1993 by Shaheen Foundation. Shaheen Air Cargo was a division of Shaheen Air International that was established in 1993, soon after the inception of the airline. Shaheen Air provided special services for sending small time-sensitive consignments. The airline's early operations were fraught with difficulties, exacerbated by a 50 percent fare discount for retired and serving military officers and high operating costs due to a limited number of aircraft on wet lease.

The airline faced financial challenges, losing Rs 60 million between December 1999 and May 2000, in addition to owing Rs 70 million to Pakistan Civil Aviation Authority (CAA) for services during the same period.

On 22 May 2004, the CAA grounded Shaheen Air as the airline owed it millions of rupees. Three days later the airline was cleared by the CAA to resume its domestic and international operations. The clearance letter was issued by CAA following receipt of a payment from Shaheen Air International towards the outstanding dues and funds. The same year, Shaheen Air International (SAI) became Shaheen Air and the airline introduced a new livery and corporate website.

Shaheen Air started its own maintenance repair organization (MRO) by the name of Shaheen Engineering and Aircraft Maintenance Services (SEAMS) to provide maintenance services to Shaheen Air as well as other regional and international airlines.

In its international operations, Shaheen Air operated between Pakistan and numerous destinations in the Middle East. Shaheen Air once started flight operations to Riyadh with three different routes from Pakistan.

Shaheen Air was Pakistan's second-largest airline next to the flag carrier, Pakistan International Airlines but due to the downturn in 2018, the airline declined. The airline was declared a defaulter by PCAA and FBR. In October 2018, SAI flight operations were completely suspended by the local regularity body PCAA and the airline declared a financial defaulter. Since November 2018, all SAI offices have closed.

=== Investor rumor and liquidation ===
Shaheen reported an unnamed investor from Saudi Arabia was to help the airline return to service from January 2019.

The owners of the airline later fled the country.

Even after repeated protests by the 5,000 employees, who were still owed months of wages, as of February 2019 no investigation into the matter had been initiated by any of the agencies, including the Federal Board of Revenue, Pakistan Civil Aviation Authority and the Federal Ministry of Aviation.

== Destinations ==
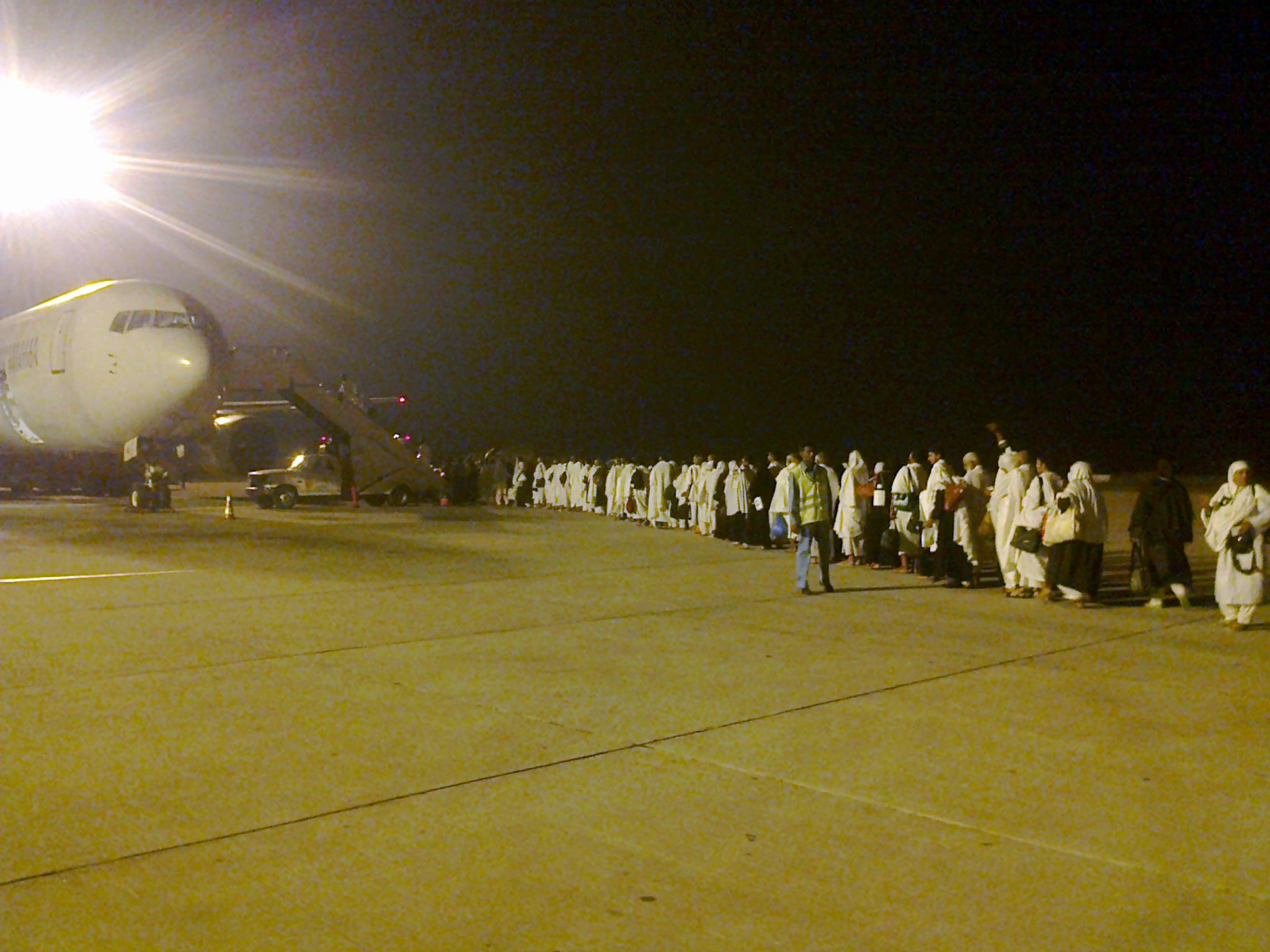
Shaheen Air Boeing 767 operating Hajj Flights

Shaheen Air operated the following services as of July 2018. All of their routes were suspended in October 2018. In January 2019, they announced they would not resume business.

Country	City	Airport	Notes
China	Guangzhou	Guangzhou Baiyun International Airport	Terminated
Iran	Mashhad	Mashhad International Airport	Terminated
Kuwait	Kuwait City	Kuwait International Airport	Terminated
Malaysia	Kuala Lumpur	Kuala Lumpur International Airport	Terminated
Oman	Muscat	Muscat International Airport	Terminated
Pakistan	Dera Ghazi Khan	Dera Ghazi Khan International Airport	Terminated
Pakistan	Faisalabad	Faisalabad International Airport	Terminated
Pakistan	Islamabad	Benazir Bhutto International Airport	Terminated
Pakistan	Islamabad	Islamabad International Airport	Terminated
Pakistan	Karachi	Jinnah International Airport	Terminated
Pakistan	Lahore	Allama Iqbal International Airport	Terminated
Pakistan	Multan	Multan International Airport	Terminated
Pakistan	Peshawar	Bacha Khan International Airport	Terminated
Pakistan	Quetta	Quetta International Airport	Terminated
Pakistan	Rahim Yar Khan	Shaikh Zayed International Airport	Terminated
Pakistan	Sialkot	Sialkot International Airport	Terminated
Pakistan	Sukkur	Sukkur Airport	Terminated
Qatar	Doha	Doha International Airport	Terminated
Saudi Arabia	Dammam	King Fahad International Airport	Terminated
Saudi Arabia	Jeddah	King Abdulaziz International Airport	Terminated
Saudi Arabia	Medina	Prince Mohammad Bin Abdulaziz Airport	Terminated
Saudi Arabia	Riyadh	King Khalid International Airport	Terminated
United Arab Emirates	Abu Dhabi	Abu Dhabi International Airport	Terminated
United Arab Emirates	Al Ain	Al Ain International Airport	Terminated
United Arab Emirates	Dubai	Dubai International Airport	Terminated
United Arab Emirates	Sharjah	Sharjah International Airport	Terminated
United Kingdom	Leeds/Bradford	Leeds Bradford Airport	Terminated
United Kingdom	Manchester	Manchester Airport	Terminated
Netherlands	Amsterdam	Amsterdam Airport Schiphol	Terminated

== Fleet ==
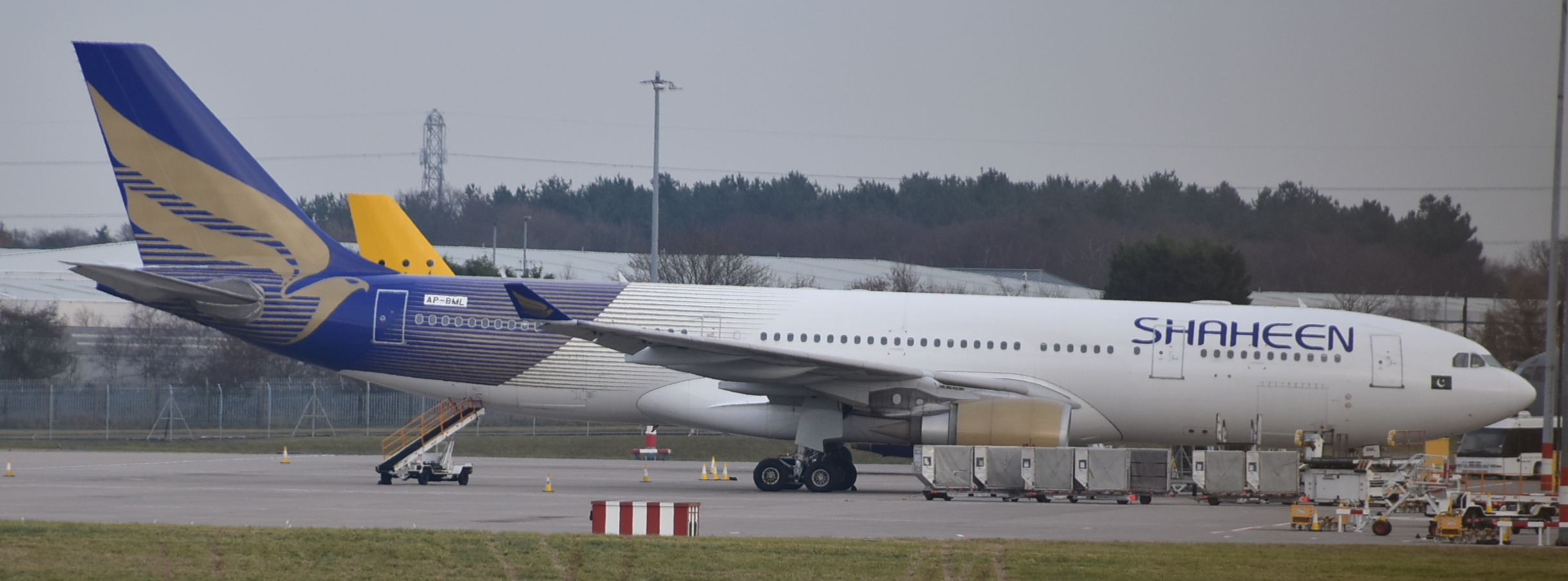
Shaheen Air Airbus A330-200 at Birmingham Airport after weather diversion from Manchester

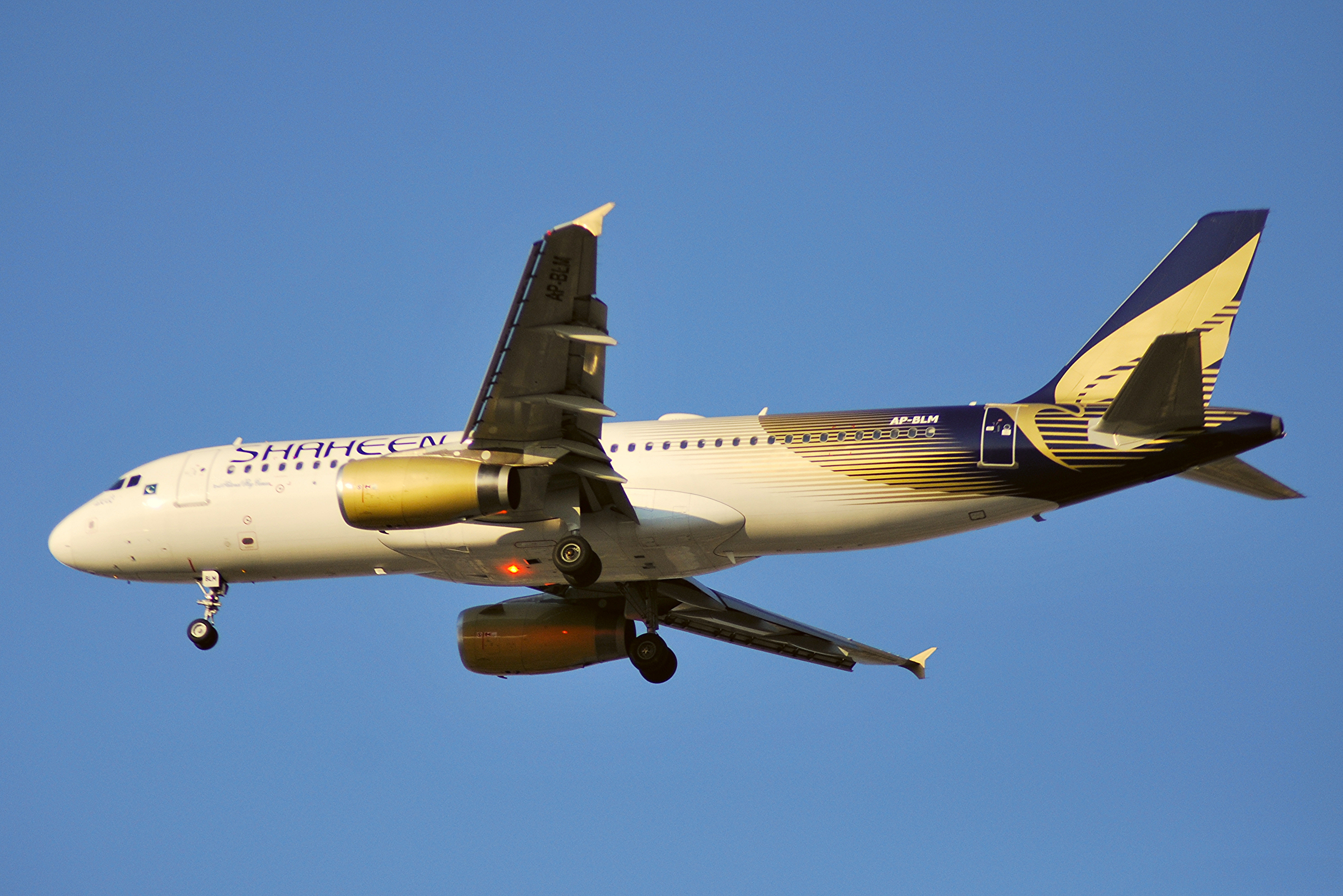
Shaheen Air Airbus A320-200

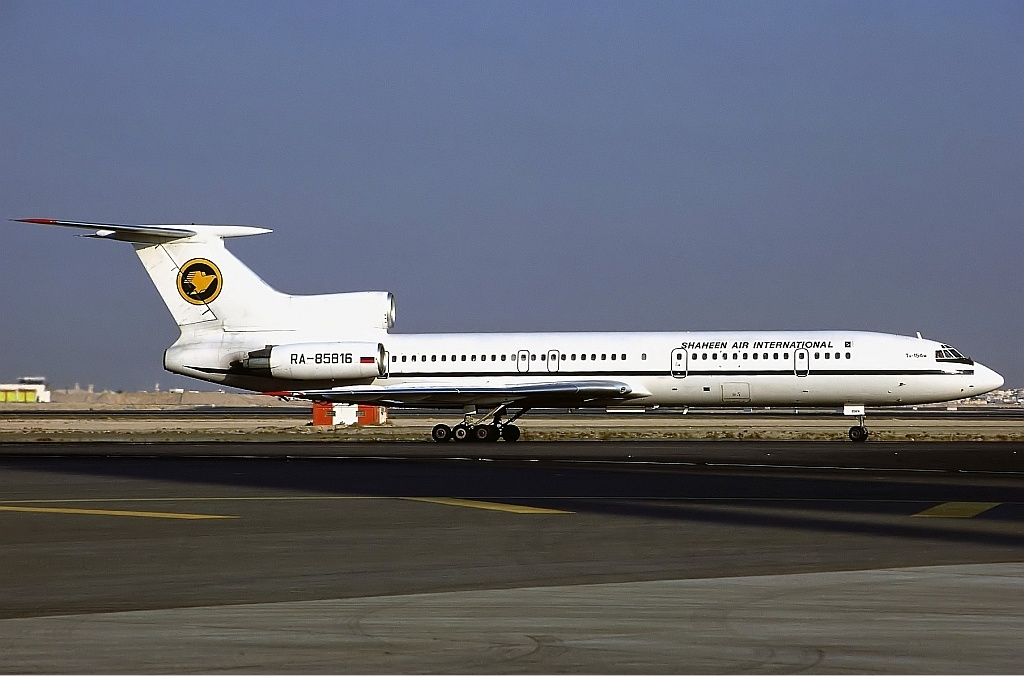
A Shaheen Air International Tupolev Tu-154M taxiing at Dubai International Airport, United Arab Emirates in 1999

Two Airbus A320-200 remain in storage. The rest of the aircraft were leased and were returned to the lessors after the airline ceased operations. Pakistani law requires a passenger airline to have a minimum of three aircraft in its fleet, and Shaheen's fleet of two stored aircraft does not fulfil the mandatory requirement of the license to operate. Many of the old derelict planes of Shaheen Air are abandoned at Jinnah International Airport. On 26 January 2020, one of these planes, a Boeing 737-200, registered as AP-BIS, was destroyed by fire. Two former Shaheen Air A330s were operated by SereneAir.

=== Former fleet ===
Aircraft	Previously operated
Boeing 737-200	15
Boeing 737-400	13
Boeing 737-800	2-3
Boeing 767-200ER	1
Airbus A300B4	1
Airbus A310	1
Airbus A319-100	6
Airbus A320-200	10
Airbus A330-200	4
Airbus A330-300	3
Tupolev Tu-154M	1-2

== Accidents and incidents ==
- 22 April 2012 - the main landing gear of a Boeing 737-400 operating as Flight 122 from Islamabad to Karachi collapsed during its landing at Karachi. No injuries were reported among the 122 passengers and six crew on board.
- 24 September 2015 - a Boeing 737-400 registered AP-BJR and operating as Flight 791 took off from a taxiway instead of the runway while departing from Sharjah. The aircraft was undamaged in the incident.
- 23 November 2015 - A Boeing 737-400 with the registration AP-BJO, operating as Flight 142, collapsed during a botched and mishandled landing. There were 112 passengers and seven crew members on board, and 10 passengers were injured. The cause of the accident was the captain's intoxication by alcohol.
- 26 January 2020 - a Boeing 737-200 registration AP-BIS, was destroyed by fire, the incident occurred at Karachi Jinnah International Airport, Pakistan.
