= Mohammed Naseer Khan =

Pakistani Physicist

Mohammed Naseer Khan (Urdu: محمد نصیر خان; 1941 – 10 July 2006) was a Pakistani physicist and academic administrator who served as a Rector of the Ghulam Ishaq Khan Institute of Engineering Sciences and Technology and later as a Vice-Chancellor of Bahauddin Zakariya University. He also served as a special advisor to the government for education, Federal Minister, Grade MP-1.

== Early life ==
Khan was born in 1941 in Abbottabad, Pakistan. His family were local nobility and from the Jadoon tribe; his father was a police officer and his mother a homemaker.

== Education and career ==
In 1996, he took a position as the Dean of the Faculty of Engineering Sciences at the GIKI Institute in Topi, Pakistan, and later became the university's Prorector and then Rector. He also established a research laboratory on the ‘Fabrication and Characterisation of Advanced Materials’ in the Faculty of Engineering Sciences.

After serving as Rector of GIKI, Khan became the Vice-Chancellor of Bahauddin Zakariya University in May 2005. There "he endeavoured to create conducive work environment in the previously politicised and troubled institution and took unprecedented bold steps to achieve outstanding results."

== Death ==
Khan was killed on Pakistan International Airlines Flight 688, which crashed in Multan on 10 July 2006, killing all 45 passengers and crew aboard. A memorial service was also held in Bahrain.

== Awards ==
- Sitara-i-Imtiaz, awarded for services to education in the field of physics, 2002
- Pride of Performance (1998)
