= Benazir Bhutto International Airport =

Airport in Islamabad, Pakistan (1930–2018)

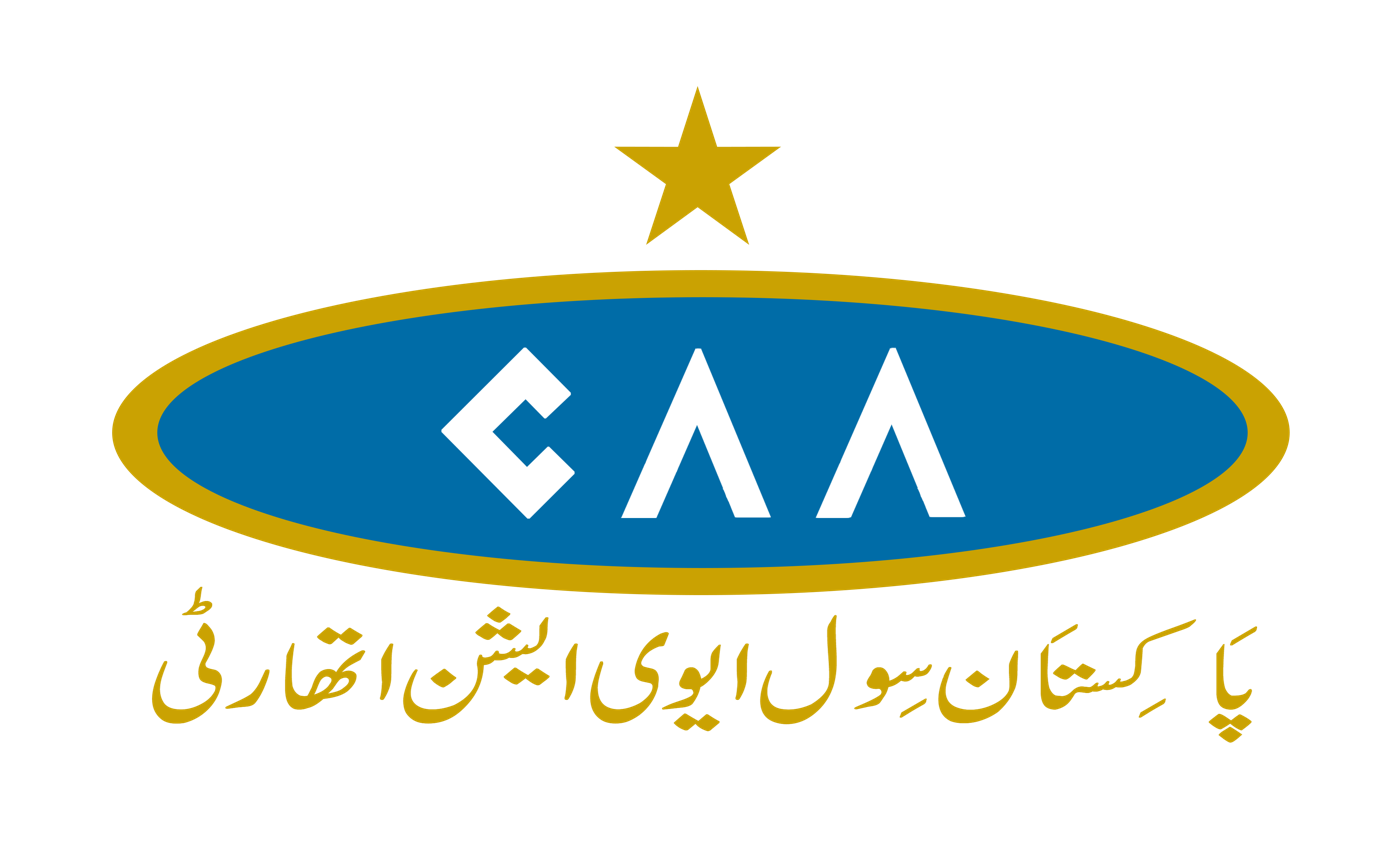
Benazir Bhutto International Airport بینظیر بھٹو بین الاقوامی ہوائی اڈے

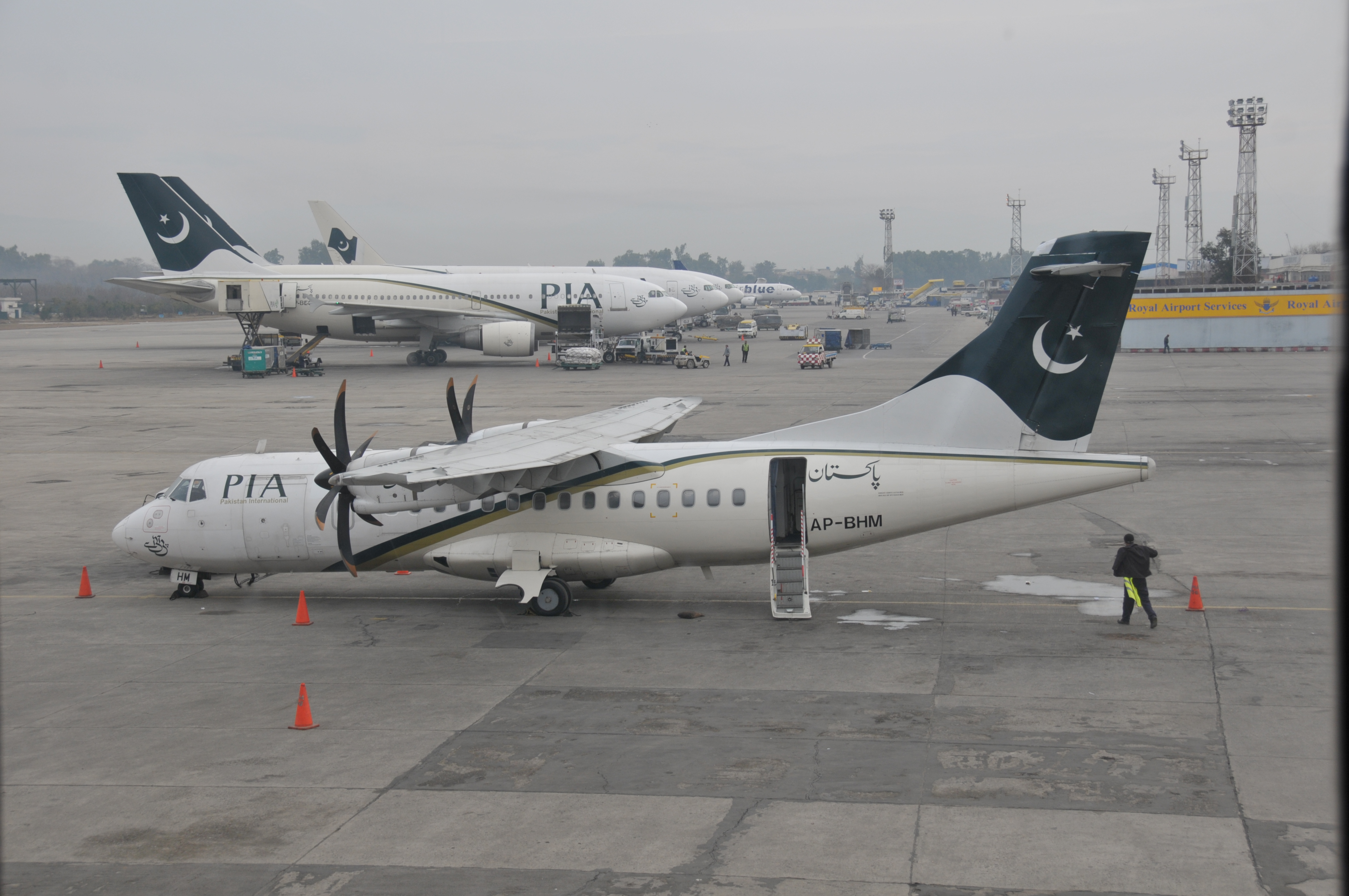
- View of the tarmac in 2011
- IATA: none; ICAO: OPRN

Summary
- Airport type: Defunct
- Owner: Pakistan
- Operator: Pakistan Civil Aviation Authority
- Serves: Islamabad-Rawalpindi metropolitan area
- Location: Chaklala, Rawalpindi-46210
- Opened: 1930 (as RAF Chaklala)
- Passenger services ceased: 3 May 2018
- Elevation AMSL: 508 m (1,667 ft)
- Coordinates: 33°36′59″N 073°05′57″E

Map
- Location in Pakistan

Runways
Direction	Length		Surface
Direction	m	ft	Surface
12/30	3,292	10,801	Asphalt

Benazir Bhutto International Airport (Urdu: بینظیر بھٹو بین الاقوامی ہوائی اڈے, ICAO: OPRN) was an airport which formerly served the Islamabad–Rawalpindi metropolitan area. It was the second-largest airport by air traffic in Pakistan, until 1 May 2018 when it was replaced by the new Islamabad International Airport. Also known as Chaklala Airbase, it was renamed after the late Pakistani prime minister Benazir Bhutto (1953–2007) in June 2008. The airport handled 4,767,860 passengers in 2015–16, compared to 3,610,566 in 2010–11.

The airport was located in the area of Chaklala in Rawalpindi, which neighbours Islamabad. Following the establishment of the new Islamabad International Airport, the airport is no longer used for civil aviation (except general aviation) and now forms a part of the adjoining PAF Base Nur Khan (also known as PAF Base Chaklala).

== History ==
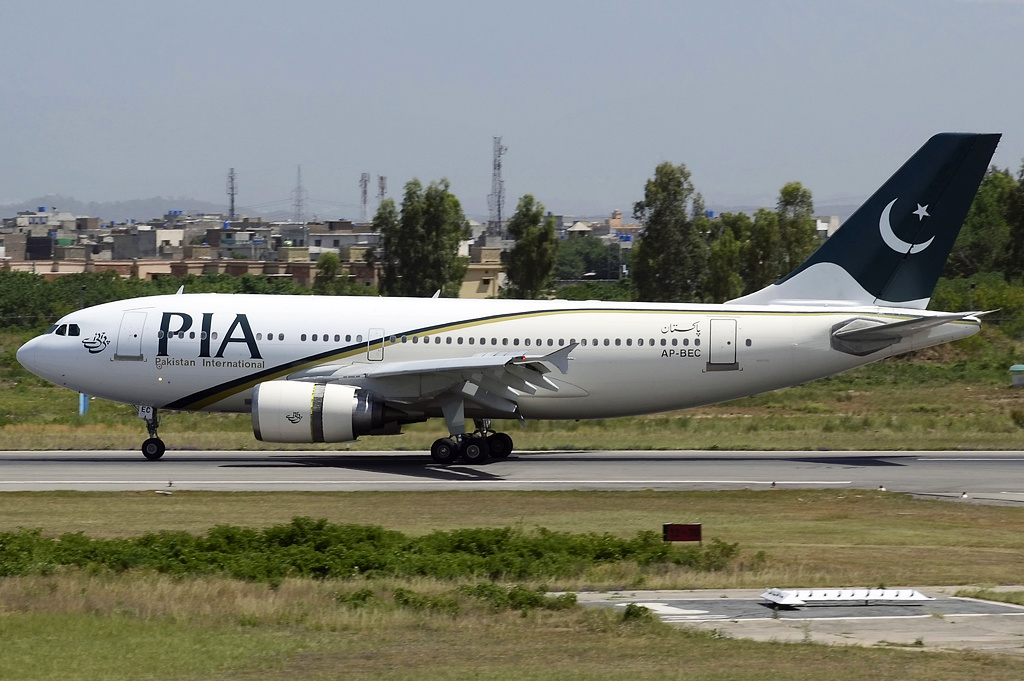
A Pakistan International Airlines jet landing at the airport in 2012

In March 2006, Pakistan International Airlines launched a direct flight from Islamabad to Toronto on Boeing 777s. In the fiscal year 2008–2009, over 3,136,664 passengers used the Benazir Bhutto International Airport and 34,025 aircraft movements were registered. The airport served as a hub for the flag carrier, Pakistan International Airlines. It was also the hub of Shaheen Air and a focus city of Airblue.

In January 2015, the government launched a Rs. 399 million project to renovate and expand the airport, including the 518 by 23 m (1,700 by 75 ft) taxi way link adjacent to the lone runway of the airport. The renovation was completed by March 2015.

The last flight to depart from this airport was PK791, operated by Pakistan International Airlines, heading for Birmingham, UK which departed at 11:39 AM PST marking the end of scheduled commercial flights to the airport.

== New airport ==
A new airport was constructed in Fateh Jang, Attock District, approximately 20 kilometres (12 mi) west of the twin cities. It was built to replace the existing Benazir Bhutto International Airport in response to increasing air traffic and passenger load. It is now completed, and has become the first greenfield airport in Pakistan and the first to support the landing of an Airbus A380. Built on an area of 3,289 acres, the project consisted of 90 check-in counters and a parking facility for 2,000 vehicles and will cater to an upward of 10 million people every year in its first phase and up to 25 million in the second phase. The terminal includes 15 gates with ten remote gates, a four-star hotel, duty-free shops, two runways, six taxiways, a food court and 42 immigration counters.

The airport is connected to Islamabad via the Srinagar Highway, and Rawalpindi via the GT Road. In April 2022, the Rawalpindi-Islamabad Metrobus was expanded to connect the airport with the metropolitan area. The airport was opened for commercial flight operations on 3 May 2018. First mockup flight was piloted by Captain Masood Bijrani and First Officer Hamad Khan from Pakistan International Airlines Corp.

== Facilities ==
Benazir Bhutto International Airport was a civil and military airport which handled VIPs as well as scheduled public operations for many airlines. Foreign diplomats, high level government officials as well as military officials were welcomed at this airport.

The airport was only able to handle eleven wide body aircraft at one time, with an additional five parking places for general aviation aircraft. It could not accommodate large aircraft such as the Airbus A380 or the Boeing 747-8. This airport did not have any air bridges installed, so buses took the passengers from the airport terminal to the aircraft, where air stairs were used.

== Current status ==
Since the airport was built on an airbase, the Pakistan Air Force has taken ownership of the apron and old terminal building of the airfield in a similar fashion to when Lahore's Allama Iqbal International Airport moved its terminals.

The runway is expected to remain in use by the PAF in the near future and VIPs and other dignitaries will continue to use the airbase instead of Islamabad International Airport.

General aviation by private companies is also expected to continue to use this airport instead of the new Islamabad International Airport.

== Accidents and incidents ==
- On 28 July 2010, Airblue Flight 202, a domestic flight from Karachi operated by Airbus A321 AP-BJB, crashed into the Margalla Hills in Islamabad while trying to land at the airport. The aircraft crashed into mountainous and wooded terrain near the city, killing all 152 people on board.
- On 20 April 2012, a Boeing 737-200 (AP-BKC), Bhoja Air Flight 213, which took off from Karachi's Jinnah International Airport, was destined for Islamabad's Benazir Bhutto International Airport, but crashed near Chaklala, killing all 127 people on board.

== See also ==
- List of airports in Pakistan
- Airlines of Pakistan
- Pakistan Civil Aviation Authority
- Transport in Pakistan
