= Multan International Airport =

Airport near Multan, South Punjab, Pakistan

Multan Airport
- IATA: MUX; ICAO: OPMT

Summary
- Airport type: Public/Military
- Operator: Pakistan Airports Authority
- Serves: Multan
- Location: Multan-60000 Punjab, Pakistan
- Elevation AMSL: 122.8 m (403 ft)
- Coordinates: 30°12′12″N 071°25′09″E
- Website: Multan International Airport
- Interactive map of Multan Airport

Runways
Direction	Length		Surface
Direction	m	ft	Surface
18/36	3,205	10,516	Concrete

Statistics (July 2024 – June 2025)
- Passengers: 1,386,973 ▼4.49%
- Aircraft movements: 9,515 ▼9.57%
- Cargo handled: 7,276 metric tons ▼6.39%
- Source: Statistics from the Pakistan Civil Aviation Authority

Multan International Airport (IATA: MUX, ICAO: OPMT) is an international airport located 4 km west of the city of Multan, Pakistan. The airport is South Punjab's largest and busiest airport. Multan International Airport offers flights throughout Pakistan, as well as direct flights to Bahrain, Oman, Qatar, Saudi Arabia, and the United Arab Emirates.

In March 2015, a new terminal building was formally inaugurated by the Prime Minister of Pakistan Muhammad Nawaz Sharif. Following the opening of the new terminal, passenger traffic soared from 384,571 in 2014–2015, to 904,865 in 2015–2016.

== History ==
=== Early beginning ===
Multan International Airport traces its origins to the British Empire, when the Royal Air Force used the open space to fly in and out of the region during 1919. The area was used for aircraft that were able to land on gravel and grass surfaces. In 1934, Imperial Airways started to use the airfield for civil aircraft flights since Multan was considered a strategic position in the Punjab province of India. It was not until 1938 that Imperial Airways started to operate regular flights out of Multan. The flight would originate in Lahore, then fly into Multan, before continuing its journey to Jacobabad and then Karachi.

Following the independence of Pakistan from the British, Pak Air, a new airline to the dominion, started operations from Multan Airport. Multan Flying Club was also set up at the airport within the same year. It was not until the birth of the national flag carrier, Pakistan International Airlines, in 1957, that PIA started operations from Multan Airport using Douglas DC-3 aircraft. In 1963, due to growth of the number of flights and larger aircraft requirements, the runway, taxiways and aprons where carpeted using bitumen. A new control tower was constructed to meet the technological changes at that time. In 1971, as PIA had acquired Boeing aircraft, the runway was extended to 2,743 by 30 m (9,000 by 100 ft) to handle heavier aircraft and more passengers. The terminal building was extended in 1977, which also allowed the airport to handle Boeing 720 aircraft. In 1980–1988, the airport runway was strengthened and re-carpeted for the arrival of the Airbus A300. It was not until 1999 that Pakistan International Airlines and the private airline Aero Asia operated international flights from the airport. Flights began to destinations in the Middle East such as Dubai and Kuwait.

=== Recent development ===
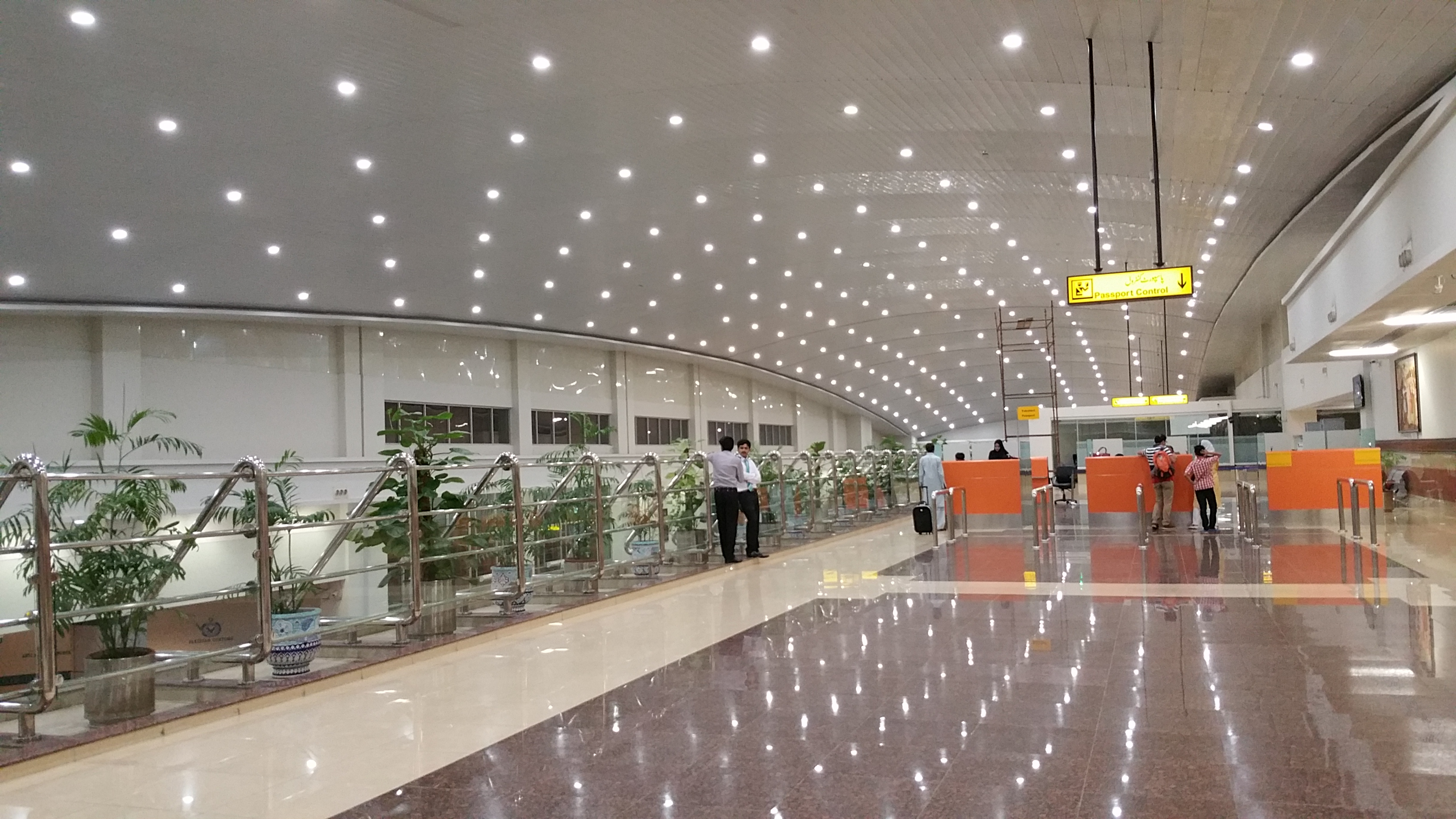
Multan International Airport's new terminal was built in 2015.

As the demand for air travel began to surge, the Pakistan Civil Aviation Authority decided to upgrade the facilities for the airport in 2005. Initially the runway was upgraded to handle Boeing 747-400 operations at a cost of Rs 720m. On 15 December 2006, Shaheen Air started four weekly flights from Karachi to Multan. The airport also reported an operating profit of Rs 1bn within that year.

In December 2007, Director General CAA, Farooq Rehmatullah held a press conference that the terminal building would be expanded as well as airside facilities at a cost of Rs4.5bn. In April 2009, the runway, taxiways and apron were upgraded so the airport could handle large aircraft. The groundbreaking ceremony was held by the then PM Syed Yousaf Raza Gillani. Pakistan-based Engineering Consultants International Limited (ECIL) was awarded the contract to extend the runway and expand the terminal building.

In January 2010, the Pakistan Civil Aviation Authority decided that a brand new terminal with four jet bridges would be constructed instead of expanding the current terminal. In June 2010, PM Yousaf Raza Gillani carried out the ground breaking ceremony for the terminal building and inaugurated the first Pakistan International Airlines Boeing 747 Hajj flight on 28 October 2010.

During 2011, PIA introduced weekly flights for Jeddah and Medina. Flydubai announced thrice weekly flights between Multan and Dubai with Boeing 737-800 aircraft from 14 March 2013 and became the first foreign airline to operate from the airport after independence. Shaheen Air International restarted its daily operation from Karachi with Boeing 737 in February 2012, and Bhoja Air launched two weekly flights from Karachi with Boeing 737-200 in March 2012. Air Indus announced daily service for Multan – Karachi from 20 August 2013. Shaheen Air International started twice-a-week flight service for Multan – Dubai sector from 31 March 2013. Shaheen Air International announced two weekly flights between Multan and Medina from 1 June 2013. Pakistan International Airlines started two weekly direct flights for Jeddah and Medina from January 2014. Pakistan International Airlines announced weekly service for Multan – Sharjah from 30 March 2014. Shaheen Air International announced twice a week service for Jeddah - Multan from December 2014.

In March 2015, the new terminal of Multan International Airport was formally inaugurated by PM Nawaz Sharif with former PM Yousaf Raza Gillani as well as several high-ranking officials. All operations have now shifted from the old terminal to the new one, with flights increasing with more destinations and routes being opened up for the city of Multan. Keeping the international standards in view, a new air traffic control tower was constructed as well which is equipped with modern equipment and navigation systems. A cargo complex of international standard has also been established with a capacity of 10,000 metric tonnes per year to host international cargo flights from Multan which will boost exports of fruits particularly mangos and vegetables. There are plans that this would further increase to 30,000 metric tonnes every year.

After the transfer of all operations to new terminal, Airblue announced it would start a twice a week flight service for Islamabad from 3 April 2015. Airblue also announced it would start twice a week service for Jeddah from 4 April 2015 and twice weekly service for Sharjah from 10 April 2015. Qatar Airways announced it would start 3 times a week service by A320 with 2 class seating for Doha - Multan sector from 1 August 2015 to get the facility for connections to USA and Europe. Air Arabia announced 4 weekly flights for Sharjah - Multan sector from 1 May 2015. Flydubai announced it would increase its 3 times weekly service to daily flights for Multan from 26 May 2015 as they got a good load for the sector. Air Arabia also got a successful response so they announced they would increase its service to daily flights for Multan from 31 May 2015. Emirates announced they were going to start 4 times a week flight operation by Boeing 777-300 with two-class seating to provide service for Dubai - Multan sector from 1 August 2015 which will facilitate the travelers to get connections for MENA Region, Far East, USA and Europe, this service will also provide the international cargo facility as every flight can carry up to 23 tonnes of cargo. Flydubai announced they would increase its frequency to 9 flights a week from 10 July 2015, two additional flights will provide the service on Wednesdays and Fridays to facilitate the travelers to/from Multan. After getting a successful business on Jeddah and Sharjah routes Airblue announced it would start twice a week flight service for Medina as well from 18 August 2015. Pakistan International Airlines opened more new routes from Multan, announcing the introduction of one weekly flight to Abu Dhabi by A320 from 26 October 2015 and one weekly flight for Muscat from 14 November 2015, also using the A320. Gulf Air expanded their operation in Pakistan, opening more routes so they announced four weekly flights by A320 for Bahrain - Multan sector from 14 December 2015 which will also provide connections to the USA. Shaheen Air introduced Riyadh as a new destination from Multan, offering twice-weekly service with an A320 starting from April 6, 2016. Airblue expanded its operations to Multan, announcing four weekly flights between Karachi and Multan starting April 19, 2016, using an A320. Pakistan International Airlines launched a new route between Multan and Riyadh, providing one weekly flight from April 21, 2016. Iran’s Taban Air began a seasonal service between Mashhad and Multan starting May 17, 2016. Air Indus ceased operations, ending its Multan-Karachi service as of June 2016. On November 23, 2016, Airblue began flying from Dubai to Multan, offering two weekly flights. Pakistan International Airlines resumed two weekly flights between Multan and Quetta from December 1, 2016. Saudia launched four weekly flights between Jeddah and Multan on April 1, 2017, aiming to capture a share of the market. Shaheen Air International added Muscat to its Multan network with one weekly flight starting April 24, 2017. Oman's SalamAir began flying three weekly flights between Muscat and Multan on May 23, 2017, expanding into the Pakistani market. Emirates announced the end of its operations to Multan on October 26, 2018, though it continued codeshare flights with Flydubai to Dubai. Gulf Air ceased its Multan operations on October 26, 2024.

== Structure ==
Multan International Airport is fitted with all the essentials for domestic and international flights with the inauguration of the new terminal. The information below is correct as of April 2016.

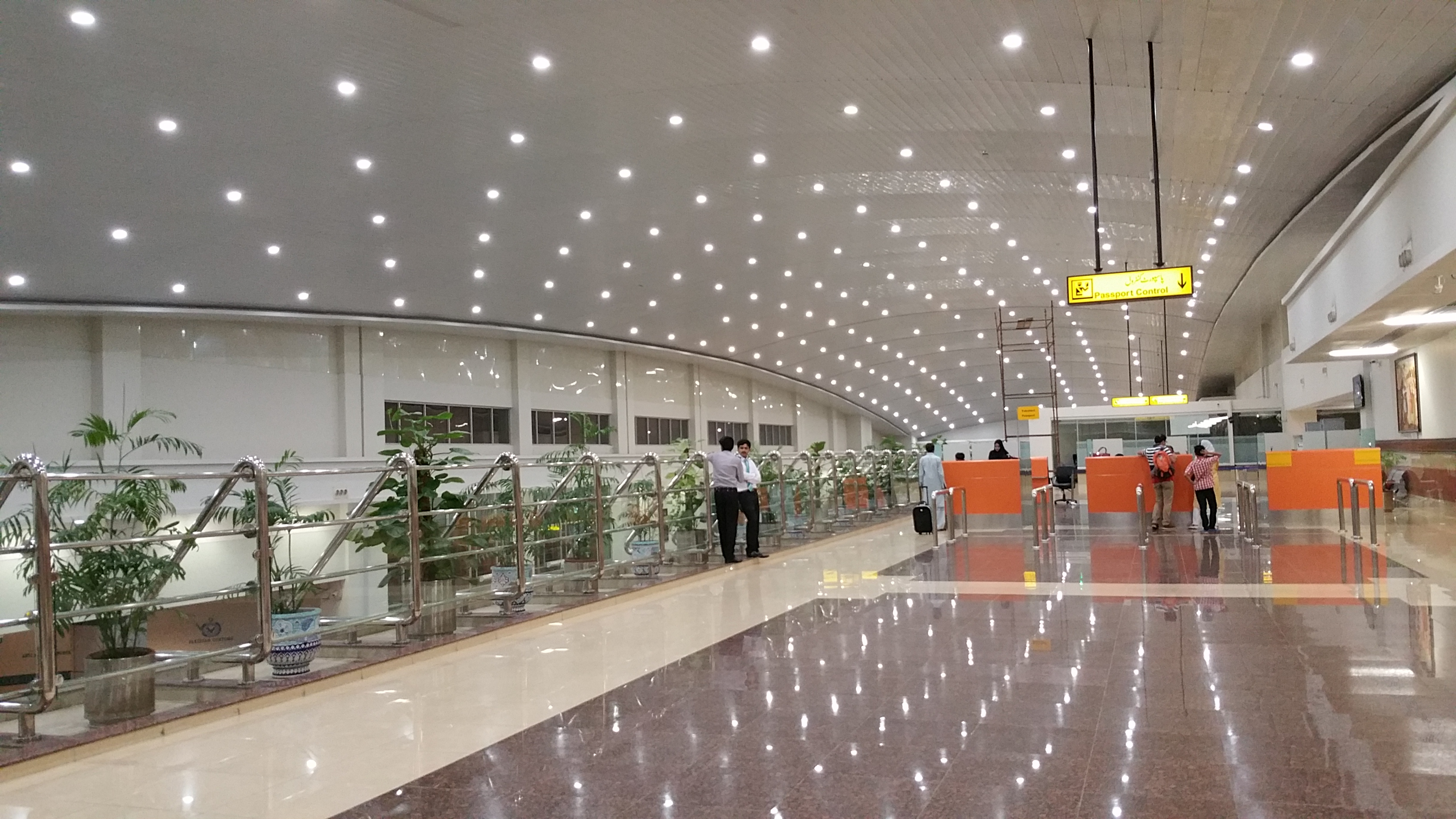
Immigration counters at International Departure

Apron

- Four boarding jet bridges (Bay-1, 2, 3 and 4).
- Two wide-body and four narrow-body aircraft nose in parking available.
- Equipped with complete airfield lighting system (dimensions: 230 m × 145 m (755 ft × 475 ft) with 11 m (35 ft) shoulders)

Runway

- ILS/DME VOR/NDB equipped 18/36 runway (dimensions: 3,204 m × 46 m (10,512 ft × 151 ft) with 7.6 m (25 ft) shoulders on each side).
- Capable of handling up to Boeing 747-400, Boeing 777-300ER, and Airbus A340-600 aircraft.
- Instrument Landing System and Cat-I AFL System.
- High Intensity Lighting System.
- Parallel taxi-way running alongside Runway 18/36 for speedy exit and departure.
- Emergency alternative for Islamabad and Lahore.

Airport Services

- Pakistan State Oil provide fuel services to all airlines flying out of the airport. (Jet A-100)
- Fire fighting and Rescue Services. ICAO Category-9.
- FIDS systems located in the lounges and briefing concourses showing television programs and flight information.
- Airport Masjid located outside the terminal on the right hand side.
- Airport Medical Center located adjacent to CAA Masjid.
- Rent A Car facility and Metro Radio Cab Services.
- Custom and Immigration for international flights
- Airline Ticketing offices (Pakistan International Airlines, airblue, flydubai, Air Arabia, Emirates, Qatar Airways and Gulf Air).

Ground Handling Agents

- Pakistan International Airlines.
- airblue Ltd.
- Royal Airport Services (RAS).
- Gerry's DNATA

Cargo Complex

- Cargo/Freight Services provided by Pakistan International Airlines, booking can be made at PIA Booking Office located at Abdali Road or Airport Cargo Office.
- International Cargo/Freight Service provided by Emirates as their flights are capable of carrying up to 23 tonnes of cargo which helps local exporters to send their cargo to any of 78 countries in the world where Emirates operates.

Flying Schools/ Institutions

- Multan Flying Club

Additional

- Pakistan Meteorological Department
- Ramada Hotels counter
- Foreign Currency Exchange Counter

== Airlines and destinations ==
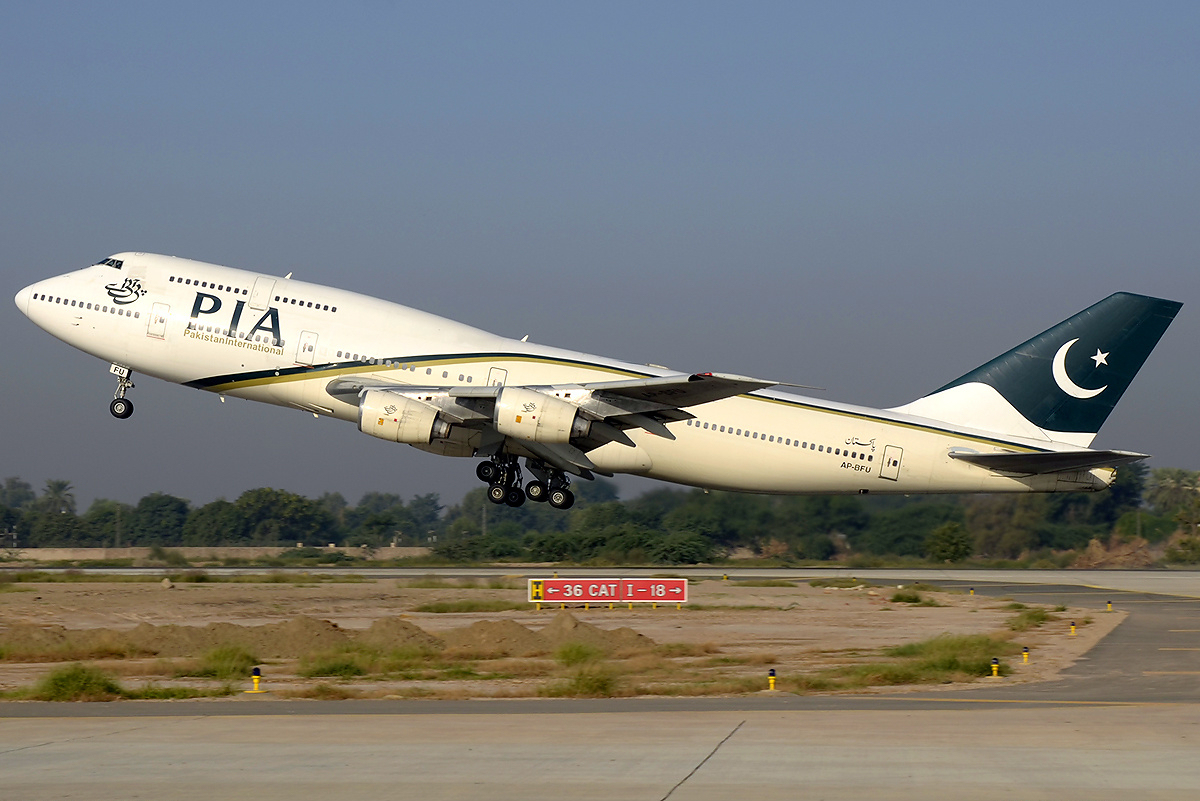
PIA Boeing 747-300 taking off from the newly renovated runway.

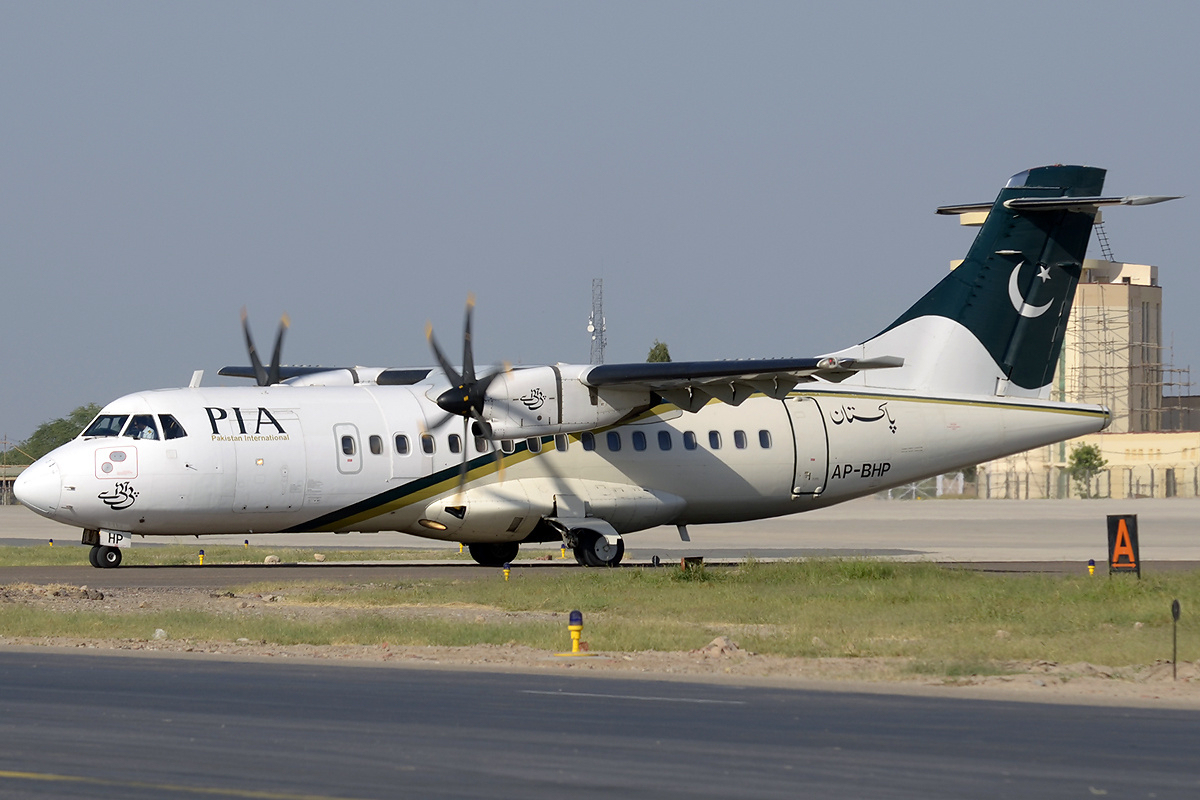
PIA ATR 42 taxiing to the runway.

Airlines	Destinations
Air Arabia	Abu Dhabi, Sharjah
Airblue	Dubai–International, Jeddah, Sharjah
AirSial	Jeddah
Flydubai	Dubai–International
Fly Jinnah	Karachi
Pakistan International Airlines	Dammam, Dubai–International, Jeddah, Karachi, Medina, Muscat, Sharjah, Riyadh, Al Qassim
Qatar Airways	Doha
South Air	Islamabad
SalamAir	Muscat
Saudia	Jeddah

== Access ==
=== Car ===
Multan International Airport is situated in the well populated area of Multan Cantonment and it is easily accessible through Airport Road by using Jamil Abad Road from any part of the city. There is a dropoff lane at the front of the terminal as well as a wide car parking area which can accommodate more than 400 vehicles.

=== Taxi ===
Metro Radio Cab Services provides service directly from the airport and their counter is situated at the landside of the terminal to book the cab.

Private rental car facilities are also available at the airport.

=== Rickshaw ===
Traditional auto-rickshaws are also available at the airport parking area and entrance which are quite popular to travel short distances within the city.

=== Train ===
Multan Cantonment railway station is the nearest railway station, less than 3 km away from the airport to get the railway connections to other parts of the country.

== Statistics ==
The following table provides details of the major traffic flows out of Multan in terms of passenger numbers, aircraft movements, cargo, and mail. The results were collected by the Civil Aviation Authority of Pakistan:

Year	Aircraft movements (Commercial)	Passengers (Intl. and Domestic)	Cargo handled (M. Tons)	Mail handled (M. Tons)
2005-06	4,902	262,582	1,623	N/A
2006-07	3,901	240,573	1,273	49.52
2007-08	3,943	250,661	932	31.966
2008-09	2,474	237,358	1,006	27.59
2009-10	3,390	151,135	86	5.02
2010-11	3,789	218,830	553	7.34
2011-12	4,089	228,312	489	9.87
2012-13	2,732	211,165	352	11.83
2013-14	3,950	359,342	415	3.26
2014-15	3,512	404,268	413	1
2015-16	8,295	946,389	1,468	1
2016-17	9,122	1,167,105	4,447	2
2017-18	10,680	1,339,179	7,114	1
2018-19	8,335	997,978	6,230	1
2019-20	5.647	842,957	4,178	0

== Incidents and accidents ==
- On 10 July 2006, a Fokker F-27 Friendship - 200 took off from Multan International Airport. Flight PK688 suffered engine problems soon after take-off, causing the pilot to lose control. The aircraft crashed in a nearby grassy field, causing it to catch fire on impact, leaving all 45 passengers and crew dead. One flight attendant, who initially survived the crash, later died in hospital.

== See also ==
- List of airports in Pakistan
- Airlines of Pakistan
- Transport in Pakistan
- Pakistan Civil Aviation Authority
