= Deaths in July 2006 =

The following is a list of notable deaths in July 2006.

Entries for each day are listed alphabetically by surname. A typical entry lists information in the following sequence:

- Name, age, country of citizenship at birth, subsequent country of citizenship (if applicable), reason for notability, cause of death (if known), and reference.

== July 2006 ==
=== 1 ===
- Umberto Abronzino, 85, Italian-born American member of US National Soccer Hall of Fame as an administrator.
- Michael Barton, 91, English cricketer.
- Edwin Broderick, 89, American Roman Catholic Bishop of Albany, New York, and director of Catholic Relief Services.
- Willie Denson, 69, American singer and songwriter ("Mama Said"), lung cancer.
- Robert French, 88, Australian Olympic sailor (1948, 1956, 1960).
- Irving Green, 90, American record industry executive, co-founder of Mercury Records.
- Ryutaro Hashimoto, 68, Japanese politician, Prime Minister of Japan (1996–1998).
- Louis Jacobs, 85, British rabbi and founder of Masorti movement.
- Yousuf Khan, 68, Indian footballer, and Olympian (1960), heart attack.
- Robert Lepikson, 54, Estonian businessman and politician.
- Roderick MacLeish, 80, American journalist, author and filmmaker.
- Padmakar Pandit, 71, Indian cricket umpire.
- Philip Rieff, 83, American sociologist and author.
- Erik Terkelsen, 79, Danish Olympic footballer (1952).
- Fred Trueman, 75, English and Yorkshire cricketer, lung cancer.

=== 2 ===
- Hub Anslow, 80, Canadian ice hockey player (New York Rangers).
- Cecilia Cole, 86, Gambian politician.
- André Fevret, 64, French Olympic rower (1964).
- Maurice Fox-Strangways, 9th Earl of Ilchester, 86, British peer and engineer, member House of Lords and RAF group captain.
- Balázs Horváth, 63, Hungarian politician, former Interior Minister, lung cancer.
- Herty Lewites, 66, Nicaraguan presidential candidate.
- Jan Murray, 89, American Borscht Belt comedian.
- Tihomir Ognjanov, 79, Serbian footballer and Olympian (1952).
- Joan Quennell, 82, British Conservative MP for Petersfield 1960–1974.
- Anatole Shub, 78, American journalist and author on Russia. Complications from pneumonia and a stroke.
- Jeffrey Wasserman, 59, American painter.

=== 3 ===
- Mark Tennyson, 5th Baron Tennyson, 86, British aristocrat.
- Francis Cammaerts, 90, British Special Operations Executive (SOE) agent, led 30,000 French Resistance fighters.
- Dick Dickey, 79, American basketball player (Boston Celtics).
- Gerhard Fischer, 84, Norwegian-born German diplomat.
- Joseph Goguen, 65, American computer scientist.
- Benjamin Hendrickson, 55, American actor (As the World Turns, Manhunter, Regarding Henry), suicide by gunshot.
- Wilbert Hopper, 73, Canadian businessman, president, CEO and chairman of Petro-Canada.
- Gwyn Jones, 89, Welsh physicist and public servant.
- Lars Korvald, 90, Norwegian politician, Prime Minister of Norway.
- Rudolf Kus, 91, Slovak Olympic boxer (1936).
- Lorraine Hunt Lieberson, 52, American mezzo-soprano opera singer, breast cancer.
- Sir Carol Mather, 87, British Conservative MP.
- Nimrod Ping, 58, British politician, Brighton city councillor. Complications of liver disease, caused by Hepatitis C.
- Jack Smith, 92, American musician and game show host (You Asked for It), leukemia.
- Joe Weaver, 71, American musician, stroke.

=== 4 ===
- Chet Hajduk, 87, American baseball player (Chicago White Sox).
- John Hinde, 94, Australian film critic and journalist.
- Norbert Kerckhove, 73, Belgian cyclist.
- Bobby Joe Mason, 70, American basketball player (Bradley Braves, Harlem Globetrotters).
- Marilyn Olinger, 78, American baseball player.
- Dorothy Hayden Truscott, 80, American bridge player and author, complications from Parkinson's disease.
- Jean-François d'Orgeix, 85, French equestrian and actor, Olympic medalist (1948, 1952), traffic collision.

=== 5 ===
- Barbara Albright, 51, American author, brain tumor.
- Gert Fredriksson, 86, Swedish Olympic canoeist (1948, 1952, 1956, 1960), cancer.
- Lewis Glucksman, 80, American banker.
- Hans Gmoser, 73, Austrian-born Canadian businessman.
- Kenneth Lay, 64, American businessman, CEO of U.S. energy firm Enron, later convicted of fraud, heart attack.
- Don Lusher, 82, British jazz trombonist and band leader.
- Paul Nelson, 69, American rock critic (Rolling Stone)
- Gabriel Roberge, 88, Canadian politician, member of the House of Commons of Canada (1958-1962).
- Amzie Strickland, 87, American actress.
- ʻUluvalu, 55, Tongan Tuʻi Pelehake, traffic collision.

=== 6 ===
- Juan de Ávalos, 94, Spanish sculptor, heart attack.
- Ralph Ginzburg, 76, American publisher, multiple myeloma.
- Al Hodge, 55, English rock guitarist and songwriter, cancer.
- John Michael Manos, 83, American judge.
- Juan Pablo Rebella, 32, Uruguayan film director, suicide by gunshot.
- Kasey Rogers, 80, American actress (Bewitched, Strangers on a Train, Peyton Place) and motocross racer, stroke.
- E. S. Turner, 96, English historian and journalist.
- Tom Weir, 91, Scottish climber, author and broadcaster.

=== 7 ===
- Kees Andrea, 92, Dutch artist.
- Luis Barragan, 34, American businessman and philanthropist, president of 1-800-Mattress, drowned.
- Syd Barrett, 60, English musician (Pink Floyd), diabetes.
- Reinhold O. Carlson, 100, American politician.
- Rudi Carrell, 71, Dutch-born German TV entertainer, lung cancer.
- Dorothea Church, 83, African-American model, first successful black model in Paris.
- Ken Exel, 85, American basketball player (Syracuse Nationals, Minneapolis Lakers).
- John Warner Fitzgerald, 81, American lawyer, Chief Justice of the Michigan Supreme Court.
- Daniel Hollands, 79, Canadian politician, member of the House of Commons of Canada (1972-1974).
- Elias Hrawi, 79, Lebanese politician, President of Lebanon (1989–98), cancer.
- Dina Kaminskaya, 87, Russian lawyer who defended Soviet dissidents.
- Eugene Kurtz, 82, American composer.
- John Money, 84, New Zealand-born psychologist and sex researcher at Johns Hopkins University, Parkinson's disease.
- Ilpo Nuolikivi, 64, Finnish Olympic skier (1968).
- Mícheál Ó Domhnaill, 53, Irish musician with the Bothy Band.
- Eric Schopler, 79, German-born American psychologist known for his pioneering work in autism treatment, cancer.
- Noël Turrell, 58, French Olympic biathlete (1972).
- Govindappa Venkataswamy, 87, Indian ophthalmologist, founder of Aravind Eye Hospitals.
- Frank Zeidler, 93, American politician, Mayor of Milwaukee (1948–1960) and last Socialist Party of America mayor of a major city.

=== 8 ===
- George Albee, 84, American psychologist.
- June Allyson, 88, American actress (Too Young to Kiss, The DuPont Show with June Allyson, Two Girls and a Sailor), pulmonary respiratory failure and acute bronchitis.
- Pjetër Arbnori, 71, Albanian politician, speaker of the Parliament of Albania (1992–1997).
- Michael Barrett, 79, Irish politician.
- Eric Bedford, 78, Australian politician, member of the Wran Government ministry 1976–1985 in New South Wales.
- Franco Belgiorno-Nettis, 91, Australian industrialist and patron of the arts, founder of Transfield Holdings, Australia's largest engineering and construction firm, fall.
- David Bright, 49, American researcher into underwater exploration and shipwrecks, cardiac arrest stemming from decompression sickness.
- Ana María Campoy, 80, Argentine actress, pneumonia.
- Sabine Dünser, 29, Liechtenstein singer and lyricist (Erben der Schöpfung, Elis), cerebral hemorrhage.
- Sir Richard Gorham, 88, Bermudian businessman and politician.
- Peter Hawkins, 82, British actor (Whirligig, Doctor Who, Flower Pot Men).
- Catherine Leroy, 60, French photojournalist known for her coverage of the Vietnam War in Life, lung cancer.
- Raja Rao, 97, Indian novelist (Kanthapura).
- Jesse Simons, 88, American labor arbitrator, heart failure.
- Skip Teal, 72, Canadian ice hockey player (Boston Bruins).
- Dorothy Uhnak, 76, American novelist.
- Jean Vernier, 82, French Olympic long-distance runner (1948, 1952).

=== 9 ===
- Chris Drake, 82, American actor.
- Fred Epstein, 68, American pediatric neurosurgeon who developed new ways of operating on tumors, melanoma.
- Abdel Moneim Madbouly, 84, Egyptian comedian and playwright, congestive heart failure.
- Jack Maddox, 86, American basketball player.
- Ireneusz Paliński, 74, Polish weightlifter and Olympian (1960, 1964).
- Teppo Salmisaari, 82, Finnish Olympic canoeist (1952).
- Alan Senitt, 27, British political activist, stabbed.
- George Hopkins Williams II, 91, American aviation historian.
- Milan Williams, 58, American keyboardist, founding member of R&B/funk band the Commodores, cancer.
- Michael Zinzun, 57, American ex-Black Panthers and anti-police activist.

=== 10 ===
- Shamil Basayev, 41, Chechen rebel leader and terrorist, explosion.
- Lennart Bladh, 86, Swedish politician, member of the Riksdag from 1974 to 1985.
- Tommy Bruce, 68, British singer ("Ain't Misbehavin'").
- Ángel Fleitas, 91, Cuban baseball player (Washington Senators).
- Robert Fumerton, 93, Canadian night fighter ace top-scorer of World War II.
- Raymond Furnell, 71, British Dean of York from 1994 to 2003, cancer.
- Georges Panisset, 76, French Olympic alpine skier (1948).
- Ahmad Nadeem Qasmi, 89, Pakistani Urdu poet, writer, critic and journalist who published 50 books.
- Ruth Schönthal, 82, German-born classical pianist and composer.
- Simion Surdan, 66, Romanian footballer.
- Fred Wander, 89, Austrian author and Holocaust survivor.
- Notable people killed in the crash of Pakistan International Airlines Flight 688:
  - Mohammed Naseer Khan, 64-65, Pakistani physicist and academic administrator, Vice-Chancellor of Bahauddin Zakariya University (since 2005)
  - Muhammad Nawaz Bhatti, 57, Pakistani judge and lawyer

=== 11 ===
- Kathy Augustine, 50, American politician, State Controller of Nevada who was first Nevada state official to be impeached in office, murdered.
- Bengt Backlund, 80, Swedish canoeist and Olympian (1952).
- Phyllis Baker, 69, American baseball player (Battle Creek Belles, Muskegon Belles, South Bend Blue Sox).
- John Coletta, 74, English music manager (Deep Purple, Whitesnake) and producer.
- Dick Dunn, 85, Australian rugby league footballer.
- Gerald Gidwitz, 99, American cosmetics executive, co-founder of Helene Curtis, congestive heart failure.
- Barnard Hughes, 90, American actor (Tron, Doc Hollywood, The Lost Boys), Tony winner (1978).
- Fortunato Libanori, 72, Italian motorcycle road racer.
- Bill Miller, 91, American pianist, heart attack.
- Derrick O'Brien, 31, American convicted murderer, execution by lethal injection.
- Bronwyn Oliver, 47, Australian sculptor, suicide.
- John Spencer, 70, British snooker player, stomach cancer.
- Philippe Takla, 91, Lebanese politician, lawyer and diplomat, foreign minister of Lebanon.
- Wiarton Willie, 8, Canadian Groundhog Day prognosticator.

=== 12 ===
- Rocky Barton, 49, American convicted murderer, execution by lethal injection.
- Kurt Kreuger, 89, Swiss-German actor (Sahara, The Enemy Below), stroke.
- Hubert Lampo, 85, Belgian writer.
- Diego Marabelli, 92, Italian cyclist.
- Loredana Nusciak, 64, Italian actress (Django, Ten Thousand Dollars for a Massacre) and model.
- Alfons Olszewski, 90, Polish Olympic sailor (1936).
- Jorma Pilkevaara, 60, Finnish basketball player and Olympian (1964).

=== 13 ===
- Red Buttons, 87, American comedian and actor (Sayonara, The Longest Day, Pete's Dragon), Oscar winner (1958), vascular disease.
- Pamela Cooper, 95, British refugee activist known for her work with the Palestinians.
- John Lyttelton, 11th Viscount Cobham, 63, British aristocrat.
- Harold Gallop, 96, Canadian Olympic middle-distance runner (1932).
- Ángel Suquía Goicoechea, 89, Spanish Metropolitan-Archbishop of Madrid.
- Jacques Thieffry, 82, French Olympic field hockey player (1948, 1952).
- Frank Williams, 74, American football player (Los Angeles Rams).
- Tomasz Zaliwski, 76, Polish actor.

=== 14 ===
- Anthony Cave Brown, 77, English historian of espionage.
- Tom Frame, 74-75, British comic book letterer (Judge Dredd), cancer.
- Heinrich Heidersberger, 100, German photographer.
- William H. Lash, 45, American assistant secretary of the U.S. Department of Commerce and professor at George Mason University, suicide by gunshot.
- John Novotny, 88, American basketball player.
- Carrie Nye, 69, American actress (Half a Sixpence, Guiding Light, Creepshow), lung cancer.
- Len Teeuws, 79, American football player (Los Angeles Rams, Chicago Cardinals).
- Aleksander Wojtkiewicz, 43, Polish International Grandmaster of chess, perforated intestine and bleeding.

=== 15 ===
- John Joseph Fitzpatrick, 87, Canadian Bishop of Brownsville for 20 years.
- Alfred Gerdes, 89, German Olympic field hockey player (1936).
- Howdy Groskloss, 100, American professional baseball player (Pittsburgh Pirates), oldest major league baseball player.
- Kenneth Lochhead, 80, Canadian artist who was a member of the Regina Five, colorectal cancer.
- James Nicholas, 85, American orthopedic surgeon and physician for three NFL teams.
- István Pálfi, 39, Hungarian Member of the European Parliament.
- Rupert Pole, 87, American actor, forest ranger, and co-husband of bigamist Anaïs Nin.
- Francis Rose, 84, British botanist.
- Andrée Ruellan, 101, American painter.
- Alireza Shapour Shahbazi, 63, Iranian archaeologist, stomach cancer.
- Andrew Sudduth, 44, American rower and Olympian (1984, 1988), pancreatic cancer.

=== 16 ===
- Don Barton, 76, American football player (Texas Longhorns, Green Bay Packers).
- Walter Binaghi, 87, Argentine ICAO Council President.
- Robert H. Brooks, 69, American chairman of Hooters of America, natural causes.
- Keith DeVries, 69, American archaeologist at the University of Pennsylvania, excavated Gordion.
- Kevin Hughes, 53, British Labour MP for Doncaster North, motor neurone disease.
- José Pérez Llácer, 79, Spanish cyclist.
- Gabriel Ogando, 84, Argentine footballer.
- Bob Orton, 76, American professional wrestler, heart attack.
- Destiny Norton, 5, American child, murdered.
- Gramoz Pashko, 51, Albanian economist and politician, Deputy Prime Minister (1991), helicopter crash.
- Ossi Reichert, 80, German alpine skier, and Olympian (1952, 1956).
- Winthrop Paul Rockefeller, 57, American billionaire and Lieutenant Governor of Arkansas since 1996, myeloproliferative disorder.
- Emil Šmatlák, 90, Czech Olympic canoeist (1936).
- Malachi Thompson, 56, American jazz trumpeter, lymphoma.

=== 17 ===
- Setsuro Ebashi, 83, Japanese physiologist.
- Galen Fiss, 75, American football player (Cleveland Browns).
- Keith LeClair, 40, American college baseball coach, complications from amyotrophic lateral sclerosis.
- Barbara Liebrich, 83, American baseball player (Rockford Peaches, Kenosha Comets).
- Robert Mardian, 82, American Republican party official, attorney for Richard Nixon, figure in the Watergate scandal, lung cancer.
- Sam Myers, 70, American blues musician, who won nine W.C. Handy Awards with his band the Rockets, throat cancer.
- Mickey Spillane, 88, American author (Mike Hammer), pancreatic cancer.
- Reg Turnbull, 98, Australian politician.

=== 18 ===
- Raul Cortez, 73, Brazilian actor, pancreatic cancer.
- Henry Hewes, 89, American Saturday Review theater critic and editor of Best Plays (1960–1964).
- Jimmy Leadbetter, 78, Scottish Ipswich Town footballer.
- David Maloney, 72, British television director and producer for Doctor Who and Blake's 7.
- Sir James Menter, 84, British physicist.
- V. P. Sathyan, 41, Indian football player, captain of the India national football team, suicide by train.
- Jean Pambrun, 76, French rugby union and rugby league player (national team).
- Billy Rayner, 71, Australian rugby league player (Parramatta Eels, national team).

=== 19 ===
- Randy Clay, 78, American football player (Texas Longhorns, New York Giants).
- Pat Davey, 93, Australian footballer (Richmond).
- Ulli Jansen, 75, German Olympic ice hockey player (1956, 1960, 1964).
- Mohammad Yunus Khalis, 87, Afghan mujahideen leader.
- Sam Neely, 57, American singer-songwriter.
- Milorad Popović, 27, Serbian footballer.
- Jack Warden, 85, American actor (Shampoo, 12 Angry Men, Being There), Emmy winner (1972), heart and kidney failure.
- George Wetherill, 80, American astrophysicist, winner of the National Medal of Science.
- Tudi Wiggins, 70, Canadian-born American actor, cancer.

=== 20 ===
- Ugo Attardi, 83, Italian painter, sculptor and writer.
- Charles Bettelheim, 92, French Marxist economist and historian.
- Benoît Chabot, 95, Canadian politician, member of the House of Commons of Canada (1957-1958).
- Robert Cornthwaite, 89, American character actor (Thing From Another World).
- Paddy Dunne, 77, Irish politician, Lord Mayor of Dublin (1975–1976) and senator.
- Ted Grant, 93, South African-British Trotskyist politician.
- Brandon Hedrick, 27, American convicted murderer and rapist, execution by electric chair.
- Lim Kim San, 89, Singaporean politician, cabinet minister of Singapore.
- Frank Nabarro, 90, English-born South African physicist who was a pioneer of solid state physics.
- Gérard Oury, 87, French actor, screenwriter and film director.

=== 21 ===
- Jackson Fear, 28, Australian Olympic archer (1996).
- Mako, 72, Japanese-born American actor (The Sand Pebbles, Conan the Barbarian, Avatar: The Last Airbender), esophageal cancer.
- Ta Mok, 80, Cambodian military chief, Khmer Rouge commander.
- J. Madison Wright Morris, 21, American child actress (Earth 2, Shiloh, The Warlord: Battle for the Galaxy), heart attack.
- Alexander Petrenko, 30, Russian international basketballer, traffic collision.
- Breda Pogorelec, 78, Slovenian linguist.
- Raimondo Prinoth, 61, Italian luger and Olympian (1968).
- Gianmario Roveraro, 70, Italian banker and founder of Akros Finanziaria, murder.
- Pons Saldaña, 77, Filipino basketball player and Olympian (1952).
- Bert Slater, 70, Scottish footballer.

=== 22 ===
- Heather Bratton, 19, American model, traffic collision.
- Donald Reid Cabral, 83, Dominican politician and lawyer, foreign minister of the Dominican Republic.
- José Antonio Delgado, 41, Venezuelan mountaineer, first Venezuelan to climb Mount Everest, while mountaineering.
- Gianfrancesco Guarnieri, 71, Italian-Brazilian actor, complications from kidney disease.
- Jessie Mae Hemphill, 82, American blues musician, complications from an infection.
- Ans Koning, 83, Dutch javelin thrower and Olympian (1948).
- Thomas J. Manton, 73, American longtime Democratic leader of Queens, NY, former US Representative (1985–99), prostate cancer.
- Sergio Marelli, 80, Italian Olympic basketball player (1952).
- Dika Newlin, 82, American musician and musicologist, scholar of Arnold Schoenberg.
- Charles Knox Robinson, 74, American actor, from complications of Parkinson's disease.
- James E. West, 55, American politician, mayor of Spokane, Washington, colorectal cancer.
- Russell J. York, 84, American World War II veteran and hero of the battle for the Hurtgen Forest.

=== 23 ===
- Charles E. Brady Jr., 54, American former astronaut (STS-78).
- Jean-Paul Desbiens, 79, French-Canadian author of Les insolences du Frère Untel, heart attack.
- James Callan Graham, 91, American lawyer and politician.
- Vernon Grant, 71, American cartoonist.
- Besby Holmes, 88, US Air Force fighter pilot, participant in air action that killed Admiral Yamamoto.
- John Mack, 78, American oboist, complications from brain cancer.
- Frederick Mosteller, 89, American Harvard professor of statistics, founding chair of the department of statistics, sepsis.
- Terence Otway, 92, British soldier, commander of the assault on the Merville Battery on D-Day.

=== 24 ===
- Eleanore Bäumel, 88, Austrian Olympic figure skater (1936).
- Lalka Berberova, 41, Bulgarian rower and Olympian (1988, 1992).
- Janka Bryl, 89, Belarusian writer.
- Heinrich Hollreiser, 93, German conductor.
- Bill Long, 88, Canadian ice hockey coach.
- Leon Morris, 92, Australian theologian.

=== 25 ===
- Carl Brashear, 75, American Navy diver, heart failure.
- Ezra Fleischer, 78, Romanian-born Israeli poet, winner of the Israel Prize, and professor at Hebrew University.
- Hani Mohsin Hanafi, 41, Malaysian actor and television game show host, heart attack.
- Aldo Notari, 73, Italian basketball executive, president of the International Baseball Federation.
- Dame Mildred Riddelsdell, 92, British civil servant.
- Bob Simpson, 61, British journalist (BBC).
- Kalervo Toivonen, 93, Finnish Olympic javelin thrower (1936).

=== 26 ===
- Floyd Dixon, 77, American R&B pianist, kidney failure.
- Vincent J. Fuller, 75, American lawyer who defended John Hinckley Jr., lung cancer.
- Jessie Gilbert, 19, British chess player, youngest Women's World Amateur Championship winner, fall.
- Rolf Arthur Hansen, 86, Norwegian government minister.
- Roi Klein, Israeli IDF Major, won Medal of Courage.
- Darrell Martinie, 63, American astrologer, cancer.
- Tatiana von Metternich-Winneburg, 91, Russian-born German aristocrat, World War II diarist, and arts patron.
- Alf Opheim, 86, Norwegian Olympic alpine skier (1948, 1952).

=== 27 ===
- Maryann Mahaffey, 81, American member of Detroit city council, leukemia.
- Sir Charles Mills, 91, British admiral.
- Phil Odle, 63, American football player (BYU Cougars, Detroit Lions).
- Wally Paterson, 78, Australian Olympic wrestler (1956).
- Carlos Roque, 70, Portuguese comic book artist.
- Alexandru Șafran, 95, Romanian and Swiss rabbi, Chief Rabbi of Romania who tried to stop the deportation of Jews by the pro-Nazi regime during World War II.
- Elisabeth Volkmann, 70, German actress, German voice of Marge Simpson.
- Johnny Weissmuller Jr., 65, American actor, son of Johnny Weissmuller, liver cancer.
- Funsho Williams, 58, Nigerian politician, strangled.

=== 28 ===
- Patrick Allen, 79, British actor.
- Rupert Blöch, 77, Austrian Olympic sprinter (1952).
- Rut Brandt, 86, Norwegian resistance fighter, second wife of former German chancellor Willy Brandt.
- Nigel Cox, 55, New Zealand novelist, cancer.
- Abdallah Isaaq Deerow, 56, Somali politician, Constitution and Federalism Minister of Somalia, assassination by gunshot.
- Harold Leroy Enarson, 87, American academic, president of Ohio State University (1972–1981), fired football coach Woody Hayes, hydrocephalus.
- David Gemmell, 57, British fantasy novelist.
- Joel Hedgpeth, 94, American marine biologist and environmental activist.
- Richard Mock, 61, American painter, sculptor, and editorial cartoonist.
- Sep Smith, 94, English footballer (Leicester City).
- Billy Walsh, 85, Irish football player (Manchester City) and manager (Grimsby Town).

=== 29 ===
- Hani Awijan, 29, Palestinian leader of Palestinian Islamic Jihad's military wing, The Al-Quds brigades, in Nablus, West Bank, gunshot wounds.
- Guido Daccò, 63, Italian racing driver, who competed in Formula 3000, 24 Hours of Le Mans, & Champ Car.
- José López Rosario, 30, Puerto Rican drug dealer.
- Jean Baker Miller, 78, American psychiatrist.
- Jim Olin, 86, American politician, member of the United States House of Representatives (1982–1992).
- Pierre Vidal-Naquet, 76, French historian and activist, cerebral haemorrhage.

=== 30 ===
- Duygu Asena, 60, Turkish writer and civil-rights advocate, brain tumour.
- Al Balding, 82, Canadian golfer, cancer.
- Murray Bookchin, 85, American author, heart failure.
- Philip D'Arcy Hart, 106, British medical researcher.
- Stefan Dziedzic, 78, Polish Olympic skier (1948, 1952).
- Anthony Galla-Rini, 102, American concert accordionist, heart failure.
- Akbar Mohammadi, 37, Iranian student dissident, heart attack following a hunger strike and torture.
- Zdravko Rajkov, 78, Serbian football player, manager, and Olympian (1952).

=== 31 ===
- José Eugenio Acosta, 62, Argentine Olympic equestrian (1968, 1972).
- Vladimír Bouzek, 85, Czech ice hockey player, footballer, and Olympian (1948).
- Dugald Christie, 65, Canadian lawyer who fought for equitable access to legal services, traffic collision.
- Emilio Cueche, 78, Venezuelan baseball player.
- Simón Echeverría, 34, Chilean record producer, pancreatic cancer.
- Paul Eells, 70, American sportscaster, voice of the Arkansas Razorbacks football and basketball for radio and television, traffic collision.
- Mario Faustinelli, 81, Italian comic book artist.
- Shohei Kaneko, 68, Japanese Olympic discus thrower (1964).
- Fred Kilgour, 92, American librarian, founder of OCLC Online Computer Library Center.
- Pascal Miézan, 47, Ivorian footballer.
- Donald Troy, 79, American baseball player.
