= Wasserman (disambiguation) =

Wasserman or Wassermann is a surname.

Wasserman or Wassermann may also refer to:

- Wasserman (company), marketing and talent agency
- Jakob-Wassermann-Literaturpreis, a Bavarian literary prize
- Toppo Wassermann College, a boarding school in Udine, Italy
- Wasserman 9-Panel Plot, a graphical representation of cardiopulmonary exercise testing data
- Wasserman radar, a long-range, height finder radar built by Germany during World War II
- Wassermann Lake, a lake in Minnesota, United States
- Wassermann test, a complement-fixation antibody test for syphilis, named after August von Wassermann
- Wasserman, children's book by Yoram Kaniuk about a stray dog named Wasserman
- Wasserman, 1995 film with screenplay by Peter Lilienthal based on Kaniuk's book
