= Sleepy's =

Defunct American mattress retailer

Sleepy's, LLC
- Company type: Public company
- Traded as: Nasdaq: MFRM
- Industry: Retail
- Founded: February 4, 1931; 95 years ago (as Bedding Discount Centers)
- Founders: Louis Acker; Harry Acker
- Defunct: January 1, 2017; 9 years ago (retail stores only)
- Fate: Acquired by Mattress Firm, stores rebranded under Mattress Firm name
- Successor: Mattress Firm (retail stores only)
- Headquarters: Hicksville, New York, United States
- Products: Mattresses, bedding
- Brands: Sealy, Serta, Simmons, Tempur-Pedic, Stearns and Foster, Beautyrest, Spring Air, King Koil, Ortho-Posture
- Parent: Steinhoff International (Mattress Firm Inc.)
- Website: www.sleepys.com Archived 2016-12-29 at the Wayback Machine

Sleepy's, LLC, was a retail mattress chain with over 1,000 stores, primarily situated in the northeastern United States. The company was founded in New York City in 1931. Sleepy's was acquired by Mattress Firm in December 2015 and all stores were rebranded under the Mattress Firm name on January 1, 2017, but the website continued as an online retailer until 2018. Mattress Firm now uses the Sleepy's name for their private label mattresses.

== Business history ==
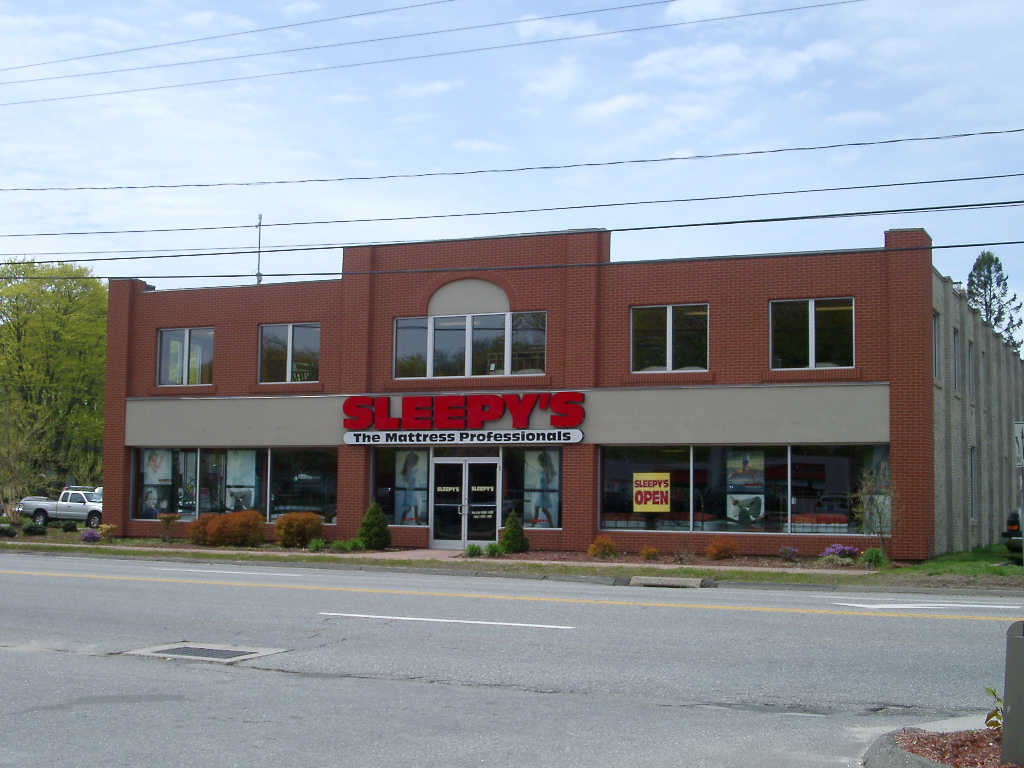
A Sleepy's store in Old Saybrook, Connecticut

In the mid-1920s, Louis Acker left Austria and worked in France. He learned how to hand tie and make mattresses. He left France on the SS Rochambeau, which was a French transatlantic ocean liner of the Compagnie Générale Transatlantique. In 1931, Louis Acker opened his first mattress store in Brooklyn. Louis had 4 sons: Harry, Melvyn, Lenny and Jack. In 1955, Louis died suddenly from a heart attack. Harry and Melvyn took over The Bedding Discount Center. Eventually Lenny and Jack also worked there. The business was incorporated in 1957 as Bedding Discount Center. Harry branched out on his own and in 1975 the chain was renamed to Sleepy's. In 1977, Sleepy's opened its eighth store and relocated its corporate offices and warehouse to a 20,000-square-foot (1,900 m^{2}) space in New Hyde Park. In 1986, it relocated its headquarters and distribution center to a 60,000-square-foot (5,600 m^{2}) building in Port Washington, New York. In 1993 Sleepy's acquired Kleinsleep and in 1996 Mattress Discounters in New York and New Jersey. In 1994, the 75th store opened and the corporate headquarters and distribution center moved to Bethpage, New York in a 150,000-square-foot (14,000 m^{2}) building that was expanded in 1995 to 80,000 square feet (7,400 m^{2}).

David Acker, Harry's son, became the president of Sleepy's in 2001. In 2002, Sleepy's built a new 211,000-square-foot (19,600 m^{2}) warehouse in Robbinsville, New Jersey. Mattress Firm sleep chains locations in Connecticut and Massachusetts were acquired in 2003, and in 2007 Sleepy's acquired the Rockaway Bedding chain, adding 138 stores. In the summer of 2009, Sleepy's moved its headquarters and New York distribution facility to a newly constructed 500,000-square-foot (46,000 m2) building in Hicksville, New York. In 2009, Sleepy's acquired the assets of Dial-A-Mattress International and 1-800-Mattress Corp., including its two domain names, and a year later the Connecticut mattress specialty chain Better Bedding. In 2013, Sleepy's expanded into the Chicago market. In October 2014 Sleepy's opened its 1,000th store.

Their mascot, the Sleepy's man in a red and white night shirt and cap, was introduced in 1976. In 1978 the first televised Sleepy's commercial starring President Harry Acker aired. In 2009, the company launched their e-commerce website.

=== Acquisition by Mattress Firm and rebranding ===
In December 2015, Sleepy's announced that it was being acquired by competitor Mattress Firm (MFRM) for $780 million. Sleepy's stores were slowly rebranded as Mattress Firm throughout 2016, the last of them completed this process by January 1, 2017. Until 2018, Sleepy's continued to exist as an online retailer. Mattress Firm eventually reused the Sleepy's name for their own brand of mattresses.

On October 5, 2018, Mattress Firm filed for Chapter 11 bankruptcy protection and announced to close up to 500-700 stores, which included former Sleepy's stores that are close proximity to a nearby Mattress Firm store. In November 2018, the company had emerged from bankruptcy.

== Business operations ==
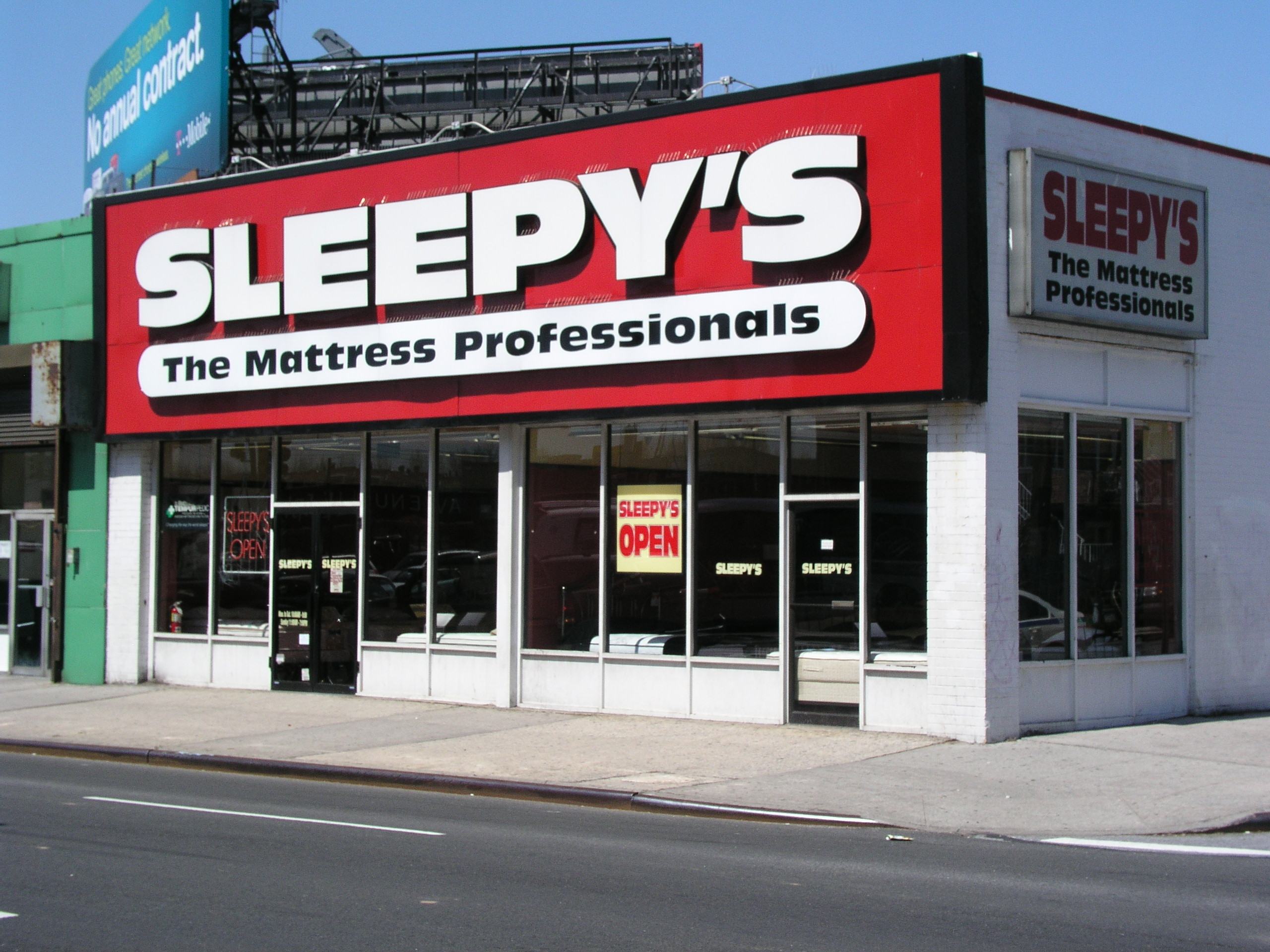
A Sleepy's store in Brooklyn, New York, opened in 1975

Sleepy's carried mattress brands including Sealy, Serta, Simmons, Beautyrest, Posturepedic, Tempur-Pedic, King Koil, and Stearns & Foster. Like other major retailers, Sleepy's carried mattress lines that were unique to the seller, so there was no way to compare prices with their competitors.

Sleepy's stores were located primarily in the Northeastern, Mid-Atlantic and the Midwest, including Connecticut, Delaware, District of Columbia, Illinois, Indiana, Maine, Massachusetts, Maryland, New Hampshire, New Jersey, New York, North Carolina, Pennsylvania, Rhode Island, South Carolina, Virginia, Vermont, and West Virginia. Oftentimes, stores would be located close to or nearby of other Sleepy's stores. Nationwide delivery was available through their official website.

In 2009, a trade publication labeled Sleepy's as the fastest-growing furniture retailer in the US and in 2014 ranked them 11th in growth.

== Complaints ==
In 2004, Sleepy's resolved a lawsuit filed by the New Jersey division of consumer affairs. The lawsuit alleged that Sleepy's misled consumers regarding their exchange policy, customer refunds, and advertisements. There were also questions about delivery of faulty merchandise and failure of delivery. Sleepy's agreed to pay $750,000 in costs and restitution to reach settlement. In addition to the payment the company agreed to clearer advertising, issuing refunds more willingly and improving customer service.

In 2007, Sleepy's agreed to pay $200,000 to resolve complaints and settle deceptive sales charges in New York. As part of the settlement, Sleepy's agreed to pay a total of $200,000, which includes restitution to consumers and penalties, as well as a commitment to new policies and procedures to achieve full compliance with local and state laws. The settlement marked a conclusion to the agency's extensive investigation into approximately 300 consumer complaints filed over the previous three years through DCA or referred to the department by other agencies including the New York State Attorney General's Office and the Better Business Bureau.

In April 2011 Sleepy's was cleared by Connecticut Attorney General George Jepsen of charges regarding complaints of bed bug infestations and accusations of reselling used mattresses.

In 2014, Sleepy's was ranked last of 15 major mattress retailers listed in a poll of Consumer Reports readers, the same result it had reported in its 2012 rankings. The 2014 ranking was based on 6,105 shopping experiences.
