= Wasserman =

- Aaron E. Wasserman (1920–2015), American food scientist
- Aharon Wasserman (born 1986), American entrepreneur and software designer
- Al Wasserman (1921–2005), American documentary filmmaker, television producer, and photographer
- Anatoly Wasserman (born 1952), Russian journalist and political pundit
- Antony Wassermann (born 1957), British mathematician
- August von Wassermann (1866–1925), German bacteriologist
- Bob Wasserman (1934–2011), American politician and police chief, Mayor of Fremont, California
- Cale Wassermann (born 1983), American soccer coach
- Casey Wasserman (born 1974), American entertainment executive and owner of the Los Angeles Avengers
- Dale Wasserman (1914–2008), American playwright
- Dan Wasserman, American political cartoonist
- Dave Wasserman (born 1984), American political analyst
- Debbie Wasserman Schultz (born 1966), American politician from Florida
- Dora Wasserman (1919–2003), actress and founder of the Dora Wasserman Yiddish Theatre in Montreal
- Edward Wasserman, American professor of psychology at the University of Iowa
- Ehren Wassermann (born 1980), American baseball pitcher
- Elchonon Wasserman (1874–1941), Lithuanian rabbi and rosh yeshiva
- Eva Wasserman-Margolis, American composer, conductor and clarinet player
- Gordon Wasserman, Baron Wasserman (born 1938), member of the UK House of Lords
- Harvey Wasserman (born 1945), American journalist
- Jack Wasserman (1927–1977), Canadian newspaper columnist
- Jakob Wassermann (1873–1934), German writer and novelist
- James Wasserman (1948–2020), American author and occultist
- Jeffrey Wasserman (1946–2006), American artist
- Jerry Wasserman (born 1945), American actor
- John L. Wasserman (1938–1979), American entertainment critic for the San Francisco Chronicle from 1964 – 1979
- Kathryn Wasserman Davis (1907–2013), American philanthropist and foundation executive
- Kevin 'Noodles' Wasserman (born 1963), American lead guitarist and background vocalist for The Offspring
- Kimberly Wasserman, American environmentalist
- Larry A. Wasserman, Canadian statistician
- Lew Wasserman (1913–2002), American film and entertainment agent and studio executive
- Mel Wasserman (1932–2002), American businessman, entrepreneur and founder of CEDU Education
- Noam T. Wasserman, American academic
- Oscar Wassermann (1869–1934), German banker
- Paul Wasserman (1934–2007), American entertainment publicist
- Philip Wasserman (1828–1895), mayor of Portland, Oregon
- Rick D. Wasserman (born 1973), American actor
- Rob Wasserman (1952–2016), American composer and bass player
- Robert Harold Wasserman (1926–2018), professor of veterinary medicine
- Robin Wasserman (born 1978), American novelist
- Ron Wasserman (born 1961), American composer
- Ruth Wasserman Lande (born 1976), Israeli diplomat, lecturer and social activist
- Ryan Jon Wasserman, American philosopher
- Sandra Wasserman (born 1970), Belgian tennis player
- Sheldon Wasserman (born 1961), Wisconsin State Assembly member
- Simcha Wasserman (1899–1992), Rabbi/Educator, founder of several schools (France, USA, Israel)
- Stanley Wasserman (born 1951), American statistician
- Suzanne Wasserman (1957–2017), American film director, historian and writer
- Tony Wasserman, American computer scientist
- Václav Wasserman (1898–1967), Czechoslovak screenwriter, film actor and director
- Walter Wassermann (1883–1944), German screenwriter
- Zbigniew Wassermann (1949–2010), Polish politician
