= Mattress Firm =

American mattress retailer

Mattress Firm, Inc.

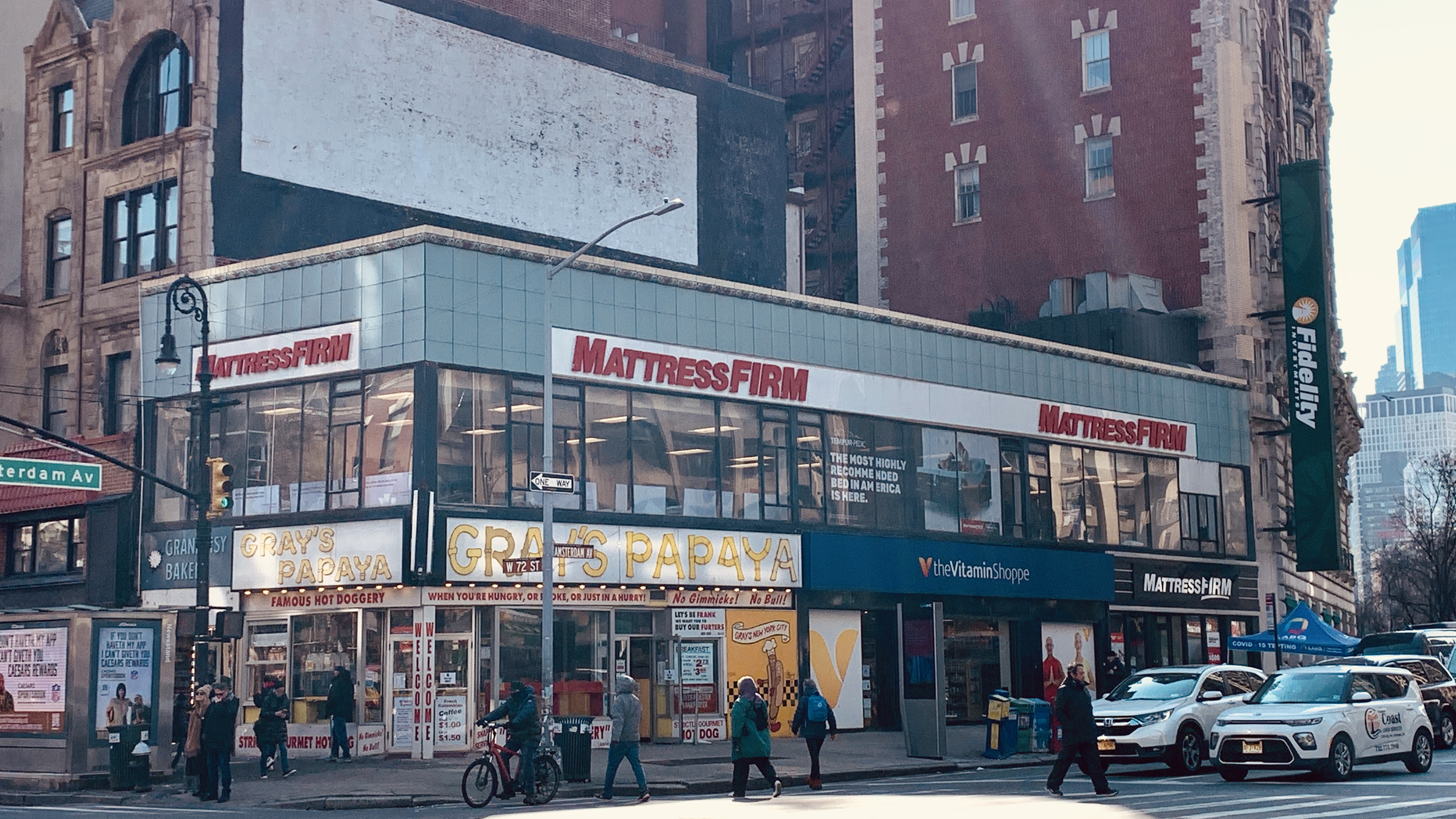
- Mattress Firm Verdi Square in Manhattan in 2022
- Type: Subsidiary
- Traded as: Nasdaq: MFRM
- Industry: Retailer
- Founded: July 4, 1986; 40 years ago
- Founder: Harry Roberts; Paul Stork; Steve Fendrich
- Headquarters: Houston, Texas, U.S.
- Number of locations: 2,300 (2021)
- Key people: Steve Rusing (CEO); John Eck (Former CEO); Steve Stagner (Former CEO)
- Products: Mattresses, bedding
- Brands: Tulo, Sleepy's
- Services: Mattress retailer
- Revenue: $4.39 billion (2021)
- Net income: (-$54.4 million)
- Number of employees: 10,000 (2018)
- Parent: Somnigroup International
- Website: mattressfirm.com

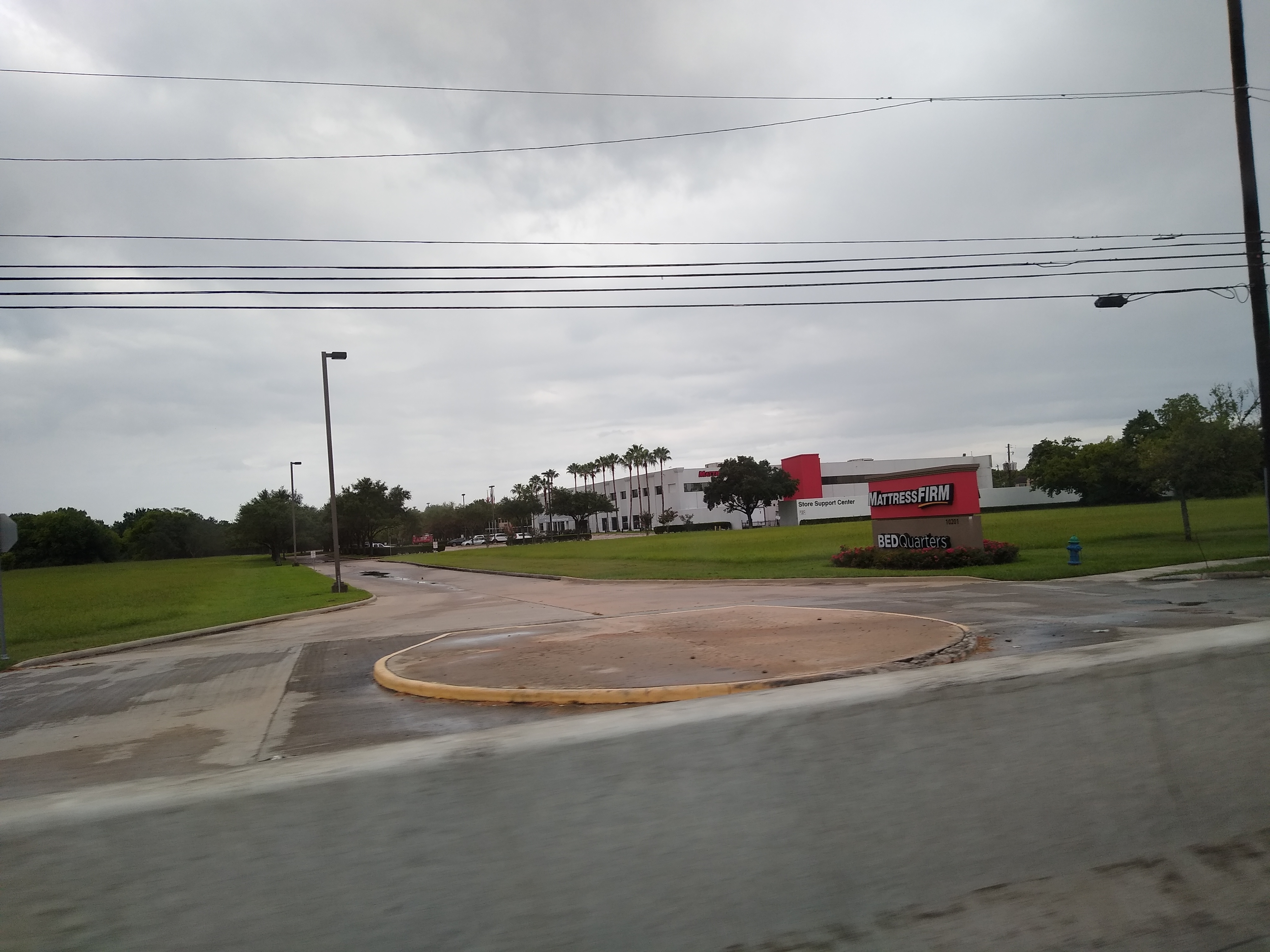
Mattress Firm BEDQuarters, the former corporate headquarters in Houston

Mattress Firm, Inc. is an American mattress store chain founded on July 4, 1986. It became a subsidiary of Somnigroup International in 2025, when it merged with Temper Sealy. The headquarters of the company is located in Houston, Texas.

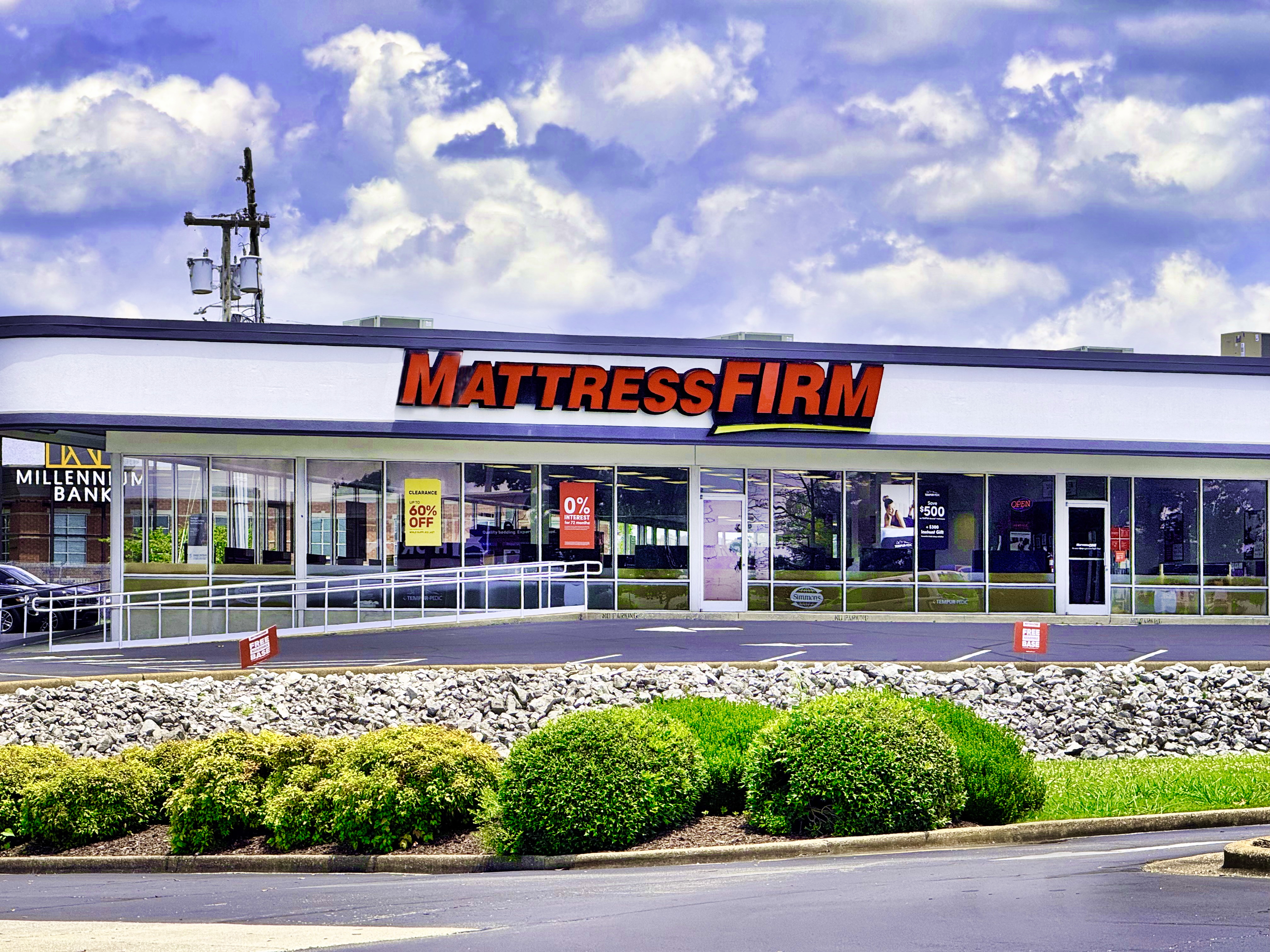
Mattress Firm in Chattanooga, Tennessee

== History ==
=== Founding ===
Mattress Firm was founded by Steve Fendrich, Harry Roberts, and Paul Stork. The three worked for the Houston-based American Bed Co. chain of mattress stores owned by Fendrich's brother-in-law. Roberts moved to New York City in 1984 to lead expansion efforts in Manhattan. Fendrich became comptroller of the company in 1985.

Fendrich, Roberts, and Stork opened the first Mattress Firm in a Houston shopping center on July 4, 1986. Roberts handled advertising and merchandising; Stork was in charge of operations; and Fendrich served as the accountant. They differentiated themselves by allowing customers to test out the beds and offering same-day delivery. Within a year, they had four stores.

The company partnered with Stearns & Foster in 1988, becoming a high-end store by the late '90s. The company also briefly tried selling furniture during this time. By 1999, Mattress Firm had more than 250 stores and $300 million in annual sales.

=== Private equity ===
In October 2002, an affiliate of Sun Capital Partners announced it had acquired ownership of Mattress Firm from a group of investors, including Mattress Holdings International, which was controlled by Sealy and Bain Capital. After the deal, Mattress Firm started carrying other mattress brands.

In January 2007, it was announced that private equity firm J.W. Childs Associates would acquire Mattress Firm from majority shareholder Sun Capital Partners. By July, the company had 355 corporate-owner stores and 45 franchise-owned stores in 32 markets across 19 states. That August, Mattress Firm acquired the mattress retailer Mattress Pro, which operated locations in Texas and Nevada.

=== IPO and expansion ===
The company launched an initial public offering in 2011, with Childs maintaining controlling interest. Mattress Firm then acquired Mattress Giant in May 2012, gaining 180 stores in Texas and Florida. In November 2013, it acquired Mattress People, a five-store chain that operated in Nebraska and Iowa, for $1.8 million. All stores were rebranded as Mattress Firm. The company then purchased a 39-store franchisee that operated in Wisconsin and Illinois for $6.3 million.

In May 2014, the company acquired Mattress King in Colorado and BedMart in Arizona, adding 75 stores to its stable of locations for $35 million. In September, Mattress Firm made two major acquisitions to expand the company nationwide. It purchased the California-based Sleep Train for $425 million, adding 310 stores in California, Washington, Oregon, Idaho, Nevada, and Hawaii. The deal also included the Sleep Country USA, Mattress Discounters, and Got Sleep? names. Separately, Mattress Firm also bought the 135-store Bedding Experts chain for $60 million, establishing the company in Chicago for the first time. The Mattress Barn, Back To Bed, and Bedding Experts names were rebranded as Mattress Firm.

On January 6, 2015, Mattress Firm acquired the 45-store Sleep America for $12.5 million, giving the company 130 locations in Arizona. The four-store Mattress World chain based in Pennsylvania was also acquired. In July 2015, it was announced that Sleep Country USA stores would begin rebranding all of its stores under the Sleep Train name. That month, the company also announced a new partnership with Wayfair to offer same-day delivery on mattresses.

Then, that December, Mattress Firm announced it would buy out its competitor Sleepy's for $780 million. With this purchase, Mattress Firm had expanded to over 3,500 stores. The deal helped Mattress Firm enter Massachusetts, Vermont, New Jersey, Maryland, Connecticut and Rhode Island. Mattress Firm continues to use the Sleepy's name for their brand of mattresses.

=== Purchase by Steinhoff and bankruptcy ===
In August 2016, Steinhoff announced it would purchase Mattress Firm for $3.8 billion, taking the company private and creating the world's largest mattress retail distribution company in the world. At this time, the company had 3,500 stores and 80 distribution centers in 48 states. Steinhoff consolidated its mattress stores under one name. In 2017, the company converted its Sleep Train and Sleepy's locations to the Mattress Firm name.

In January 2017, Steinhoff attempted to renegotiate Mattress Firm's contract with Tempur-Sealy International. However, this ended in Tempur-Sealy terminating the contract and Mattress Firm signing with Serta Simmons instead. Soon after, Tempur-Pedic filed a lawsuit accusing Mattress Firm of selling unauthorized mattresses. In August 2018, it filed another lawsuit accusing the firm of selling copies of Tempur-Pedic products under the lookalike "Therapedic" brand. The lawsuit was settled in February 2019, followed by the resignation of Mattress Firm CEO and Executive Chairman Steve Stagner in April. It wasn't until June 2019 that the two sides reconciled and signed a new contract.

By 2018, the company was the top mattress seller in the industry, yet was seeing declining sales due to competition from online retailers and the loss of revenue from Tempur-Sealy. Another issue was over-expansion. At this point, Mattress Firm had more stores than Big Lots, Michaels, and Williams-Sonoma combined, and three times as much the market share as its competitors. In March 2019, an independent investigation found that from 2009 to 2017 Steinhoff had recorded fictitious or irregular transactions amounting to roughly €6.5 billion. The investigations state that Jooste and other senior executives “made or published statements … that they knew or ought reasonably to have known were false, misleading or deceptive. In March 2024 the South African regulator Financial Sector Conduct Authority (FSCA) fined Jooste R475 million for publishing false or misleading financial statements.Executives, especially Jooste, were able to act with little oversight. Board members and auditors failed to detect—or ignored—red flags. According to forensic reports, some directors signed off on misleading financials without adequate scrutiny. The ultimate cause of Steinhoff International’s downfall was a massive and sustained accounting fraud orchestrated by senior leadership, including former CEO Markus Jooste. This fraud involved fictitious transactions, inflated profits, and false asset values, which significantly overstated the company’s financial health over nearly a decade (2009–2017).

Much of the problem also stemmed from a long-standing real estate scandal at Mattress Firm, where lease agreements for store locations had been inflated. In October 2017, the company filed a lawsuit against two of its real-estate and construction executives, accusing them of taking bribes to sign above-market leases on behalf of the company.

The cancellation of the company's supply agreement with Sealy, plus the costs in litigations and branding that followed, resulted in the firm missing its sales goals by a substantial margin. At the same time, Steinhoff faced its own accounting scandal that saw the conglomerate inflate income and hide the financial situation at Mattress Firm. Steinhoff eventually took a $1.9 billion write down on company.

On October 5, 2018, Mattress Firm filed for Chapter 11 bankruptcy. The company closed 200 unprofitable stores after paying the landlords. In November 2018, Mattress Firm emerged from Chapter 11 bankruptcy after closing 700 stores nationwide and emerged healthy 47 days later.

In 2019, Mattress Firm appointed John Eck as CEO and in March 2020, Mattress Firm was one of several retailers to announce it would not pay some or all of its rent in April due to the effects of COVID-19. In September 2021, the company filed for a confidential IPO. It officially filed an IPO in January 2022, but ultimately withdrew the offering a year later.

In 2023, the company announced it would move its headquarters to Westchase, Houston as the lease at its current headquarters ends. In August 2024, Mattress Firm announced a partnership with DoorDash to provide two-hour delivery from its stores.

=== Purchase by Tempur Sealy ===
In May 2023, Tempur Sealy announced plans to acquire Mattress Firm in a $4 billion merger deal. However, the transaction was blocked by the FTC in July 2024 due to competition concerns related to the deal. That September, Tempur Sealy agreed to sell 73 Mattress Firm locations, its 103-location Sleep Outfitters subsidiary, and seven distribution centers to rival Mattress Warehouse. The company sued the FTC in October to halt the court proceedings and won the case in January 2025, allowing the deal to go through.

The acquisition was finalized in February 2025 and Tempur Sealy changed its name to Somnigroup International Inc. Soon after, John Eck stepped down as CEO of Mattress Firm. Scott Thompson, chairman and CEO of Tempur Sealy, was named interim CEO.
