= Pálfi =

Pálfi is a Hungarian surname. Notable people with the name include:

- Bela Palfi (1923–1995), Yugoslav footballer
- György Pálfi (born 1974), Hungarian film director
- István Pálfi (1966–2006), Hungarian politician
- Judit Pálfi (born 1968), Hungarian wheelchair fencer
- Marion Palfi (1907–1978), German-American photographer
- Róbert Pálfi (born 1974), Hungarian footballer
