= Jordan's IMAX =

Movie theaters in the U.S. state of Massachusetts

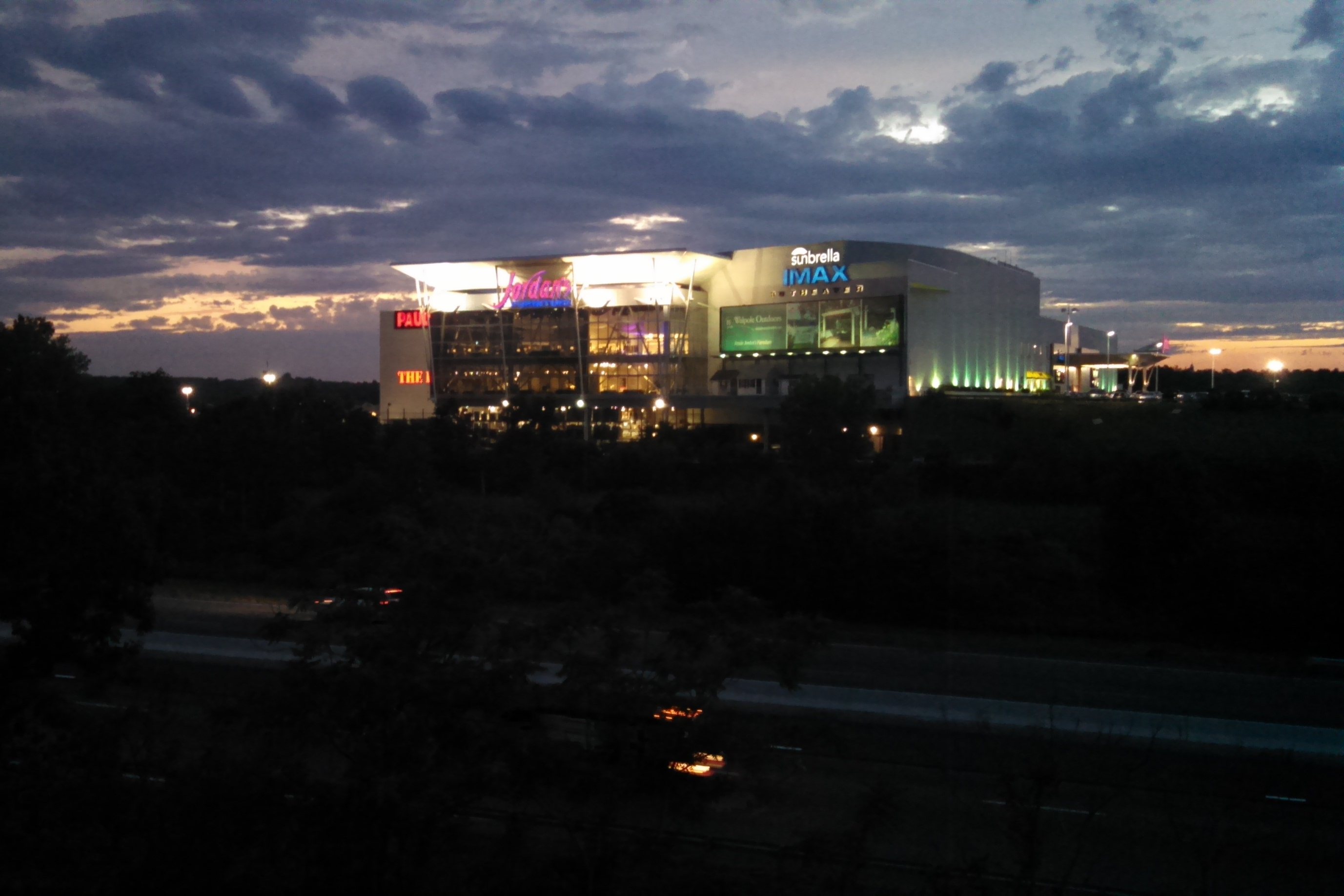
Jordan's IMAX in Reading, Massachusetts

The Jordan's IMAX theaters, also known as the Sunbrella IMAX theaters for sponsorship purposes, are two IMAX theaters located in Jordan's Furniture stores in Natick and Reading, Massachusetts.

== History ==
The IMAX theater in Natick, Massachusetts, opened in August 2002. It features a screen that measures 76 by 55 feet (23 by 17 m), 12,000 watt sound, 279 Tempur-Pedic seats, and digitally remastered Hollywood films.

After the success of the theater in Natick, the company opened their second theater in October 2004 in Reading, Massachusetts, with a seating capacity of 500. The Reading screen measures 80 by 60 feet (24 by 18 m).

In September 2012, both theaters removed their 15/70 Film projectors and replaced them with digital projectors. In September 2015, Reading theater was upgraded to an IMAX with Laser, which uses a "dual 4K laser projection system".

After closing in March 2020 due to the COVID-19 pandemic, the theaters reopened two years later on May 27, 2022, for the release of Top Gun: Maverick.

== Sponsorship ==
The theaters were originally sponsored by Verizon Communications. In April 2011, the sponsorship with Verizon ended, and Tempur-Pedic took over the naming rights. In October 2014, fabric brand Sunbrella was named the new sponsor.
