= Vallario =

Vallario is a surname. Notable people with the surname include:

- Andy Vallario, American jingle writer, musician, and producer
- Joseph F. Vallario Jr. (born 1937), American politician
- Louis Vallario (born 1942), American mobster
- Nicole Vallario (born 2001), Swiss ice hockey player
