= Joseph Shapotshnick =

- יוסף שאפאטשניק
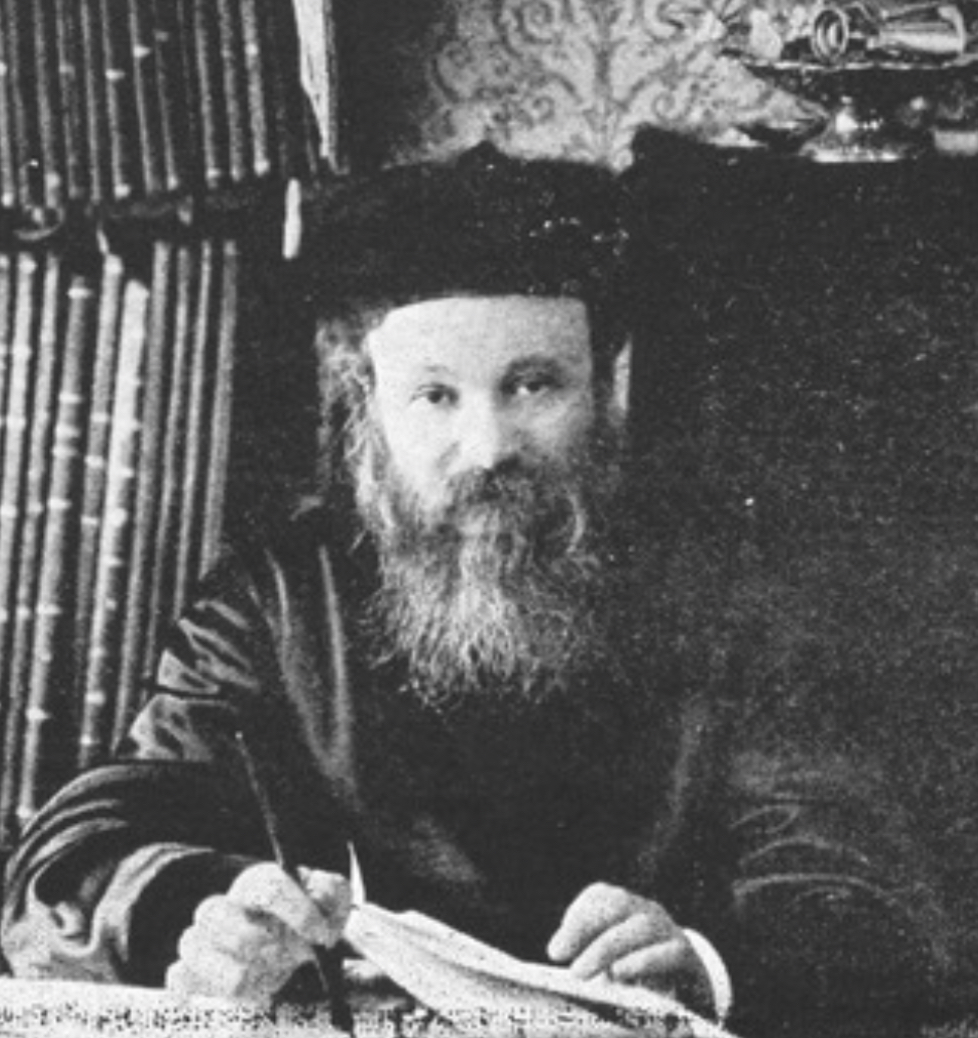
- Rabbi Joseph Shapotshnick

Personal life
- Born: 1882 Chișinău, Bessarabia Governorate, Russian Empire
- Died: 21 October 1937 London, England
- Resting place: Adath Yisroel Cemetery, Enfield
- Spouse: Chaya-Gitl
- Children: Louis "Levi"
- Known for: Shas ha-gadol she-bi-gedolim, controversial agunot rulings
- Occupation: Rabbi, posek, author, social activist

Religious life
- Religion: Judaism
- Denomination: Orthodox Judaism

Rabbi Joseph Shapotshnick (Hebrew: יוסף שפוצ׳ניק; Yiddish: יוסף שאפוטשניק; 1882–1937) was a rabbi, posek, and social activist in early-20th century London. A prolific author of both Hebrew and English sefarim, Shapotshnick was particularly well-known for his controversial rulings regarding agunot. These rulings prompted Rabbi Hayyim Grodzinski to decry him as a "madman" (Hebrew: המטורף), and drew significant opposition from the orthodox religious establishment of his day. In the opinion of Harry Rabinowicz, a noted scholar of Hassidism, Shapotshnick was "one of the best known and most controversial Jewish clerics of his generation."

== Biography ==
Joseph Shapotshnick was born in 1882 in Chişinău, the capital of Bessarabia Governorate within the Russian Empire. He had an older half-brother, Samuel, who would found the United States Bedding Company in 1898. According to Harry Rabinowicz, Shapotshnick's father, Yehuda Leib, was known locally as the "Belsitzer Rebbe;" Eitam Henkin, however, contested this, arguing that Yehuda Leib was instead an Amshinov Hassid. In his youth, Shapotshnick primarily conversed in Yiddish. (Note: Religious Jews traditionally revere Hebrew as the loshn koydesh, a holy tongue reserved chiefly for religious or liturgical occasions. See Aberbach, David. "The Embrace of the Rosebush: Anti-Hebraism in Modern Jewish Literature," International Fiction Review 34, no. 1 (2007): 92, https://journals.lib.unb.ca/index.php/IFR/article/view/4228.)

After his father's death in 1896, the young Shapotshnick moved to Odessa, where his widowed mother, Chava, lived. Here, according to W. D. Rubinstein, he attended the local university, studying psychology, Greek philosophy, and traditional Judaic subjects. He was taught by the dayan Abraham Joel Abelson, who would later refer to Shapotshnick as "beloved to my heart". He appears to have excelled in his rabbinic studies, as the Maharsham described him as: "...well-versed in Torah, and the gates of halakhic ruling are open before him."

In 1913, shortly after marrying a woman named Chaya-Gitl, Shapotshnick moved to the East End of London. Just over a year later, his attempt to convene a rabbinical conference to raise funds for European war refugees met with little success. Following World War I, Shapotshnick began editing his most famous project, Shas ha-gadol she-bi-gedolim—an ambitious, comprehensive edition of the Talmud, intended to incorporate thousands of rabbinic commentaries. He printed a sample on tractate Berakhot in 1921, followed by a 1923 supplement. The 1921 sample was the largest individual Talmud ever published, and possibly one of the earliest rabbinic works to reference the atom, though the full edition never materialised.

A persistent critic of the Anglo-Jewish establishment, Shapotshnick heavily protested its neglect of East End immigrants' welfare. To ease their hardship, Shapotshnick established his own educational programs, and oversaw a regulatory agency to supply East End residents with kosher food. In his later years, Shapotshnick also attempted to create his own eruv; he made little headway with the project.

On 21 October 1937, Shapotshnick suddenly died in London. He was initially denied burial, owing to his controversial reputation, until the newly-established Adath Yisrael community agreed to inter him at their Enfield cemetery. In exchange, they had Shapotshnick's only son, Louis, agree to renounce his father's controversial ideas. The funeral took place on 25 October 1937, with 5,000 people—mostly lower-class beneficiaries of the rabbi's activism—attendant. His obituary in The Jewish Chronicle read: "The enmities a man excites in his lifetime are best buried in his grave.”

== Agunot scandal ==
From the mid-1920s, Shapotshnick offered to help agunot—women unable to obtain a Jewish divorce, and therefore barred from remarrying—resolve their marital status. Although it is unclear whether any of these women remarried, critics argued that his dispensations were halakhically invalid, meaning any children from a subsequent marriage would be considered mamzerim (illegitimate) under Jewish law. In 1927, the head of the London bet din, Rabbi Shmuel Yitzchak Hillman, appealed to the Chofetz Chaim and other prominent rabbis to stop Shapotshnick from issuing the dispensations. In the ensuing controversy, it emerged that Shapotshnick had forged the signatures of several colleagues on his rulings without their consent. Those rabbis publicly distanced themselves from him in the London Yiddish press, and in late 1928, the rabbinical association of Poland published a booklet signed by 600 rabbis condemning his actions.

== Rabbinic controversies ==
On 30 June 1924, Jacob Israël de Haan, an anti-Zionist Dutch Jewish writer, was assassinated by the Haganah. The event provoked widespread rabbinic discussion regarding Zionism, with Shapotshnick assuming a decisive role in the Anglo-Jewish side of the conversation. He personally eulogised de Haan, praising him as an "ardent Jew who devoted his life to Judaism with enormous sacrifice and commitment" and as "the best friend any Orthodox rabbi could have ever had".

A few years before de Haan's assassination, Shapotshnick had begun a regular correspondence with Yosef Chaim Sonnenfeld, de Haan's rabbinic mentor. In these letters, Shapotshnick already voiced a pronounced aversion to political Zionism, writing:

"The newspapers of the accursed Zionists and Mizrahists are publishing the most disgusting things, doused in the venom of the primordial snake. I can assure you that I will not remain silent regarding the slurs against Torah scholars."

In spite of his hostility towards Zionism, Shapotshnick had once enjoyed a close friendship with Avraham Isaac Kook, the movement's foremost religious thinker; Kook had even contributed several articles to Shapotshnick's Rashei alfei Yisrael journal. By 1928, however, Kook had joined the transnational rabbinical campaign against Shapotshnick's unauthorised agunot dispensations, and had even described him as "not entirely normal":

"I can inform you that I am familiar with this fellow [Shapotshnick] and his manner of discourse from when I lived in London … and he is a man who is not entirely normal. He constantly strives to make a name for himself. I have not seen his publication [containing his rulings for agunot to remarry], but what [you] sent me is enough for me to understand the [groundless] foundations on which he has based himself. Even before I received your letter I knew about this matter through our [mutual] friend the scholar Rabbi Moshe Mordekhai Epstein [Rosh Yeshiva of the Slabodka yeshiva in Hebron], and afterwards I was shown Shapotshnick’s filthy rag [newspaper], the one that is full of the most repugnant insolences. My heart weeps with grief over this terrible sedition, [and over] our generation [that] has sunk into the depths of audacity and degeneracy."

As a result, their relationship rapidly deteriorated, and Shapotshnick joined the Haredim in decrying Kook's writings:

"The books of Kook are full of emptiness, utter vanity, and apikorsut, and there is also a part of Spinoza in his books."

== Works ==
A remarkably fruitful writer, Shapotshnick produced several rabbinical works across his lifetime, including:

1. Emet ve-tob (Odessa, 1904): In this work, a 22-year old Shapotshnick endeavoured to "bind together, with cords of love (Hos. 11:4), intellectual enlightenment and all goodness, so that they are connected like a peg that will never be moved (Is. 22:23–25)." He critiqued both maskillim and haredim, arguing that while the former claimed to honour their fellow men and the latter claimed to honour God, they in truth honoured neither their fellows nor God.
2. K'dushat Hashem (London, 1918): A lengthy sefer dedicated to the name of God. On the front page, he promised that: "Anyone who reads this book every single day will have the powers of faith and knowledge strengthened within them, and they will merit to enjoy the good fruits and successful blessings of this world, while the principals of faith and knowledge shall endure for them in the World to Come." A Yiddish version was also printed that same year.
3. Tikkun eruv le-shabbat (London, 1932): In this 8-page pamphlet, he contended that the city of London qualified as a karmelis, rather than a true public domain.
4. Yadav rav lo (London, 1931): A very brief sefer dedicated to the verse, Exodus 17:16.
5. Shulḥan ha-gavo‘ah (London, 1916): A multi-part series, laying out the practical details of Jewish law and their immediate applications in daily life.
6. Ḥerut ‘olam (London, 1928) and Liqro la-asirim deror (1929): Pamphlets in which he laid out his proposed solution to iggun, and forged rabbinical signatures.
