= 1800Mattress.com =

Former American bedding retailer headquartered in Hicksville, New York

- Type: Subsidiary
- Industry: Retail
- Founded: 1976
- Founder: Napoleon and Kay Barragan
- Defunct: 2021
- Headquarters: Hicksville, New York, USA
- Products: Bedding
- Parent: Steinhoff International (Mattress Firm)
- Website: Archived official website at the Wayback Machine (archive index)

1800Mattress.com (formerly known as 1-800-Mattress, Dial-A-Mattress and Dial-A-Mattress Operating Corps) was an American bedding retailer headquartered in Hicksville, New York and famous for its ads that used the slogan "leave off the last S for savings" (since the word "mattress" has 8 letters and only 7 are necessary for the phoneword).

== History ==
1800mattress.com was founded as Dial-A-Mattress in 1976 by Ecuadorian immigrant Napoleon Barragan. He and his wife had saved up enough money from working odd jobs and selling Avon products to open a mattress and used-furniture store called College Furniture Discounters next to York College in Jamaica, Queens. Later that year, he saw an advertisement in the newspaper for Dial-A-Steak, a business that sold meat over the telephone, and was inspired to create a similar business model for mattresses.

In 1978, Barragan opened 1-800-Matress with just one employee. He took out advertisements in The Village Voice and New York Post, offering free haul away. In the beginning, the business used the 212 area code. The first Dial-A-Mattress television commercial debuted in 1979 and its toll-free 800 number was first promoted in 1988. The name was changed to 1-800-Mattress to match the familiar "1-800-Mattress" jingle written by Andy Vallario, president and chief creative officer of Media Results, Inc.

Having quickly eclipsed the furniture store where Barragan originally worked, the company went national. It built a network of distributors and partners to sell mattresses across the country and also establish franchise regions in Boston, Philadelphia, South Florida, and New England.

By August 1993, the company had 185 employees and annual sales of $30 million. At the age of 54, Barragan was a millionaire. However, in September 1994, Barragan pled guilty to tax fraud after an audit discovered the company had under-reported the amount of sales taxes it collected from customers. By 1995, the company was making $55 million per year and had over 300 employees. In 1999, 1800mattress.com was launched.

Barragan's son, Luis, was named president and COO in 2002, helping the company move into online sales. In 2005, near the company's peak when it was the leading bedding telemarketing company in the US, 1-800-Mattress had annual sales in excess of $100 million. By this point, it had direct operations in New York, New Jersey, Pennsylvania, Maryland, and Washington, D.C., as well as 400 distribution centers, 44 showrooms, and numerous franchises across the country.

1-800-Mattress announced in March 2007 that it was changing its name to 1800mattress.com to reflect the company's growth in online ordering. At this time, there were 104 retail stores in New York, New Jersey, Connecticut, Maryland and California. In 2008, the company announced plans to open 40 stores in the Washington, D.C. area. Three stores in Manhattan changed their hours of operation to be open 24 hours a day, seven days a week.

By 2009, the company's sales had fallen to below $100 million, down from $170 million two years prior. In March, creditors filed an involuntary Chapter 7 bankruptcy petition against 1-800-Mattress, seeking $1.7 million. In order to avoid liquidating the company, it filed for Chapter 11 bankruptcy protection pending a proposed sale to former rival, Sleepy's. At the time, the company employed more than 350 people across more than 100 locations in New York, New Jersey, California, Connecticut and Maryland. In May, Sleepy's purchased the intellectual property rights to 1800Mattress.com at auction for $25 million.

In 2015, Sleepy's was itself acquired by Mattress Firm for $780 million; Sleepy's retail stores became Mattress Firm, and 1800Mattress.com remained in use for some time. However, the website now redirects to Mattress Firm.

== See also ==
- Dial-A-Mattress Franchise Corp. v. Anthony Page
