= Luis Barragan (executive) =

American businessman

Luis Barragan (September 11, 1971 – July 7, 2006) was an American businessman. He was president of 1-800-Mattress at the time of his death.

== Early life and career ==
Luis grew up in New York City, more specifically in the Jamaica neighbourhood of Queens, and was a product of the Catholic school system. While living in New York, he attended the Presentation-BVM (Elementary) School on Parsons Blvd in Queens and then moved on to St. Francis Preparatory School in Fresh Meadows, NY. Luis graduated with a business degree from St. John's University. He joined 1-800-Mattress in 1992. The company was founded by his father, Napoleon Barragan, in 1976.

He was also vice-chairman of the Better Business Bureau serving Metropolitan New York.

Luis drowned while vacationing with his family in Salisbury, Connecticut, on July 7, 2006. At the time of his death he was married to his wife Leslie, and had three young children.
