= Fagerdala World Foams =

Swedish manufacturer

Fagerdala
- Company type: Manufacturing Company
- Founded: 1964
- Founder: Alf & Dag Landvik
- Headquarters: Singapore
- Products: Polymer Foams
- Website: http://www.fagerdalagroup.com/about-us/

Fagerdala is a company specializing in the development, manufacturing and converting of technical polymer foams, thermoforming parts and resilient materials.

== History ==
The company was founded as Fagerdala World Foams in 1964 by father and son, Alf and Dag Landvik.

The company’s initial products were Polyurethane mattresses and cushions, before expanding into other foam applications.

In 1989, Fagerdala licensed Tempur-Pedic technology from NASA using its visco elastic material in the manufacture of its pressure-relieving mattresses.

During the 1990s, Polypropylene materials were then utilized to make automotive shock-absorbing parts, acquiring an assortment of design patents along the way. The company positioned itself as a polypropylene supplier to the automotive market.

From 2000 onwards, the company developed Polyethylene foam cushion packaging technology to serve the electronic industry.

The company is now a wholly owned subsidiary of Singaporean-owned company, Sealed Air.

== Products ==
- EnviroFoam — foam made using 100% recycled EPS foam resins
- Specialty resins
- Packaging
- Automotive
- General applications

== Global locations ==
- Fagerdala Industri AB (Sweden)
- Fagerdala Tuotanto Oy (Finland)
- Fagerdala Termonova Oy (Finland)
- Fagerdala UK Ltd (United Kingdom)
- Fagerdala Airofom AG (Switzerland)
- Fagerdala-Paclite Inc (USA) — 4 operating locations in 3 states namely: Lompoc, California Marysville and Marine City, Michigan and Indianapolis, Indiana.
- Fagerdala Mexico SA de CV — (Mexico)
- Fagerdala Singapore Pte Ltd (Singapore) — Asia pacific Headquarters
- Fagerdala Malaysia Sdn Bhd (Malaysia)
- Fagerdala Shanghai Foams Co Ltd (China)
- Fagerdala SuZhou Packaging Co Ltd (China)
- Fagerdala Xiamen Packaging Co Ltd (China)
- Maxfoam Do Brasil LTDA (Brazil)
- Gefinex GmbH (Germany)
- Aldlev Srl (Italy)
- Polyciment (France)
