= Ernest M. Wuliger =

American businessman (died 1992)

- Born: December 10, 1920
- Died: September 5, 1992 (aged 71)
- Occupation: businessman
- Known for: President of the Ohio Mattress Company
- Spouse: Patricia Wise
- Children: E. Jeffrey Wuliger; Gregory Wuliger; Timothy Wuliger

Ernest M. Wuliger (December 10, 1920 – September 5, 1992) was an American businessman who transformed the Ohio Mattress Company into the Sealy Corporation.

== Biography ==
Wuliger was born to a Jewish family in Cleveland, Ohio, the son of Frank Wuliger. His father ran the Ohio Mattress Company which was founded in 1907 by his father Moris Wuliger, a Hungarian Jewish immigrant. In 1939, Wuliger dropped out of The University of Chicago and joined the family business as a payroll clerk and purchasing assistant. During World War II he served as a radar instructor in the United States Navy. After the war, he re-joined the family business and in the 1950s, he was running the company and officially named president after his father died in 1963. He was later named chairman.

In 1970, Ohio Mattress went public, the only publicly held mattress manufacturer in the United States. The initial public offering raised money for further expansion and Wuliger changed the company's name to Ohio-Sealy Mattress Manufacturing Company. In 1983, he purchased the mattress manufacturer Stearns & Foster. In 1924, Ohio Mattress had purchased a local license to make Sealy-branded mattresses in Cleveland and soon acquired other regional licenses in Boston, Houston, and Puerto Rico but was blocked by Sealy and its other franchisees from acquiring more. The conflict resulted in Wuliger filing an antitrust suit against Sealy in 1971. In 1986, the court ruled in Ohio Mattress' favor and awarded Ohio Mattress $77 million. Unable to come up with the judgment, the Sealy Corporation and all but one of its franchisees were forced to sell to Ohio Mattress.

In 1989, Sealy - then the largest manufacturer of bedding in the United States with 28% market share and $700 million in sales - was purchased for $1.0 billion by leveraged buyout firm Gibbons, Green, van Amerongen (now Leonard Green & Partners). Wuliger's share of the transaction was $100 million. In 1990, he attempted to buy back the Stearns & Foster division for $87.5 million but failed. His son Tim Wuliger was president of AIPAC from 1980s.

== Personal life ==
In 1941, he married Patricia Wise; they had three sons: Jeffrey, Gregory, and Timothy. In 1992, Wuliger died of brain cancer.
