= Coldstream Research Campus =

Campus in Lexington, Kentucky, US

Coordinates: 38.0877°N 84.4915°W

Coldstream Research Campus
- Lexington, Kentucky, US

Information
- Motto: Where Business and Research Connect
- Footprint: 735-acre (2.97 km^{2})
- Organizations: over 50
- Employees: 2,100+
- Floor Space: 1.3 million sq. ft.
- Website: Official site

Coldstream Research Campus, in Lexington, Kentucky, is home to over 50 organizations, many with ties to the University of Kentucky. Over 2,100 employees work on the 735-acre campus in agricultural biotechnology, pharmaceuticals, equine health, engineering technology, pharmaceutical manufacturing, and software/IT. Some companies are graduates of ASTeCC, UK's high-tech business incubator, others have licensed UK intellectual property or are clients of the Von Allmen Center for Entrepreneurship.

OpenText, Pirimal Pharma Solutions, Komatsu, Tempur Sealy International, and A&W Restaurants have headquarters or regional offices at Coldstream. Eastern State Hospital, an inpatient psychiatric treatment center and brain injury research center operated by UK HealthCare, opened in September 2013. Coldstream Research Campus houses 21 buildings consisting of 1.3 million square feet of floor space.

The current site of the Coldstream Research Campus has historical significance. It was once the McGrathiana Stud, a famous horse farm founded by Price McGrath that had strong ties to Thoroughbred racing. Aristides, a colt bred and raised at McGrathiana, won the 1875 inaugural running of the Kentucky Derby for Price McGrath.

== See also ==
- Research park
- Technology centers
