= Dial-A-Mattress Franchise Corp. v. Anthony Page =

Dial-A-Mattress Franchise v. Anthony Page
- Court: United States Court of Appeals for the Second Circuit
- Full case name: "Dial-A-Mattress Franchise Corporation v. Anthony Page, dba Easy Associates, Page Industries, and Easy Bed, and Easy Bed, Incorporated"
- Started: June 2, 1989
- Decided: July 27, 1989
- Citations: 880 F.2d 675; 11 U.S.P.Q.2d 1644

Case history
- Prior history: Appeal from United States District Court for the Eastern District of New York

Court membership
- Judges sitting: Jon Ormond Newman, Roger Jeffrey Miner, Robert J. Ward

Case opinions
- Although one company’s use of a generic term does not preclude competitors to use the term for their own business purposes, it does not mean competitors may use the term to deceive the public with a confusingly similar use of that term.

Laws applied
- 28 U.S.C. § 1654

Dial-A-Mattress Franchise Corp. v. Page, 880 F.2d 675 (2d Cir. 1989), is a case that was tried in the United States Court of Appeals for the Second Circuit, which dealt with the issue of whether a plaintiff's telephone number, which translates into a generic term, is entitled to judicial protection when a second comer tries to use a confusingly similar number.

== Legal background ==
Telephone numbers may be protected under trademark law when a competitor attempts to use a confusingly similar number.

As in this case, a generic term is generally excluded from trademark law protection even if the word or number is a variation of that generic term, e.g., the generic term “shoes” as opposed to a variation like “shooz”or “shoe”. However, although a second comer is entitled to use a generic term already being used by a competitor, the second comer may still be enjoined from confusing the public.

== Case facts ==
The plaintiff, Dial-A-Mattress, was a retail dealer that sold mattresses primarily over the phone. Beginning in 1976, the company's phone number in the New York metropolitan area had been 628-8737 or M-A-T-T-R-E-S on the telephone dial. Dial-A-Mattress used this number extensively in advertisements.

In order to enable its customers to make toll-free long-distance calls to place orders, Dial-A-Mattress sought to obtain the number 1-800-628-8737; however, the number was unavailable until January 1989.

Defendant Anthony Page, was in the business of selling beds before deciding to expand his business into mattresses. In order to obtain a telephone number for his new mattress business, Page bought the telephone number of a company that went out of business whose number began with 1-800-MAT and then later exchanged the last four digits to become 1-800-628-8737 or 1-800-MATTRES.

Page was fully aware of Dial-A-Mattress's business number before buying the 1-800 number. He advertised it as 1-800-MATTRESS. Although the ‘S’ at the end of the number seems to add an extra digit than what a normal telephone number would, dialing the extra ‘S’ made no difference; the call would still be placed as 1-800-628-8737.

== Procedural history ==
Following the events stated above, Dial-A-Mattress filed a complaint against Page seeking an injunction, an accounting, and damages on claims of trademark infringement, unfair competition, and unjust enrichment under federal and New York law. A temporary restraining order was issued, enjoining Page from using the 1-800-MATTRESS number and the case was set for an evidentiary hearing.

Ultimately, the District Judge issued a preliminary injunction and held that although Page was allowed to use the 1-800-MATTRES(S) number, Page was to notify the telephone company not to connect to Page's number any calls that came from certain area codes in the New York area (201, 212, 516, 203, and 718), thus disclaiming itself from Dial-A-Mattress's business.

Page appealed.

== Issue ==
As stated by the Appeals Court, the "somewhat novel" issue raised in this case is whether it is unfair competition for a business to acquire a telephone number identified by the spelling of a generic term that a competitor is using (albeit with a spelling modification) to identify its telephone number.

== Court of appeals ruling and reasoning ==
From the start, the court noted that Dial-A-Mattress could not claim trademark rights in the word “mattress” used solely to identify its company or its product. It further stated that protection would not be available if the word was used for these purposes with a spelling variation that did not change the generic significance for the buyer, such as “MATTRES.”

The court then noted that a second comer may be enjoined from passing itself off as the first user and may be required to take steps to distinguish itself from the first user.

Getting to the crux of the matter, the court stated that telephone numbers may be protected as trademarks, and a competitor's use of a confusingly similar telephone number may be enjoined as both trademark infringement and unfair competition, especially when companies doing significant business through telephone orders frequently promote their telephone numbers as a key identification of the source of their products.

The court concluded by affirming the preliminary injunction and reasoned that although one company's use of a generic term does not preclude competitors from using the term for their own business purposes, it does not mean competitors may use the term to deceive the public with a confusingly similar use of that term. It stated that the District Court was clearly entitled to conclude that defendant's use of the telephone number 1-800-628-8737 was confusingly similar to plaintiff's telephone number 628-8737 in those area code regions in which plaintiff solicited telephone orders, especially in view of defendant's identification of its number as 1-800-MATTRESS after plaintiff had promoted identification of its number as (area code)-MATTRES.

== See also ==
- 1800Mattress.com
