= Dreams (bed retailer) =

UK-based bed retailer

Dreams Limited
- Formerly: Project Night Bidco Limited (4–6 March 2013); Dreams Trading Limited (6–7 March 2013)
- Type: Limited company
- Industry: Furniture retailing and manufacturing
- Founded: 1985; 41 years ago
- Headquarters: Loudwater, High Wycombe, Buckinghamshire
- Area served: United Kingdom
- Key people: Jonathan Hirst, Chief executive
- Products: Beds; Bedroom furniture Bedsteads; Duvets; Mattresses; Pillows
- Revenue: ▲£395.4 million (2023)
- Operating income: ▼£47.5 million (2023)
- Net income: ▼£38.1 million (2023)
- Owner: Somnigroup International
- Number of employees: 2,275 (2023)
- Website: dreams.co.uk

Dreams Limited is a United Kingdom-based bed retailer and manufacturer specialising in beds, mattresses, bedroom furniture and bed linen. The first Dreams store was opened in 1987 by Mike Clare, and today there are over 200 stores nationwide. The company has its own purpose-designed mattress factory, and currently employs around 1,500 people, across a network of retail showrooms.

== History ==
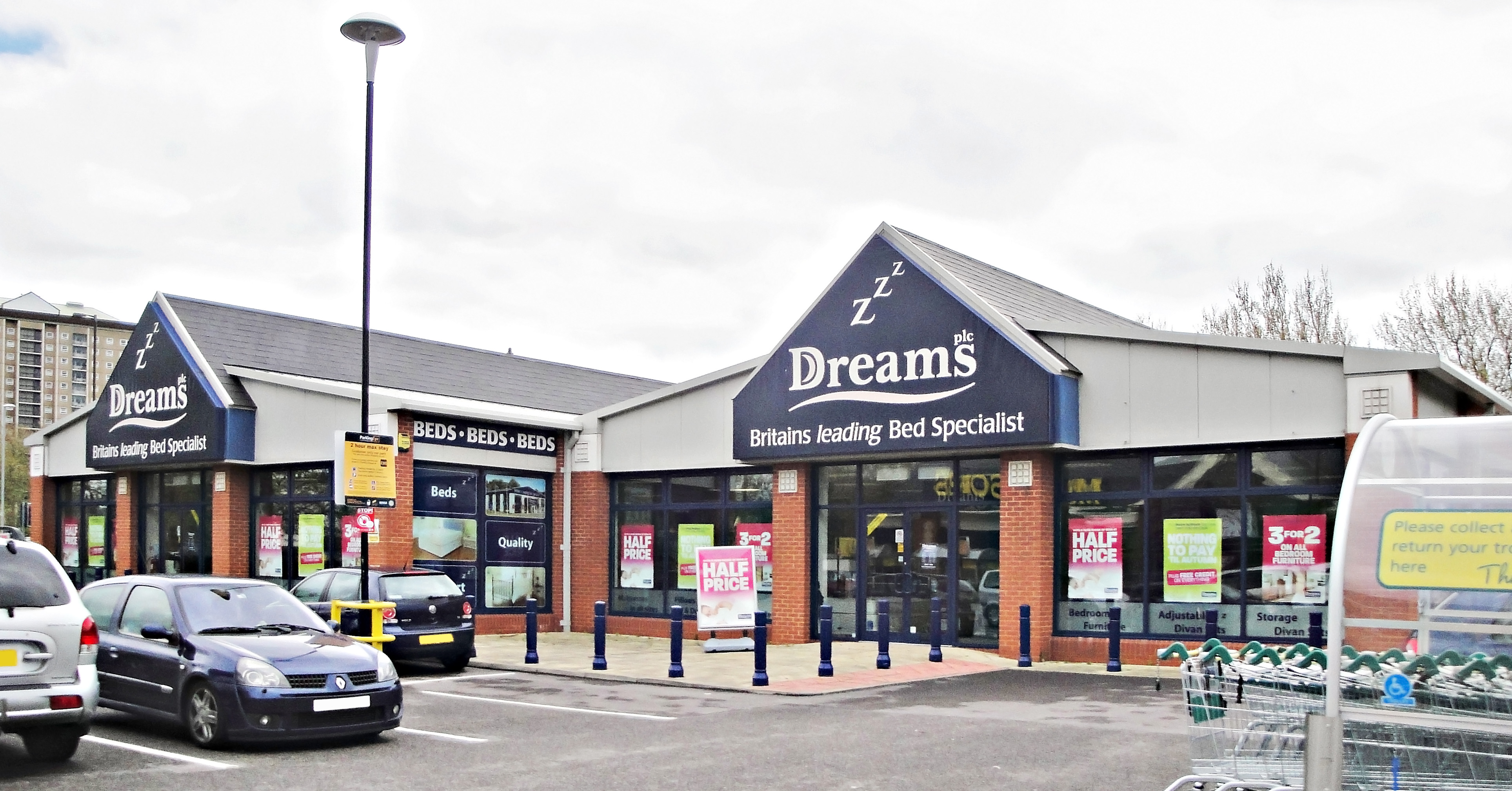
Dreams store in Portsmouth, England

The first Dreams store opened in Uxbridge in 1985. By 2000, Dreams had 50 stores, and opened its own mattress factory in Oldbury, Birmingham.

In April 2013, Dreams PLC went into a pre packaged administration, and was purchased by Sun European Partners. It has since traded as Dreams Ltd.

Sun European Partners put the retailer up for sale in early 2017, advised by N M Rothschild & Sons.

In May 2021, Dreams was acquired by Tempur Sealy International (now known as Somnigroup International).

Around 2021/2022, most Dreams stores in Northern Ireland were renamed to Bedtime to match the Sofatime brand, this rebrand was backtracked in 2023, with the stores rebranding back to the Dreams name.

In 2023, Dreams opened their first store in the Republic of Ireland in Galway, followed by stores in Dublin and Limerick.

== TV advertising ==
Dreams was the main sponsor of the Channel 4 reality television show Celebrity Big Brother from its sixth series in 2009 to its seventh series in 2010. In 2013, they then sponsored the eleventh series of Celebrity Big Brother, this time on Channel 5. In winter 2023, Dreams sponsored ITV's Dancing on Ice.

In 2023, Dreams changed its strapline to "Love your bed".

== Investigations ==
Investigations into the business's operations have been conducted by the United Kingdom's Office of Fair Trading in 1998 and again in 2001, due to contracts in breach of the Unfair Terms in Consumer Contracts Regulations 1999. Following customer complaints, the company was also investigated and featured on BBC's Watchdog programme. In response to this matter Dreams made an apology on the programme.

In February 2007, Dreams was investigated and censured by the Advertising Standards Agency for misleading claims in its promotional material. In 2010, another complaint against Dreams was upheld by the ASA, which ruled that Dreams' advertising broke the rules regarding truthfulness, and contained misleading advertising without evidence to back up its claims.

== Awards ==
- High Street Recycling Champion 2008
- British Safety Council – International Safety Award 2015
- West London Business Awards – Retail Business of the Year 2017
- Sunday Times Profit Track 100 2018
- The Drum Social Buzz Awards 2018 – Best Use of Group/Community (Mumsnet)
- National Bed Federation 2018-19 – Large Bed Retailer of the Year
