= Jesse Simons =

Jesse Simons (November 5, 1917 – July 8, 2006) was an American labor arbitrator, who helped set in place a system of collective bargaining between New York City (NYC) and its employees.

== Early life ==
Simons was born in New Haven, Connecticut, he attended the University of Minnesota, the University of Washington and the University of New York, he failed to earn a degree from any of these institutions. Simons was a firm believer in unionism and his politics during the 1930s and 1940s were Trotskyist. During this period, he held a variety of jobs from machinist to Linotype operator. From 1944-1946, Simons served in the Army Air Forces.

== Career ==
After demobilization, Simons became Political Director of the International Ladies' Garment Workers' Union. He later became manager of Personnel and Industrial Relations for the New York Post, a position he held until 1961.

From 1963-1966, Simons directed the American Arbitration Association's Labor Management Institute. Following two lengthy strikes in 1965 by NYC employees, Mayor Robert F. Wagner, Jr. convened a committee to create an independent agency to oversee municipal labor relations. Simons was an adviser to this committee and his contribution ultimately helped to bring about the NYC Collective Bargaining Law (1967). This law led to the formation of the NYC Office of Collective Bargaining, who mediate and arbitrate between the city and the bulk of its employees.

Simons died in New York, at age 88, from heart failure.
