= Eva Wasserman-Margolis =

American classical composer

- אווה ואסרמן-מרגוליס
- Born: Key West, Florida
- Education: Master of Music, University of Illinois
- Occupation(s): Clarinetist, conductor and pedagogue
- Website: evawassermanmargolis.com

Eva Wasserman-Margolis (Hebrew: אווה ואסרמן-מרגוליס) is an American-born Israeli composer, conductor and clarinet player.

== Biography ==
Eva Wasserman-Margolis was born on the island of Key West, Florida. In 1980 she received her master's degree in Music Performance from the University of Illinois and in the same year secured the position of principal clarinet with the Haifa Symphony in Israel. She has performed and given master classes in the US, Canada, Europe, Israel and Asia. Her two CDs Two Clarinets and Piano-original music from Finland, Malta and Unforgettable Hues, both recorded with the Italian clarinetist Luigi Magistrelli, are her major recordings and legacy. Wasserman-Margolis searched for music that was interesting and not known to the clarinet world, in order to prove that there is much music in the world by lesser known composers that has an important place in our concert halls. Wasserman-Margolis's compositions have been performed all over the world including festivals such as the Women in Music Festival at Eastman School of Music. She is included in the book The Great Clarinets by Gianaluca Campagnolo.

Mrs. Wasserman-Margolis recently retired from being the main instructor of clarinet at the Conservatory in Givatayim. She had held this position there since 1984. Givataim is a small city outside of Tel Aviv where she resides.

== Publications ==
Methodology Books

- Thinking Tone
- Time for Tone
- Learning Clarinet the Artistic Way (Hebrew and Arabic)

Compositions

- The Generation of Hope
- Ode to Odessa
