= King Koil =

Mattress manufacturer

- Formerly: United States Bedding Company
- Type: Privately held company
- Founded: 1898; 128 years ago in Saint Paul, Minnesota, USA
- Founder: Samuel Bronstein
- Headquarters: Avondale, Arizona, United States
- Area served: Worldwide
- Key people: David Binke (CEO)
- Products: Bedding
- Parent: Kumpulan Perangsang Selangor (since 2016); Kaiserkorp Corp (since 2015)
- Website: kingkoil.com

King Koil is an American manufacturer of mattresses and related bedding products, headquartered in Avondale, Arizona. The company was founded in 1898 and is among the oldest in its industry in the United States. It operates in over 90 countries and has more than 30 licensees.

In 2015 and 2016 the firm came under the ownership and operation of Malaysia-based Kumpulan Perangsang Selangor (60%) and Kaiserkorp Corp (40%) as a result of acquisitions made then.

== History ==
The company was founded in 1898 as the United States Bedding Company by Samuel Bronstein in Saint Paul, Minnesota, USA. It commenced its operations with six employees in a small factory and gradually expanded its manufacturing. The company was officially incorporated as United States Bedding Co. in 1905.

By 1912, the company had developed a complete product line that included mattresses, frames, pillows, and couches. In the early 1900s, U.S. Bedding expanded its workforce and gained recognition for innovation in the industry. In 1923, the company obtained its first patent for a non-stretchable mattress. By 1926, it had 150 employees.

During the Great Depression of the 1930s, the U.S. Bedding Company held a naming contest for their redesigned mattress. The winning entry, 'King Koil', proposed by a 13-year-old African-American girl named Erla Bell Thompson, became the brand's name.

King Koil had supplied the U.S. Government with cots, beds, and mattresses during World War I and World War II. During the war years, the company manufactured various military equipment and furniture, including wooden gun racks, chopping blocks, billy clubs, submarine bunks, stretchers, and beds for military bases worldwide, while also focusing on the sales and marketing of King Koil mattresses.

In the late 1970s, King Koil completed the acquisition of the Englander Mattress Company, followed by a merger with King Koil. This strategic move resulted in a substantial expansion of the company's scale and presence.

In 1982, the company commenced its franchising operations, and by April 1990, it had established 175 franchisees operating in 22 states across the United States.

In 2015, King Koil Licensing Company was acquired by Kaiserkorp Corp, its licensee from Malaysia. In May 2016, Kumpulan Perangsang Selangor (KPS) acquired a 60% stake in King Koil for US$28.8 million, while Kaiserkorp Corp retained the remaining 40% of the stake.

In December 2019, the company shifted its U.S. headquarters from Willowbrook, Illinois, to Avondale, Arizona, where its manufacturing plant had been in operation since May 2018.

In 2024, King Koil was acquired by AI Dream, a licensing division of Hillhouse Investment Management.

== Operations ==
The company shifted to a licensing model. As of 2019, it has over 30 licensees and is operating in more than 90 countries.

King Koil ventured into the United Arab Emirates in 1993, collaborating with its licensee, Dubai Furniture Manufacturing Company (DFMC), which became the first licensee in the Middle East, and now it operates 15 King Koil showrooms in the UAE.

In September 2006, King Koil signed a licensing agreement with Askona to manufacture and market mattresses in Russia, Belarus, Ukraine, and Kazakhstan.

King Koil began its foray into the Chinese market in 2000 through a licensing agreement with King Koil Shanghai Sleep System Co., Ltd. In August 2014, CITIC Capital, a private equity firm, secured a controlling stake in the company. Subsequently, in November 2016, Advent International acquired a majority stake in King Koil China.

After being acquired by Kaiserkorp Corp in 2015, King Koil returned to its role as a direct manufacturer in the United States. The Avondale facility of King Koil serves 17 states, such as Arizona, Arkansas, Alaska, California, Colorado, Hawaii, Idaho, Louisiana, Montana, Nevada, New Mexico, Oklahoma, Oregon, Texas, Utah, Washington, and Wyoming. The company manages manufacturing and distribution in the eastern United States through a strategic partnership with Blue Bell Mattress.

King Koil also has licensees in Indonesia, Malaysia, the Philippines, Singapore, and Vietnam within the Southeast Asian region.

=== King Koil India ===
King Koil entered the Indian market in early 2007, starting in Mumbai and later expanding to Bangalore. The company had established eight showrooms in Mumbai, Bangalore, Pune, Nasik, and Delhi.

In September 2013, King Koil signed a sole licensee agreement with Real Innerspring Technologies Limited (RITL), involving an investment of ₹400 crore (US$42 million). King Koil India is the authorized licensee for India, Nepal, Bhutan, and Bangladesh and operates four factories in Sonipat, Kolkata, Bengaluru, and Bhiwandi near Mumbai, with a combined manufacturing capacity of around 10,000 mattresses per month as of December 2022.

King Koil India operates in both the retail and hospitality sectors, with notable clients that include Hilton, Hyatt, Marriott, Radisson, and Ramada.

== Reception ==
The New York Times, in a review, published in October 2023, recognized King Koil's Air Mattress as the runner-up, citing its comfort and its ability to retain air throughout the night without requiring reinflation. In March 2023, USA Today conducted a review that included testing King Koil's air mattress, with the publication describing it as comfortable. In September 2023, CNN's editor tested King Koil's air mattress and called it a clear winner in their review.

Many of King Koil's products are endorsed by the International Chiropractors Association and were awarded the Good Housekeeping Seal of Approval by Good Housekeeping magazine.
