= Barbara Albright =

American author

Barbara Albright (July 2, 1955 in Nebraska – July 5, 2006 in Branford, Connecticut) was an American author of about 25 food and knitting books.

== Biography ==
Albright graduated from Fremont High School in Fremont, Nebraska and from the University of Nebraska–Lincoln with a bachelor's degree in food and nutrition. In 1980, she received her master's degree in nutrition communications from Boston University.

She was the author or co-authored of numerous cookbooks and knitting books, including Cooking with Regis and Kathie Lee (which reached number one on the New York Times bestseller list), Entertaining with Regis and Kathie Lee, Mostly Muffins and its followup More Muffins (both with Leslie Weiner), Oddball Knitting, and The Natural Knitter.

She was a food editor at Redbook and Woman's World magazines and editor-in-chief of The Chocolatier magazine. She also wrote articles for Good Housekeeping, Traditional Home, Family Fun and Country Living magazines and the Associated Press.

In 1999, she was inducted into the James Beard Cookbook Hall of Fame.

A resident of Wilton, Connecticut, Albright died of a brain tumor at a Branford, Connecticut hospice at age 51 on July 5, 2006.

== Bibliography ==
- Mostly Muffins: Quick and Easy Recipes for Over 75 Delicious Muffins and Spreads. St Martin's Griffin. November 1984. ISBN 978-0312549169.
- Cooking With Regis & Kathie Lee: Quick & Easy Recipes From America's Favorite TV Personalities. Hyperion. February 1993. ISBN 978-1562829308.
- Totally Teabreads: Quick & Easy Recipes For More Than 60 Delicious Quick Breads & Spreads. St. Martin's Griffin. February 1994. ISBN 978-0312105617.
- Entertaining With Regis & Kathie Lee: Year-Round Holiday Recipes, Entertaining Tips, and Party Ideas. Hyperion. October 1995. ISBN 978-0786881307.
- Girl Food: Cathy's Cookbook for the Well-Balanced Woman. Andrews McMeel Publishing. June 1997. ISBN 978-0836231731.
- Margaritas: Recipes for Margaritas and South-of-the-Border Snacks. Andrews McMeel Publishing. 2000. ISBN 978-0740710339.
- Knitter's Stash: Favorite Patterns from America's Yarn Shops. Interweave Press. September 2001. ISBN 978-1883010898.
- I'm in the Mood for Food: In the Kitchen with Garfield. Andrews McMeel Publishing. 2003. ISBN 0-7407-3386-9.
- Simple Knits for Sophisticated Living: Quick-Knit Projects from Beautiful, Chunky Yarns. Quarry Books. January 2003. ISBN 978-1564969187.
- 1,001 Reasons to Love Chocolate. Stewart, Tabori and Chang. October 2004. ISBN 1584793295.
- Odd Ball Knitting: Creative Ideas for Leftover Yarn. Potter Craft. September 2005. ISBN 978-1400053513.
- The Natural Knitter: How to Choose, Use, and Knit Natural Fibers from Alpaca to Yak. Potter Craft. March 2007. ISBN 978-1400053520.
