= Ulli Jansen =

German ice hockey player (1931–2006)

- Born: June 5, 1931 Krefeld, Germany
- Died: July 19, 2006 (aged 75)
- Height: 5 ft 7 in (170 cm)
- Weight: 168 lb (76 kg; 12 st 0 lb)
- Position: Goaltender
- Played for: Krefelder Eislaufverein
- National team: Germany
- Playing career: 1956–1964

Ulrich Jansen (5 June 1931 - 19 July 2006) was a professional ice hockey player. He represented the United Team of Germany in the 1956, 1960, and 1964 Winter Olympics.
