= Somnigroup International =

American company that manufactures mattresses

Somnigroup International Inc.
- Formerly: Tempur Sealy International, Inc.
- Type: Public
- Traded as: NYSE: SGI; S&P 400 component
- Industry: Furnishings
- Founded: 2012; 14 years ago (merger of Sealy Corporation into Tempur-Pedic)
- Headquarters: Lexington, Kentucky, U.S.
- Key people: Scott L. Thompson (chairman, president and CEO)
- Products: Bedding
- Brands: Sealy Posturepedic; Tempur; Tempur-Pedic; Stearns & Foster; Bassett; Mattress Firm
- Revenue: ▲US$4.930 billion (FY 2021)
- Operating income: ▲US$912.3 million (FY 2021)
- Net income: ▲US$624.5 million (FY 2021)
- Total assets: ▲US$4.323 billion (FY 2021)
- Total equity: ▼US$285.8 million (FY 2021)
- Number of employees: 12,000 (As of Dec. 31, 2021)
- Subsidiaries: Sealy Corporation; Tempur-Pedic; Dreams
- Website: somnigroup.com

Somnigroup International Inc. is an American manufacturer of mattresses and bedding products.

The company was formed when Tempur-Pedic International, a manufacturer of memory foam mattresses, acquired its biggest competitor Sealy Corporation in 2012. It is based in Lexington, Kentucky.

In May 2023, Temper Sealy sought to acquire mattress retailer Mattress Firm for a reported $4 billion. However, in July 2024 the deal was blocked by the United States Federal Trade Commission due to concerns about its impact on competition in the space. The company sued the Federal Trade Commission in October to halt the court proceedings and won the case in January 2025, allowing the deal to go through.

The acquisition was finalized in February 2025 and Tempur Sealy changed its name to Somnigroup International Inc.

On August 26, 2026, Somnigroup International Inc. announced that it had completed its combination with Leggett & Platt, Incorporated, a diversified manufacturer of engineered components and products.

Former logo as Tempur-Sealy

== See also ==
- Sleep hygiene
- Memory foam
- Foam rubber
