= Pat Davey =

Australian rules footballer, born 1913

Personal information
- Full name: Pat Davey
- Born: 14 April 1913
- Died: 19 July 2006 (aged 93)
- Original team: Wonthaggi Tech Old Collegians
- Height: 183 cm (6 ft 0 in)
- Weight: 76 kg (168 lb)

Playing career^{1}
Years	Club	Games (Goals)
1935–36, 1942	Richmond	10 (4)
- ^{1} Playing statistics correct to the end of 1942.

Pat Davey (14 April 1913 – 19 July 2006) was an Australian rules footballer who played with Richmond in the Victorian Football League (VFL).
