= Wassermann Lake =

Lake in the state of Minnesota, United States

- Location within Minnesota
- Location: Carver County, Minnesota
- Coordinates: 44°50′29″N 93°40′28″W
- Type: lake

Wassermann Lake is a lake in Carver County, Minnesota, in the United States.

Wassermann Lake was named for Michael Wassermann, a pioneer settler.

== See also ==
- List of lakes in Minnesota
