= United States Bedding Company =

- U.S. National Register of Historic Places
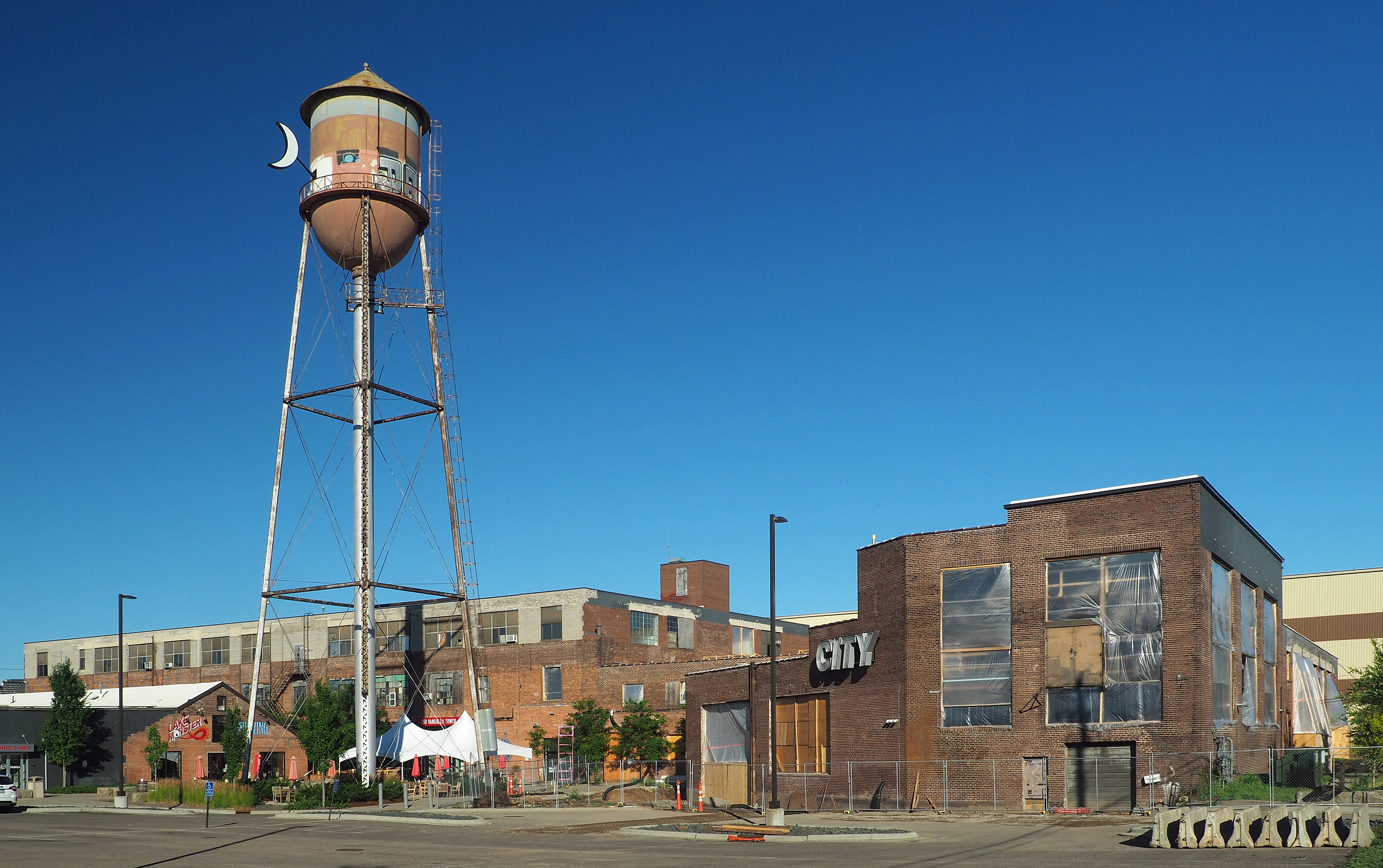

- Location within Minnesota
- Location: 550 Vandalia St., St. Paul, Minnesota
- Coordinates: 44°57′29″N 93°11′28″W
- Area: 5.31 acres (2.15 ha)
- NRHP reference No.: 100005358
- Added to NRHP: July 24, 2020

The United States Bedding Company building in Saint Paul, Minnesota was the headquarters of one of the earliest, largest, and most successful mattress manufacturers in the city. The company, formed in 1898, moved to the site on Vandalia Street in the Saint Anthony Park neighborhood in 1927. The building was listed on the National Register of Historic Places in 2020.

== History ==
The firm was established in 1898 and was originally housed in the owners' home. Samuel and Anna Bronstein, along with five employees, sewed the cloth covering of the mattresses on an ordinary sewing machine, then used large, curved needles to hand-sew the tufting and the edges of the mattresses. As the firm needed more space, they moved to a factory on East Seventh Street in 1904. A fire that year destroyed the factory, so the firm established a larger location on West Tenth Street. The growing company needed more space, so they moved to the corner of Western and Minnehaha Avenues. That factory was destroyed by a fire in January 1927, so they purchased the former Blekre Tire Company plant at the corner of Vandalia Street and Wabash Avenue and moved the firm there. The factory was organized so all materials would move straight across the floor. Mattresses were manufactured on the second floor, while the first floor was used to manufacture bed springs, steel couches, and daybeds.

During the Great Depression in the 1930s, the owners decided they needed a catchy name for their redesigned mattress. They sponsored a public naming contest with a $25 grand prize. The winner was Miss Era Bell Thompson of North Dakota, an African American girl who was 13 at the time. The mattress name, King Koil, caught on and eventually became the name of the company.

After World War II, the housing boom created an increased demand for furniture and mattresses. The business, still owned by the Bronstein family, worked on improving the business, increasing brand recognition, and continuing to innovate. They ran a huge advertising campaign in 1949, with weekly ads in newspapers as well as radio and TV advertising. By 1950, they were calling themselves "the best known brand in bedding in the entire Northwest." They filed for patents for machines that improved the filling, tufting, and assembly processes. The increased demand for mattresses led them to build a factory in Kenyon, Minnesota to make coils and a factory in Bayport, Minnesota to make wood frames, furniture, bunk beds, and other products.

In 1968, United States Bedding Company acquired Englander, which was three times its size. Englander had 12 plants in the United States and operated nationwide. Englander was managed by Union Carbide, and financing for the acquisition was performed by a complicated financial arrangement where US Bedding borrowed money against Union Carbide's real estate, then sold off duplicate facilities to generate the cash required for the purchase. After the acquisition, US Bedding Company was truly a national company and operated as a parent to the two brands of Englander and King Koil. The company left the St. Paul location in the 1980s and moved their headquarters to a suburb of Chicago.

== Current use ==
The building, now known as Vandalia Tower, houses a variety of tenants, including several arts-related and creative businesses. Two of these tenants are Lake Monster Brewing and the Independent Filmmaker Project Minnesota. The owners of Lake Monster Brewing liked the original brick walls and the polished cement floor, along with a 1,500 square feet (140 m^{2}) patio to be used in good weather. The proximity to Interstate 94 and the Metro Green Line also make the location desirable.
