= Ryan Wasserman =

Professor of philosophy

Academic background
- Education: Rutgers University (PhD)
- Thesis: The Problem of Change (2005)
- Doctoral advisor: Theodore Sider

Academic work
- Era: Contemporary philosophy
- Region: Western philosophy
- Institutions: Western Washington University
- Website: https://sites.google.com/view/ryan-wasserman

Ryan Jon Wasserman is a professor of philosophy at Western Washington University.

== Publications ==
=== Monographs ===
- Wasserman, Ryan (2018-01-18). Paradoxes of Time Travel. Vol. 1. Oxford University Press. doi:10.1093/oso/9780198793335.001.0001. ISBN 978-0-19-879333-5.

=== Edited volumes ===
- Chalmers, David; Manley, David; Wasserman, Ryan, eds. (2009-02-19). Metametaphysics: New Essays on the Foundations of Ontology. Oxford University PressOxford. doi:10.1093/oso/9780199546046.001.0001. ISBN 978-0-19-954604-6.
