= George Hopkins Williams II =

George Hopkins Williams Jr.
- Born: April 7, 1915; Frost, Texas
- Died: July 9, 2006 (aged 91); Dallas, Texas
- Occupation: Historian
- Spouse: Ginny Williams
- Children: Holly A. Williams Hays (1944-2004); Kaye Williams Peterson; Scott G. Williams.
- Parent: George Hopkins Williams II

George Hopkins Williams Jr. (April 7, 1915 – July 9, 2006) was an insurance executive who created the George H. Williams World War I Aviation Collection at McDermott Library at The University of Texas at Dallas.

== Early life ==
He was born in Frost, Texas on April 7, 1915, and had three siblings: Max Williams; Emily Williams Tooker; and Ralph Williams. He spent his youth in Waco, Texas and graduated from Baylor University in 1939. He was a veteran of World War II and attended Harvard University to study radio and electronics, and was reassigned to the 94th Signal Battalion with General Patton's Third Army in relief of Bastogne during the Battle of the Bulge. He was also at Remagen.

== Personal life ==
He married Ginny Butcher and had the following children: Holly A. Williams Hays (1944–2004); Kaye Williams Peterson; and Scott Williams. He had 7 grandchildren and 7 great-grandchildren.

He worked in the mortgage loan division at Equitable Life insurance in Dallas. He assembled considerable material that became the cornerstone of the University of Texas at Dallas.

== Death and legacy ==
He died on July 9, 2006, at his home in Dallas.

== Selected works ==
- Skelton, Marvin L., and George Hopkins Williams. Lt. Henry R. Clay: Sopwith Camel Ace. [Richardson, Tex.]: University of Texas at Dallas, History of Aviation Collection, 1998. ISBN 0966672402
