= Erik Terkelsen =

Danish footballer (1926-2006)

Personal information
- Date of birth: 3 July 1926
- Date of death: 1 July 2006 (aged 79)
- Position: Midfielder

Senior career*
Years	Team	Apps	(Gls)
- Esbjerg fB
- * Club domestic league appearances and goals

Erik Terkelsen (3 July 1926 – 1 July 2006) was a Danish footballer who competed in the 1952 Summer Olympics.
