= Mildred Riddelsdell =

British civil servant

Dame Mildred Riddelsdell DCB CBE
- Born: 1 December 1913; Llandaff, Glamorgan, Wales
- Died: 25 July 2006 (aged 92); Shipton-under-Wychwood, Oxfordshire, England
- Education: Bedford College, London
- Occupation: Civil servant

Dame Mildred Riddelsdell DCB CBE (1 December 1913 – 25 July 2006) was a British civil servant. Along with "Dame Evelyn Sharp at Housing and Dame Mary Smieton at Education, she was one of the first women to reach the pinnacle of the Civil Service".

== Early life ==
She was born on 1 December 1913 at the Old Registry, Llandaff, Glamorgan, the second of the three daughters of Harry Joseph Riddelsdell (1866–1941), sub-warden of St. Michael's College, Llandaff, and his wife, Maud Riddelsdell, née Butt (c.1870–1943). She graduated from Bedford College, London, now part of Royal Holloway, University of London.

== Career ==
Riddelsdell was Assistant Secretary, Ministry of National Insurance from 1945 to 1950, and Under-Secretary from 1950 to 1965, during which time, she was on loan to the United Nations from 1953 to 1956. In 1945, she had a crucial role in creating the contributory benefits system created by the incoming Labour government, that was to be central to the welfare state.

Riddelsdell was Secretary, of the National Incomes Commission from 1962-65. She was Under-Secretary, Ministry of Pensions and National Insurance in 1965, and Under-Secretary, Ministry of Social Security in 1966. She was Deputy Secretary, Department of Health and Social Security from 1966 to 1971, and Second Permanent Secretary from 1971 to 1973, and only the third woman to rise to the grade of permanent secretary. She was the Chairman, Civil Service Retirement Fellowship from 1974 to 1977.

== Honours ==
In 1958, she was made a CBE. In 1972, she was the first woman to be appointed Dame Commander of the Order of the Bath.

== Personal life ==
She never married. She enjoyed reading, gardening and travel.

== Later life ==
She died on 25 July 2006, following a stroke at the Old Prebendal House nursing home in Shipton-under-Wychwood, Oxfordshire.
