= Toppo Wassermann College =

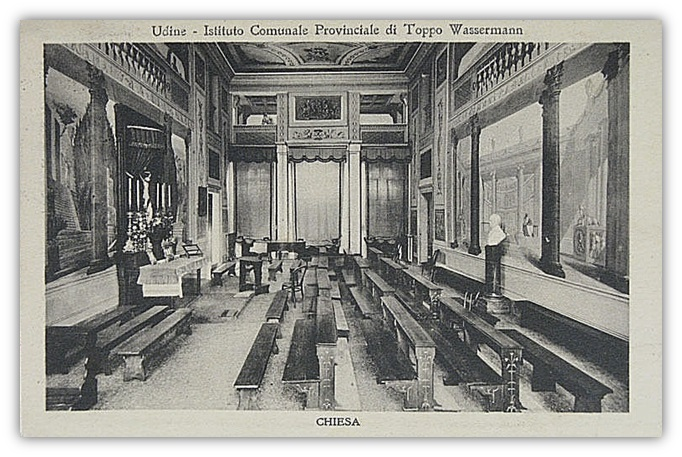
- Type: Private
- Established: 1900
- Location: Udine, I, Italy
- Campus: Urban
- Website: http://qui.uniud.it

The Toppo Wassermann College (named for Count Francesco Toppo Wassermann) was a boarding school from 1900 until closing in the 1981–82 school year. It was located at No. 90 Via Gemona, Udine, Italy. The name Toppo Wassermann is now linked to, among other local institutions, a library, a primary school and the School of Excellence of the University of Udine.

== Bibliography ==
- L'istituto comunale, provinciale di Toppo Wassermann nel 25º anno della sua fondazione: Udine 1900–1925 (in Italian). Udine: Tipografia Giuseppe Vatri. 1925. ICCU IT\ICCU\CUB\0346970.
- Burelli, Ottorino (2000). "Il Friuli di Ottavio Valerio". Quaderni dell'Accademia (in Italian). 9. Tavagnacco: Accademia udinese di Scienze, Lettere ed Arti: 11–15. OCLC 801058213.
