= Jeffrey Wasserman =

American painter

Jeffrey Wasserman (1946 – July 2, 2006, in Millerton, New York) was an abstract artist who became known in New York in the 1980s for his colorful and expressive oil paintings.

== Background ==
He was an early pioneer in Soho and showed his work extensively in the East Village and Soho during the 1980s and 1990s. He was closely allied with artists Jeff Koons, Peter Halley and Saint Clair Cemin.

Wasserman died of cancer at his home on July 2, 2006.
