= Andy Vallario =

American songwriter

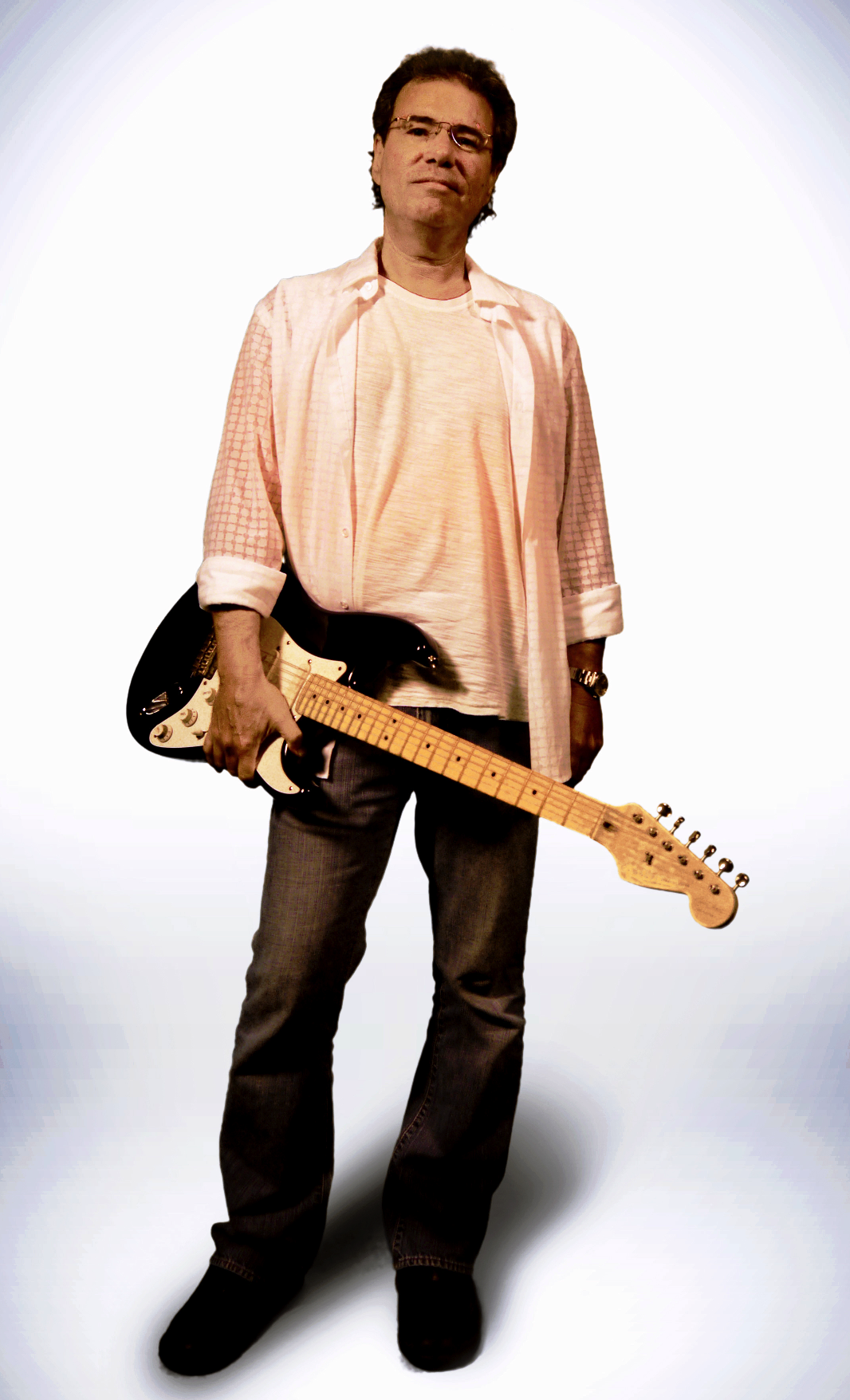
- Vallario in 2013

Background information
- Occupations: Jingle writer, musician, producer

Andy Vallario is a jingle writer, musician, producer and president and chief creative officer of Media Results, Inc., a full-service Greater Boston advertising agency.

== Early life ==
Andy's father taught him his first chords on an acoustic guitar when he was in the fifth grade. A year later his mother bought him his first electric guitar, and Vallario began writing songs that were heavily influenced by "hooky" melodies from his early idols, The Beatles.

Vallario spent his high school and college days in several rock bands, writing, recording and performing his own music.

Although Vallario never stopped writing, he accepted a full time position as a high school English teacher.

== Career ==
=== Handy Productions ===
In the mid Eighties, Vallario left his tenured teaching job to start his own music jingle company, Handy Productions, which he named after blues pioneer W.C. Handy.

Vallario began writing jingles for Greater Boston clients, but soon started producing music for regional and national advertisers like McDonald's, Burger King, Goodyear, Gulf Gasoline, Honda, Toyota, Fila and Dial-A-Mattress.

In New England, Vallario is known for creating the 1-800-54-GIANT jingle for Giant Glass. According to an article in Boston Magazine, it's "the most recognizable jingle in the history of New England media." It was also used as a recurring theme in Steve King's #1 bestseller, "The Girl Who Loved Tom Gordon".

Vallario has also written and produced popular New England jingles like We're There When You Need Us for East West Mortgage, Come On Down for Boch Automotive and It's What Makes A Subaru a Subaru for the Subaru Dealers of New England.

=== Media Results ===
By 2002, Handy Productions had morphed into a full-service marketing firm, and changed its name to Media Results.

Vallario was not just producing jingles anymore. He was creating ad concepts, writing copy and overseeing the agency's media buying department.

By mid-decade, Media Results began specializing in automotive marketing.

=== Songwriting ===
Vallario continues to write and produce his own music, which he describes as contemporary pop/rock, but he says he just never got into writing for labels. He recently told a radio talk show host, "My jingles pay my bills." Stealing a line from Paul McCartney he added, "I tell my wife, I'm going to the studio to write a swimming pool."
