= Sealy Corporation =

Mattress manufacturer

- Type: Subsidiary
- Traded as: NYSE: ZZ
- Industry: Furnishings
- Founded: 1881; 145 years ago in Sealy, Texas, U.S.
- Founder: Daniel Haynes
- Headquarters: Trinity, North Carolina, U.S.
- Key people: Larry Rogers (president and CEO)
- Products: Bedding
- Number of employees: 4,817 (full-time)
- Parent: Somnigroup International (2012–present)
- Website: www.sealy.com

Sealy (formerly the Sealy Corporation) is an American brand of mattresses marketed and sold by Somnigroup International. It draws its name from the city where the Sealy Corporation originally started: Sealy, Texas.

== History ==
In 1881, cotton gin builder Daniel Haynes lived in Sealy, Texas, located west of Houston. He began making cotton-filled mattresses for his friends and neighbors. In 1889, he patented an invention that compressed cotton for use in his mattresses. Eventually the mattresses became so popular he was able to sell the patents to manufacturers in other markets. The term "Mattress from Sealy" was coined to describe what was produced.

During 1906, after much success as an advertising executive, Earl Edwards purchased the patents and gained manufacturing knowledge from Haynes. Edwards took the name "Sealy" for his new company and expanded it to a national market.

Due to lack of funding for manufacturing, Sealy expanded using a licensing-expansion similar to that of Coca-Cola. By 1920, Sealy had 28 licensed plants and was the first mattress company to expand using a licensing program.

During the Great Depression the mattress industry was hit hard. Sealy lost most of its licensees and narrowly escaped bankruptcy itself. The company consolidated with the surviving licensees and created what is now known as Sealy, Incorporated.

Sealy operated as a franchisor out of its Chicago headquarters. Its licensees were, under the terms of their licensing agreement, only supposed to sell in a designated trading area that did not conflict with those of other franchisees. The largest licensee, Cleveland-based Ohio Mattress Company (founded by the Wuliger family and operated by Ernest M. Wuliger), defied these restrictions and sold into markets reserved for other franchisees. The conflict resulted in Ohio Mattress filing an antitrust suit against Sealy in 1971. The issue was decided fifteen years later with a victory for Ohio Mattress. Unable to pay the $77m award, Sealy Incorporated and all but one of the other franchisees were forced to sell to Ohio Mattress, and the company became the world's largest bedding manufacturer by sales.

Merchant banking firm Gibbons Green Van Amerongen took Sealy private in an April 1989 leveraged buyout, a deal which netted Sealy shareholders US$965m. First Boston made a bridge loan to the buy-out firm just as Drexel Burnham Lambert was running into trouble and the junk bond market was drying up, and was stuck with the loan. The failed deal, known as "burning bed", led to a dramatic slow-down in leveraged buyouts. Gibbons Green dissolved and First Boston was forced into the arms of Credit Suisse.

In 1990, Ohio Mattress assumed the Sealy name that it had acquired when it purchased Sealy Inc. In 1998 Sealy announced that it was moving from Cleveland to the High Point, North Carolina area.

Bain Capital and a team of Sealy's senior executives acquired the company in 1997. In 2004, the company was acquired by Kohlberg Kravis Roberts and a team of Sealy management. The deal was valued at $1.5 billion but included significant debt. The company operated as a privately held corporation until 2005. On June 30 of that year, it announced an initial public offering of common stock. The company said proceeds from the IPO would go to paying down debt, funding global operations and paying private equity firm Kohlberg Kravis Roberts to "terminate our future obligations under our management services agreement."

In September 2012, Tempur-Pedic International (TPX) announced an agreement to purchase Sealy (NYSE:ZZ) for about US$229 million.

Sealy's corporate headquarters are located in Trinity, North Carolina. Although Sealy's website claims that they are the largest manufacturer of mattresses in the world, Tempur-Pedic had greater revenue than Sealy in 2011. Sealy has 25 U.S. plants and a 17.8 percent share of the country’s mattress sales.

Sealy sells the majority of its mattresses under its three main brands: Sealy Posturepedic, Stearns & Foster, and Bassett.

== Overseas markets ==
There are licensees operating in Australia, Argentina, Bahamas, Colombia, Israel, Jamaica, Japan, New Zealand, South Africa, Thailand and the United Kingdom.

- In 1995, direct export business began to South Korea.
- In 1996, Sealy began manufacturing and selling in Mexico.
- In 2001, Sealy began manufacturing and selling in its brand South Africa.
- In 2011, Sealy opened its first manufacturing plant in China. The 100,000-square-foot factory outside Shanghai is a joint venture of Sealy China, which is owned and operated by Sealy Inc., and licensee Sealy Australia.
