= István Pálfi =

Hungarian politician

István Pálfi (23 September 1966, Berettyóújfalu – 15 July 2006, Berettyóújfalu) was a Hungarian politician and Member of the European Parliament (MEP) with the Hungarian Civic Party, part of the European People's Party. He sat on the European Parliament's Committee on Budgetary Control and its Committee on Regional Development.

Pálfi was a substitute for the Committee on Budgets and a member of the Delegation to the EU-Ukraine Parliamentary Cooperation Committee.

He died after a long illness in his home town.

== Personal life ==
He was married. His wife was Anikó Pálfiné Pántya.

== Education ==
- 2002: Personnel Manager, University of Pécs
- International Relations Department, Budapest University of Economics (university leaving certificate, state examination in progress)

== Career ==
- 1994-1996: Various posts with tourism firms
- since 1996: Adult education and employment programmes
- since 1993: Berettyóújfalu town chairman of the FIDESZ party
- 1995-1996 and 1998-2000: Vice-Chairman of the regional steering committee, Hajdú-Bihar region
- 2000-2002: delegate, national steering committee
- Deputy Mayor, Berettyóújfalu
- 1998-2002: Chairman of the Economic Affairs Committee, Hajdú-Bihar Regional Authority
- 1999-2002: Member of the Northern Great Plain Regional Development Council, Chairman of the Human Resources Working Committee
- 2002-2004: Member of the Hungarian Parliament, member, Social and Family Affairs Committee, Chairman of the Supervisory Subcommittee

== See also ==
- 2004 European Parliament election in Hungary
