= Tempur-Pedic =

American mattress manufacturer

Coordinates: 38.0888°N 84.5190°W

Tempur-Pedic International Inc.
- Type: Subsidiary
- Industry: Mattresses and pillows
- Founded: 1992; 34 years ago
- Headquarters: Coldstream Research Campus, Lexington, Kentucky, US
- Parent: Somnigroup International (2012— )
- Website: tempurpedic.com

Tempur-Pedic International, Inc., part of Somnigroup International (formerly Tempur Sealy International), is a manufacturer and distributor of mattresses and pillows made from viscoelastic foam. The company is headquartered on the Coldstream Research Campus in Lexington, Kentucky, and has manufacturing plants in Duffield, Virginia; and Albuquerque, New Mexico.

== History ==
The first Tempur-Pedic mattress was introduced by Fagerdala World Foams, a Swedish technical foam firm. The brand was brought to the US in 1992 and the company Tempur-Pedic, Inc. was founded. (Note: However, Somnigroup's website states the company was founded in 1991.) Nine distributors of Fagerdala, including Tempur-Pedic, Inc., merged in 1999 to form Tempur World Holding Company, reformed in 2002 as Tempur-Pedic International Inc. The company went public in 2003. In 2012, Tempur-Pedic and Sealy Corporation announced plans to merge. Tempur-Pedic paid $228.6 million, but the two companies operate separately. The acquisition was completed March 18, 2013, and the company's name became Tempur Sealy International, Inc. on May 22, 2013.

Mattresses made of TEMPUR material earned the Good Housekeeping Seal, were awarded a Consumers Digest "best buy" as well as an Ease-of-Use Commendation from the Arthritis Foundation.

== Price fixing settlement ==
In 2015, Tempur-Pedic's German subsidiary was fined €15.5 million by the German Federal Cartel Office for engaging in vertical price fixing between August 2005 and July 2011.

== See also ==
- Foam mattress
- Foam rubber
- Sleep hygiene
