= Maliha Sami =

Maliha Sami also spelt Maleeha Sami is a former commercial pilot from Pakistan. In 1990, she became the first woman from the country to fly a commercial airliner as first officer (1990).

== Background ==
Sami is the only daughter amongst six siblings hailing from a conservative Muslim family from Quetta, Baluchistan, Pakistan.

== Career ==
Sami worked for the Civil Aviation Authority of Pakistan (CAA) for more than six years, where she flew small, twin-engine aircraft as a navigational co-pilot.

After 1989, Maliha was called by the Pakistan International Airlines to attend formal pilot training. Amongst her batch mates was Ayesha Rabia Naveed, who would go onto become the first woman to captain a commercial airliner. Sami flew her first flight as first officer in 1990. In February 1994, Maliha became the first Pakistani woman pilot to operate a scheduled wide-body Airbus A-300 flight, on the Karachi-Quetta-Islamabad run. Sami was also the first Pakistani woman pilot to operate a scheduled Fokker flight on the Karachi-Panjgur-Turbat-Gwadar sector in 1990. Maliha became first woman pilot in the company to fly an Airbus A310 in 1996.

Sami also attended several refresher and training courses in the United States. She has also attended an intensive three-week training program in Kuala Lmpur, Malaysia.
