= Shukriya Khanum =

Pakistani first female pilot

- Died: 14 May 2017; Lahore
- Education: Government College, Karachi
- Occupation: Pilot
- Organization: PIA
- Relatives: Dr. Shahid Masood

Shukriya Khanum (Urdu شکریہ خانم) (c.1935 – 14 May 2017, Lahore) was a Pakistani pilot. She was Pakistan's first woman to obtain a commercial pilot license on 12 July 1959. When Shukriya Khanum joined the country's sole airline, Pakistan International Airlines, female pilots were not permitted to fly commercial planes. Therefore, she accepted the position of flight instructor at PIA's training center, where she taught young cadets. She also took flying enthusiasts on joyrides at the Karachi Flying Club.

== Education ==
Shukriya graduated from Government College Lahore in 1959. Shukriya Khanum took her flying lessons from Lahore Flying Academy at Walton Airport, Lahore.

== Career ==
Shukriya obtained her flying license immediately after her graduation in July 1959. She started her career with the national airline, Pakistan International Airlines (PIA). However at that time, rules did not permit women to fly a commercial plane, so Shukriya took up a job of flying instructor at the PIA flight club where she taught flying to new cadets. Later she would also take flying enthusiasts on rides at the Karachi flying club.

In the late 1970s, when martial law was imposed, during the General Zia-ul-Haq regime, rules had become strict and many laws were implemented that objected the idea of men and women working in the same area and so Shukriya was barred from flying at all, as Zia's rules objected men and women from flying together. Shukriya was then restricted to the job of an on-ground flight instructor. During her career, Shukriya was not able to serve as a pilot. The first female commercial pilot, who could fly without any gender restrictions was Rabia, who obtained her license thirty years after Shukriya. In 1989, Rabia met Shukriya in Karachi. Shukriya was happy to see her and said in her own words "to focus on professionalism and never let anybody think that because you are a woman you cannot do that".

== Personal life ==
She never married.

== Death ==
Shukriya Khanum died on 14 May 2017 at the age of 82 in Lahore of liver cancer.
