= Ayesha Rabia Naveed =

Pakistani commercial pilot

Ayesha Rabia Naveed is a former commercial pilot from Pakistan who flew for the national airline, Pakistan International Airlines (PIA). In 2005, she became the first Pakistani woman to captain a scheduled commercial flight. In 2006 she was captain of the first all woman crew of a Pakistani passenger flight.

== Early life ==
Naveed's father was a doctor who flew as a hobby. Her uncle was an airline pilot. As a result, she would visit flying clubs frequently. She started learning flying at a young age.

== Career ==
Ayesha's inspiration was Shukriya Khanum, who was the first woman aviator in the country. Ayesha first got the Private Pilots' License. Then she got the Commercial Pilot's License.

In 1980, she applied for a pilot for the Pakistan International Airlines and was selected. She also served as the Air Traffic Controller at the Lahore Airport for the Civil Aviation Authority. During the conservative rule of General Zia-ul-Haq, Ayesha had to abort her training and instead opted to be the Sales and Marketing professional for the airline. In 1989 she was asked to attend pilot training. In 1990, she became the second woman to fly a commercial flight as a first officer. In 2005, Ayesha became the first Pakistani woman captain of a commercial airline. She had 6000 flying hours at that time. She retired in 2017 as a Captain of the Airbus A310. By the time of her retirement she had flown Fokker, Boeing 737, Boeing 747, Airbus 300 and Airbus 310.

== Career achievements ==
- First all-women crew flight (2006)
- First Pakistani woman captain of a commercial scheduled flight (2005)
- Fist Pakistan International Airlines woman pilot on Fokker F27.
- First woman captain on Fokker F27.
- Flown to all destinations covered by the Pakistan International Airlines
- Member of Pakistan Airline Pilots Association Club (PALPA)
