= Pakistan International Airlines Flight 259 =

2013 aviation accident in Oman

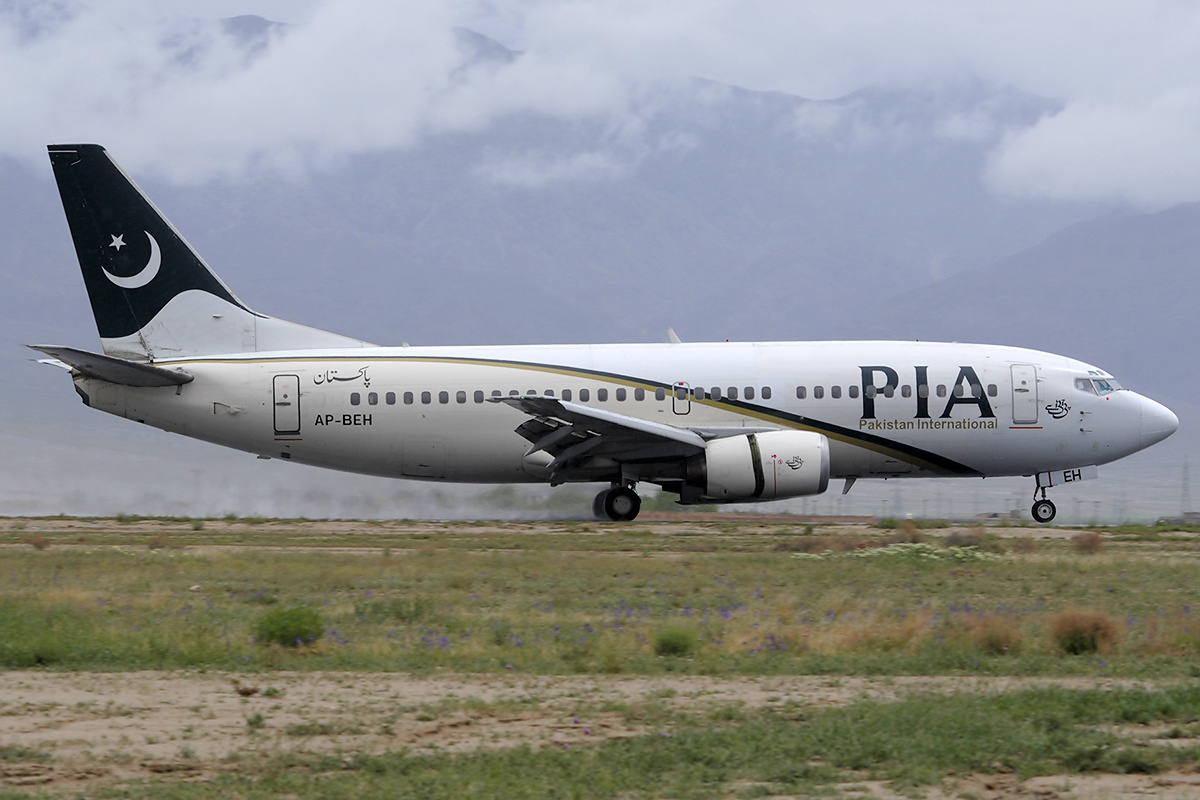
- AP-BEH, the aircraft involved in this accident, pictured in 2011

Accident
- Date: February 11, 2013
- Summary: Technical fault due to a mechanical failure of the left main gear
- Site: Muscat International Airport, Oman; 23°35′35.8″N 58°17′4.0″E

Aircraft
- Aircraft type: Boeing 737-33A
- Operator: Pakistan International Airlines
- IATA flight No.: PK259
- ICAO flight No.: PIA259
- Call sign: PAKISTAN 259
- Registration: AP-BEH
- Flight origin: Islamabad International Airport
- Stopover: Sialkot International Airport
- Destination: Muscat International Airport
- Occupants: 114
- Passengers: 107
- Crew: 7
- Fatalities: 0
- Injuries: 7
- Survivors: 114

Pakistan International Airlines Flight 259 was a scheduled passenger flight from Islamabad International Airport in Pakistan to Muscat International Airport in Oman, with a stopover at Sialkot International Airport in Pakistan. On 11 February 2013, a Boeing 737-33A operated by Pakistan International Airlines had a left main gear collapse while landing on Runway 26L, causing the engine to scrape and come to rest on the left side of the runway with No. 1 engine contacting the runway surface. The damage was severe enough that the aircraft was declared a total loss (written off).

== Aircraft and Crew ==
=== Crew ===
The pilot in command was 55-year-old Captain Muhummed Arif; he had a total of 12,239 hours of flying experience on the Boeing 737-33A. The first officer was 39-year-old First Officer Muhummed Iqbal; he had a total of 1,924 hours of flying experience on the Boeing 737-33A.

=== Aircraft ===
The aircraft involved was a Boeing 737-33A, manufactured in 1992, registration AP-BEH, operated by Pakistan International Airlines, Serial number 25504/2341, powered by two CFM International CFM56-3B2.

== Accident ==
The Boeing 737-33A registered AP-BEH had a left main gear collapse while landing at Runway 26L at Muscat International Airport on 11 February 2013. The No. 1 engine contacted the runway, and the aircraft came to a rest on the left side of the runway. All 114 occupants evacuated, and the plane was declared a total loss (written off).

== Investigation ==
The accident was investigated by the Pakistan Civil Aviation Authority (PakCAA) in coordination with Omani aviation authorities. The investigation focused on the left main landing gear collapse. Examination revealed excessive play at the joints of the torsion links and the shimmy damper mechanism, which caused a shimmy event leading to the gear collapse. The aircraft was subsequently written off, and no injuries were reported among the 114 occupants.

=== Cause ===
The incident took place due to the shimmy of the left main landing gear. The excessive play at joints to torsion links and the shimmy damper mechanism was the cause of the shimmy event.

== See also ==
- Southwest Airlines Flight 345
- Aeroméxico Connect Flight 2431
