= Precision Engineering Complex =

Pakistani aircraft maintenance & manufacturing company

- Trade name: PECPL
- Type: SEO
- Industry: Aerospace; Commercial aviation
- Founded: 1980; 46 years ago
- Founder: Pakistan International Airlines
- Headquarters: Karachi, Sindh, Pakistan
- Area served: Worldwide
- Key people: AVM Mehr Yar Niazi (Director)
- Products: Commercial aviation and aerospace components
- Production output: 1980–present (1980)
- Services: Automotive and Aircraft maintenance
- Owner: Ministry of Defence Production

The Precision Engineering Complex (PEC) is a Pakistani aerospace and manufacturing contractor of the aerospace components and parts, headquartered in Karachi, Sindh, Pakistan.

The PEC machines and manufactures machined elements and components of the GE, Boeing, and Airbus commercial aircraft as a local support engineering representative for the Pakistan International Airlines (PIA).

Until 2025, the PEC was a managed under the contract of the Pakistan International Airlines Holding Company Limited (PIAHCL), and is now entirely under the management of Pakistan Air Force under the contract Precision Engineering Complex (Private) Limited.

== Overview ==
The Precision Engineering Complex (PEC) was established and headquartered in Jinnah Terminal as an engineering and business division of the Pakistan International Airlines (PIA) in 1980. The PEC is an integrated complex that focuses on precised engineering, manufacturing, and machining of the extremely low-tolerance aerospace components and machine elements for the aerospace and automotive industry customers in the region. The PEC capabilities encompass various industrial disciplines, including CAM/CAD, investment casting, numerical control (NC), electrical discharge machining (EDM), and computerized numerical control (CNC) machining, optics, printed circuit boards (PCB) manufacturing, electrical and electronics, and composites material machining.

In 2014, the PEC attained certification to address the quality control and assurance from the American Boeing, General Electric, and the European Airbus Industries for its machinability capabilities and services.

== Corporate affairs ==
From 1980 until the 2025, the Precision Engineering Complex (PEC) was an engineering and business unit of the Pakistan International Airlines (PIA) and was managed under contract as PIA Holding Company Limited (PIAHCL), registered in PSX as PIAHCL. The PIA controlled the business revenues and the engineering services until 2025 when the Government of Pakistan approved the transfer of ownership from PIA to the Pakistan Air Force as part of the broader government-led restructuring and privatization effort concerning the national flag carrier, the PIA.

The PEC is now managed and operated entirely by the Pakistan Air Force under the Precision Engineering Complex (Private) Limited contract, with PSX registration as "PECPL.
