= Pakistan International Airlines =

National airline of Pakistan

Pakistan International Airlines پاکستان انٹرنیشنل ایئر لائنز pākistān intarnaishnal e'ar lā'inzfleet

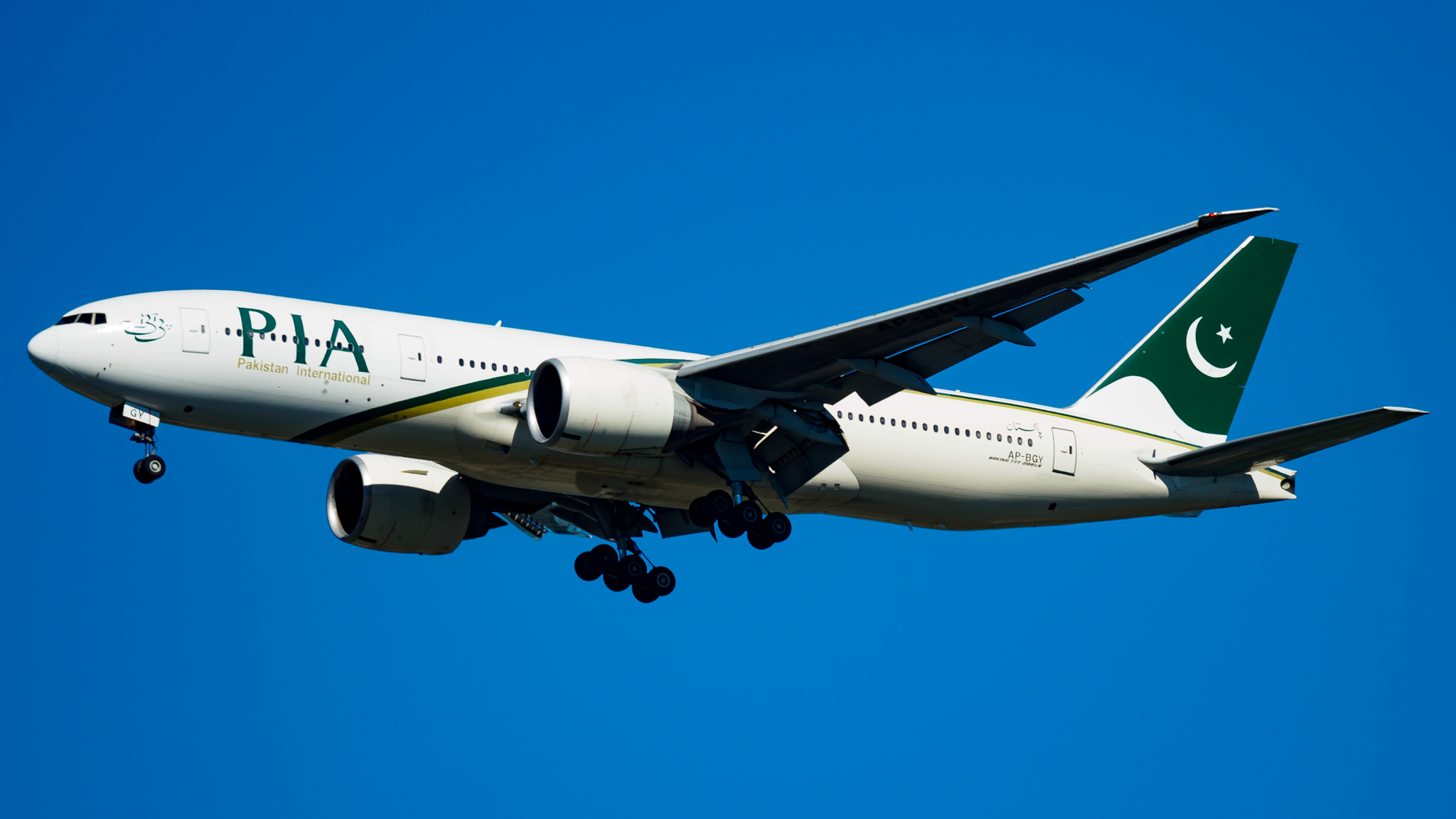
- PIA Boeing 777-200LR in 2017
IATA	ICAO	Call sign
PK	PIA	PAKISTAN
- Founded: 29 October 1946; 80 years ago (as Orient Airways)
- Commenced operations: 11 March 1955; 71 years ago (as Pakistan International Airlines)
- Hubs: Karachi
- Secondary hubs: Islamabad; Lahore
- Frequent-flyer program: Awards Plus
- Fleet size: 37
- Destinations: 50
- Parent company: Arif Habib Consortium (100%)
- Traded as: PSX: PIAHCLA
- Headquarters: Jinnah International Airport, Karachi
- Key people: Lt. Gen. (Retd) Anwar Ali Hyder (chairman); Adrian Hamilton-Manns (CEO)
- Revenue: ▲ Rs. 200 billion (US$720 million) (2025)
- Operating income: ▲ Rs. 133 billion (US$480 million) (2025)
- Net income: ▲ Rs. 150 billion (US$540 million) (2025)
- Total assets: ▲ Rs. 191 billion (US$680 million) (2025)
- Employees: 6,500 (2025)
- Website: www.piac.com.pk

Pakistan International Airlines (PIA) is the national flag carrier of Pakistan. With its primary hub at Jinnah International Airport in Karachi, the airline also operates from its secondary hubs at Allama Iqbal International Airport in Lahore and at Islamabad International Airport. Until its privatization in 2025, the airline was managed and operated as a state-owned enterprise under the Aviation Division of the federal Government of Pakistan.

Founded on 29 October 1946 by Mirza Ishpahani and Adamjee Dawood as Orient Airways, the airline was initially a private entity and based in Calcutta in British India, before shifting operations to the newly independent state of Pakistan in August 1947. Soon, Orient Airways was nationalized to form the Pakistan International Airlines Corporation (PIAC). The airline commenced international services in 1955 to London, via Cairo and Rome. In 1964, it became the first non-Communist airline to fly to China. PIA assisted in the establishment of Emirates in 1985 and became the launch customer of the Boeing 777-200LR in 2004. On 10 November 2005, PIA completed the world's longest nonstop commercial passenger flight using a Boeing 777-200LR, flying eastbound from Hong Kong to London in 22 hours and 22 minutes.

PIA is Pakistan's largest airline and operates a fleet of 32 aircraft, Mostly various Boeing 777 types, Airbus A320 and ATR aircraft. The airline operates a frequent flyer program, Awards +Plus. It is not part of any airline alliance. The airline operates nearly 50 flights daily, servicing 20 domestic destinations and 28 international destinations across Asia, Europe, the Middle East and North America. In addition to commercial flight operations, PIA also owns the Sofitel Paris, The Scribe Hotel in Paris, and The Roosevelt Hotel in New York City. The Roosevelt is now used as a homeless shelter.

The Government of Pakistan's report in 2020 emphasised that after Air Marshals Nur Khan and Asghar Khan—whose tenures were regarded in aviation circles as the "Golden Age of PIA"—departed from their leadership roles, the airline began a downward trajectory, suffering billions in losses. Its assets declined, disciplinary issues escalated, and unions indirectly took control of management. Aircraft that were capable of flying were grounded, and repairable equipment was neglected. From 30 June 2020 until 29 November 2024, PIA was banned from flying in European airspace after EASA determined that the airline was not capable of certifying and overseeing its operators and aircraft in accordance with applicable international standards. This decision, which was also implemented at various dates in other non-EU territories, was made soon after it was revealed that at least a fourth of all pilots' licences issued in Pakistan were not genuine.

Following prolonged financial losses, governance issues, and international operational restrictions, Pakistan International Airlines was privatised in 2025, ending direct government ownership and transferring majority control to the private sector.

== Early years ==
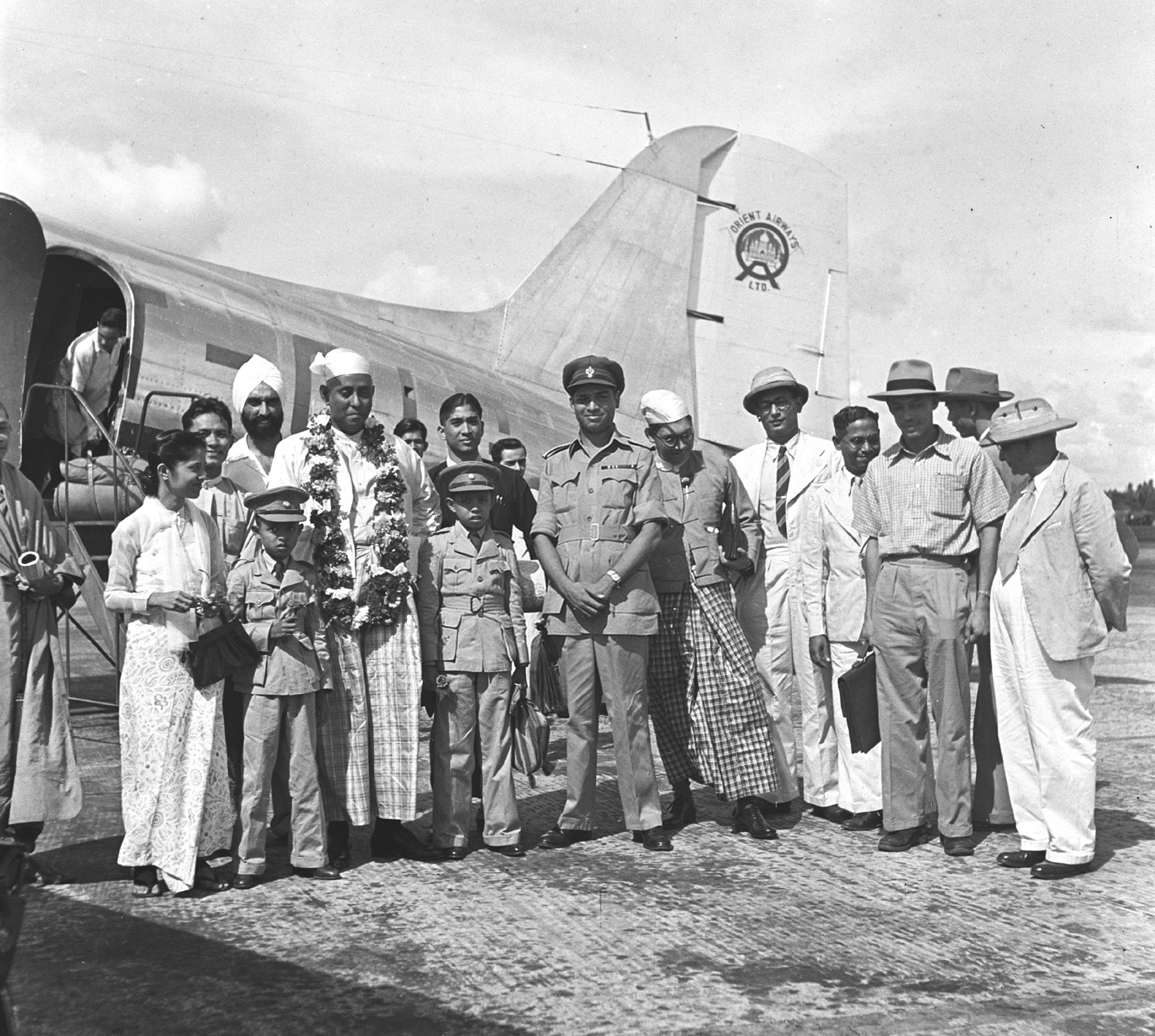
Passenger and bystanders in front of an Orient Airways Douglas DC-3 on the occasion of the arrival of the Burmese High Commissioner to India at Calcutta Airport, circa 1947

Pakistan International Airlines can trace its origins to the days when Pakistan had not gained independence and was still part of the British Raj until 1947. In the early 1930s, Imperial Airways operated its long-haul routes by creating a lot of small airports across Africa and Asia. The Handley Page H.P.42 aircraft was Imperial Airways' first major success, as it was specially designed to handle operations from unprepared ground.

In 1945, the country's founder Muhammad Ali Jinnah recognised the need for a flag carrier for the future nation and sought financial help from wealthy businessmen Mirza Ahmad Ispahani and Adamjee Haji Dawood. As a result, the new airline, Orient Airways, was registered in Kolkata (then known as Calcutta) on 23 October 1946. Orient became the first and only Muslim-owned airline in the British Raj.

In February 1947, the airline bought three Douglas DC-3 aircraft and obtained a licence to fly in May of the same year. The airline started its operations on 30 June 1947, offering services in British India from Calcutta to Sittwe and Rangoon (present-day Yangon).

== Post-independence ==
On 14 August 1947, Pakistan gained independence and Orient Airways started relief operations for the new country. The airline was entrusted with the task of servicing air routes between East and West Pakistan. By 1949, Orient acquired three Convair CV-240s to service the Karachi-Delhi-Kolkata-Dhaka route and became the first Asian airline to operate Convair aircraft.

=== 1950s ===
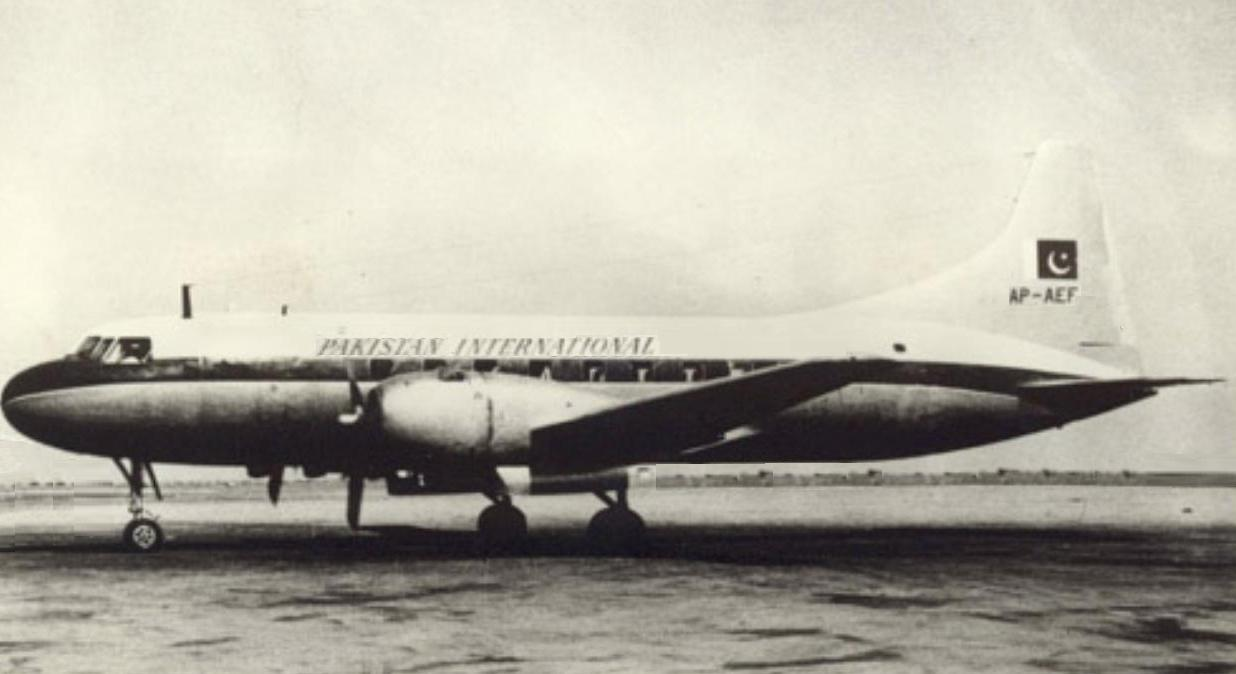
A Convair CV-240 at Karachi airport, circa 1950

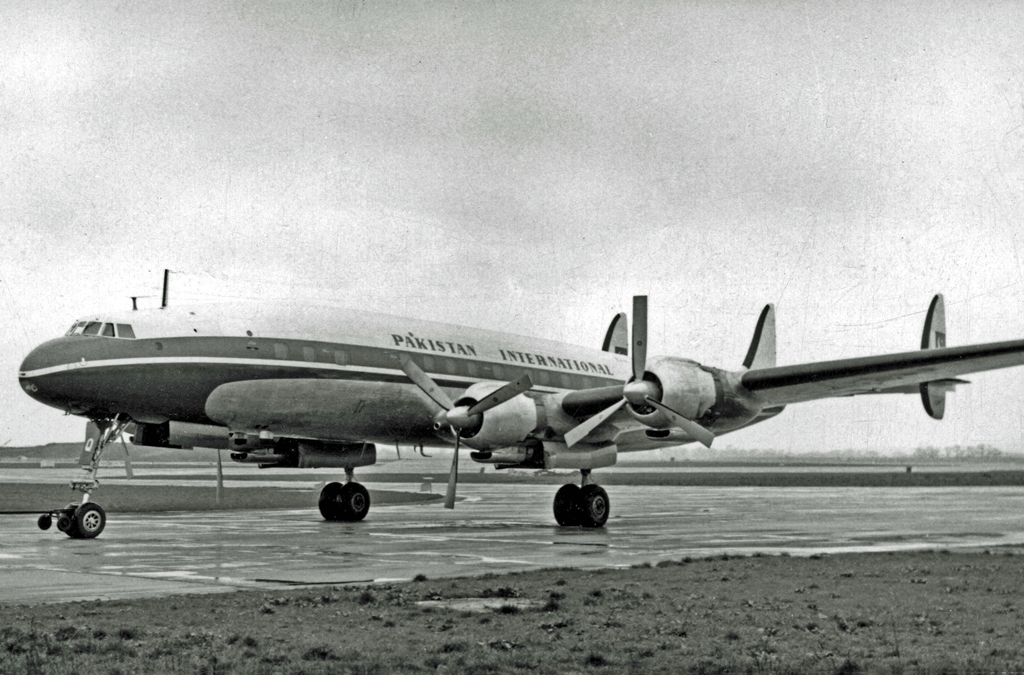
A A Lockheed 1049C Super Constellation at London Heathrow Airport, 1955

Orient Airways traffic continuously declined until 1953 as British Overseas Airways Corporation (BOAC) had been granted rights to carry passengers between East Pakistan and West Pakistan, while two other local competitors also began serving Orient routes. As a result of losses, the Pakistani government began subsidising Orient's operations through a 1952 contract for the purchase of three Lockheed L-1049 Super Constellations registered to the government's newly established subsidiary, Pakistan International Airlines (PIA), at the cost of 25 million rupees. PIA had been established as a department of the Pakistan Civil Aviation Authority, and was tasked with operation and maintenance of the new Lockheed aircraft.

Pakistan's government established the Pakistan International Airlines Corporation through the merger of Orient Airways with Pakistan International Airlines on 1 October 1953 by an interim joint operating agreement in which the government assumed financial control of the airline, while Orient's operations and ground assets could be complemented by the aircraft of Pakistan International Airlines – although Orient Airways continued to operate under its name for a few more years.

Pakistan's Ministry of Defence took over operations from the Civil Aviation Authority in early 1954, while the chairman of Orient Airways became the CEO of PIA, and foreign staff brought in to help relaunch the airline. On 7 June 1954, Orient Airways began nonstop flight services between East and West Pakistan, with service from Karachi to Dhaka using Pakistan International Airlines' Lockheed aircraft that had been ordered in 1952 and delivered in early 1954. The route was subsidised by the government so that middle-class Pakistanis could afford to fly the route, with rates that may have been the lowest in the world at the time. The airline also introduced two new domestic routes: Karachi–Lahore–Peshawar and Karachi–Quetta–Lahore.

On 11 March 1955, Orient Airways and Pakistan International Airlines were formally merged as part of the Pakistan International Airlines Corporation Ordinance, 1955. Orient Airways ceased operations while the Government of Pakistan took a majority holding in the airline. The new PIA had a fleet of three L-I049C Super Constellations, two Convair CV-240s, and eleven DC-3s.

The newly relaunched airline also inaugurated its first international route, Karachi–London Heathrow via Cairo and Rome, using the newly acquired Lockheed L-1049C Super Constellations. The airline continued using DC-3s on domestic routes in Pakistan. PIA carried 113,165 passengers in 1955 – 50% higher than in 1954.

In May 1956, PIA ordered five Vickers Viscount 815s. The airline also entered into a partnership with PanAm to train PIA's personnel in 1956. In 1957–1958, passenger numbers rose to 208,000, necessitating the purchase of two additional Lockheed Super Constellations. The appointment of Air Marshal Nur Khan as the managing director of PIA in 1959 heralded an era of success for PIA.

=== 1960s ===
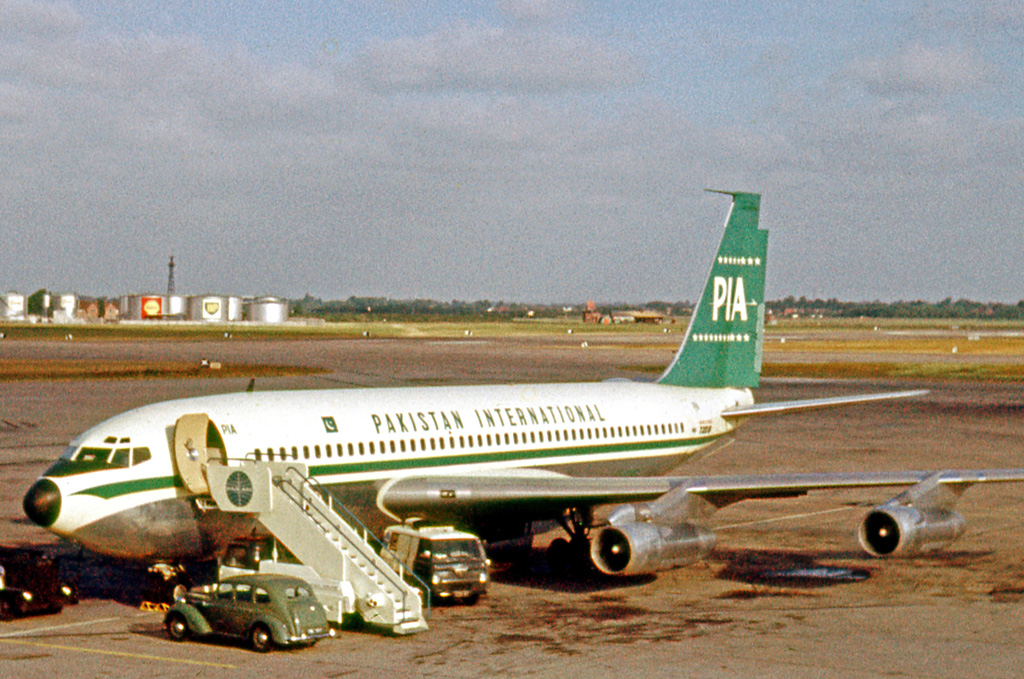
A Boeing 720 at London Heathrow Airport in 1962

In February 1960, PIA wet-leased a Boeing 707 from Pan American Airlines and introduced it onto the Karachi-London route on 7 March 1960 initially using Pan Am pilots, thereby becoming the second Asian airline to induct and commercially operate a jet aircraft in its fleet after Air India. An all-Pakistani crew began operation of the 707 from 20 June 1960 onwards. By the end of 1960, PIA, for the first time, entered financial profitability.

With the newly acquired aircraft, the airline introduced its first trans-Atlantic route Karachi-New York JFK (then known as Idlewild) via London Heathrow on 5 May 1961, which was suspended in February 1963. In 1961, it expanded its fleet by placing orders for 3 Boeing 720s, which were delivered in 1962. On 2 January 1962, a PIA Boeing 720B flown by Captain Abdullah Beg from London to Karachi established a world record for speed over a commercial airline route of 938.78 km/h (582.98 mph), a record which still holds to this day. Fokker F27 Friendships, and Sikorsky helicopters were also ordered and delivered in 1963, with the helicopters used to provide air service to 20 towns in East Pakistan until 1966.

The helicopters were retired in 1966 and a reduced network of eight cities was served by Fokker F27 aircraft. Upon the establishment of ties between Pakistan and the People's Republic of China, PIA started flying the Dhaka-Guangzhou-Shanghai route on 29 April 1964, becoming the first airline of a non-communist country flying to the People's Republic of China. On 10 May 1964, PIA became the first non-Soviet airline offering flights to Europe via Moscow.

At the outbreak of the Indo-Pakistani War of 1965, the Pakistani Armed Forces used PIA's services for logistics and transport purposes. The Viscounts were phased out in 1966 and were replaced by four Hawker Siddeley Tridents.

PIA's route network grew rapidly in the mid to late 1960s: Dhahran was added in 1962, while Cairo services resumed. In 1966, Paris, Istanbul, Baghdad, Kuwait, Jeddah and Nairobi were added to PIA's routes. Bangkok was added in 1967, while Manila, Tokyo, and Damascus were added in 1969.

During a news conference in Karachi on 11 May 1967, Air Marshal Asghar Khan announced that the airline had become the fifth largest profit-making airline in the world, carrying one million passengers annually. At a press conference held at the PIA headquarters in Karachi in July 1967, Asghar Khan announced plans for the construction of a series of small hotels in major cities and resort areas across the country, with a total investment of PKR 44.5 million (approximately $9,345,000). The project included building 64-room hotels in Sylhet, Sargodha, Sukkur, Mohenjo-daro, Chitral, Gilgit, and Kaptai, and 88-room hotels in Khulna, Lyallpur, Multan, and Murree, with an additional 20 cottages attached to the new 644 room Kaptai Hotel. Furthermore, Peshawar and Chittagong will each have hotels with 125 rooms.

These establishments are designed to be European-style motels equipped with modern amenities such as air conditioning, heating, parking facilities, and swimming pools. The cost of rooms would range from twenty to thirty Pakistani rupees, approximately four to five dollars per person, depending on the room type. The hotels were completed in 1970. A new holding company was established to attract domestic investment for this venture, in addition to forming small companies in the cities where the hotels will be located. For the foreign exchange portion, which constitutes 20% of the total cost, successful discussions were conducted with the Export-Import Bank. The entire project relied on private investment, with no financial participation from the Government of Pakistan. Air Marshal Asghar Khan mentioned that the PIA Board of Directors approved an investment of approximately Rs. 10 million for the project. Pakistan Services Ltd., which operated the Intercontinental hotel chain, contributed significantly. Local municipal bodies were approached for investment as well. Bechtel Corp. of New York prepared the design and cost estimates for the proposed motels. To ensure cost-effectiveness and timely execution, it was recommended that a standardised design be used for all the motels, utilising local materials, equipment, and expertise as much as possible.

=== 1970s ===
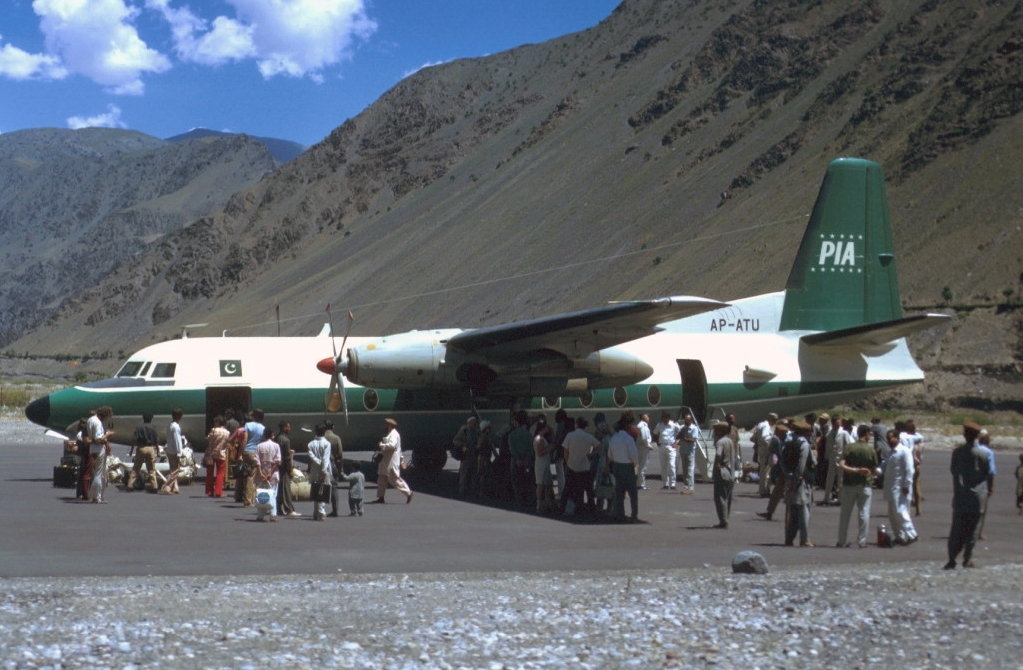
A Fokker F-27 Friendship at Chitral Airport in 1972

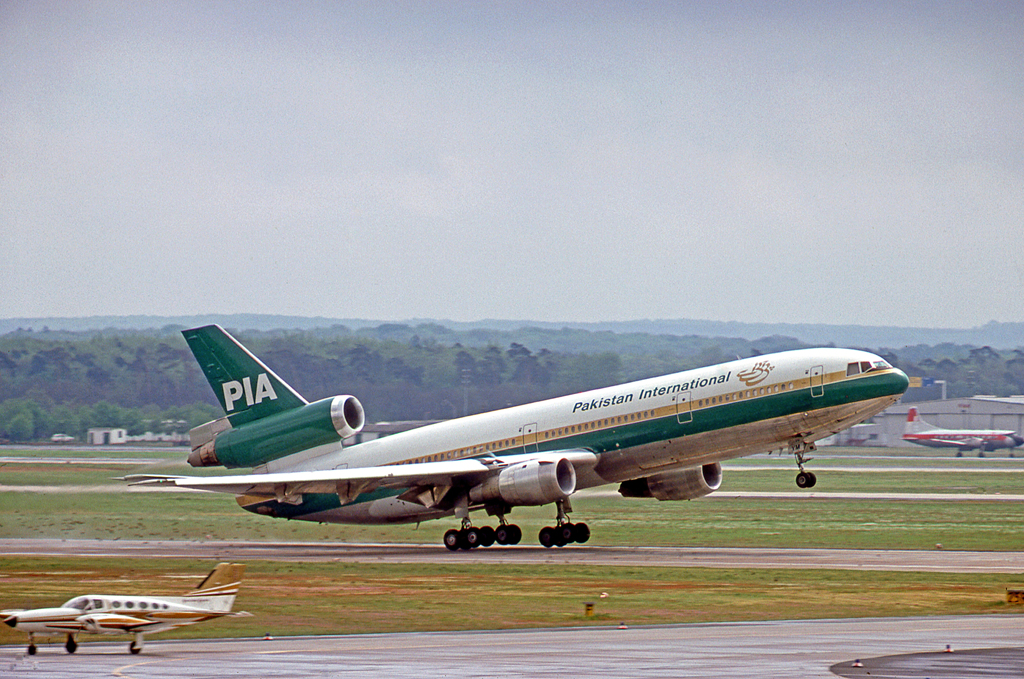
A Douglas DC-10-30 taking off from Frankfurt Airport, circa 1977

On 3 December 1971, a French national's attempt to hijack a PIA flight from Paris to Karachi was thwarted by French security forces. Transatlantic flights to New York City were resumed in May 1972 with a stopover in Europe. With the establishment of cordial ties between the Libyan and Pakistani governments in the early 1970s, PIA added Tripoli to its network in 1972. PIA also signed an agreement with Yugoslav airline JAT (today known as Air Serbia) in 1972 to lease two PIA Boeing 707s to JAT.

PIA acquired McDonnell Douglas DC-10s in 1973 to replace its remaining Boeing 707-300s. Nur Khan was appointed as PIA executive for the second term in 1974. In 1974, PIA launched Pakistan International Cargo, offering air freight and cargo services.

The latter half of the decade witnessed a further expansion of PIA's fleet with the introduction of Boeing 747s, with its first two aircraft leased from TAP Air Portugal in 1976. By 1976–7, PIA carried 2.2 million passengers, compared to 698,000 in 1972–3. Revenues in 1976 rose sharply compared to 1975, with the airline revenues of $134 million in the July–December period of 1976. On 20 January 1978, a PIA Fokker 27 was hijacked en route to Karachi from Sukkur.

For the first time since its inauguration, PIA started providing technical and administrative assistance or leased aircraft to foreign airlines including Air China, Air Malta, Choson Minhang (today known as Air Koryo), Philippine Airlines, Somali Airlines, and Yemenia. A subsidiary of PIA also started providing hotel management services in the United Arab Emirates towards the end of the decade. Political upheaval in Pakistan in the late 1970s began to impact PIA's operations negatively.

Tim Clark previously worked at the airline before moving on to the newly-found Emirates.

=== 1980s ===
The 1980s saw a continuation of PIA growth. The decade began with the opening of a cargo handling centre at Karachi airport, duty-free shops, the first C and D safety checks on its entire fleet, as well as the introduction of the airline's first Airbus A300B4-200 aircraft. In 1981, PIA had an employee workforce of almost 24,000, which despite being reduced to 20,000 by 1983 still resulted in PIA having the world's highest ratio of employees to aircraft. PIA's operations became increasingly de-centralised during the early 1980s, with responsibilities being split between new departments. Despite de-centralisation, PIA reported its highest ever profits in 1981-82, followed by record profits again in 1983-84.

In 1984, the airline introduced the Night Coach service as a low-cost alternative to day-time domestic flights. In the following years, PIA Planetarium was inaugurated in Karachi which was followed by planetaria in Lahore and Peshawar. These planetariums featured retired PIA aircraft on display for educational and observational purposes. Two more retired Boeing 720B aircraft were donated to the planetaria in Karachi and later on Lahore. PIA profits again rose in 1984–5.

In June 1985, PIA became the first Asian airline to operate the Boeing 737-300 aircraft, after six of the aircraft were delivered. Pakistan International Airlines also played a significant role in establishing UAE's Emirates airline in 1985 by providing technical and administrative assistance to the new carrier as well as leasing a new Boeing 737–300 and an Airbus A300B4-200. In late 1987 and early 1988, services to Malé, Manchester, and Toronto were introduced.

=== 1990s ===
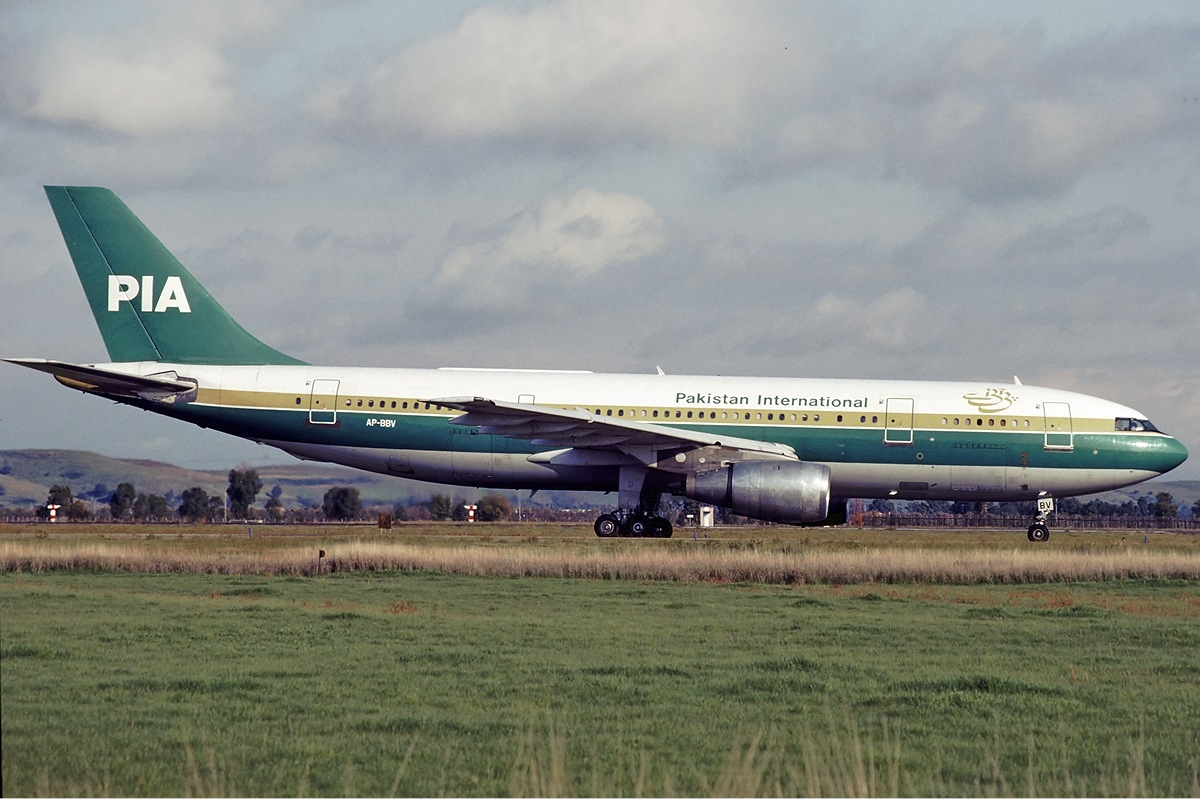
An Airbus A300 at Leonardo da Vinci-Fiumicino, circa 1991

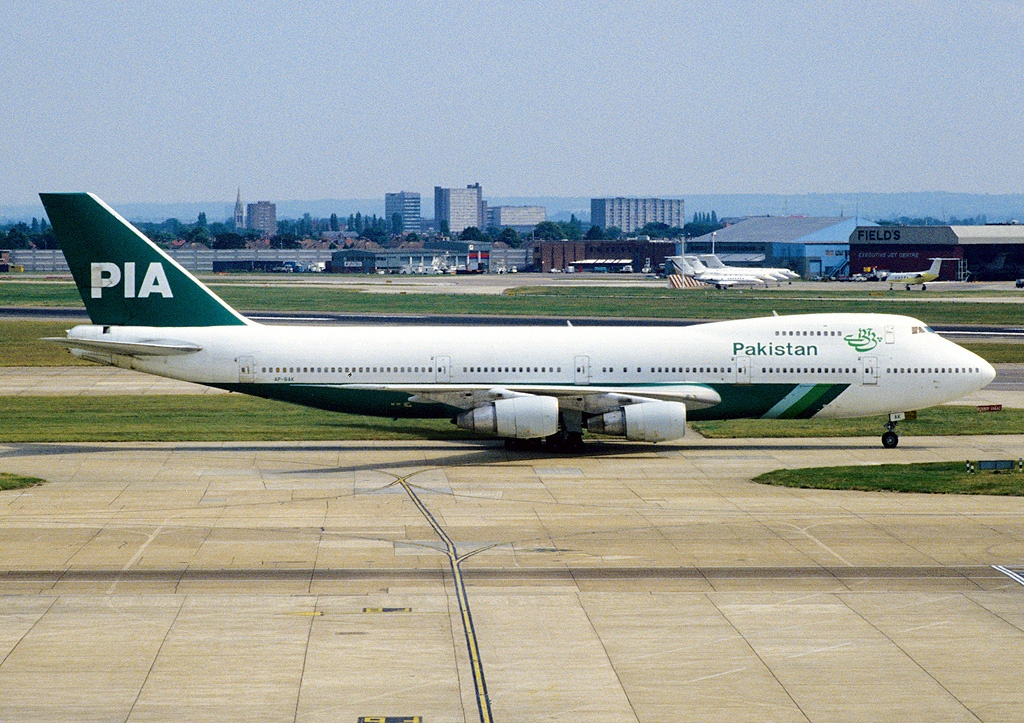
A Boeing 747 Combi taxiing at London Heathrow International Airport in 1992

PIA began to sustain operating losses and liquidity problems throughout the 1990s due to frequent pilot strikes, issues with various vendors, over-staffing, and political interference in airline management. In 1990, First Officer Maliha Sami became the first female pilot of PIA when she took off on the Karachi-Panjgur-Turbat-Gwadar route. In June 1991, PIA took delivery of its first of six Airbus A310-300s. With the new aircraft, the airline introduced flights to Tashkent in 1992 and to Zürich in 1993.

In March 1993, AVM Farooq Umar became managing director of the airline. An Open Skies agreement between Karachi to Dubai was agreed upon in 1993, and 12 private airlines were allowed to operate domestically in Pakistan. Both steps came simultaneously and put enormous pressure on PIA's financial performance, though PIA launched six new routes to the Persian Gulf and CIS countries, along with a tourist 'Air Safari' scenic flight over the Karakoram Mountains in 1994. Non-stop flights from Lahore and Islamabad to JFK and Canada were launched, while PIA added Jakarta, Fujairah, Baku, and Al-Ain to its network in 1994. In addition, PIA became a client of three flight reservation systems, namely: SABRE, Galileo, and Amadeus.

A Tupolev Tu-154 aircraft was also leased briefly in 1996 to cope with a surge in passenger traffic during summer 1996. Flights to Beirut were resumed the same year as well before being discontinued a few years later. In 1999, PIA leased five Boeing 747–300 aircraft from Cathay Pacific to replace its Boeing 747-200M fleet. The aircraft were painted with a new livery, a handwork Pashmina tail, on white body and large Pakistan titles on the front fuselage. The livery was adopted in the early 90s but due to some copyright issues, it was dropped. The Boeing 747-300s continued to bear the new livery, but with a plain green tail with PIA titles. The other aircraft in the fleet were repainted in early 1990s livery.

=== 2000s ===
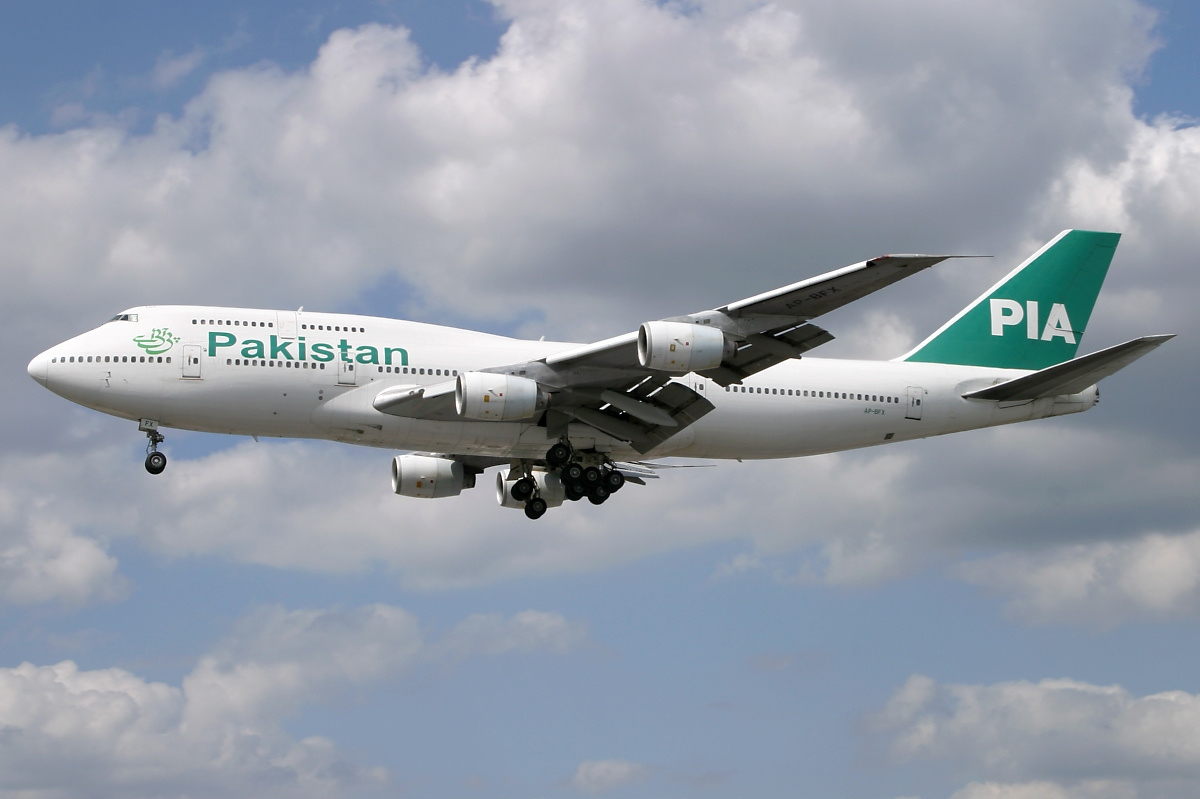
Boeing 747–300, circa 2003

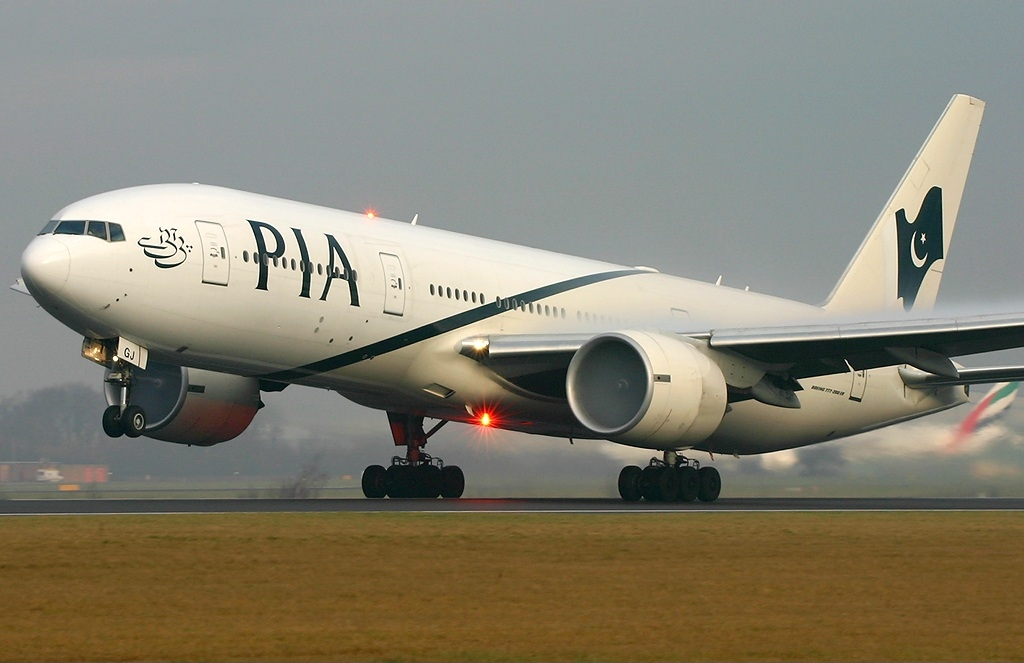
Boeing 777-200ER, circa 2006

The War in Afghanistan following the attacks on 11 September 2001 negatively impacted PIA's operations as Afghan airspace was closed. However, following the restructuring of the airline under new management in April 2001, the airline again became profitable. Cost per employee dropped 24% between 2000 and 2003, and lower engineering and maintenance costs led to enhanced airline revenue.

In July 2002, PIA purchased six Boeing 747–300 aircraft from Cathay Pacific, five of which were already on lease. The sixth one arrived shortly afterwards and was used mainly on its North American and European routes. In October 2002, after ten years without any new orders, the airline placed an order for eight Boeing 777 aircraft. The order included all three variants of 777, i.e. three 777-200ER (Extended Range), two 777-200LR (Longer Range), and three 777-300ER versions. PIA was the launch customer that revived the Boeing 777-200LR project that, until then, only had three orders.

Boeing delivered the first of three 777-200ER aircraft to PIA in January 2004, and PIA introduced a new livery for the 777-200ERs that was applied to most of its fleet. PIA also leased six more Airbus A310-300 aircraft directly from Airbus. On 3 November 2005, PIA placed an order to purchase seven ATR 42-500 aircraft to replace its ageing fleet of Fokker F27 Friendships. On 10 November 2005, PIA used the 777-200LR to fly the world's longest flight by a commercial airliner, flying over 21,000 kilometres on an eastbound flight from Hong Kong to London for 22 hours and 22 minutes – a record which still stands as of late 2019. On 6 December 2005, PIA acquired another new Boeing 777-200ER on a ten-year lease. The same year, Ayesha Rabia Naveed became the first Pakistani woman to captain a scheduled commercial flight. The following year, she captained a flight with the first all-woman crew. On 23 December 2006, PIA took delivery of its first Boeing 777-300ER. The remaining aircraft were delivered in January 2007.

On 25 February 2006, Boeing delivered its first 777-200LR to PIA. ATR delivered two of the seven ordered ATR 42s to PIA in May and December 2006 respectively, following which the airline ceased using military Lockheed C-130 Hercules for passenger services in northern areas of Pakistan. The military aircraft were being used after the PIA Flight 688 accident.

Under the careful supervision and guidance of Mr. Syed Shah, who was serving as the Station Manager at the time, Pakistan International Airlines (PIA) initiated the induction of long-range 777 aircraft into its fleet. This pivotal move allowed PIA to offer non-stop flights from Toronto to Karachi, Islamabad, and Lahore, beginning on 3 March 2006.

The introduction of the long-range 777 aircraft into PIA's fleet marked a significant milestone in the airline's history.

As a result of this strategic decision, PIA was able to offer a more efficient and seamless travel experience for its passengers, enabling them to travel non-stop to their desired destinations in Pakistan. This move also positioned PIA as a prominent player in the aviation industry, further cementing its reputation as a reliable and customer-centric airline. PIA had also planned non-stop flights to New York City, Chicago, Washington, and Houston but was not permitted by US authorities (unless the airline implemented a European stopover on the flight to American cities) due to security concerns after 9/11.

A PIA flight from Multan crashed in July 2006, killing 45. A government inquiry afterward blamed aging aircraft for the crash. Houston services also ended in 2006. Following the crash, on 5 March 2007, the European Commission banned all but 9 of PIA's 42-strong fleet from flying to Europe, citing safety concerns over its ageing aircraft. The fleet of Boeing 777s was exempted from the ban, but 15 aircraft were over 20 years old by this point. PIA claimed that the ban was discriminatory and unjustifiable.

The ban on some of the aircraft was lifted after four months on 5 July 2007, following an inspection by the European Union Air Safety Administration. Of the eleven aircraft allowed to resume operations to the EU, five were Boeing 747-300s, and the remaining six were Airbus A310-300s. On 29 November 2007, the EU completely removed the ban, and PIA's entire fleet was permitted to fly to Europe.

=== 2010s ===
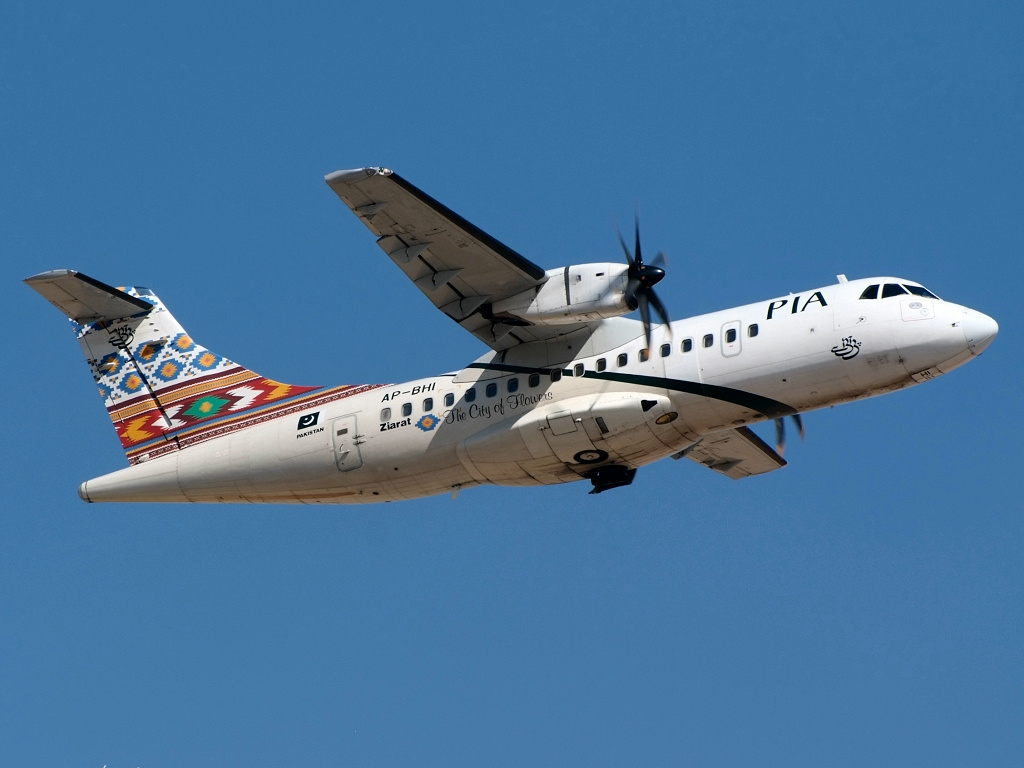
An ATR 42-500 with tail livery dedicated to Balochistan province in 2011

In 2010, PIA altered its livery. The tail design was replaced with a much larger version of the Pakistan national flag and added the text "Pakistan International" in gold writing underneath the large billboard-style PIA on the fuselage. The green stripe was modified to include gold and was extended to the rear of the fuselage.

By 2011, PIA began to be unprofitable again, requiring government subsidies.

In 2014, PIA leased four Boeing 737-800s. PIA also issued a request for tender for four Boeing 777-300ERs, however, the bids for the 777s were not accepted. The airline did lease Airbus A320 aircraft and inducted two A320-214s in its fleet in 2014. Another wet-leased A320-211s joined PIA on 11 August 2014. In October 2014, the airline again wet-leased three Boeing 737-800s, and it also accepted bids to dry lease five ATR 72–500s for eight years. In 2015, after serving PIA for 16 years, the last of PIA's Boeing 747-300s were phased out.

In early 2016, PIA was fundamentally grounded for an entire week as employees walked out en masse following the deaths of two employees in a demonstration against the airline's privatisation. In August 2016, PIA launched a new "Premier Service" for flights to London, using an Airbus A330-300 wet-leased from SriLankan Airlines. The wet-lease period ended after six months, and as a result, the A330-300 was returned to SriLankan Airlines, and the Premier Service discontinued. By the end of 2016, the airline was saddled with $3 billion in debt.

In January 2017, PIA retired all of the Airbus A310-300s from its fleet. For replacement, PIA leased four Boeing 737-800s from Pegasus Airlines, which were returned later on completion of the lease period. After over 50 years of service, PIA service to New York ended in October 2017 as a result of TSA regulation preventing nonstop flights from Pakistan and the US, leaving Toronto as PIA's only destination in North America – which continues to be served by nonstop flights from Karachi, Lahore, and Islamabad.

In 2017, PIA decided to replace its reservation and ticketing system "Sabre" with a Turkish-origin system called "Hitit". Both PIA & Hitit signed an agreement and in September 2018, the airline successfully switched to the new system. At the end of 2018, the airline was burdened with $3.3 billion in debt, up from $2.97 billion the year before, and thus requiring government bailouts for continued operation. With the demise of Shaheen Air, PIA launched routes that had previously been served only by Shaheen.

New profitable routes were launched in 2019, with profitable routes such as Karachi-Toronto saw increased frequencies. Meanwhile, six unprofitable routes were discontinued in 2019. In April 2019, PIA claimed that its revenues almost matched operating costs. Later that year following a visit of TSA officials to the Islamabad International Airport in July 2019, PIA expressed hope that non-stop flights to the US would be permitted. In August 2019, PIA laid off 1,000 "redundant employees". In September, PIA announced that it would lease additional aircraft to increase the airline's fleet to 37 by 2020, and 45 by 2023. By the end of 2019, PIA reported a 41% increase in year-on-year revenue due to discontinuation of unprofitable routes, reintroduction of grounded aircraft, and a sharp increase in cargo-space utilisation.

=== 2020s ===
For the first time in its history, PIA operated a relief flight from Lahore to Melbourne, Australia, during the COVID-19 pandemic.

On 22 May 2020, a PIA Airbus A320-214, registered as AP-BLD, crashed near Karachi airport with 99 people on board. The flight was en route to Karachi from Lahore. Flight PK8303, carrying 91 passengers and eight crew members on board, crashed while on the descent towards the runway of Jinnah International Airport, killing 97 while two passengers survived. The crash was caused by damage to the aircraft in the first belly landing, with both engines flaming out during the go-around. The final report listed the primary reasons as human error, non-adherence to SOPs and disregard of ATC instructions during the event flight, and lack of communication between the ATC and the flight crew.

The International Air Transport Association (IATA) expressed concerns over the "serious lapse in licensing and safety oversight by the aviation regulator".

In November 2020, PIA shut down its courier arm, SpeedEx, whose infrastructure was scattered over 74 domestic destinations, and laid off its 320 employees.

In December 2020, PIA announced a plan to lay off half of its employees and transferred its engineering arm, Precision Engineering Complex (PEC), to the Pakistan Air Force.

On 24 June 2020, in the wake of Flight 8303 crash, Pakistani Aviation Minister Ghulam Sarwar Khan told Parliament that 262 of Pakistan's 860 active, licensed pilots had been found to have suspicious or fake licenses. They were suspected of having paid someone else to take their certification examination on their behalf. PIA subsequently grounded 150 of its 434 pilots on suspicion of having a bogus license. Later, the employment of seven pilots was terminated.

Almost a week after the comments by Pakistan's Aviation Minister, the European Union Aviation Safety Agency (EASA) suspended PIA's authorization, banning PIA from flying in European airspace for six months from the following day, following multiple safety failings.

Following the EU's decision to ban PIA, the United States banned the airline over concerns about its certification of pilots on 9 July 2020. By that date, PIA was also banned from flights in the United Kingdom, and Pakistani pilots in Vietnam and Malaysia were grounded on a temporary basis. I addition, on 15 July 2020, the US Federal Aviation Administration downgraded Pakistan's International Aviation Safety Assessment rating to Category 2, preventing Pakistani airlines including PIA from establishing new services in the United States or carrying the code of any US airline.

On 18 July, PIA dismissed seven pilots and one member of cabin crew whose licenses had been revoked by the country's Civil Aviation Authority (CAA).

On 28 December, the EU ban was extended for three more months, stating that an official inspection of the CAA would have to be performed first. On 16 March 2021, the ban was extended to July. Less than a month later, the ban was extended indefinitely, following another safety concern regarding the CAA that was made public by the International Civil Aviation Organization (ICAO). ICAO has yet to perform safety audit of the CAA. The European Union Aviation Safety Agency (EASA) stated that the ICAO's safety audit would be a sign of improvement.

On 6 November 2021, the first sign of improvement appeared when the CAA received positive feedback from Europe's Safety Audit for Foreign-Origin Aircraft (SAFA).

In late 2023, PIA was forced to cancel numerous flights due to unpaid fuel bills. Resulting cancelations resulted in multiple instances of customer anger creating viral social media content. State-owned Pakistan State Oil suspended fueling of PIA aircraft after PIA's request for additional government funding was denied.

Further improvements were made on 8 March 2023, when PIA completed an online safety audit conducted by EASA.

On 29 November 2024, EASA lifted its ban on PIA, citing improvements in the CAA's oversight. PIA subsequently announced the resumption of flights to Europe, beginning with a flight to Paris that took off on 10 January 2025.

In late December 2023, the Interim government announced a plan to privatise the airline. During a question hour in the Senate, the adviser to Prime Minister on Aviation Air Marshal (Retd) Farhat Hussain Khan that said privatisation of Pakistan International Airlines is being carried out under the government's policy to privatise loss making entities. The Adviser said that initially PIA will be privatised as a flight entity and the decision on its other properties will be decided later.

On 6 January 2025, it was reported that PIA would expand its number of destinations to the Middle East by deploying its fleet of Boeing 777 and Airbus A320 aircraft. From 20 January 2025 onward, PIA started offering two weekly flights between Sialkot and Bahrain. Another two weekly flights are operated between Lahore and Dammam beginning 22 January 2025 while a once-a-week flight commenced on 25 January 2025 between Lahore and Kuwait. Besides, PIA will also introduce weekly flights from Faisalabad to Jeddah starting 20 January 2025 and another weekly service between Sialkot and Doha, Qatar from 21 January 2025.

On 16 July 2025, the UK's Civil Aviation Authority lifted its ban on PIA, also citing safety improvements. PIA announced its intention to resume flights to the UK starting with three weekly flights between Islamabad and Manchester, later reducing the frequency to two weekly. Although the inaugural flight was continuously delayed due to delays in obtaining a Third Country Operator certificate, the airline finally got it on 24 September and subsequently launched flights in October 2025.

On 23 December 2025, a consortium of companies led by the Arif Habib Corporation was awarded a 75% majority stake at PIA after submitting a bid of 135 billion rupees ($482 million) at auction. Following the privatization, Fauji Fertilizer also joined the Arif Habib-led consortium.

In February 2026, the Arif Habib Group announced its plan to buy the remaining 25% of PIA. The consortium intends to complete the deal after expected regulatory approval in April, according to group CEO Shahid Ali Habib. Following official clearance, the remaining shares should be paid for within a year. This comes after the consortium paid close to Rs135 billion in December to acquire a 75 percent stake. The deadline for acquiring the remaining 25% interest is the end of April, and its estimated value is Rs45 billion.

== Corporate management ==
=== Structure ===
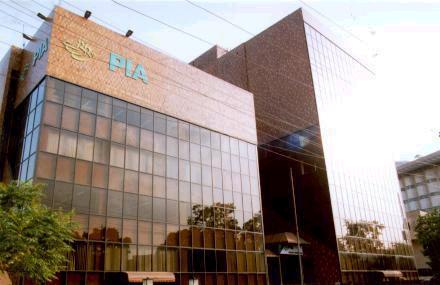
Office located in Lahore

Pakistan International Airlines Corporation Limited (PIACL) is majority-owned by the Arif Habib Corporation (75%) while the remainder (25%) is owned by the Government of Pakistan. The airline is under the administration of Aviation Division and is managed by a president and chief executive officer as well as the board of directors.

The board consists of nine independent non-executive members and has four sub-committees: an Audit Committee, Brand and Advertising Committee, Finance Committee, and Human Resource Committee, each having its charter and chairman. The president and chief executive officer leads the executive management of staff who run the airline. The airline's main headquarters are located at Karachi, while smaller subhead offices are located in several cities within Pakistan.

Seven of PIA's ten departments are in Islamabad, viz, Marketing Department, Procedure Bureau, Central Reservation Control, Revenue Management, HR and Security and Vigilance Department. The remaining three departments are in Karachi, namely finance, engineering and situation room.

In October 2026, Adrian Hamilton-Manns, former chief executive officer of SalamAir, appointed as new chief executive officer.

=== Privatization ===
In the late 1990s, the Government of Pakistan announced privatization plans due to the persistent losses suffered by the airline, but they were never implemented; however, several steps towards the outsourcing of non-core businesses were initiated. Catering units (starting with Karachi Flight Kitchen), ground handling (starting with ramp services) and engineering, are to gradually leave the airline and operate as independent companies. In 1997, Pakistan called in a team from International Finance (IFC), the consulting arm of the World Bank, to advise on restructuring and privatization of Pakistan International Airlines (PIA). However, no agreement was reached. Despite the government's multiple privatization plans, on 18 February 2009, the carrier was dropped from the privatization list.

In 2013, the Government of Pakistan once again aimed to privatize the airline due to increased losses by selling twenty-six percent of shares and management control to the investor. This plan was dropped due to protests by airline unions and associations after security forces killed two employees approaching the Jinnah International Airport terminal building.

In 2018, the newly elected government aimed to not privatize the entity and instead achieve profitability through the change in its top management.

On 6 February 2024, the Caretaker Cabinet of the interim Government decided to split different functions of Pakistan International Airlines into two entities to make it attractive for investors. These entities were named TopCo and HoldCo. TopCo was allocated basic functions, including engineering, ground handling, and flight kitchen and training. HoldCo was given Precision Engineering Complex, PIA Investment Limited and subordinate departments and properties.

On 4 June 2024, the government pre qualified 6 companies to bid for the privatization of Pakistan International Airlines. these companies were Air Blue, Arif Habib Corporation, Blue World City, Fly Jinnah, Pak Ethanol (Pvt) Consortiums, and YB Holdings Consortiums.

On 30 October 2024, the final bidding process for PIA's privatization attracted only one bid from Blue World City, a real estate development company. The bid offered 10 billion Pakistani rupees (approximately $36 million) for a 60% stake in the airline, which was substantially below the government's minimum price of 85 billion Pakistani rupees.

On 13 November 2024, the Pakistani government officially rejected the bid, emphasizing that the privatization process would adhere to laws and regulations, with final decisions made in the national interest by the cabinet committee.

On 9 July 2025, the Government of Pakistan approved four potential investors to take over Pakistan International Airlines (PIA). These companies are Air Blue, Fauji Fertilizers, Lucky Cement Consortium (Includes Hub Power, Kohat Cement, and Metro Ventures) and Arif Habib Consortium (Fatima Fertilizer, City Schools and Lake City Holdings).

In December 2025, it was announced that the Government of Pakistan had sold its 75% stake in PIA to the private investor consortium led by Arif Habib. The transaction, valued at 135 billion Pakistani rupees (equivalent to US$480 million), formed part of a long-delayed privatisation programme linked to broader economic reforms.

=== Financial and operational performance ===
In 2011, PIA began to be unprofitable, requiring government subsidies. By the end of 2016, the airline was saddled with $3 billion in debt. At the end of 2018, the airline was burdened with $3.3 billion in debt, up from $2.97 billion the year before, and thus requiring government bailouts for continued operation. In April 2019, PIA claimed that its revenues almost matched operating costs. An audit in September 2019 revealed that PIA had operated 46 empty flights between 2016 and 2017, without any passengers causing a loss of $1.1 million to the airline. Additionally, 36 Hajj flights were flown without any passengers. By the end of 2019, PIA reported a 41% increase in year-on-year revenue due to discontinuation of unprofitable routes, reintroduction of idle aircraft, and a sharp increase in the airline cargo space utilisation.

The airline faces many challenges to its profitability. PIA, along with Etihad, were once considered one of the cheapest airlines in the GCC. Pakistan faces what has been termed "capacity dumping" by Middle East airlines, who operate numerous daily flights to every major city in Pakistan. Pakistan's Open Skies Agreement with the UAE, for example, allows Emirati airlines an unlimited number of seats into Karachi, with Emirates airline alone operating up to seven daily flights to Karachi from Dubai on high-capacity Boeing 777s. PIA also discontinued previously profitable routes to the US, as the TSA forbade nonstop flights from Pakistan to the US, and instead required costly diversions to European airports for immigration clearance – resulting in flight times that were significantly longer than flights on Middle Eastern airlines. New routes such as to Najaf and Bangkok also did not improve the airline's finances given the seasonality of those destinations. Further, staffing levels and overall management issues, including an employee count of 18,014 in 2010 for a fleet of 40 aircraft, present further challenges, although in August 2019, PIA laid off 1,000 "redundant employees".

Financial and operational performance
Year	Revenue (PKR million)	Net income (PKR million)	Passenger load factor (%)	Revenue passengers (million)	Employees (average)
2005	▲64,074	▼(4,411)	▲69	▲5.499	▼19,263
2006	▲70,587	▼(12,763)	▼68	▲5.732	▼18,282
2007	▼70,480	▼(13,398)	▼67	▼5.415	▼18,149
2008	▲89,201	▼(35,880)	▲71	▲5.617	▼18,036
2009	▲94,563	▲(5,822)	▲70	▼5.535	▼17,944
2010	▲107,531	▼(20,785)	▲74	▲5.538	▲18,019
2011	▲116,550	▼(26,767)	▼72	▲5.953	▼18,014
2012	▼112,130	▼(33,181)	▼70	▼5.236	▼17,439
2013	▼95,771	▼(44,524)	70	▼4.449	▼16,604
2014	▲99,519	▲(31,744)	▲72	▼4.202	▼16,243
2015	▼91,268	▼(32,529)	▼70	▲4.394	▲16,271
2016	▼88,997	▼(44,900)	▲71.6	▲5.486	▼13,947
2017	▲90,843	▼(47,760)	▲73.2	▼5.342	▼13,592
2018	▲103,490	▼(67,327)	▲77.3	▼5.203	▼12,437
2019	▲147,500	▲(55,451)	▲81.3	▲5.290	▼11,740
2020	▼94,989	▲(34,642)	▼74.5	▼2.541	▼10,779
2021	▼86,185	▼(50,101)	▼66.9	▲2.657	▼8,558
2022	▲172,038	▼(88,008)	▲80.28	▲4.281	▼8,031
2023	▲237,882	▼(104,500)	▲83.30	▲4.496	▼7,755
2024	▼204,164	▲26,203	▼81.8	▼3.904	▼6,625

== Destinations ==
As of November 2019, PIA serves 19 domestic and 28 international destinations in 20 countries across Asia, the Middle East, Europe and North America.

PIA with its Interline agreements and codeshare partner airlines, offers a wider choice of travel in 102 international destinations in 40 countries across the world with different flight connections.

=== Hubs ===
PIA’s hubs are Jinnah International Airport, Allama Iqbal International Airport and Islamabad International Airport. Karachi is PIA’s main hub, while Islamabad and Lahore serve as secondary hubs.

=== Codeshare agreements ===
PIA has codeshare agreements with the following airlines:

- China Southern Airlines
- Etihad Airways
- Kenya Airways
- Thai Airways International
- Turkish Airlines

=== Interline agreements ===
PIA has interline agreements with the following airlines:

- Air China
- Air France
- China Southern Airlines
- Emirates
- Ethiopian Airlines
- Etihad Airways
- Flydubai
- KLM
- Malaysia Airlines
- Qatar Airways
- Rwandair
- Saudia
- Singapore Airlines
- SriLankan Airlines
- Thai Airways International
- Virgin Australia
- WestJet

=== Cargo SPA agreements ===
PIA has cargo special pro-rate agreements with the following airlines:

- Air Canada
- Air China
- Garuda Indonesia
- Kenya Airways
- Malaysia Airlines
- Philippine Airlines
- Qantas
- Riyadh Air
- Saudia
- Thai Airways International
- Turkish Airlines

== Fleet ==
=== Current fleet ===
As of February 2026, Pakistan International Airlines operates the following aircraft:

Pakistan government’s condition was that the buyer have to add 38 aircraft to PIA fleet over the next four years, but according to new owner Arif Habib Consortium, PIA will have 38 aircraft in first phase & 65 aircraft in second phase over the next 4-6 years.

Aircraft	In service	Orders	Notes
ATR 42-500	3	—	
Airbus A320-200	20	—	
Boeing 777-200ER	6	—	
Boeing 777-200LR	2	—	Launch customer
Boeing 777-300ER	4	—	
Boeing 787-9	2	3	2 wet-leased from Norse Atlantic, 3 other aircraft to be dry-leased. Operations started on 31 October.
Total	37	3	

=== Former fleet ===
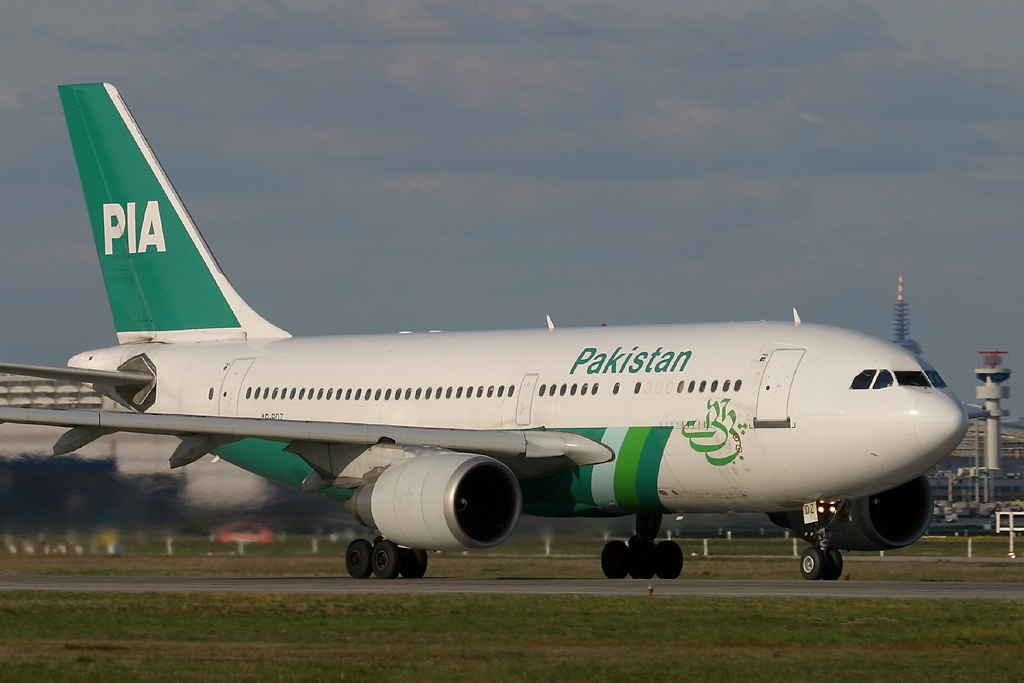
Airbus A310-300 taxiing at Frankfurt Airport in 2004

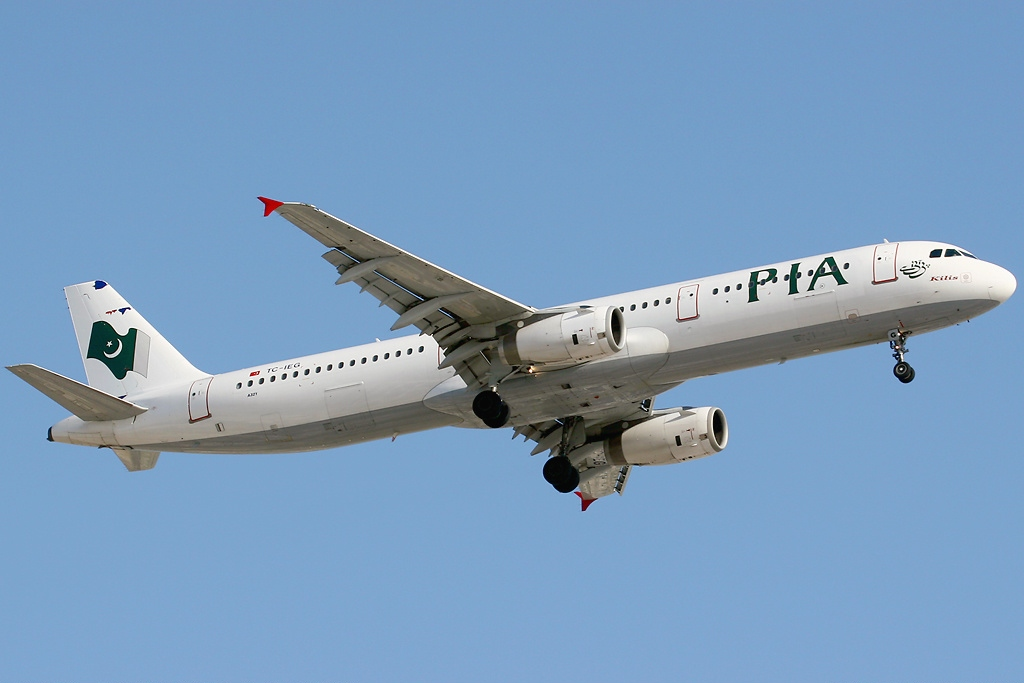
Airbus A321

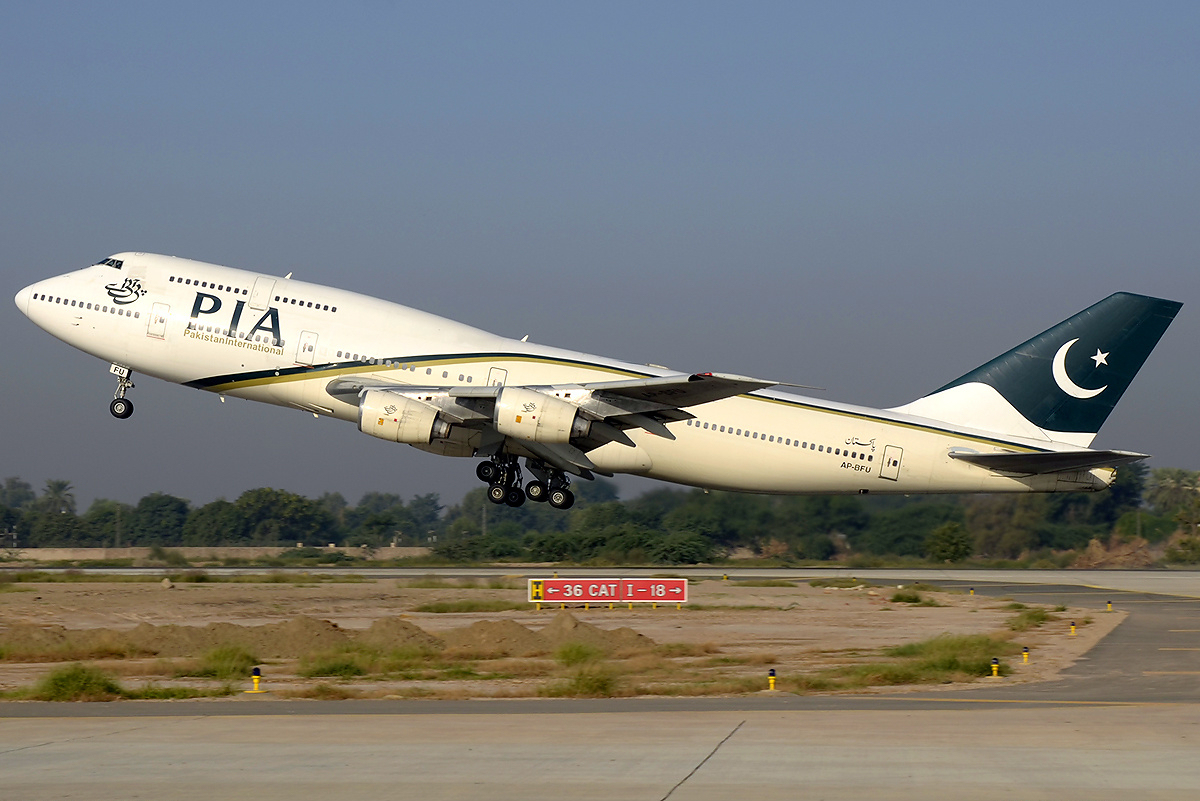
Boeing 747–300 taking off from Multan International Airport for a Hajj flight in 2010

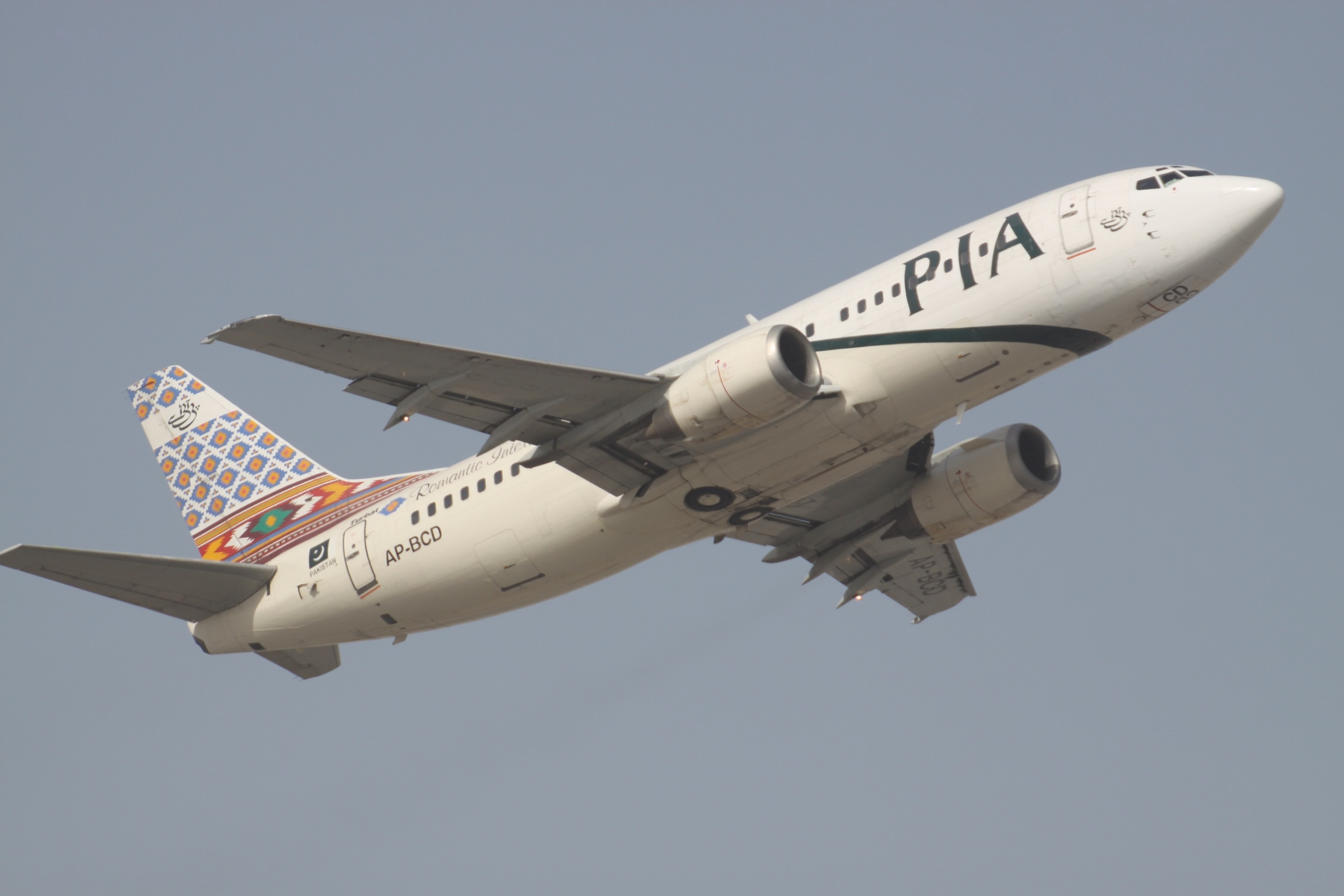
Boeing-737

Pakistan International Airlines historically operated the following aircraft

Aircraft	Total	Introduced	Retired	Notes
Airbus A300B4-200	10	1980	2005	
Airbus A300B4-200	1	1986	1992	Crashed as flight PK268
Airbus A310-300	12	1991	2016	
Airbus A320-200	1	2014	2020	Crashed as flight PK8303
Airbus A321-200	2	2006	2007	
Airbus A330-300	1	2016	2017	
Airbus A330-900	1	2020	2021	
ATR 42-500	1	2007	2016	Crashed as flight PK661
ATR 72-500	3	2015	2020	One aircraft transferred to Pakistan Naval Air Arm.
Boeing 707-320C	12	1960	1999	Six on strength per 1975 Directory
Boeing 707-320C	1	1960	1979	Crashed as flight PK740
Boeing 720B	9	1962	1986	Four listed per 1975 Flight Directory
Boeing 720B	1	1962	1965	Crashed as flight PK705
Boeing 737-300	8	1985	2014	
Boeing 737-800	4	2014	2015	Temporarily leased.
Boeing 747-200B	6	1976	2005	
Boeing 747-200B Combi	2	1979	2011	
Boeing 747-300	6	1999	2015	
Convair CV-240 family	4	1947	1959	
de Havilland Canada DHC-6 Twin Otter	8	1970	2001	
Douglas DC-3	15	1947	1967	
Douglas DC-8-21F	1	1977	1978	
Douglas DC-8-61CF	1	1977	1978	
Fokker F27-200 Friendship	22	1961	2006	Six (all F-27 variants) per 1975 Flight Directory
Fokker F27-200 Friendship	1	1961	1989	Missing as flight PK404
Fokker F27-200 Friendship	1	1961	2006	Crashed as flight PK688
Fokker F27-400 Friendship	1	1961	2003	
Fokker F27-600 Friendship	5	1966	1986	
Hiller UH-12E4	1	1963	1971	
Hawker Siddeley Trident 1E	4	1966	1970	
Lockheed L-100-382B-4C Hercules	2	1966	1966	
Lockheed L-1049C Super Constellation	3	1954	1969	
Lockheed L-1049H Super Constellation	2	1958	1969	
McDonnell Douglas DC-10-30	5	1974	1986	Three listed per 1975 Flight Directory
Mil Mi-8 MTV-1	1	1995	1997	
Sikorsky S-61N	3	1963	1967	
Sikorsky S-61N	1	1963	1966	Crashed as flight PK17
Tupolev Tu-154	4	1996	1997	
Vickers Viscount 815	5	1956	1966	

== Livery ==
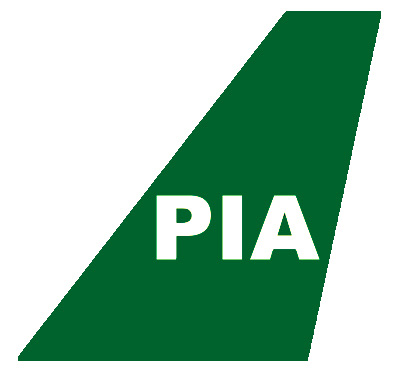
1980s legacy tail, which became an identity for the airline

In December 2003, PIA introduced a new image that was applied to its first Boeing 777-200ER and on two newly leased Airbus A310s, one of which was in service. The livery was white at the front and beige at the rear separated by a dark green stripe. The tail was painted white with a new typeface PIA acronym written in dark green. The Pakistan title was added to the front fuselage in all raised letters and the engine cowlings were painted in beige. The PIA logo written in calligraphic Urdu was added just behind the cockpit. However, due to criticism, the design was modified before the first Boeing 777 was delivered. The tail logo was replaced by a flowing Pakistan flag on a beige background. The "Pakistan" titles were removed and the PIA acronym was enlarged and moved onto the fuselage. The English and Urdu PIA titles remained the same. The leased A310s and most of the PIA fleet also adopted this livery at a later date.

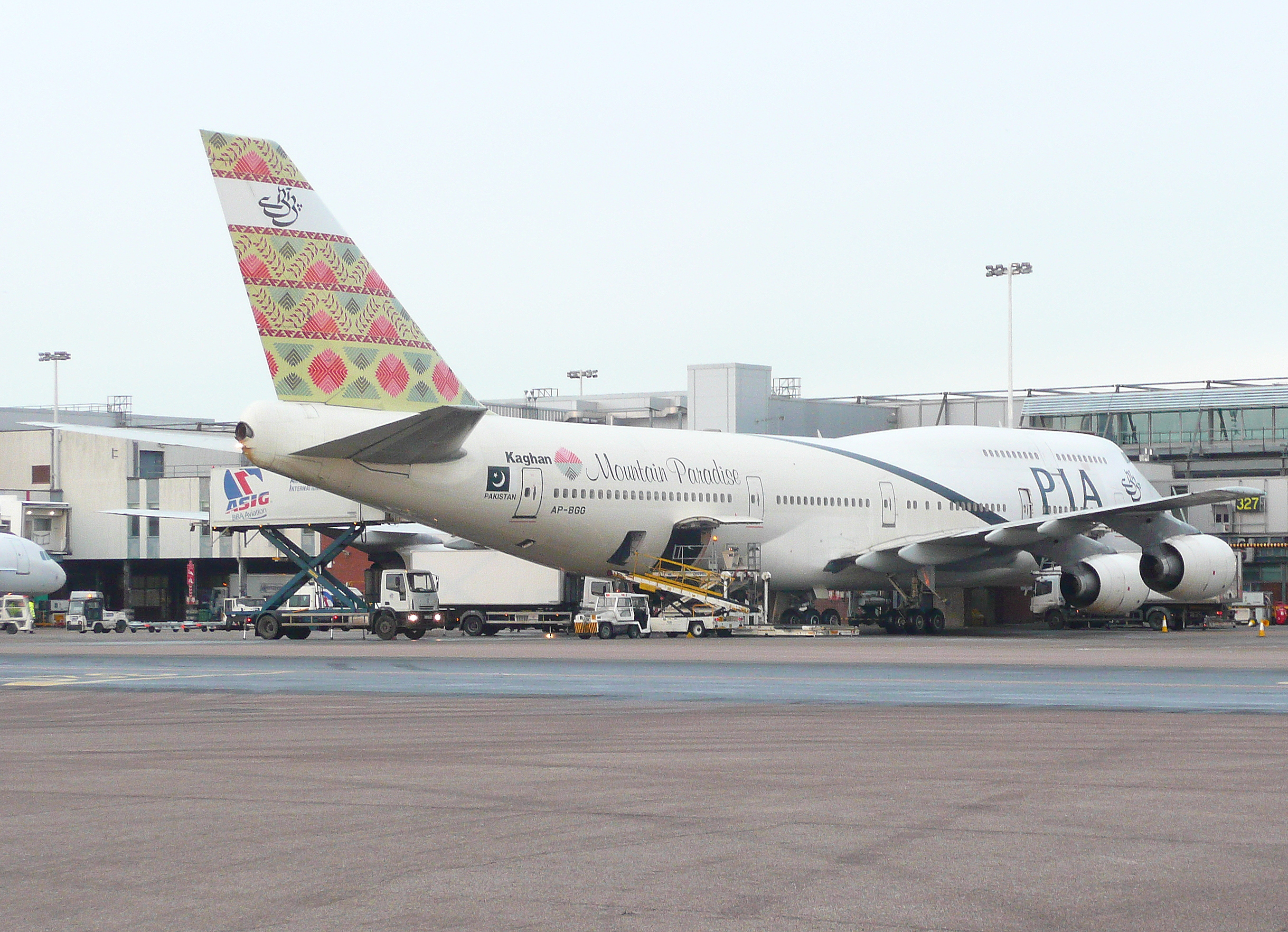
A Boeing 747–300 painted in Frontier livery

In early 2006, the airline launched four new tail designs for its fleet. The tails represented the four provinces of Pakistan: Sindh, Punjab, Khyber Pakhtunkhwa and Balochistan. The tails promoted the cultures of the four provinces of Pakistan by applying motifs to the tails and adding a city name to the rear of the fuselage corresponding to the province. The "Frontier" tail represented the "Phulkari" (flowering) pattern, which reflected a tradition of embroidery generally done on shawls, shirts, and linen. The "Punjab" tail was loosely related to the tile decoration of the Wazir Khan Mosque in Lahore. The "Balochistan" tail showed the creativity seen in the local kilims, carpets, and rugs woven with wool, goat or camel hair and mixed yarn. The pattern was mostly bold geometric motifs in primary colours dominated by red. The "Sindh" tail was influenced by the Hala tile work with electric blue and white floral patterns. In 2009, management stopped the application of provincial tails, deeming them too costly.

PIA launched its new livery in mid April 2010. An Airbus A310, Boeing 777–200 and Boeing 747–300 were the first aircraft to wear the new look. The livery was unveiled at the PIA headquarters on a Boeing 777 model. The livery consisted of a green and gold strip running around the bottom of the fuselage and continuing right up until the tail cone. The forward/upper portion was white and at the rear, it was an off-white/beige colour. The bottom part of the tail blended into the upper fuselage as it too is white, with the rest of the tail painted with a large wavy Pakistan flag, which takes up the whole tail, in a dark green colour. At the front of the fuselage, 'PIA' was written in a billboard style in dark green and underneath 'Pakistan' was written in golden colour. Just behind the cockpit, there is a stylised Urdu PIA logo as well as on the engines.

In July 2014, on the delivery of the first A320 series aircraft, PIA introduced a "crescent and star" on the aircraft engines' cowlings in place of the Urdu PIA logo. In 2015, after the completion of sixty years service, the 1960s livery was applied to three of the Airbus A320s and on one Boeing 777-200ER.

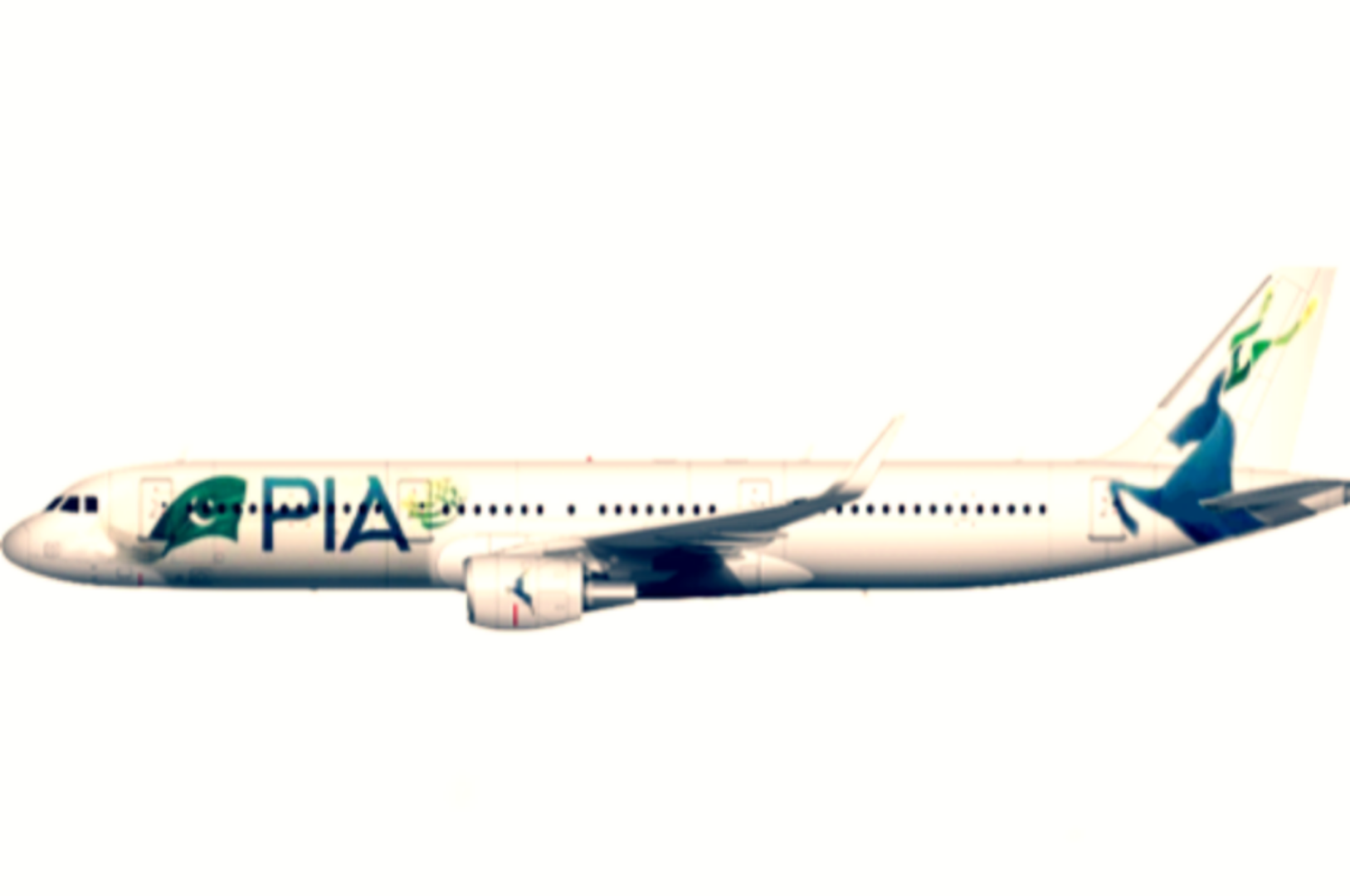
In 2018, Pakistan's national animal Markhor (screw-horned goat) was chosen to be the brand on aircraft tails. However later the Supreme Court of Pakistan took suo motu action and barred PIA from using the Markhor as brand; consequentially only one Airbus A320 was painted in such livery.

Logo with Kashmiri Markhor, used in 2018

In April 2018, PIA formally launched a new brand identity and livery and added a portrait of the Markhor in a ceremony held at PIA Offices in Islamabad, presented by the then head of brand of PIA, having Pakistan's national animal represented on its aircraft, including a large one on the tail and two on the engines, describing the resilient nature of PIA Brand surviving under the onslaught of all the negativity associated with the brand.

The symbol of animal was chosen for its universal recognition as the Urdu calligraphy logo of PIA could not be comprehended by non-Pakistani customers. In essence the idea was to make PIA a truly international brand based on the values of resilience, grace and fortitude, something which PIA had lost with increased focus on ethnic traffic. The tail had a forward leaping Markhor having long screw horns, which are the features of 'Kashmiri Markhor' endemic to Pakistan only. According to the initial plan, a euro-white style was chosen and existing green and golden strips were removed from the aircraft fuselage along with off-white/beige colour on the rear fuselage, but later a major rebranding was carried out. The font of the PIA logo was also changed and added to the fuselage. For the first time, legacy PIA colours (Pakistan green and mustard gold) were dropped and a blue texture was added in the "PIA" acronym expanding the colour palette for the brand. Urdu PIA logo colour was also changed from the yellow-green gradient texture. The airline's slogan was also changed to "We Fly at the Right Attitude" from "Great People to Fly With". The first aircraft with the redesigned livery was converted on 12 May 2018 and rolled out of Isphani Hangar by the method of decals to make a debut at the New Islamabad International Airport. The re-branding was halted on Suo Moto Notice taken by Supreme Court of Pakistan on fears of spending millions on the rebranding and not paying the salary of the staff on time. The Supreme Court of Pakistan suo motu notice barred PIA from using the Markhor logo as its brand identity. The Supreme Court later gave orders to retain the flag on the tail and disposed of the case. However, with a management change, the re-branding was abandoned altogether.

== Services ==
=== Catering ===
PIA Catering is the main supplier of meals for the airline at Islamabad and Karachi. It can produce 15,000 passenger meals each day. In 2006, the management of the flight kitchens was given to Singapore Air Terminal Services (SATS). This agreement ended in 2011 and PIA is managing the Flight Kitchens in Karachi and Islamabad itself. As of April 2019, an MOU was signed between PIA and McDonald's for the airlines catering. PIA Catering provides special meals to allow for passengers' dietary and religious needs. No alcoholic beverages or pork are served on board due to Islamic dietary laws.

=== PIA Premier service ===
PIA Premier was launched as a luxury air service on 14 August 2016. An Airbus A330 aircraft was initially wet-leased from SriLankan Airlines to operate the service. There were six weekly flights to London, three each from Islamabad and Lahore. However, it was soon diminished due to a loss of 2.1 billion rupees.

=== In-flight entertainment ===
Pakistan International Airlines was the first international airline to introduce entertainment system showing a regularly scheduled film on board in the year 1962.

=== In-flight internet ===
In January 2017, the airline began trials on an on-board internet system to deliver in-flight entertainment on some domestic flights. The system allows passengers to access a selection of in-flight entertainment content using their own mobile devices. PIA offers personal screens on Boeing 777 flights with in-flight movies, music and TV shows. The Boeing 777 IFE also features an inflight map and air show. Selected A320s feature drop-down screens with in-flight map and air-show.

=== Precision Engineering Complex ===
The Precision Engineering Complex (PEC) is a specialized manufacturing and engineering facility that was a subsidiary of the Pakistan International Airlines Holding Company Limited (PIAHCL) before being transferred to an entity owned by the Pakistan Air Force. Established originally as a unit of Pakistan International Airlines (PIA), the PEC is an integrated complex that focuses on producing high-precision components for the aerospace and broader engineering industries. Its capabilities encompass various disciplines, including investment casting, Conventional and CNC (Computer Numerical Control) machining, optics, PCB (Printed Circuit Board) manufacturing, electrical, electronics, and composites. As a key player in the country's engineering sector, the facility has secured international certifications and operates as a supplier to global aerospace giants such as General Electric, Airbus Industries, and Boeing. The transfer of ownership from PIAHCL to Precision Engineering Complex (Private) Limited, a designated company of the Pakistan Air Force, was approved by PIAHCL shareholders in late 2025 as part of the broader government-led restructuring and privatization effort concerning the national flag carrier.

The Precision Engineering Complex (PEC) includes the following facilities:

- Binocular Assembly
- Calibration Facility
- Glass Fibre Composite Manufacturing
- Investment Casting Facility
- Machine Shop
- Material Testing Laboratory
- Non Destructive Testing Facility
- Optics
- Printed Circuit Boards (PCB)
- Plating Facilities
- Packaging Plant
- Shot Peening

=== Ground handling ===
PIA provides ground handling services to the following airlines:

- Azerbaijan Airlines
- Air China
- China Southern Airlines
- Gulf Air
- Oman Air
- Qatar Airways
- Saudia
- SriLankan Airlines
- Turkish Airlines
- Uzbekistan Airways

== PIA Cargo ==
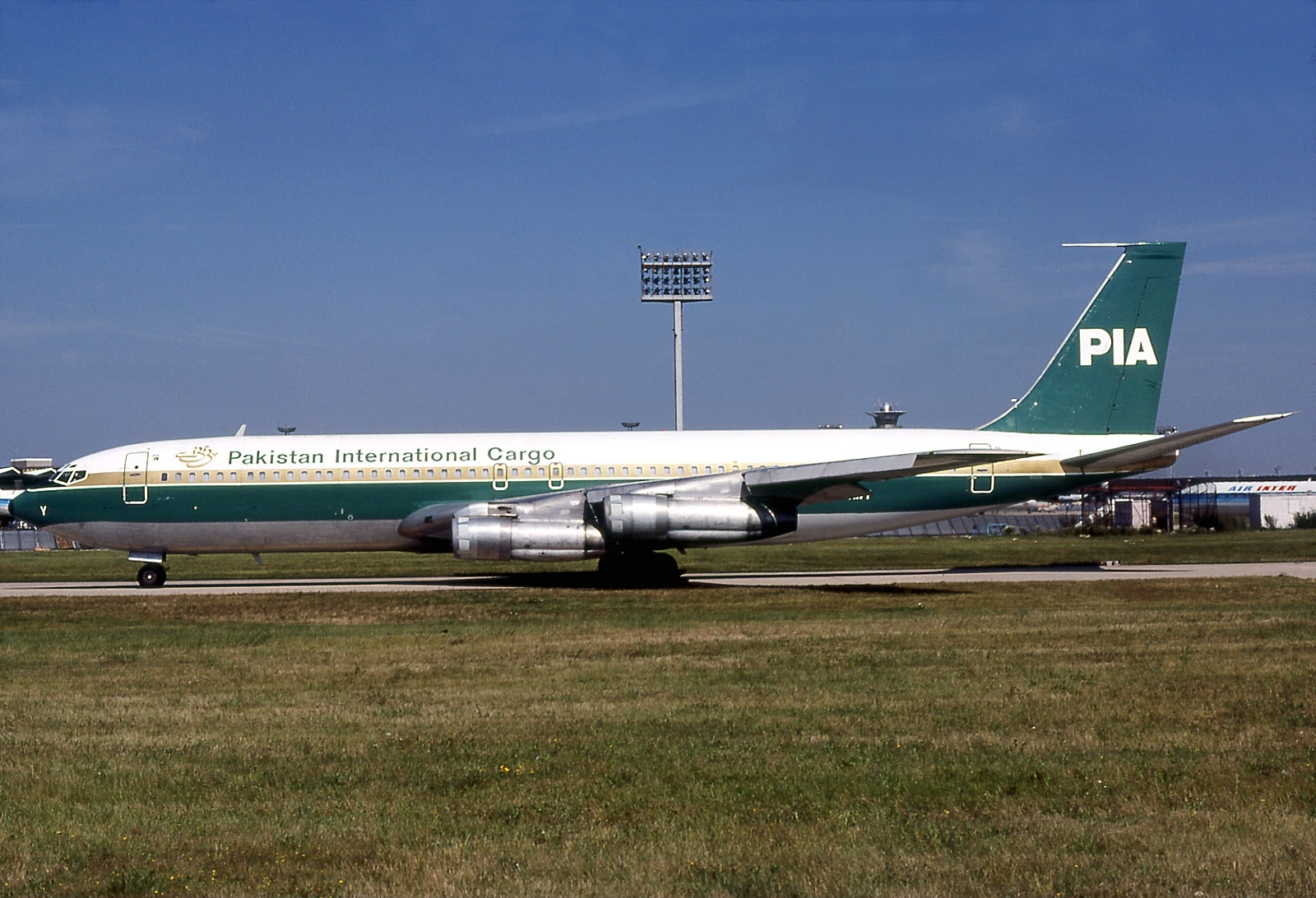
A Boeing 707C cargo aircraft taxiing at Paris Charles de Gaulle Airport in 1978.

The PIA Cargo is a cargo airline branch that provides logistics services and delivery system within Pakistan and abroad. The PIA Cargo transports goods across Pakistan as well as to international destinations. These consumer goods include meat packing, vegetables, textiles, paper products, laboratory equipment, and postal mail.

During the early 1970s, PIA operated a service called Air Express that delivered documents and parcels within Pakistan. In 1974, PIA launched a dedicated cargo division within its organisation using two Boeing 707-320C. This division was known as Pakistan International Cargo. The airline operated several cargo flights to the Middle East such as Dubai and Europe, especially London. The operations ended in the late 1990s when both aircraft were phased out. During 2004 to 2007, the airline again operated two Airbus A300 Freighter aircraft chartered through MNG Airlines to Haan. Luton, Amsterdam, Basel and Cologne. However, again the contract ended and PIA discontinued this service.

In 2003, the airline launched PIA Speedex, a courier service initially in Karachi, Lahore, Rawalpindi and Islamabad. This expanded to twelve cities within a year. Today, the airline serves over 70 locations within Pakistan, with shipments collected and delivered from customers homes.

In 2019, the new PIA management experienced a sharp increase in the airline's cargo space utilisation, from 20 percent to almost 80 percent.

PIA currently offers cargo service for these international destinations: Abu Dhabi, Bangkok, Barcelona, Birmingham, China – Beijing, Copenhagen, Doha, Dubai, Jeddah, Kabul, Kuala Lumpur, London, Manchester, Medina, Milan, Muscat, Najaf, Oslo, Paris, Riyadh, Sharjah, Tokyo – Narita and Toronto – Canada.

== Corporate sponsorship ==
The airline has sponsored events, both within Pakistan and in its overseas markets.

In the 1990s, the airline launched the three green stripe livery to represent its support for sports. The airline supports the Pakistan International Airlines first-class cricket team that plays in the Quaid-i-Azam Trophy and Patron's Trophy. PIA sponsors the PIA football club, and the A1 Team Pakistan in the A1 Grand Prix motorsports championship series of open-wheel auto racing series when it was initially launched. The airline also promotes the Shandur Polo Gala, that takes place every year in the Chitral and Gilgit regions of northern Pakistan during the summer period. PIA has had its own sports division since 1958, promoting sports within Pakistan such as cricket, hockey, football, squash, polo, tennis, bridge, chess, table tennis, cycling, and bodybuilding.

PIA has its own Boy Scouts Association (PIA-BSA), working in partnership with Pakistan Boy Scouts Association. After a devastating earthquake in 2005, PIA-BSA worked in partnership with other charity organisations to provide relief help.

PIA was one of the official sponsors of the "Destination Pakistan 2007" festivals. The official logo was added to a select number of aircraft during the year. In 2008, PIA teamed up with mobile phone provider, Ufone to provide air miles to passengers who used the mobile network. Standard Chartered Bank and PIA launched credit cards allowing passengers to earn air miles. In 2009, PIA was the gold sponsor for Logistics Pakistan, an exhibition and conference poised to highlight the emerging opportunities for the Logistics sector in Pakistan. In 2009, PIA and the Pakistan Remittance Initiative (PRI) formed a strategic alliance to promote world money transfers.

PIA has Planetariums in Karachi and Lahore that enable the public to see static aircraft as well as astronomy shows. PIA Horticulture, set up in 1996, provides flowers for display in PIA's offices and events, winning awards and accolades at flower exhibitions across the country. The airline supports non-profit organisations within Pakistan such as Al-Shifa Trust, Zindagi Trust, The Citizens Foundation, and Sindh Institute of Urology and Transplantation. In 2009, PIA teamed up with the fast-food franchise McDonald's, to offer passengers discounts on meals and upgrades. PIA also owns three hotels, the Roosevelt Hotel, the Scribe Hotel and Skyrooms (Private) Limited. The airline also has an agreement with Pearl Continental Hotels for its UAE based passengers.

== Charter and special services ==
=== State officials transportation ===
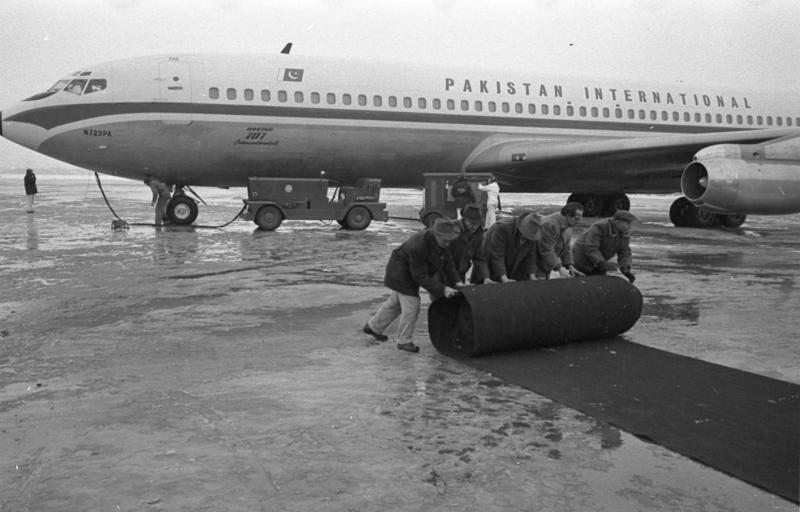
Boeing 707 - callsign "PAKISTAN 001" - carried President Ayub Khan; at Munich Riem Airport circa 1961.

PIA has been continuously serving government officials of Pakistan and has always transported the President and Prime Minister on overseas visits. During the late 1990s, a PIA Boeing 737–300 was used for official visits by the Bhutto and Sharif governments. The aircraft wore official government colours but was later repainted in the airline official colours at the end of the decade. When the government changed after a military coup in 1999, the Boeing 737–300 was transferred to PIA permanently. The President and Prime Minister then resorted to using two of PIA's Airbus A310-300s for official visits, while rare trips were done on regular commercial flights of the airline. In February 2007 the government of Qatar gifted an Airbus A310 from its VIP fleet to the Pakistani government; this ended the need for the use of PIA aircraft. However, from time to time the government uses one of the airline's Airbus A320s, or occasionally a Boeing 777, for official trips.

=== Charter services ===
PIA operates private charter flights using ATR 42s to Bhit, Kadanwari and Sehwan Sharif in Sindh as well as to other parts of the country for oil and gas companies and other customers. Ad hoc charters for United Nations peacekeeping troops are also carried out to Africa and Eastern Europe, Asia (South Korea, Afghanistan, Tajikistan, East Timor) and many other international destinations; PIA Charter Team provides these services.

=== Hajj and Umrah operations ===
PIA operates a two-month (pre- and post-) Hajj operation each year to and from Saudi Arabia. PIA transported over 100,000 intending pilgrims each year to the Kingdom of Saudi Arabia until its fleet shrank to 25 aircraft in 2011–2012. Since then, the airline's Hajj quota was reduced to 60,000 to 70,000 pilgrims by the then government.

== Awards and recognition ==
On 27 September 2024, PIA received Pakistan's first National Tourism Award for Promoting Travel and Tourism. The award was given to PIA in recognition of its outstanding work promoting domestic travel. At Pakistan's First National Tourism Awards, organised by Discover Pakistan, Air Vice Marshal Amir Hayat, CEO of PIA, received the award.

== Accidents and incidents ==
The airline has lost more than 30 aircraft in crashes and other events, including 20 fatal crashes. There have also been at least eight hijacking incidents involving the airline's aircraft between 1971 and 2017.

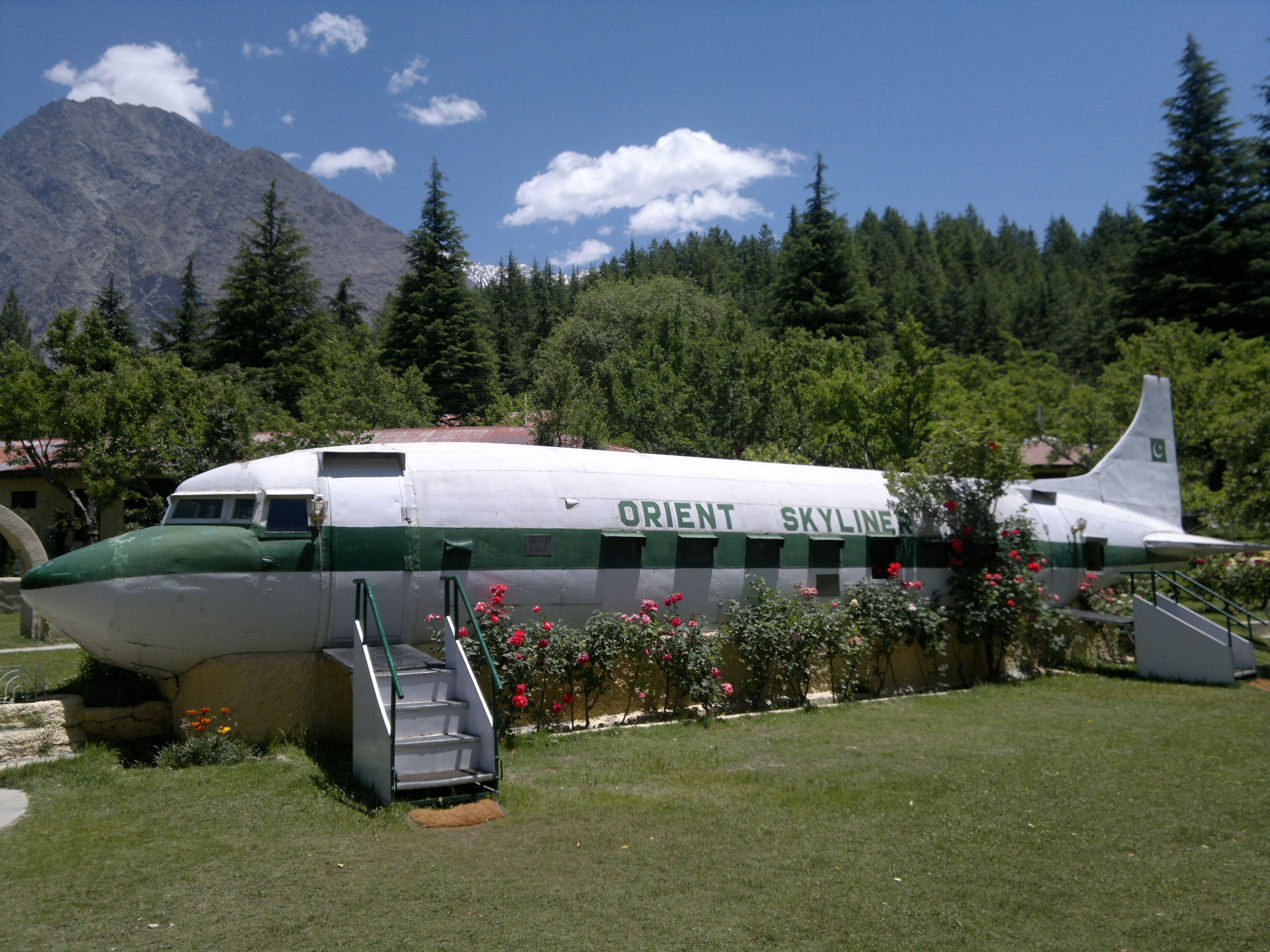
Remains of Orient Airways Skyliner C-47A (DC-3) AP-AAF, now a coffee shop near Skardu. Similar aircraft registered AP-AAD and AP-AAZ were both involved in fatal accidents.

- On 22 October 1952, an Orient Airways Douglas C-47A, with aircraft registration AP-AAZ, carrying cargo from Karachi to Dacca crashed, killing one of the crew.
- On 3 August 1953, an Orient Airways Douglas C-47A registered AP-AAD was carrying Hajj pilgrims to Mecca, with intermediate stops. Shortly after take-off on the leg from Sharjah International Airport, the First Officer lost control, and as a result, the aircraft crash-landed heavily off-airport, killing one person.
- Pakistan International Airlines experienced its first recorded hull loss in 1956: a Douglas DC-3 flew into a mountain on 25 February while on a cargo flight from Gilgit to Rawalpindi in poor weather, killing the three crew members on board.
- On 1 July 1957, a Douglas DC-3 registered AP-AJS, operating a domestic flight from Chittagong to Dhaka in East Pakistan (now Bangladesh), crashed on a mudflat in the Bay of Bengal, killing all 20 passengers and four crew members on board.
- On 15 May 1958, a Convair CV-240 with the registration AP-AEH, operating as Flight 205 from Delhi to Karachi, crashed and caught fire moments after it took off from Delhi's Palam Airport on a moonless night in dusty conditions. The investigation attributed the crash to the captain experiencing a night somatogravic illusion, resulting in the aircraft descending shortly after it became airborne. Four of the six crew members and 21 of the 38 passengers on board were killed; two people on the ground were also killed.
- On 18 May 1959, a four-month-old Vickers Viscount with the registration AP-AJC was damaged beyond economic repair in a landing accident at Rawalpindi. The aircraft ran off the runway into a rainwater channel; there were no fatalities.
- Three months after the first Viscount crash, the airline lost another on 14 August 1959. The Viscount (registered AP-AJE) crashed at Karachi International Airport during a pilot training flight, while attempting an overshoot with two engines inoperative. Two of the three people on board were killed.
- On 26 March 1965, a Douglas DC-3 registered AP-AAH crashed in mountainous terrain near the Lowari Pass on a domestic flight from Peshawar to Chitral, killing the four crew members and 18 of the 22 passengers on board.

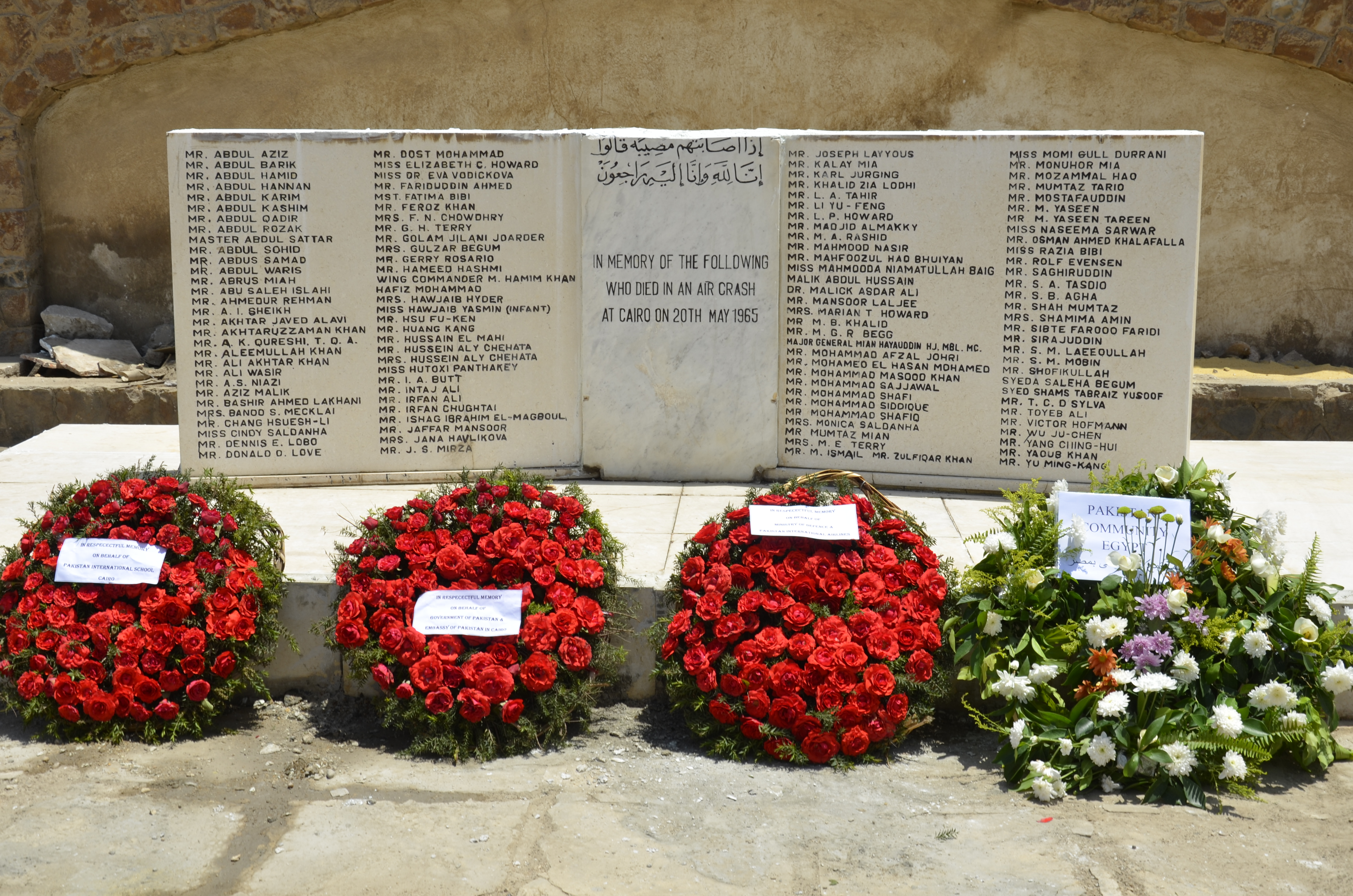
The memorial marble stone dedicated to those who died in Flight 705 crash on 20 May 1965 at Cairo airport (Egypt)

- Eight weeks later, on 20 May 1965, a Boeing 720 operating as Flight 705 crashed while descending to land on Runway 34 at Cairo International Airport, resulting in 121 fatalities.
- On 8 October 1965, a Fokker F27 Friendship, with less than 500 hours' flying time since it was delivered new to the airline earlier in the year, crashed while on a domestic cargo flight from Rawalpindi to Skardu. The aircraft (registered AP-ATT) hit a ridge near the village of Patian and slid down its side, the remains coming to rest more than 1,000 feet (300 m) below the impact point. The four crew members on board were killed.
- On 2 February 1966, Flight 17, operated by a Sikorsky S-61 helicopter, crashed on a scheduled domestic flight in East Pakistan after the main gearbox failed, killing 23 of the 24 passengers and crew on board.
- On 6 August 1970, a Fokker F27 Friendship registered AP-ALM, operating a domestic flight from Rawalpindi to Lahore, crashed at high speed a few minutes after taking off from Rawalpindi in stormy weather. All 26 passengers and four crew members on board were killed.
- On 3 December 1971, a French national's attempt to hijack a Boeing 720B flight from Paris to Karachi was thwarted by French security forces.
- On 12 December 1971, a Fokker F27 Friendship registered AP-ALX, operating an international flight between Karachi and Zahedan crashed in Pakistan near the Iranian border, killing all 4 people on board.
- On 8 December 1972, a Fokker F27 Friendship registered AP-AUS, operating a domestic flight between Gilgit and Rawalpindi in rainy weather as Flight 631, crashed in mountainous terrain. There were no survivors among the 22 passengers and four crew members on board.
- On 20 January 1978, a PIA Fokker F27 registered AP-ALW at Karachi with 22 passengers on board was hijacked by a gunman who asked to be flown to India. The then chairman of PIA, Air Marshal (Retd) Nur Khan boarded the aircraft to negotiate with the hijacker. He received a gunshot wound while trying to disarm the hijacker but still managed to overpower him.
- On 26 November 1979 Flight 740 was a Boeing 707-320C that crashed after takeoff from Jeddah International Airport for a flight to Karachi, resulting in 156 fatalities.
- On 2 March 1981, Flight 326 was hijacked by three gunmen and flown to Kabul. For almost two weeks, more than 100 passengers were held captive on the Boeing 720 until Pakistan released 55 prisoners. One passenger, Pakistani diplomat Tariq Rahim, was murdered during the ordeal.
- On 4 February 1986, a Boeing 747 registered as AP-AYW made a belly landing at Islamabad Airport around 9:00 am. The aircraft was operating Flight 300 from Karachi with 247 passengers and 17 crew members on board. Everyone survived this accident caused by pilot error.
- On 23 October 1986, a Fokker F27 aircraft crashed during approach to Peshawar Airport. Of the 54 passengers and crew on board, 13 were killed in the accident.
- On 25 August 1989, a Fokker F27 operating as Flight 404 disappeared shortly after taking off from Gilgit Airport. All 54 passengers and crew on board were presumed killed.

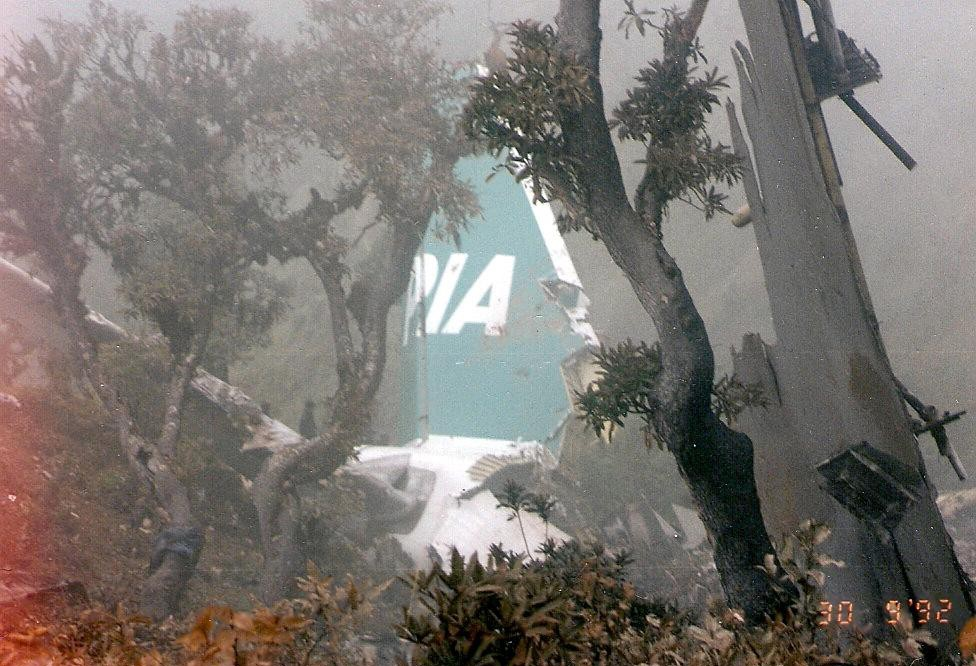
The crash site of Flight 268 at Kathmandu's Tribhuvan International Airport on 28 September 1992

- On 28 September 1992 Flight 268, an Airbus A300 B4-200 registration AP-BCP, crashed on approach to Kathmandu's Tribhuvan International Airport. All 167 on board were killed.
- On 27 December 1997, a Pakistan Airlines Boeing 747 plane from Karachi to London, crashed when landing at Dubai international airport. It overshot the runway and went through the perimeter wall before coming to rest. No one was killed.
- On 25 May 1998 a Fokker F27 Friendship operating as Flight 544 was hijacked. All passengers and crew escaped unhurt.
- On 17 October 2001, Pakistan International Airlines Flight 231, an Airbus A300, from Islamabad via Peshawar veered off the side of the runway after the right hand main landing gear collapsed as it touched down. The aircraft skidded and eventually came to rest in sand 50 meters from the runway. The aircraft sustained damage to its right wing structure and right engine, which partly broke off the wing. All 205 crew and passengers (which included high profile American political commentator and talk show host Tucker Carlson and his father Dick Carlson) evacuated safely. However, Tucker Carlson has erroneously claimed that the plane was flying over the Arabian Sea when it had a probable explosion in the cargo hold followed by a wing detachment resulting in its crashing into a sand dune in Dubai.
- On 1 March 2004, Pakistan International Airlines Flight 2002, an Airbus A300B4-203 with the registration AP-BBA, burst two tires whilst taking off from King Abdulaziz International Airport. Fragments of the tire were ingested by the engines, which caused them to catch fire and an aborted takeoff was performed. Due to the fire, substantial damage to the engine and the left wing caused the aircraft to be written off. All 261 passengers and 12 crew survived.
- In March 2005, Pakistan International Airlines experienced several minor accidents. This includes the wrong grease being used for the undercarriages in Pakistan airports leading to small fuselage fires. Poor maintenance in Pakistan had previously led to insufficient fuel in tanks and an engine falling onto the runway at Manchester Airport.
- On 10 July 2006 Flight 688, a Fokker F27 operating from Multan to Lahore and then to Islamabad, crashed in a field after bursting into flames a few minutes after takeoff from Multan International Airport. All 41 passengers and four crew members on board were killed.
- On 25 September 2010, a PIA Boeing 777-200LR registered AP-BGY, flying from Toronto to Karachi, made an emergency landing at Stockholm Arlanda Airport after a phone call was made claiming a passenger on board was armed with explosives. After the plane landed in Stockholm, it was parked at an emergency stand and the suspected passenger was removed from the plane by Swedish authorities. The rest of the passengers were also removed and the empty aircraft was searched. The plane and passengers were allowed to depart Sweden while the suspect was detained in the country for further investigation, but was later released after no evidence was found of the allegation made against him.
- On 31 August 2012, ATR 42–500 registration AP-BHJ, operating Flight 653 from Islamabad to Lahore, was landing at Allama Iqbal International Airport when it undershot the runway and came to rest on a grassy area on the right side of Runway 36R. There were no fatalities among the 42 passengers and four crew members. The aircraft was damaged beyond repair and withdrawn from service.
- On 11 February 2013, a Boeing 737 aircraft registered AP-BEH was operating Flight 259 from Islamabad to Muscat via Sialkot when its port side main landing gear collapsed during landing at Muscat International Airport. There were no fatalities among the 107 passengers and seven crew members on board. The aircraft was damaged beyond repair and withdrawn from service.
- On 8 June 2014, an attack took place on the grounds Jinnah International Airport in Karachi. Several aircraft were damaged and written off, including a PIA Boeing 747-367, registered as AP-BFV, and a PIA Airbus A310-308, registered as AP-BDZ. In total, there were 36 fatalities, including the 10 attackers.
- On 24 June 2014, an Airbus A310-300 registered as AP-BGN was operating Flight 756 from Riyadh to Peshawar with 178 passengers and 12 crew members on board when it was hit by gunfire during its landing approach at Bacha Khan International Airport, Peshawar. The aircraft landed safely, but one passenger was killed and two crew members were injured. The aircraft was damaged but it was later ferried to Karachi for repair.
- On 7 December 2016, Flight 661, operated by an ATR 42–500 aircraft registered AP-BHO, crashed in Havelian, Pakistan while en route from Chitral to Islamabad, killing all 47 on board.
- On 22 May 2020, Flight 8303, operated by an Airbus A320, with the registration AP-BLD, crashed while on final approach to Jinnah International Airport, Karachi, arriving from Lahore. According to CAA sources, the Airbus A320 from Lahore was about to land in Karachi when it crashed at the Jinnah Garden area near Model Colony in Malir. CAA sources said that its communication with the plane had been cut off one minute prior to the landing. The pilots attempted an unstabilised landing which resulted in a belly landing as the landing gear was not lowered due to high workload in the cockpit. This badly damaged both the engines which suffered from oil leaks due to the heavy scraping on the runway. The pilots then tried to perform a go-around attempting to make a second approach, they requested to turn left for a direct route to the runway as they were losing altitude. The pilots then declared mayday reporting they had lost both engines (both engines had flamed out due to damage). Soon after, the aircraft lost altitude and crashed into flames in the Model Colony residential area at about 14:40 local time. A ground observer reported that the aircraft suddenly became silent in its final seconds of flight. 99 people were on board; two passengers survived while 97 on board, including eight crew members, were killed. Additional casualties on the ground were one fatality and seven injured.
- On 18 January 2025, the captain and first officer of flight PK150 from Dammam to Multan was grounded for landing the plane at the wrong runway. The flight was initially diverted to Lahore Airport due to bad weather condition and heavy fog in Multan.
- On 13 March 2025, Flight 306, an Airbus A320 flying from Karachi to Lahore, landed at Lahore with one tire missing in its main landing gear. The missing tire was found at Jinnah International Airport where the aircraft departed from.

== See also ==
- List of airlines of Pakistan
- Transport in Pakistan

== Bibliography ==
- Salim, M.M. The story of air transport in Pakistan. Karachi.
- Urdang, Laurence; Robbins, Ceila Dame (1984). Slogans. Gale Research Company. p. 36. ISBN 978-0-81-031549-5.
