= Hollenhorst =

Hollenhorst is a surname. Notable people with the surname include:

- Robert Hollenhorst (1913–2008), American ophthalmologist
  - Hollenhorst plaque
- Steve Hollenhorst (born 1959), American environmental scientist
