= Grace Wang =

The name Grace Wang may refer to:

- Grace Wang (academic administrator), Chinese-American materials scientist and academic administrator
- Grace Wang (sustainability scholar), American sustainability scholar
- Guiling Wang, Chinese-born computer scientist
- Wang Laichun, Chinese businesswoman
