= Grace Wang (sustainability scholar) =

American sustainability scholar (born c. 1969)

- Born: Grace A. Wang c. 1969

Academic background
- Education: University of California, Berkeley (BS); University of Minnesota (MS, PhD)

Academic work
- Discipline: Environmental policy; forestry; natural resources; sustainability
- Institutions: Pennsylvania State University; Western Washington University

Grace A. Wang (born c. 1969) is an American sustainability scholar and professor at Western Washington University. At the university, she is a professor in the Department of Urban and Environmental Planning and Policy and director of the Sustainability Engagement Institute. Wang is best known for her publications on public lands and natural resource management, and for her advocacy of sustainability in higher education curricula and operations.

== Early life and education ==
Grace Wang was born in circa 1969, and is of Taiwanese descent. She grew up in the Seattle area of Washington state, and was drawn to natural resource conservation through her time spent camping and fishing with family. She attended the University of California, Berkeley, from which she received a B.S. degree in the political economy of natural resources. She then attended the University of Minnesota, where she attained M.S. and Ph.D. degrees in forestry.

Her graduate research at the University of Minnesota, advised by Dorothy H. Anderson, focused on cultural resource and heritage management within the U.S. Forest Service and their links to ecosystems, culminating in a case study at Mount Hood in Oregon. This work was presented at the International Association for Society and Natural Resources conference and in the society's journal.

== Career ==
After receiving her doctorate, Wang worked at Pennsylvania State University in University Park, Pennsylvania, as an assistant professor of natural resources policy. She left Penn State in 2002 to accept a position at Western Washington University (Western) in Bellingham, Washington. Wang joined Western as an assistant professor, and became an associate professor for the 2006–2007 academic year. She has been a full professor since 2018–2019. A sustainability studies minor was established for the 2015–2016 academic year, and Wang was made the academic program director for sustainability.

Since joining Western, she has taken on multiple roles within the College of the Environment, notably including service as chair of the Department of Environmental Studies (academic years 2018–2019 through 2020–2021) and Department of Urban and Environmental Planning and Policy (academic year 2021–2022). Wang was chair of the environmental studies department during its split into environmental studies and urban and environmental planning and policy; she joined the latter department.

Western's Facing the Future program publishes sustainability curricula for educators. In 2018, Wang authored the second edition of their middle school course resource, Global Sustainability Issues: Population, Poverty, Consumption, and the Environment. This second edition includes a greater emphasis on global climate change and strategies for countering overconsumption.

Also in 2018, the then-president of Western, Sabah Randhawa, honored Wang and others who wrote the university's Sustainability Action Plan with the Team Recognition Award. The Front, a student newspaper at Western, reported in June 2021 that action towards the 2017 Sustainability Action Plan was stalling, largely due to lingering effects of the COVID-19 pandemic and participation in the plan being only voluntary. Wang was a member of the Sustainability Advisory Committee, which wrote the plan. At the time, sustainability at Western was overseen by the Office of Sustainability.

The Office of Sustainability became the Sustainability Engagement Institute after a change in status in 2021. Since its establishment, Wang has served as the institute's director. The institute has been designated by AASHE as a Center for Sustainability Across the Curriculum, in recognition of its "experience organizing sustainability-oriented professional development for [its] own faculty". Within the scope of sustainability at Western, Wang also served as the chair of the President's Sustainability Council from its founding in 2022 until 2024. She is additionally the director of Curriculum for the Bioregion, an initiative at Western aimed at building sustainability into college courses; it includes a curriculum collection hosted by the Science Education Resource Center at Carleton College.

Outside of her institution, Wang is an editorial board member for the journal Sustainability and Climate Change, a board of directors member of the Northwest Natural Resource Group, and sits on the Bellingham Public Schools Sustainability Task Force. Wang was also formerly a member of the board of governors of the Sehome Hill Arboretum, which is jointly managed by the City of Bellingham and Western Washington University.

== Teaching and speaking ==
Wang's academic focus includes teaching courses on natural resource policy, sustainability, community-based forestry, and cultural resources management. Guest speakers in Wang's classes have included the recycling manager of a Bellingham-based waste collection company. Although she includes recycling in her curriculum, Wang also advocates for the interpretation that "sustainability is more than recycling" and "more than just the environment". As a member of the academic community, she has also been a registered attendee of multiple conferences, including as a presenter for the 2021 Climate Action Pursuit by Second Nature and speaker at the 2024 Washington Oregon Higher Education Sustainability Conference.

In 2018, after President Donald Trump pardoned participants in the 2016 occupation of the Malheur National Wildlife Refuge, Wang was interviewed by PBS News Weekend as an expert on public lands. She warned that Trump's pardons could embolden future militants to threaten public lands and federal workers.

During the 2020 City of Bellingham Climate Action Week, Wang was one of the "Bellingham celebrities" who appeared on Climate Squares, a local version of Hollywood Squares that aired on the television channel BTV. The event was the closer of the city's action week, and included the mayor of Bellingham among the other panelists.

In her role as the director of the Sustainability Engagement Institute, Wang is also sponsored by the Association for the Advancement of Sustainability in Higher Education as a sustainability consultant. In 2023 and 2024, she hosted a series of workshops at the University of Notre Dame to train faculty in developing academic courses with a focus on sustainability.

In 2024 and 2025, Wang spoke at Sehome High School for their commemorations of Earth Day. Separately, for the 2024 election cycle, Wang gave a statement to the Salish Current in which she explained impacts of the campaign platforms of Washington State Commissioner of Public Lands candidates. In a panel at Sehome for the 2025 Earth Day assembly, Wang stated that election of effective officials can mitigate the impacts of climate change and bring hope to communities. In the panel, Wang referenced as an example how Dave Upthegrove's election as Commissioner of Public Lands will lead to the protection of legacy forests.

== Personal life ==
Wang was the partner of fellow WWU professor Ethan Remmel until his death from metastatic colon cancer in 2011. Their son, Miles, was born in circa 2007. As of 2023, Wang's partner is Dave Tucker, a Bellingham geologist.

== Publications ==
=== Journal articles and book chapters ===
- Wang, Grace A.; Anderson, Dorothy H.; Jakes, Pamela J. (January 1996). "Legislating the past: Cultural resource management in the U.S. forest service". Society & Natural Resources. 9 (1): 3–18. Bibcode:1996SNatR...9....3W. doi:10.1080/08941929609380948. ISSN 0894-1920.
- Wang, Grace A.; Anderson, Dorothy H.; Jakes, Pamela J. (April 2002). "Heritage Management in the U.S. Forest Service: A Mount Hood National Forest Case Study". Society & Natural Resources. 15 (4): 359–369. Bibcode:2002SNatR..15..359W. doi:10.1080/089419202753570837. ISSN 0894-1920.
- Clark, William A.; and Wang, Grace A. (March 2003). "Conflicting Attitudes Toward Inter-basin Water Transfers in Bulgaria". Water International. 28 (1): 79–89. Bibcode:2003WatIn..28...79C. doi:10.1080/02508060308691667. ISSN 0250-8060.
- Stedman, Richard; Diefenbach, Duane R.; Swope, Craig B.; Finley, James C.; Luloff, A. E.; Zinn, Harry C.; San Julian, Gary J.; Wang, Grace A. (October 2004). "Integrating Wildlife and Human-Dimensions Research Methods to Study Hunters". Journal of Wildlife Management. 68 (4): 762–773. doi:10.2193/0022-541X(2004)068[0762:IWAHRM]2.0.CO;2. ISSN 0022-541X. JSTOR 3803633.
- Wang, Grace A. (December 2018). "Who Controls the Land? Lessons from Armed Takeover of the Malheur National Wildlife Refuge". Case Studies in the Environment. 2 (1): 1–6. Bibcode:2018CSEnv...2..778W. doi:10.1525/cse.2017.000778. ISSN 2473-9510.
- Wang, Grace (April 2019). "Viewing the UN SDGs through Core Curriculum in Higher Education". Sustainability. 12 (2): 77–78. Bibcode:2019SusJR..12...77W. doi:10.1089/sus.2019.29153. ISSN 1937-0695.
- Schelhas, John; Brown, Jasmine K.; Dockry, Michael; Hitchner, Sarah; Naiman, Sarah; Wang, Grace (May 2024). "Recent Advances in Race, Ethnicity, and Natural Resources". In Sherren, Kate; Thondhlana, Gladman; Jackson-Smith, Douglas (eds.). Opening Windows. Society and Natural Resources Book Series. Utah State University Press. pp. 34–72. doi:10.7330/9781646426300.c003. hdl:10217/238164. JSTOR jj.13027301.

=== Books ===
- Wang, Grace A. (2018). Global Sustainability Issues: Population, Poverty, Consumption, and the Environment (2nd ed.). Facing the Future. ISBN 978-1-940829-15-9. LCCN 2019462865.
- Enger, Eldon D.; Smith, Bradley F. (2021). Environmental Science: A Study of Interrelationships. Contributing Authors: Craig D. Phelps, Maarten Vonhof, David Murphy, Grace Wang (16th ed.). McGraw Hill. ISBN 978-1-260-72223-9. LCCN 2020042083.
- Enger, Eldon D.; Smith, Bradley F. (January 22, 2021). Environmental Science: A Study of Interrelationships. Contributing Authors: Craig D. Phelps, Maarten Vonhof, David Murphy, Grace Wang (16th High School ed.). McGraw Hill. ISBN 978-1-264-33368-4.
