= Huxley College =

Huxley College may refer to:

- Huxley College of the Environment, an interdisciplinary environmental college at Western Washington University.
- Huxley College, a fictional college in the famous 1932 Marx Brothers film, Horse Feathers.
