= Steve Hollenhorst =

Environmental scholar

Steven Jon Hollenhorst (born December 2, 1959) is an American environmental scholar and former dean in the College of the Environment at Western Washington University. He is the founder of the West Virginia Land Trust and the McCall Outdoor Science School (MOSS). His scholarship focuses on protected area policy and management, land trusts and conservation easements, and environmental resource management. He undertook some of the first empirical studies of the extreme/adventure sports phenomenon as it unfolded in the 1980s and 1990s. He is the former editor of the academic journals Society and Natural Resources, and the International Journal of Wilderness.

== Early life and education ==
Hollenhorst is from Robbinsdale, Minnesota, where he graduated from Robbinsdale High School in 1978. He attended St. Cloud State University before transferring to the University of Oregon where he earned a bachelors and masters degree. He received his Ph.D. from Ohio State University in 1987.

== Selected publications ==
Hollenhorst, S. and H. Sharfstein. 2021. Creating a Carbon Conservation Trust Movement. Medium.

Hollenhorst. S. and W. Landis. 2021. Reconsider cancel-culture target at WWU. Seattle Times, May 7, 2021.

Landis, W., D. Leaf and S. Hollenhorst. 2021. Standing Up to Anti-Evolutionism: Finding a win-win outcome for justice and science in the Huxley College name issue. The Planet Magazine, May 7, 2021.

Hollenhorst, Steven J.; Houge-Mackenzie, S.; Ostergren, David M. (2014). The Trouble with Tourism. Tourism Recreation Research. 39 (3): 305–319.

Wang, L. and S. Hollenhorst. 2014. 创建统一的中华国家公园体系——美国历史经验的启示 (Building a unified Chinese national park system: Historical lessons learned from the United States) 地理研究 (Geographical Research), 33(12): 2407-2417.

Houge Mackenzie, S., J. S. Son, S. Hollenhorst. 2014. Unifying psychology and experiential education: Toward an integrated understanding of why it works. Journal of Experiential Education, 37(1):1-14.

Ostergren, D. and S. Hollenhorst. 1999. Convergence in Protected Area Policy: A comparison of the Russian Zapovednik and American Wilderness systems. Society and Natural Resources, 12:293-313.

Hollenhorst, S., and A. Ewert. 1989. Testing the adventure model: empirical support for a model of risk recreation participation. Journal of Leisure Research 20(3). According to Google Scholar, this article has been cited 415 times

Morse, W. C., J. L. Schedlbauer, S. E. Sesnie, B. Finegan, C. A. Harvey, S. J. Hollenhorst, K. L. Kavanagh, D. Stoian, and J. D. Wulfhorst. 2009. Consequences of environmental service payments for forest retention and recruitment in a Costa Rican biological corridor. Ecology and Society 14(1):23.

Le, Y., S. Hollenhorst, C. Harris, W. McLaughlin, and S. Shook, 2005. Environmental management: A study of Vietnamese hotels. Annals of Tourism Research, 16(1):79-99.[13].

Hollenhorst, S. and C. Jones. 2001. Wilderness Solitude: Beyond the Social-Spatial Perspective. In: Freimund, Wayne A.; Cole, David N., comps. 2001. Social Density and Wilderness Experiences; 2000 June 1–3; Missoula, MT. Proceedings RMRS-P-20. Ogden, UT: U.S. Department of Agriculture, Forest Service, Rocky Mountain Research Station. 67 p.[25].

Nepyivoda, V. and S. Hollenhorst. 2000. Охоронні обмеження як ефективний інструмент захисту природної та історичної спадщини: досвід США. (Conservation easements as an effective instrument for conservation of natural and historic heritage: the U.S. Experience.) Pravo Ukrayiny (Ukrainian Law), No 12:109-112.
