= Arlington College =

Arlington College might refer to one of several academic institutions, including:

- Arlington College, the school that eventually became the University of Texas at Arlington
- Arlington College, a Christian school in California that merged into Azusa Pacific University
