= Asia Region Funds Passport =

The Asia Region Funds Passport is an economic initiative to provide regional management of funds throughout member states in Asia. It is led by Australia, Singapore, New Zealand and the Republic of Korea, all of whom signed a Statement of Intent on 20 September 2013 at the APEC Finance Ministers’ meeting in Nusa Dua, Bali.

The ministers from these economies signed with a view that their economies can potentially become members of the passport once it is launched in 2016, and that they agree with the principles set out in the framework document. This document forms the basis of the future passport arrangements.

The possibility exists for the passport to grow beyond Asia to Europe, if a mutual recognition agreement is signed.

== History ==
The passport was first mentioned in the 2010 Johnson report by the Australian Financial Centre Forum (ARFP).

PwC released a report commissioned by the Australian Financial Services Council in November 2010, that provided a qualitative analysis of reception to the ARFP idea and potential upside.

In partnership with Volguard, APEC published a quantitative study in July 2014, of the economic benefits and costs of the ARFP to the individual economies and the Asia region. Through the extensive assessment conducted by Volguard Analytics, the potential gains from the ARFP were measured against their potential risks.
