= Karen Morse =

Karen Morse may refer to:

- Karen Morse (chemist)
- Karen Morse (water skier)
