= Henry Kirby Taylor =

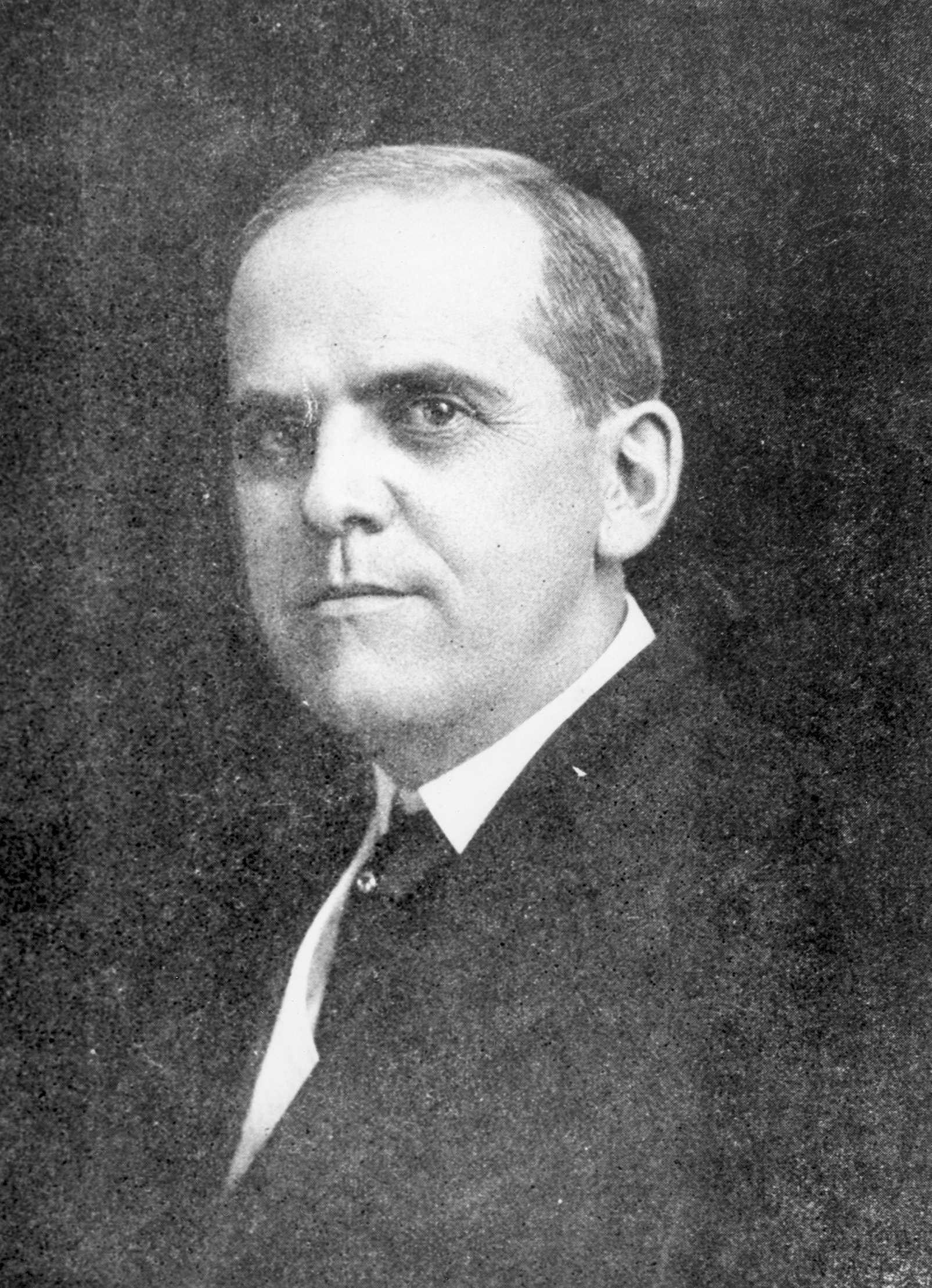
- Henry Kirby Taylor, while director of Arlington Training School, circa 1913-1916
- Born: 10 August 1858; Vanceburg, Kentucky, US
- Died: 21 January 1934; Arlington, Texas, US
- Education: MA Kentucky Wesleyan
- Known for: President; Kentucky Wesleyan; Northwest Missouri State University; Arlington Training School

Henry Kirby Taylor (August 10, 1858 – January 21, 1934) was president of Kentucky Wesleyan College, Northwest Missouri State University and the Arlington Training School.

== Early life ==
Taylor was born in Vanceburg, Kentucky.

== Kentucky Wesleyan ==
Taylor earned a master's degree from Kentucky Wesleyan and was the school's president from 1906 to 1909.

== Northwest Missouri ==
Taylor was president of Northwest from 1909 to 1913.

After Taylor arrived at Northwest, his predecessor Homer Martien Cook continued living in the President's house for four months, so the school had two de facto presidents during this period.

Taylor addressed numerous fiscal problems at the young university including paying back salaries to faculty (even though he went without himself). He also settled the squabbles that had halted construction on the Administration Building which opened in December 1910 during his watch.

Other highlights included:

- The first school newspaper issue in February 1910 (then called the Normal Index).
- A dispute with Maryville, Missouri, resulted in the town cutting off municipal water
- The opening of a drive through the campus connecting Fourth Street and Seventh Street.

== Arlington Training School ==
Taylor was president of the Arlington Training School from 1913 to 1916, which became the Arlington Military Academy. Prior to his arrival, it was the Carlisle Military Academy and he was attracted to the school because his son-in-law, Josiah Jernigan Godbey, as head master. Today, the school is the University of Texas at Arlington.

Taylor left the school to join the faculty at Texas Women's University and later Southern Methodist University. He died in Arlington on January 21, 1934.

Academic offices
Preceded by Homer Martien Cook	President of the Northwest Missouri State University; 1909–1913	Succeeded by Ira Richardson
