= Homer Martien Cook =

2nd President of Northwest Missouri State University
- In office 1907–1909
- Preceded by: Frank Deerwester
- Succeeded by: Henry Kirby Taylor

Homer Martien Cook (1869–1948) was president of Northwest Missouri State University.

He was born in La Grange, Missouri. At LaGrange College he received a bachelor's degree in 1890, a master's degree in 1904 from the University of Chicago and an LLd from the Columbia School of Expression in Chicago in 1906.

He was pastor of the Maryville Baptist Church and taught physical culture and expression at the newly organized Northwest.

During his tenure the school was beset by fiscal problems and faculty was not paid. Work stopped on the Administration Building.

He quit in the summer of 1909 but was allowed to continue to live in the Northwest President house from Sept. 1, 1909 to Jan. 1, 1910 while his successor Henry Kirby Taylor was president in effect creating two presidents of the college for four months.

Academic offices
Preceded by Frank Deerwester	President of the Northwest Missouri State University; 1907-1909	Succeeded by Henry Kirby Taylor
