= Frank Deerwester =

1st President of Northwest Missouri State University
- In office 1906–1907
- Preceded by: None
- Succeeded by: Homer Martien Cook

Personal details
- Born: Bates County, Missouri, U.S.
- Died: 1926

Frank Deerwester (died May 26, 1926) was the first president of Northwest Missouri State University from 1906 to 1907.

== Biography ==
Butler was born in Bates County, Missouri and attended Butler College, the Second District Normal School, New York University, the University of Chicago and Harvard.

During his first year he fought funding battles over the Administration Building and set up education standards for the school.

Deerwester came from Warrensburg, where he was professor of Pedagogy and he continued to teach the subject as well as be president.

The Fifth District Normal School opened on June 11, 1906, with Eliza Munn as the first student.

After leaving Northwest, he taught at Pittsburg State University and Western Washington University.

Academic offices
Preceded by None	President of the Northwest Missouri State University; 1906-1907	Succeeded by Homer Martien Cook
