= Western Washington University =

Public university in Bellingham, Washington, U.S.

- Former names: New Whatcom Normal School; Western Washington College of Education; Western Washington State College; (More...)
- Motto: "Make Waves"
- Type: Public university
- Established: February 24, 1893; 133 years ago
- Accreditation: NWCCU
- Endowment: $165.4 million (2025)
- President: Sabah Randhawa
- Provost: Brad Johnson
- Faculty: 683 full time (2024)
- Administrative staff: 1,332 (2024)
- Students: 14,710 (2024)
- Undergraduates: 13,752 (2024)
- Postgraduates: 958 (2024)
- Location: Bellingham, Washington, United States; 48°44′02″N 122°29′10″W
- Campus: 215 acres; Small city
- Other locations: Anacortes; Bremerton; Everett; Kirkland; Port Angeles; Poulsbo; Renton
- Newspaper: The Front
- Colors: Blue, light blue, gray, black, and white
- Nickname: Vikings
- Sporting affiliations: NCAA Division II – GNAC
- Mascot: Victor E. Viking
- Website: wwu.edu

- Location in Washington

Western Washington University (WWU or Western) is a public university in Bellingham, Washington, United States. It was established in 1893 as the state-funded New Whatcom Normal School, succeeding a private teachers' school founded in 1886. The university adopted its present name in 1977.

WWU offers bachelor's, master's and select doctoral degrees. In fall 2024, there were 14,710 students, including 13,752 undergraduates, and 683 full-time faculty. The university is classified as a research university in the Carnegie Classification. Its athletic teams are known as the Vikings, and compete in Division II of the National Collegiate Athletic Association.

The main campus sits on 215 acres in Bellingham. WWU also operates the Shannon Point Marine Center in Anacortes and academic locations in Everett and on the Olympic and Kitsap peninsulas. WWU is accredited by the Northwest Commission on Colleges and Universities.

== History ==
In 1886, Phoebe Judson established WWU's predecessor, the Northwest Normal School, a training institute for teachers in Lynden, Washington. Local leaders called on the territorial legislature to fund the school, but were declined on the grounds that there were already state-funded normal schools in Cheney (now Eastern Washington University) and Ellensburg (Central Washington University). The school closed in 1892.

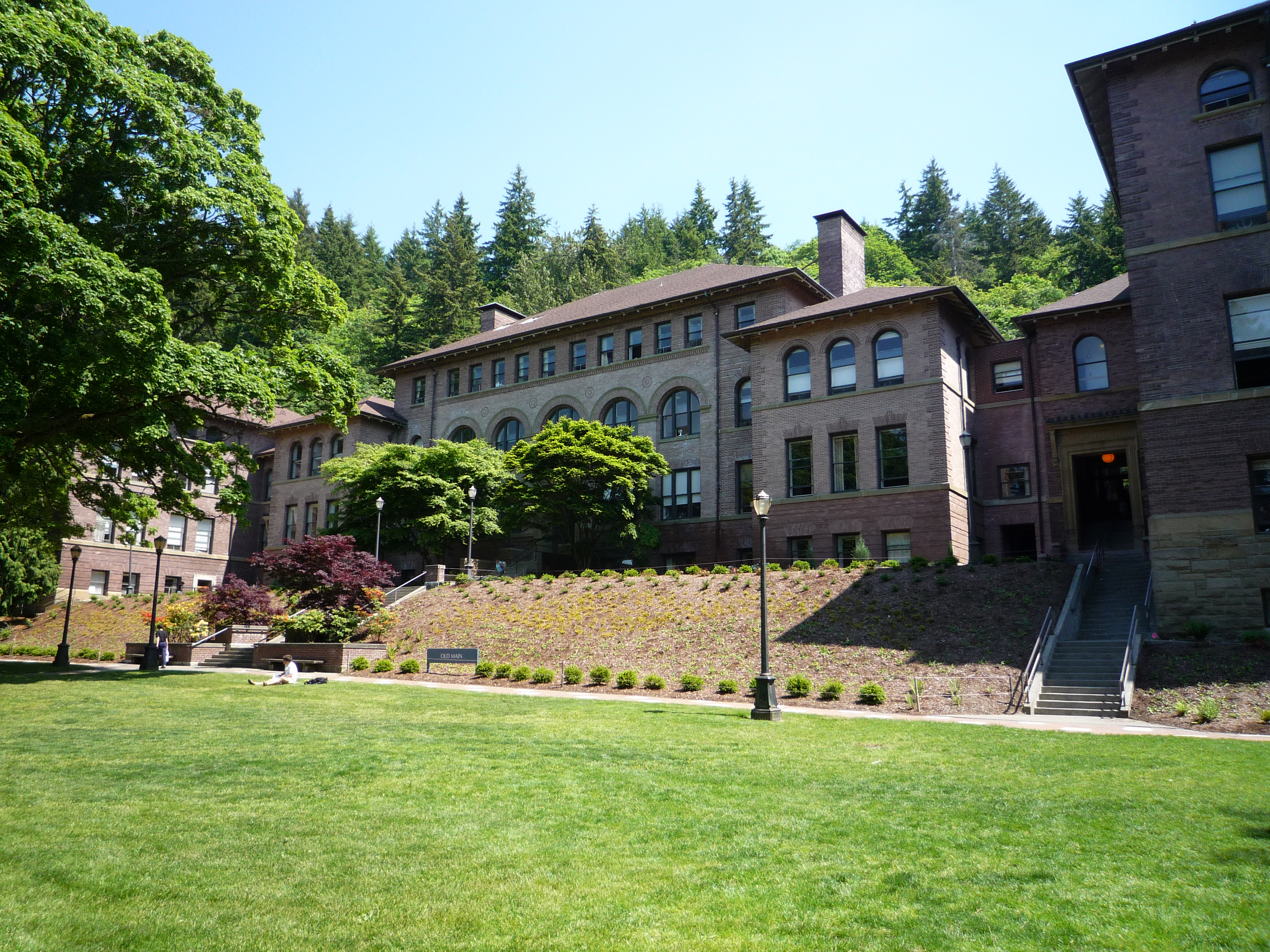
Old Main

Governor John McGraw chartered the New Whatcom Normal School on February 24, 1893, and Whatcom County businesses and residents donated 10 acres (4 ha) of land in Bellingham, then called New Whatcom, for the institution. McGraw originally vetoed funding for construction, though an appropriation of $40,000 was made the next year.

The first building was planned in 1895 by architects Skillings & Corner of Seattle and was inspired by the Boston Public Library. Old Main, as it is now known, was completed in 1896, though the construction contract did not include such things as heating. After a provision for operating costs was made in 1899, the school was able to open.

The first class, presided over by Principal Edward T. Mathes, entered that year. Originally comprising 88 students, the class grew to 160 before the end of the week and 264 by the end of the academic year. Most of the students were young women. Upon the city changing its name in 1901, the school became the State Normal School at Whatcom, and after the city of Bellingham incorporated, the school again changed its name to the Washington State Normal School at Bellingham in 1904.

In 1906, Alma Clark Glass became the first Black student of the institution, attending with the support of Mathes. A student association (now Associated Students of WWU) was founded in 1908.

George W. Nash succeeded Mathes in 1914 and took the title of President. By the end of his tenure in 1922, the enrollment of the school had more than doubled to 1,373. In 1933, the institution became authorized to grant Bachelor of Arts in Education degrees. The standardization of education during this time shaped the school, and under the leadership of Charles H. Fisher, the school transitioned to teaching a broader liberal arts education. Four-year education became the standard for students, and the school's name changed to Western Washington College of Education in 1937.

Attendance dropped by nearly half upon the onset of World War II, but in 1946 enrollment again doubled and male freshman outnumbered females for the first time. The next year, the college was authorized by the legislature to grant Master of Arts in Education degrees and Bachelor of Arts degrees in liberal arts.

In 1961, the college became Western Washington State College. The 1960s were a period of rapid growth for Western, as its enrollment grew from roughly 3,000 to over 10,000 during the decade. In 1968, Fairhaven College of Interdisciplinary Studies was founded as one of Western's "cluster colleges"—providing a focused, more intimate learning environment. Huxley College of the Environment opened in 1969, the first college in the United States dedicated to interdisciplinary environmental studies. The third cluster college, the College of Ethnic Studies, also opened that year.

Two days after the Kent State shootings in 1970, Western students blocked Interstate 5 to protest the Vietnam War.

The College of Arts and Sciences was established in 1973, the College of Fine and Performing Arts was established in 1975, and the College of Business and Economics was established in 1976. Attaining university status the next year, the college became Western Washington University. In 1978, the College of Ethnic Studies was dismantled.

The university's president G. Robert Ross died in a plane crash in 1983. In 1989, the Woodring College of Education was established. In 1993, Karen Morse became the first woman to serve as president of the institution. The College of Arts and Sciences split into the College of Humanities and Social Sciences and the College of Sciences and Technology in 2003; the latter was renamed College of Science and Engineering in 2014.

President Bruce Shepard served from 2008 to 2016. During his term, he cancelled classes for a day in November 2015 after hate speech towards students of color was posted on social media. Shepard retired at the end of the 2015–2016 academic year. Sabah Randhawa became president in 2016, the first person of color in the role.

Between 2016 and 2019, the university awarded credit for work that was never actually completed. These "ghost courses" were added to transcripts so students would qualify for federal financial aid. An internal auditor who reported the alleged fraud was fired and later awarded over $2 million in a lawsuit.

"Make Waves" became the university's tagline in 2019, replacing "Active Minds Changing Lives", which had been adopted as the slogan in 2011.

Western removed the name "Huxley" from the College of the Environment in 2021, citing that namesake Thomas Henry Huxley held racist views; a task force disagreed with the notion put forward that Huxley's beliefs were "uncommonly progressive". Dean Steve Hollenhorst was among those opposed to the change, stating: "Huxley's message [is] timeless. The values he fought for are at the core of public higher education to this day."

As of 2024, the university, with 14,700 students, is the third-largest in the state, after the University of Washington and Washington State University.

== Campus ==
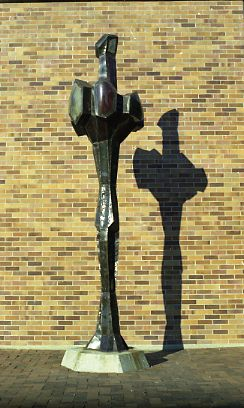
Scepter (1966) by Steve Tibbetts

The northernmost university in the contiguous United States, WWU's main campus is in Bellingham, Washington, a city of around 95,000 residents. The university sits on over 200 acres and overlooks Bellingham Bay and some of the San Juan Islands. It is located roughly 90 miles north of Seattle and 50 miles south of Vancouver, Canada, and is less than an hour's drive from the Mt. Baker Ski Area.

Western's 215-acre (87 ha) campus at 516 High Street, Bellingham, is adjacent to the Sehome Hill Arboretum, which is jointly managed by the university and the city of Bellingham. Facilities on campus include dedicated rooms for video editing, audio editing, and virtual reality, an art gallery, a recreation center with a six-lane pool, hot tub, and climbing wall, and multiple scanning electron microscopes.

The university also operates the Shannon Point Marine Center, a 78-acre coastal research center in Anacortes, and Lakewood, a waterfront facility and boathouse on Lake Whatcom. Its other locations are WWU on the Peninsulas, serving local students in Poulsbo and Bremerton on the Kitsap Peninsula and in Port Angeles on the Olympic Peninsula, and WWU in Everett, a program in education and business in Everett. The university also offers multilingual teaching and cybersecurity programs in Renton and Kirkland, respectively.

=== Sculpture collection ===
In 1959, Western first included art acquisition costs in its construction budget. Since the installation of Rain Forest by James FitzGerald in 1960, Western has maintained a collection of university-owned outdoor and indoor sculptures. The collection today includes over 30 works, including sculptures by artists such as Isamu Noguchi, Robert Morris, Mark di Suvero, Anthony Caro, Nancy Holt, Beverly Pepper, Richard Serra, Donald Judd, and Bruce Nauman. Some of the collection's most noteworthy pieces were donated by Virginia Wright.

== Administration ==
As of 2026, the university's president is Sabah Randhawa and the provost is Brad Johnson. In fall 2024, the university employed 683 full-time faculty members and 1,332 other staff members. Western is a member of the Council of Presidents, Washington's association of its six public baccalaureate-granting colleges and universities.

Western's endowment was valued at approximately $144.2 million in 2024, and 165.4 million in 2025. The board of trustees approved a state operating budget of $234.7 million for the 2025–2026 fiscal year.

Presidents
| Number | Term | Name |
|---|---|---|
| 1 | 1899–1914 | Edward T. Mathes |
| – | 1914 (acting) | Frank Deerwester |
| 2 | 1914–1922 | George W. Nash |
| 3 | 1922–1923 | Dwight B. Waldo |
| 4 | 1923–1939 | Charles H. Fisher |
| 5 | 1939–1959 | William Wade Haggard |
| 6 | 1959–1964 | James L. Jarrett |
| – | 1964–1965 (acting) | Paul Woodring |
| 7 | 1965–1967 | Harvey C. Bunke |
| 8 | 1967–1975 | Charles J. Flora |
| 9 | 1975–1982 | Paul J. Olscamp |
| – | 1982–1983 (acting) | James Talbot |
| 10 | 1983–1987 | G. Robert Ross |
| – | 1987–1988 (interim) | Al Froderberg |
| 11 | 1988–1993 | Kenneth P. Mortimer |
| – | 1993 (interim) | Roland DeLorme |
| 12 | 1993–2008 | Karen W. Morse |
| 13 | 2008–2016 | W. Bruce Shepard |
| 14 | 2016–present | Sabah Randhawa |

== Academics ==
Western Washington University offers "the benefits of a small liberal arts college" but enrolls over 10,000 students between the undergraduate and graduate levels. The university has an honors college, established in 1962, offering smaller classes and additional research opportunities.

=== Organization ===
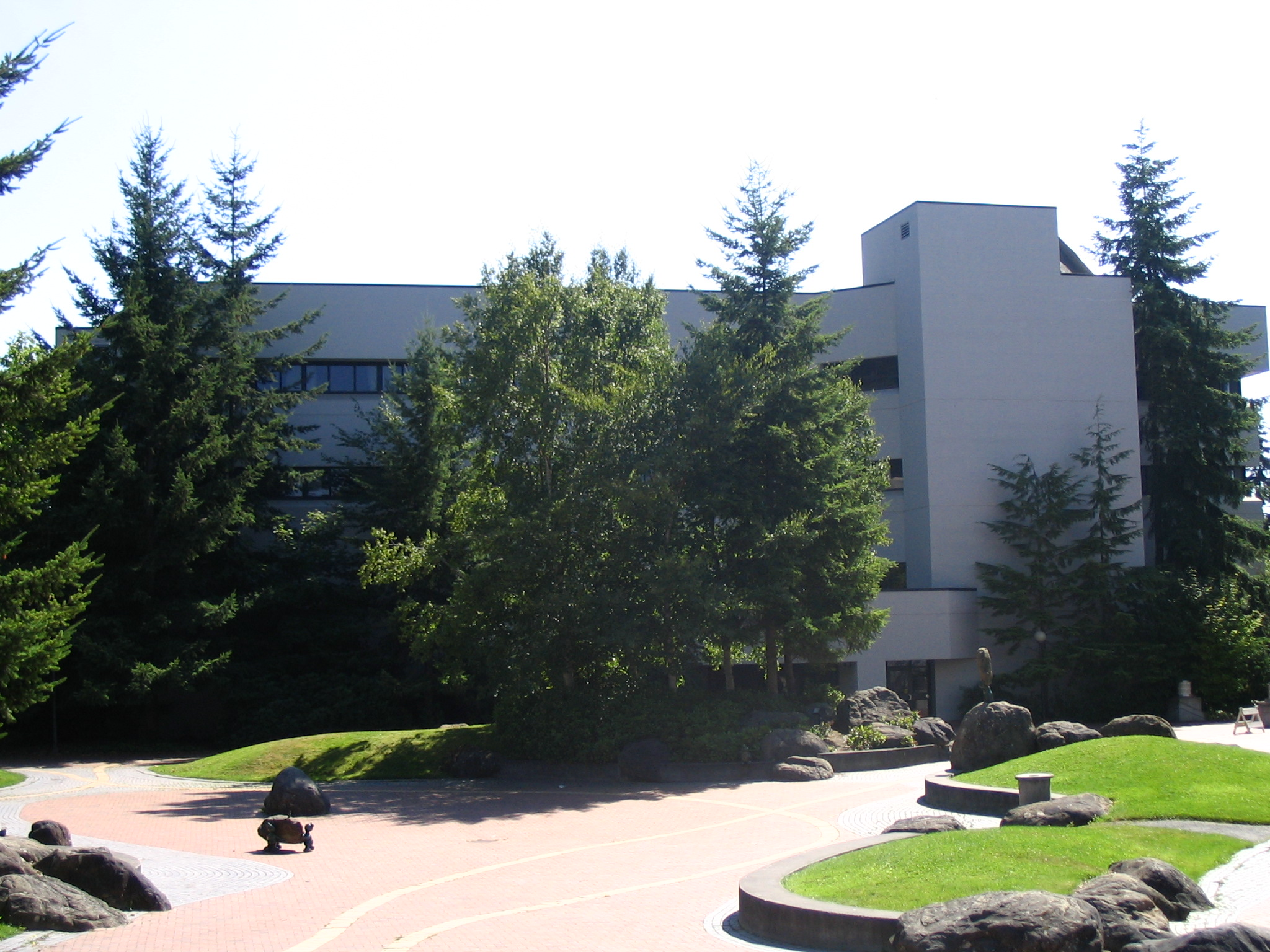
Parks Hall, home to the College of Business and Economics

Western offers multiple bachelor's degrees, as well as the master's degrees of Master of Arts, Master of Science, Master of Education, Master of Fine Arts, Master of Music, Master of Business Administration, Master of Professional Accounting, Master of Social Work, and Master in Teaching. The doctoral degrees offered are Clinical Doctorate in Audiology and Doctor of Education. The university is organized into the following colleges:

- College of Humanities and Social Sciences
- College of Science and Engineering
- College of Business and Economics
- College of Fine and Performing Arts
- Fairhaven College of Interdisciplinary Studies
- College of the Environment
- Woodring College of Education

While some centers and institutes fall under a specific college or department, some are university-wide Academic Programs, Institutes, and Centers (APICs). There are APICs in border policy, Canadian–American studies, disability studies, energy, marine and coastal science, leadership, genocide and crimes against humanity, sustainability, and the Salish Sea. APICs report to the provost's office. The WWU Center for Canadian-American Studies, in partnership with the University of Washington, constitutes the only U.S. Department of Education–designated National Resource Center on Canada.

=== Accreditation ===
The university offers an undergraduate program in urban planning and sustainable development, one of 16 programs in North America that offers a bachelor's degree accredited by the Planning Accreditation Board.

WWU is accredited by the Northwest Commission on Colleges and Universities. Others accreditors for specific programs include:

- Accreditation Board for Engineering and Technology
- American Chemical Society
- American Speech–Language–Hearing Association
- Association to Advance Collegiate Schools of Business
- Commission on Collegiate Nursing Education
- Commission on English Language Program Accreditation
- Council for Accreditation of Counseling and Related Educational Programs
- Council on Accreditation of Parks, Recreation, Tourism and Related Professions
- Council on Education for Public Health
- National Association of Schools of Music
- National Council for Accreditation of Teacher Education
- Planning Accreditation Board

=== Rankings ===
In the 2026 Best Colleges ranking by U.S. News, Western ranked 23rd in Regional Universities West, down from 18th in 2025, placing it 13th among the region's public schools, also down from 9th the previous year. After the Bothell and Tacoma campuses of the University of Washington, Western is third in the Pacific Northwest among the category's public schools. It also ranked 16 in "Best Colleges for Veterans". Washington Monthly ranked Western number 65 nationally in their 2025 college guide.

In 2024, the Peace Corps ranked Western the top all-time producer of Peace Corps volunteers among medium-sized colleges and universities. Western is also a Fulbright Program Top Producing Institution, and is ranked third among master's universities for the number of research doctorate recipients among its baccalaureate graduates.

Western was ranked 155th among 328 participating institutions in the Sierra Club's 2021 Cool Schools ranking of sustainable colleges and universities. Additionally, from 2020 through 2022, the university was recognized by the Great Colleges to Work For program, published by ModernThink and The Chronicle of Higher Education.

According to the Philosophical Gourmet Report in 2011, Western has one of the nation's best philosophy departments among colleges and universities that offer only a B.A. in the discipline. Western was among only seven public universities so honored. Automobile magazine called Western "very possibly the best school in the country for total car design". The WWU Vehicle Research Institute has since closed.

== Research ==
In 2024, WWU's R&D expenditures were $23.3 million, including about $18 million for science and $2 million for the social sciences. The dean of the Graduate School at WWU also serves as the vice provost for research and supports research activities on campus. Since the introduction of separate research designations in the Carnegie Classification of Institutions of Higher Education in 2025, Western has been classified as a research university. In terms of scientific instrumentation, the university has chromatography and crystallography autosamplers, elemental analysis spectrometers, and scanning electron microscopes.

== Athletics ==
The university has varsity, club, and intramural sports. WWU's athletics nickname is the Vikings, and they are represented by mascot Victor E. Viking.

Western's varsity teams compete in the Great Northwest Athletic Conference of the NCAA's Division II. The men's club rowing team competes in American Collegiate Rowing Association competitions. The club sailing team competes in the Pacific Coast Collegiate Sailing Conference of the Inter-Collegiate Sailing Association.

Formerly, Western competed in the National Association of Intercollegiate Athletics. In 1998, the softball team won the NAIA national championship, marking the Vikings' first national title. The Vikings joined the NCAA Division II ranks in September 1998. In 2017–18, approximately 300 students participated in varsity athletics between 15 men's and women's sports. As of 2025–26, Western fields 13 varsity sports—men's and women's basketball, cross country, golf, soccer, and track and field, as well as women's rowing, softball, and volleyball—plus one additional sport: cheer. From 1903 until it was cut in 2009, the university also had a football team.

In the 2016–17 Learfield Directors' Cup standings, Western finished 11th in Division II. After its first 19 seasons, it had placed in the top 100 each time. In 2009–10, the Vikings ranked sixth. Western won its seventh straight Great Northwest Athletic Conference All-Sports Championship in the 2015–15 season. The next year, they placed second, behind Alaska Anchorage.

The Vikings have won an NAIA national championship in softball, as well as 13 national titles in the NCAA. The women's rowing team has won two National Collegiate Rowing Championships (1984, 1996) and eight Division II national championships (2005, 2006, 2007, 2008, 2009, 2010, 2011, 2017, 2024), while two other sports have won a Division II national championship: men's basketball in 2012 and women's soccer in 2016. WWU athletes have also won individual national championships in track and field.

For club sports, the university has men's hockey in the Pac 8 division of ACHA and mens' and women's baseball, lacrosse, rugby, ultimate frisbee, volleyball, water polo, and sailing, plus men's rowing and co-ed sailing. The men's rugby team won a College Rugby Association of America national championship in 2026.

== Student life ==
Undergraduate demographics
| Race and ethnicity | Total |
|---|---|
| White 69% | |
| Hispanic 11% | |
| Two or more races 8% | |
| Asian 6% | |
| Black 2% | |
| Unknown 2% | |
| Indian/Alaska Native 1% | |
| International student 1% | |
Economic diversity
| Low-income (Note: The percentage of students who received an income-based federal Pell grant intended for low-income students.) 21% | |
| Affluent (Note: The percentage of students who are a part of the American middle class at the bare minimum.) 79% | |

In the 2024–2025 academic year, 14,651 students were enrolled, of which 86% were in-state Washington residents. Western remains a member of the FirstGen Forward Network to support first-generation college students.

A new recording studio at WWU opened in 2024; students can use it to "record and engineer music and engage in cultural audio projects such as capturing Indigenous languages and oral histories".

Additionally, Bellingham contains more than 80 miles of hiking and biking trails.

As a part of the shared governance model, Associated Students of WWU (ASWWU), the university's student government, provides services to students and acts as a voice of the students to the administration. ASWWU is recognized by the President's Office as a governing body for the university. Elected positions within AS are paid.

The on-campus recreation center includes gym equipment and fitness classes. Associated Students operates an outdoor center, where students can rent bikes, skis, snowboards, kayaks, and camping gear.

== Media ==
Multiple media outlets are associated with WWU.

=== Official publications ===
WWU's Office of University Communications operates several publications, including WWU News, the university's news website; Western Today, a newsletter published thrice weekly; and Window: The Magazine of Western Washington University, a quarterly magazine. It won multiple silver and bronze Council for Advancement and Support of Education Circle of Excellence awards in 2019.

A livestream of Red Square is filmed from atop Bond Hall.

=== Student publications ===
Student-run publications at WWU include:

- The Front (formerly The Western Front) is Western's official student newspaper covering city-wide and greater county-wide news. It operates independently of the university itself, though articles are written, edited, and published by students of the university. The Front was awarded as the "Best All-Around Non-Daily Student Newspaper" by the Society of Professional Journalists' Region 10 in 2017. Its predecessor, the Normal Messenger, was first published in 1899.
- Klipsun is a quarterly multimedia student magazine. Each issue of the magazine has a specific theme.
- Occam's Razor is an academic journal that publishes academic research by Western undergraduates.
- The Planet is an environmental journalism magazine published by students of the university's College of the Environment.

The Student Publications Program publishes The Front, Klipsun, Occam's Razor, and the Planet, as well as the literary magazine Jeopardy. The Associated Students of WWU also operates media services, including Wavelength, a weekly online and printed alternative publication, and the KUGS FM student radio station.

== Police ==
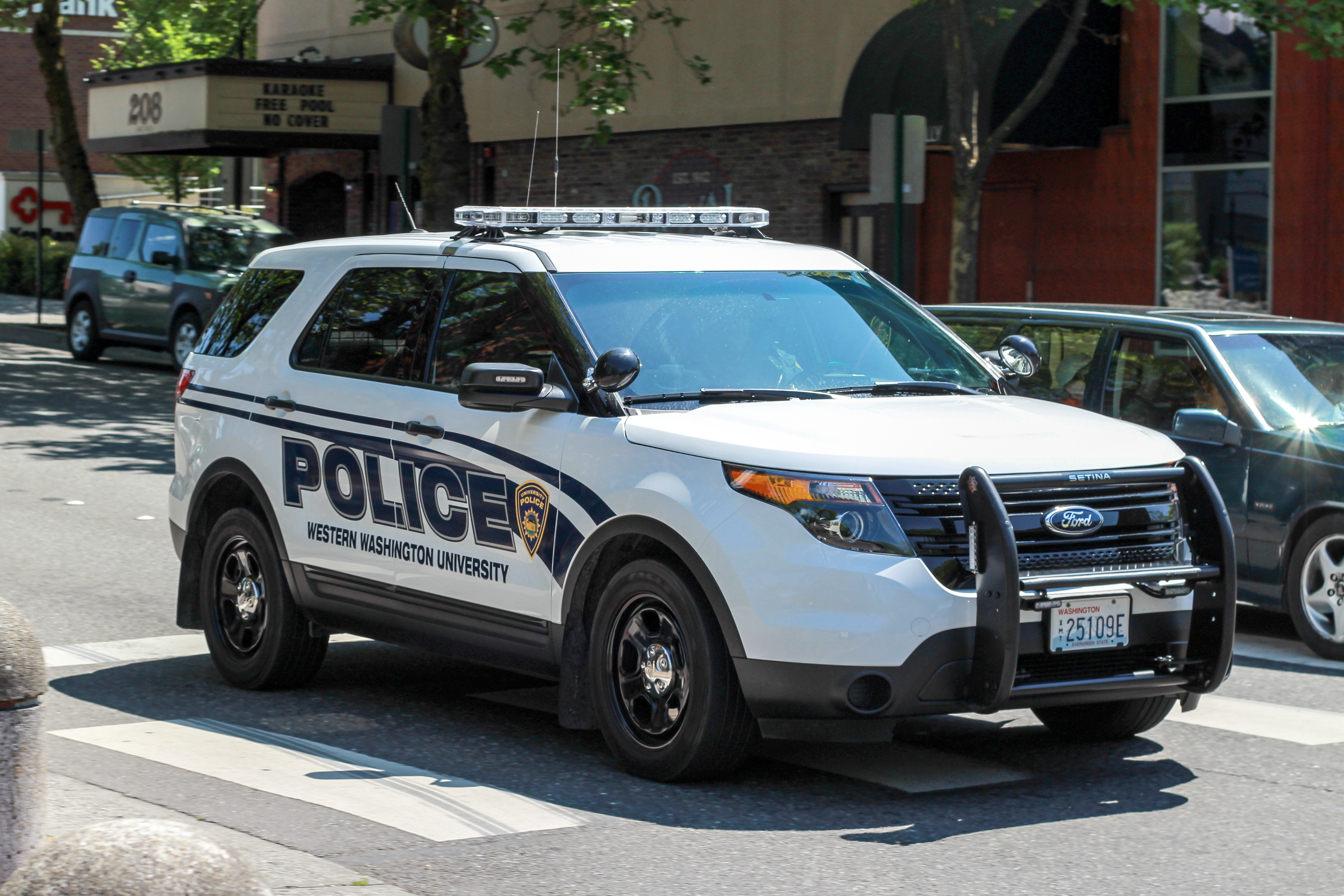
A WWUPD car in downtown Bellingham

The Western Washington University Police Department (abbreviated WWUPD) are the university police force of the university. The police chief of the department is Katryne "Katy" Potts, who was sworn into the position in January 2023. The department also has a staff of "Green Coats" under their public safety branch, who offer "safety escorts on campus, event security staffing and building access services for current students."

== Notable people ==
=== Faculty ===
This is a list of current and former notable tenured faculty members at Western Washington University.

- Jackie Caplan-Auerbach, geology
- Jeff Carroll, psychology
- Frank Deerwester, psychology and education
- Kristin Denham, linguistics
- Craig Dunn, business and sustainability
- Don Easterbrook, geology
- Michael H. Fisher, history
- Gary Geddes, Canadian culture
- Carol Guess, English
- Lourdes Gutiérrez Nájera, ethnic studies
- Marco Hatch, environmental science
- Chuck Israels, music
- Robert I. Jewett, mathematics
- H. Thomas Johnson, accounting
- Anne Lobeck, linguistics
- Lee Maracle, Canadian culture
- Robert Mitchell, geology
- Raquel Montoya-Lewis, interdisciplinary studies
- Catherine T. Montgomery, education
- Johann Neem, history
- George Nelson, physics and astronomy
- Suzanne Paola, English
- Oliver de la Paz, English
- Richard Purtill, philosophy
- Dave Rahm, geology
- Tanis S'eiltin, interdisciplinary studies
- Thaddeus Spratlen, economics
- Christopher Anne Suczek, geology
- Ada Swineford, geology
- Robert M. Thorndike, psychology
- Edward Vajda, linguistics and Russian
- Grace Wang, environmental studies
- Ryan Wasserman, philosophy
- Christopher Wise, English
- Jane Wong, ethnic studies and English

=== Alumni ===
- Robert Angel, creator of Pictionary
- David Arnold, mathematician at Baylor University
- Tori Black, porn actress, AVN Hall of Famer
- Hoby Darling, president of Riot Games
- Ben Dragavon, professional soccer player
- Dan Erickson, screenwriter, creator of Severance
- Michael Farris, founder of Patrick Henry College
- Ben Gibbard, vocalist for Death Cab for Cutie
- Breezy Johnson, skier, Olympic gold medalist
- Kelli Linville, former mayor of Bellingham
- TJ Martin, filmmaker and Academy Award winner
- Douglas Massey, sociologist at Princeton University
- Joseph Mougous, microbiologist at Yale University
- Ralph Munro, former secretary of state of Washington
- Michael E. Phelps, biophysicist at UCLA
- Tilali Scanlan, Olympic swimmer
- Duff Wilson, journalist, two-time Goldsmith Prize winner
- Hiro Yamamoto, bassist for Soundgarden
