= Australian Financial Centre Forum =

The Australian Financial Centre Forum is an Australian government advisory board that works with ASIC and the Treasury to promote the Australian financial sector, which directly employs more than 400,000 people in banking, insurance, foreign exchange, equities, commodities and funds management. The Forum was created in September 2008 by the Rudd Government. It is currently presided over by Mark Johnston, a former deputy chairman of Macquarie Bank.

== Role ==
The Forum is tasked with promoting Australian financial services to foreign fund investors and to "position Australia as a leading financial services centre in the Asia-Pacific region".

The Forum meets with asset and fund managers from around the Asia-Pacific region to attract and streamline business from Asian financial centres, including Singapore, Hong Kong, Shanghai, Seoul and Tokyo. It regularly compiles reports on the performance of the funds management industry, Australia's most valuable financial services industry in terms of exports.

The Forum also reports on corporate taxation and investment overseas by Australian institutions.

== Board members ==
Mark Johnson was appointed head of the board in 2009, a controversial choice which was seen to contradict Prime Minister Kevin Rudd, who has argued the 2008 financial crisis was created by high-risk investment banks. Johnson is a former deputy chairman of Macquarie Bank and has 40 years of experience in financial services.

A number of other bankers are on the board. Other panel members include:

- Paul Binstead
- Patricia Cross
- Craig Dunn
- John Story
- Jeremy Duffield
- Alf Capito
