= Old Main (Western Washington University) =

- Old Main, Western Washington University
- U.S. National Register of Historic Places
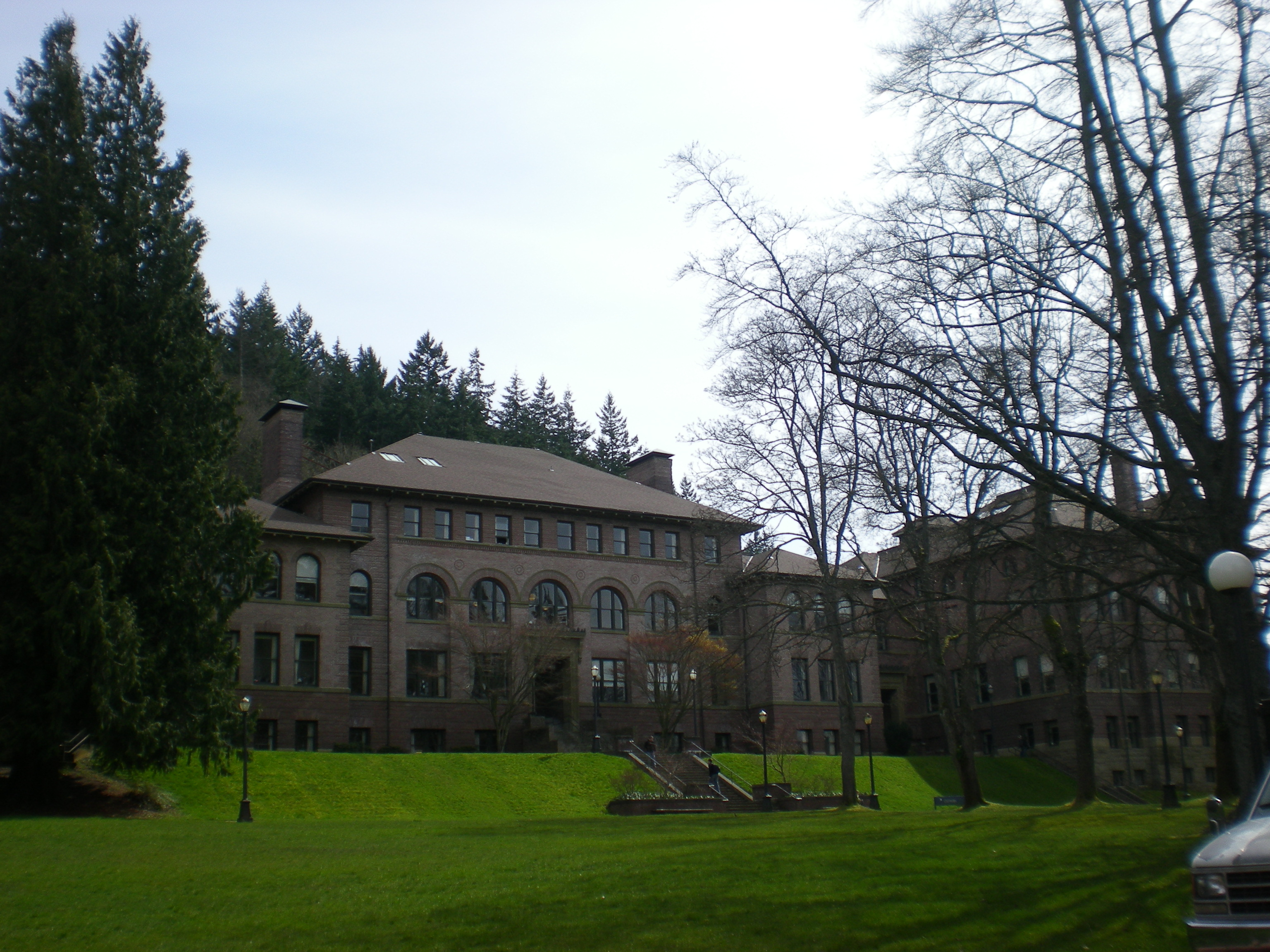

- Location within Washington (state)
- Location: Western Washington University campus, Bellingham, Washington
- Coordinates: 48°44′17″N 122°28′58″W
- Built: 1896, 1907 (additions)
- Architect: Warren Skillings & James M. Corner; Alfred Lee (1907)
- Architectural style: Italian Renaissance
- NRHP reference No.: 77001365
- Added to NRHP: November 7, 1977

Old Main is a historic building on the Western Washington University campus in Bellingham, Washington. Constructed in 1896 to house the new Normal school and opened for classes in 1899, it is the oldest building on the campus. It currently serves as administrative and student services offices.

== History ==
Governor John McGraw signed legislation establishing the New Whatcom Normal School on February 24, 1893, the first normal School in Western Washington. In November 1895, after enough funds were raised, construction began on a permanent school building on the Sehome Hill site by Fairhaven-based contractor W.B. Davey. Prominent Seattle architects Warren Skillings & James Corner were chosen to design the new building, a 4-story brick and stone building in the Italian Renaissance style. The structure was largely completed by February 1897 but could not be opened to students until additional funds could be secured to install heating, lighting, and to do general grounds maintenance, which were not included in the original contract. The first official class entered in 1899, composed of 88 students. Matching 4-story wings were added to the north and south ends of the building in 1907 under the direction of Bellingham architect Alfred Lee, who is best known for having designed the New Whatcom City Hall in 1892, now the Whatcom Museum.
