= Craig Dunn =

American business professor

- Education: California State University, Long Beach, California State University, Bakersfield, and Indiana University
- Occupation: Professor
- Organization: Western Washington University

Craig P. Dunn is an American professor in the fields of business and sustainability. He is a professor in the management department at Western Washington University, where from 2016 to 2023 he served as Wilder Distinguished Professor of Business and Sustainability, an endowed professorship. Dunn attended California State University, Long Beach for his Bachelor of Science degree in business administration, California State University, Bakersfield for his Master of Business Administration, and Indiana University Bloomington for his Doctor of Philosophy. He formerly worked for San Diego State University, where he is now an associate professor, emeritus.

At Western Washington University, he served as dean of the College of Business and Economics from 2013 to 2016 before gaining his professorship. He was succeeded as dean by Scott Young. Dunn also serves on the faculty of the Institute for Energy Studies, on the Graduate Faculty Governance Council, and on the Lesbian, Gay, Bisexual & Transgender Advocacy Council. In 2021, Dunn had the highest salary of any university employee other than the president, Sabah Randhawa.
