= Hollenhorst plaque =

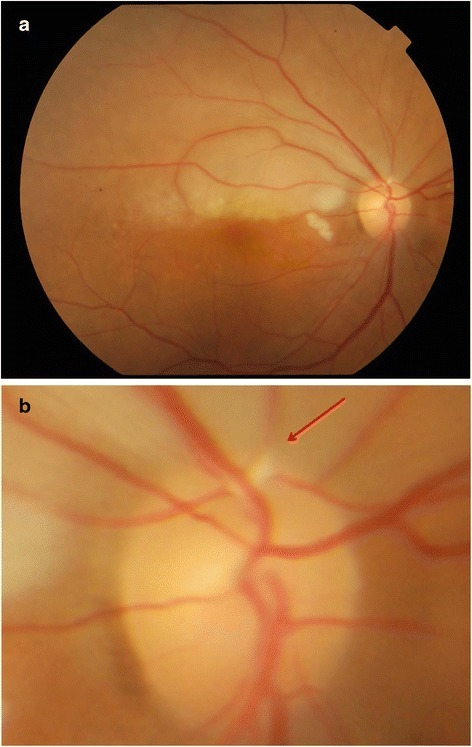
- Right eye findings. a Fundus photo showing superior pale retina. b Presence of Hollenhorst plaque in the superotemporal vessel (arrow)
- Specialty: Cardiovascular

A Hollenhorst plaque (also known as a retinal cholesterol embolus) is a cholesterol embolus that is seen in a blood vessel of the retina. It is usually found when a physician performs ophthalmoscopy, during which a plaque will appear as a small, bright crystal that is refractile (reflects the light from the ophthalmoscope) and yellow. This is a medical exam finding, and is not a medical condition, though it may be related to cardiovascular conditions such as atherosclerosis of the internal carotid artery. It was first described by American ophthalmologist Robert Hollenhorst in 1961.

== Presentation ==
=== Associated conditions ===
Hollenhorst plaques may cause retinal occlusion, where the plaque blocks blood flow through the retinal vessels, resulting in temporary or permanent vision loss in the affected eye. However, while Hollenhorst plaques do become lodged in retinal arteries, they generally do not fully prevent blood flow so do not cause ischemia. Once a Hollenhorst plaque is discovered in a retinal vessel, it may further migrate and lodge elsewhere, break into smaller pieces, or dissolve and disappear entirely.

While Hollenhorst plaques generally do not cause problems with health of the eye, they may be a sign of systemic health issues, particularly of the cardiovascular system. These plaques are more common in men than in women, and are more likely to be present in people who have hypertension, past or current smokers, older patients, and those with history of any vascular disease (including history of transient ischemic attack, stroke, coronary artery disease, and/or peripheral vascular disease). Appearance of retinal plaques is associated with strokes and may be a risk factor for stroke, however because plaques may disappear on their own, discovery of plaques is not predictive of an impending stroke. Risk of death after a stroke may be increased in those who are noted to have Hollenhorst plaques compared to stroke patients who do not. The most common condition associated with appearance of a Hollenhorst plaque is carotid artery disease, including carotid artery stenosis (narrowing of the space inside the vessel).

== Cause ==
A Hollenhorst plaque is the result of embolization (breaking off) of cholesterol forming an atheromatous plaque. This occurs in a blood vessel that is upstream of the eye, such as the internal carotid artery on the same side as the eye (ipsilateral), or the aorta. This cholesterol embolus is then able to travel via the bloodstream to distal (downstream) vessels. When it reaches the tiny blood vessels in the retina of the eye, the plaque may become lodged, where it is visible on eye exam by a physician as a bright crystal (the Hollenhorst plaque). The plaques most commonly lodge at vessel bifurcations, meaning areas where the blood vessel branches into two or more smaller vessels.

== Management ==
=== Standard workup and recommendations ===
Hollenhorst plaques still require more research, and because of this, there is a wide range of testing that a physician may or may not choose to complete. While there are many possible options, the American Academy of Ophthalmology recommends the following steps be taken when an asymptomatic plaque is first noted.

- Referral to a primary care provider. There is no evidence that any further testing from an optometrist or ophthalmologist is needed. Further testing should be completed by primary care physician in conjunction with the relevant specialist(s) (may include optometry/ophthalmology, cardiology, neurology depending on past medical history of the individual patient).
- Doppler ultrasound of the carotid artery. This test is often ordered to look for any disease or narrowing of the carotid artery. It is safe and non-invasive, and if disease is found, can allow the patient to pursue further treatment to prevent future stroke. However, this imaging may miss presence of disease in the carotid, or in the vessels above or below that are not seen on this testing. For this reason, a negative carotid artery Doppler ultrasound cannot rule out the possibility of atherosclerotic disease. This is why, despite being one of the most commonly ordered tests after recognition of a Hollenhorst plaque, there is controversy in the medical community on whether or not this test should be routinely ordered.
  - The most recent (2011) practice guidelines for the Society of Vascular Surgery strongly recommend carotid Doppler ultrasounds as part of the workup for Hollenhorst plaque.
- Smoking cessation. If patient is a current smoker, smoking cessation is universally recommended for patients with a Hollenhorst plaque.
- Finally, patients should be counseled on the possible signs and symptoms of a stroke. If patients think they may be experiencing ANY of the signs of a stroke, they should be instructed to immediately go to the nearest Emergency Department. As Hollenhorst plaques can be associated with stroke, knowing what to do if one occurs is very important.

=== Other testing and management options ===
While there is disagreement among medical professionals on what testing is considered necessary, several forms of testing are not shown to be effective in evaluating patients for cardiovascular disease after a retinal cholesterol embolus is found. This recommendation is for patients who do not have any symptoms or concerning past medical history, and testing is ultimately decided by the physician on a case-by-case basis for the individual patient. These include:

- Daily aspirin. While this is commonly used for prevention of cardiovascular events in high-risk patients, there is currently no evidence to support use of daily aspirin in patients with an asymptomatic Hollenhorst plaque.
- Referral for echocardiogram. This is a test commonly performed; however, much like the carotid Doppler ultrasound, a negative test does not rule out the heart as a potential source of the retinal embolus. This is not part of the standard workup due to the limited research available, but may be ordered for certain patients at the discretion of the primary care physician.
- Kidney function testing. While Hollenhorst plaques have shown a possible association with chronic kidney disease, testing for kidney function is not routinely recommended. This is because the presentation of kidney disease is often severe and sudden. While patients should be screened for concerning symptoms (new uncontrolled hypertension, skin lesions, gastrointestinal symptoms, fever, weight loss, malaise), it is unlikely that a patient without symptoms would have kidney disease. For this reason testing is not standard in asymptomatic patients.
- Carotid Auscultation. When physicians listen via a stethoscope placed on the neck, they may hear a bruit, which indicates turbulent flow through a blood vessel. While this may be useful in detecting unknown carotid disease, it is not accurate enough to rule out disease. It is estimated that 44% of patients who do not have a bruit on auscultation will still have significant stenosis of the carotid artery.
- Carotid endarterectomy. This is a surgical procedure that is used to restore blood flow in a stenosed carotid artery. At this time, it is not recommended that patients with an asymptomatic Hollenhorst plaque have this procedure, as it does not change the risk of stroke.

== History ==
The phenomenon is named after the American ophthalmologist Robert Hollenhorst.

The first recorded description of "bright" retinal emboli was made in 1927 by TH Butler. While other retinal emboli had been described, the bright nature of these differentiated them from prior descriptions.

Hollenhorst further described finding bright plaques in 1958, at the same time they were independently described by German researchers R. Witmer and A. Schmid via a case study. They further hypothesized that these plaques were composed of cholesterol. However, it was Hollenhorst who went on to establish the link between these bright emboli and cerebrovascular disease. He further discovered the relationship between presence of these plaques, and increased mortality from cardiovascular disease. In his study of patients with carotid artery disease, he noticed that the plaques occurred on the same side as the affected artery. In 1960 he expanded his research, and noted that the plaques could be made to move by applying pressure to the eye. Additionally, he found that the plaques often occurred after a patient had had carotid artery surgery.

In 1961, Hollenhorst published "Significance of Bright Plaques in Retinal Arterioles" in The Journal of the American Medical Association and described his findings. Besides the previously discussed points, he described that the plaques were able to break into smaller fragments, and generally did not completely block retinal arteries. He also reported an experiment conducted with a neurologist named Jack Whisnant, that verified the idea that the plaques were composed of cholesterol. To do this, they took cholesterol crystals and material from atheromatous plaques in humans, and injected them into the carotids of dogs and Macaca rhesus monkeys. They found development of similar retinal plaques in these animals. In 1963, the cholesterol composition was confirmed by researchers via autopsy of a patient who died during carotid surgery.

Hollenhorst continued to study these plaques, detailing associations with their appearance and cerebral ischemic events. He also noted that survival these patients was decreased compared to those without plaques.

Work continued on this topic, and studies include the 1997 Blue Mountain Eye Study conducted in Australia and the Beaver Dam Eye Study in Wisconsin, of which patients have been followed up for the past 15 years. In 2005, one study looked at data from both the Atherosclerosis Risk in Communities (ARIC) study, and the Cardiovascular Health Study (CHS) and suggested evaluation composed of cardiovascular workup and smoking cessation. Other work continued to build on this and includes 2008 the Los Angeles Latino Eyes Study (LAKES) study, and the 2017 Singapore Epidemiology of Eye Disease Study (SEEDS).
