= History of the University of Texas at Arlington (1895–1917) =

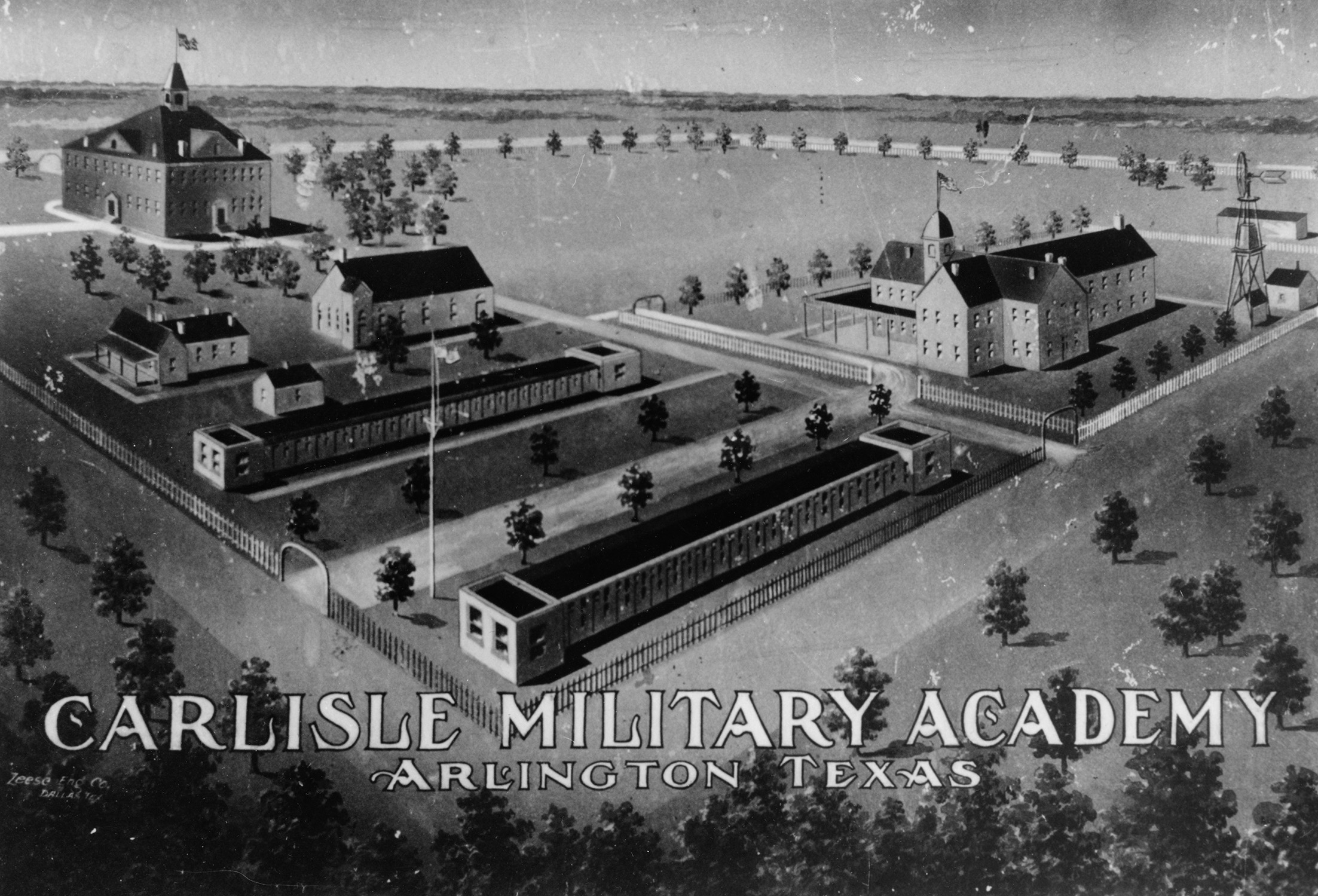
Poster displaying an aerial view of Carlisle Military Academy

The history of the University of Texas at Arlington began with the foundation of Arlington College in 1895, which was the first of a series of private schools to exist on the site of the present university. It consisted of first through tenth grades and enrolled between 75 and 150 students on a campus that consisted initially of only a two-story schoolhouse. It was created largely due to the underfunded and generally inadequate public schools in the city. Arlington College closed in July 1902, after Arlington voters passed a proposition to create an independent school district.

Carlisle Military Academy was established on the same site by Colonel James M. Carlisle in 1902. Although nominally a school for boys, it also accepted a handful of female students. Its enrollment grew from 48 students in 1902 to 150 students by 1905. Pupils were between the ages of 10 and 18. The school was molded by Carlisle's educational philosophy, which balanced intellectualism with military training to instill discipline in students and prepare them for enrollment in elite colleges. In 1907, United States Army lieutenant Harry King visited the school and became convinced it was one of the best institutions of its kind in the country. Carlisle's financial problems resulted in the school entering receivership in 1911, and in 1913 the school closed.

Later in 1913, Arlington Training School was founded by H. K. Taylor. Like its immediate predecessor, it focused on offering a preparatory military school education for male students, although it also accepted female students. Its enrollment grew from 32 students on its opening day to 93 students in its final academic year, 1915–16. Graduates of its secondary unit met the University of Texas at Austin's entrance requirements. The school was beset by financial troubles and lawsuits in the spring of 1916. Taylor left Arlington after the end of the 1915–16 academic year and Arlington Training School closed.

In 1916, Arlington Military Academy was founded by John B. Dodson, and it lasted for only one academic year. It would be the last attempt by the citizens of Arlington to support a private intermediate and secondary school. Like its predecessors, the school attempted to balance intellectualism with military exercises, instill discipline into its students, and prepare them for attending a university or a career in business. However, its enrollment figures were disappointing, resulting in little community support for the school. In January 1917, Arlington leaders met to organize an effort to convince the Texas Legislature to grant the community a junior college in place of a military academy. Despite their failures, between 1895 and 1917 these four private schools collectively educated hundreds of children in Arlington.

== Arlington College (1895–1902) ==
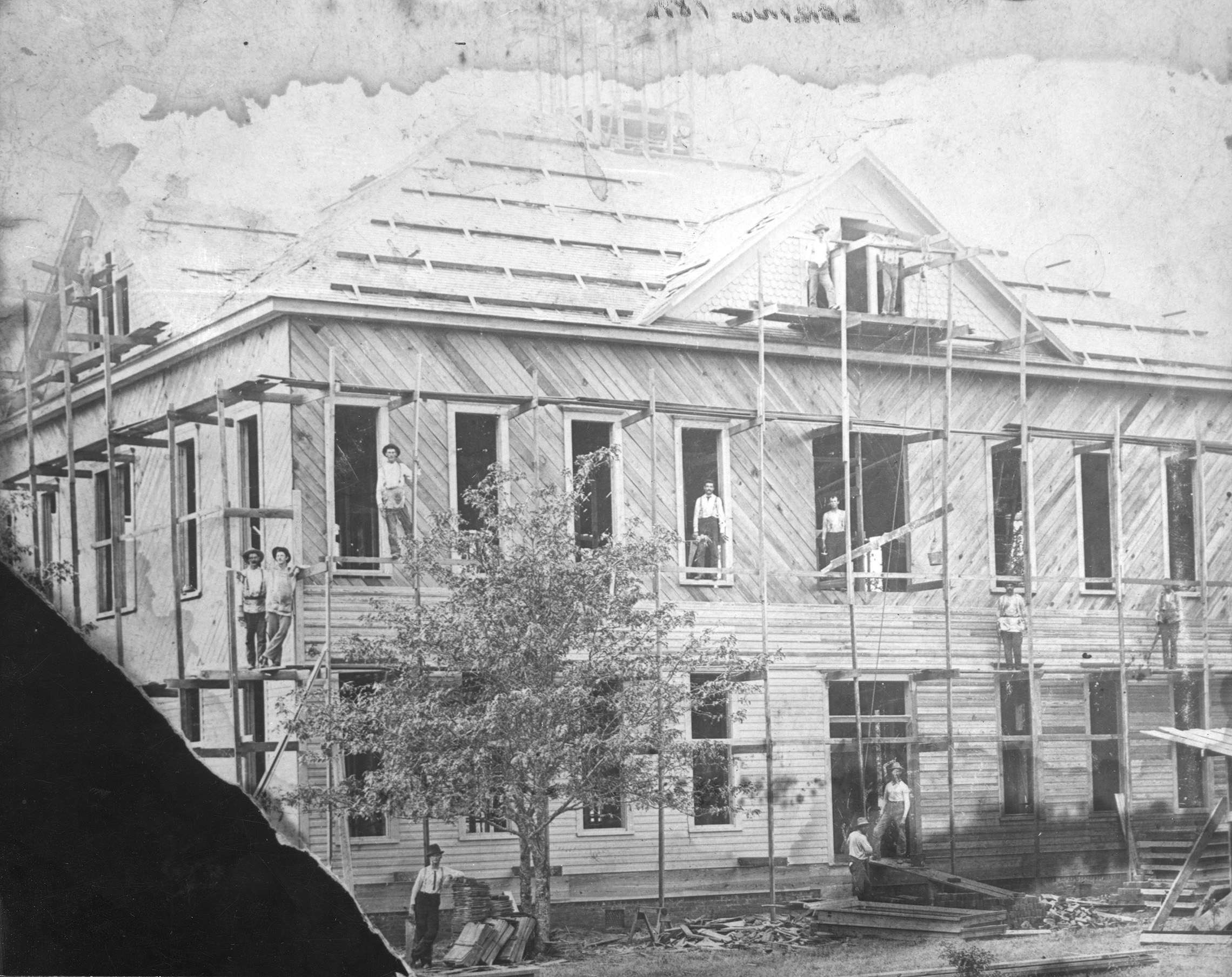
The first building on the campus of Arlington College under construction

Arlington College was founded in September 1895 by Lee M. Hammond and William M. Trimble. At the time, Arlington was a small rural North Texas town with a population of about 1,000 people. Its public schools were underfunded and generally inadequate, an important problem given the median age in Arlington was 20 and a third of its residents were under age 10. Arlington College was the first of a series of private schools to exist on the site of the present University of Texas at Arlington (UTA). From the beginning it was championed by civic booster Emmett Rankin, a native of Tennessee who moved to Arlington in 1874 and established the Rankin Hardware Company. He hoped to raise the standard of education in the then-rural town. A private school, Arlington College consisted of first through tenth grades.

The school charged tuition that ranged between $1.50 and $3.50 per month per student. It had a faculty of six teachers and taught subjects ranging from algebra, grammar, and Latin to art, elocution, and penmanship. In 1895–96, the school's inaugural year, it had about 75 students, which grew to approximately 120 in 1896–97 and 150 in 1897–98. It held its first commencement in May 1898, which graduated only two students at the high school level. In May 1900, four students graduated.

Arlington College's original wood-frame schoolhouse stood near the location of the University Center on the UTA campus today, on land donated by James Ditto and A. W. Collins that was at the time one mile (1.6 km) southwest of Arlington. Built at a cost of $5,000, the two-story schoolhouse lacked indoor plumbing but contained six classrooms and an assembly room. Rankin convinced Lee Morgan Hammond and William M. Trimble, the two co-principals of the Arlington Public School, to start Arlington College and invest $500 each in it. Hammond had been born in Alabama in 1869 and Trimble had been born in Tarrant County, Texas, in 1868. Both were educated at Bedford College and Sam Houston Normal Institute before they arrived in Arlington to become co-principals of the Arlington Public School in 1894.

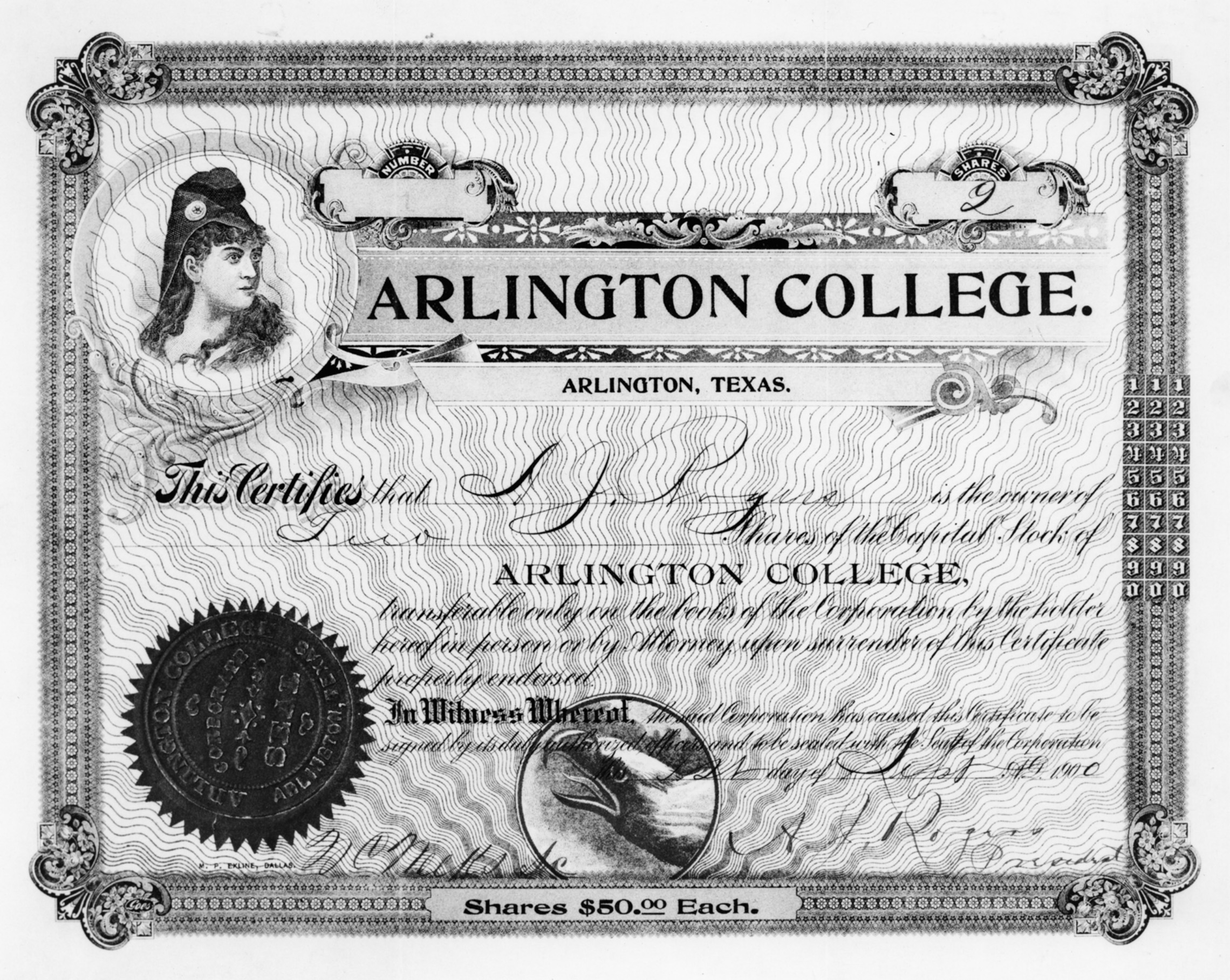
Arlington College stock certificate, 1900

During the 1896–97 academic year, Arlington College agreed to provide places for public school students for a duration of five months in exchange for receiving two-thirds of Arlington's public education funding, an agreement that lasted until 1900. Perhaps because of the unsatisfactory nature of this agreement, Trimble sold his interest in Arlington College in 1898 and Hammond did likewise in 1900. That year, the Arlington College Corporation was established to run the school, with newly appointed president W. W. Franklin of Dallas. The new corporation and its trustees sold stock in an effort to prevent the closure of the school. In July 1900, Arlington College filed a charter for $4,000 in capital stock. In 1901, its faculty consisted of four teachers. In the summer of that year, the school's trustees declared Arlington College's building to be "unsafe and wholly unfit" before a proposition to transfer the school's administration from the trustees to the city was defeated by Arlington voters.

In August 1901, the college and the city came to an agreement by which the public school would rent the Arlington College building for $350, while the college retained just one room and one teacher. Throughout the 1901–02 academic year, the local newspaper, The Arlington Journal, pressured for school reform and the creation of an independent school district that would have the means to construct a new brick building. In April 1902, Arlington voters passed a proposition to create an independent school district by a margin of three-to-one, while later that spring they also approved a $12,000 bond issue to fund school construction. The school district officially became the Arlington Independent School District with legislative validation a year later. Arlington College officially closed on July 3, 1902, when the corporation deeded its property. At the same time, it was announced that James M. Carlisle had agreed to establish a military academy on the grounds of the college in fall 1902.

Also in 1902, Arlington Journal editor William A. Bowen began a campaign to create a junior college in Arlington as a branch campus of Texas A&M College. He continued this effort for 15 years until such a college was established in the city. Bowen's ideas were supported by editorials in the Dallas Times Herald, the Fort Worth Star-Telegram, and the Houston Post. While some called for a simple expansion of the campus in College Station to accommodate A&M's growth, ultimately branch campuses around Texas were established in addition to an enlarged College Station campus.

== Military training schools (1902–1917) ==
=== Carlisle Military Academy (1902–1913) ===
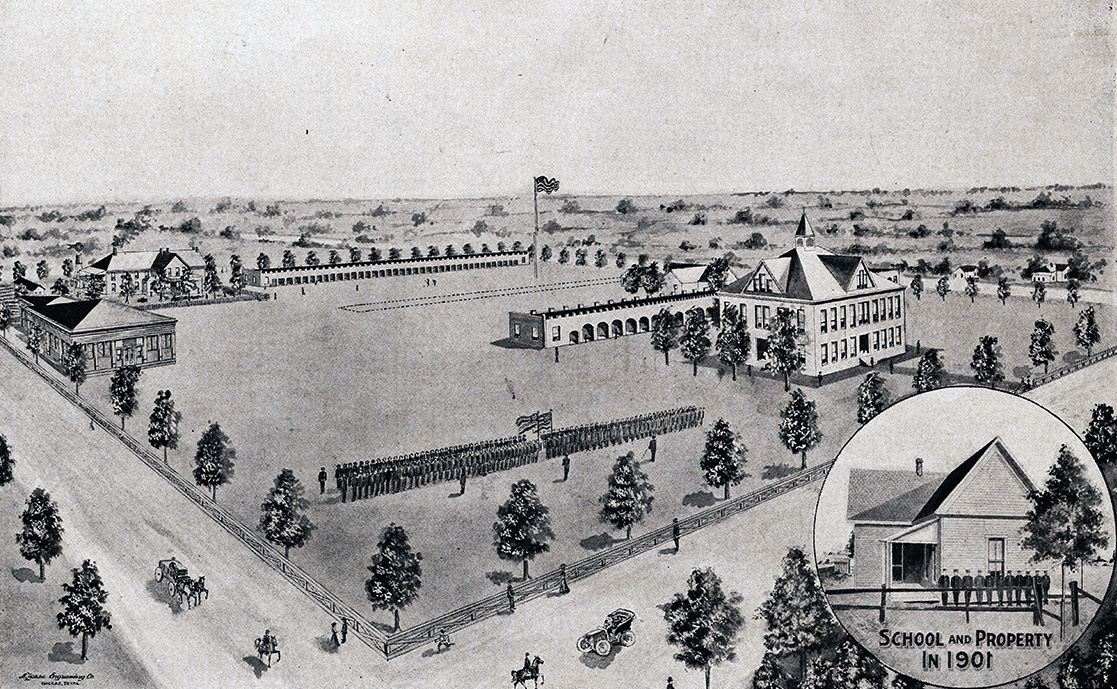
Drawing of the Carlisle Military Academy campus in 1901

Carlisle Military Academy was established by Colonel James M. Carlisle in September 1902. Carlisle was born in Coffee County, Tennessee, and was educated at Beech Grove College in Tennessee; Emory College in Oxford, Georgia; and the University of Nashville. When he arrived in Arlington in 1902, he had a reputation as a prominent educator. By that point, he had already served as state superintendent of public instruction, the president of the Texas State Teachers Association, the superintendent of public schools in three different cities (Corsicana, Fort Worth, and Whitesboro), and had founded private schools in both Hillsboro and Whitesboro. Before he opened a new school in Arlington, Carlisle received a tentative deed for the school's land and a promise by the town's citizens to build a dormitory on that land.

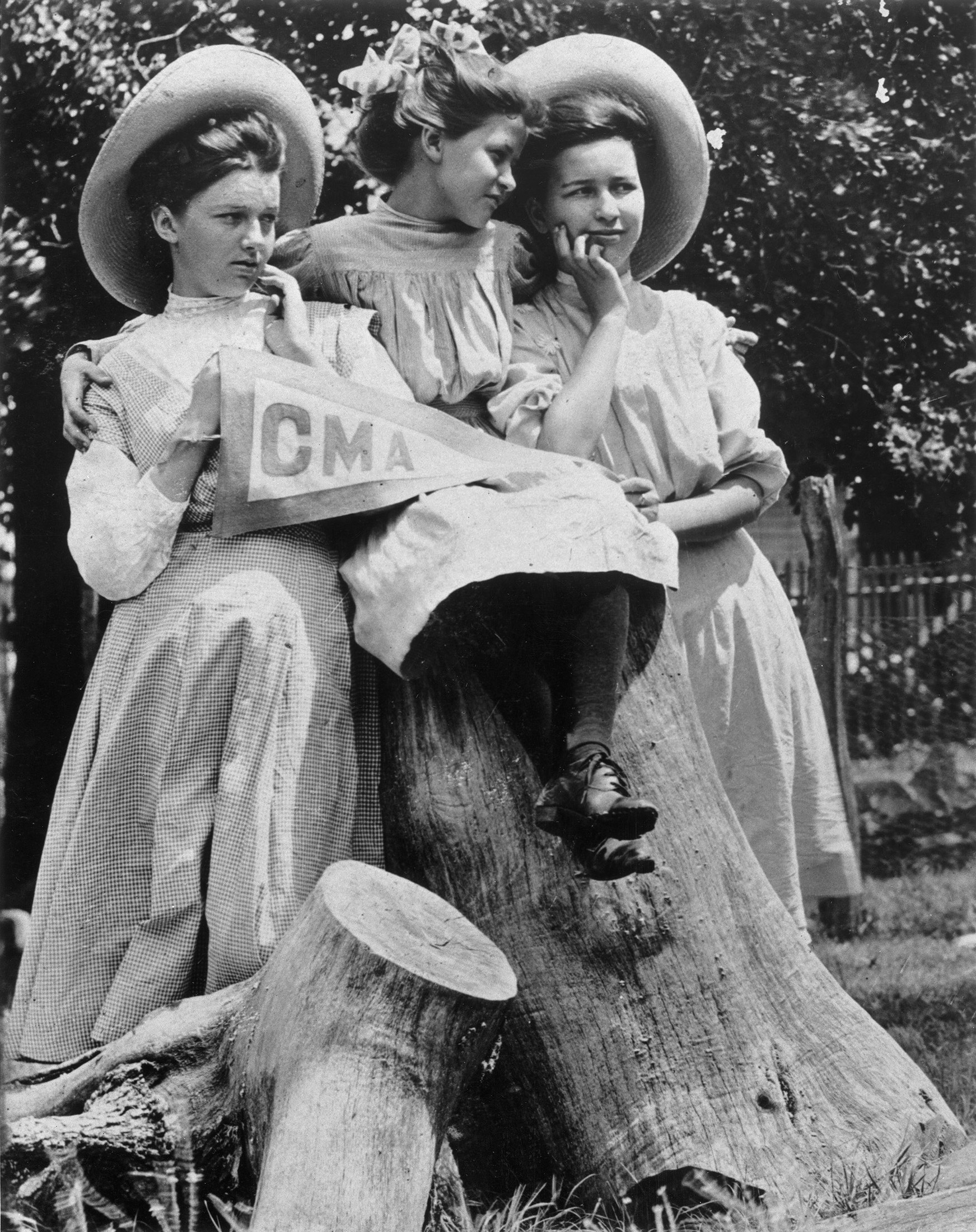
Carlisle Military Academy students Jessie (Bardin) Wardell, Ethel (Roy) Brown, and Eunice Taylor in 1910

Carlisle's new school, a private military academy, opened on September 16, 1902. It was initially known as Carlisle's School for Boys despite the fact that it accepted girls as well. After being incorporated in fall 1903 as Carlisle Military Academy, it secured a charter from the State of Texas that declaring it to be "for the literary, military, and manual training of boys". However, the charter also expressly allowed Carlisle to enroll "a limited number of girls". The dormitory promised by Arlingtonians was known officially as Arlington Hall but commonly as the South Barracks. It housed 30 students, a dining hall, and the superintendent's residence on a site where UTA's Preston Hall would later be built. Carlisle himself served as the school's superintendent, while his wife Julia, his daughter Mary, and Rev. W. B. Fitzhugh served as its three directors. Both Julia and Mary Carlisle also taught classes. The school maintained at least four full-time teachers on staff throughout its history, although most individual teachers left the school after only a year or two on staff.

On opening day in September 1902, 48 students were enrolled in Carlisle Military Academy, and by the end of the academic year in May 1903, that number had grown to 71. Nearly two thirds of students were local, either living at home or with relatives in Arlington while they attended the school. Most of the other students were from Central Texas and North Texas. In the spring of 1904, the school had 97 students, and in spring 1905, it had 150. The school graduated two students at its first commencement ceremony in May 1904, its lowest-ever number of graduates. Its highest number of graduates was 11, in 1909. In September 1905, due in part to the school's struggles to handle increases in enrollment, it stopped accepting female students and reduced its advertising. As a result, two former teachers, Mary Carlisle and Maggie Smith, established a separate Carlisle-Smith School for Girls in 1904. This school taught girls in first through tenth grades in Arlington, although it only lasted for two years.

Carlisle Military Academy was guided by Carlisle's educational philosophy, which balanced intellectualism with military training to instill discipline in students and prepare them for enrollment in elite colleges. The school accepted students between the ages of 10 and 18, and had grades that were roughly equivalent to fifth through tenth grades. The first two years of study were considered preparatory, and the latter four years roughly equivalent to high school. The curriculum was composed of both required courses such as English, geography, and mathematics as well as electives such as Latin, modern languages, and shorthand. Classes in military science were also offered, while military drill for all male students occurred on a daily basis. Students were additionally required to wear their cadet uniforms at all times. Tuition at Carlisle Military Academy was initially $245, but later increased to $300, while uniforms cost $30.05. An application fee of $25 was instituted in fall 1906. Carlisle required parents to give the school "complete authority" over their children while they attended, while also prohibiting tobacco and advertising Arlington as a "Christian community" without saloons.

With growth in enrollment at Carlisle Military Academy came the acquisition of more land and construction of more buildings. This started with the East Barracks in fall 1904, which had 16 rooms that each boasted electric lighting and indoor plumbing. By summer 1905, all of the school's buildings featured indoor plumbing. By 1906, the school had expanded to four blocks in size, and by 1911 it had constructed an athletics track, additional barracks, a gymnasium, and an indoor swimming pool. The campus eventually spanned 10 acres (4.0 ha).

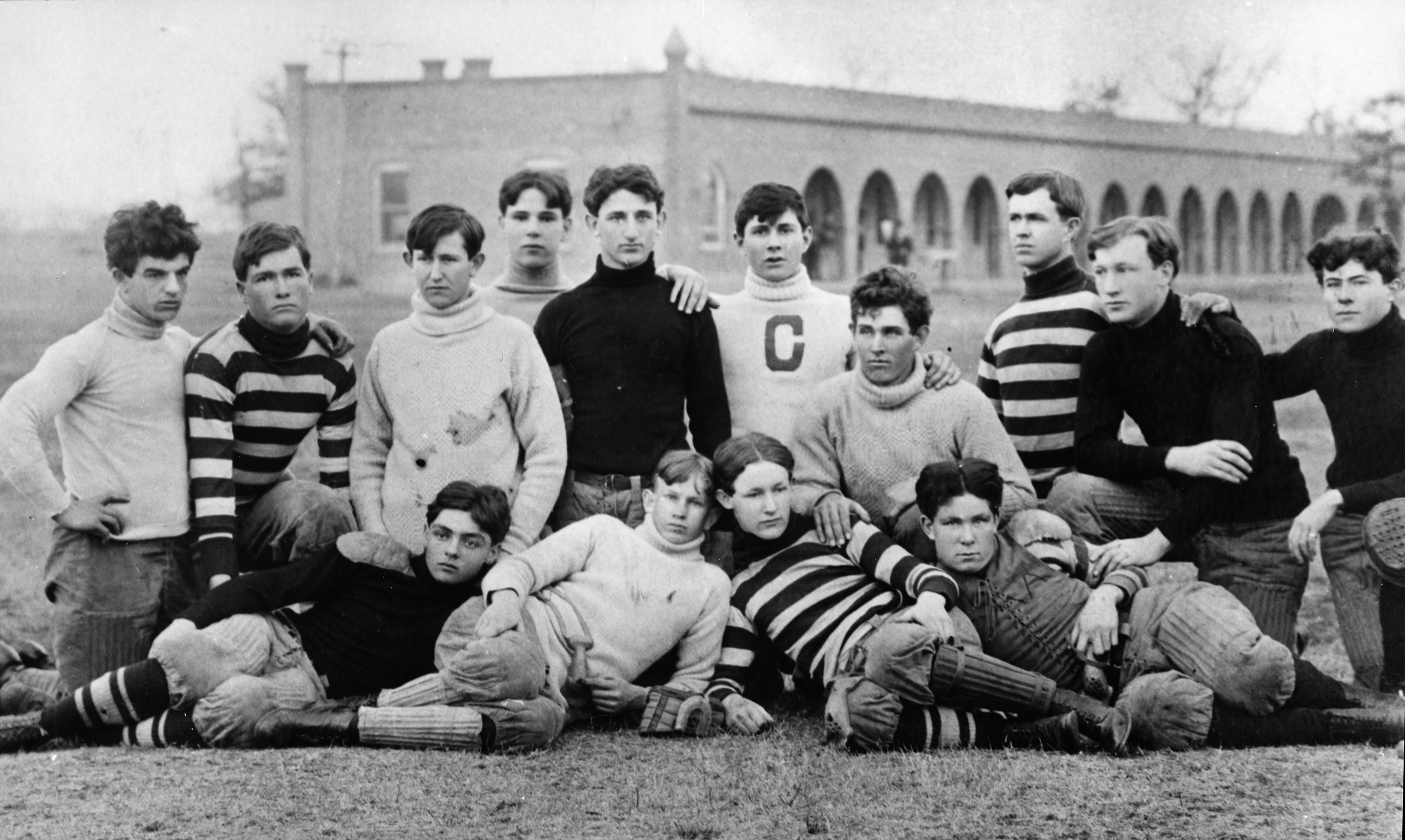
Carlisle Military Academy's first football team, circa 1906–1907

Carlisle Military Academy offered a wide variety of extracurricular activities for its students. It sponsored lectures, plays, music recitals, band concerts, and socials, all of which were open to the Arlington community. It also organized military units that participated in drills, parades, and even mock battles. Between 1904 and 1908, it began fielding athletics teams that played baseball, basketball, football, and track, which brought particular acclaim to the school. The football program was suspended in 1908 after the parents of four starting players removed their sons from the team for fear of injury, leaving the squad with too few players to contest games. Furthermore, the football and baseball coach was, along with six students, arrested for fighting in January 1909. The school also had a cadet band, which was directed by Captain H. E. Alden, who had previously conducted military and civil bands in New York and Ohio.

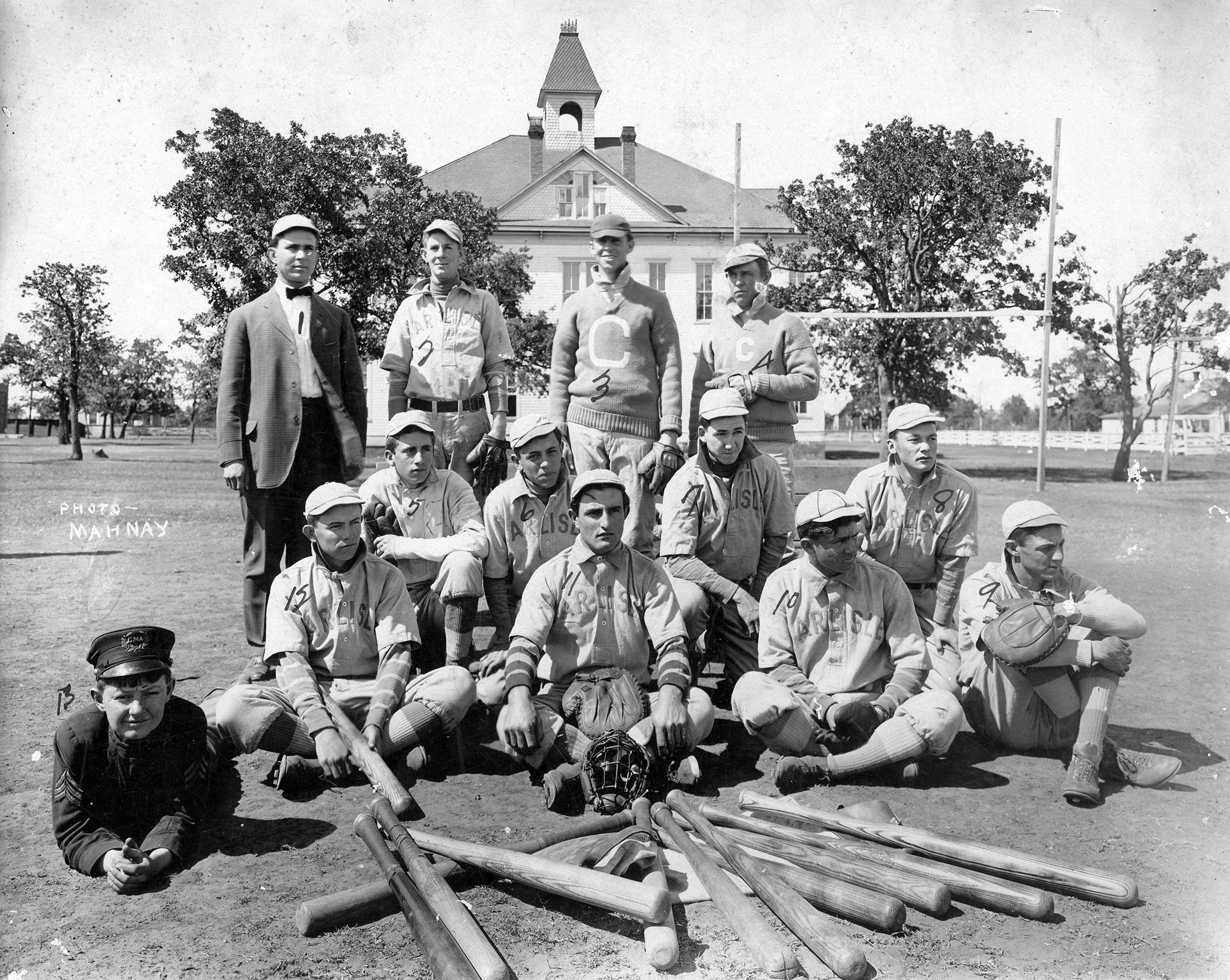
Carlisle Military Academy baseball team, 1910–1911

Carlisle attempted to align the school more strongly with other military academies. In March 1907, United States Army lieutenant Harry King visited the school and became convinced that Carlisle Military Academy was one of the best institutions of its kind in the country. In summer 1907, after inspecting the school, the United States Department of War assigned an active-duty officer, lieutenant Kelton L. Pepper, to the academy. He served as an instructor of military science and made the school only the second military academy in the Southwestern United States to have an active-duty officer on its staff. In 1908, the school was one of only three military academies operating in Texas, with the other two both located in San Antonio.

Carlisle Military Academy began to encounter serious problems in October 1905, when a fire destroyed a barracks that was uninsured. In fall 1908, enrollment fell to 88, the least since its first year, due in part to the Panic of 1907 as well as a local drought. In an effort to raise revenue, Carlisle again allowed female students to enroll in 1908 and converted the academy's real estate (four city blocks in all) to capital stock. Despite these efforts to raise revenue, Carlisle realized that the only effective long-term solution would be to increase enrollment. In May 1911, after rumors that Carlisle was considering leaving town to create a new school elsewhere, his financial problems resulted in the school entering receivership. During receivership, General R. H. Beckham, who was appointed the receiver by the county's district court, settled suits with the school's creditors after Carlisle was unable to meet his obligations to them. Beckham also managed the school's affairs, ensured all its buildings had fire insurance, compiled lists of all its property and liabilities, and continued to employ teachers and staff while, so long as possible, paying them with cash on hand.

In October 1911, the school's lienholders filed suit against Carlisle Military Academy. Many of them had been on the school's advisory board since 1907 and made the decision to force it to sell its property after becoming convinced the school could not operate efficiently. They were concerned that the land would be sold and developed for purposes other than education. After operating for two more years, in August 1913 Carlisle Military Academy was ordered by the court to sell its property to satisfy its obligations with the bank and its lienholders. At this point, the school's debt to its mortgage holders was in excess of $20,000. When bank officer Thomas Spruance purchased its land for $15,610 in a public sale, the school was ordered to pay off as much of the deficit as possible by selling its other property. The court also ordered the school to pay its other debts as well as court costs, and ruled that the Carlisle Military Academy Corporation be dissolved and its "worthless" records be destroyed.

According to historian Gerald Saxon, Carlisle was "a popular and capable educator, but a flawed administrator". Authors Evelyn Barker and Lea Worcester similarly described him as "an excellent educator but a terrible financial manager". Suffering from inefficient management, the school was hurt by its increasing debts, declining enrollments, and overly optimistic plans for expansion. In 1913, Carlisle left Arlington "a humbled and dejected man". He moved to Whitewright to open a new school with his wife, albeit it only lasted for a year. While he was ultimately unable to maintain the school in Arlington, Carlisle did significantly improve its buildings, curriculum, and reputation, which resulted in high hopes for its successor institutions. Carlisle Military Academy had been well regarded in North Texas, and The Whitewright Sun described it as noted for its "development of boys into strong men".

=== Arlington Training School (1913–1916) ===
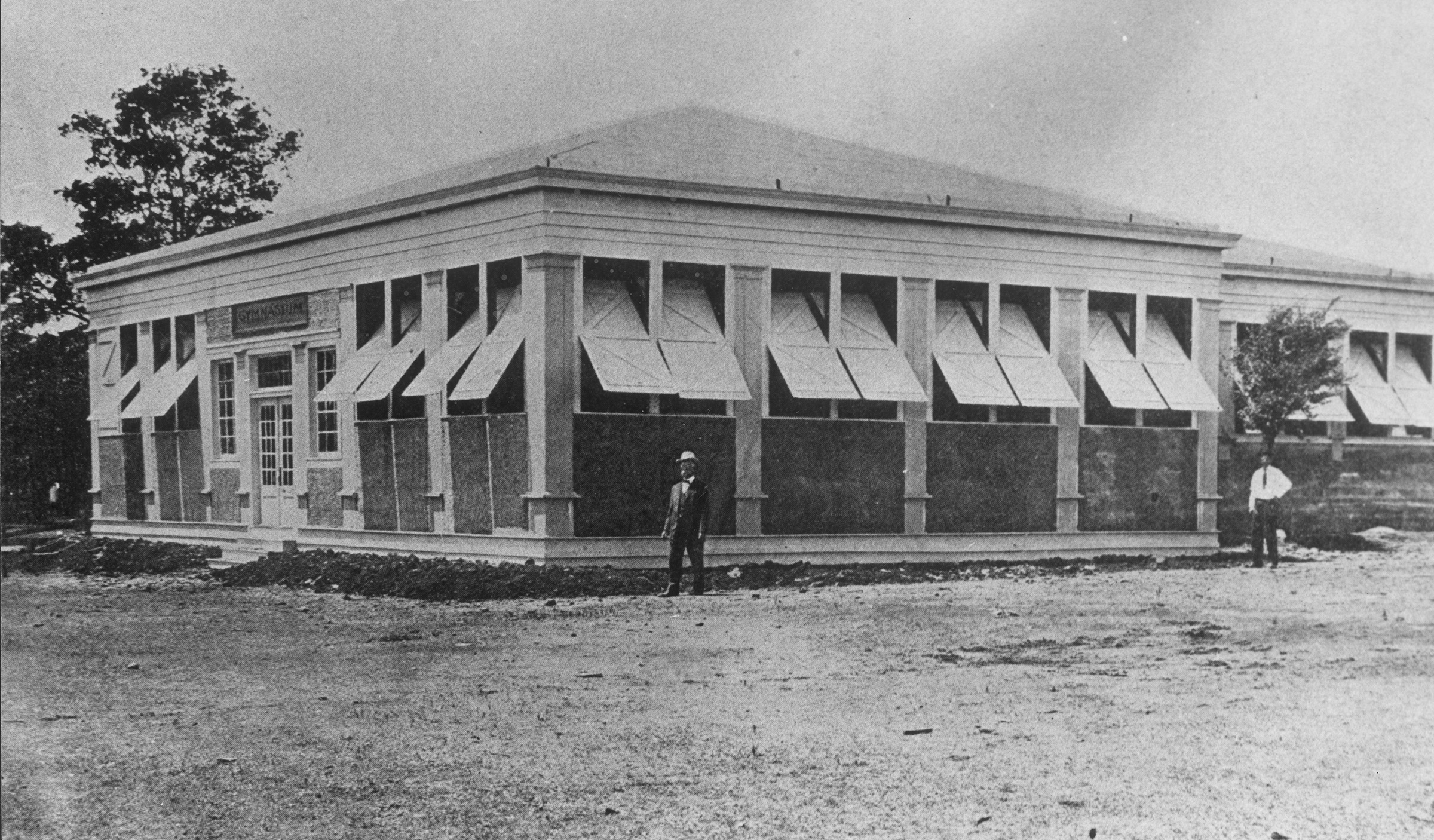
Gymnasium and pool on the Arlington Training School campus, 1913

Arlington Training School was founded by Henry Kirby Taylor in September 1913. Like its immediate predecessor, it focused on offering a preparatory military school education for male students. Taylor was born in Vanceburg, Kentucky, was educated at Kentucky Wesleyan College, and served as president or superintendent of multiple schools in Kentucky between 1883 and 1909. He served as president of Northwest State Teachers College in Maryville, Missouri, from 1909 to 1913, where he earned a reputation as a capable administrator. He left Missouri for Arlington in 1913. Taylor's son-in-law, J. J. Godbey, had served as the headmaster of Carlisle Military Academy from 1911 to 1913, and he helped convince Taylor to move to Arlington and start a new military academy in the town. After arriving in Texas, Taylor reached an agreement with Carlisle Military Academy's property owners in which he promised to improve and insure the campus's buildings, organize an advertising campaign, and employ a competent staff in exchange for being allowed to keep any profits generated and having the opportunity to purchase the school and its land outright for $18,000.

Arlington Training School opened on the former site of Carlisle Military Academy on September 10, 1913. Due in part to a local drought, only 32 students were enrolled at its opening. On opening day, it also had a staff of seven, most of whom were relatives of Taylor, including his wife, two daughters, and two sons-in-law. By the end of the 1913–14 academic year, enrollment had risen to 66 students. In 1914–15, 95 students attended the school, while during the 1915–16 school year, there were 93 students. In spring 1914, the school graduated three students at its first commencement ceremony. In May 1915, 10 students graduated.

Like its immediate predecessor, Arlington Training School admitted girls as day students. It offered both academic courses and additional music classes for its female students. The school billed itself as offering military-style education with "thorough and practical courses". Conceiving itself as a place for "gentlemen's sons" and not a reformatory for "vicious boys", again similar in this regard to its predecessor, Arlington Training School emphasized developing students to be hardworking, polite, and respectful. It also required them to attend church services and Sunday school and spend an hour writing to their families on Sundays. Taylor also advertised Arlington as having "no saloons or other immoral influences".

Arlington Training School was organized into two separate units: an intermediate unit consisting of grades four through six, and a secondary unit with grades seven through ten. To graduate, a student had to complete seventeen "units of work" at the secondary level, which met the University of Texas at Austin's entrance requirements. At the secondary level, the school offered a comprehensive curriculum with courses in mathematics, history, the sciences, English, and foreign languages, as well as vocational subjects such as agriculture, bookkeeping, and business law. Band and physical education were also offered. In 1913–14, board and tuition for students under 14 was $250, and for students over 14 it was $300. Children of ministers received a 15% discount on tuition.

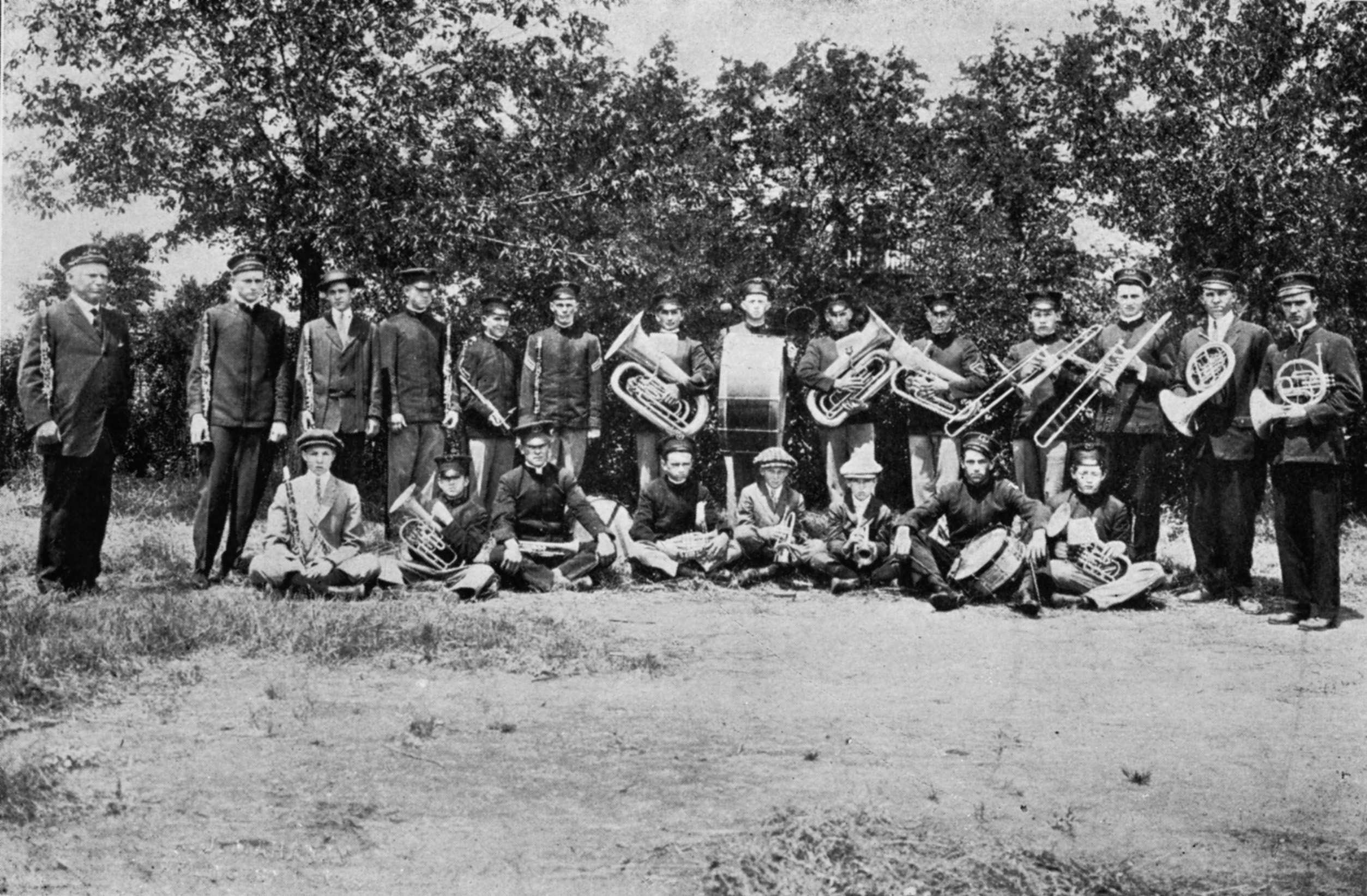
Arlington Training School band, 1913

Taylor organized a number of extracurricular activities for students during the 1913–14 school year, including a band, a school newspaper, and numerous athletics teams: baseball, basketball, football, and track for boys, and basketball for girls. During the 1914–15 school year, forensic clubs, literary societies, and musical groups were added to the offerings, as was tennis, which was offered for both boys and girls.

During the 1913–14 school year, Taylor held meetings with the community to address the school's financial health, which resulted in the sale of 60 scholarships to town residents, the organization of a "Busy Men's Forum" by meeting attendees, and the creation of a board of advisors. Encouraged by this support, Taylor made plans to hire new faculty members and improve the school's buildings and grounds for the next year. Aside from the construction of a grandstand, none of these planned improvements were made during the 1914–15 academic year. The Arlington Journal reported that this failure was a result of the "difference of opinion regarding the value of the property" between Taylor and the advisory board, which was only the first disagreement between the two.

At the time, the disagreement appeared to be minor and short-lived. Taylor, in a letter to the local newspaper, revealed his further plans to improve the campus's buildings and even transform the school into a junior college that would offer courses in agriculture, home economics, and manual training, as well as host an experimental farm and demonstration service. The plan was supported by the director of the Texas A&M College extension department, Clarence Owsley, and the Tarrant County farm demonstrator, G. W. Eudaly. The proposal called for issuing $30,000 in stock to purchase the land and buildings on the Arlington Training School campus. In July 1915, the school incorporated with $15,000 in capital stock. Emboldened by the development, Taylor began a significant program of building construction that summer and fall. In total, $10,000 was spent to build a new two-story frame building that housed a library, science laboratories, a business office, and literary society accommodations, while also repairing almost all other buildings on campus.

In spring 1916, financial troubles and lawsuits once again impacted the school. Taylor accused the secretary-treasurer and other members of the board of directors of using most of the $10,000 allocated for repairing the campus's buildings for their own personal uses. In March of that year, Taylor informed stockholders that he would not lease the school after the 1915–16 academic year ended in May, breaking a contract he signed in summer 1915 in which he had agreed to lease the school's property for five years. The board then sued Taylor in district court, which ruled against him in February 1917. By the time of the verdict, however, Taylor had already left Arlington to work as an extension agent at Texas Woman's College in Denton.

=== Arlington Military Academy (1916–1917) ===
Arlington Military Academy was founded by John B. Dodson in 1916 and was only open for one academic year. Dodson was born in Tennessee in 1861 and educated at Carson-Newman College. Before moving to Arlington he had served as superintendent of schools in both Oak Cliff and McKinney, as president of Oak Cliff College, and as head of the University Military School for Boys in Dallas.

Like its predecessors, the school attempted to balance intellectualism with military exercises, instill discipline into its students, and prepare them for attending a university or a career in business. It was also open to both male and female students, and once again had an advisory board composed of many leading Arlington citizens. The Arlington Military Academy also fielded a football team, as its predecessors had.

After closing in 1917, there were no further attempts by the citizens of Arlington to support a private intermediate and secondary school. Arlington Military Academy had a disappointing enrollment, although the exact number of students enrolled is unknown. Little else is known about the school other than that it suffered from a lack of community support. Instead of trying to save it, in January 1917 Arlington leaders met to organize an effort to convince the Texas Legislature to grant the community a junior college in place of a military academy. In the end, the Arlington community was neither willing nor able to provide the necessary support for operating a private school in the community. Despite their failures, these private schools collectively educated hundreds of children over a period of 22 years.

== Sources ==
- Saxon, Gerald D. (1995). Transitions: A Centennial History of the University of Texas at Arlington, 1895–1995. Arlington, Texas: UTA Press. ISBN 0932408192.
- Barker, Evelyn; Worcester, Lea (2015). University of Texas at Arlington. Charleston, South Carolina: Arcadia Publishing. ISBN 9781439649732.
