= McCall Outdoor Science School =

Learning center in Idaho, U.S.

Coordinates: 44°55′36″N 116°05′20″W

The McCall Outdoor Science School (MOSS) is a year-round learning center that serves over 2500 Idaho K–12 students annually in residential and outreach settings. Field instructors for outdoor science programs are University of Idaho College of Natural Resources graduate students completing a certificate and master's degree in environmental education. The McCall Outdoor Science School also offers programs open to the public including Field Seminars, Faculty Lectures, and Community Partnerships. MOSS is Idaho's only residential outdoor science school.

The program is located outside of McCall, Idaho at the 14-acre (57,000 m^{2}) University of Idaho McCall Field Campus on Payette Lake and is operated through a partnership between the University of Idaho College of Natural Resources and Ponderosa State Park.

== History ==
The McCall Outdoor Science School was founded in 2001 by Steve Hollenhorst (University of Idaho College of Natural Resources) and Greg Fizzell (Palouse-Clearwater Environmental Institute).

A short history of the McCall Field Campus and MOSS is presented below:

1938 – UI secures access to property
1939 – Dining Hall built by Civilian Conservation Corps
1942 – Forestry "Summer Camp" begins
1970s – Cabins and bunkhouses built
1990s – Summer Camp ends, facilities, decline, maintenance backlog grows
2001 – K–12 programs started with 35 students in one week of programming
2003 – Grad program started with 8 students
2005 – AmeriCorps program started
2006 – $150K winterization improvements, year-round operation begins
2007 – Community Outreach programs implemented
2007 – Winter residential programs
2008 – NSF EPSCoR grant received for K–12 Science Education
2008 – Land Board grants 3-years to work out land exchange
2009 – Kresge Grant to support Field Campus Master Plan
2009 – FEMA fire mitigation and FireWise grant
2012 – Dr. Lee Vierling becomes Executive Director of MOSS and McCall Field Campus
2012 – Recipient of J.A. and Kathryn Albertson ID21 Award for Innovation in Education
2012 – DeVlieg Distinguished Scholars program established through donation from the DeVlieg Foundation
2013 – Recipient of W.K. Kellogg Foundation Award for Excellence in Outreach and Engagement for the Western United States
2013 – Named finalist for National APLU Magrath Award with Pennsylvania State University, Ohio State University, and University of Texas El Paso
2013 – New campus architectural master plan completed
2014 – Recipient of Idaho Power 'Powering Lives' grant

== K–12 program ==
MOSS classes are conducted outdoors, mostly in Ponderosa State Park. The park's ecosystems include coniferous forest, mountain streams, lake shore, wet meadows, and shrub-steppe environments. The subject of ecosystem science serves as the context for standards-based study of science, technology, mathematics, and language arts.

Team-building and mutual respect are important components of MOSS field programs. New life skills in communication and group decision-making result when students participate in a series of low-ropes elements. Clear communication, respect, and teamwork are stressed through active metaphor.

== Graduate program ==
The McCall Outdoor Science School (MOSS) graduate program includes several components. Sixteen graduate students serve as field instructors to K–12 student participants while earning 19 University of Idaho graduate course credits and developing a graduate project by partnering with a team of researchers or community members. Most of the work within the first year of the program takes place at the MOSS campus, with additional experience occurring in various schools around the state and at public agencies and nonprofit organizations across Idaho.

== Teacher education ==
MOSS offers summer and winter Teacher Institute focusing on teaching about topics such as climate, water, biofuels, and ecosystem services. K–12 teachers spend a long weekend on MOSS working alongside university scientists to discover current findings in scientific research fields and how these findings can be integrated into the classroom.
