= Robert Hollenhorst =

American physician

Robert W. Hollenhorst (12 August 1913, in St. Cloud, Minnesota – 10 January 2008, in Rochester, Minnesota) was an American ophthalmologist remembered for describing Hollenhorst plaques.

== Biography ==
Robert Hollenhorst was educated at St. Cloud State University and St. John's University, and graduated from the University of Minnesota Medical School in 1941. He served as a physician in the Army Medical Corps in New Guinea and the Philippines, receiving the Bronze Star Medal. After the war he studied at the Mayo Clinic and joined the staff in 1949, becoming professor of ophthalmology at the Mayo Graduate School of Medicine. His research led to the description of cholesterol plaques in retinal blood vessels which indicate atherosclerosis and increased risk of stroke.

He served as president of the American Ophthalmological Society in 1982 and was awarded its Lucien Howe Medal in 1986. He was also vice chairman of the American Board of Ophthalmology. He was consulting ophthalmologist to Minnesota State Services for the Blind for 30 years, and a founder of the Minnesota Pre-school Medical Survey of Vision and Hearing. Governor of Minnesota Arne Carlson declared 24 April 1991 Dr. Robert Hollenhorst Day in recognition of his services to the state.
