= Karen Morse (chemist) =

Chemist and university president

- Born: Karen Dale Williams
- Education: University of Michigan
- Scientific career
- Workplaces: Utah State University; Western Washington University
- Thesis: Reactions of the borane group as a Lewis acid (1967)

Karen Dale Williams Morse is an inorganic chemist. She was president of Western Washington University from 1993 until 2008, and was named the Bowman Distinguished Professor in 2014. She is an elected fellow of the American Association for the Advancement of Science.

== Education and career ==
Morse has a B.A. from Denison University (1962), and an M.S. and Ph.D. from the University of Michigan. During her Ph.D. she worked on Lewis acids. Morse joined the faculty of Utah State University in 1968 in the department of chemistry and biochemistry, and subsequently became the department head, the dean, and was named provost in 1989. In 1993 she moved to Western Washington University where she was president until 2008. In 2014, Morse was named the Bowman Distinguished Professor at Western Washington University.

Morse's early research centered on the production and properties of phosphines. She also worked on borohydrides, phosphite, metal-phosphorus compounds, aryl phosphines Morse also led the professional training committee at the American Chemical Society where she expanded on options for recognizing educators who teach chemistry at the undergraduate and high school level.

== Selected publications ==
- Takusagawa, Fusao; Fumagalli, Alessandro; Koetzle, Thomas F.; Shore, Sheldon G.; Schmitkons, Thomas; Fratini, Albert V.; Morse, Karen W.; Wei, Chiau-Yu; Bau, Robert (1981). "Neutron and x-ray diffraction studies of tris(methyldiphenylphosphine)[tetrahydroborato(1-)]copper, Cu[P(C6H5)2CH3]3(BH4). The first accurate characterization of an unsupported metal-hydrogen-boron bridge bond". Journal of the American Chemical Society. 103 (17): 5165–5171. Bibcode:1981JAChS.103.5165T. doi:10.1021/ja00407a035. ISSN 0002-7863.
- Morse, Karen W.; Morse, Joseph G. (1973). "Free radical reactions of tetrafluorodiphosphine. Preparation of 1,2-bis(difluorophosphino)ethane". Journal of the American Chemical Society. 95 (25): 8469–8470. Bibcode:1973JAChS..95.8469M. doi:10.1021/ja00806a057. ISSN 0002-7863.
- Morse, Joseph G.; Morse, Karen W. (1975). "Photoreactions of tetrafluorodiphosphine with nonsubstituted olefins and perfluoroolefins". Inorganic Chemistry. 14 (3): 565–569. doi:10.1021/ic50145a024. ISSN 0020-1669.
- Fife, Dennis J.; Moore, William M.; Morse, Karen W. (1984). "Solution equilibria of tertiary phosphine complexes of copper(I) halides". Inorganic Chemistry. 23 (12): 1684–1691. doi:10.1021/ic00180a011. ISSN 0020-1669.
- Bommer, Jerry C.; Morse, Karen W. (1980). "Single hydrogen-boron bridged species: tris(methyldiphenylphosphine) complexes of silver(I) and copper(I) containing tetrahydroborate and (ethoxycarbonyl)trihydroborate". Inorganic Chemistry. 19 (3): 587–593. doi:10.1021/ic50205a003. ISSN 0020-1669.

== Awards and honors ==
Morse was elected a fellow of the American Association for the Advancement of Science in 1986. In 1997 she received the Garvan–Olin Medal for scientific accomplishments by a woman chemist from the American Chemical Society. In 2012 Western Washington University named the chemistry building the Karen W. Morse Hall in recognition of her. In 2021, Utah State University awarded her with an honorary doctorate.
