= Guiling Wang =

Chinese-born computer scientist

Guiling "Grace" Wang is a Chinese-born computer scientist whose research spans artificial intelligence, finance, and transportation. She has published on mobile wireless sensor networks, especially vehicular ad hoc networks and their applications in intelligent transportation systems, work for which she was honored as an IEEE Fellow. She currently teaches at the New Jersey Institute of Technology (NJIT), where she is a distinguished professor of computer science, associate dean for research at its Ying Wu College of Computing, and the founding director of the university's Center for AI Research.

== Early life and education ==
Wang was born and raised in China. Upon entering Nankai University in Tianjin, Wang initially chose biochemistry as her major. Drawn to computer science, she was able to switch to the software major after completing a competitive application process. She graduated in three years with a B.S. degree. In 2006, she completed a Ph.D. in computer science and engineering with a minor in statistics from Pennsylvania State University; her dissertation was on the topic of sensor networks and their dependability in handling data.

== Career and honors ==
Wang joined the New Jersey Institute of Technology in 2006. She was elected an IEEE Fellow in 2022, "for contributions to distributed algorithm design for sensor networks and vehicular networks". She is a member of the IEEE Communications Society and Computer Society. Upon her election as a fellow, Wang became the first female IEEE Fellow at NJIT. She is also a fellow of the Asia-Pacific Artificial Intelligence Association, and has spoken at other universities, including Virginia Tech.
