= Sabah Randhawa =

Pakistani-born engineer and academic (born 1954)

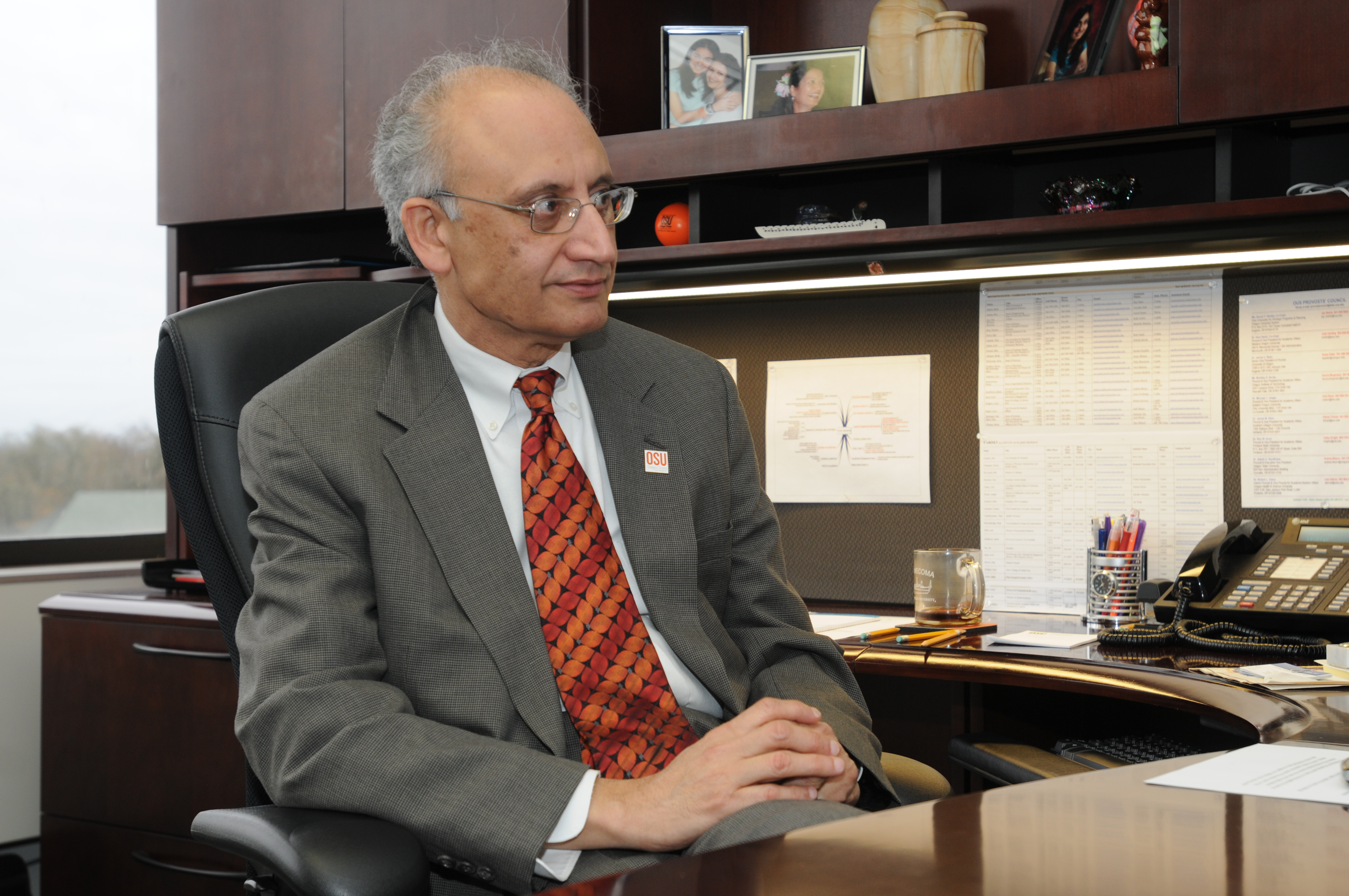
- Randhawa in 2010

14th President of Western Washington University
- Incumbent
- Assumed office August 1, 2016
- Preceded by: Bruce Shepard

Personal details
- Born: 1954 (age 71–72) Lahore, Punjab, Pakistan
- Spouse: Uzma Ahmad
- Education: University of Engineering and Technology, Lahore (BS); Oregon State University (MS); Arizona State University (PhD)

Academic work
- Discipline: Engineering; Academic administration
- Institutions: Oregon State University; Western Washington University

Sabah U. Randhawa is a Pakistani-American engineer, currently serving as the 14th president of Western Washington University since 2016.

He is a fellow of the Institute of Industrial Engineers, and a recipient of the 2023 District VIII Leadership Award from the Council for Advancement and Support of Education.

== Early life and education ==
Randhawa was born in Lahore in 1954; neither of his parents attended college. Randhawa and his sister attended a co-educational school in Pakistan that was operated by the Church of England. Their tuition was paid by Sabah's father, a pharmaceutical salesman.

Randhawa received a Bachelor of Science in chemical engineering from the University of Engineering and Technology, Lahore in 1976. After graduating from university in Pakistan, Randhawa worked as an engineer at a chemical plant in the countryside. He saved up money for two years until he had enough to travel overseas for study. He received a Master of Science in industrial engineering from Oregon State University in 1980 and a Doctor of Philosophy in industrial engineering from Arizona State University in 1983.

== Career ==
Some time after studying as a graduate student at Oregon State University (OSU), Randhawa worked in multiple roles within OSU's engineering college; he eventually became the Provost & Executive Vice President, the institution's second-ranked administrator.

During his time at OSU, Randhawa was one of four candidates vying to become the chancellor of University of Nebraska–Lincoln. He was also a candidate for the chancellor position at Southern Illinois University Carbondale before withdrawing in 2015. He withdrew his candidacy for the Nebraska chancellorship in March 2016 after he was declared the sole finalist for the presidential search at Western.

=== Western Washington University ===
In March 2016, the Western Board of Trustees voted unanimously to nominate Randhawa as university president. One of the terms in his presidential contract at Western was that he would become a tenured professor on top of his role as president.

In 2020, a whistleblower reported that the university's education department fraudulently used "ghost courses," non-existent courses for which students were earning credit, to assist the students in receiving federal financial aid. The whistleblower successfully sued the state of Washington for retaliation, alleging in part that Randhawa had fired the whistleblower for refusing to remove the word fraud from the original ghost courses report. In April 2025, Randhawa signed an open letter circulated by the American Association of Colleges and Universities in response to "unprecedented government overreach" by the Trump administration.
