= College of the Environment (Western Washington University) =

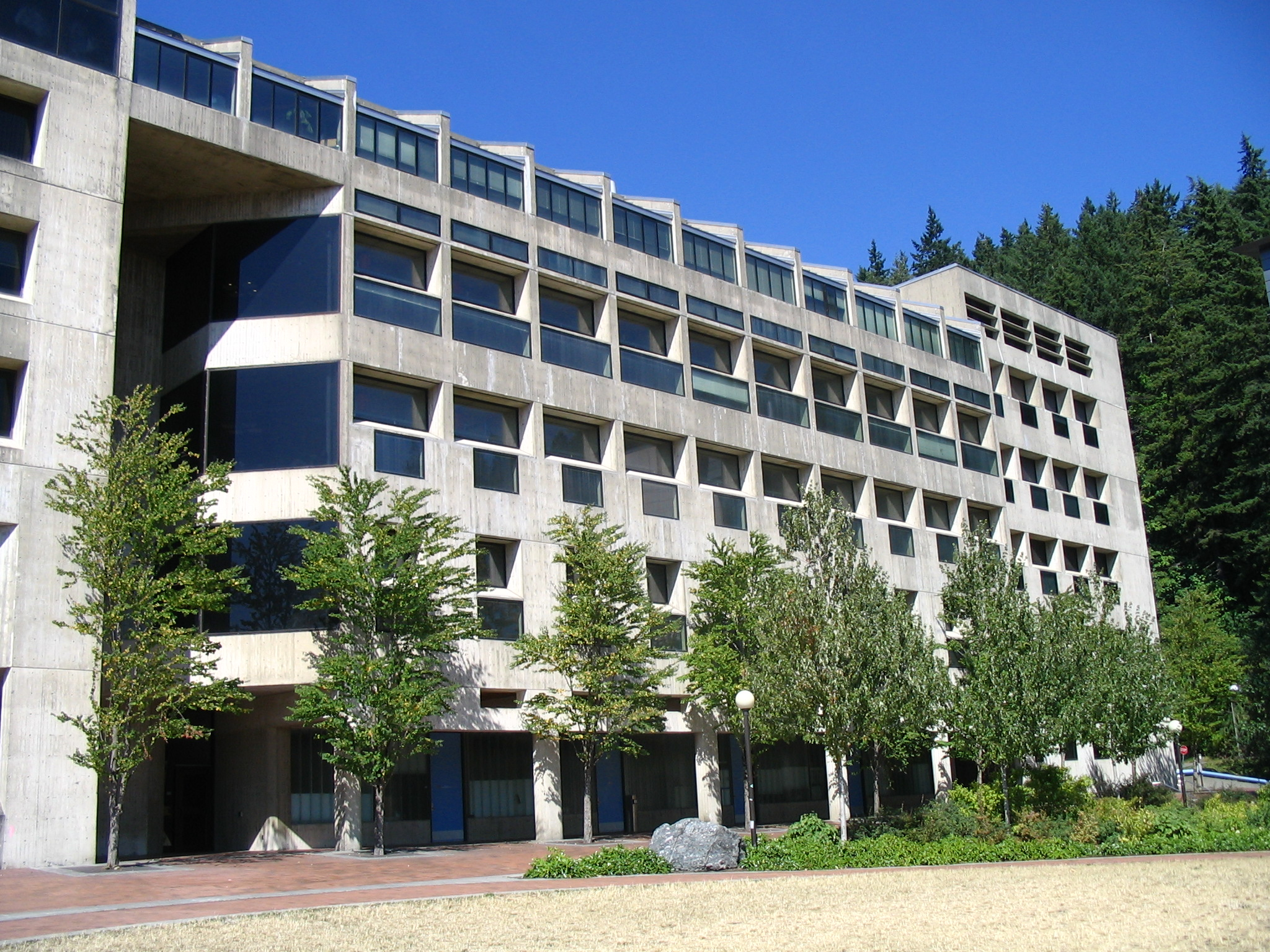
- Environmental Studies Building, home of the College of the Environment, 2008
- Type: Public Baccalaureate
- Established: 1969
- Dean: Teena Gabrielson
- Location: Bellingham, Washington, United States; 48°44′00″N 122°29′08″W
- Website: College of the Environment

The College of the Environment at Western Washington University is one of the oldest environmental colleges in the US.

== Departments and programs ==
The college has two departments, Environmental Science and Environmental Studies, and offers a variety of undergraduate and graduate degrees.

=== Undergraduate degrees ===
- B.S. in Environmental Science
- B.A. in Environmental Studies, Environmental Policy, Geography, Environmental Education, and Urban Planning and Sustainable Development.
- B.A. and B.S. in Energy Studies (with the College of Business and Economics and the College of Science and Engineering).
- B.A. in Business and Sustainability (with the College of Business and Economics).
- Combined degrees in Environmental Studies-Elementary Education (B.A.E.), Geography-Elementary Education (B.A.E.), Geography-Social Studies (B.A.), and Economics-Environmental Studies (B.A.).

=== Graduate degrees ===
- M.S. Environmental Science
- M.A. in EnvironmentaL Studies
- M.S. in Marine and Estuarine Science (MESP)
- M.Ed. in Environmental Education

== Alumni ==
Over 7,500 students have graduated from the College of the Environment, many going on to work in various environmental-related industries including: habitat biology, renewable energy, environmental education, and more. Alumni are represented in the senior levels of various local, state, and federal institutions.
