= Faisalabad International Airport =

International airport in Faisalabad, Punjab

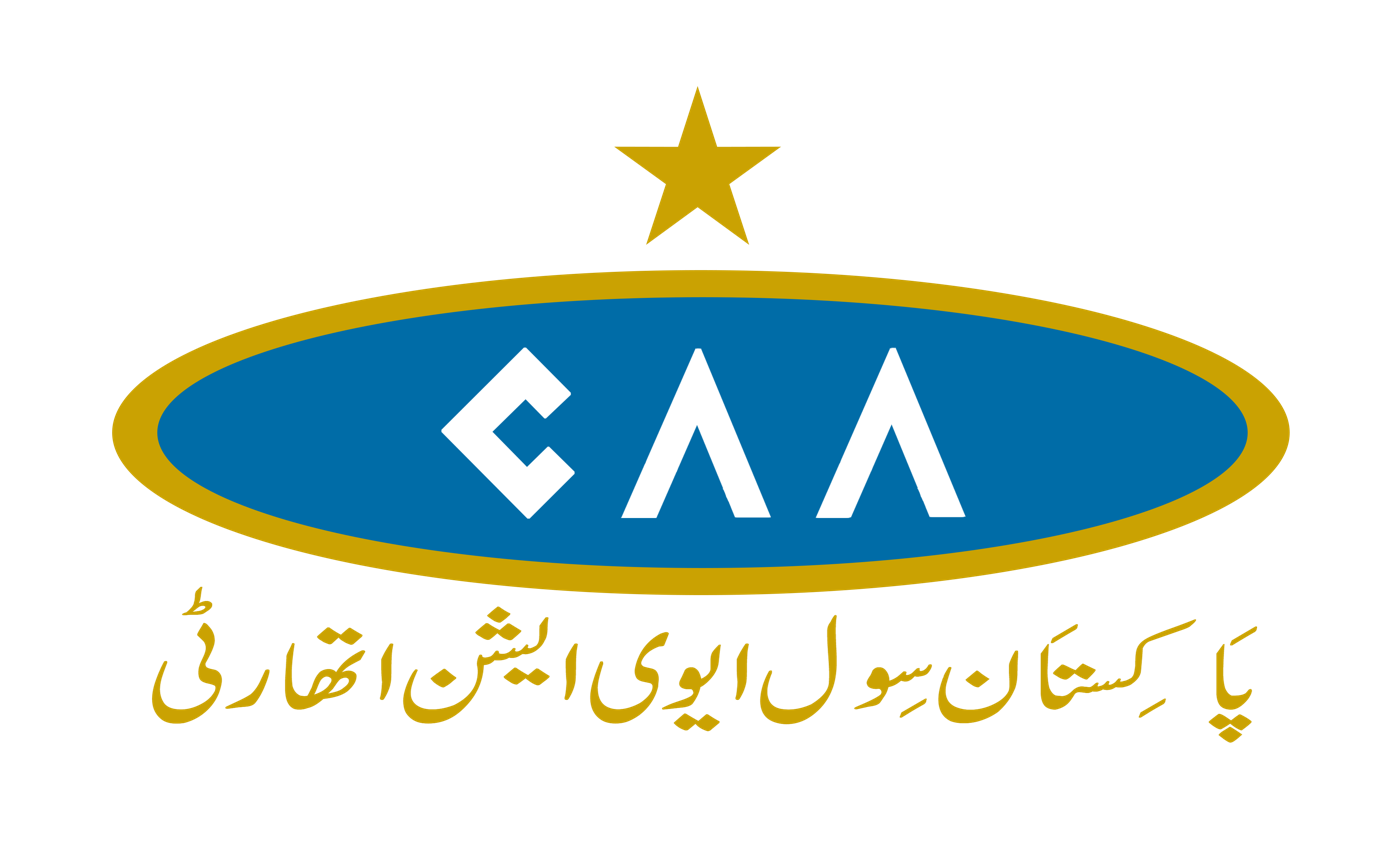
Faisalabad International Airport فیصل آباد بین الاقوامی ہوائی اڈا

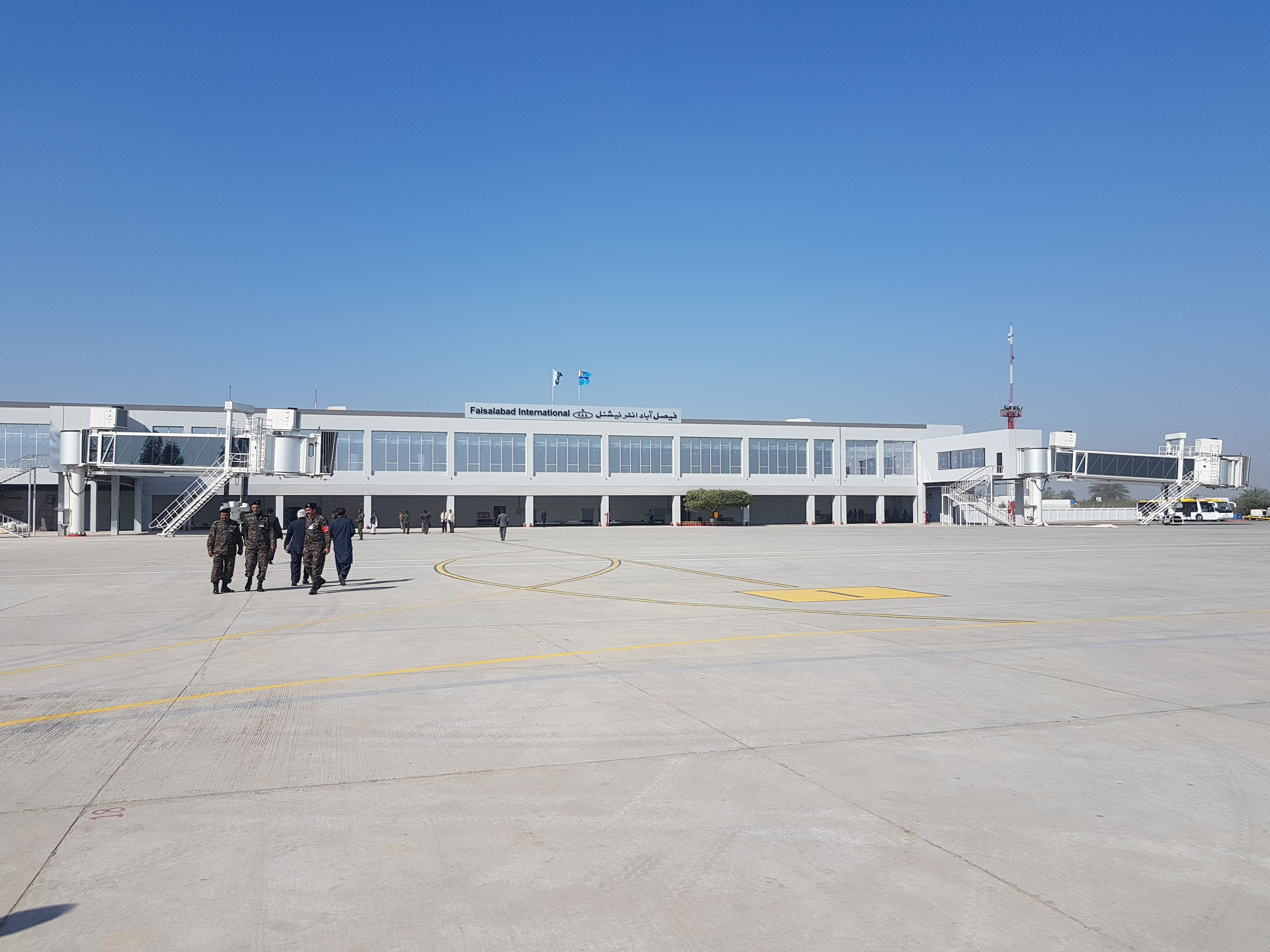
- IATA: LYP; ICAO: OPFA

Summary
- Airport type: Public
- Owner: Government of Pakistan
- Operator: Pakistan Airports Authority
- Serves: Faisalabad
- Location: Faisalabad-38000, Punjab, Pakistan
- Elevation AMSL: 607 ft (185 m)
- Coordinates: 31°21′54″N 072°59′41″E
- Website: faisalabadairport.com.pk
- Interactive map of Faisalabad International Airport

Runways
Direction	Length		Surface
Direction	m	ft	Surface
03L/21R 03R/21L	2,743 2,743	9,272 9,272	Concrete Asphalt

Statistics (July 2024 – June 2025)
- Passengers: 417,203 ▼2.27%
- Aircraft movements: 3,083 ▼4.25%
- Cargo handled: 52 metric tons ▲13.04%
- Source: Statistics from the Pakistan Civil Aviation Authority

Faisalabad International Airport (IATA: LYP, ICAO: OPFA) is an international airport and standby Pakistan Air Force military base situated on Jhang Road, 10 kilometres (6.2 mi) southwest of the city centre of Faisalabad, in the Punjab province of Pakistan. The airport is home to two flying schools who use the airfield for regular training for new cadets and aviation enthusiasts.

The airport serves the population of Faisalabad and several local cities such as Tandlianwala, Kamalia, Jaranwala, Jhang, Chiniot, Gojra, Dijkot, Samundri, Khurrianwala, Sangla Hill, Toba Tek Singh, Rabwah, Sargodha, Bhawana, Pir Mahal, Chak Jhumra, Khichian, Jahangir Klan, and Lalian.

With a large diaspora of Faisalabadis living abroad, the Pakistan Civil Aviation Authority has signed a new open policy to allow more airlines to operate from the city. The airport underwent a major transformation where the terminal building was completely remodelled to handle larger aircraft and passenger loads. The new terminal was opened in early 2018.

== History ==
=== Early years ===
The airport traces its origins to the British Raj. The city government decided that Faisalabad had a strategic position within the South Asia and the British Empire. In 1942, the local government gave permission for the construction of a bricked strip measuring 1,524 metres by 30.4 metres . Regional aircraft used the strip, and it played a role in the fighting and evacuation during the struggle for independence.

It was originally known as Lyallpur Airfield and had been known as such until 1979 when the city was renamed as Faisalabad, in honour of late King Faisal of Saudi Arabia. It was henceforth renamed to Faisalabad Airport; the International Air Transport Association code remained LYP.

=== After independence ===
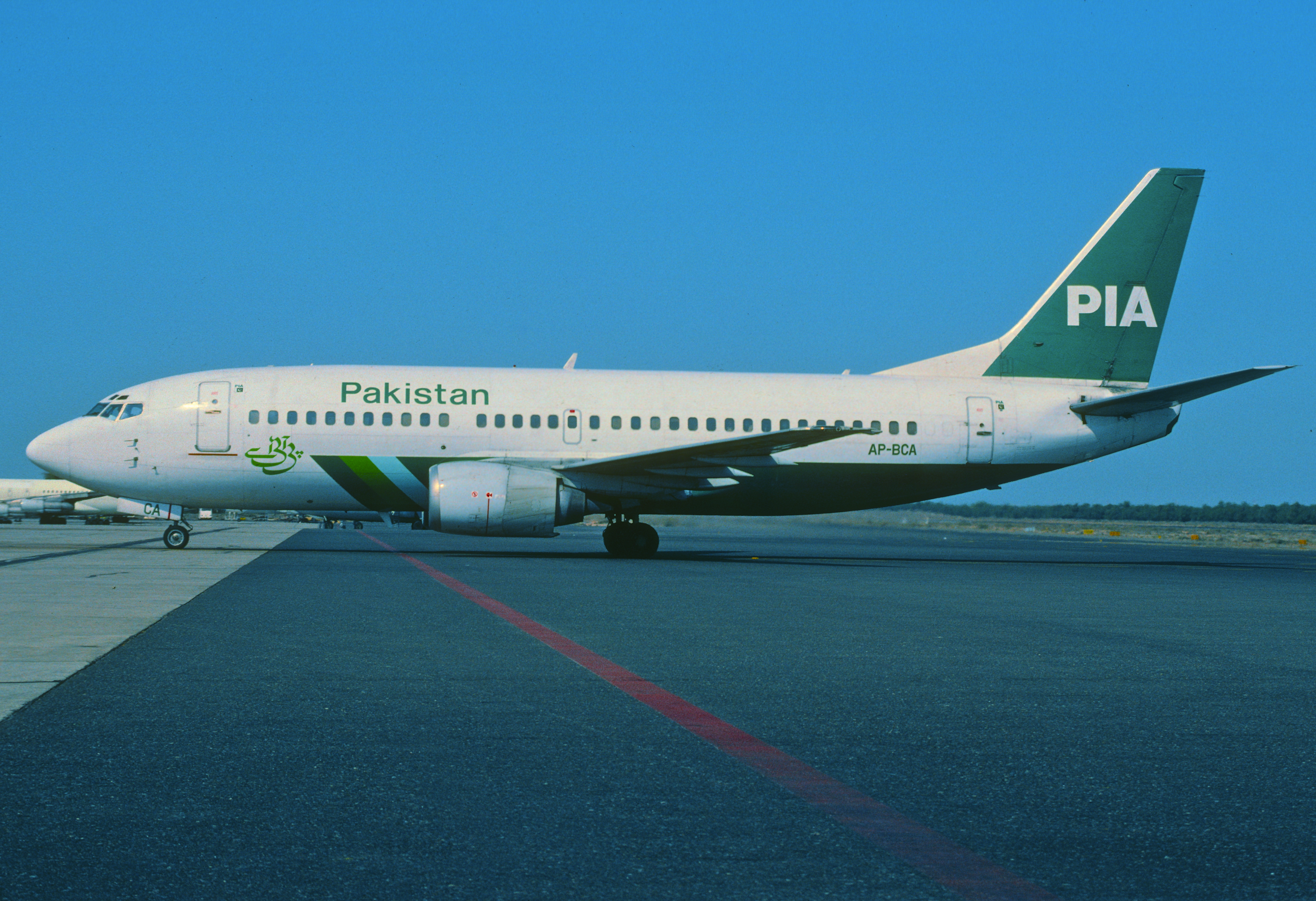
PIA operated the first jet aircraft from Karachi to Faisalabad using a Boeing 737-300.

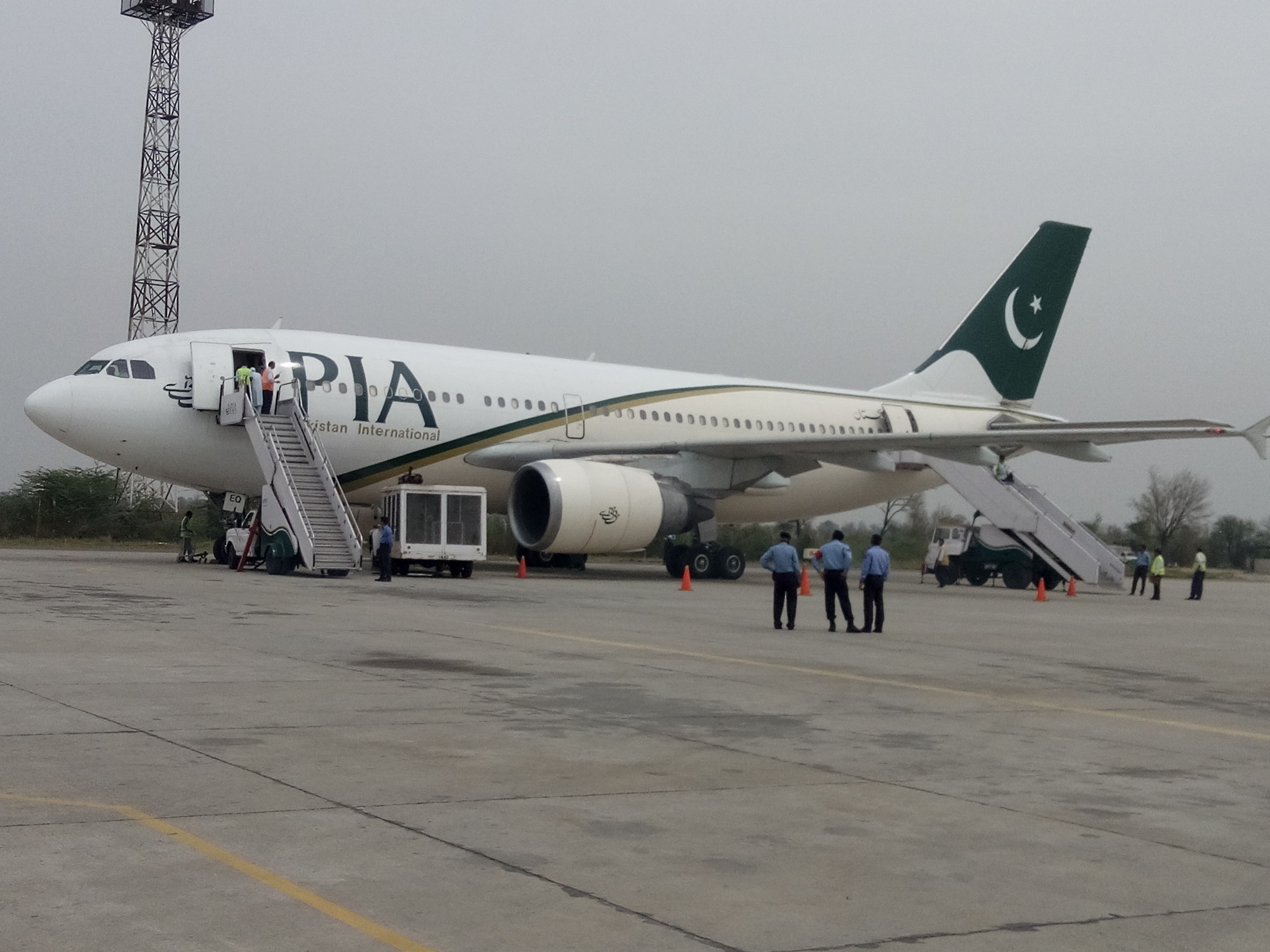
PIA Airbus A310-308 used on the Glasgow, UK - Faisalabad route.

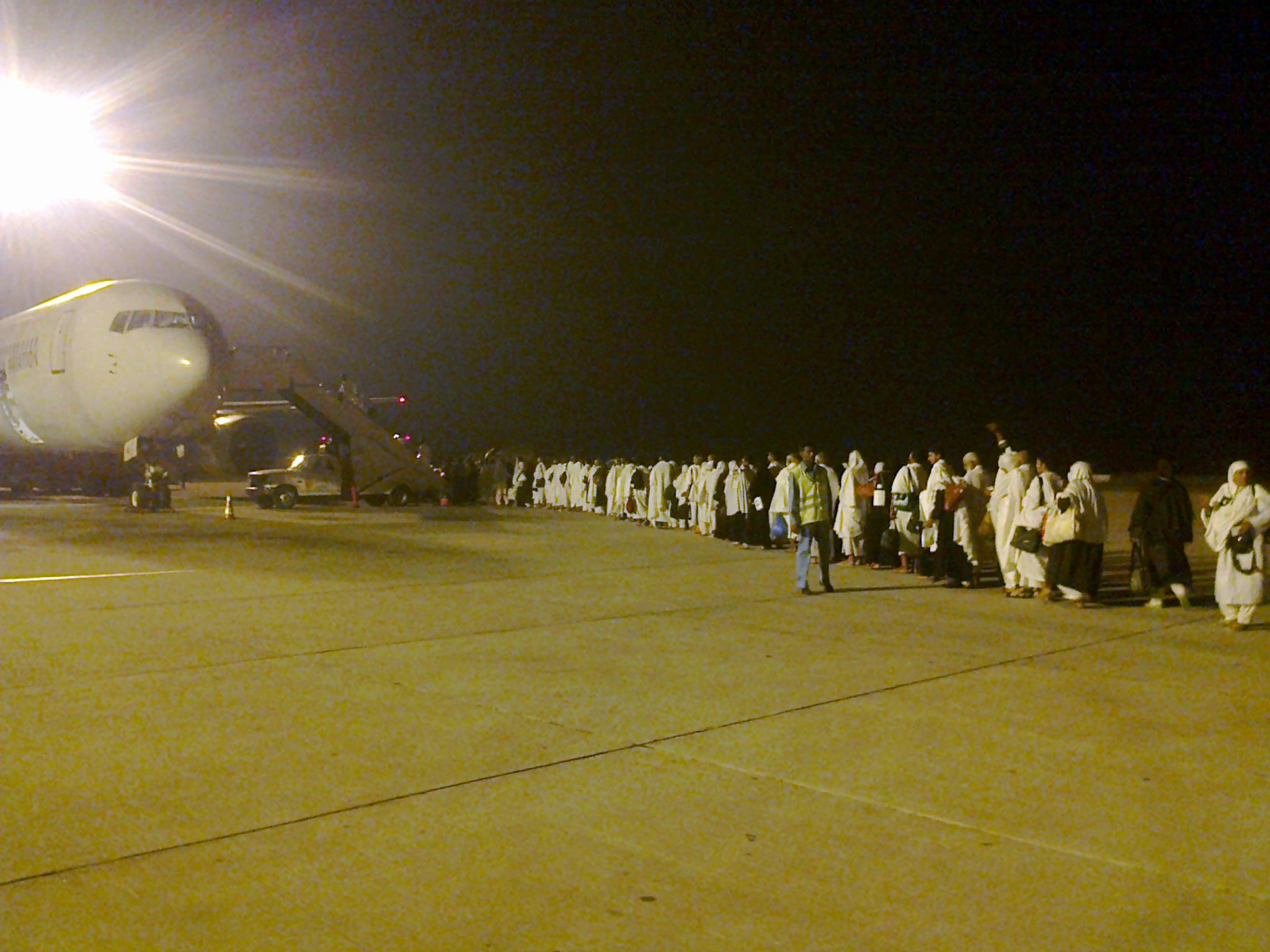
Shaheen Air operating Faisalabad - Jeddah flights using Boeing 767.

The national flag carrier, Pakistan International Airlines (PIA) began domestic operations in 1958 operating several flights from Karachi. The majority of the flights contained cargo for export. In 1965, the bricked airstrip was re-built to meet standards at that time. The surface was built using bitumen and the length of the runway increased to 2,743 metres by 30.4 metres to allow the airport to handle larger aircraft. During 1966–1967 construction began for a terminal and apron to handle propeller aircraft such as the Fokker F-27 Friendship.

In 1972 a new parallel runway with dimensions 2,743 metres by 30.4 metres was constructed west of the existing runway, since the existing runway had deteriorated quite significantly. The new runway was designed to handle jet fuelled aircraft such as the Boeing 737. In 1974 a jet apron, Taxiway-B, Air Traffic Control tower and Met office were constructed. A premium lounge and Instrument Landing System (ILS) were installed in 1985. In 1986 the terminal building was extended to accommodate greater number of passengers. In 1991, the old runway was widened, strengthened and extended reaching dimensions of 9270' by 150' with surface bitumen to accommodate Airbus aircraft such as Airbus A310s. In 1993, a business class CIP Lounge was constructed and the terminal building was extended. In 1998, direct Hajj operations were started from the airport to Saudi Arabia.

On 20 December 2003, Aero Asia International launched twice a week operations from LYP to Dubai and increased its Karachi flights to thrice a week. In 2005, PIA launched direct flights from the capital city of Scotland, Glasgow to LYP with Airbus A310 aircraft. The airline also launched e-ticketing from the airport in December of the same year. In December 2007, PIA operated its first Hajj flight from the city. In 2008, PIA began to operate flights from LYP to Sialkot International Airport, but this was soon axed. However, flights to Dubai were added. In 2009, PIA launched services from LYP to Rahim Yar Khan and Abu Dhabi. In 2010, PIA connected Bahawalpur to the city. In 2011, Shaheen Air was given approval to operate seasonal Hajj flights from Faisalabad to Jeddah. In the same year, Etihad Airways launched coach services for passengers based in Faisalabad to Lahore Airport. In 2012, Shaheen Air upgraded its Hajj flights to Boeing 767s. In June 2013, PIA ended its services to Abu Dhabi, Dubai and Multan due to non-availability of aircraft. Shaheen Air decided to launch operations in October of the same year to Dubai. In 2014, Air Indus launched its services to Karachi using Boeing 737-300s.

=== Expansion plans ===
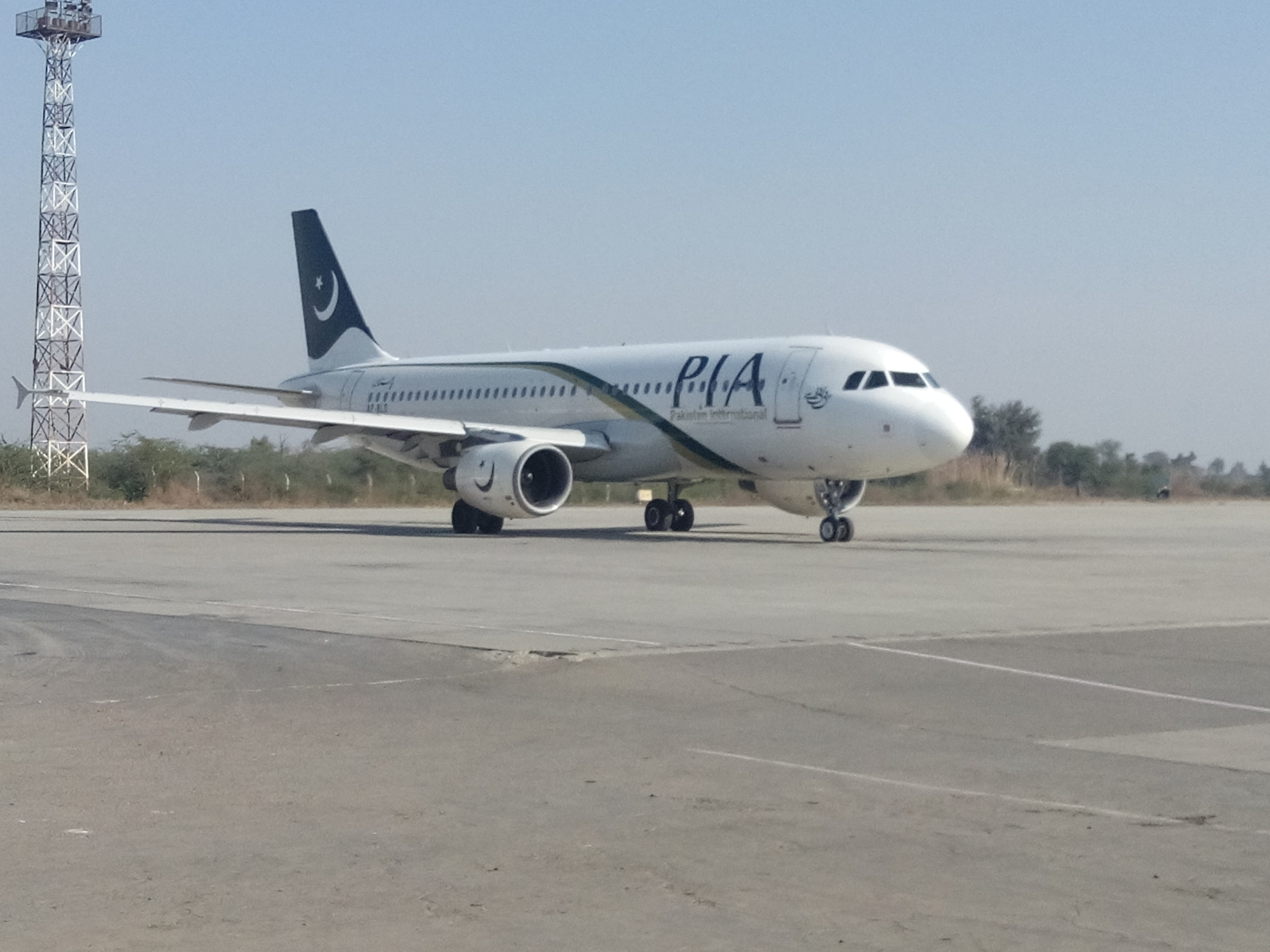
Pakistan International Airlines Airbus A320-200-214 arrived from Jinnah International Airport, Karachi on 15 December 2015.

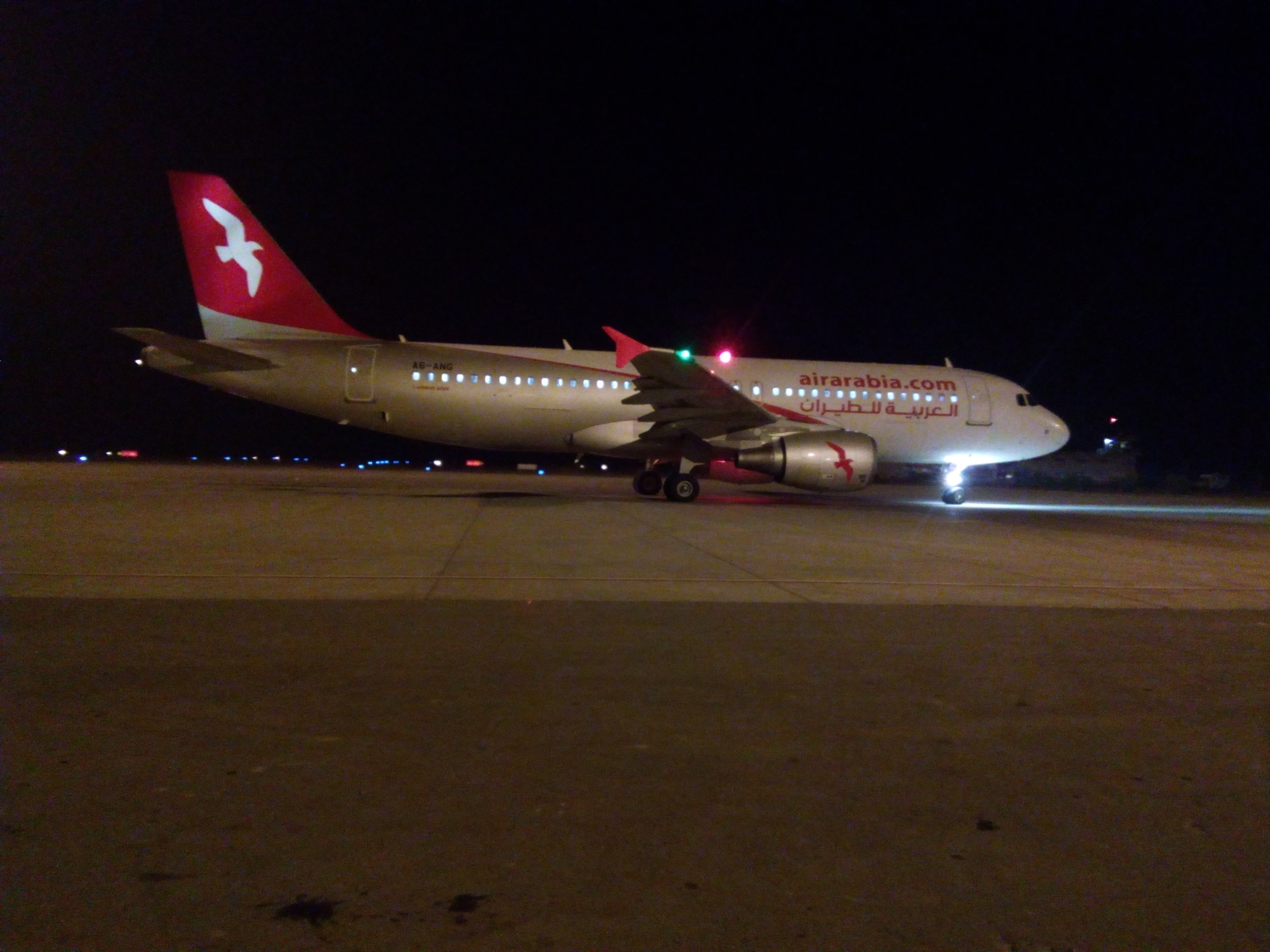
Air Arabia A320 starting up for its return flight to Sharjah.

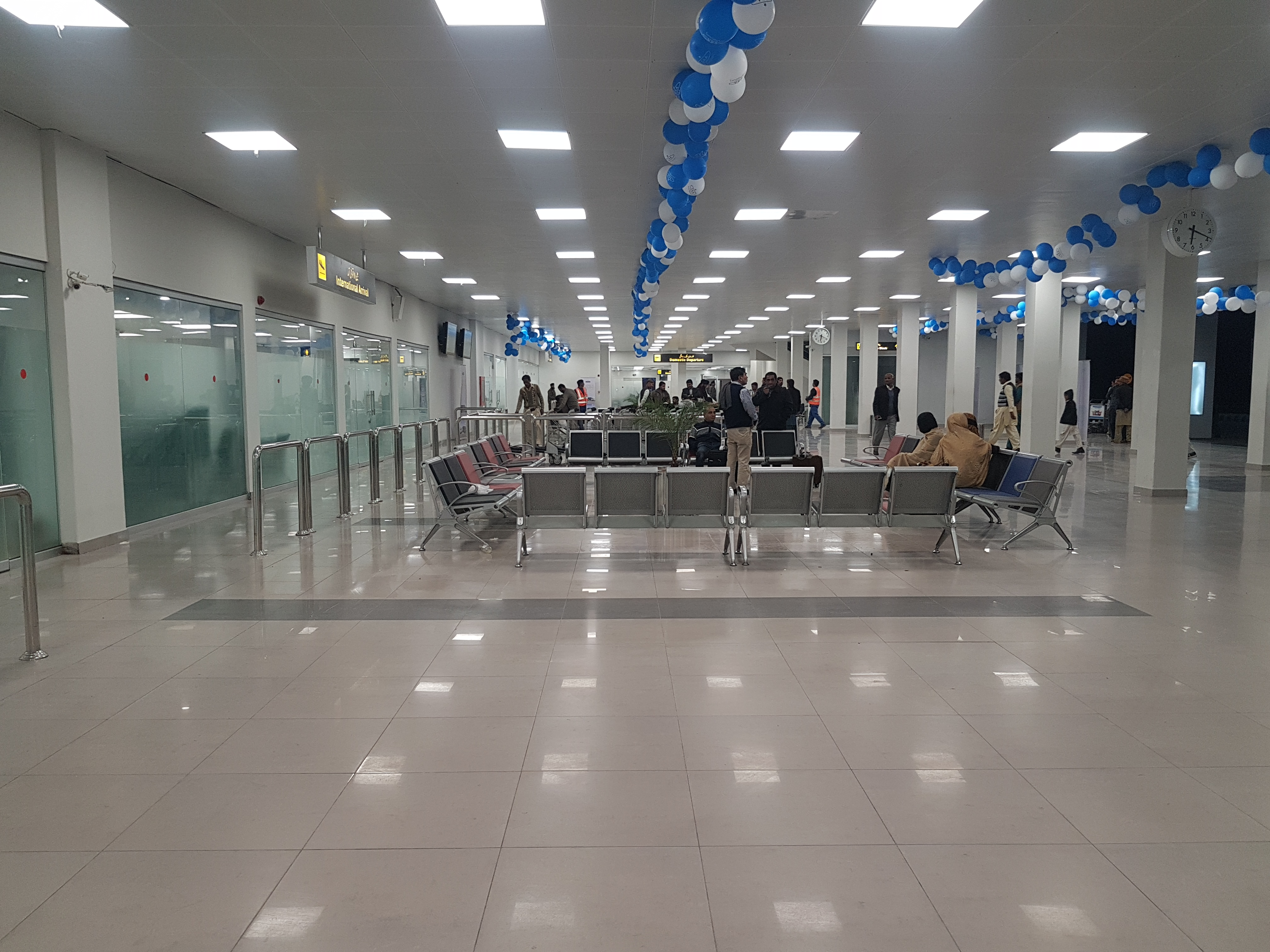
The newly renovated visitors gallery which features new seating, lighting and FIDS.

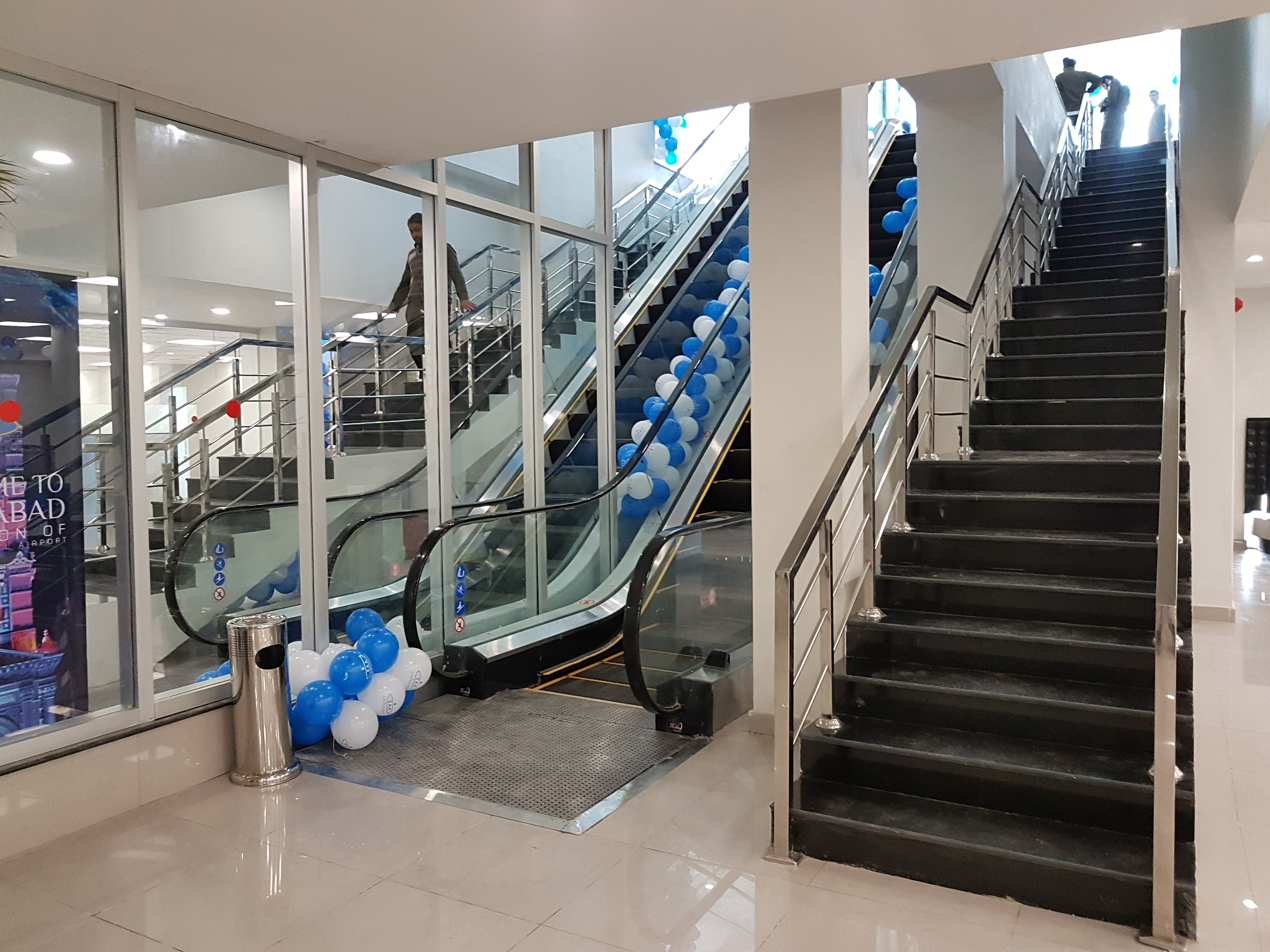
The expansion of the terminal now means the holding lounges are located on Level-1.

On 22 February 2015, Shujaat Azeem, aviation advisor to the Prime Minister, announced on his X (formerly Twitter) page that LYP would be upgraded to international standards and more international flights would soon be launched from the city. On 5 March 2015 Qatar Airways announced its thrice a week service linking Doha to Faisalabad. The service would be operated by Airbus A321/A320 aircraft. On 9 April 2015, the airport was inspected by Shujaat Azeem, Air Marshal (Retd) Muhammad Yousaf (Director General of Pakistan Civil Aviation Authority), Engineer Rizwan Ashraf (President of the Faisalabad Chamber of Commerce & Industries) and Rana Mohammad Afzal Khan (Member of Parliament, MNA). It was announced that the airport will be upgraded to meet international standards of the IATA/ICAO. It was disclosed by the PCAA that the airport will undergo the following work:

- Extension of the current passenger terminal
- Construction of a new cargo complex
- Extension & upgrading of the current runway to handle larger aircraft
- Construction of a new taxiway.
- Renovation of the aircraft stands (apron)
- Renovation of the arrivals/departure/business class lounges.
- Renovation of the airport approach road (including LED lighting)

On 1 June 2015 Air Arabia announced that it will operate thrice a week service from Sharjah and Faisalabad from 18 September 2015. Faisalabad will become the eighth city to which Air Arabia operate in Pakistan. On 15 June 2015, Flydubai announced daily flights to Faisalabad from 10 July 2015 with an increase to nine a week from 3 August. On 11 July 2015, Gerry's dnata and Royal Airport Services set up their ground handling services from the airport. On 20 August 2015, Shaheen Air launched Hajj flights to Medina using Airbus A320. On 7 October 2015, Gulf Air announced thrice a week flights from Bahrain to Faisalabad starting 22 December 2015. On 6 November 2015, Turkish Airlines surveyed the airport for operations in 2016 with the commitment to build a new business class lounge. On 2 December 2015, PIA announced once a week flights to Jeddah and Medina. The Jeddah flights will be operated using an Airbus A310 from 8 January 2016 whilst the Medina flights will be an Airbus A320 on 22 December 2015. On 24 December 2015, the foundation stone was laid to commence the renovation and expansion of the airport.

On 8 November 2016, PIA reinstated Islamabad and Multan as domestic operations and increased the Jeddah flights from two to thrice a week. On 6 April 2017, Shaheen Air announced its return to Faisalabad with initial flights to Karachi, Riyadh and Sharjah to begin in May with Jeddah and Madina to follow suit, SereneAir is all set to start three weekly flights from Faisalabad to Karachi and back starting from 20 April 2017. On 1 October 2017, an agreement was signed with the Adelte Group, a Barcelona-based organisation, to provide two glass boarding bridges for the new terminal. On 31 October 2017, Shaheen Air officially launched its inaugural flight from Faisalabad to Sharjah using Airbus A319. On 20 January 2018, the Prime Minister of Pakistan inaugurated the new expanded terminal. On 27 March 2018, Shaheen Air announced the city's first direct flights to Muscat, the capital of Oman with flights beginning on 15 April 2018. On 30 October 2019, PIA resumed its operations from the city to Dubai using Airbus A320, operating twice a week.

== Structure ==
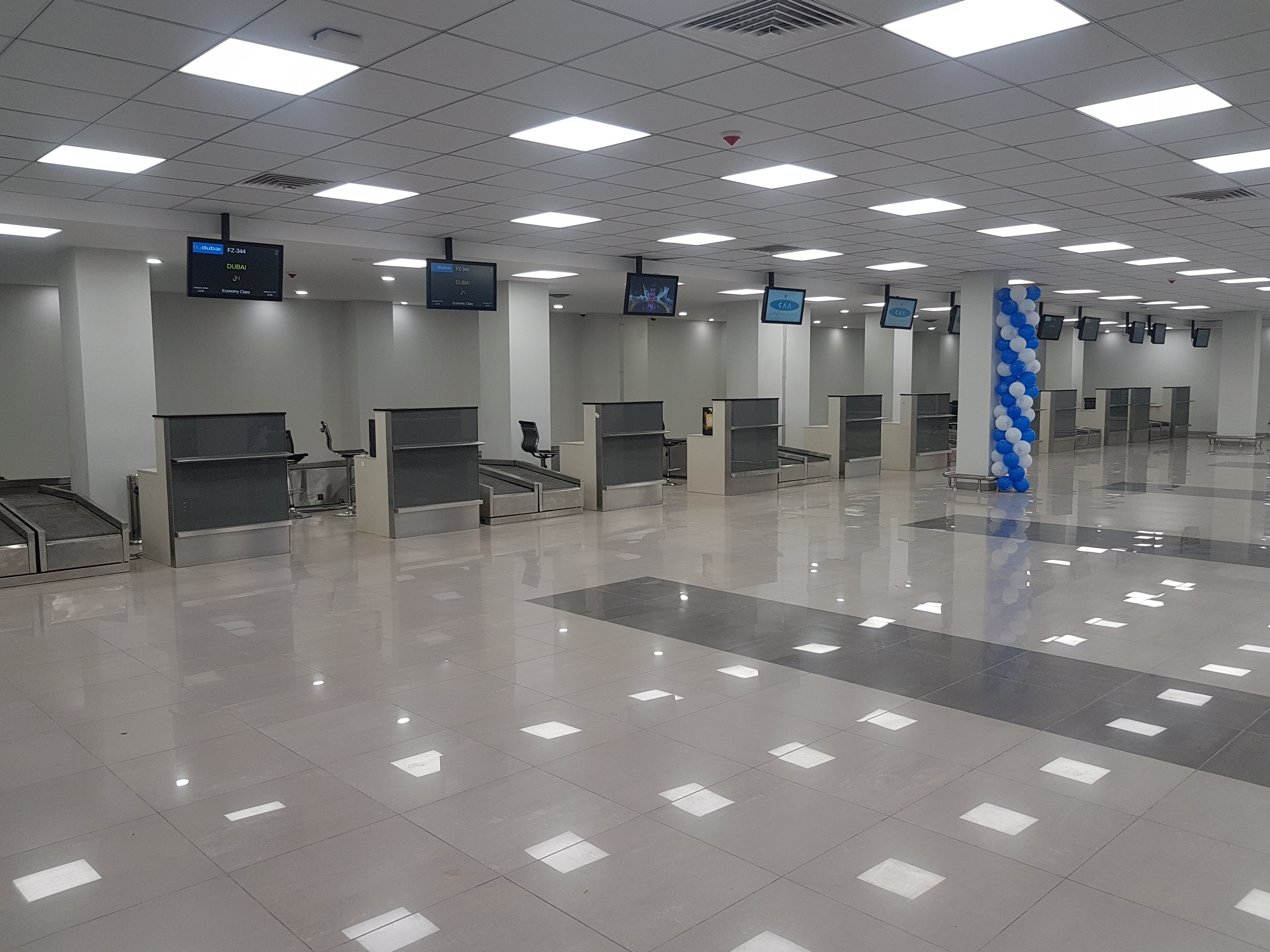
Check in Counters.

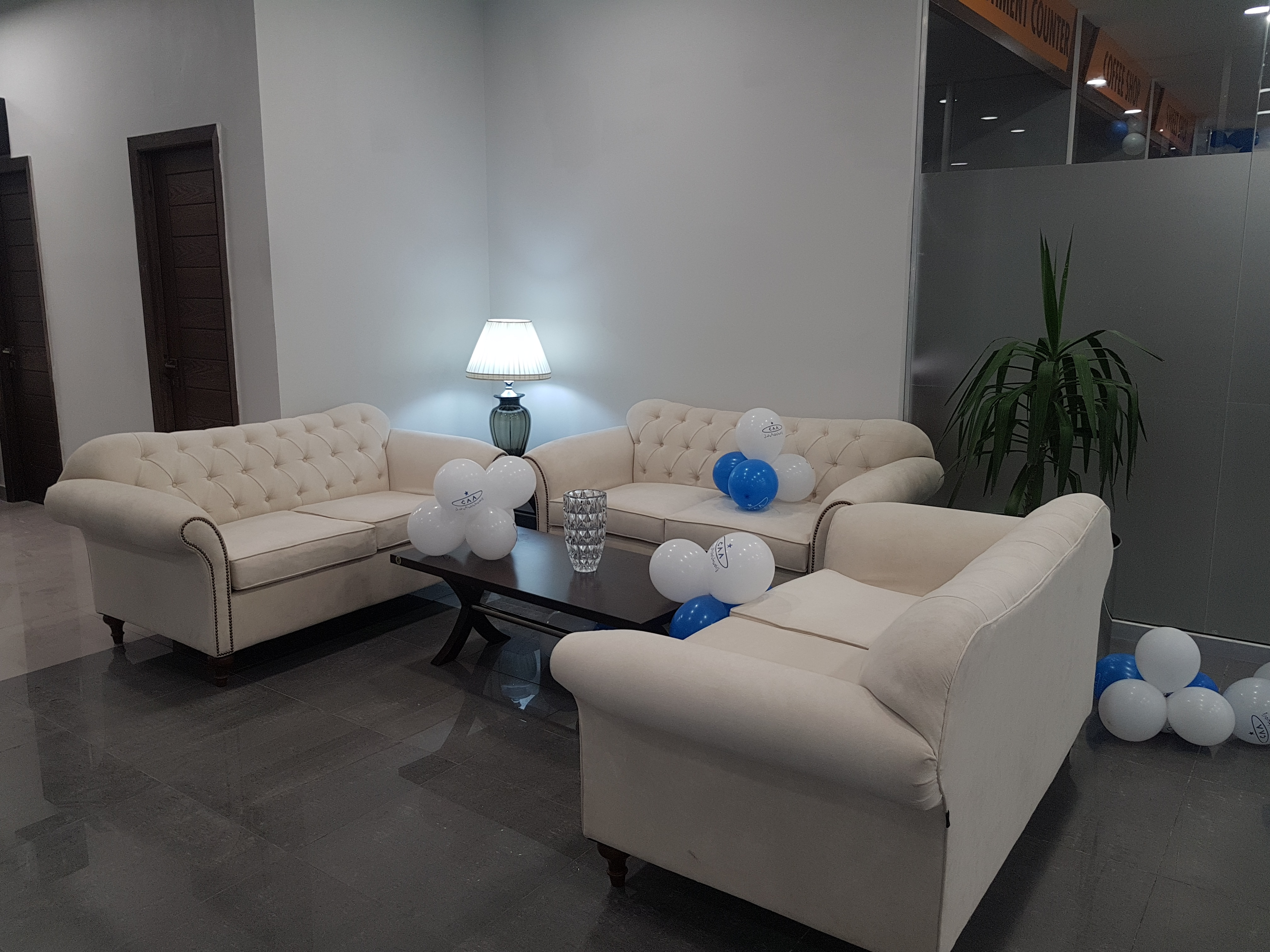
International premium lounge.

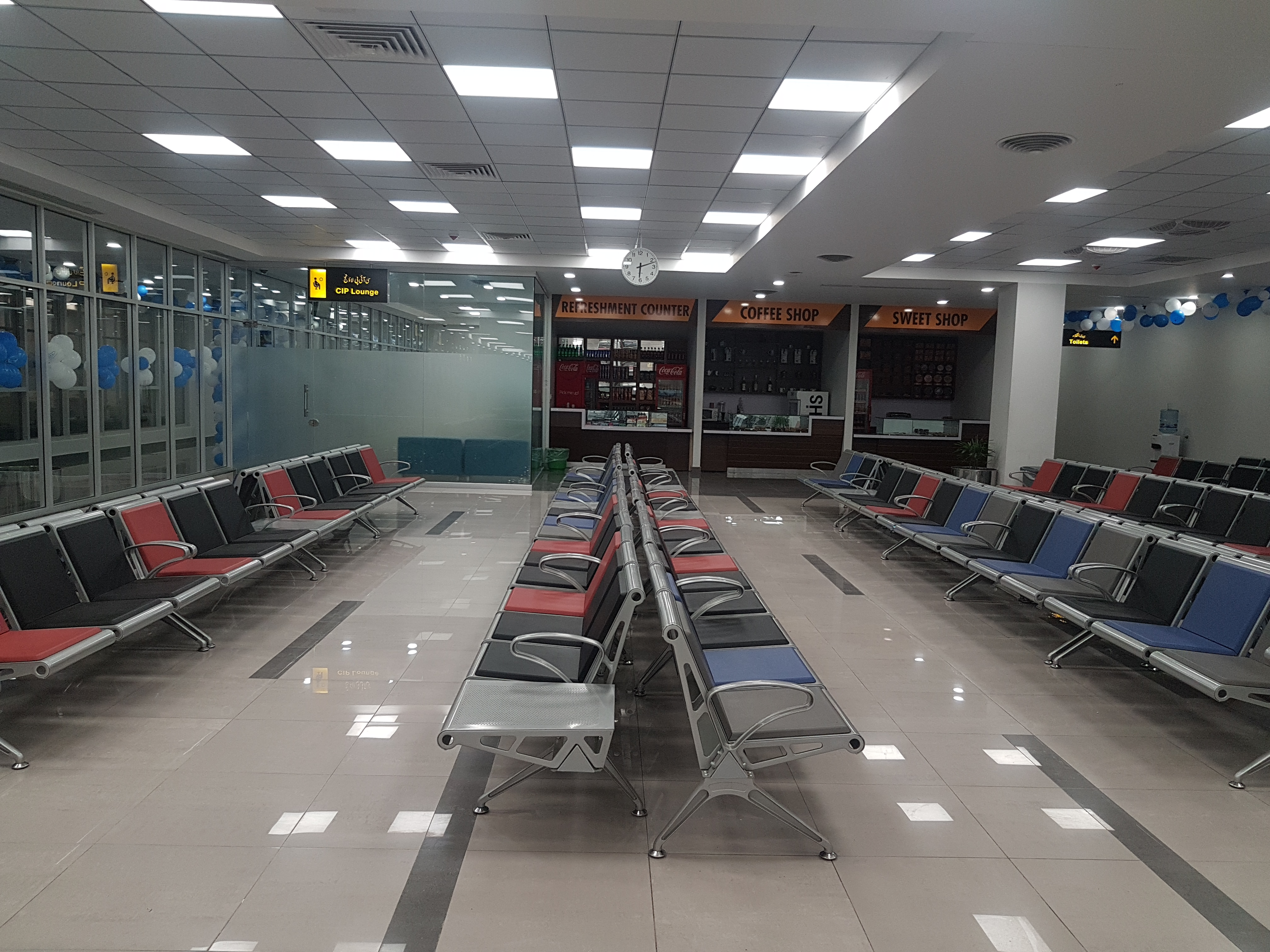
International economy holding lounge with food outlets.

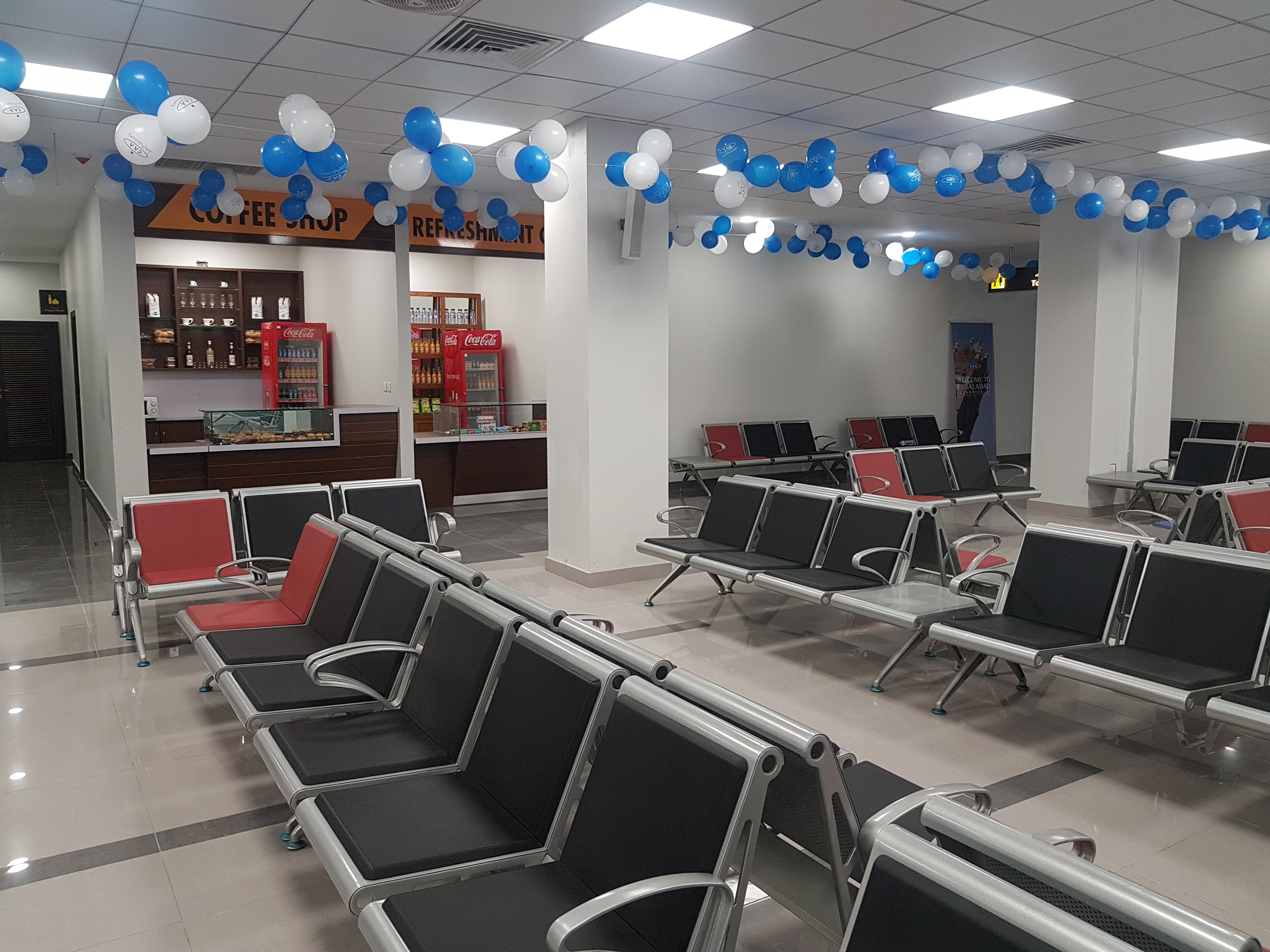
Domestic economy holding lounge with food outlets.

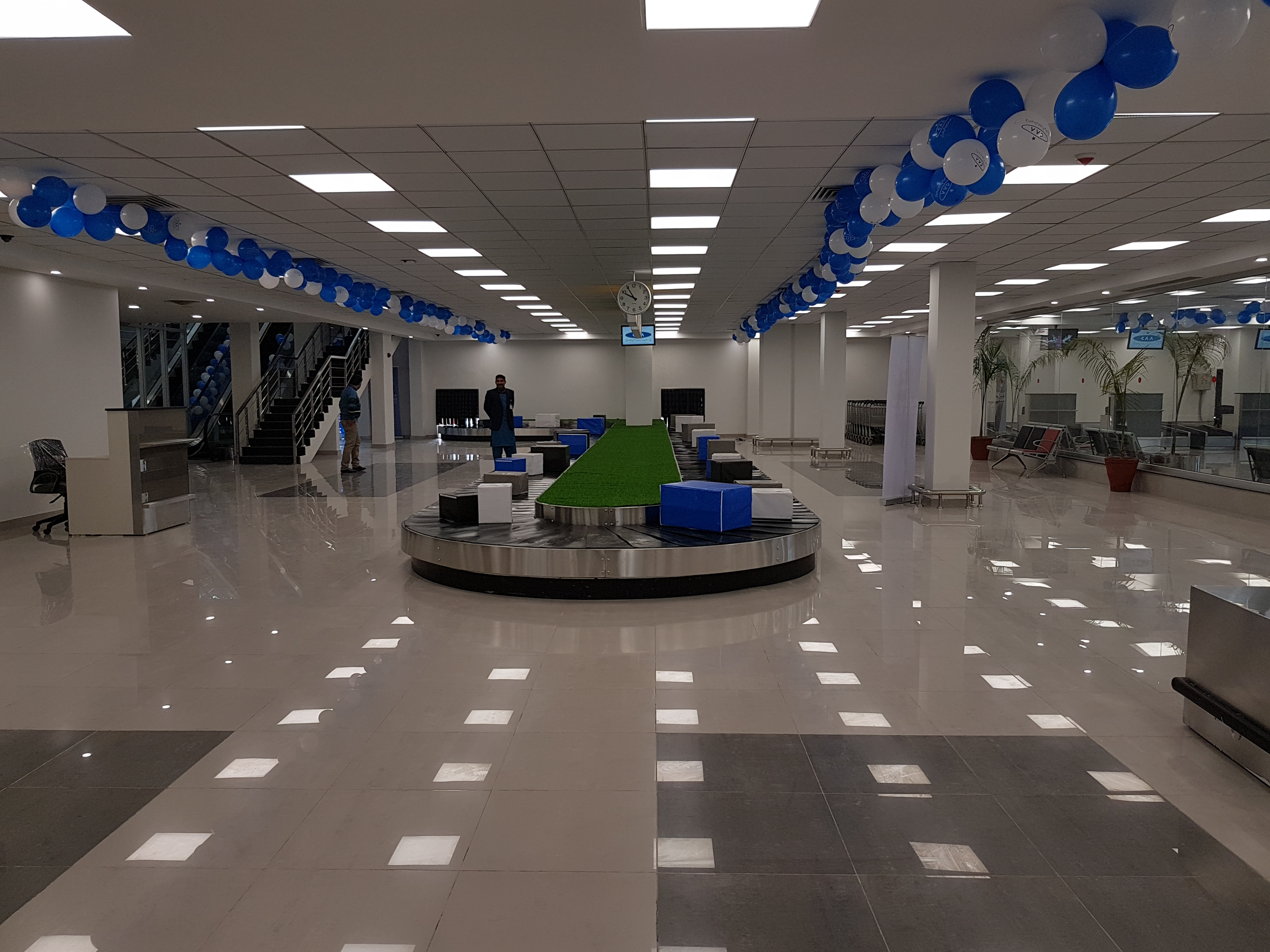
Baggage Claim.

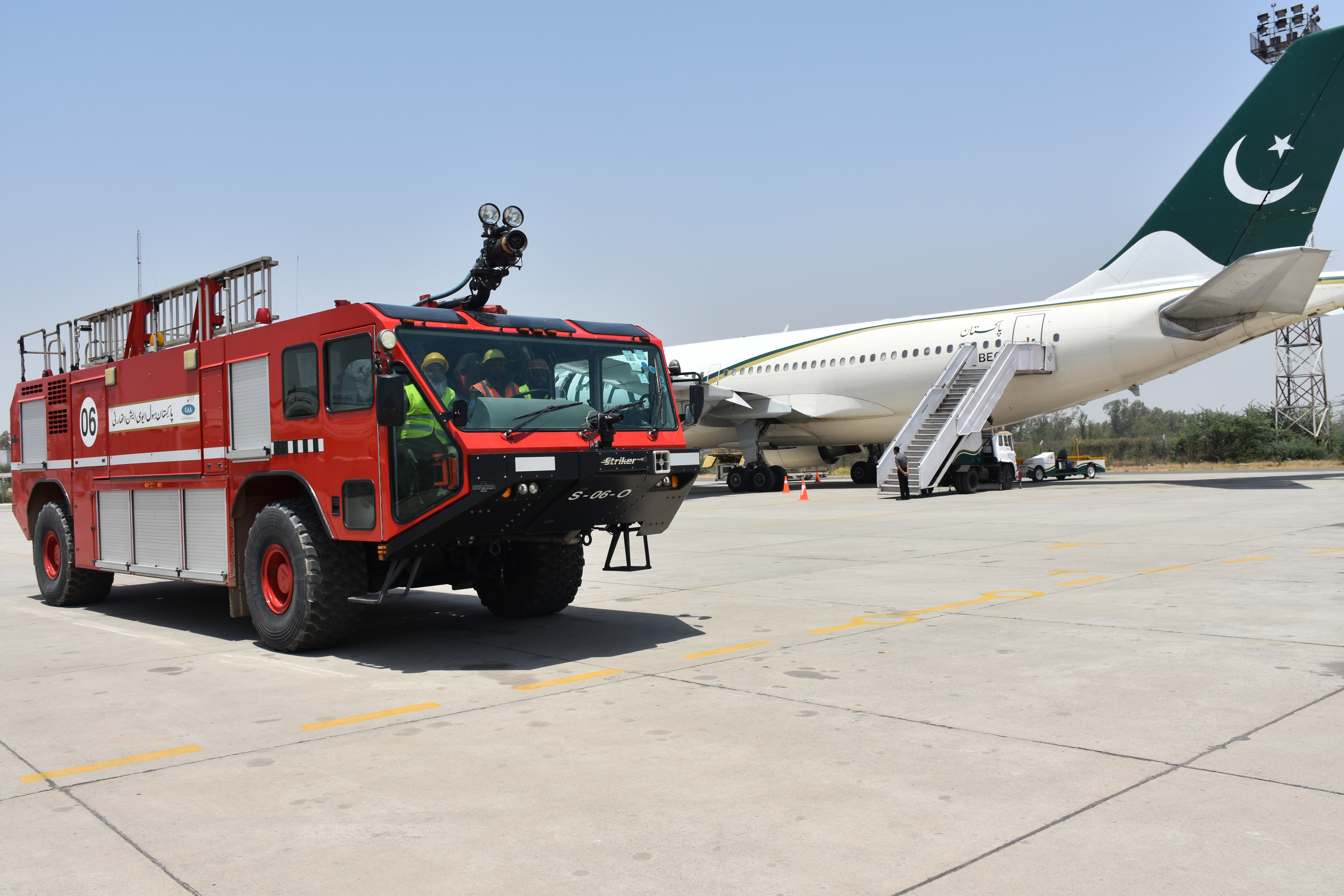

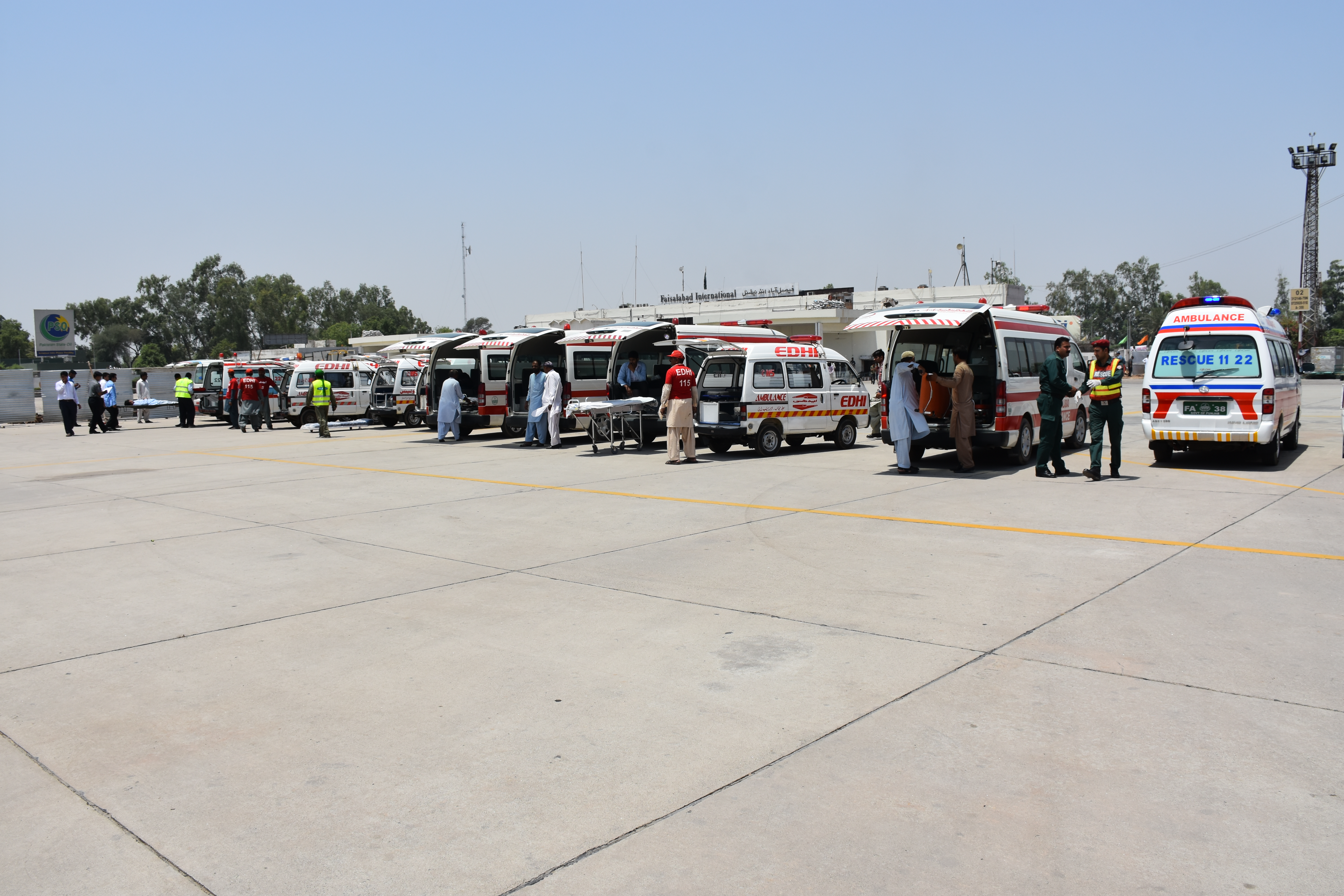
Fire fighting and Rescue Services.

LYP is fitted with all the essentials for domestic and international flights. The information below is correct as of October 2015.

Apron

- 2 passenger glass boarding bridges installed by ADELTE.
- 2 wide-body aircraft such as Airbus A300/A310/Boeing 767-300ER.
- 4 narrow body aircraft such as Airbus A320 and ATR 42/ATR 72 aircraft.
- Air field lighting System Category-I.
- Additional general aviation apron (SAFTS) for Cessna.

Runway

- 9,271 ft long ILS NDB equipped runway at an elevation of 607 feet with 25' shoulders on each side.
- Parallel runway for general aviation aircraft such as Cessna 162 and Cessna 172 (Expected to be renovated in Q2 2018).
- Capable of handling up to Boeing 767 & Airbus A300. (post renovation up to Boeing 777)
- Instrument Landing System Category-I.

Airport Services

- Pakistan State Oil provides fuel services to all airlines flying out of the airport. (Type: Jet A-100)
- Fire fighting and Rescue Services.
- FIDS systems located in the lounges and briefing concourses showing television programmes and flight information.
- Airport Mosque located outside the terminal at the far end of the car park.
- Aircraft ground maintenance services.
- CAA Porter services and luggage wrapping services are available.
- Custom and Immigration for international flights.

Ground Handling Agents

- Pakistan International Airlines.
- Royal Airport Services (RAS).
- Gerry's Dnata

Cargo Complex

- International and domestic freight services are available via Pakistan International Airlines and international airlines.
- Cargo can be booked at PIA Booking Office located in the city centre or at the airport cargo complex.
- New cargo complex being built to handle cargo aircraft loads.

Flying School Institutions

- Air Academy Private Ltd.

Additional

- Meteorology Forecasting Station.
- Standby generators 24/7 are available.
- 24-hour priority notice for unexpected arrival into the airport.
- Serena Hotels counter.
- Drop Off lane and Special Assistance Parking.
- Flight Information and Assistance Office.
- Airline Ticketing and Reservation offices (PIA, SAFTS, Gerry's dnata, Royal Airport Services).

== Operations ==
=== Runways ===
The main runway at the airport was inaugurated in 1972 which was built to handle jet aircraft such as the Boeing 737. As PIA acquired larger aircraft, the CAA decided to strengthen the runway in 1991 so the airport could handle wide body aircraft such as Airbus A300, Airbus A310 and Boeing 767-200ER. The current length of the runway is 9,272 ft × 151 ft (2,826 m × 46 m). The runway is numbered 03 Coordinates: N31°21.30' / E72°59.21', Elevation: 587 and Runway Heading: 034° whilst 21 Coordinates: N31°22.53' / E73°0.26', Elevation: 591 and Runway Heading 214°. The runway is expected to renovated in late 2015 to make it Boeing 777 compatible. The runway is inspected by the CAA Runway Inspection Team several times a day during daily operations.

The former runway was closed several years later after the opening of 03/21. The runway is not numbered as per International Civil Aviation Organization (ICAO) standards but it is parallel to the main runway. The runway has been marked with several white crosses to inform landing aircraft that the runway is no longer operational. The runway is still however used by the general aviation and military aircraft for taxiing to the main runway.

=== Control tower ===
Faisalabad airport's control tower stands at the centre of the airfield. It was built soon after the jet aircraft flights were inaugurated at the airport in 1974. Pakistan's airspace is split into two FIR regions, Karachi and Lahore. The airport falls under Lahore's Flight Information Region. Air traffic control is provided by the Civil Aviation Authority of Pakistan (CAA) and is governed by the Lahore Area Control Centre. Faisalabad Control tower provides aerodrome and approach control services to both civilian and military aircraft. Navigation aid facilities include Non Directional Beacon (NDB), Distance Measuring Equipment (DME) and Instrument Landing System (ILS) which are all in operation at the airport.

=== Maintenance ===
Line maintenance services are undertaken by Pakistan International Airlines (PIA). There are a number of general aviation and Pakistan Air Force hangars that are also located at the airport for line and base maintenance.

=== Security ===
Security is provided by Airports Security Force since its establishment in 1976. Following the incident of Pan Am Flight 73, in which a hijacking led to a fatal shootout between the perpetrators and airport security officials at Jinnah International Airport, the airport has had a "Security Action Plan" in place which is re-evaluated regularly by the ASF, Pakistan Air Force, CAA and police to check for vulnerable points and reaction times. Roads leading to the airport are also monitored by the Elite Police.

=== Cargo complex ===
In 1976, the CAA decided to build a cargo complex at the airport. The building is located on the righthand side of the passenger terminal and is used to handle goods imported and exported by air. The building is currently leased to Pakistan International Airlines. Most of the cargo is handled at the main PIA booking office in the city where it is collected and then transported to the airport. In 2015, the CAA decided to build a new cargo complex for cargo operations closer to the apron.

=== General aviation ===
The airport is home to two flying schools: Air Academy Ltd. There is an additional apron in front of the terminal (airside) which is used to park Cessna aircraft and helicopters. The new apron measures 30.4 metres by 30.4 metres which includes a debriefing room and engineering workshop.

== Airlines and destinations ==
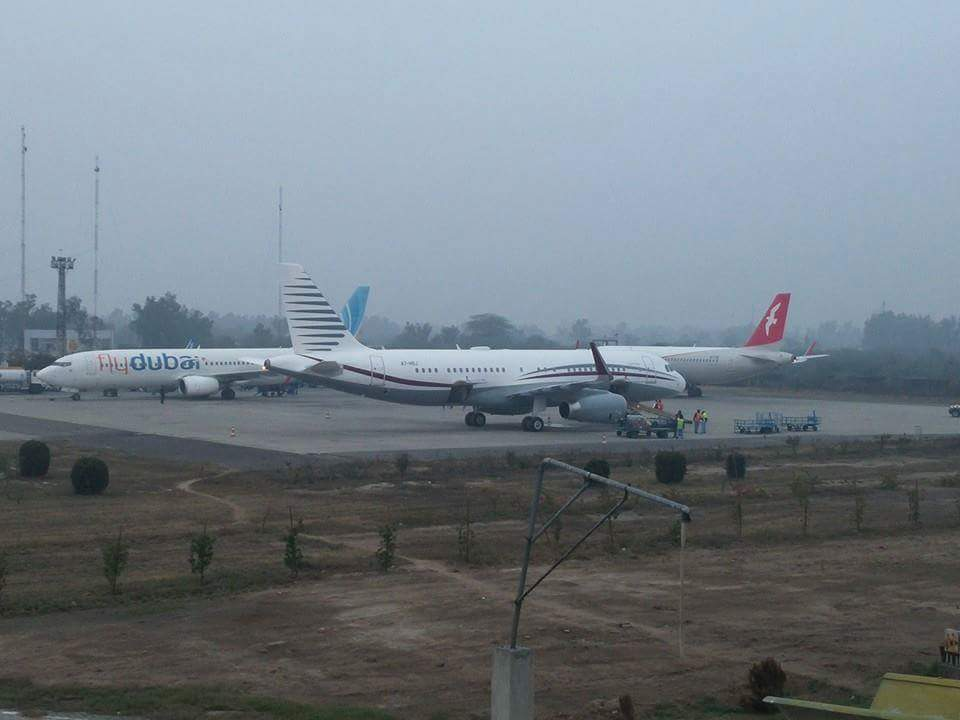
Air Arabia, flydubai and Qatar aircraft parked at remote stands.

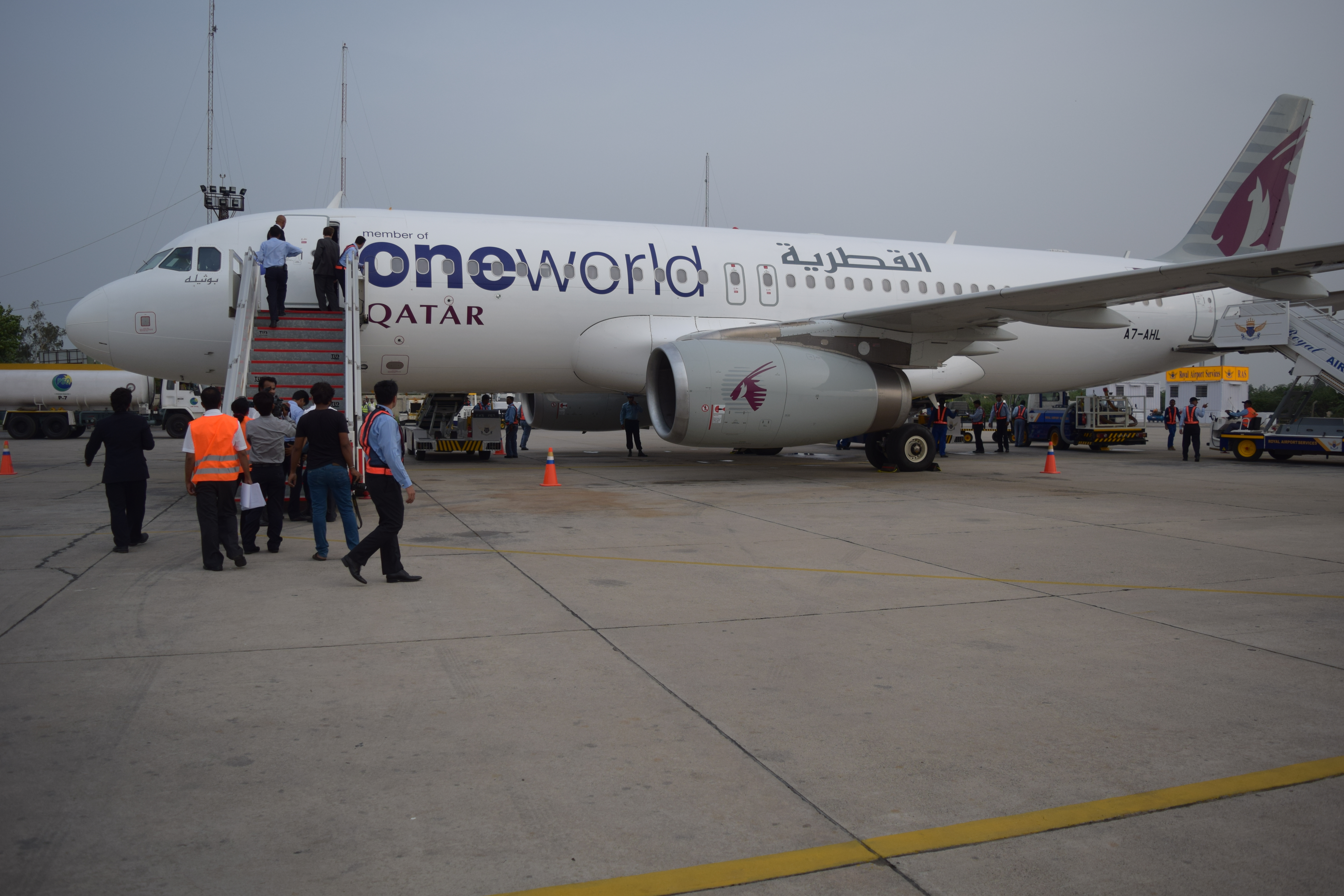
Qatar Airways Airbus A320 arrival from Doha, Qatar.

=== Passenger ===
The following airlines operate regularly scheduled passenger flights at Faisalabad International Airport:

Airline	Destinations
Air Arabia	Abu Dhabi, Sharjah
Fly Jinnah	Karachi
flydubai	Dubai–International
flynas	Jeddah
Pakistan International Airlines	Dubai–International, Jeddah, Karachi, Medina

=== Cargo ===
Airlines	Destinations
Royal Airlines Cargo	Islamabad, Karachi
Star Air Aviation	Karachi, Lahore
TCS Courier	Dubai–International, Karachi

== Access ==
=== Car ===
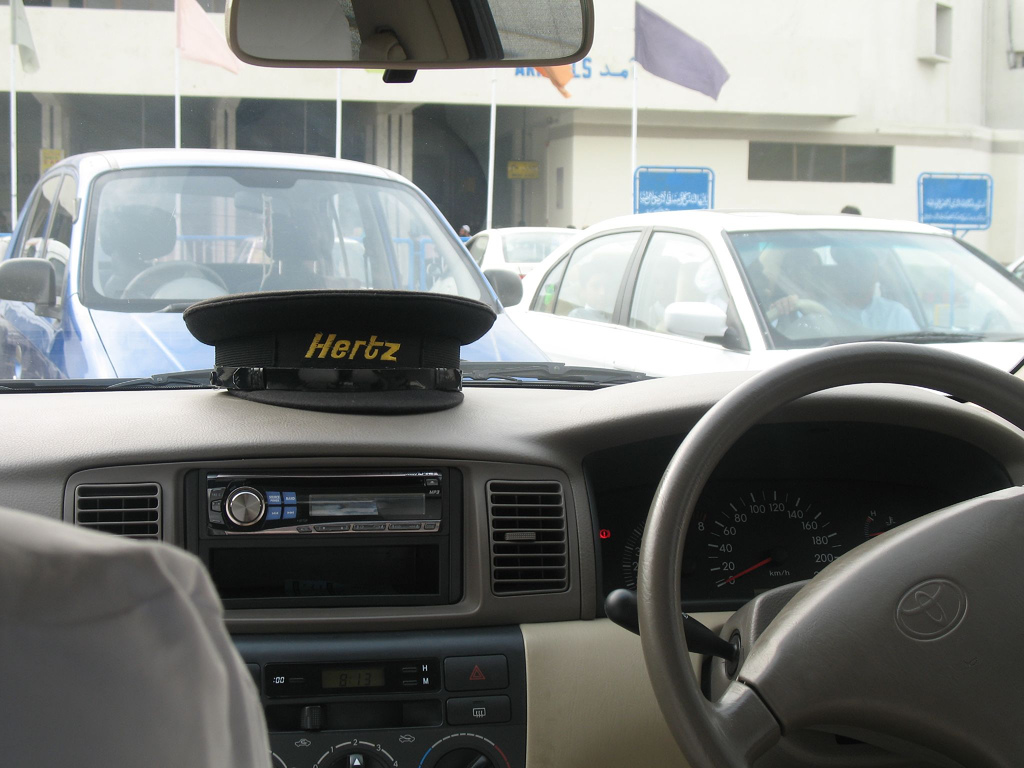
Hertz Car Rental Services

LYP is accessible by the airport approach road located just off Jhang Road, 10 km from the city centre. There is a drop off lane at the front of the terminal as well as a car park which has a capacity of 200+ cars. A tender was issued on 1 April 2015 to automate the car park to international standards.

Car rental services are also available which have to be booked online on the Hertz car rental website or by speaking to a member of staff at the Serena Hotel counter.

=== Taxi ===
Prime Cab Limited and Metro Cabs operate directly from the airport and there is a counter on the landside of the terminal building for making bookings. In partnership with Hertz, Serena Hotels, Pearl Continental offer a pick and drop service that is available from the landside terminal.

=== Bus ===
The airport can be reached from Faisalabad up to Sargodha by bus. After that, one has to take a taxi. There is an air-conditioned CNG bus service from the airport to Jhang, Toba Tek Singh, Chiniot, and Sangla Hill.

=== Train ===
The nearest railway station is Faisalabad railway station which is 24 mi (39 km) via Jhang Road from the airport. There are a number of connections from the railway station to other parts of the country. The Risalewala railway station is also located towards the south east of the airport which can be accessed via the Faisalabad Bypass.

=== Rickshaw ===
Traditional CNG powered rickshaws at the airport road entrance are quite popular amongst the local community, and are freely available at all hours.

== Traffic and statistics ==
=== Annual traffic statistics ===
The following table provides details of the major traffic flows out of Lahore in terms of passenger numbers, aircraft movements, cargo as well as mail. The results were collected by the Civil Aviation Authority of Pakistan:

Year	Aircraft movements (Commercial)	Passengers (Intl & Domestic)	Cargo handled (M. Tons)	Mail handled (M. Tons)
2004-05	2,610	182,966	1,223	27.80
2006-07	2,614	189,339	971	30.70
2007-08	2,342	185,900	896	26.265
2008-09	1,902	149,036	676	22.82
2009-10	1,832	135,310	680	8.79
2010-11	1,669	151,028	602	7.85
2011-12	1,373	135,373	479	5.15
2012-13	1,074	98,055	297	0.61
2013-14	834	82,034	198	0.61
2014-15	636	66,888	103	0.32
2015-16	2,748	186,089	59	0
2016-17	4,062	461,475	112	0
2017-18	7,707	555,938	349	5
2018-19	8,023	360,524	390	0

== Awards and recognition ==
- Anna.aero, a leading airline network news and analysis website, awarded Faisalabad airport for producing the best Arch of Triumph, more commonly known as a water salute, on 10 July 2015 on the inaugural FlyDubai flight from Dubai International Airport.
- Analysing the data from August 2014 to August 2015, Anna.aero ranked Faisalabad having the second largest growth rate in the country after Multan.
- On 10 February 2008, Captain Ayesha Rabia became the first woman in Pakistan to command a scheduled passenger flight of a Boeing 737. Her first flight was a PIA PK340 from Karachi-Faisalabad and PK341 Faisalabad-Karachi route.

== Incidents and accidents ==
- On 24th Feb 2017 a CESSNA-162 Aircraft crashed, On 24 February 2017 Cessna-162 Reg. No. AP-ZBQ was on a routine training flight at Faisalabad airport. The aircraft had seating capacity of two and carried Instructor on the right seat along with Student Pilot on the left seat. The Instructor Pilot was Chief Flying Instructor, Shaheen Air Flying Training School (SAFTS) whereas student pilot had completed Private Pilot License (PPL) training and was flying PPL initial issue check in the mishap flight. The Instructor Pilot had flown 3 hrs instructional / training flight on the mishap aircraft on the same day prior to accident flight. According to available evidence, the start up, taxi out and line up on runway 03 were normal. The crew obtained takeoff clearance after performing necessary checks and aircraft rolled for takeoff at 0738 UTC. The mishap aircraft climbed to 575 feet above ground level and developed some engine problem leading to loss of power. There was no call exchanged during the event and aircraft was observed turning right for landing back on the runway. During this turn, the aircraft went into a steep dive and impacted ground in a steep nose low attitude. Recorded data indicated that just before the impact, the engine had picked up to full power. Both occupants sustained fatal injuries.
- On 28 May 1973, a Pakistan International Airlines Fokker F-27 Friendship crashed after striking trees 800m short of the runway. All passengers and crew survived the crash, however, the aircraft was written off since it was damaged beyond repair.
- On 20 April 2012, a Pakistan International Airlines Boeing 737-300 was taking off from the airport when it needed to shut down an engine. The aircraft diverted to Lahore where the aircraft landed safely.

== See also ==
- List of airports in Pakistan
- List of airlines of Pakistan
- Transport in Pakistan
