= Choa Rajgan =

Karyala Rajgan کریالہ راجگان
- Village
- Location in Punjab (Pakistan) Karyala Rajgan (Pakistan)
- Coordinates: 32°54′N 73°45′E
- Country: Pakistan
- Province: Punjab
- District: Gujrat
- Time zone: PST

Choa Rajgan (Punjabi, Urdu: کریالہ راجگان) is a village of Gujrat District, Punjab, Pakistan in Sarai Alamgir Tehsil. The population is more than 2,000. It is one of the biggest villages of Chib Rajputs. The majority of the inhabitants belong to the Chib Rajput caste, hence the village name.

The shrine of religious historical figure Baba Sain Alif is in Karyala Rajgan.

== Literacy ==
About 50 percent people of the Choa Rajgan village are literate. There are two schools in the village one for boys and other one for girls, Both schools are primary schools (Up to 5 class). The inhabitants of this village take further education from nearby town Sarai Alamgir.

== Location ==
Choa Rajgan is 6 km away from the large town of Sarai Alamgir Town is surrounded by hilly areas locally called as "Pabbi". An old well is considered to be the center of the village which is called "Khhu" in local language.

The village is just 4 km from historic Grand Trunk Road. The nearest airport is Sialkot International Airport which is around 98 km from village and takes roughly one and half hours.
