= SereneAir =

Airline of Pakistan

SereneAir (Pvt.) Limited

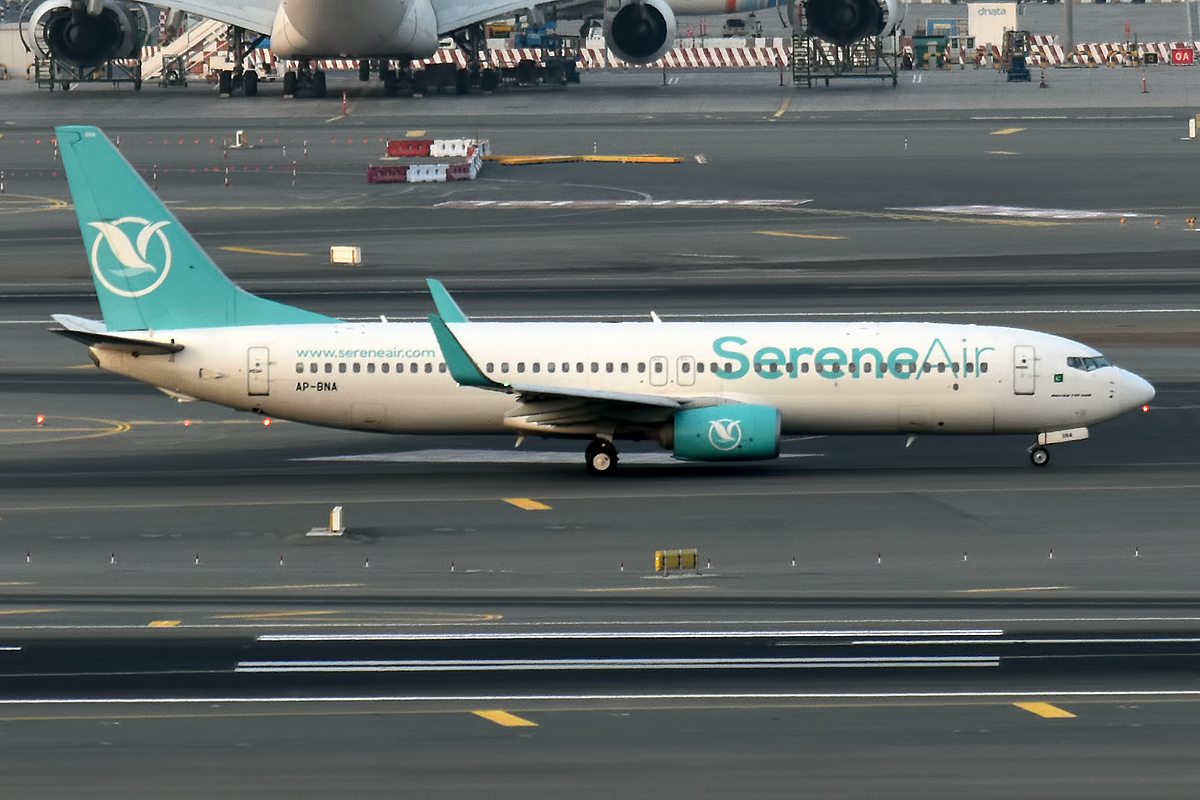
- SereneAir B737-800
| IATA | ICAO | Call sign |
|---|---|---|
| ER | SEP | SERENE |
- Founded: May 2016; 10 years ago
- Commenced operations: 29 January 2017; 9 years ago
- AOC #: AOC-031/16-AL; AOC-032/17-CH
- Operating bases: Islamabad International Airport; Jinnah International Airport, Karachi; Allama Iqbal International Airport, Lahore; Quetta International Airport
- Fleet size: 7
- Destinations: 12
- Headquarters: Islamabad, Pakistan
- Key people: Dr. Yunchun Yang (CEO)
- Website: www.sereneair.com

SereneAir (Urdu: سیرین ایئر) is a privately owned Pakistani airline that began operating services in January 2017. SereneAir operated scheduled domestic flights within Pakistan. Its first international flight departed for Sharjah, United Arab Emirates on 16 March 2021. Since October 2, 2025, the airline's operations have been suspended due to a lack of airworthy aircraft. This resulted in the temporary suspension of its Air Operator Certificate by the Pakistan Civil Aviation Authority which was eventually restored in late November 2025, though flight operations remain suspended.

== History ==
The Pakistan Civil Aviation Authority (PCAA) granted a license in March 2016 that permitted the establishment of SereneAir. The airline received its first aircraft, a Boeing 737-800, in November 2016. The airline started operations on 29 January 2017, a week after obtaining its air operator's certificate (AOC). The inaugural flight departed Islamabad for Karachi on 29 January 2017. Serene Air took delivery of their first Airbus A330-200 on 27 August 2020.

On 2 October 2025, PCAA suspended the AOC for the airline's failure to comply with the requirement of a minimum of five serviceable aircraft. At the time of suspension, Serene Air had zero operational aircraft and was therefore unable to operate any flights. PCAA eventually restored the certificate in late November 2025 but the flight operations will remain suspended until the airline fully complies with all safety and regulatory conditions.

== Destinations ==
As of December 2025, SereneAir flies to the following destinations:

| Country | City | Airport | Status |
|---|---|---|---|
| China | Beijing | Beijing Daxing International Airport | |
| Pakistan | Faisalabad | Faisalabad International Airport | |
| Pakistan | Islamabad | Islamabad International Airport | Hub |
| Pakistan | Karachi | Jinnah International Airport | Base |
| Pakistan | Lahore | Allama Iqbal International Airport | Base |
| Pakistan | Peshawar | Bacha Khan International Airport | |
| Pakistan | Quetta | Quetta International Airport | Base |
| Saudi Arabia | Jeddah | King Abdulaziz International Airport | |
| Saudi Arabia | Medina | Prince Mohammad bin Abdulaziz International Airport | Seasonal |
| Saudi Arabia | Riyadh | King Khalid International Airport | |
| United Arab Emirates | Dubai | Dubai International Airport | |
| United Arab Emirates | Sharjah | Sharjah International Airport | |

== Fleet ==
As of December 2025, SereneAir operates the following aircraft:

Serene Air fleet
| Aircraft | In service | Orders | Notes |
|---|---|---|---|
| Airbus A330-200 | 3 | — | |
| Boeing 737-800 | 4 | — | |

== Accidents and incidents ==
- On April 5, 2021, an Airbus A330-200 (registered AP-BNE), en route from Karachi to Islamabad with 120 people on board, was flying at FL370 approximately 220 nautical miles northeast of Karachi when the pilot received an engine stall indication and subsequently shut down the engine. The flight was diverted back to Karachi, where it safely landed on runway 25L at Jinnah International Airport, about 40 minutes after exiting FL370.
- On December 2, 2021, an Airbus A330-200 (registered AP-BNG), operating a regional flight from Karachi to Islamabad was on approach to Islamabad's runway 28L when a bird impacted the landing gear of the airplane. The airplane landed safely.
- On October 8, 2023, an Airbus A330-200 (registered AP-BNE), flying from Islamabad (Pakistan) to Jeddah (Saudi Arabia) with more than 309 Umrah pilgrims on board, was en route about 280 NM north of Karachi (Pakistan) when the crew initiated an emergency descent due to the loss of cabin pressure. The aircraft diverted to Karachi for a safe landing about one hour after the depressurization.

== See also ==
- Pakistan International Airlines
- FlyJinnah
- AirSial
- airblue
