= Quetta International Airport =

International airport serving Quetta, Pakistan

Quetta International Airport کوئٹہ بین الاقوامی ہوائی اڈا د کوټې نړیوال هوايي ډګر کویٹه میان‌استمانی بالی پٹّ فرودگاه بین‌المللی کویته
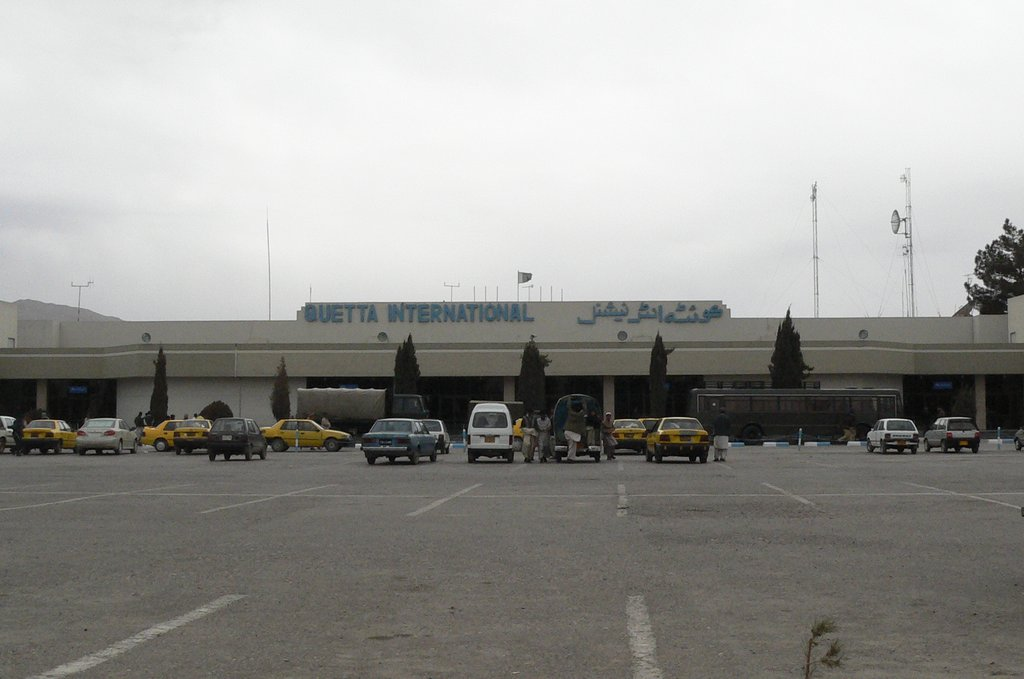

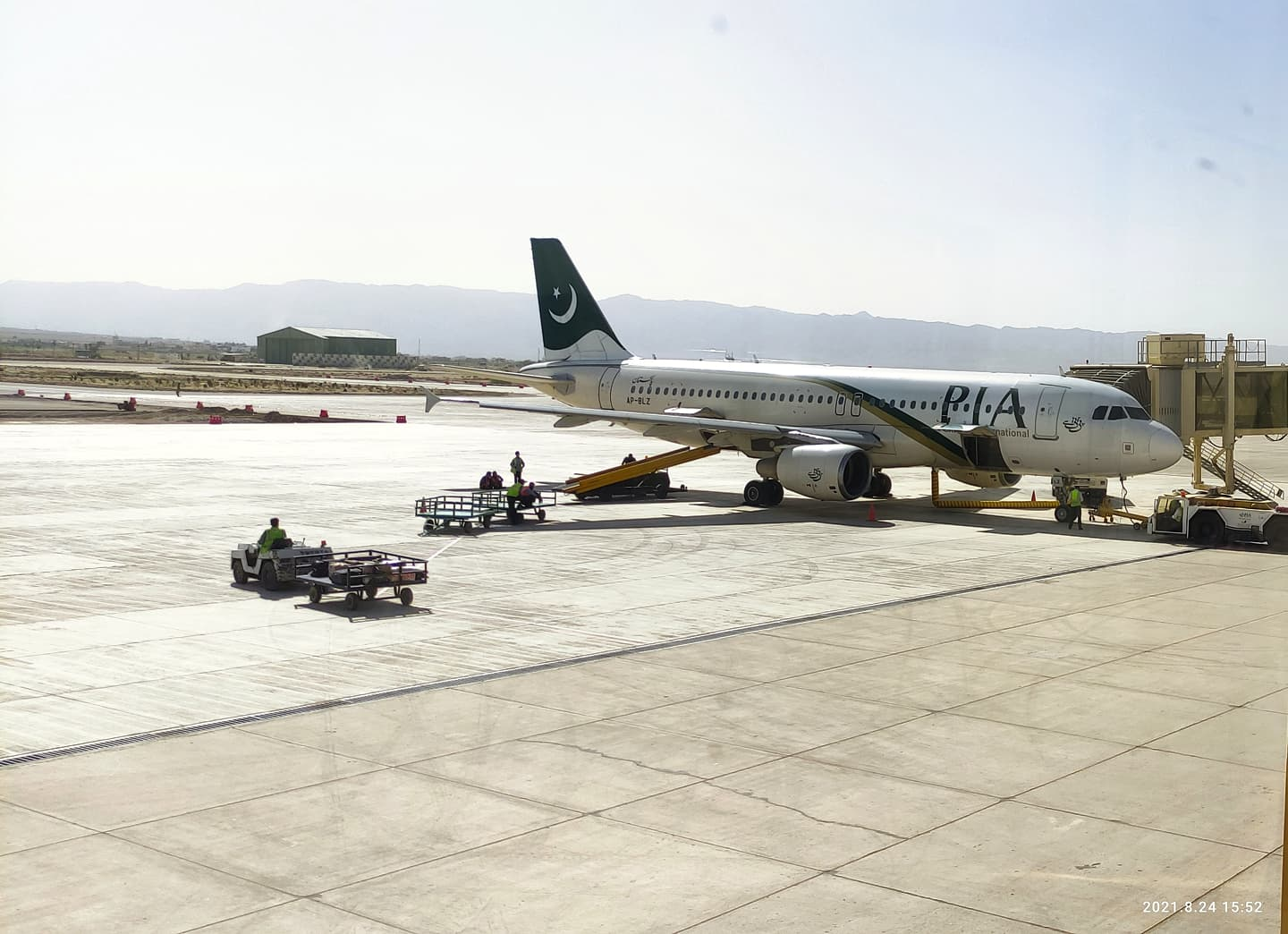
- IATA: UET; ICAO: OPQT

Summary
- Airport type: Public
- Owner/Operator: Pakistan Airports Authority
- Serves: Quetta
- Location: Samungli, Quetta-87650, Balochistan, Pakistan
- Opened: 1947; 79 years ago
- Operating base for: SereneAir
- Elevation AMSL: 5,267 ft (1,605 m)
- Coordinates: 30°14′24″N 66°56′24″E
- Website: www.quettainternational.com
- Interactive map of Quetta International Airport

Runways
Direction	Length		Surface
Direction	m	ft	Surface
13L/31R	3,646	11,962	Concrete
13R/31L	3,658	12,001	Asphalt

Statistics (July 2024 – June 2025)
- Passengers: 535,065 ▲25.33%
- Aircraft movements: 3,944 ▲15.42%
- Cargo handled: 2,056 metric tons ▲113.49%
- Source: Statistics from the Pakistan Civil Aviation Authority

Quetta International Airport (Urdu کوئٹہ بین الاقوامی ہوائی اڈا) (Balochi: کویٹه میان‌استمانی بالی پٹّ); (IATA: UET, ICAO: OPQT) is an international airport located at Quetta, the provincial capital of Balochistan, Pakistan. It is the second largest airport in the south region of the country and the second largest for the province of Balochistan. It is situated 12 km south-west of the city, spread over an area of 14 hectares (35 acres). Average scheduled flights were 1332, non-scheduled flights 247, and the total recorded passenger flow was 152,698 in 2007.

== History ==
The airport is linked to local cities as well as central hubs domestically by several airlines. International services are at present carried out by the national flag carrier, Pakistan International Airlines (PIA), flydubai, and Air Arabia, although the city has also been served by regional carriers like Iran Aseman Airlines and Ariana Afghan Airlines in the past.

The airport like many airports in pre-independence days were mainly a small airstrip offering air operations on behalf of the British Empire. After independence, the national flag carrier of Pakistan launched Karachi-Quetta-Lahore flights in 1954. This led to the development of a new runway that was constructed by a French company in 1958. Fokker F-27 Friendship flights initiated in 1964. This meant a new apron had to be constructed to deal with this larger turboprop aircraft in 1968. Due to the growth of the airport and number of passengers travelling through it, PIA launched Boeing flights from the airport in 1972. The first international flight was launched in 1977. The revenue the airport generated allowed the construction of the terminal building in 1982. A new control tower was built between 1982 and 1983. Navigational aids Precision Approach Path Indicators and Doppler Very High Frequency Omnidirectional Range (DVOR) were installed in 1984. The main concourse hall was inaugurated in 2001 to accommodate a great influx of passengers and families that came to see off their relatives. Airblue and Shaheen Air International operated flights from Quetta, however due to more lucrative opportunities decided to withdraw.

== Structure ==
Quetta International Airport is the largest airport in the province of Balochistan. The airport is currently under evaluation to being upgraded to make it compatible with future needs of the geographical location. The CAA is currently working with the provincial government to develop the airport to meet international standards. The terminal building consists of the concourse hall, briefing hall, domestic and International arrival and two lounges on the first floor for domestic and international departures. The aerodrome category for fire fighting is CAT 8. It has an annual capacity of 250,000 passengers and is growing. The airport has several facilities to handle the normal needs of passengers such as telephone calling booths (domestic and international), money exchange facilities, automated teller machines hosted by Bank Alfalah and Habib Bank Limited, Internet stations powered by Wateen, information counters, gifts and souvenir shops, snack shops, rent-a-car services, and a full-service post office. In 2007, the CAA of Pakistan allocated a Rs 270m budget for the upgrading work on the airport.

At present, the following technical features are available at the airport:

- Lounges
  - Two lounges each for domestic and international operations
  - One CIP Premium Lounge for premium passengers or VIP diplomats
- Apron
  - Aircraft parking capacity is available for two wide body aircraft such as an A300 and three narrow body or prop aircraft such as Fokker or Airbus A319 at one time.
- Runway
  - 3,658-metre-long (12,001 ft) runway with the ability to handle a weight of one wide-body aircraft such as the A-300.
- Additional
  - Shell Aviation Ltd carry out the re-fuelling of aircraft under an exclusive licence.
  - New taxiways have been fully constructed and the tarmac reinforced to handle larger aircraft.
  - Aircraft maintenance is very low at this airport, as it is not a hub for any air carrier.
  - Heated storage, livestock handling, and customs-bonded security for valuable cargo is handled at this airport.

== Airlines and destinations ==
Airlines	Destinations
Air Arabia	Sharjah
Airblue	Islamabad, Lahore
AirSial	Karachi
Fly Jinnah	Islamabad, Karachi, Lahore
Flydubai	Dubai–International
Iran Air	Mashhad, Zahedan
Pakistan International Airlines	Islamabad, Jeddah, Karachi, Lahore
Serene Air	Islamabad, Lahore (all suspended)
South Air	Turbat, Karachi

== See also ==
- List of airlines of Pakistan
- List of airports in Pakistan
- Pakistan Civil Aviation Authority
- Transport in Pakistan
