= AirSial =

Pakistani airline

AirSial Limited
IATA	ICAO	Call sign
PF	SIF	AIR SIAL
- Founded: October 2017; 9 years ago
- Commenced operations: 25 December 2020; 5 years ago
- Hubs: Sialkot International Airport
- Focus cities: Karachi, Lahore, Islamabad, Jeddah, Muscat
- Fleet size: 12
- Destinations: 16
- Parent company: AirSial Limited
- Traded as: Air Sial Limited
- Key people: Fazal Jilani, Chairman; Ameen Ahsan, CEO
- Website: www.airsial.com

AirSial (Urdu: ایئر سیال) is a Pakistani private airline based in Sialkot, inaugurated on 9 December 2020. Air Sial had its first domestic flight on 25 December 2020, and started flying internationally, with King Abdulaziz International Airport, Jeddah as its first destination, on 29 March 2023. International operations were extended to Muscat in Oman from June 2023 and to Dubai International Airport in Dubai, United Arab Emirates in June 2025.

== History ==
AirSial was launched by the Sialkot Chamber of Commerce and Industry to improve air travel to and from the Sialkot region, which is a major industrial city in the province of Punjab. The airline initially served domestic destinations within Pakistan from its operational hub at Sialkot International Airport using a fleet of 3 Airbus A320 aircraft, flying to other major airports within Pakistan. AirSial plans to further expand to destinations within the Middle East. On 14 April 2016 the company Air Sial formally started the registration of directors of "Airsial" under the supervision of the Sialkot Chamber of Commerce and Industry (SCCI). Fazal Jillani took over as the patron-in-chief of the project. At the time Mr Jilani said, "he hoped that the new airline would begin its operation by the end of the current year (2018)". He also said that Air Sial's management would prefer to buy Boeing 737-800 aircraft for its domestic and international flight operations.

Later in June 2016, Mr Fazal Jillani said that "as many as 35 leading Overseas Pakistani investors have shown a keen interest in investing in the grand project of "Air Sial" airline." The airline was registered by the Security Exchange Commission of Pakistan (SECP) as "Air Sial Limited" company.

In December 2016 Air Sial submitted its Regular Public Transport (RPT) request to the Pakistan Civil Aviation Authority (CAA). On 27 October 2017 the Minister for Parliamentary Affairs Shaikh Aftab, who was replying on behalf of the Minister for Aviation, said that a licence was granted to Air Sial Limited last month to start operations in Pakistan. According to Fazal Jillani, the license was received in the first week of October 2017. In the same interview, he said that "Air Sial shall take to air in May-June, 2018". In May 2018 Mr Jillani again gave a new date for the launch of operations. This time he said that "all the operational arrangements have been completed to ensure the early start of the airline before the end of this year (2018)". In December 2018 Prime Minister Imran Khan approved the operations of Air Sial. However, the airline did not launch its operations in December 2018. The launch plan was postponed to the first quarter of 2019 which was further delayed.

== Launching airline operations ==
In August 2019, Air Sial's board of directors approved the lease agreement with Irish leasing giant Aercap to acquire 3 Airbus A320 aircraft. On 6 August 2019, Air Sial Executive Board Chairman Fazal Jillani and CEO Ameen Ahsan signed an agreement with Aercap representatives. The airline's website became operational in September 2020. Throughout the year the airline continued hiring. The airline received its first 3 Airbus A320s registered in Pakistan as AP-BOA, AP-BOB and AP-BOC in November 2020 with the first Airbus A320, AP-BOA arriving at Karachi's Jinnah International Airport on 29 November. The second Airbus A320, AP-BOB arrived on 5 December 2020 at Sialkot International Airport. On 11 December 2020, the third aircraft, AP-BOC arrived at Karachi's Jinnah International Airport.

On 9 December 2020, Prime Minister Imran Khan inaugurated AirSial at Sialkot International Airport. This was not the launch of operations. Prominent Pakistani fashion designer Nomi Ansari designed Air Sial's crew uniforms. The airline's inaugural scheduled passenger flight operated on 25 December, with daily Airbus A320 flights between Karachi and Islamabad, as well as between Karachi and Lahore. The first flight was PF121 to Islamabad, which departed from Karachi early in the morning on 25 December.

Starting from 2 June 2025, the airline announced it would operate nine weekly flights to Dubai—seven from Islamabad and two from Lahore. This move signaled the beginning of AirSial's global expansion efforts, which were long been anticipated.

== Destinations ==
AirSial operates flights to the following airports:

Country	City	Airport	Status
Oman	Muscat	Muscat International Airport	
Pakistan	Islamabad	Islamabad International Airport	
Pakistan	Karachi	Jinnah International Airport	Focus city
Pakistan	Lahore	Allama Iqbal International Airport	
Pakistan	Peshawar	Bacha Khan International Airport	
Pakistan	Sialkot	Sialkot International Airport	Hub
Pakistan	Skardu	Skardu International Airport	
Pakistan	Sukkur	Sukkur Airport	
Pakistan	Multan	Multan International Airport	
Saudi Arabia	Jeddah	King Abdulaziz International Airport	
Saudi Arabia	Riyadh	King Khalid International Airport	
Saudi Arabia	Madinah	Prince Mohammad Bin AbdulAziz International Airport	Seasonal
Saudi Arabia	Dammam	King Fahd International Airport	
United Arab Emirates	Abu Dhabi	Zayed International Airport	
United Arab Emirates	Dubai	Dubai International Airport	

== Fleet ==
=== Current fleet ===
As of September 2026, AirSial operates the following aircraft:

AirSial Fleet
Aircraft	In service	Orders	Notes
Airbus A320-200	12		
Airbus A320neo	0	2	To be delivered by 2028

=== Former fleet ===
AirSial Former Fleet
Aircraft	Quantity	Notes
Airbus A330-200	1	Wet leased
Boeing 737 800	1	Wet leased

=== Fleet development ===
AirSial initially signed an agreement to lease three Airbus A320-200 aircraft from AerCap.

On 30 March 2022, AirSial announced an agreement with BOC Aviation for two more Airbus A320-200 aircraft on lease.

In 2024, AirSial leased a 737-800 from Tailwind Airlines. It was returned to them in 2025.

In November 2025, AirSial wet-leased an Airbus A330-200 from Maltese charter airline called Hi Fly Malta. The aircraft was later returned to HiFly Malta.

In early September 2025, AirSial signed another agreement with Dubai-based lessor Dubai Aerospace Enterprise for another two A320-200 aircraft.

== Interior ==
Each Airbus A320 is fitted with a basic 3x3 layout in an all economy configuration, and has 180 seats.

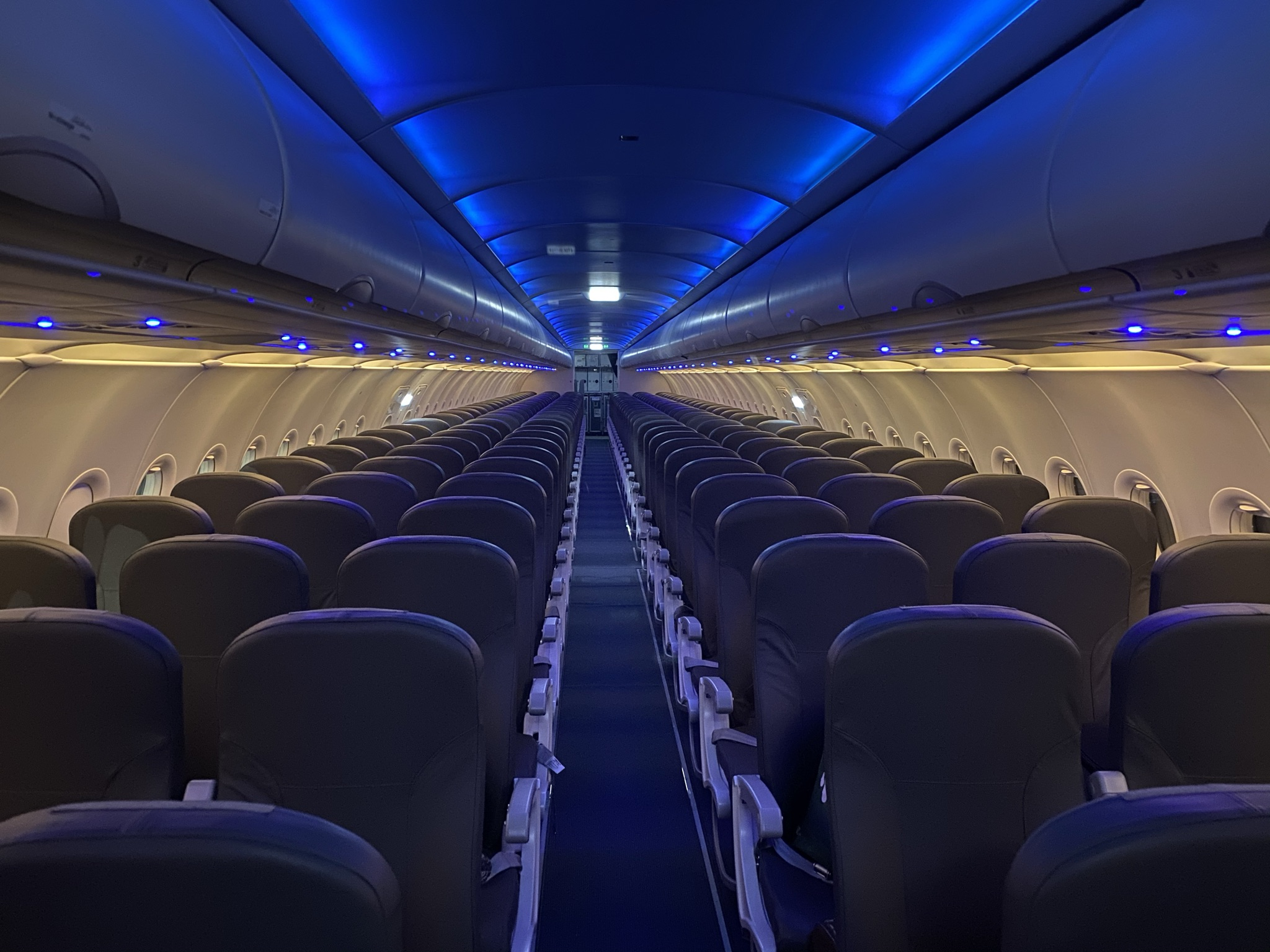
AirSial Airbus A320 All Economy 3x3 Front to Rear

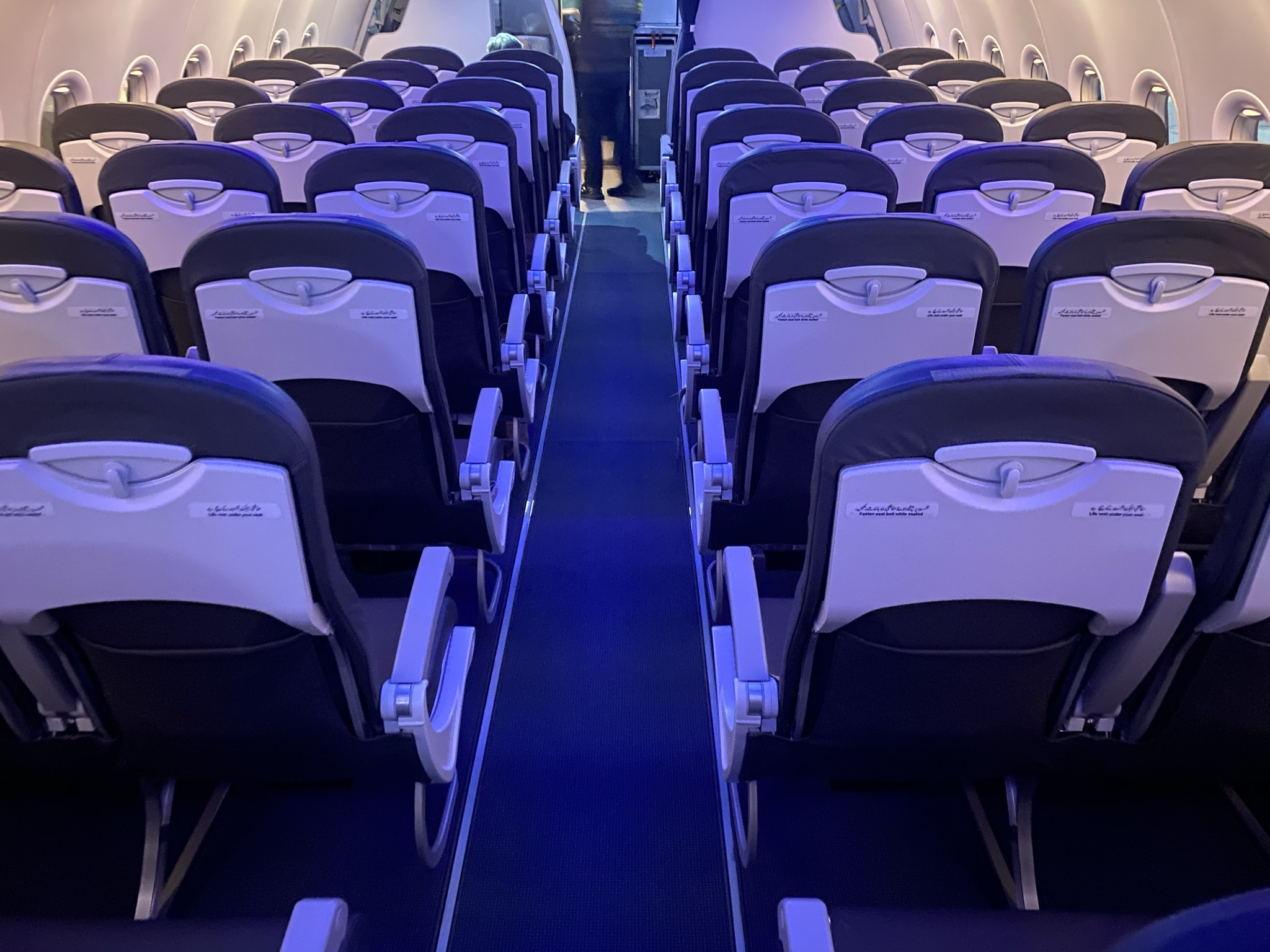
AirSial Interior 3x3 All economy Rear to Front (No IFE)

== See also ==
- Airblue
- SereneAir
- Fly Jinnah
