= South Air =

Pakistani regional airline, founded 2025

IATA	ICAO	Call sign
Z8	SQB	—
- Founded: 2025
- Commenced operations: November 2025
- Hubs: Jinnah International Airport, Islamabad International Airport
- Fleet size: 2
- Destinations: 11
- Parent company: SOS Group
- Headquarters: Karachi, Pakistan
- Website: southair.com.pk

South Air (Pvt.) Limited is a Pakistani private regional airline headquartered in Karachi, operating under the Tourism Promotion and Regional Integration (TPRI) licensing framework of the Pakistan Civil Aviation Authority (PCAA).

== History ==
Pakistan's Civil Aviation Authority introduced the TPRI licence category under the National Aviation Policy 2019 to encourage private-sector entry into regional air travel markets not served by existing scheduled carriers. South Air obtained a TPRI licence from the PCAA and an Air Operator Certificate (AOC), and has separately applied for a Regular Public Transport (RPT) licence. The airline is backed by SOS Group.

South Air was formally inaugurated on 24 November 2025 at a ceremony in Multan attended by Syed Yusuf Raza Gilani, then Senate Chairman and Acting President of Pakistan. At the ceremony, partnership agreements were signed with Pakistan International Airlines for maintenance, repair, and overhaul services and with Pakistan State Oil for fuelling.

In May 2026, South Air received its first aircraft, an ATR 72-500 leased from Jump Air registered as LY-JUA. In the same month, South Air received their second ATR 72-600 from Manta Air registered as 8Q-RAY.

In May 2026, South Air conducted trial flights ahead of the planned expansion of scheduled services, operating proving flights to Gwadar and Quetta.

== Operations ==
South Air's network covers Karachi, Bahawalpur, Gwadar, Rahim Yar Khan, Panjgur, Turbat, Quetta, Zhob, Sukkur, Multan, Islamabad with Skardu and Gilgit also listed as a planned destination. Planned routes to northern Pakistan include two daily services to Gilgit, Chitral, and Skardu, operating initially from Islamabad and Lahore.

Nishat Fatima is Chief Executive Officer and Ejaz Mahmood Malik, a retired Air Vice Marshal of the Pakistan Air Force, is Chief Operating Officer. The airline's own account of its inauguration described Fatima as the first woman in Pakistan to lead an airline.

== Destinations ==
As of July 2026, South Air flies to the following destinations:

Country	City	Airport	Notes	Refs
Pakistan	Rahim Yar Khan	Rahim Yar Khan International Airport		
Pakistan	Islamabad	Islamabad International Airport	Hub	
Pakistan	Karachi	Jinnah International Airport	Hub	
Pakistan	Bahawalpur	Bahawalpur Airport		
Pakistan	Quetta	Quetta International Airport		
Pakistan	Turbat	Turbat Airport		
Pakistan	Sukkur	Sukkur International Airport		
Pakistan	Gwadar	New Gwadar International Airport		
Pakistan	Multan	Multan International Airport		
Pakistan	Lahore	Allama Iqbal International Airport		
Pakistan	Peshawar	Bacha Khan International Airport		

== Fleet ==
The South Air fleet as of June 2026 consists of the following aircraft:

Aircraft	In Service	Orders	Reg.	Notes
ATR 72-500	1	0	LY-JUA	Wet leased from Jump Air.
ATR 72-600	1	0	8Q-RAY	Wet leased from Manta Air.
ATR 42	-	1	-	Planned
