= Allama Iqbal International Airport =

Airport serving Lahore, Pakistan

Allama Iqbal International Airport علامہ اقبال بین الاقوامی ہوائی اڈه
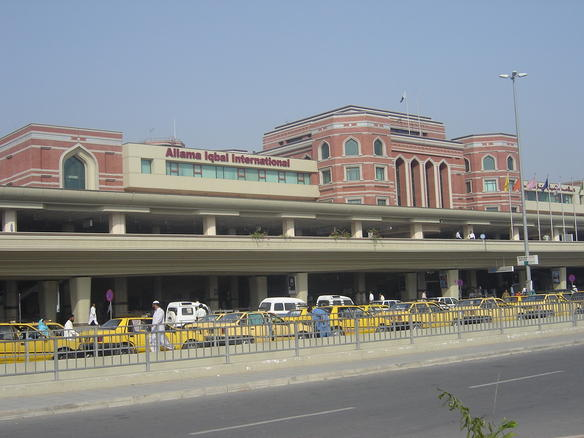
- IATA: LHE; ICAO: OPLA

Summary
- Airport type: Public
- Operator: Pakistan Civil Aviation Authority
- Serves: Lahore
- Location: Lahore-54810, Punjab, Pakistan
- Opened: 1962; 64 years ago
- Hub for: Pakistan International Airlines
- Operating base for: SereneAir
- Elevation AMSL: 213 m (699 ft)
- Coordinates: 31°31′17″N 74°24′12″E
- Website: www.lahoreairport.com.pk
- Interactive map of Allama Iqbal International Airport

Runways
Direction	Length		Surface
Direction	m	ft	Surface
18R/36L	2,743	8,999	Asphalt
18L/36R	3,360	11,024	Concrete

Statistics (July 2024 – June 2025)
- Passengers: 6,048,541 ▲11.6%
- Aircraft movements: 36,023 ▲24.2%
- Cargo handled: 114,882 metric tons ▲4.1%
- Source: Statistics from the Pakistan Civil Aviation Authority

Allama Iqbal International Airport (Punjabi / Urdu: علامہ اقبال بین الاقوامی ہوائی اڈا, IATA: LHE, ICAO: OPLA) is the international airport serving Lahore, the capital of Punjab province, and the second-largest city in Pakistan. It is the third largest commercial airport by traffic in Pakistan, after Jinnah International Airport in Karachi and Islamabad International Airport. It also serves a large number of travellers from the other nearby regions of Punjab province.

Originally known as Lahore International Airport, though it was renamed after the Islamic philosopher and poet Allama Muhammad Iqbal, one of the pioneers who led to the creation of Pakistan. The airport has three terminals: the Allama Iqbal terminal, the Hajj terminal, and a cargo terminal. The airport is about 15.0 kilometres (9.3 mi) from the city centre.

== History ==
At the time of the Independence of Pakistan, Walton Airport was the main airport serving the city of Lahore. When Pakistan International Airlines (PIA) acquired its first jet aircraft, the Boeing 720, Walton Airport could not handle such an aircraft. The Government of Pakistan chose to build a brand new airport on the site of a runway airbase consisting of three runways, which opened in 1962. The airport had a specifically built runway and apron to handle aircraft up to the Boeing 747. This enabled Lahore to become accessible by international flights. PIA initiated direct flights to both Dubai, and London via Karachi.

Over the course of the next 25 years, the demand for air travel rose. The government had to build a bigger terminal to meet the growing needs of the region. In March 2003, a new terminal was inaugurated by President General Pervez Musharraf, originally commissioned by then ex-Prime Minister Nawaz Sharif. The airport was named Allama Iqbal International Airport named after the national poet of Pakistan and became the second largest airport in Pakistan after the Jinnah International Airport in Karachi. All flights were switched to the new airport and Walton Airport was passed onto the military, which the government later reclaimed from the military and developed into a Hajj terminal.

In March 2006, PIA inaugurated nonstop service between Lahore and Toronto using Boeing 777-200LR aircraft. In 2008, the national flag carrier of the UAE, Etihad Airways, opened a dedicated aircraft line maintenance facility at the airport. The facility is used for day-to-day technical line maintenance on Etihad aircraft, including hydraulic structural and instrument checks.

In October 2020, British Airways resumed its direct flight operations to and from Lahore after 44 years. However, flights were postponed 3 years later.

In 2024, expansion work began at the airport aimed at reducing congestion during peak hours. The expansion included a new remote cage area and the extension of the terminal to accommodate 2 more aircraft. The expansion is expected to be completed by October 2026.

In June 2025, PIA operated the first flight between Lahore and Europe since their ban in 2020, flying to Paris. The flights were however suspended later. In March 2026, PIA resumed flights between London and Lahore, which was last served by British Airways in 2023.

=== Future plans ===
The Pakistan Civil Aviation Authority (PCAA) has planned to expand the terminal building, increasing the number of gates from 7 to 22, along with a corresponding rise in remote bays. This expansion will boost the annual passenger capacity of Lahore Airport from 6 million to 20 million, which will be sufficient to accommodate passenger demand for the next 15 to 20 years.

The new design of the Lahore Airport Expansion Project has inspiration from the national flower of Pakistan, Jasmine or locally known as "Chambeli". The airport will have four arms similar to four platters of jasmine flower. The original building has Mughal architectural features but the new airport will have a blend of Spanish and Mughal architecture.

The existing terminal main building will not be demolished but will be expanded. The current parking area will be converted into arrival and departure lounges. The first phase, which included the construction of a three-story parking facility in place of the front square lawn, has been completed and is now fully operational. The second phase, which involves upgrading the main runway, is currently underway.

The design of the airport was developed by GilBartolomé Architects from Spain, following a contract awarded to international Spanish Firm, TYSPA International, which firm also worked on expanding the Madrid and São Paulo Airports. A Joint-Venture (JV) comprising Habib Construction Services (Pakistan), Matracon (Pakistan) and CCECC (China) have been selected to carry out the expansion. During the expansion of the airport, nearby road network has also been improved, which has helped to ease traffic congestion on the roads leading to the terminal.

== Structure ==
LHE is fitted with all the essentials for domestic and international flights. The information below is correct as of September 2020.

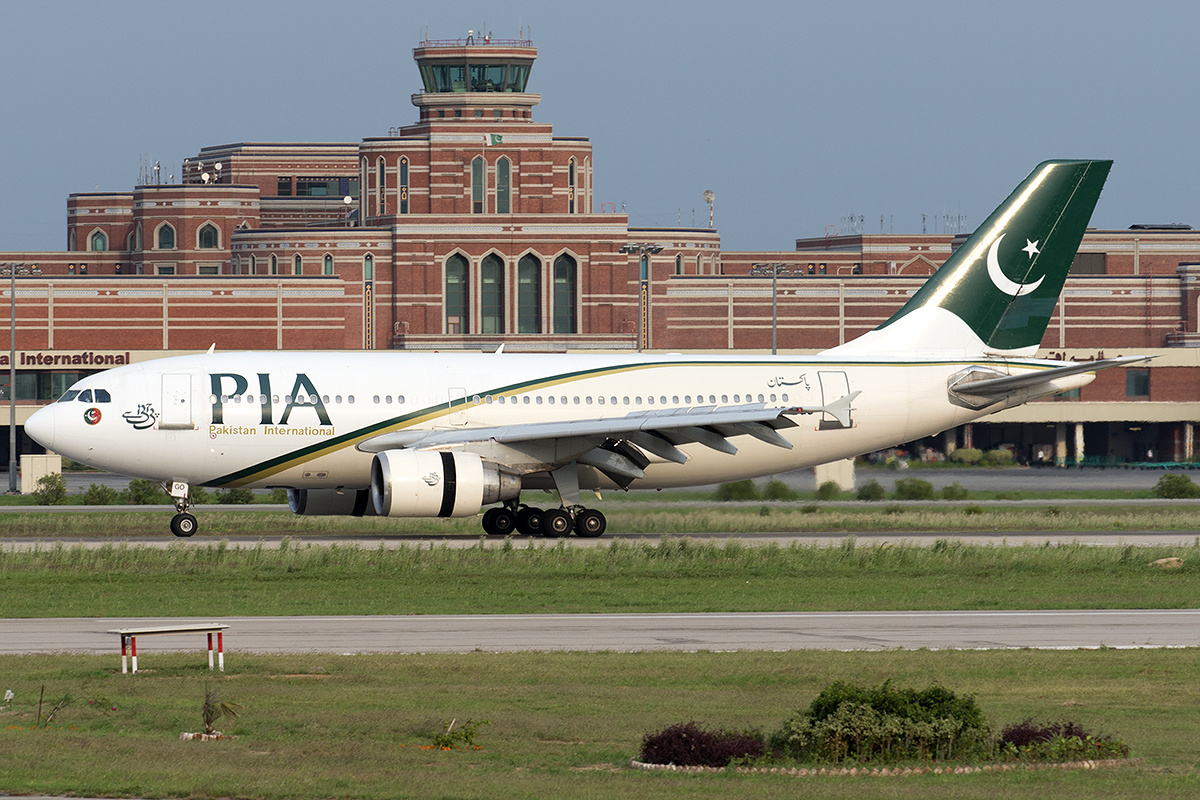
The new terminal (airside)

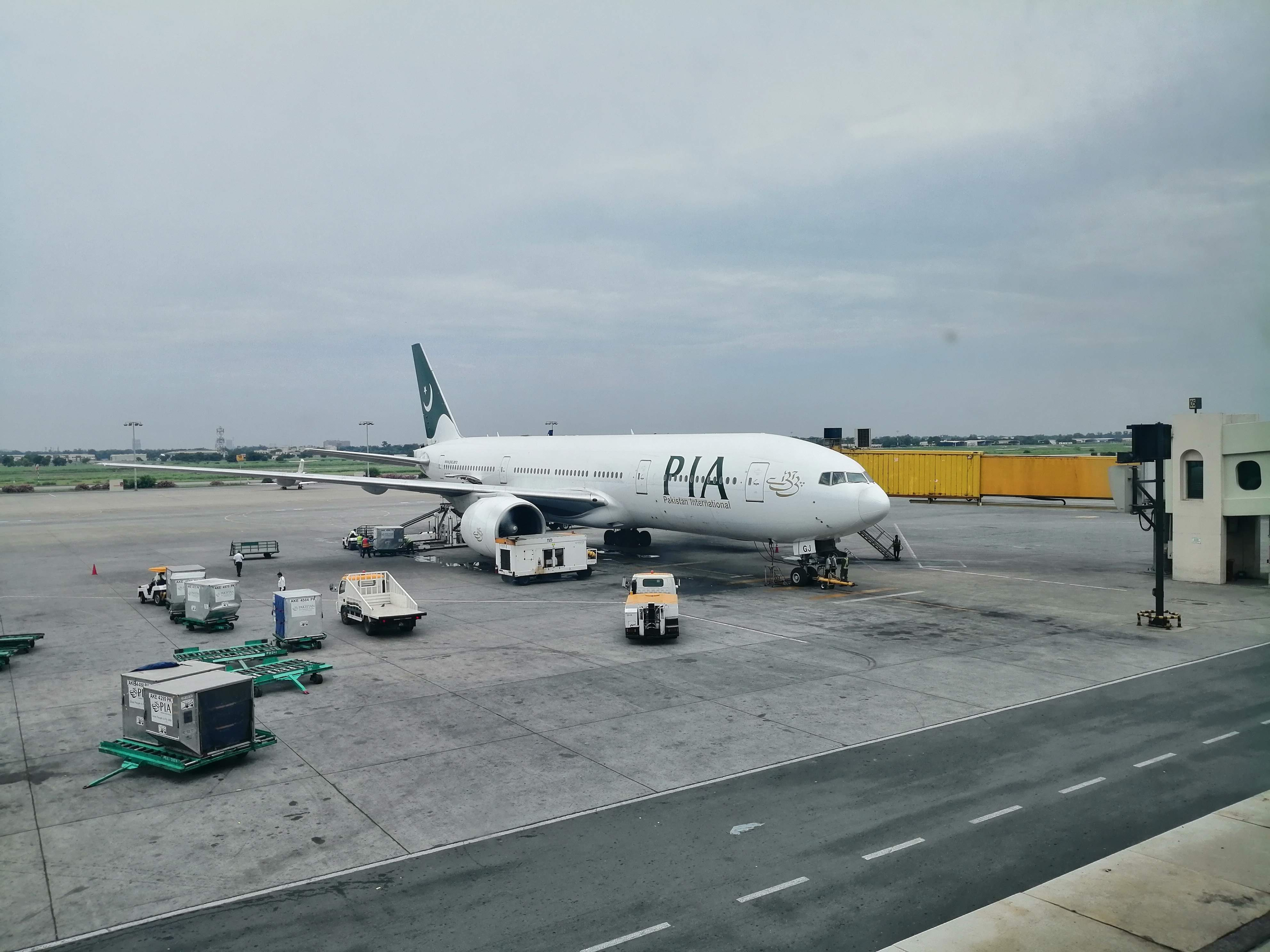
PIA Boeing 777-200ER docked on a jet-bridge

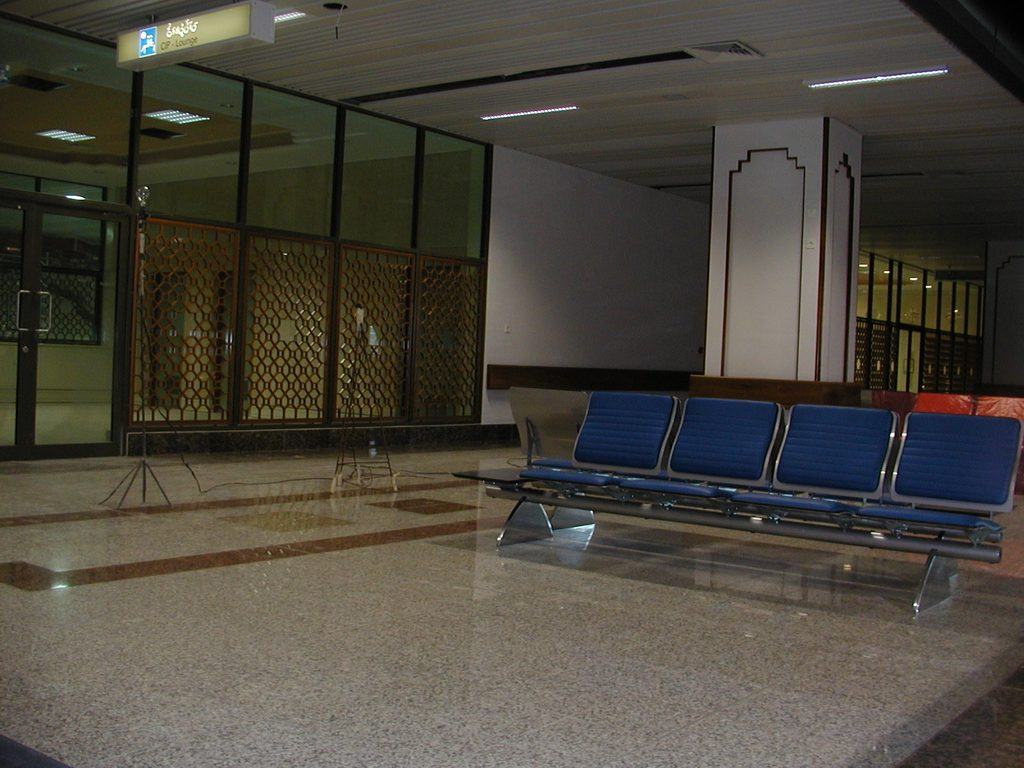
Holding Lounge

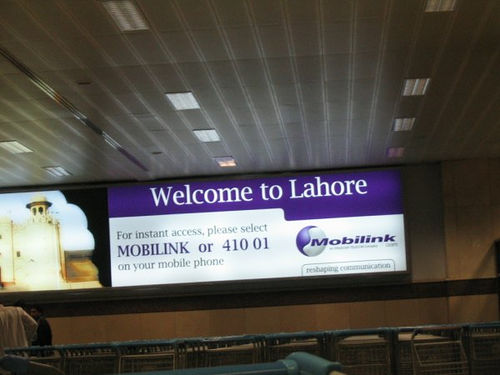
Arrival boards

=== Apron ===
- 7 air bridges with PSS & APSS facilities
- 23 remote parking stands

=== Runway ===
- Two parallel runways: one concrete, the other asphalt
- Primary Runway 36R/18L: 3,360 metres long, 45 metres wide, 15 metres shoulders on both sides. Max. capacity: Airbus A380.
- Secondary Runway 36L/18R: 2,743 metres long, 46 metres wide. Max. capacity: Boeing 747-400.
- Parallel taxiway for rapid entry/exit
- 2 rapid exit taxiways (newly constructed)
- Instrument Landing System Category-II and ILS CAT-IIIB on RWY 36R.
- Navigational aids: DVOR/DME/TDME, NDB, OM, MM

=== Airport services ===
- Pakistan State Oil provides fuel services to all airlines flying out of the airport (Jet A-100).
- Fire fighting and Rescue Services. Category: 9.
- FIDS systems located in the lounges and briefing concourses showing television programmes and flight information
- Airport Mosque, with five times daily and Jummah prayers, located outside the airport on the left-hand side of the terminal building
- CAA Porter services and Metro cab services are available.
- Customs and Immigration for international flights
- Cargo and luggage wrapping services
- Passenger assistance services (upon request)
- Full-service branches of National Bank of Pakistan, Habib Bank Ltd, Bank Al-Falah, and Allied Bank Ltd. along with ATMs
- Pakistan Post fully-staffed location

=== Ground handling agents ===
- Pakistan International Airlines
- Shaheen Airport Services (SAPS)
- Gerry's DNATA Ground Handling & Cargo
- MENZIES-RAS AIRPORT SERVICES (RAPS)

== Airlines and destinations ==
=== Passenger ===
Airlines	Destinations
Aero Nomad Airlines	Bishkek
Airblue	Dammam, Baku, Jeddah, Quetta, Skardu
AirSial	Riyadh, Dubai–International, Abu Dhabi
Azerbaijan Airlines	Baku
Batik Air Malaysia	Kuala Lumpur–International
Centrum Air	Tashkent
China Southern Airlines	Guangzhou
Emirates	Dubai–International
Etihad	Abu Dhabi
Flyadeal	Riyadh
FitsAir	Colombo–Bandaranaike
Fly Baghdad	Baghdad
Fly Jinnah	Al Ain (Begins 4 December 2026), Abu Dhabi (Begins 28 November), Bahrain, Dammam, Dubai–International, Muscat, Islamabad, Quetta, Riyadh,
Iran Air	Mashhad
Iran Airtour	Mashhad
Iraqi Airways	Najaf
Kish Air	Mashhad
Pakistan International Airlines	Bahrain, Baku, Dammam, Jeddah, Karachi, London–Heathrow, Manchester, Muscat, Skardu
Qatar Airways	Doha
Riyadh Air	Riyadh
SalamAir	Muscat
South Air	Peshawar
SriLankan Airlines	Colombo
Thai Airways International	Bangkok–Suvarnabhumi
Turkish Airlines	Istanbul
Uzbekistan Airways	Tashkent

=== Cargo ===
Airlines	Destinations
DHL Aviation	Bahrain
SF Airlines	Ezhou
YTO Cargo Airlines	Lanzhou

== Statistics ==
The following table provides details of the major traffic flows out of Lahore in terms of passenger numbers, aircraft movements, cargo and mail. Note that the Civil Aviation Authority of Pakistan operates with fiscal years starting on July and ending in June of next year. The results were collected from the Civil Aviation Authority of Pakistan website.

Fiscal year	Aircraft movements	Passengers (intl & domestic)	Cargo handled (m. tons)	Mail handled (m. tons)
2006	30,991	2,779,223	66,643	1,582
2007	29,298	3,018,220	75,816	1,713
2008	30,299	3,217,844	76,030	1,113
2009	24,804	3,506,262	84,798	1,739

Busiest routes at Allama Iqbal International Airport (by number of flights weekly)
Rank	City	Country	Number of flights	Airlines
1	Karachi	Pakistan	69	airblue, AirSial, Fly Jinnah, Pakistan International Airlines, SereneAir
2	Jeddah	Saudi Arabia	50	airblue, AirSial, Fly Jinnah, Flynas, Pakistan International Airlines, Saudia, SereneAir
3	Dubai	United Arab Emirates	42	airblue, Emirates, Flydubai, Pakistan International Airlines, SereneAir
4	Riyadh	Saudi Arabia	19	airblue, Fly Jinnah, flynas, Pakistan International Airlines, Saudia
5	Sharjah	United Arab Emirates	18	airblue, Fly Jinnah
6	Abu Dhabi	United Arab Emirates	17	airblue, Etihad Airways, Pakistan International Airlines
7	Doha	Qatar	14	Qatar Airways, Pakistan International Airlines
8	Istanbul	Turkey	14	Turkish Airlines, Pakistan International Airlines
9	Dammam	Saudi Arabia	12	AirSial, Fly Jinnah, flynas, Pakistan International Airlines
10	Kuala Lumpur	Malaysia	7	Batik Air

== See also ==
- Airlines of Pakistan
- List of airports in Pakistan
- Shaheen Airport Services
- Transport in Pakistan
