= São Paulo International Airport =

São Paulo Airport may refer to the following airports serving São Paulo, Brazil:

- São Paulo/Guarulhos International Airport (IATA: GRU, ICAO: SBGR) – newer airport, serving mainly international routes
- São Paulo–Congonhas Airport (IATA: CGH, ICAO: SBSP) – older airport, serving mainly domestic routes
- Viracopos International Airport (IATA: VCP, ICAO: SBKP) – airport serving Campinas, São Paulo State
- Campo de Marte Airport (ICAO: SBMT) – São Paulo's first airport, housing a flying school and general aviation services
