= Sialkot International Airport =

Airport serving Sialkot, Punjab

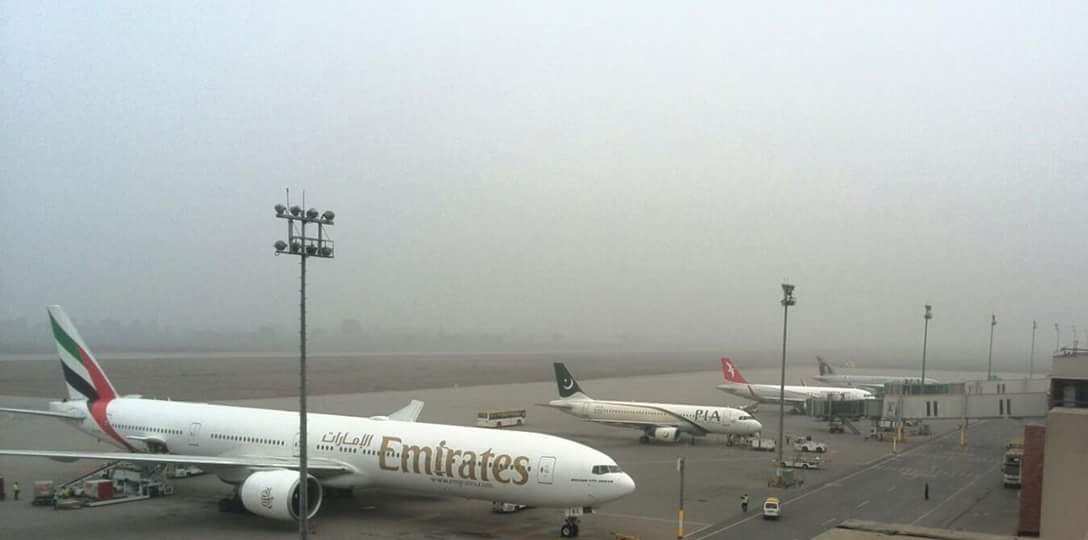
- IATA: SKT; ICAO: OPST

Summary
- Airport type: Public
- Operator: Sialkot International Airport Limited
- Serves: Sialkot
- Location: Sambrial, Sialkot-51070, Punjab
- Hub for: AirSial
- Elevation AMSL: 837 ft (255 m)
- Coordinates: 32°32′08″N 74°21′50″E
- Website: www.sial.com.pk
- Interactive map of Sialkot International Airport

Runways
Direction	Length		Surface
Direction	ft	m	Surface
04/22	11,811	3,600	Asphalt

Statistics (July 2024 – June 2025)
- Passengers: 939,899 ▼10.03%
- Aircraft movements: 5,419 ▼9.03%
- Cargo handled: 9,873 metric tons ▼5.31%
- Source: Statistics from the Pakistan Civil Aviation Authority

Sialkot International Airport (IATA: SKT, ICAO: OPST) is situated 14 km (8.7 mi) west of Sialkot in the Sialkot District of Pakistan. It is the first and only privately owned airport in Pakistan. It was built by the business community of Sialkot. Before the completion of the new green field Islamabad International Airport, it also had the longest runway in Pakistan.

According to the Pakistan Civil aviation authority, the airport handled 939,899 passengers between July 2024 and June 2025.

== History ==
Sialkot international airport was inaugurated on november 30th, 2007 and is the first fully privately owned, public international airport in all of south asia.

A new international terminal was inaugurated in 2018.

In January 2019, the inaugural Pakistan International Airlines flight from Paris via Barcelona touched down in Sialkot, linking the city to Europe for the first time.

== Structure ==
Sialkot is a major export hub of Pakistan. The airport is structurally capable of handling heavy wide-body aircraft, such as Boeing 747s or A340s. The airport authority is currently collaborating with a private company to develop the airport. Additionally, a new terminal is currently under construction to deal with an increase in passengers as well as cargo imports and exports.

The airport provides services of fuel farms, aircraft ground maintenance, catering and related services through concessions to private parties.

The runway is 3,600-metres long, and 45-metres wide with 7.5-metre wide shoulders on either side corresponding to International Civil Aviation Organisation Category 4E.

The link taxiway is 263 metres long and 23 metres wide with 10.5-metre shoulders.

It has aprons for passenger and cargo, 95,000-sq metre area. It is a combination of flexible and rigid pavements and also for nose-in parking for 7 wide bodied aircraft plus 4 ATR-42 aircraft at a time.

Two passenger boarding bridges have also become operational.

== Airlines and destinations ==
Airlines	Destinations
Air Arabia	Abu Dhabi, Sharjah
AirSial	Dammam, Dubai–International, Jeddah, Karachi, Muscat
Emirates	Dubai–International
Flyadeal	Riyadh
Flydubai	Dubai–International
Fly Jinnah	Karachi
Jazeera Airways	Kuwait
Pakistan International Airlines	Abu Dhabi, Bahrain, Dammam, Doha, Dubai–International, Jeddah, Kuwait City, Medina, Riyadh, Sharjah
Qatar Airways	Doha
SalamAir	Muscat

== See also ==
- List of airports in Pakistan
- Sialkot Cantonment Airport
- Sialkot International Airport Limited
