= Fly Jinnah =

Low-cost airline of Pakistan

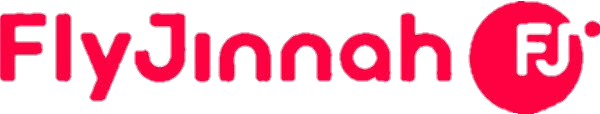
IATA	ICAO	Call sign
9P	FJL	OKAAB
- Founded: 3 September 2021; 5 years ago
- Commenced operations: 31 October 2022; 4 years ago
- Operating bases: Jinnah International Airport Islamabad International Airport; Allama Iqbal International Airport
- Frequent-flyer program: AirRewards
- Fleet size: 11
- Destinations: 15
- Parent company: Air Arabia; Lakson Group
- Headquarters: Karachi, Sindh, Pakistan
- Key people: Iqbal Ali Lakhani (chairman)
- Website: www.flyjinnah.com

Fly Jinnah or FJ is a low-cost carrier (LCC) owned and operated jointly by Lakson Group of Pakistan and Air Arabia Group of the United Arab Emirates. The joint venture was announced on 3 September 2021. The airline is based in Karachi and currently serves domestic and international destinations. Iqbal Ali Lakhani is the airline's current chairman. Fly Jinnah has emerged as Pakistan’s largest domestic airline by passenger traffic, surpassing Pakistan International Airlines (PIA) during the financial year 2024-25 by carrying approximately 1.967 million passengers.

== History ==
The airline started domestic flight operations on 31 October 2022, when its first flight took off from Jinnah International Airport in Karachi and landed at Islamabad International Airport in Islamabad.

After completing one year of satisfactory domestic flights in October 2023, Fly Jinnah was given permission by the Pakistani government to operate on international routes. This decision was taken by the Federal Cabinet on the recommendation of the Ministry of Aviation.

In 2024, Fly Jinnah along with Airblue was one of the contenders interested in acquiring Pakistan's national flag carrier, Pakistan International Airlines.

== Destinations ==
Country	City	Airport	Notes
Bahrain	Manama	Bahrain International Airport	
Oman	Muscat	Muscat International Airport	Terminated
Pakistan	Sialkot	Sialkot International Airport	
Pakistan	Islamabad	Islamabad International Airport	Base
Pakistan	Karachi	Jinnah International Airport	Hub
Pakistan	Lahore	Allama Iqbal International Airport	Base
Pakistan	Multan	Multan International Airport	
Pakistan	Peshawar	Bacha Khan International Airport	
Pakistan	Quetta	Quetta International Airport	
Saudi Arabia	Dammam	King Fahd International Airport	
Saudi Arabia	Jeddah	King Abdulaziz International Airport	
Saudi Arabia	Riyadh	King Khalid International Airport	
United Arab Emirates	Abu Dhabi	Zayed International Airport	(Begins 28 November)
United Arab Emirates	Dubai	Dubai International Airport	
United Arab Emirates	Sharjah	Sharjah International Airport	
United Arab Emirates	Al Ain	Al Ain International Airport	(Begins 2 December)

== Fleet ==
As of September 2026, Fly Jinnah operates the following aircraft:

Aircraft	In service	Orders	Passengers	Notes	Sources
Airbus A320-200	10	0	174		
Airbus A320neo	1	1	174	To be received by Air Arabia order	
Total	11	1			
