= Capital International =

Capital International may refer to:

- Capital International, a division of Capital Group Companies
- Beijing Capital International Airport
- Beijing Capital International Airport Company Limited
- Capital Region International Airport, Lansing Michigan

== See also ==
- Dubai International Capital
- China International Capital Corp
- MSCI, Morgan Stanley indices licensed from Capital International
- Capital (disambiguation)
- International (disambiguation)
