= Bayt al-Falaj Airport =

Airport in Muscat, Oman (1929 to 1980s)

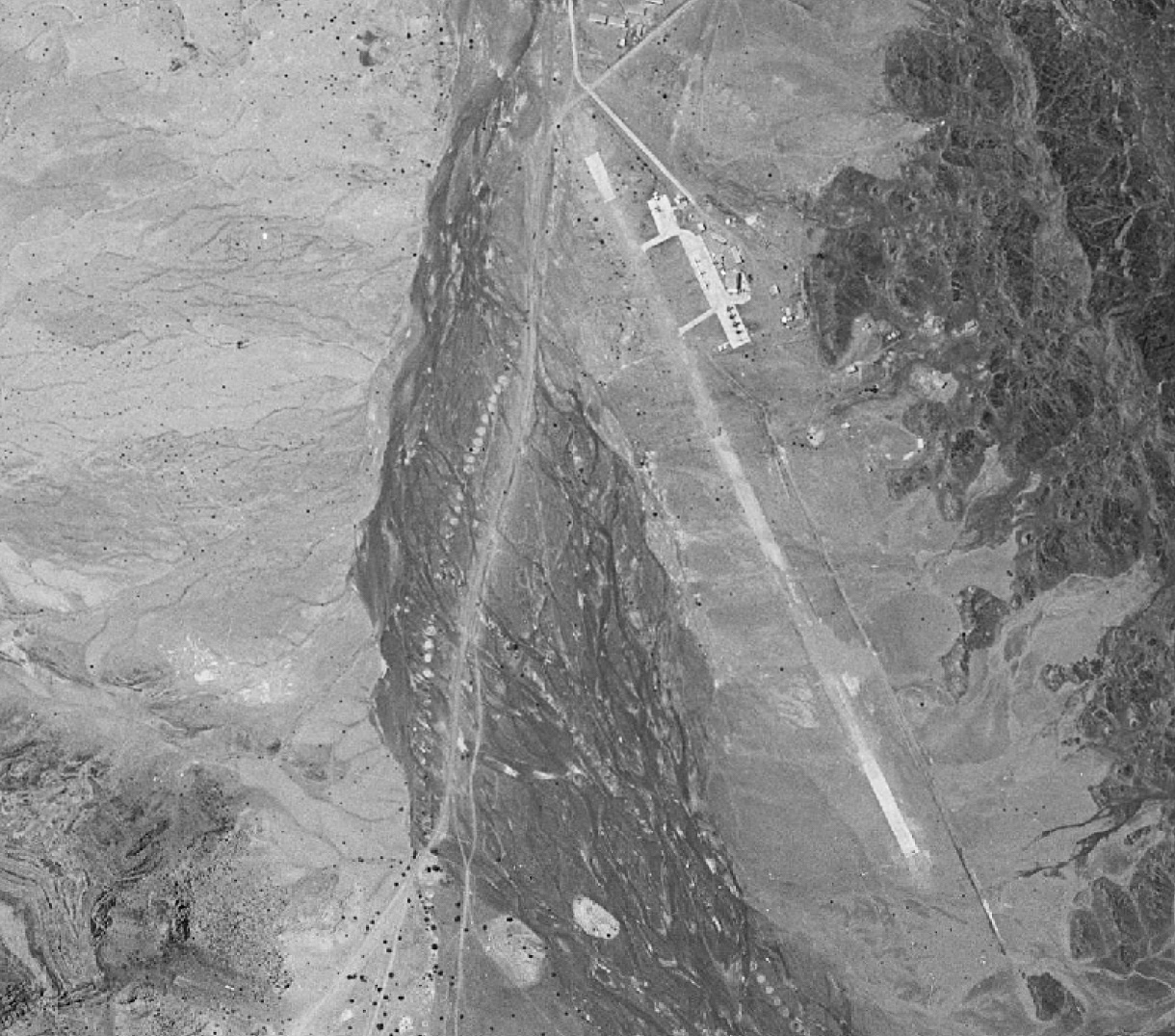
- Declassified satellite imagery of Bayt al-Falaj Airport captured by KH-7 Gambit on 29 April, 1965.
- IATA: none; ICAO: none

Summary
- Airport type: Defunct
- Owner: Sultanate of Oman
- Serves: Muscat
- Location: Bayt al-Falaj, Oman
- Opened: 1929
- Closed: December 31, 1973
- Passenger services ceased: 1973
- Elevation AMSL: 262 ft / 80 m
- Coordinates: 23°35′51″N 58°33′01″E

Map
- Shown within Oman

Runways
Direction	Length		Surface
Direction	ft	m	Surface
15/33	4,035	1,230	Asphalt

Bayt al-Falaj Airport (Arabic: مطار بيت الفلج) was an airfield in Bayt al-Falaj that served as the first airport in Oman; it was used by the Royal Air Force and by the Royal Air Force of Oman.

== History ==
Bayt al-Falaj Airport was founded by Said bin Taimur and was established in 1929. It was used by the Royal Air Force and by the Royal Air Force of Oman, as well as civilian airlines like Gulf Aviation. The aircraft of Gulf Aviation that operated in Bayt al-Falaj were Short SC.7 Skyvans, De Havilland Doves, and similar planes. The airport facilitated oil exploration by Petroleum Development Oman, which flew aircraft to fields in Fahd, Qarn al Alam, and other locations. The aircraft managed by government operators included Short SC.7 Skyvans, Douglas DC-3s, and similar planes on the airfield. By the 1970s, both Pakistan Airlines and British Airwys flew semi-regular flights to the airport.

However, following economic reforms and the need for a larger airport to serve Muscat's needs, the Bayt al-Falaj Airport stopped operating flights in 1973 and was replaced by Seeb International Airport. With all airport operations ceased, the airport's runway was later converted to a driving school.

== Facilities ==
Bayt al-Falaj Airport had some, but not well-developed, facilities. It had a communication centre and a customs office.

The airport also had four taxiways and one runway that was originally sand/dirt but later was upgraded to asphalt.

The runway, according to a 1965 declassified satellite image, was approximately 4,035 feet in length. More than 10 buildings/facilities are shown at the airport in the image.

== Air Services ==
The Petroleum Development Oman operated flights at the airport, as well as Gulf Aviation, Pakistan International Airlines, and British Overseas Airways Corporation.

PIA flew Fokker F27 Friendships to the airport from Gwadar, meanwhile Gulf Aviation operated DC-3 flights.

== Reason for Closure ==
The airport was closed because of the mountainous terrain around it, and of course, it was too small for Muscat.
