= UKH (disambiguation) =

UKH may refer to:

- University of Kurdistan Hewler, an educational institution in Erbil/Hewlêr, the Kurdistan Region of Iraq
- ukh, the ISO 639-3 code for Ukhwejo language
- Mukhaizna Airport, the IATA code UKH
- Lianyungang East railway station, the telegraph code UKH
