= SalamAir =

Low-cost airline in Oman

Salam Air

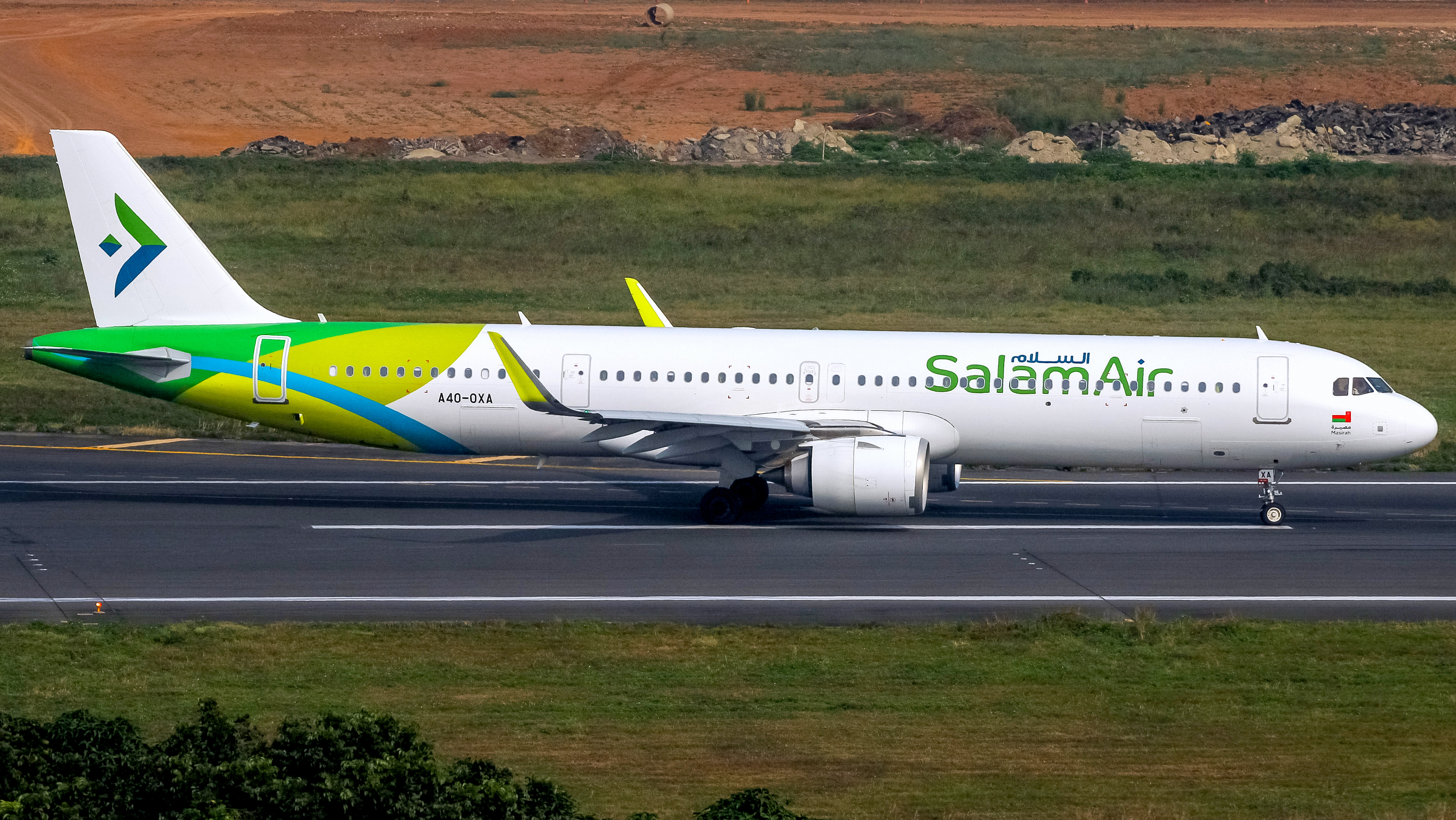
- SalamAir Airbus A321neo
IATA	ICAO	Call sign
OV	OMS	MAZOON
- Founded: 2016; 10 years ago
- Commenced operations: 30 January 2017; 9 years ago
- Hubs: Muscat International Airport
- Focus cities: Salalah International Airport
- Fleet size: 16
- Destinations: 41
- Headquarters: Muscat, Oman
- Key people: Mohammed Bin Abdullah Al Khonji (Chairman); Yaqoob bin Saif bin Hamoud Al Kiyumi (CEO); Steve Allen (CCO); Olcay Turker (CFO)
- Website: www.salamair.com

SalamAir (Arabic: طيران السلام, romanized: Ṭayarān as-salām) is a low-cost airline from Oman headquartered and based at Muscat International Airport.

== History ==
SalamAir was owned by the Muscat National Development & Infrastructure Company (ASAAS) which won a government tender in January 2016. Founded in 2014, ASAAS is a partnership between the Oman Investment Authority, Muscat Municipality, and various pension funds. Oman's Public Authority for Civil Aviation (PACA) had invited bids in 2015 for a low-cost commercial airline operator in Oman.

The airline operated three Airbus A320-200s leased from South America's LATAM Group. Its first aircraft arrived in Muscat on November 18, 2016, to coincide with the country's National Day. The airline commenced flights between the Omani cities of Muscat and Salalah from 30 January 2017, and SalamAir flew the Muscat–Dubai route, the airline's first international service, on 28 February 2017. It initially served Dubai World Central but the service has switched to Dubai International Airport in October 2017. Since opening, SalamAir has rapidly grown their route network and now fly to over 32 destinations in the Middle East, Asia and Europe.

On 26 March 2026, the Government of Oman acquired a 90% stake in SalamAir in an effort to develop a more integrated aviation sector, together with the country's flag carrier Oman Air.

== Corporate affairs ==
As of October 2026, the CEO position is held by Yaqoob Al Kiyumi. The role was previously held by Adrian Hamilton-Manns since June 2024, who in turn succeeded Captain Mohamed Ahmed.

== Destinations ==
As of July 2026, SalamAir serves the following destinations:

Country	City	Airport	Notes	Refs
Albania	Tirana	Tirana International Airport Nënë Tereza		
Austria	Vienna	Vienna International Airport		
Azerbaijan	Baku	Heydar Aliyev International Airport	Seasonal	
Bangladesh	Chittagong	Shah Amanat International Airport		
Bangladesh	Dhaka	Shahjalal International Airport		
Denmark	Copenhagen	Copenhagen International Airport	Begins 14 November 2026	
Egypt	Giza	Sphinx International Airport		
India	Bangalore	Kempegowda International Airport		
India	Chennai	Chennai International Airport	Terminated	
India	Delhi	Indira Gandhi International Airport	Terminated	
India	Hyderabad	Rajiv Gandhi International Airport		
India	Jaipur	Jaipur International Airport		
India	Kozhikode	Calicut International Airport		
India	Lucknow	Chaudhary Charan Singh International Airport		
India	Mumbai	Chhatrapati Shivaji Maharaj International Airport		
Germany	Munich	Munich Airport	Terminated	
Indonesia	Medan	Kualanamu International Airport		
Iraq	Baghdad	Baghdad International Airport		
Iraq	Najaf	Al Najaf International Airport		
Iran	Shiraz	Shiraz International Airport		
Iran	Tehran	Tehran Imam Khomeini International Airport		
Kazakhstan	Almaty	Almaty International Airport		
Kenya	Nairobi	Jomo Kenyatta International Airport		
Kuwait	Kuwait City	Kuwait International Airport	Terminated	
Lebanon	Beirut	Beirut Rafic Hariri International Airport		
Oman	Duqm	Duqm Airport		
Oman	Mukhaizna	Mukhaizna Airport		
Oman	Muscat	Muscat International Airport	Hub	
Oman	Salalah	Salalah International Airport		
Oman	Sohar	Sohar Airport		
Pakistan	Islamabad	Islamabad International Airport		
Pakistan	Karachi	Jinnah International Airport		
Pakistan	Lahore	Allama Iqbal International Airport		
Pakistan	Multan	Multan International Airport		
Pakistan	Peshawar	Bacha Khan International Airport		
Pakistan	Sialkot	Sialkot International Airport		
Qatar	Doha	Hamad International Airport		
Rwanda	Kigali	Kigali International Airport		
Saudi Arabia	Abha	Abha International Airport		
Saudi Arabia	Dammam	King Fahd International Airport		
Saudi Arabia	Jeddah	King Abdulaziz International Airport		
Saudi Arabia	Medina	Prince Mohammad bin Abdulaziz International Airport		
Saudi Arabia	Riyadh	King Khalid International Airport		
Somalia	Mogadishu	Aden Adde International Airport		
Sri Lanka	Colombo	Bandaranaike International Airport		
Syria	Damascus	Damascus International Airport		
Thailand	Bangkok	Suvarnabhumi Airport		
Thailand	Phuket	Phuket International Airport		
Turkey	Istanbul	Istanbul Sabiha Gökçen International Airport		
Turkey	Trabzon	Trabzon Airport	Seasonal	
United Arab Emirates	Dubai	Dubai International Airport		

=== Codeshare agreements ===
SalamAir has codeshare agreements with the following airlines:

- Oman Air

== Fleet ==
=== Current fleet ===
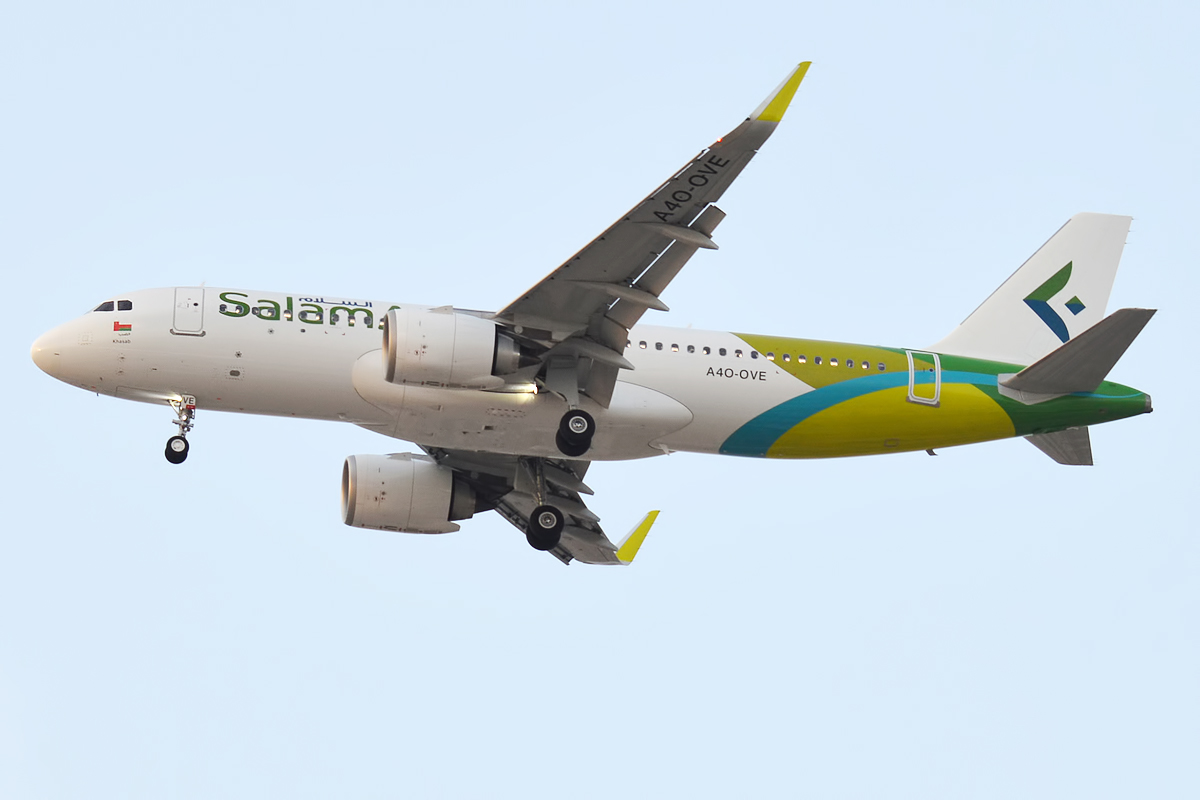
SalamAir Airbus A320neo

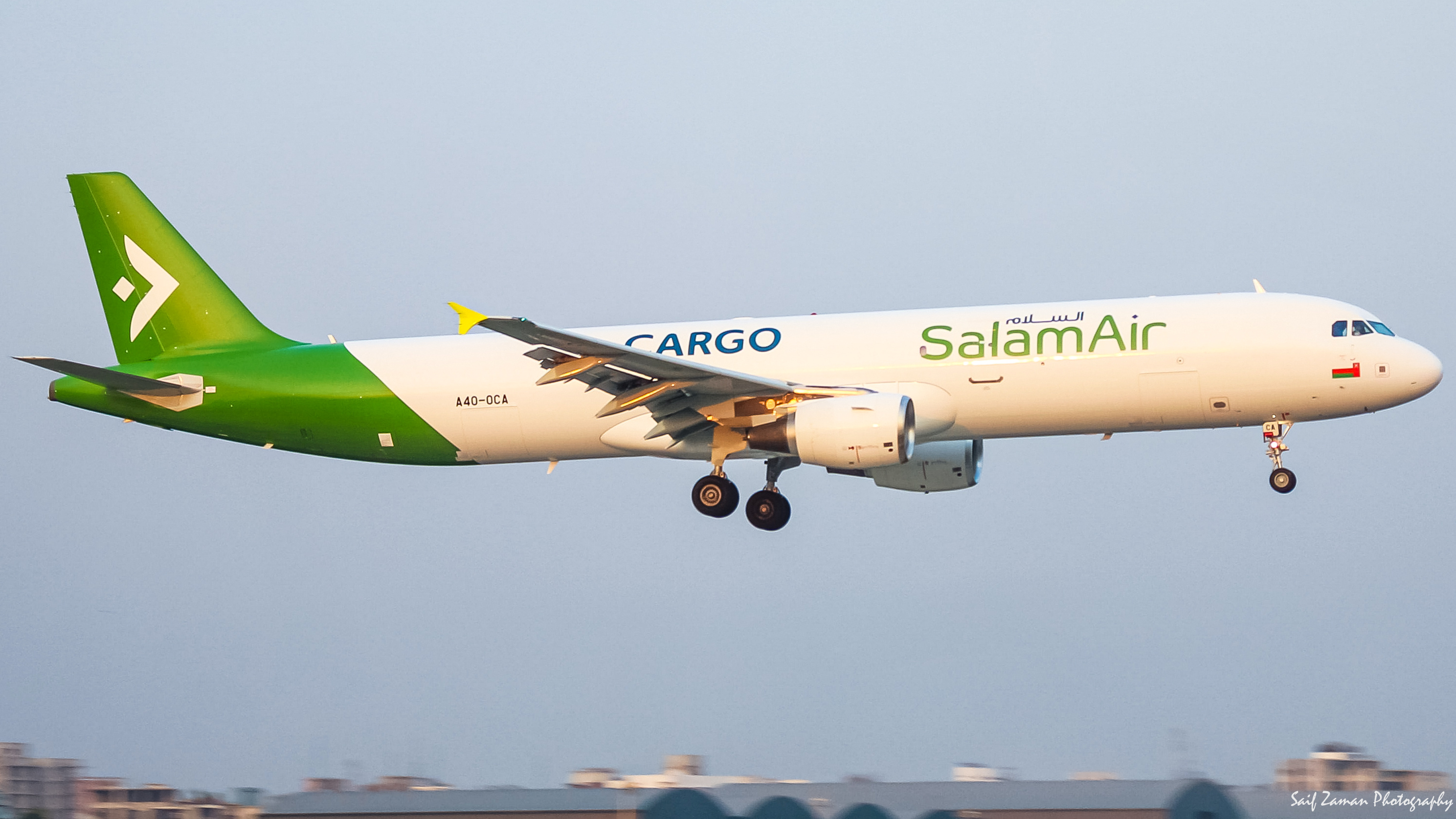
SalamAir Cargo Airbus A321-200P2F

As of August 2025, the SalamAir fleet consists of the following aircraft:

Aircraft	In service	Orders	Passengers	Notes
Airbus A320neo	6	10	180	
Airbus A321neo	9	—	230	
Embraer E195-E2	—	6	135	Order deferred.
SalamAir Cargo fleet
Airbus A321-200P2F	1	—	Cargo	Inactive.
Total	16	16		
