= Bayt al-Falaj =

- Capital area suburb
- Location in Oman
- Coordinates: 23°36′N 58°33′E
- Country: Oman
- Governorate: Muscat Governorate
- Time zone: UTC+4 (Oman Standard Time)

Bayt al-Falaj is a village in Muscat, in northeastern Oman. It was the site of Muscat's airport and main operating base for the country's air force (which opened in 1929), prior to the opening of Muscat International Airport at Seeb in 1973.

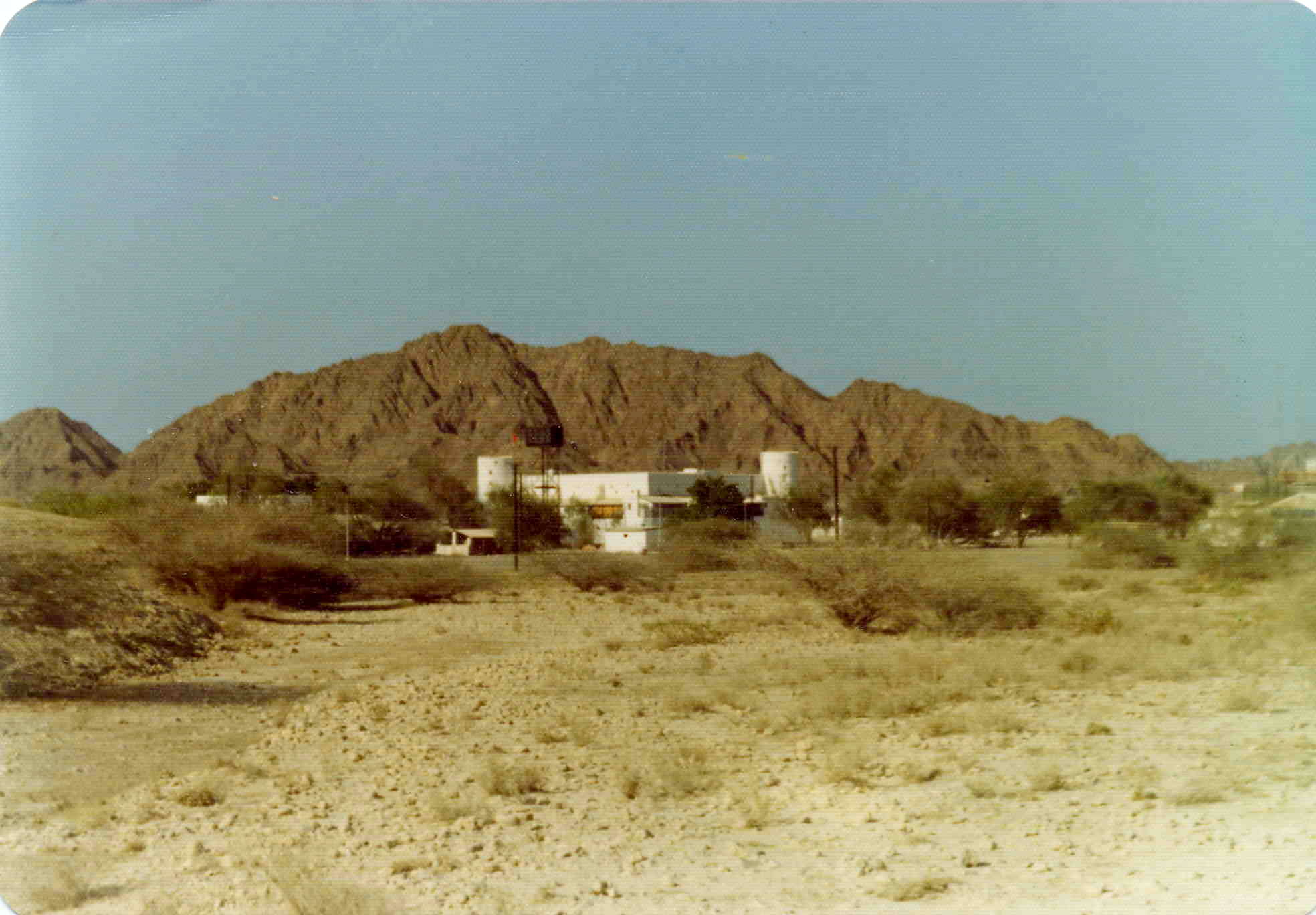
The fort at Bayt al-Falaj in 1974

It is also the location of the Sultan's Armed Forces Museum inside the old fort, built by the sultan Said bin Sultan in 1845. The fort had been the Headquarters of the sultan's Armed Forces up until the 1970s.

The office of Sayyid Badr bin Saud Al Busaidi, Minister Responsible For Defence Affairs is located in a new headquarters complex in Bayt al-Falaj camp; as well as the SAF Command and Staff College.

The offices of the Royal Navy of Oman's Oman National Hydrographic Office is also based in Bayt al-Falaj.
