= Mukhaizna Airport =

- IATA: UKH; ICAO: OOMK

Summary
- Airport type: Public
- Serves: Mukhaizna oil field, Oman
- Elevation AMSL: 479 ft / 146 m
- Coordinates: 19°23′24″N 56°23′52″E

Map
- Location of the airport in Oman UKH (Middle East) UKH (West and Central Asia) UKH (Asia)

Runways
Direction	Length		Surface
Direction	m	ft	Surface
14/32	2,500	8,202	Asphalt
- Source: Google Maps, SkyVector GCM

Mukhaizna Airport (IATA: UKH, ICAO: OOMK) is an airport serving the Mukhaizna oil field in Oman. The runway has 300 metres (980 ft) overruns on each end.

The Haima VOR-DME (Ident: HAI) is located 35.3 nautical miles (65 km) north-northwest of the airport.

== Airlines and destinations ==
Airlines	Destinations
Oman Air	Charter: Muscat
SalamAir	Charter: Muscat

== See also ==
- Transport in Oman
- List of airports in Oman
