= Sultan's Armed Forces Museum =

Military history museum

Coordinates: 23.6096°N 58.5459°E

- The Seal of Royal Armed Forces of Oman
- Established: 1988
- Location: Al Mujamma Street, Bayt al Falaj, Ruwi, Oman
- Type: Military history museum.
- Director: Ministry of Defence

The Sultan's Armed Forces Museum is a military history museum, located in the 150-year-old Bait Al Falaj Fort, once the headquarters for Sultan Said bin Sultan's Armed Forces, located on Al Mujamma Street, in the Ruwi area near Muscat, Oman. It was inaugurated in 1988 by Sultan Qaboos bin Said, the supreme commander of the Armed Forces.

The museum has a collection related to Oman's military history and national conflicts, with displays of weapons (such as guns and cannons), service uniforms, an external display of military vehicles, military music instruments, medals and a jet aircraft ejection seat and a parachute on display.

== See also ==
- List of museums in Oman
