= Capital Airport Holding =

Chinese Airport Holding Company

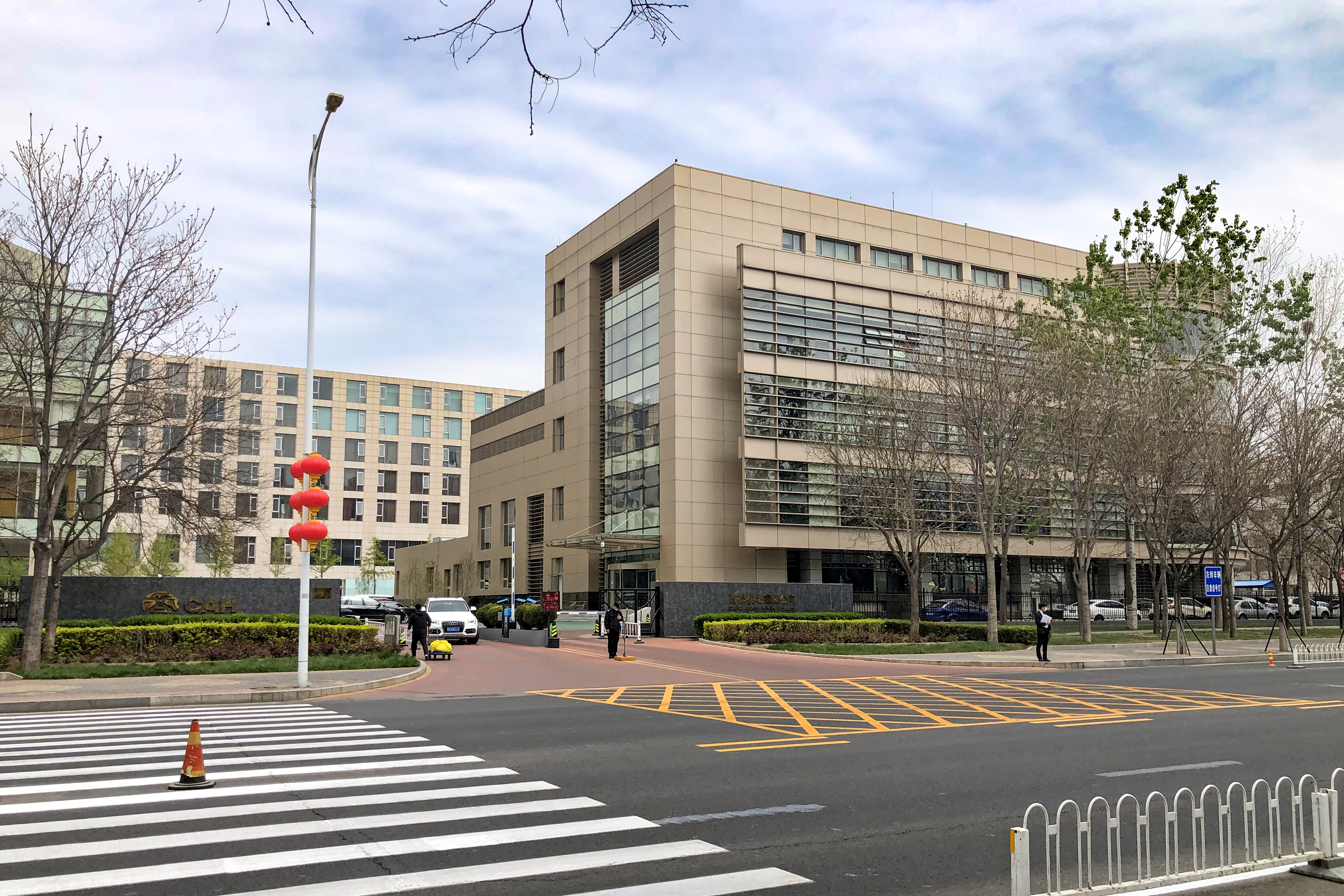
- Simplified Chinese: 首都机场集团公司
Transcriptions

Capital Airport Holdings Limited (CAH) is a wholly owned entity of the Civil Aviation Administration of China which operates airports. It is the parent company of Beijing Capital International Airport, the operator of the airport of the same name.

== History ==
The history of Capital Airport Holding dates back to June 13, 1988 when CAAC Beijing Administration was split into three parts: CAAC North China Regional Administration, Air China and Beijing Capital International Airport.

The current Capital Airport Holding was established on December 28, 2002 from the merger of Beijing Capital Airport Holding Company, Beijing Capital International Airport Company Ltd., Tianjin Binhai International Airport, China Airport Construction Corporation, Jinfei Economic Development Company Ltd. and Civil Aviation Engineering Consulting Company of China.

== Market ==
CAH operates 40 wholly owned or holding companies in the group with assets of more than ¥100 billion yuan and around 38,000 staff members.

These comprise over 40 airports in nine provinces (municipality directly under the Central Government, autonomous region) including Beijing, Tianjin, Jiangxi, Hubei, Chongqing, Guizhou, Jilin, Inner Mongolia and Heilongjiang.

The group also has investments in Shenyang and Dalian Airports. The company controls 30% of passenger throughput in the national civil aviation market.

== See also ==
- Civil Aviation Administration of China
- Transport in the People's Republic of China
- List of airports in the People's Republic of China
- China's busiest airports by passenger traffic
- List of airlines of the People's Republic of China
