= Beijing Capital International Airport Company Limited =

Chinese airport operator

- Company type: public
- Traded as: SEHK: 694 (H share)
- Industry: Airport operations
- Founded: 1999
- Headquarters: Beijing, China
- Area served: China
- Key people: Wang Changyi (Chairman of the Board of Directors and Secretary of the Party Committee); Liu Chunchen (General Manager and Deputy Secretary of the Party Committee); Liu Xuesong (Chairman of the Board of Supervisors)
- Parent: Capital Airport Holding
- Website: Beijing Capital International Airport Company Limited

Beijing Capital International Airport Co., Ltd.
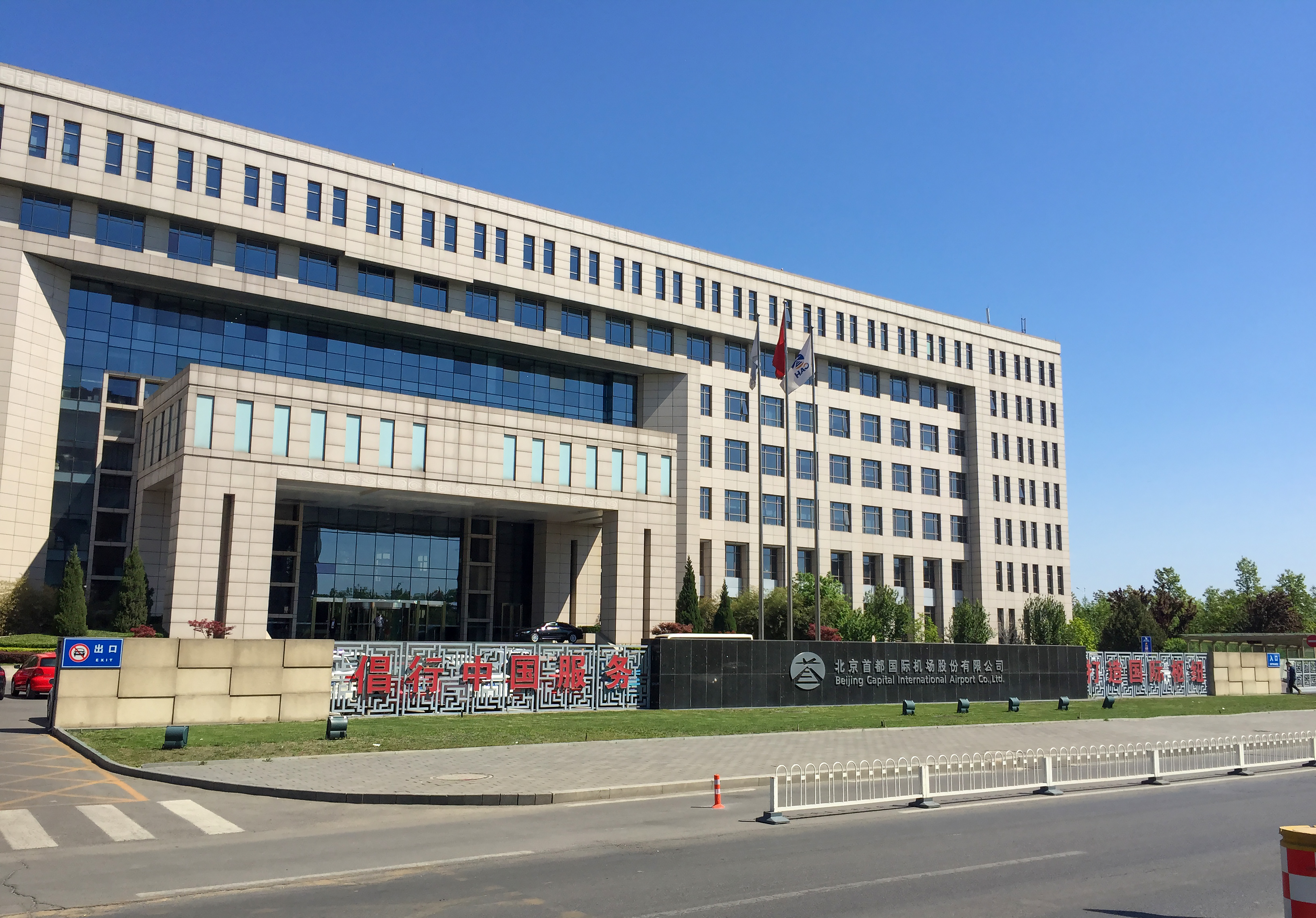
- Simplified Chinese: 北京首都机场股份有限公司
- Traditional Chinese: 北京首都機場股份有限公司
- Literal meaning: Beijing Capital International Airport Joint-Stock Limited Company
Transcriptions
Standard Mandarin
- Hanyu Pinyin: Běijīng Shǒudūjīchǎng Gǔfènyǒuxiàngōngsī

Beijing Capital International Airport Company Limited (BCIA), majority owned by Capital Airport Holding, is engaged in the ownership and operation of the Beijing Capital International Airport in Beijing, China, and the provision of related services.

== Facilities ==
The company provides aircraft and passenger facilities, ground support services and fire-fighting services for airlines. It is also in charge of franchising ground handling agent services, in-flight catering services, retail shop operations, food and beverage businesses, and leasing of advertising spaces inside and outside the terminals.

== History ==
The company's H shares was listed on the Hong Kong Stock Exchange on 1 February 2000. It plans to issue A shares on the Shanghai Stock Exchange in the near future.

Li Peiying, a former head official of the company from 1995 to 2003, was found guilty in February 2009 of accepting $4 million in bribes and stealing a further $12 million in public funds. Li was executed on August 7, 2009 in Jinan after the Supreme People's Court upheld a lower court's rejection of his appeal.

Due to capacity constraints, BCIA was involved in feasibility studies for a second major airport to the south of Beijing. China's National Development and Reform Commission (NDRC), the Civil Aviation Administration of China (CAAC), and the Beijing municipal government were also involved in the feasibility studies. Construction of the second Beijing airport, Beijing Daxing International Airport, took place from 2014 to June 2019, and was officially opened on 26 September 2019.

== See also ==
- Beijing Capital International Airport
- Beijing Daxing International Airport
