= Mukhaizna Oil Field =

Oil field in Al Wusta Governorate, Oman

Mukhaizna
- Location within Oman
- Country: Oman
- Offshore/onshore: onshore
- Coordinates: 19°20′35″N 56°27′55″E
- Operator: Oxy

Production
- Current production of oil: 120.000 barrels per day (~5,980 t/a)

The Mukhaizna Oil Field is an oilfield in Al Wusta Governorate, Oman. Its production is nearly 120.000 barrels per day (19.0785 m^{3}/d).

It is served by Mukhaizna Airport.
