= Muscat International Airport =

International airport in Seeb, Oman

Muscat International Airport مطار مسقط الدولي

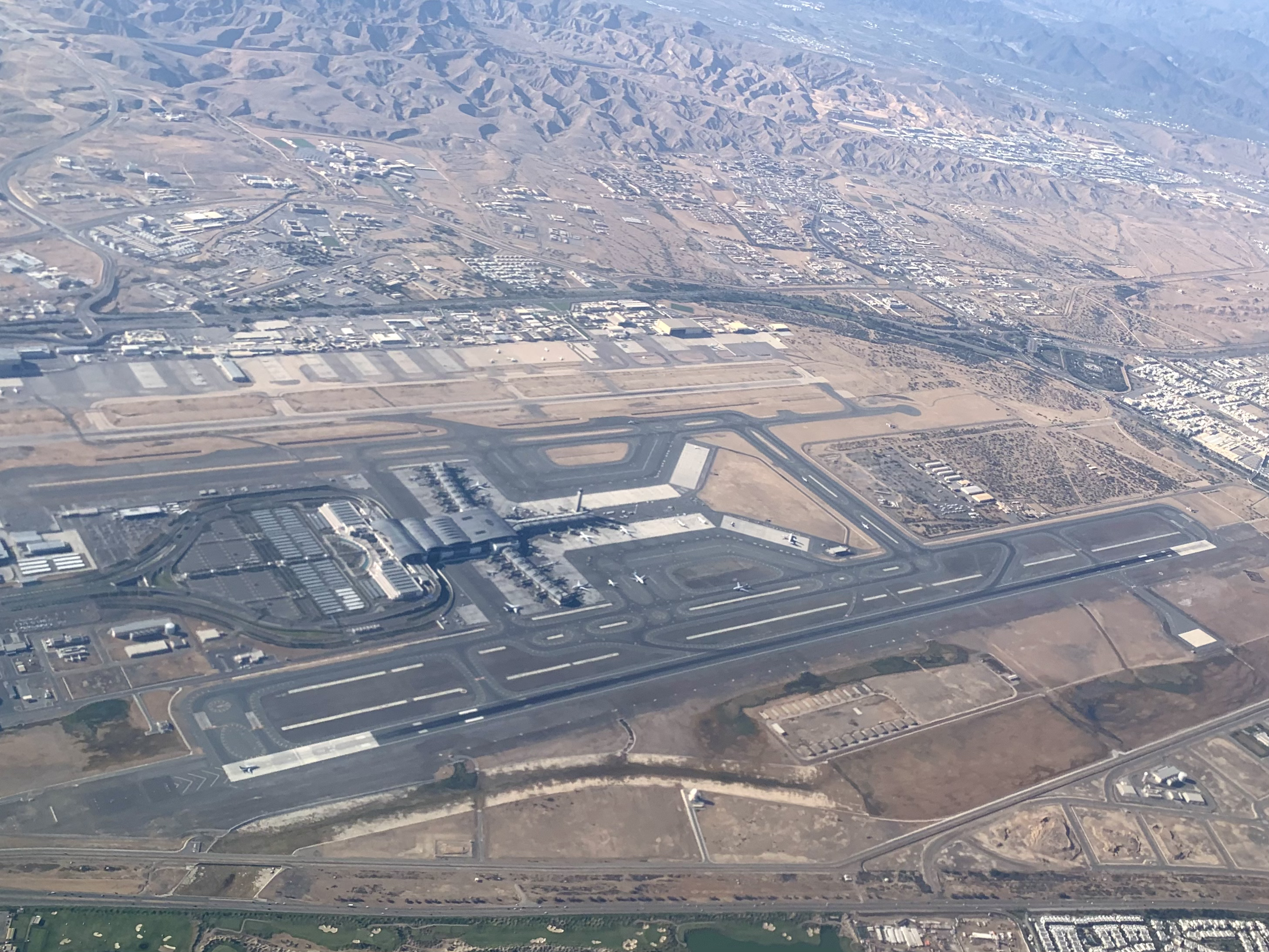
- IATA: MCT; ICAO: OOMS

Summary
- Airport type: Public
- Owner/Operator: Oman Airports
- Serves: Muscat
- Location: Seeb, Oman
- Opened: 1929; 97 years ago
- Hub for: Oman Air; SalamAir
- Elevation AMSL: 48 ft (15 m)
- Coordinates: 23°35′36″N 058°17′04″E
- Website: www.muscatairport.co.om

Maps
- Location of airport in Oman
- Interactive map of Muscat International Airport

Runways
| Direction | Length | | Surface |
| Direction | ft | m | Surface |
|---|---|---|---|
| 08R/26L | 13,385 | 4,080 | Asphalt |
| 08L/26R | 13,123 | 4,000 | Asphalt |

Statistics (2025)
- Total passengers: 13.2M ▲
- Total aircraft movements: 91,841 ▼ ▲

Muscat International Airport (IATA: MCT, ICAO: OOMS), formerly known as Seeb International Airport, is the biggest and busiest international airport in Oman. It is located in the Seeb province, 32 km (20 miles) from the old city and capital Muscat within the Muscat metropolitan area. The airport serves as the hub for Oman Air, the flag carrier, and SalamAir, Oman's first budget airline. The airport serves flights to regional destinations as well as multiple intercontinental services to Asia, Africa, and Europe.

== History ==
In 1929, Muscat's original airport, Bayt al-Falaj Airport, was established and became fully operational. It served as the capital's first airport and was known for sharp turns and steep descents. Airlines such as Gulf Aviation (later Gulf Air) and Oman International Services were its first users; however, it was mainly used for military purposes. Additionally, it was regularly utilized by the Petroleum Development Oman Company for its aircraft, flying between Muscat and oil exploration fields in Fahud, Qarn Al Alam, and other locations.

In the following decades, Bayt al-Falaj Airport eventually became too small for increasingly large airplanes, as well as being considered above-average dangerous, due to its steep approach, which was caused by the surrounding mountains. Consequently, a new airport with larger spaces to expand operations was required to be constructed. After the government reviewed several locations for the new airport, it eventually chose Seeb village as the optimal; therefore, the airport was built in its present location. Oman's ruling royal family, the Al Bu Said dynasty, awarded the Netherlands Airport Consultancy (NACO) the design contract and responsibility of supervising the construction. Additionally, the contract to construct the runway, taxiways, and aircraft stands was granted to the Greek construction company Joannou & Paraskevaides.

The airport was ceremonially opened as Seeb International Airport on 1 January 1973. In the initial years, it had a single operational terminal building that served both arrivals and departures, and only two check-in and immigration desks. In the mid-1970s, the airport was later night-rated.

In the 1980s and 1990s, the former terminal was extended with new facilities. A new terminal was built to house arrivals and immigrations as well as transfers. Subsequently, a new cargo terminal was also constructed.

In the past, the airport has hosted Royal Air Force BAe Nimrods, including the military aircraft that were used during the Gulf War in 1991. These aircraft cooperated with the Royal Navy of Oman in the 'Magic Roundabout' exercise series. The base was used by a detachment of Vickers VC10 tankers from No. 101 Squadron RAF during the Gulf War training with Royal Air Force SEPECAT Jaguars.

On 1 February 2008, the airport was given its present name.

== Facilities ==
=== Overview ===
The airport spans an area of 2,200 hectares (5,500 acres). It originally featured one passenger terminal building and one runway, as well as minor cargo and maintenance facilities. Part of the airport complex extension featured housing for airport employees and Oman Air employees. During the expansion, a new terminal and control tower were built along with a new runway. The current terminal makes Muscat airport the biggest airport in the country. Its construction started in 2007, and the airport opened in 2018. Moreover, the newly built facilities include a VIP terminal for private jets as well as an on-site airport hotel.

The airport is also a joint-use military and public facility, acting as the base of operations for both the Royal Flight of Oman and the Royal Air Force of Oman. A Royal Terminal and Royal Flight hangars are located adjacent to the old terminal.

In 2019, the Aaronia AARTOS C-UAS drone detection system was installed at the airport's premises, making Muscat International Airport the first international airport in the world to possess an operational drone detection system.

=== Terminals ===
==== New Terminal 1 ====
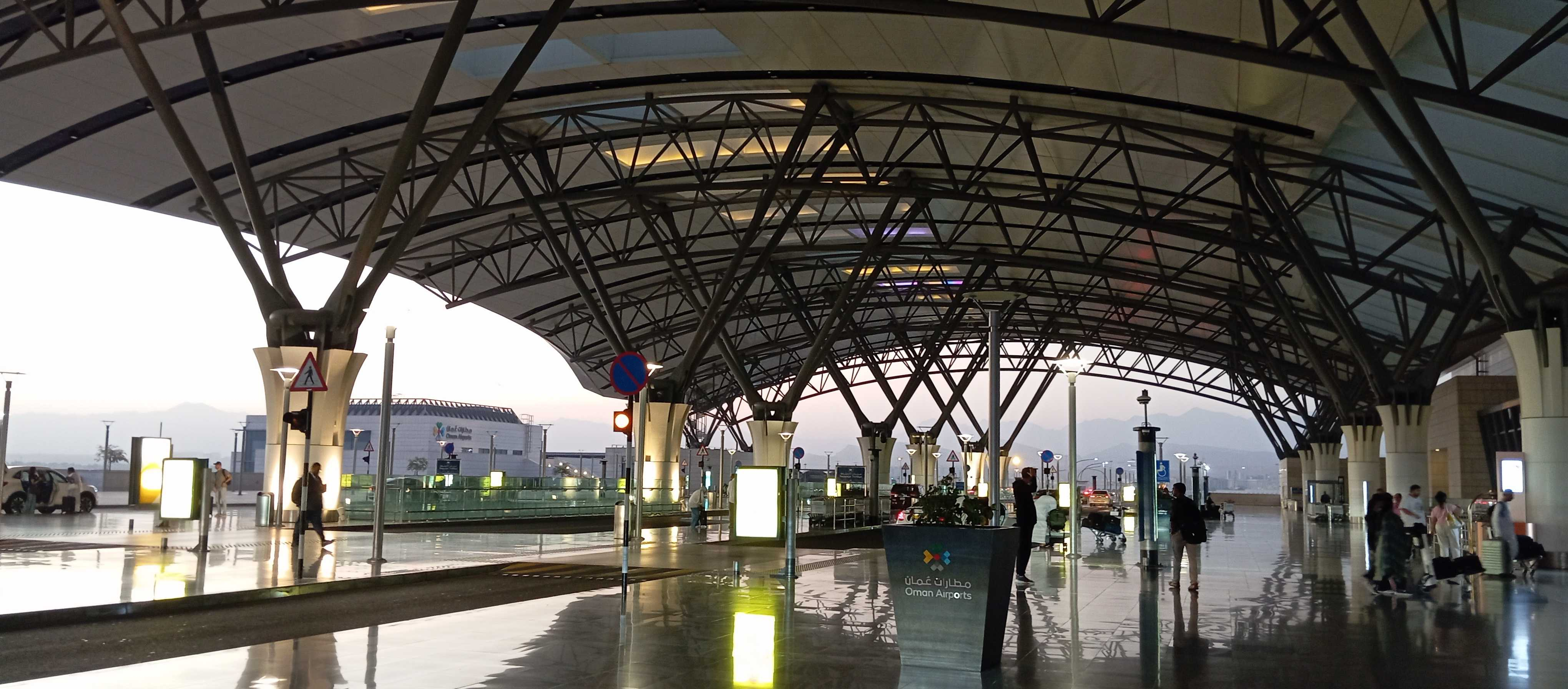
Departures at Terminal 1

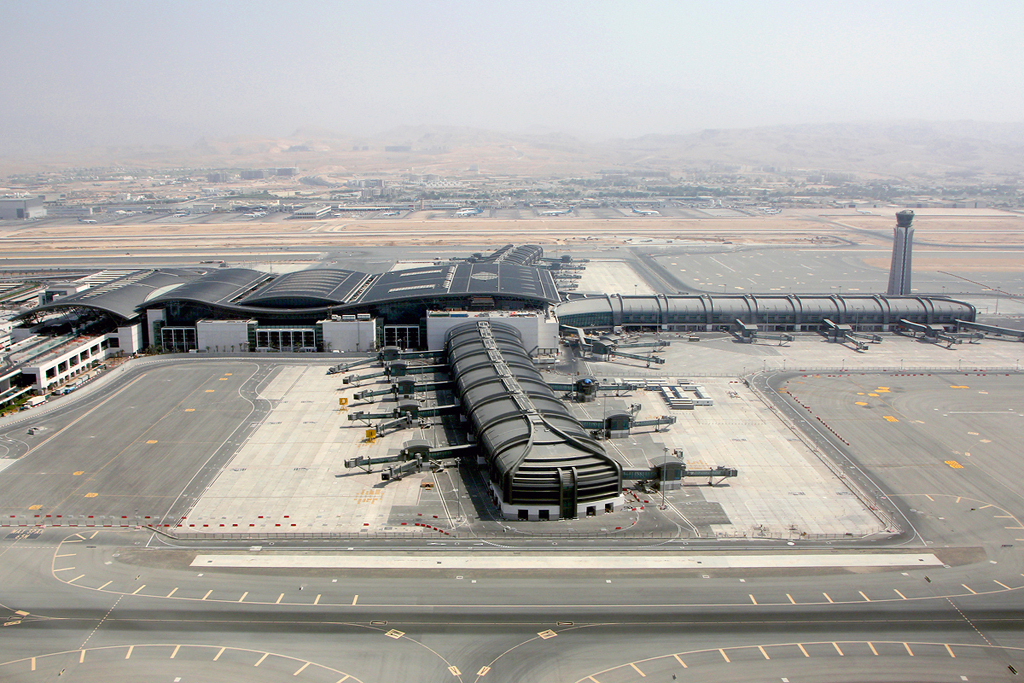
Terminal 1 (new terminal)

The airport's newer and significantly larger terminal, located north of the existing terminal and first runway, opened in 2018. This new building initially expanded the airport's capacities to serve up to 20 million passengers a year upon completion of the first phase. Subsequent enlargements under the second and third phases will increase the airport capacity to 24 and 48 million annual passengers, respectively. The terminal covers 580,000 m^{2} (6,200,000 sq ft) and features 118 check-in counters, ten baggage reclaim belts, 82 immigration counters, 45 gates, and a new, 97 m-high (318 ft) control tower. The new terminal is situated between the old and new runways and is capable of handling large aircraft such as Airbus A380s and Boeing 747s. The terminal opened on 18 March 2018, with the first flight, an Oman Air flight from Najaf, arriving at 6:30 p.m.

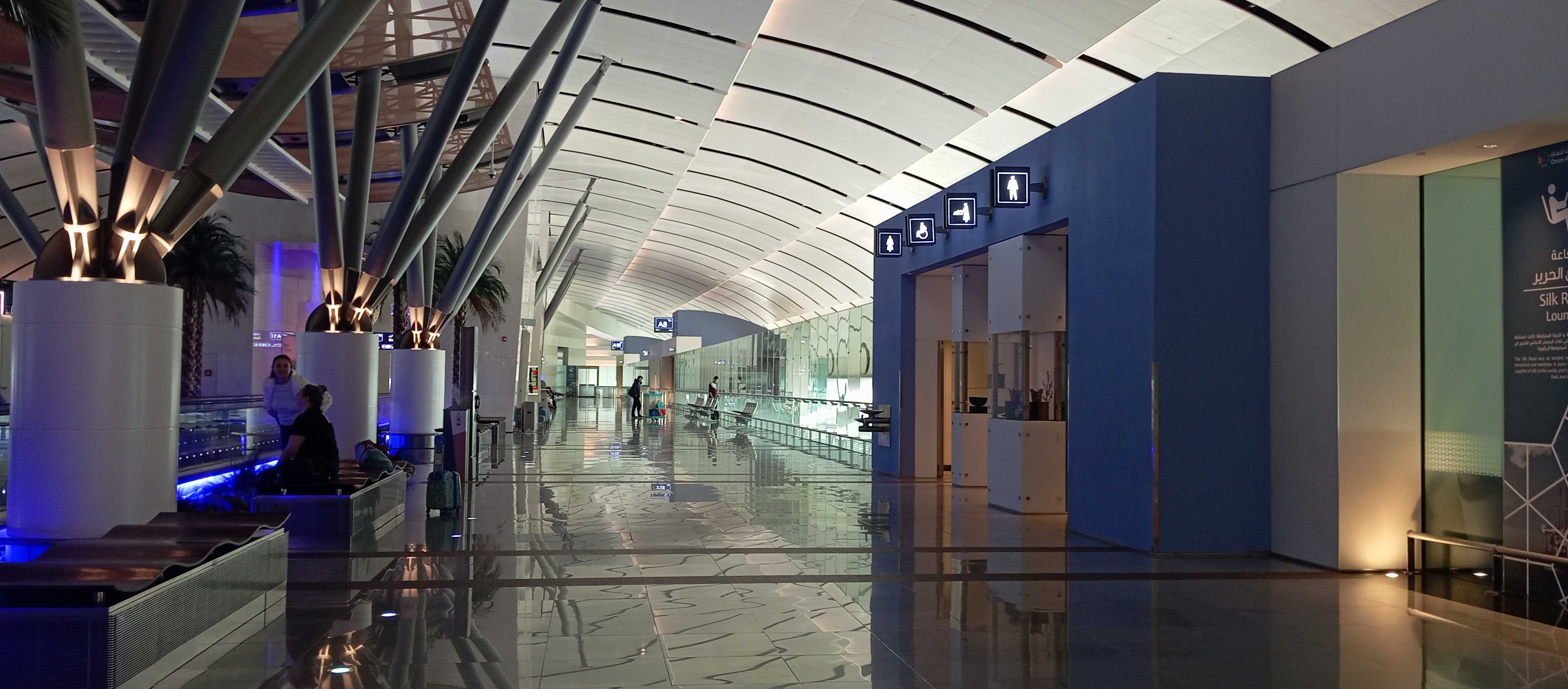
Departure Concourse at Terminal 1

==== Old Terminal 2 ====
Terminal 2 is a single-building, two-story, T-shaped passenger terminal. Built in 1970, it opened in 1973 as a replacement for the Bait al-Falaj airport and has been expanded several times over the last years to cater for growing passenger numbers. This terminal featured 58 check-in counters, 23 departure gates, four baggage reclaim belts, and several service counters and shops. A new pier was constructed in 2007, with additional shops, restaurants, and outlets, opening in 2009. During its years of operation, passengers and crew were transported to and from the aircraft using shuttle buses as the terminal offered no jet bridges.

The last international flight to depart from the old terminal was an Oman Air flight to Zurich, Switzerland, while another Oman Air flight bound for Salalah became the last domestic flight. The old facility was planned to be redeveloped into a low-cost carrier terminal, but was instead turned into a field hospital and COVID-19 vaccination site ever since the outbreak of the COVID-19 virus.

=== Runways and airport aprons ===
The airport features two runways: the original Runway 08R/26L and the second Runway 08L/26R, situated north of the new terminal building and inaugurated on 14 December 2014. Both runways are equipped to accommodate large aircraft, including the Boeing 747-8, Airbus A380, and the Antonov An-225. The original runway, situated between the new and the former passenger terminal, underwent closure in 2015 for refurbishment and expansion, aligning with the construction of a completely new main terminal building and an airport apron area. The refurbishment of the original runway was finalized in October 2023, and it officially resumed operations in November 2023.

The old terminal's apron features 32 stands on both sides of the T-shaped passenger terminal building, with 30 new ones constructed in two phases in front of the new terminal building, of which several were already in use as of September 2016.

== Airlines and destinations ==
=== Passenger ===
The following airlines operate regular scheduled and charter flights to and from Muscat:

| Airlines | Destinations |
|---|---|
| Air Arabia | Abu Dhabi, Cairo, Sharjah |
| Air India Express | Delhi, Kannur, Kochi, Kozhikode, Mangaluru, Mumbai–Shivaji, Thiruchirapalli, Thiruvananthapuram |
| Air Tanzania | Dar es Salaam, Zanzibar |
| Biman Bangladesh Airlines | Dhaka |
| China Eastern Airlines | Beijing–Daxing |
| Egyptair | Cairo |
| Emirates | Dubai–International |
| Ethiopian Airlines | Addis Ababa |
| Etihad Airways | Abu Dhabi |
| Fly Cham | Damascus |
| Flydubai | Dubai–International |
| Gulf Air | Bahrain |
| IndiGo | Hyderabad, Kochi, Mumbai–Shivaji |
| Iraqi Airways | Baghdad, Najaf |
| Kish Air | Chabahar/Konarak |
| Oman Air | Abu Dhabi, Amman, Amsterdam, Baghdad, Bahrain, Bangkok–Suvarnabhumi, Bengaluru, Cairo, Chennai, Dammam, Dar es Salaam, Delhi, Dhaka, Doha, Dubai–International, Frankfurt, Goa–Mopa, Hyderabad, Istanbul, Jakarta–Soekarno-Hatta, Jeddah, Karachi, Khasab, Kochi, Kozhikode, Kuala Lumpur–International, Kuwait City, London–Heathrow, Lucknow, Manila, Medina, Milan–Malpensa, Moscow–Sheremetyevo, Mumbai–Shivaji, Munich, Paris–Charles de Gaulle, Phuket, Riyadh, Rome–Fiumicino, Salalah, Singapore, Sochi, Taif, Tashkent, Thiruvananthapuram, Zanzibar, Zurich; Seasonal: Malé, Trabzon |
| Pakistan International Airlines | Islamabad, Karachi |
| Pegasus Airlines | Istanbul–Sabiha Gökçen |
| Qatar Airways | Doha |
| Qeshm Air | Tehran–Imam Khomeini |
| Red Wings Airlines | Seasonal charter: Sochi |
| SalamAir | Abha, Baghdad, Bangkok–Suvarnabhumi, Bengaluru, Beirut, Copenhagen, Chennai, Chittagong, Colombo, Damascus, Dammam, Dhaka, Doha, Duqm, Giza, Hyderabad, Islamabad, Jaipur, Kigali, Jeddah, Karachi, Kozhikode, Kuwait City, Lahore, Lucknow, Mogadishu, Masirah Island, Medina, Medan, Multan, Mumbai–Shivaji, Nairobi, Peshawar, Port Sudan, Riyadh, Salalah, Sharjah, Shiraz, Tehran–Imam Khomeini, Vienna; Seasonal: Almaty, Phuket, Prague, Sarajevo, Trabzon |
| Sepehran Airlines | Mashhad, Tehran–Imam Khomeini |
| Smartwings Poland | Seasonal charter: Colombo–Bandaranaike, Warsaw–Chopin |
| Taban Air | Shiraz |
| Turkish Airlines | Istanbul |
| US-Bangla Airlines | Chittagong, Dhaka, Sylhet |
| Varesh Airlines | Tehran–Imam Khomeini |

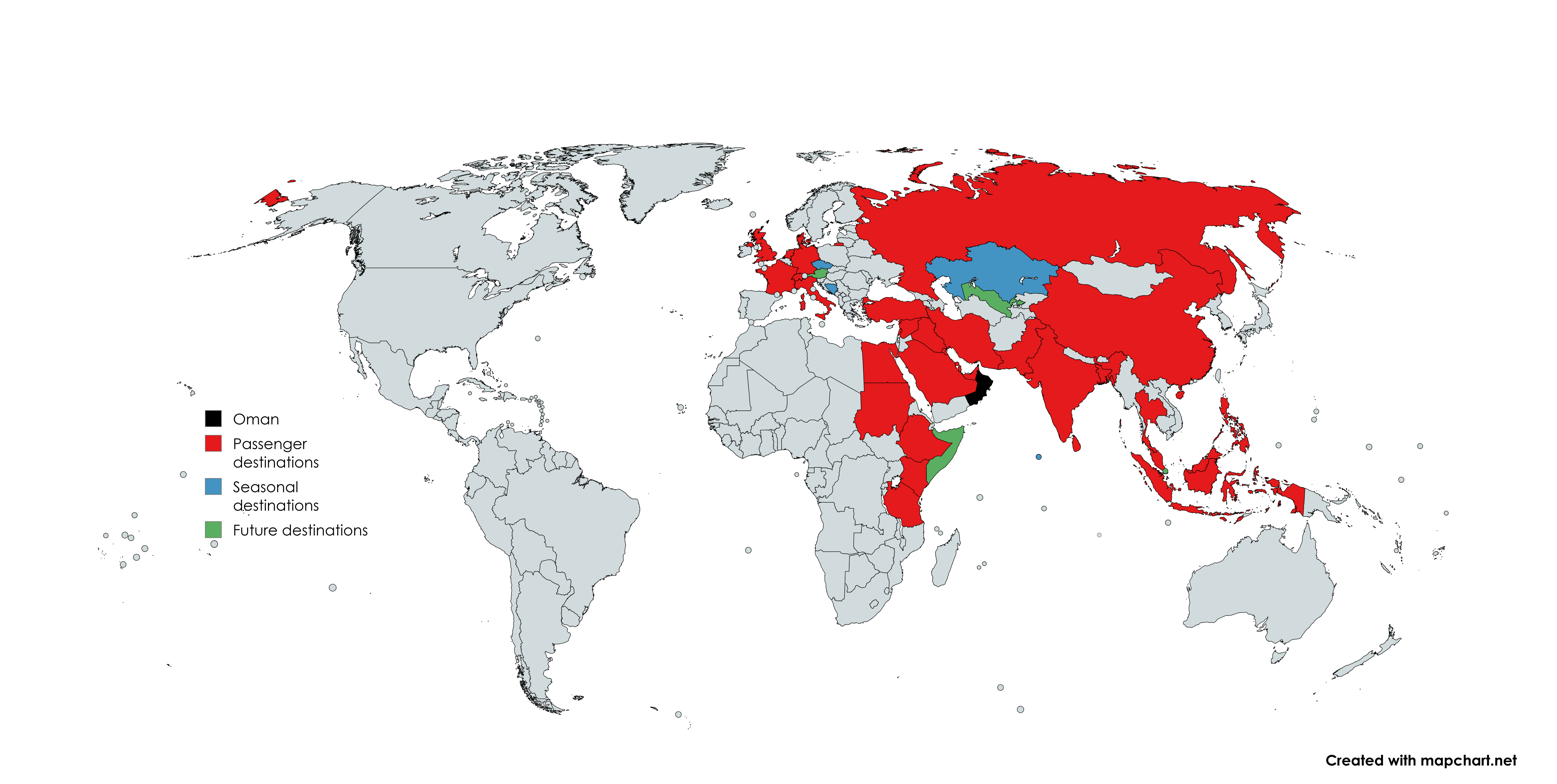
Red shows regular passenger destinations; blue shows seasonal destinations; green shows future destinations; black indicates Oman, where the airport is located

== Accidents and incidents ==
- 1986 Indian Air Force An-32 disappearance – On 25 March 1986, an Antonov An-32 operated by the Indian Air Force en route from Muscat to Jamnagar disappeared over the Arabian Sea. Despite all efforts, the cause remains Inconclusive.
- 2017 Bombardier Challenger 604 accident – On 7 January 2017, a Bombardier Challenger 604 operated by MHS Aviation had wake turbulence from an Emirates Airbus A380; the aircraft sustained a serious damage, and two serious injuries were reported. Consequently, the airplane landed safely at Muscat. All 9 occupants survived the accident.
- On 19 July 2024, a Cham Wings Airlines Airbus A320 operating arriving from Damascus International Airport departed the runway after landing when the crew lost control of the aircraft due to a steering malfunction. There were no injuries and the aircraft suffered minor damage.
- An Air India Express Boeing 737-800 operating as IX-712 to Kannur International Airport suffered significant damage at Runway 26L during take-off roll on 15 May 2026 at 9:10pm. The aircraft, after entering the runway from taxiway E7, had lined up with the right-hand edge lights instead of the centerline. Oman’s Air Accidents Investigation Sector (AAIS) has classified the occurrence as an accident and launched an investigation.

== Statistics ==
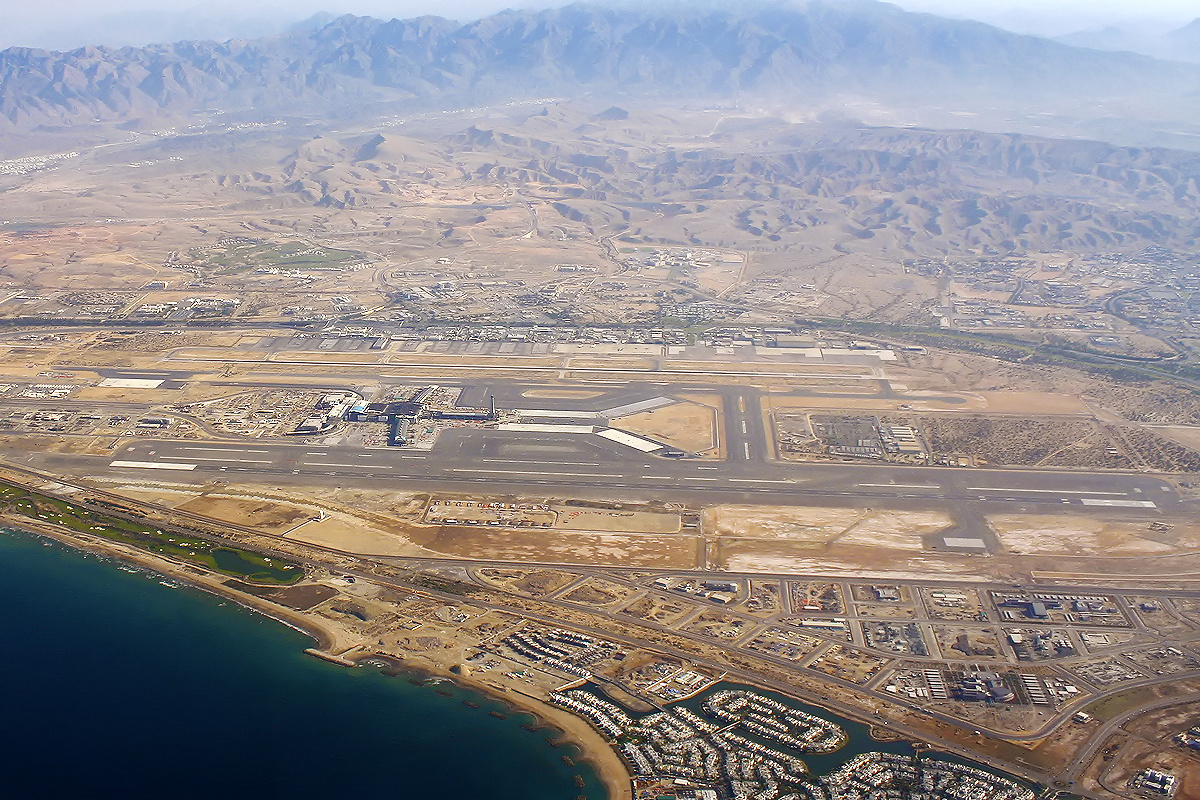
Aerial view of the entire airport showing the new terminal in the center with the old facilities on top

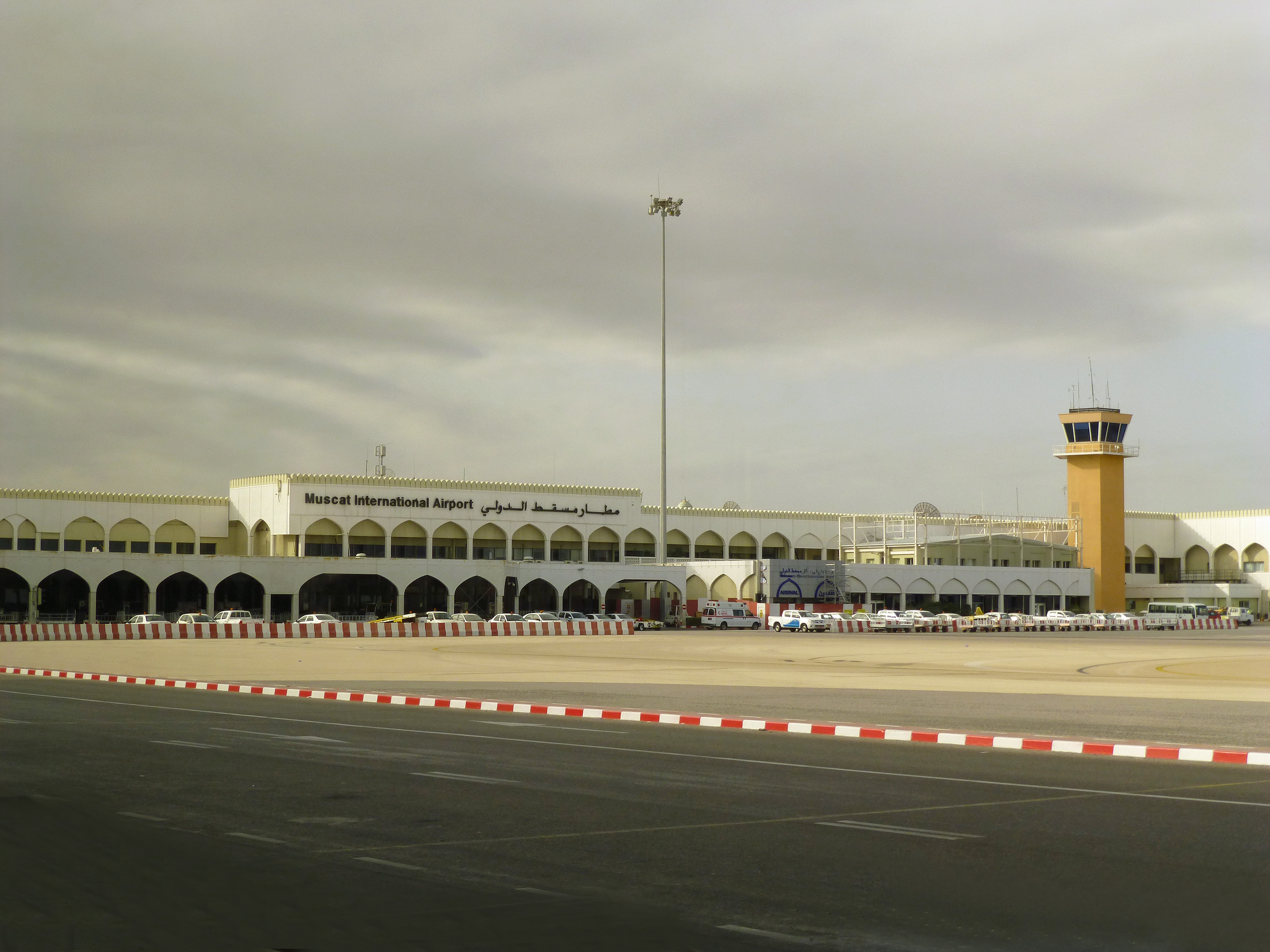
Terminal 2, the former main building

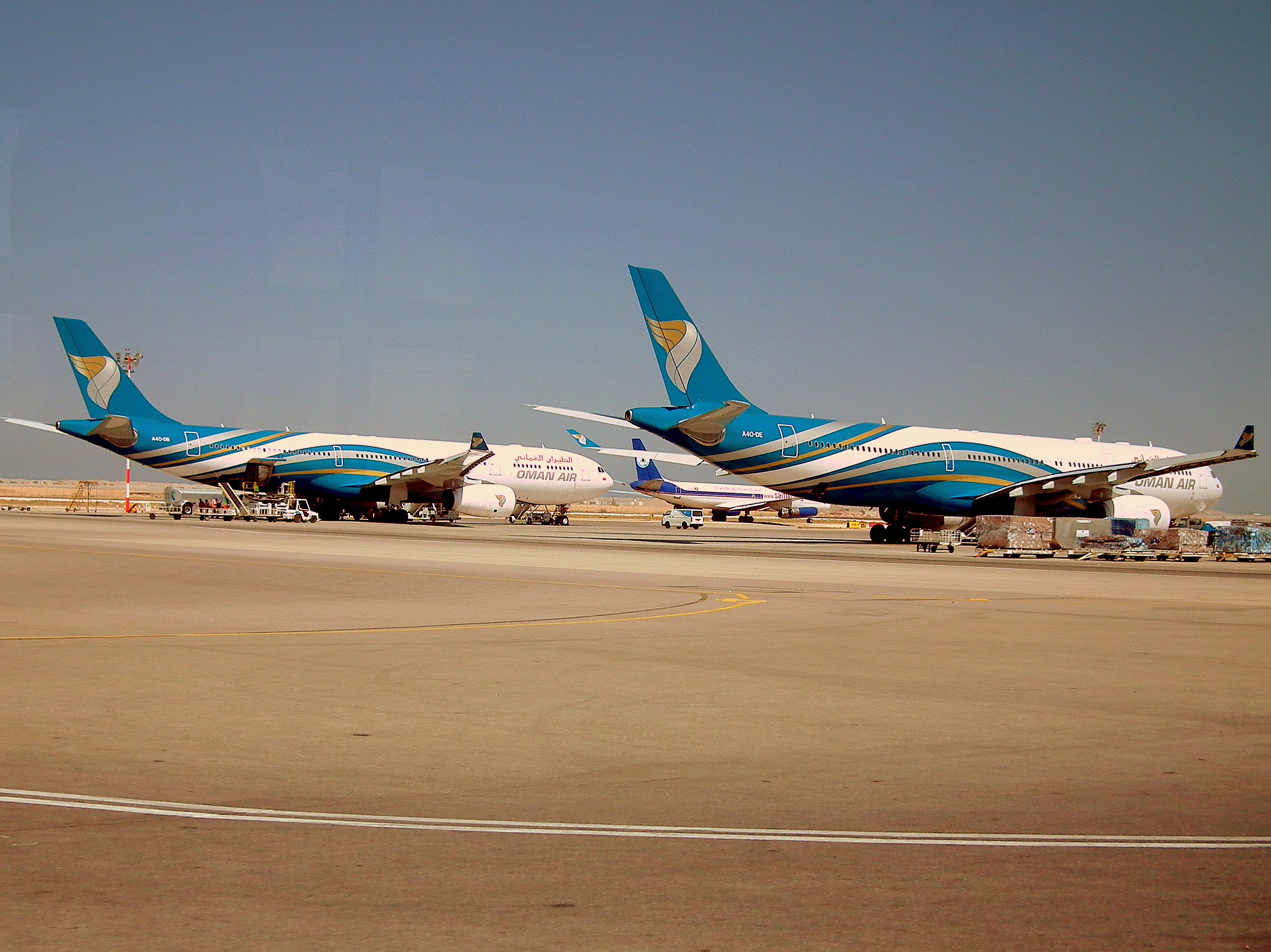
Oman Air Airbus A330-300s parked on the apron of the old terminal. Until the opening of the new terminal, there were no jetbridges available.

Annual passenger and freight total
| Year | Passengers | Freight in MT | Aircraft movements |
|---|---|---|---|
| 2025 | 13,157,966 ▲ | 161,607 ▼ | 91,841 |
| 2024 | 12,863,576 ▲ | 169,674 ▲ | 95,340 |
| 2023 | 12,599,545 ▲ | 168,824 ▲ | 95,490 |
| 2022 | 8,605,479 ▲ | 157,872 ▲ | 68,622 |
| 2021 | 3,748,526 ▼ | 112,733 ▲ | 33,223 |
| 2020 | 4,085,499 ▼ | 109,806 ▼ | 35,188 |
| 2019 | 16,038,844 ▲ | 240,285 ▲ | 117,601 |
| 2018 | 15,392,095 ▲ | 212,764 ▲ | 118,698 |
| 2017 | 14,061,732 ▲ | 200,852 ▲ | 114,360 |
| 2016 | 12,031,496 ▲ | 180,332 ▲ | 103,326 |
| 2015 | 10,315,358 ▲ | 154,868 ▲ | 103,915 |
| 2014 | 8,709,505 ▲ | 121,368 ▲ | 92,347 |
| 2013 | 8,310,927 ▲ | 120,667 ▲ | 90,223 |
| 2012 | 7,546,716 ▲ | 112,306 ▲ | 81,486 |
| 2011 | 6,479,860 ▲ | 98,085 ▲ | 78,650 |
| 2010 | 5,752,017 ▲ | 96,696 ▲ | 79,710 |
| 2009 | 4,558,002 ▲ | 63,764 ▲ | 66,872 |
| 2008 | 4,001,393 ▼ | 57,887 ▼ | 58,346 |
| 2007 | 4,219,000 ▼ | 76,448 ▼ | 49,806 |
| 2006 | 4,778,000 ▲ | 97,908 ▲ | 49,901 |
| 2005 | 4,071,000 ▲ | 76,563 ▲ | 52,781 |
| 2004 | 3,461,000▲ | 67,151 ▲ | 43,622 |
| 2003 | 2,886,000 ▲ | 48,630 ▲ | 42,330 |
| 2002 | 2,447,000 ▼ | 46,934 ▼ | 39,555 |
| 2001 | 2,700,992 ▼ | 71,830 ▲ | 35,064 |
| 2000 | 2,721,393 | 69,696 | 36,082 |

== Ground transport ==
Oman National Transport Company (Mwasalat) operates 24-hour service special airport buses at fixed intervals. The Route A1 operates between Mabela and Ruwi bus station with a stop at Muscat Airport. Bus Route 8 (Al Mouj-Al Khuwair) also has a stop at Muscat Airport. Metered-airport taxis are available with special counters at the baggage and arrival halls. Car rental and chauffeur services are also available.

== See also ==
- List of the busiest airports in the Middle East
