= Netherlands Airport Consultants =

- Trade name: NACO
- Industry: Airports
- Founded: 1949
- Founder: Dr. Albert Plesman
- Headquarters: The Hague, Netherlands
- Area served: Worldwide
- Services: Consultancy services
- Website: www.naco.nl
- Footnotes / references NACO is part of the Business line Maritime & Aviation within Royal HaskoningDHV

Netherlands Airport Consultants (NACO) is an airport consultancy and engineering firm. NACO is headquartered in The Hague, Netherlands and has branches and/or local presence in South Africa, Mexico, Taiwan and the United Arab Emirates. The company is part of Royal HaskoningDHV.

== History ==
NACO was established in 1949 by Dr. Albert Plesman, founder and director-president of Royal Dutch Airlines. He foresaw that after World War II, specialized know-how was needed to reconstruct airports in the Netherlands and abroad, and promoted the bundling of expertise available in the Netherlands. During the first few years of its existence, NACO worked on various projects in the Netherlands, Netherlands Antilles, Indonesia, Egypt and Germany. NACO began to play a directive role in the development of Amsterdam Airport Schiphol in the early 1960s. The years that followed have been marked by organisational growth and expansion of international activities that have seen NACO engaged in projects in over 600 airports around the world.

== Projects ==
- 1960–present: Amsterdam Airport Schiphol
- 1975–1981: Singapore Changi Airport
- 1992–2000: Second Bangkok International Airport
- 2003–2007: Beijing Capital International Airport Terminal 3
- 2009–2011: Kuala Lumpur International Airport
- 2012–2014: Viracopos International Airport
- 2015–present: New international airport for Mexico City
- 2016–present: Tehran Imam Khomeini International Airport
