= Beijing Capital International Airport =

International airport in China

Beijing Capital International Airport 北京首都国际机场

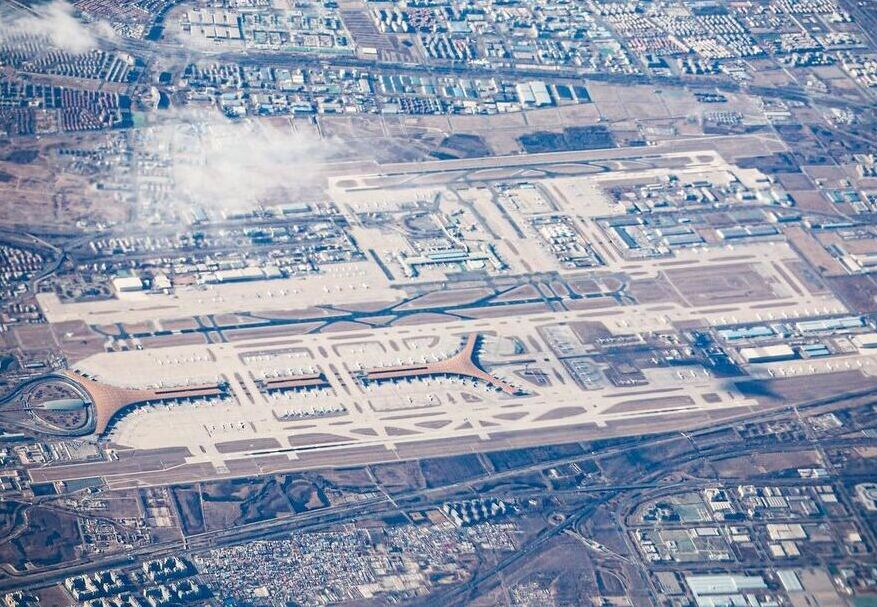
- Aerial view of the airport
- IATA: PEK; ICAO: ZBAA; WMO: 54511

Summary
- Airport type: Public
- Owner/Operator: Beijing Capital International Airport Company Limited
- Serves: Beijing
- Location: Shunyi District, Beijing, China
- Opened: 1 March 1958; 68 years ago
- Hub for: Air China; Hainan Airlines; SF Airlines
- Focus city for: Sichuan Airlines; Shenzhen Airlines; Shandong Airlines
- Elevation AMSL: 116 ft (35 m)
- Coordinates: 40°04′21″N 116°35′51″E
- Website: www.bcia.com.cn en.bcia.com.cn

Maps
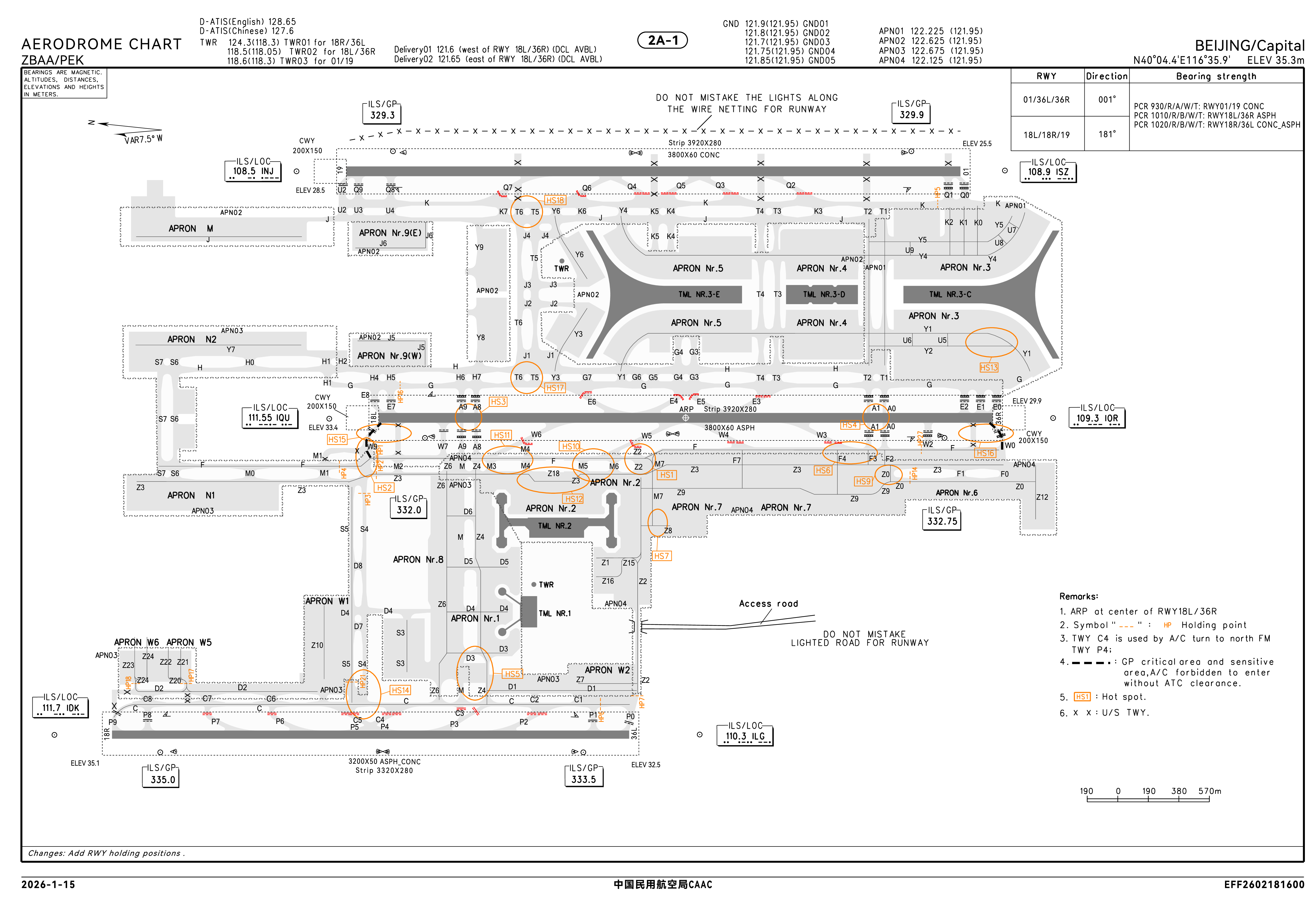
- CAAC airport chart

- Location in Beijing Location in China

Runways
Direction	Length		Surface
Direction	m	ft	Surface
18L/36R	3,810	12,500	Asphalt
18R/36L	3,445	11,302	Asphalt
01/19	3,810	12,500	Concrete

Statistics (2025)
- Passengers: 70,742,712 ▲5.0%
- Aircraft movements: 442,046 ▲2.0%
- Cargo (metric tons): 1,550,926.2 ▲7.5%
- Sources:, China's busiest airports by passenger traffic by CAAC

Beijing Capital International Airport (IATA: PEK, ICAO: ZBAA) is the busier of the two international airports serving Beijing, the capital city of China (the other one being Beijing Daxing International Airport). The airport is located 32 km (20 mi) northeast of downtown Beijing, in an exclave of Chaoyang and the surroundings of that exclave in suburban Shunyi. The airport is owned and operated by the Beijing Capital International Airport Company Limited, a state-controlled company. The airport's IATA Airport code, PEK, is based on the city's former romanized name, Peking. The facility covers an area of 1,480 hectares (3,657 acres) of airport property. It was opened in 1958.

== History ==
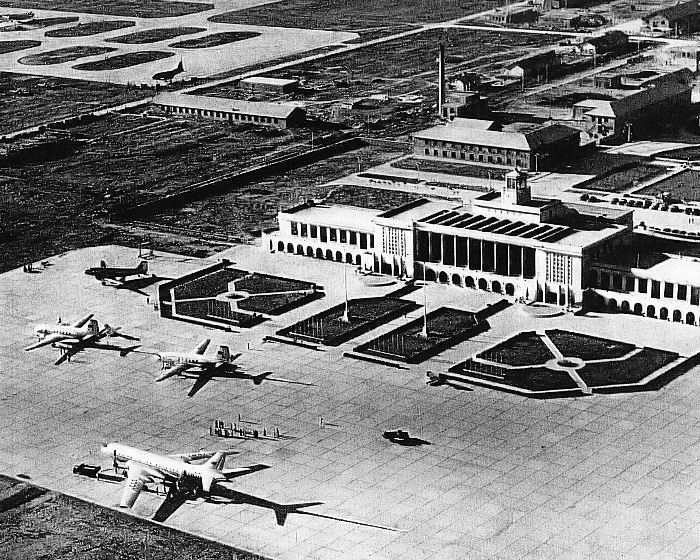
Capital Airport in 1959

Beijing Capital International Airport
- Simplified Chinese: 北京首都国际机场
- Traditional Chinese: 北京首都國際機場
Transcriptions
Standard Mandarin
- Hanyu Pinyin: Běijīng Shǒudū Guójì Jīchǎng
- Wade–Giles: Pei^{3}-ching^{1} Shou^{3}-tu^{1} Kuo^{2}-chi^{4} Chi^{1}-chʻang^{3}
- IPA: [pèɪ.tɕíŋ.ʂòʊ.tú.kwǒ.tɕî.tɕí.ʈʂʰàŋ]
Wu
- Romanization: Pok^{入} cin^{平} Seu^{上} tu^{平} Kok^{入} ji^{平} Ji^{平} zaan^{去}
Hakka
- Pha̍k-fa-sṳ: Pet-kîn Sú-tû Koet-chi Kî-chhòng
Yue: Cantonese
- Yale Romanization: Bākgīng Sáudōu Gwokjai Gēichèuhng
- Jyutping: bak1 ging1 sau2 dou1 gwok3 zai3 gei1 coeng4
- IPA: [pɐk̚˥.kɪŋ˥.sɐw˧˥.tɔw˥.kʷɔk̚˧.tsɐj˧.kej˥.tsʰœŋ˩]
Southern Min
- Hokkien POJ: Pak-kiaⁿ Siú-to͘ Kok-chè Ki-tiûⁿ
Eastern Min
- Fuzhou BUC: Báe̤k-gĭng Siū-dŭ Guók-cié Gĭ-diòng

Beijing Airport was opened on 1 March 1958. The airport then consisted of one small terminal building, which still stands to this day, apparently for the use of VIPs and charter flights, along with a single 2,500-meter (8,200 ft) runway on its eastern side, which was extended to 3,200 meters (10,500 ft) in 1966 and 3,800 meters (12,500 ft) in 1982 respectively.

In 2013, Beijing Capital International Airport handled 83.7 million passengers, making it the second busiest airport in the world that year. Prior to 2003, it had not ranked among the world’s 20 busiest airports.

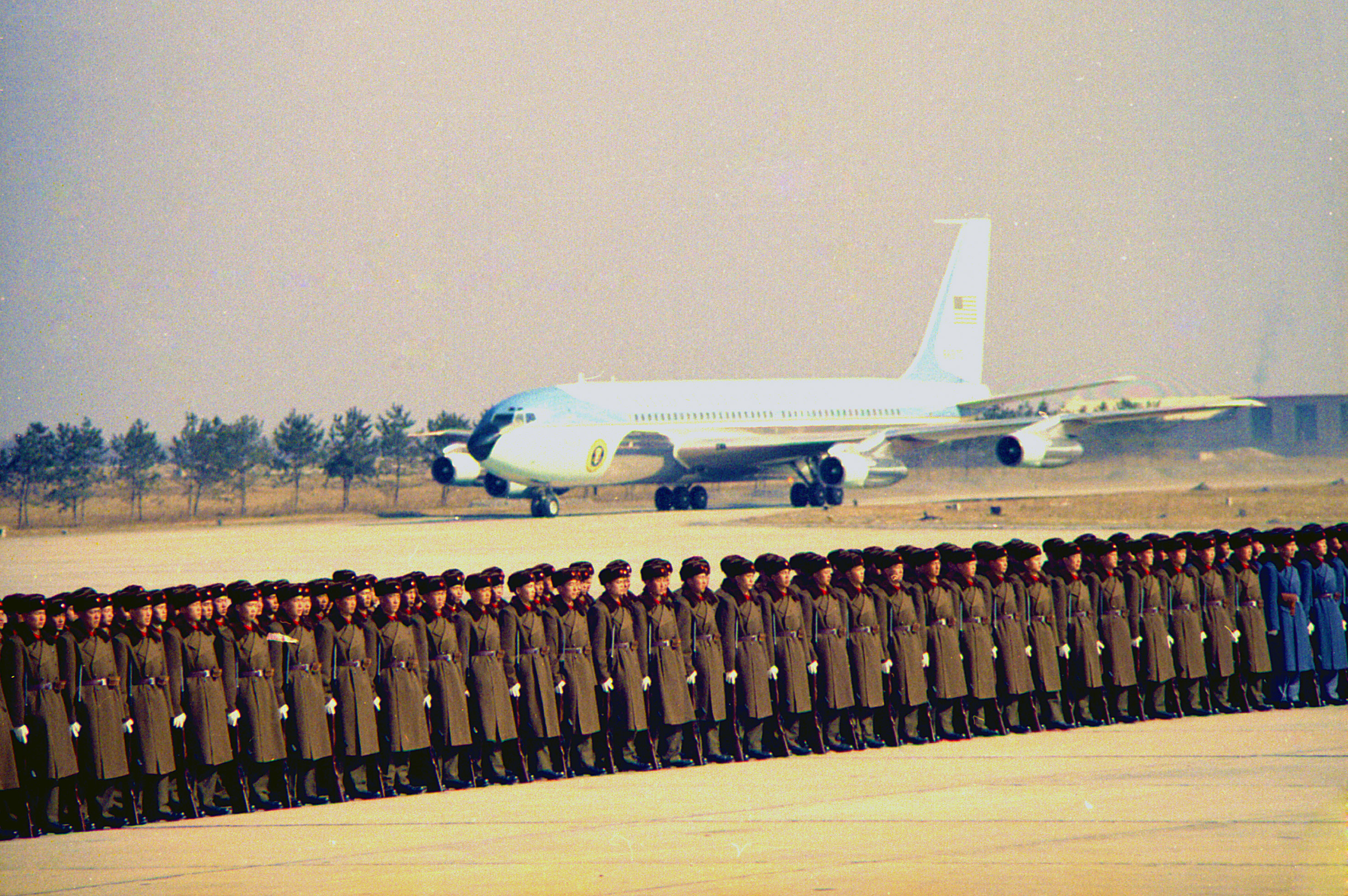
Capital Airport in 1972, when an Air Force One carrying US President Richard Nixon arrived at Beijing on 21 February

In late 1999, to mark the 50th anniversary of the founding of the PRC, the airport underwent a new round of expansion. Terminal 2 opened on 1 November of that year and Terminal 1 was temporarily closed for renovation. 20 September 2004 saw the opening of the renovated Terminal 1 which, at that time, only handled China Southern Airlines' domestic and international flights from Beijing. Other airlines' domestic and international flights still operated in Terminal 2.

More expansion began in 2007. A third runway opened on 29 October 2007, to relieve congestion on the other two runways. Terminal 3 (T3) was completed in February 2008, in time for the 2008 Beijing Summer Olympics. The significant expansion included a rail link to the city center.

At the time of its opening, Terminal 3 was the largest airport passenger terminal building in the world by floor area. The expansion was largely funded by a 30 billion yen loan from Japan and a 500-million-euro (US$625 million) loan from the European Investment Bank (EIB). The loan was the largest ever granted by the EIB in Asia, and the agreement was signed during the eighth China-EU Summit held in September 2005.

Following the 2008 Summer Olympics and the addition of adding the new terminal building, Beijing Capital overtook Tokyo Haneda as the busiest airport in Asia based on scheduled seat capacity.

Due to limited capacity of Beijing Capital International Airport, plans were announced for the construction of a new airport at Daxing. The project was given final approval on 13 January 2013. Construction began in late 2014 and was completed in 2019. The new Daxing Airport became the Beijing home of China Eastern Airlines, China Southern Airlines, and China United Airlines, while Air China and Hainan Airlines remained at Capital.

== Terminals ==
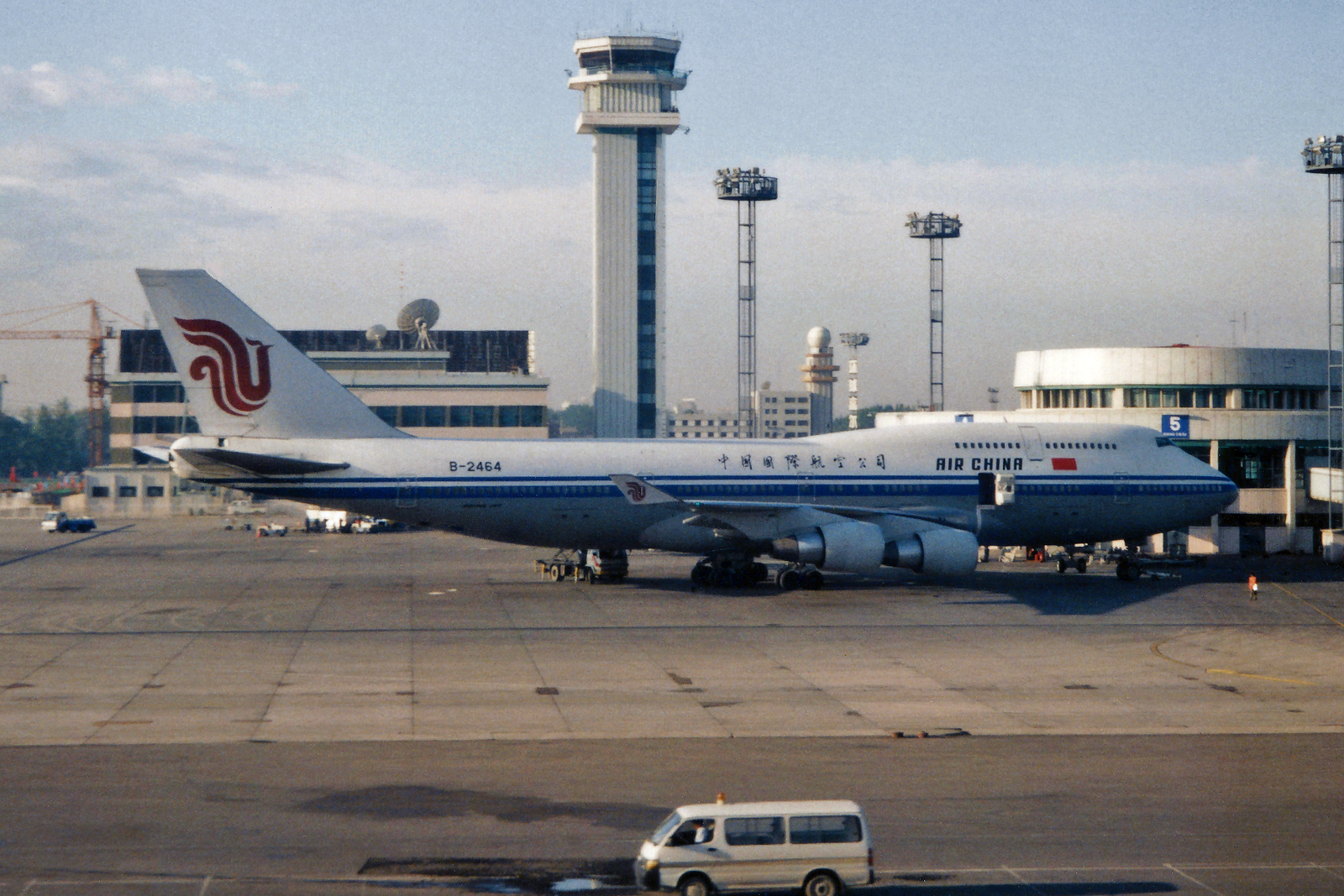
Capital Airport in 1997

Shuttle buses connect the airport's three terminals. Terminal 2 serves Hainan Airlines and SkyTeam with the exception of China Airlines, Oneworld member SriLankan Airlines, and also other domestic and international flights. Terminal 3, the newest terminal, serves Air China, Star Alliance, Oneworld members with the exception of SriLankan Airlines, plus SkyTeam member China Airlines, and some other domestic and international flights that do not operate from Terminals 2.

=== Terminal 2 ===
Terminal 2 opened on 1 November 1999, with a floor area of 336,000 m^{2} (3,620,000 sq ft). This terminal was used to replace Terminal 1 while the latter was undergoing renovation, cramping all airlines despite being far bigger than Terminal 1. It can handle twenty aircraft at docks connecting directly to the terminal building. Prior to the opening of Terminal 3, all international flights (and the majority of domestic flights) operated from this terminal. This terminal now houses Hainan Airlines (all international, Hong Kong, Macau, and Taiwan flights), SkyTeam with the exception of China Airlines, which uses Terminal 3, Oneworld member SriLankan Airlines, Air Koryo, and other domestic and international flights other than those operated by Shanghai Airlines, Star Alliance members and Oneworld members. A gate capable of handling the A380 (gate 21) was also built at the terminal. Star Alliance member Air China also uses Terminal 2 for some of its domestic flights.

Terminals 1 and 2 are linked by a public walkway that takes about 10–15 minutes to traverse.

==== Westwing Satellite Terminal (formerly Terminal 1) ====
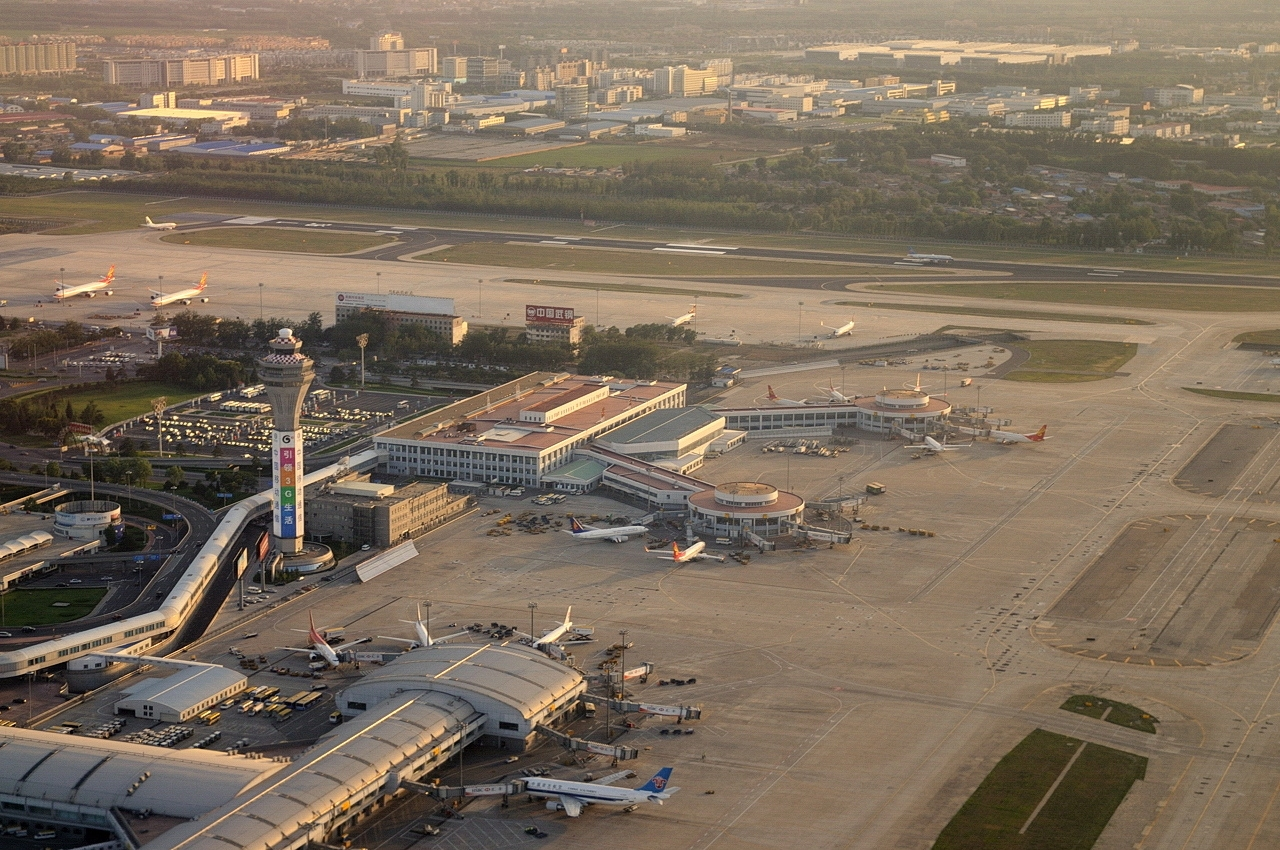
Aerial view of PEK Terminal 1 and 2

Terminal 1, with 60,000 m^{2} (650,000 sq ft) of space, opened on 1 January 1980, and replaced the smaller existing terminal, which had been in operation since 1958. Terminal 1 was closed for renovation from 1 November 1999 to 20 September 2004, during which all airlines operated from Terminal 2. Featuring 16 gates, it was the operational base for the domestic routes of China Southern Airlines and a few other airlines such as XiamenAir and Chongqing Airlines, and was originally planned to handle domestic traffic excluding those to Hong Kong and Macau.

With the opening of Terminal 3, the terminal was closed for light refurbishment, and its airlines were moved to Terminal 2 on 20 May 2008. Terminal 1 reopened for a second time on 27 June 2008, and became the operational base for all domestic flights operated by the HNA Group including those of Hainan Airlines, Grand China Air and Tianjin Airlines, while all HNA Group's international, Hong Kong, Macau, and Taiwan flights remain in Terminal 2.

On 3 May 2020, Terminal 1 was closed again for renovation after Hainan Airlines moved its all domestic routes to Terminal 2. The Terminal 1 was reopened on 1 August 2023 as Westwing Satellite Terminal as part of Terminal 2.

=== Terminal 3 ===
Construction of Terminal 3 started on 28 March 2004, and the terminal opened in two stages. Trial operations commenced on 29 February 2008, when seven airlines including El Al, Qantas, Qatar Airways, Shandong Airlines and Sichuan Airlines moved into the terminal. Twenty other airlines followed when the terminal became fully operational on 26 March 2008. Currently, it mainly houses Air China, Star Alliance, Oneworld with the exception of SriLankan Airlines, which uses Terminal 2, SkyTeam member China Airlines, and other domestic and international flights that are not operated from Terminal 2. Star Alliance members LOT Polish Airlines, Scandinavian Airlines, Lufthansa, Austrian Airlines, United Airlines, Air Canada, Turkish Airlines, Thai Airways International, Singapore Airlines, All Nippon Airways, Asiana Airlines and Air China use Terminal 3-E as part of the Move Under One Roof program to co-locate alliance members.

Terminal 3 was designed by a consortium of Netherlands Airport Consultants (NACO), Foster + Partners, Arup and the Beijing Institute of Architectural Design (BIAD). Lighting was designed by UK lighting architects Speirs and Major Associates. The budget for the expansion is US$3.5 billion. Much larger in size and scale than the other two terminals, Terminal 3 was the largest airport terminal-building complex in the world to be built in a single phase, with 986,000 m^{2} (10,610,000 sq ft) in total floor area at its opening. It features a main passenger terminal (Terminal 3C) and two satellite concourses (Terminal 3D and Terminal 3E), all of the five floors above ground and two underground, with the letters "A and B" omitted to avoid confusion with the existing Terminals 1 and 2. Only two concourses were initially opened, namely, Terminal 3C dedicated for domestic flights and Terminal 3E for international flights. Terminal 3D officially opened on 18 April 2013. The newly opened concourse is temporarily used solely by Air China for some of its domestic flights.

At the time of its opening, Terminal 3 was the largest airport passenger terminal building in the world. Its title as the world's largest passenger terminal was surrendered on 14 October 2008 to Dubai International Airport's Terminal 3, which has 1,713,000 m^{2} (18,440,000 sq ft) of floor space.

On 20 July 2013, a man in a wheelchair detonated small homemade explosives in Terminal 3 of the Beijing International Airport. The bomber, reported to be Ji Zhongxing, was injured and taken to a hospital for his injuries. No other people were hurt.

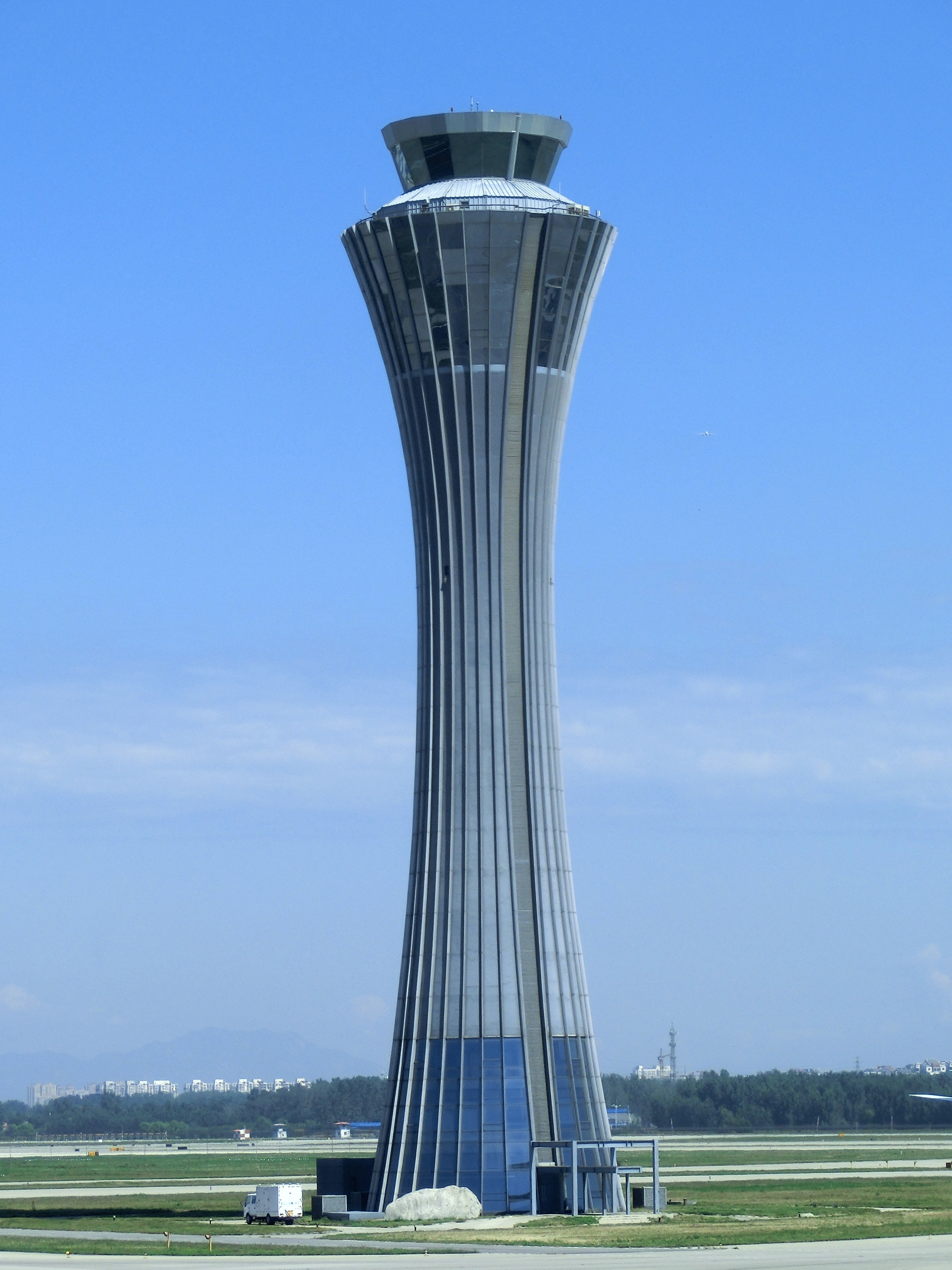
The control tower at Beijing Capital International Airport

==== Appearance ====
The highest building at the airport, a 98.3 m (323 ft) monitoring tower, stands at the southern end of T3. The roof of T3 is red, the Chinese color for good luck. The terminal's ceilings use white strips for decoration and to indicate directions. Under the white strips, the basic color of the ceiling is orange with light to dark tones indicating where a passenger is inside the building. The roof is light orange in the center. The color deepens as the roof extends to the sides in T3E and goes the other way round in T3C.

The roof of T3 has dozens of triangular windows to let in the daylight. Light angles can be adjusted to ensure adequate interior lighting. Many traditional Chinese elements will be employed in the terminal's interior decoration, including a "Menhai", a big copper vat used to store water for fighting fires in the Forbidden City, and the carvings imitating the famous Nine-Dragon Wall.

An indoor garden in the T3E waiting area is built in the style of imperial gardens such as the Summer Palace. In T3C, a tunnel landscape of an underground garden has been finished with plants on each side so that passengers can appreciate them inside the mini-train.

==== Facilities ====
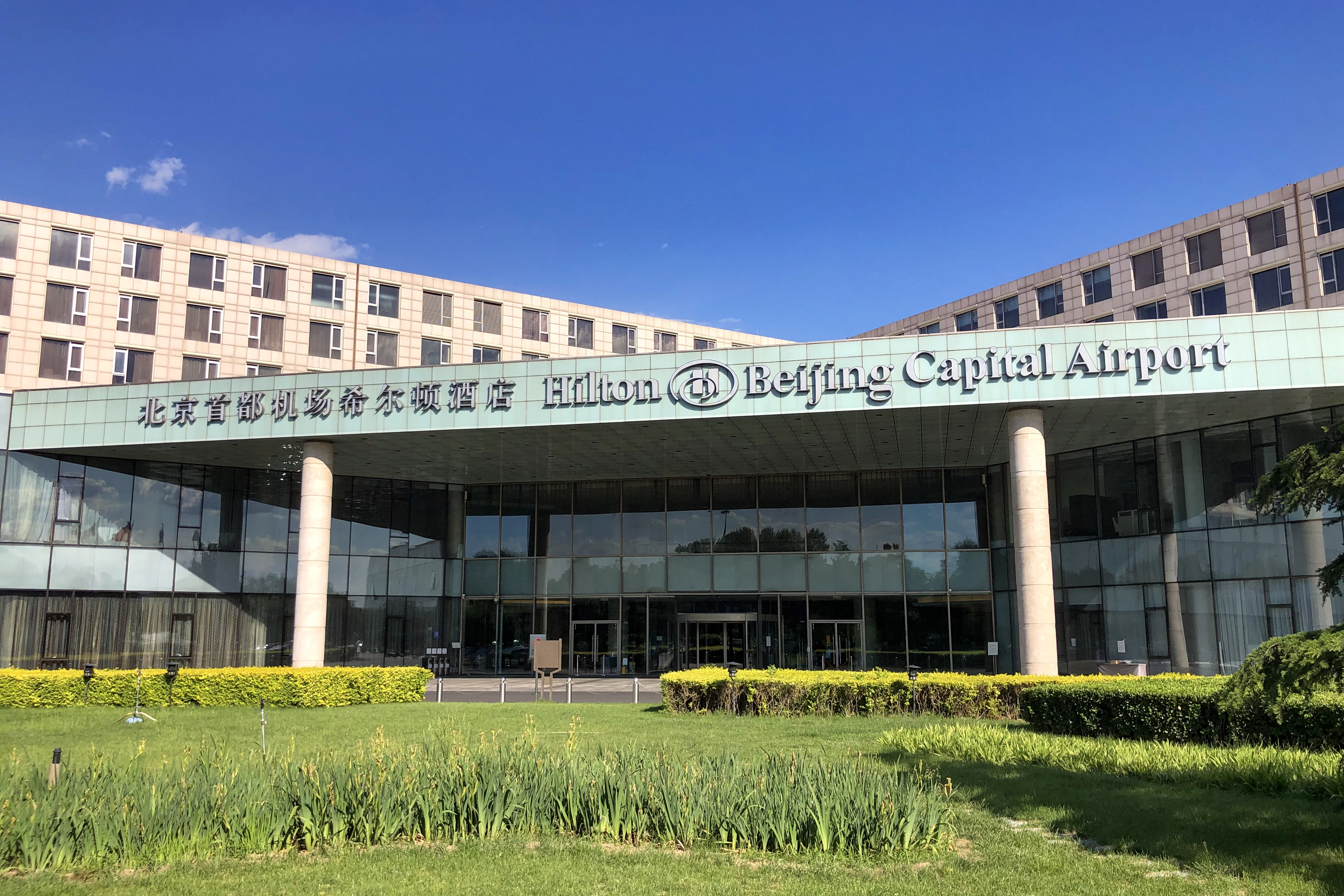
Hilton Beijing Capital Airport

The T3 food-service area is called a "global kitchen", where 72 stores provide food ranging from formal dishes to fast food, from Chinese to Western, and from bakery goods to ice cream. Airport officials have promised that people who buy products at the airport will find the same prices in central Beijing. In addition to food and beverage areas, there is a 16,200 m^{2} (174,000 sq ft) domestic retail area, a 12,600 m^{2} (136,000 sq ft) duty-free-store area and a nearly 7,200 m^{2} (78,000 sq ft) convenience-service area, which includes banks, business centers, Internet services and more. At 45,200 m^{2} (487,000 sq ft), the commercial area is twice the size of Beijing's Lufthansa Shopping Center.

The terminal provides 72 aerobridges or jetways and is further complemented with remote parking bays that bring the total number of gates to 150. Terminal 3 comes with an additional runway. It increases BCIA's total capacity by 72 million passengers per year to approximately 90 million.

==== Airbus A380 ====
The terminal has gates and a nearby runway that can handle the Airbus A380. This capability was proven when Singapore Airlines briefly offered A380 flights to Beijing in August 2008 during the Summer Olympics. Emirates started its scheduled daily operation to Dubai on 1 August 2010. Singapore Airlines has been using an A380 since June 2014 and increased to two A380s in 2015. China Southern Airlines operated two flights to Guangzhou Baiyun Airport, Chongqing Jiangbei Airport, and Amsterdam Schiphol Airport starting from 2011, 2013, and 2015 before retiring them in 2023.

== Airlines and destinations ==
=== Passenger ===
Airlines	Destinations
Air Algérie	Algiers
Air Canada	Vancouver
Air China	Almaty, Abu Dhabi, Bangkok–Suvarnabhumi, Baotou, Bayannur, Beihai, Bishkek, Brussels, Bucharest–Otopeni, Budapest, Cairo, Copenhagen, Dandong, Delhi–Indira Gandhi, Dhaka, Dunhuang, Fuzhou, Ganzhou, Guilin, Hanzhong, Hanoi, Havana, Hengyang, Hohhot, Hong Kong, Huangshan, Huizhou, Irkutsk, Istanbul, Jiamusi, Jiaxing, Chengdu-Shuangliu, Jieyang, Jiuzhaigou, Lianyungang, Lishui, Liuzhou, London–Gatwick, Melbourne, Montréal–Trudeau (resumes 29 March 2027), Munich, Nanning, Phuket, Pyongyang, Quzhou, Riyadh, Reykjavik-Keflavík, San Francisco, São Paulo–Guarulhos, Suifenhe, Sydney–Kingsford Smith, Tashkent, Tongliao, Toronto–Pearson, Ulaanbaatar, Vancouver, Venice, Vladivostok, Washington–Dulles, Yantai, Zagreb, Zhanjiang, Zhuhai, Zunyi–Maotai
Air France	Paris–Charles de Gaulle
Air Koryo	Pyongyang
All Nippon Airways	Tokyo–Haneda
Asiana Airlines	Seoul–Gimpo, Seoul–Incheon
Azerbaijan Airlines	Baku
Cathay Pacific	Hong Kong
China Airlines	Taipei–Taoyuan
China Eastern Airlines	Shanghai–Pudong
Dalian Airlines	Dalian,Xiamen, Xi'an
Egyptair	Cairo
Emirates	Dubai–International
Ethiopian Airlines	Addis Ababa
EVA Air	Taipei–Taoyuan
Grand China Air	Anqing, Jiujiang
Hainan Airlines	Altay, Belgrade, Berlin, Boston, Dublin, Edinburgh, Fuzhou, Irkutsk, Jixi, Kashgar, Langzhong, Longnan, Mexico City–Benito Juárez, Nanning, Oslo, Prague, Qianjiang, Qionghai, Saint Petersburg, Seattle/Tacoma, Tel Aviv, Tijuana, Toronto–Pearson, Vladivostok, Wuhu, Yueyang, Yulin (Guangxi)
Hong Kong Airlines	Hong Kong
Iraqi Airways	Basra
Japan Airlines	Tokyo–Haneda
KLM	Amsterdam
Korean Air	Busan, Jeju, Seoul–Gimpo, Seoul–Incheon
Lufthansa	Munich
MIAT Mongolian Airlines	Ulaanbaatar
Pakistan International Airlines	Islamabad
Philippine Airlines	Manila
Shandong Airlines	Fuzhou, Yantai, Zhuhai
Shenzhen Airlines	Chengdu–Tianfu, Guangzhou, Nanning, Quanzhou
Sichuan Airlines	Kashgar, Mianyang, Xishuangbanna, Yibin
Singapore Airlines	Singapore
Spring Japan	Tokyo–Narita
Thai Airways International	Bangkok–Suvarnabhumi
Turkish Airlines	Istanbul,
Turkmenistan Airlines	Ashgabat
United Airlines	Los Angeles, San Francisco
Vietnam Airlines	Hanoi
Xizang Airlines	Chengdu–Shuangliu, Qamdo

=== Cargo ===
Airlines	Destinations
Air China Cargo	Glasgow–Prestwick, Munich,
Etihad Cargo	Almaty
FedEx Express	Paris–Charles de Gaulle

== Ground transportation ==
=== Intraterminal transportation ===
Terminal 3 consists of three sub-concourses. Both domestic and international travellers check in at concourse T3C. Gates for domestic flights are in T3C, and gates for domestic flights operated by Air China are also located in concourse T3D. All international, Hong Kong, and Macau, and Taiwan flights are handled in concourse T3E.

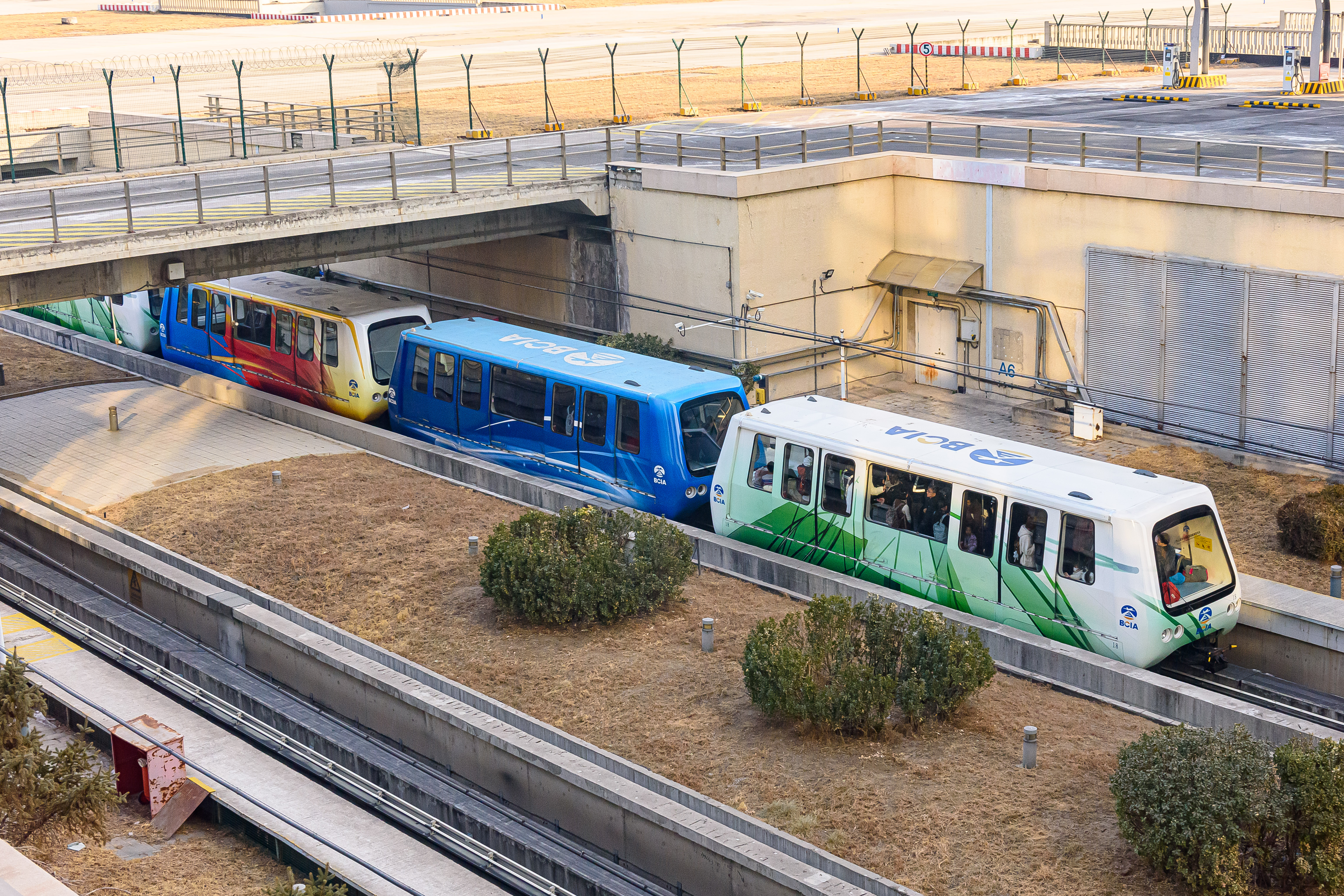
A Beijing Capital Airport Terminal 3 people mover

In conjunction with the construction of the new terminal, Bombardier Transportation installed a 2 km (1.2 mi) automated people mover which connects T3C and T3E via T3D in a 2–5-minute one-way trip. The line uses Innovia APM 100 vehicles running at 6-minute intervals at a maximum speed of 55 kilometers per hour (34 mph).

In July 2021, new Innovia APM 300 vehicles were delivered to the Beijing Capital International Airport Terminal 3 People Mover.

=== Interterminal transportation ===
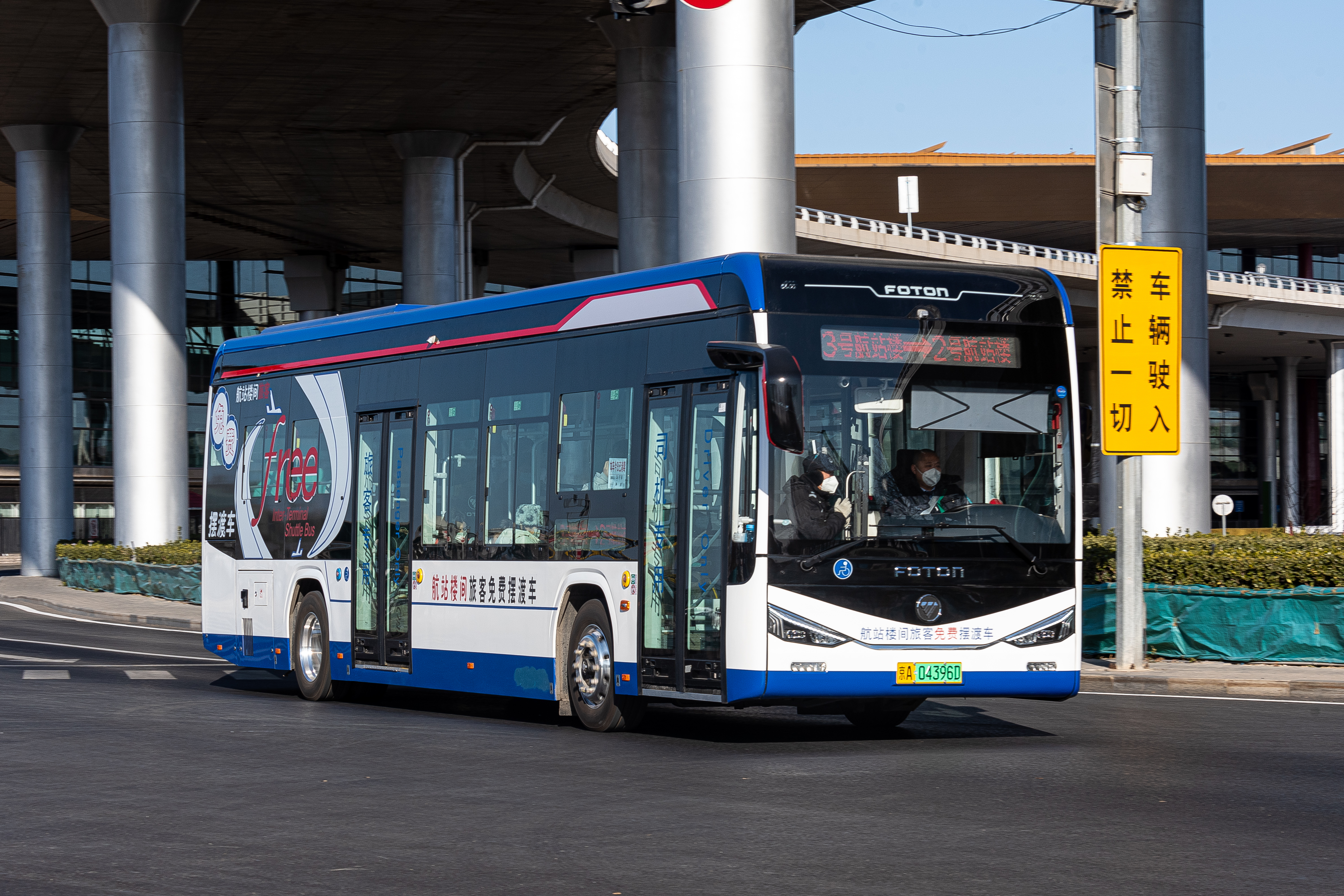
Interterminal Shuttle Bus (landside)

The airport provides a free interterminal shuttle bus between Terminals 1/2 and 3. They operate every 10 minutes from 6 am to 11 pm, and every 30 minutes from 11 pm until 6 am. Terminals 1 and 2 are connected by a lengthy corridor.

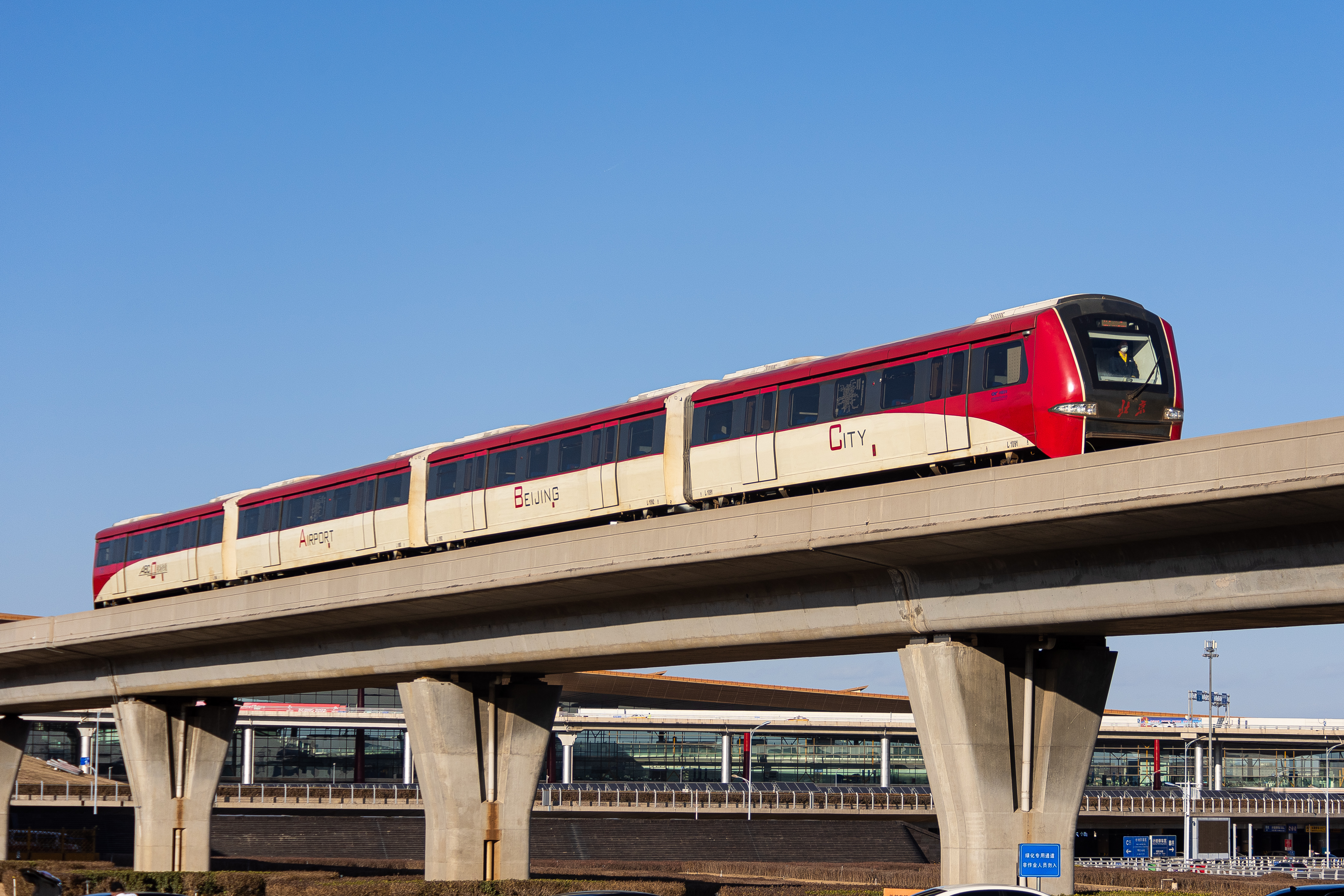
Beijing Subway Capital Airport Express Line.

=== Rail ===
Beijing Capital International Airport is served by the Capital Airport Express, a dedicated rail link operated as part of the Beijing Subway system. The 30.0 km (18.6 mi) line runs from Terminal 3 to Terminal 2 and then to the city with stops at Sanyuanqiao and Dongzhimen before ending at Beixinqiao. The line opened on 19 July 2008, in time for the 2008 Summer Olympics, while a one-stop extension to Beixinqiao station was opened on 31 December 2021. A one-way trip takes approximately 16–20 minutes.

=== Bus ===
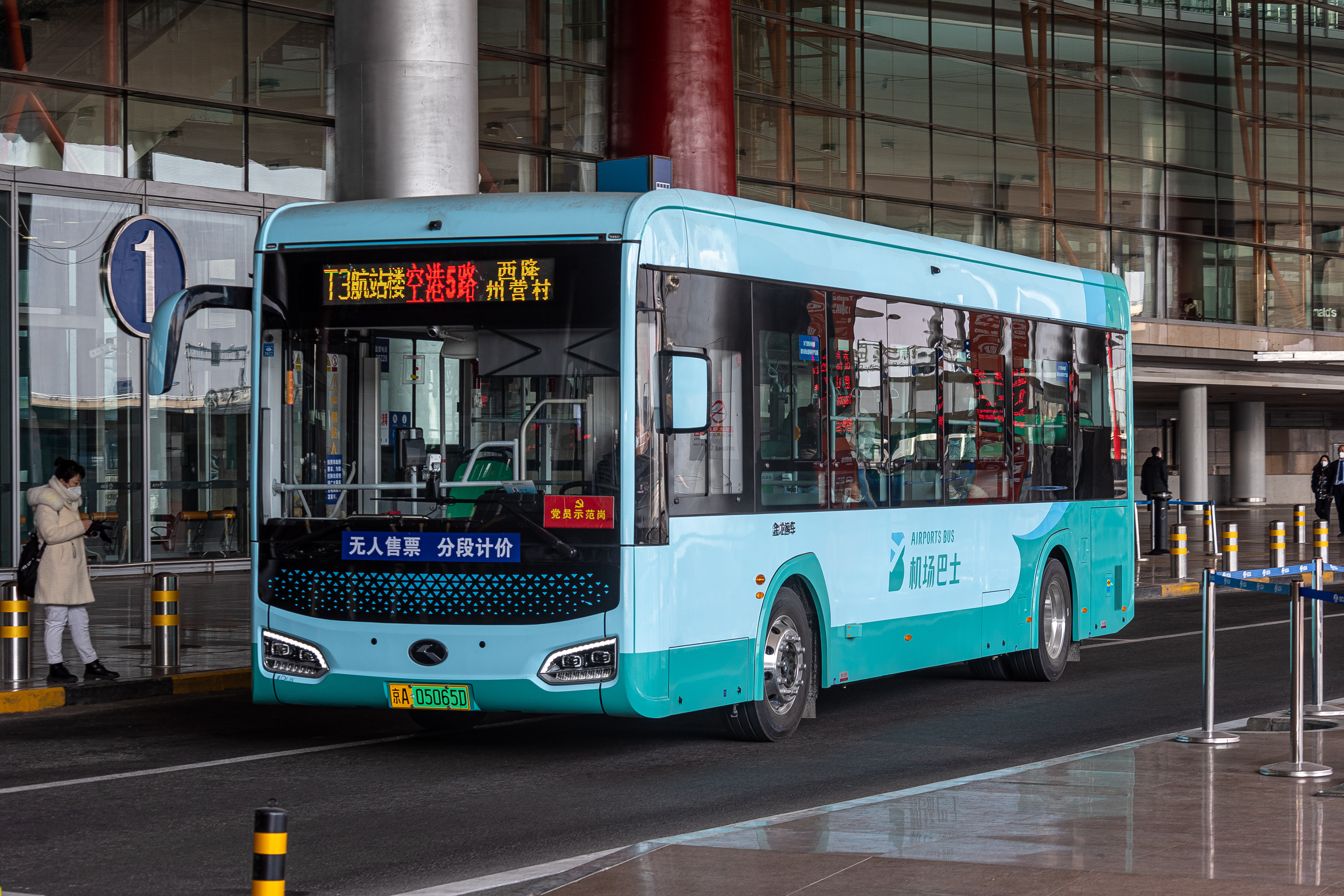
An airport bus at Terminal 3

There are 18 bus routes to and from points throughout the city including Xidan, Beijing railway station, Beijing South railway station, Beijing West railway station, Zhongguancun, Fangzhuang and Shangdi. The airport buses run to each of the three terminals and cost up to ¥30 per ride depending on the route. The airport buses accept only paper tickets that are sold at each terminal and certain bus stops in the city. The airport also offers intercity bus services to and from neighboring cities including Tianjin, Qinhuangdao, Baoding, Langfang and Tangshan.

=== Car ===
The airport is accessible by four expresses tollways, two of which run directly from northeastern Beijing to the airport. The other two connect to the airport from nearby highways.

- The Airport Expressway is a 20 km (12 mi) toll road that runs from the northeastern 3rd Ring Road at Sanyuanqiao directly to Terminals 1 and 2. It was built in the 1990s and has served as the primary road connection to the city.
- The 2nd Airport Expressway, opened in 2008, is a 15.6 km (9.7 mi) toll road that runs east from Yaojiayuan Lu at the eastern 5th Ring Road and then north to Terminal 3.
- The Northern Airport Line, opened in 2006, is an 11.3 km (7.0 mi) toll road that runs east from the Jingcheng Expressway to Terminals 1 and 2.
- The Southern Airport Line, opened in 2008, is a toll road that runs parallel and to the south of the Northern Airport Line from the Jingcheng Expressway to the eastern Sixth Ring Road at the Litian Bridge. This highway crosses the Airport Expressway and 2nd Airport Expressway, and enables drivers on the former to reach Terminal 3 and the latter to head to Terminals 1 and 2.

== Accolades ==
Rankings
Traffic	Rank	Year
List of airports by passenger traffic	2	2014
List of airports by traffic movements	5	2014
List of airports by cargo traffic	12	2014

- 2009 – first on the ranking of the World's Best Airport by Condé Nast Traveler magazine, based on its satisfaction survey.
- 2011 – third Best Airport Worldwide of the Airport Service Quality Awards by Airports Council International.
- 2011–2022 – ACI Director General's Roll of Excellence by Airports Council International
- 2020, 2021 – best airport in the Asia-Pacific serving over 40 million passengers per year by Airports Council International
- 2021 – best hygiene measures in the Asia-Pacific by Airports Council International
- 2021 – Voice of the Customer by Airports Council International

== Statistics ==
Traffic by calendar year
Year	Passenger volume	Change from previous year	Aircraft operations	Cargo (tons)
2007	53,611,747		399,209	1,416,211.3
2008	55,938,136	▲4.3%	429,646	1,367,710.3
2009	65,375,095	▲16.9%	487,918	1,475,656.8
2010	73,948,114	▲13.1%	517,585	1,551,471.6
2011	78,674,513	▲6.4%	533,166	1,640,231.8
2012	81,929,359	▲4.1%	557,167	1,787,027
2013	83,712,355	▲2.2%	567,759	1,843,681
2014	86,128,313	▲2.9%	581,952	1,848,251
2015	89,900,000	▲4.4%	594,785	1,843,543
2016	94,393,000	▲5.6%	606,086	1,831,167
2017	95,786,296	▲1.5%	597,259	2,029,583
2018	100,983,290	▲5.4%	614,022	2,074,005
2019	100,013,642	▼1.0%	594,000	1,955,286
2020	34,513,827	▼65.5%	291,498	1,210,441
2021	32,639,013	▼5.4%	297,176	1,401,313
2022	12,703,342	▼61.1%	157,630	988,675
2023	52,879,156	▲316.3%	379,710	1,115,908
2024	67,367,428	▲27.4%	433,572	1,443,286
2025	70,744,000	▲5.0%	442,040	1,550,920

== Climate ==
Climate data for Beijing Capital International Airport (January 2013~June 2026 normals)
Month	Jan	Feb	Mar	Apr	May	Jun	Jul	Aug	Sep	Oct	Nov	Dec	Year
Mean daily maximum °C (°F)	3.3 (37.9)	6.6 (43.9)	15.2 (59.4)	22.2 (72.0)	27.9 (82.2)	31.7 (89.1)	32.4 (90.3)	31.5 (88.7)	27.5 (81.5)	19.4 (66.9)	11.3 (52.3)	4.7 (40.5)	19.5 (67.1)
Daily mean °C (°F)	−3.2 (26.2)	0.0 (32.0)	8.4 (47.1)	15.2 (59.4)	21.0 (69.8)	25.4 (77.7)	27.2 (81.0)	26.2 (79.2)	21.6 (70.9)	12.7 (54.9)	5.0 (41.0)	−2.0 (28.4)	13.1 (55.6)
Mean daily minimum °C (°F)	−8.8 (16.2)	−6.3 (20.7)	1.3 (34.3)	7.4 (45.3)	13.0 (55.4)	18.4 (65.1)	22.2 (72.0)	21.1 (70.0)	15.6 (60.1)	7.0 (44.6)	−0.2 (31.6)	−7.4 (18.7)	6.9 (44.5)
Average relative humidity (%)	45	43	42	44	50	57	72	73	69	65	56	47	55

== Other facilities ==
Beijing Capital Airlines has its headquarters in the Capital Airlines Building (首都航空大厦; Shǒudū Hángkōng Dàshà) at the airport.

== Accidents and incidents at or near PEK ==
- A Civil Aviation Administration of China (CAAC) Ilyushin Il-14 on approach plunged towards the ground for undetermined reasons (possibly wind shear), broke apart and caught fire, and killed 13 out of the 14 occupants on board.
- Another CAAC Ilyushin Il-14 crashed 1.2 km (0.75 mi) from PEK during a nighttime approach in poor visibility because of an incorrect altimeter setting and the absence of the flight instructor in the cockpit during the approach. Both occupants died.
- On 27 August 2019, an Air China Airbus A330 caught fire while parked at the gate during boarding. All 161 passengers and crew evacuated safely, but the aircraft was substantially damaged and written off.

== Sister airports ==
- O'Hare International Airport
- Helsinki Airport
- Hong Kong International Airport
- Los Angeles International Airport
- Manchester Airport
- Munich Airport
- Suvarnabhumi Airport
- Sydney Airport
- Stockholm Arlanda Airport
- Zayed International Airport

== See also ==
- Beijing Daxing International Airport
- List of airports in China
- List of the busiest airports in China
- List of airports with triple takeoff/landing capability
