= Aero Flight =

Charter airline of Germany (2004–2005)

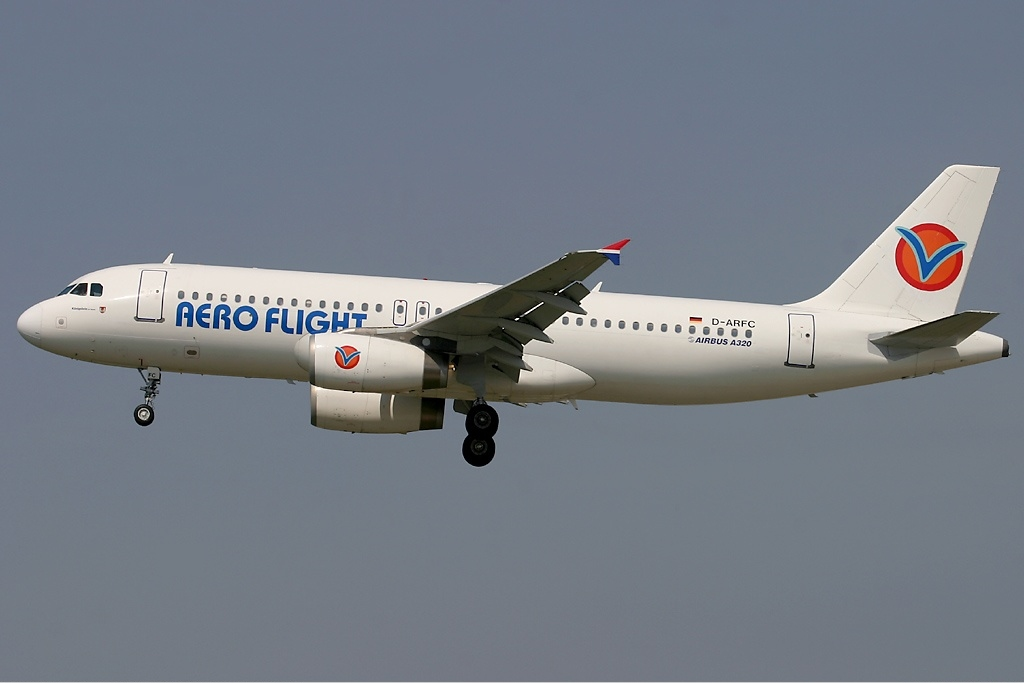
- Airbus A320
IATA	ICAO	Call sign
GV	ARF	AERO FOX
- Founded: March 2004
- Commenced operations: 26 March 2004
- Ceased operations: 30 October 2005
- Fleet size: 6
- Destinations: 18
- Headquarters: Oberursel, Germany
- Website: flyaeroflight.de

Aero Flight GmbH & Co. Luftverkehrs-KG was a short-lived airline based in Oberursel, Hesse, Germany. It operated international charter passenger service.

== History ==
The airline was established in March 2004 and started operations on 26 of this month. Aero Flight was formed using part of the assets of the charter airline Aero Lloyd, which had ceased operations in October 2003.

Aero Flight ceased operations October 30, 2005. The airline's assets were subsequently bought by the Iceland-based Avion group in a deal that took effect in early 2006.

== Destinations ==
Aero Flight operated services to the following international scheduled destinations as of January 2005: Adana, Alicante, Ankara, Cairo, Catania, Düsseldorf, Frankfurt, Fuerteventura, Hurghada, Istanbul, Luxor, Munich, Pristina, Santa Cruz de la Palma, Sarajevo, Saint Petersburg, Stuttgart, and Tivat.

== Fleet ==
The Aero Flight fleet consisted of the following aircraft before it ceased operations late 2005:

Aero Lloyd fleet
Aircraft	Total	Introduced	Retired	Notes
Airbus A320-200	4	2004	2005	
Airbus A321-200	2	2004	2005	Transferred to Airblue; One later crashed as Airblue Flight 202

== See also ==
- List of defunct airlines of Germany
