= Bommersheim =

- Stadtteil of Oberursel (Taunus)
- Coat of arms
- Interactive map of Bommersheim
- Location within Germany Location within Hesse
- Country: Germany
- State: Hesse
- Admin. region: Darmstadt
- District: Hochtaunuskreis
- Town: Oberursel (Taunus)
- Time zone: UTC+01:00 (CET)
  - Summer (DST): UTC+02:00 (CEST)
- Postal codes: 61440
- Dialling codes: 06171
- Vehicle registration: HG
- Website: City of Oberursel (municipality)

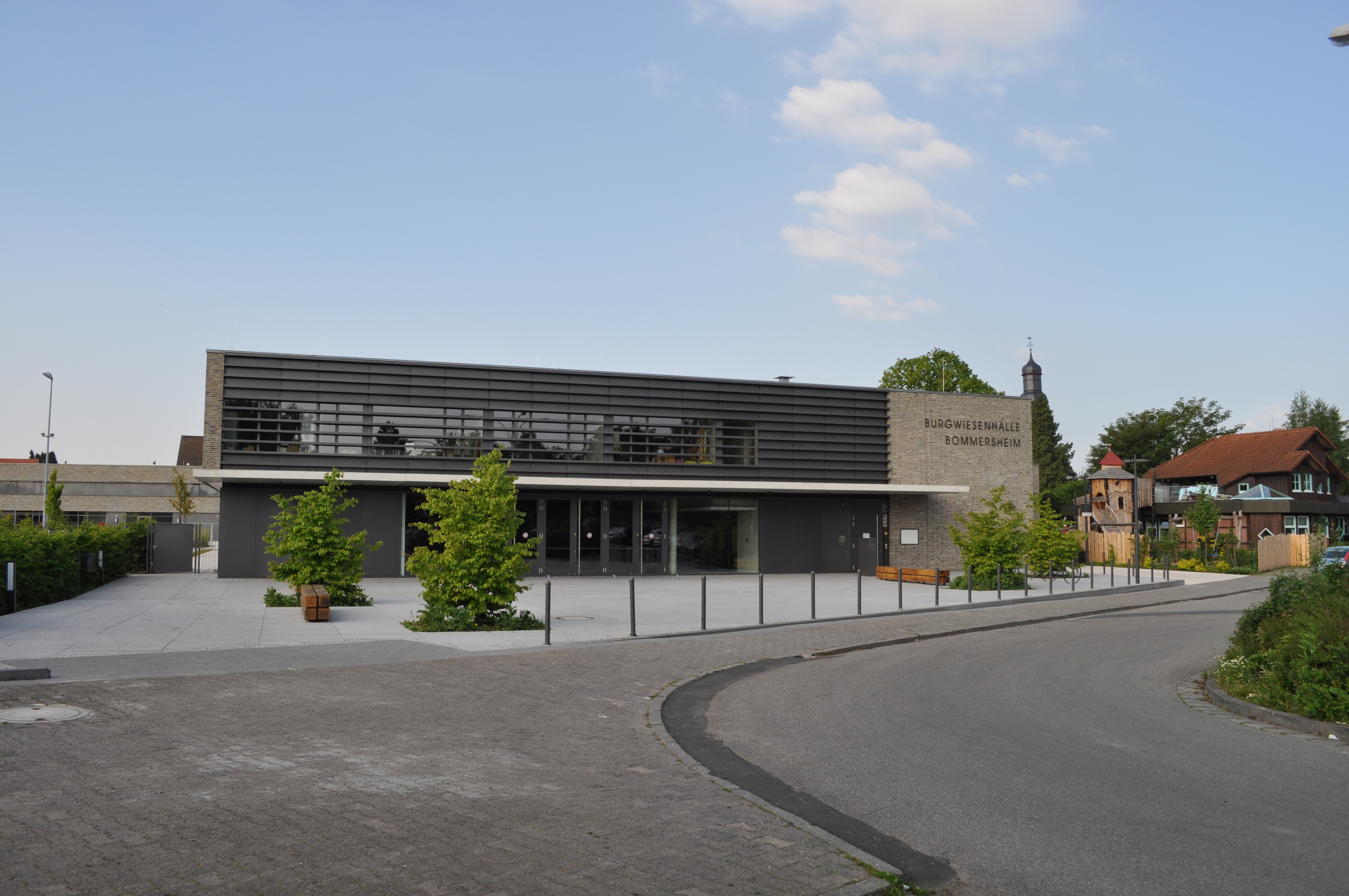
Burgwiesenhalle, kindergarten (right) and church (background)

Bommersheim is one of five town districts of Oberursel, located southeast of the core city and immediately northwest of Frankfurt am Main in Germany. It is part of the Frankfurt Rhein-Main urban area

== History ==
The oldest known documented mention of Bommersheim is found in the Codex Laureshamensis, the so-called Lorscher Codex.

- October 792: The first time under the name Botmarsheim mentioned.
- Spring 1382: The castle Bommersheim is destroyed.
- 1929: Incorporation into Oberursel.
