= Aero Lloyd =

Charter airline of Germany (1979–2003)

- An Aero Lloyd Airbus A320
IATA	ICAO	Call sign
YP	AEF	AERO LLOYD
- Founded: 6 September 1979
- Ceased operations: 16 October 2003
- Operating bases: Frankfurt Airport
- Frequent-flyer program: Flyplus
- Fleet size: 56
- Destinations: 59
- Parent company: BayernLB (66%)
- Headquarters: Oberursel, Hesse, Germany
- Website: www.aerolloyd.de

Aero Lloyd Flugreisen GmbH & Co, operating as Aero Lloyd, was a German charter airline based in Oberursel, Germany. It was headquartered in Building 182 at Frankfurt Airport in Frankfurt before it was moved to Oberursel.

== History ==
=== Early years ===
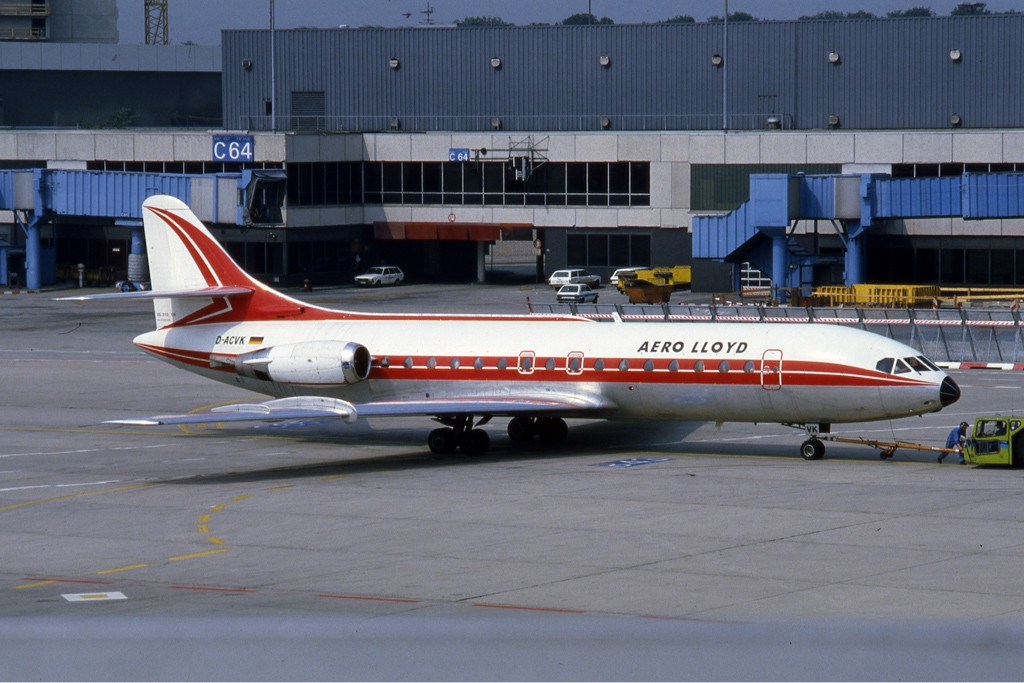
An Aero Lloyd Sud Aviation Caravelle at Frankfurt Airport, Germany

Aero Lloyd was founded on September 6, 1979 and launched operations in March 1981 with three Sud Aviation Caravelles. By 1982, the airline received 3 ex-Garuda Indonesia Douglas DC-9-32 aircraft.

In 1986, the airline began to receive McDonnell Douglas MD-80 aircraft used to add new destinations. In 1988, Aero Lloyd launched scheduled services to London in the United Kingdom, Paris in France, and Zürich in Switzerland with the newly acquired aircraft. However, by 1992, Aero Lloyd dropped scheduled operations after realising it was not a good move for the airline.

In 1998, the Bayerische Landesbank took over a majority stake of 66% with the intention of selling it on to a strategic buyer. The Bayerische Landesbank was also the largest lender. In 2000, the return on sales was below 1% and thus below the industry average. In 2001 the Bayerische Landesbank had to grant a loan of 20 million euros to ensure liquidity. Aero Lloyd achieved a market share of around 12% in 2002, but suffered from overcapacities on the market.

=== Collapse ===
The airline ceased operations on October 16, 2003 after shareholders refused to continue funding the airline. The collapse left 4,000 passengers stuck at German airports and 4,500 stuck overseas. Its assets were acquired by Aero Lloyd founder, Bogomir Gradisnik. Under the management of Gradisnik's associate, Miso Aksmanovic, the company was reshaped into a smaller charter operation named Aero Flight which was established in March 2004 and started operations on March 26, 2004. Aero Flight ceased operations in October 30, 2005.

== Fleet ==
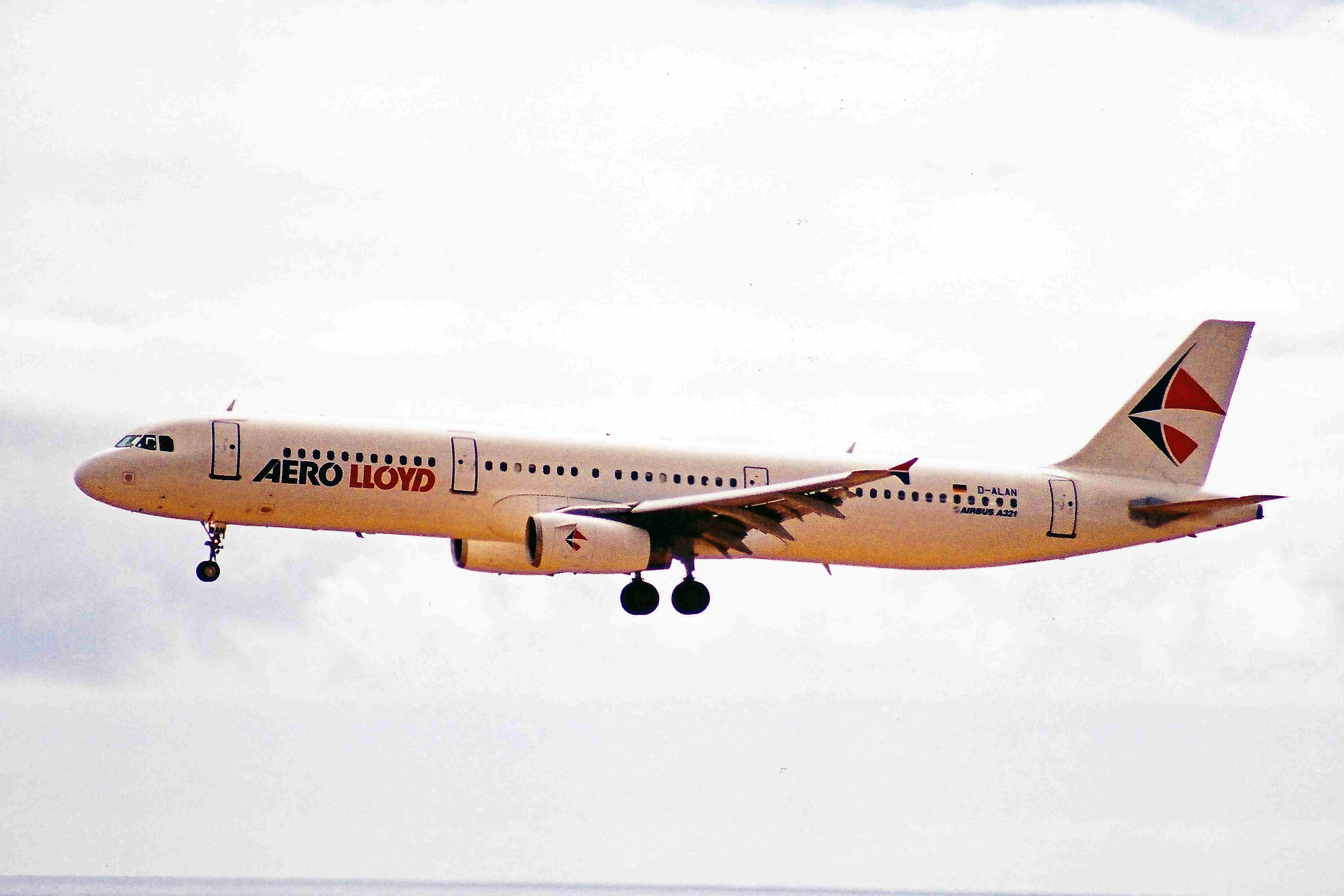
An Aero Lloyd Airbus A321-200. This particular aircraft would later crash as Airblue Flight 202.

The Aero Lloyd fleet consisted of the following aircraft throughout operations:

Aero Lloyd fleet
Aircraft	Total	Introduced	Retired	Notes
Airbus A320-200	1	1991	1991	Leased from Adria Airways
Airbus A320-200	2	1994	1994	Leased from Leisure Air and Translift Airways
Airbus A320-200	11	1996	2003	
Airbus A321-200	11	1998	2003	
McDonnell Douglas DC-9-32	4	1982	1994	
McDonnell Douglas MD-82	2	1994	1997	
McDonnell Douglas MD-83	16	1987	2001	
McDonnell Douglas MD-87	4	1988	1997	
Sud Aviation SE-210 Caravelle	3	1979	1991	

== Accidents and incidents ==
- On September 1, 2001, an Aero Lloyd Airbus A321-200, operating a charter flight from Catania-Fontanarossa Airport, Italy to Berlin Tegel Airport, Germany, had an attempted hijacking shortly after takeoff. The plane was diverted to Naples Airport in Italy where it made an emergency landing and the hijacker was arrested. There is a mix of reports ranging from the man using wax candles as dynamite and that of a panic attack. Nobody was injured in the incident.
- On July 1, 2002, Aero Lloyd Flight 1135, an Airbus A320-200, was running behind schedule and did not reach Friedrichshafen Airport until after the allotted arrival time for passenger flights. The region's Zürich-based traffic control centre was not expecting to handle any more landings that night and therefore only had a single controller working the late-night shift, despite regulations that required at least two controllers on duty at all times. The controller's efforts to assist Flight 1135 had repeatedly distracted him from his prior responsibility to handle high-altitude traffic in the Lake Constance region; this was cited by investigators as a major contributing factor in a nearby mid-air collision above Überlingen. Flight 1135 itself was not involved in the collision and landed without incident minutes later.

== See also ==
- List of defunct airlines of Germany
