= Oberursel (Taunus) =

- Town
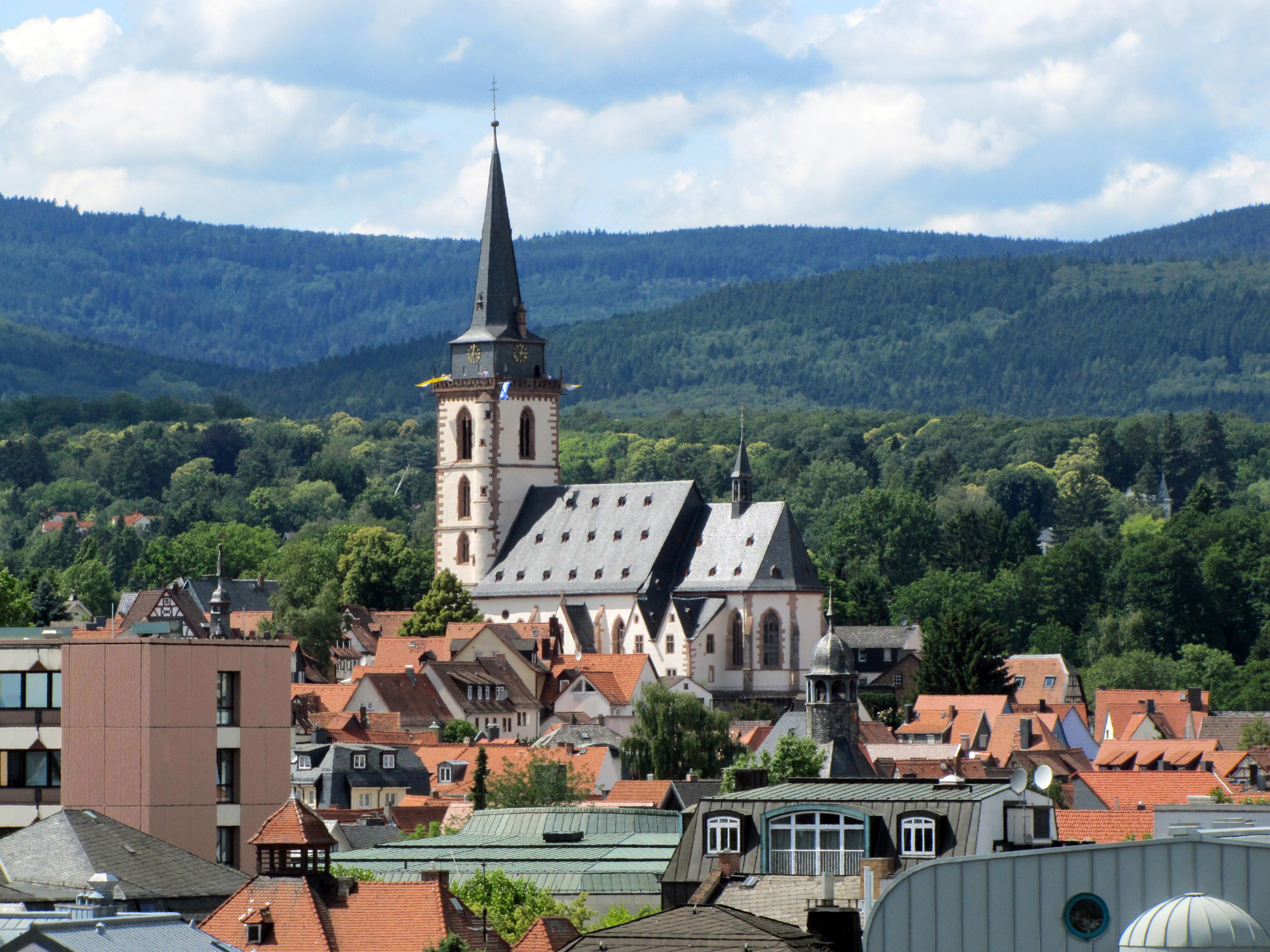
- Saint Ursula Church at the Old Town of Oberursel

- Coat of arms

- Location of Oberursel (Taunus) within Hochtaunuskreis district
- Interactive map of Oberursel (Taunus)
- Location within Germany Location within Hesse
- Coordinates: 50°12′12″N 08°34′37″E
- Country: Germany
- State: Hesse
- Admin. region: Darmstadt
- District: Hochtaunuskreis

Government
  - Mayor (2021–27): Antje Runge (SPD)

Area
  - Total: 45.34 km^{2} (17.51 sq mi)
- Elevation: 197 m (646 ft)

Population (2025-12-31)
  - Total: 46,757
  - Density: 1,031/km^{2} (2,671/sq mi)
- Time zone: UTC+01:00 (CET)
  - Summer (DST): UTC+02:00 (CEST)
- Postal codes: 61440
- Dialling codes: 06171, 06172 (Oberstedten)
- Vehicle registration: HG, USI
- Website: oberursel.de

Oberursel (Taunus) (German pronunciation: [oːbɐˈʔʊʁzl̩], lit. 'Upper Ursel', in contrast to "Lower Ursel") is a town in Germany and part of the Frankfurt Rhein-Main urban area. It is located to the north west of Frankfurt, in the Hochtaunuskreis county. It is the 13th largest town in Hesse. In 2011, the town hosted the 51st Hessentag state festival.

== Geography ==
=== Extent of municipal area ===
The maximum distance from the northern town border to the southern border is 7.2 km (4 mi) the maximum distance from east to west is 13.0 km (8 mi).

Altitude

- Krebsmühle (Weißkirchen): 138 m above sea level
- Town Hall: 198 m above sea level
- Hohemark: 300 m above sea level
- The nearly Grosse Feldberg is the highest spot in the Taunus: 820 m above sea level

=== Neighbouring communities ===
To the north Oberursel borders with Schmitten, to the east with Bad Homburg vor der Höhe, to the south-east with Frankfurt, to the southwest with Steinbach and to the west with Kronberg.

=== Town districts ===
Besides the town centre (including Bommersheim), Oberursel is divided into the districts Oberstedten (population 6,118), Stierstadt (5,541) and Weißkirchen (Oberursel) (5,151). Bommersheim was annexed before the municipal reform of 1972 and therefore is not an independent district.

== History ==
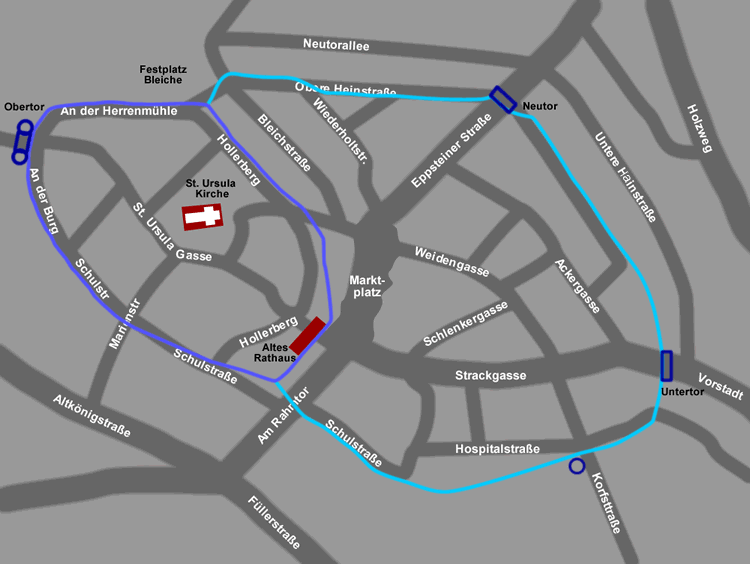
Oberursel town wall

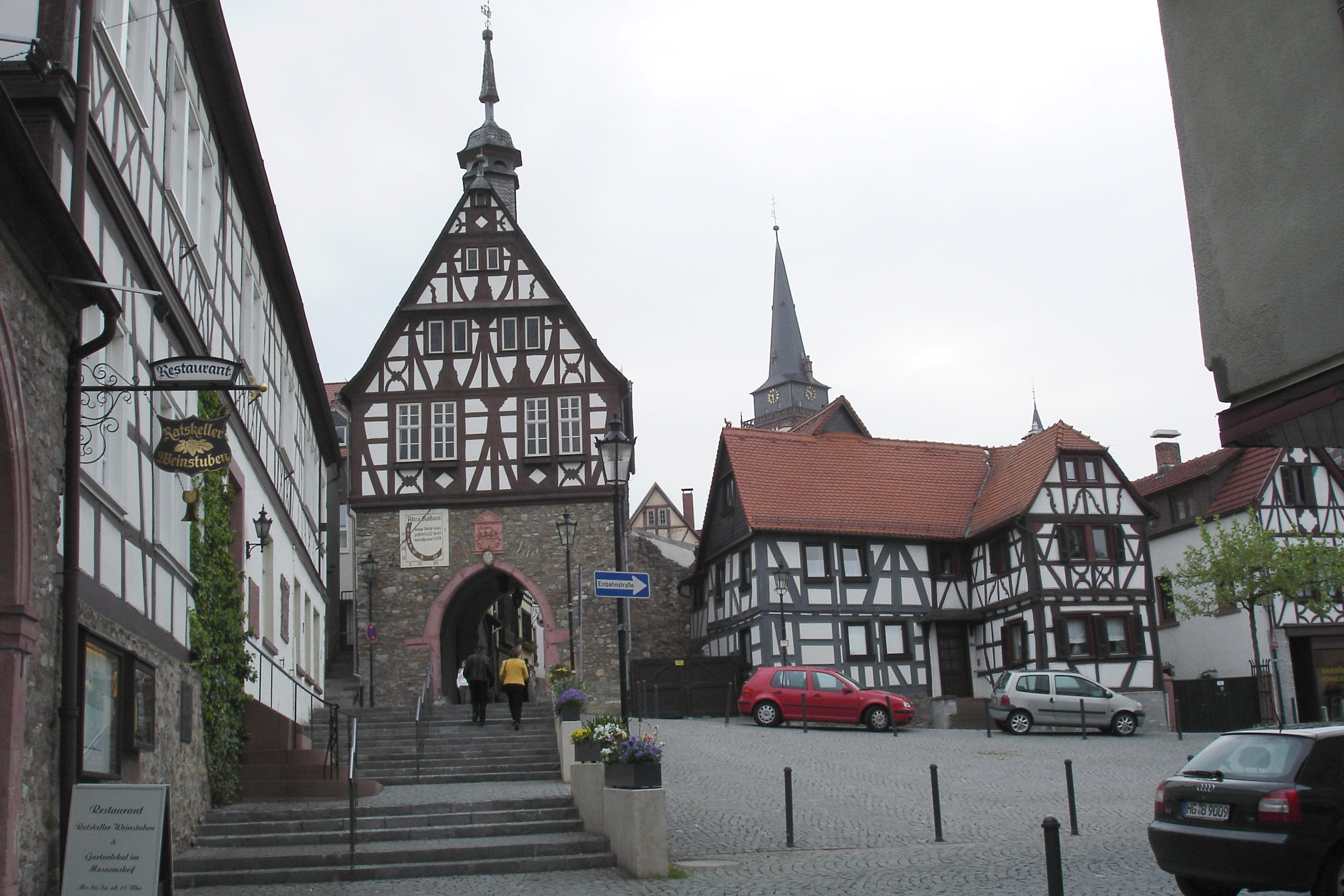
Old town hall at market place

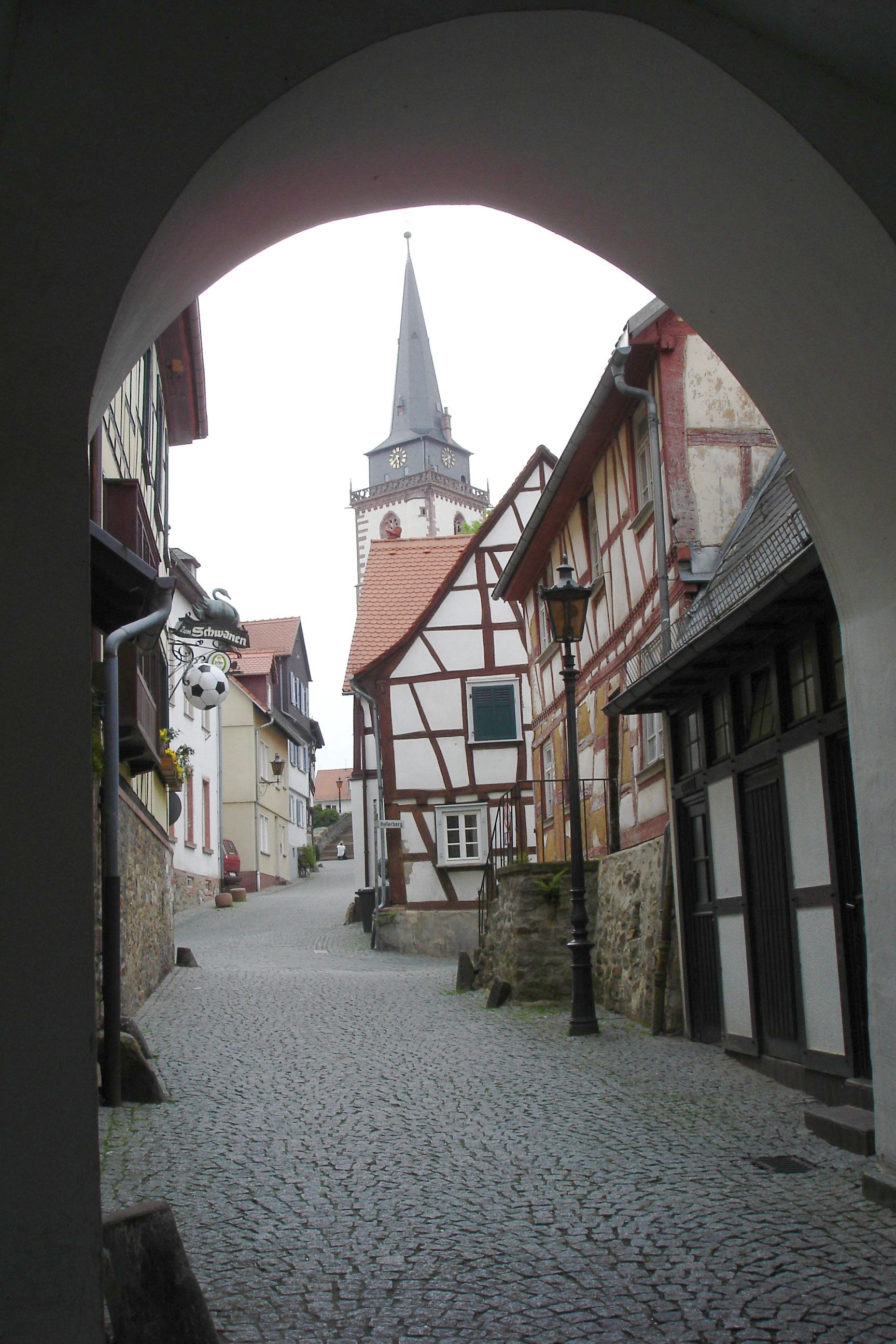
Footpath from market place to St Ursula

The town was first mentioned as "Ursella" in 791 in a deed recording a donation to the monastery Lorsch. In the year 880 the first church in the area, called "monasterium ad ursellam", was mentioned. In 1317 the first trading activities were documented. In 1444 Oberursel was officially sanctioned as a town. Two years later, the town wall was finished. Since the town was growing so fast in the 15th century the town walls had to be expanded in 1481 towards the east. In the early 16th century a school for Latin language was established next to the church.

1535 Oberursel become property of Earl Ludwig von Stolberg-Königstein and becomes a Protestant town. 1557 Nicolaus Henricus built the first printing plant in Oberursel. 1605 due to the Counter-Reformation Oberursel becomes Catholic again. The most important industry in the late Middle Ages and in the early modern times was the clothier business.

During the Thirty Years' War the town was destroyed three times, in 1622 and 1645, and the number of inhabitants decreased from 1,600 to 600. During the 1645 razing, most buildings were destroyed by fire; the three surviving buildings were the old town hall, the bakery, and one apartment house near the marketplace. This is the reason why nearly all houses in the old town of Oberursel are from the 17th century.

As the town was rebuilt and grew, many mills and forges were founded along the "Urselbachtal". By 1858, industrialisation had begun in Oberursel, with several cotton-spinning mills being built. In 1860 Oberursel was linked to the railway between Bad Homburg and Frankfurt. In 1899 a subway was opened privately in the direction of Hohemark (currently Line U3).

During the Second World War, many captured American and British airmen passed through Oberursel as they were interrogated and processed into the German POW camp system at the "Durchgangslager der Luftwaffe" or "Transit Camp of the Luftwaffe" located in the town. The camp name was commonly shortened to "Dulag Luft", or simply "Dulag". Almost all allied airmen who were shot down and captured spent some time at that camp before being moved to their permanent assigned "Stalag".

After the occupation of Oberursel by the U.S. in April 1945, the "Dulag" area was taken over by the US Army. The existing buildings were transformed into Camp King, which began as an intelligence post, then later a transportation post until its de-activation in 1993. Today the former Camp King is a residential area, still populated by several former US soldiers.

=== Growth ===
In 1929 Bommersheim was annexed; in 1972 Oberstedten, Stierstadt and Weißkirchen followed.

=== Number of Inhabitants ===
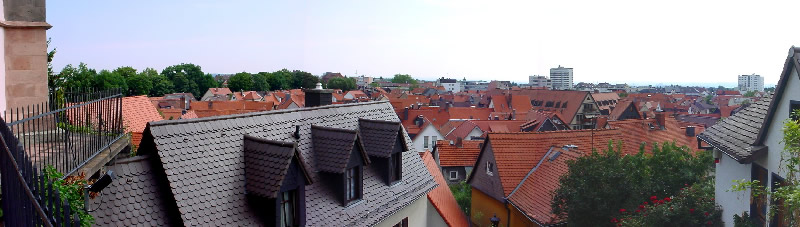
Old town view from St. Ursula church

1542: 1,100
1618: 1,600
1648: 600
1799: 7,999
1972 (before annexations): 25,000
1972 (after annexations): 37,000
2001: 42,736
2005: 42,839
2006: 43,165

== Politics ==
Since the 2021 municipal elections, the city council has the following distribution of seats:

CDU	: 12 seats
Greens	: 11 seats
SPD	: 7 seats
OBG - FW	: 6 seats
FDP	: 4 seats
AfD	: 2 seats
Linke	: 2 seats
Klimaliste	: 1 seat

=== Mayors ===
- 1897– 1926: Josef Füller (DVP)
- 1926– 1933: Karl Horn
- 1933: Karl Lange (NSDAP) (01. Jan.– 27. Mar.)
- 1933– 1945: August Weß (NSDAP)
- 1945: Heinrich Kappus (NSDAP) (03. April– 26. May)
- 1945: Ernst Wahl (Instated by the US-Military government) (29. May– 08. Oct.)
- 1945: Karl Pohlmann (Instated by the US-Military government) (08. Oct.– 11. Oct.)
- 1945– 1946: Werner Jaspert (Instated by the US-Military government) (11. Oct. 1945– 31. Mar. 1946)
- 1946– 1960: Heinrich Kappus (CDU)
- 1960– 1972: Heinrich Beil (CDU)
- 1972–1978: Karlheinz Pfaff (SPD)
- 1978–1990: Rudolf Harders (CDU)
- 1990–1996: Thomas Schadow (CDU)
- 1996–2003: Gerd Krämer (CDU)
- 2003–2021: Hans-Georg Brum (SPD)
- from October 2021: Antje Runge (SPD)

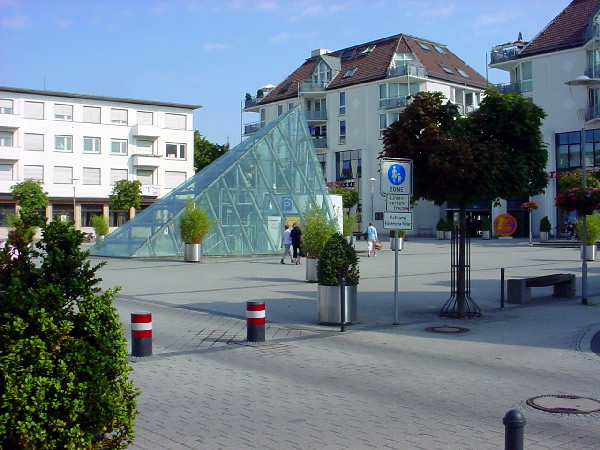
View from Epinayplatz

== Twin towns – sister cities ==
Oberursel (Taunus) is twinned with:

- Épinay-sur-Seine, France (1964)
- Koggenland, Netherlands (1971)
- Rushmoor, England, United Kingdom (1989)
- Lomonosov, Russia (2004)

== Culture ==
The "Vortaunusmuseum" is located in the central marketplace. Its exhibits illustrate the town's history and the history of soap box derbies. Soap box derbies were invented in Oberursel, and the world championship is held in Oberursel every year.

Another popular event occurring in Oberursel is the Brunnenfest, an annual village fair held in the early summer, which attracts visitors from surrounding areas and around the world.

== Transport ==
Oberursel is located on the A661 motorway near the "Bad Homburger Kreuz", which is the interchange between the A661 and the A5 (Hannover -Frankfurt - Basel). The Frankfurt Airport is about 20 minutes away.

There are 6 regional bus lines in the town. During the weekend there is a night bus to Frankfurt. There is a rail service via a suburban transit railway (S5) and a combined tram-subway (U3). Both lines go to Frankfurt and go underground in the centre part of Frankfurt.

== Economy ==
There are many well known companies located in Oberursel, predominantly in the IT and tourism industries.

- Thomas Cook AG
- Utimaco Safeware AG
- Dimension Data Germany AG & Co (Until 2014)
- Alte Leipziger (insurance)
- Rolls-Royce Deutschland GmbH
- AVIS
- AFN ( Transmitter Weisskirchen)
- IBM Data Center, Bommersheim
- Dantotsu Intelligent Solutions GbR

Condor Airlines operates an office in Oberursel.

Prior to its dissolution, Aero Lloyd was headquartered in Oberursel. When Aero Flight existed, it had its head office in Oberursel.

== Education ==
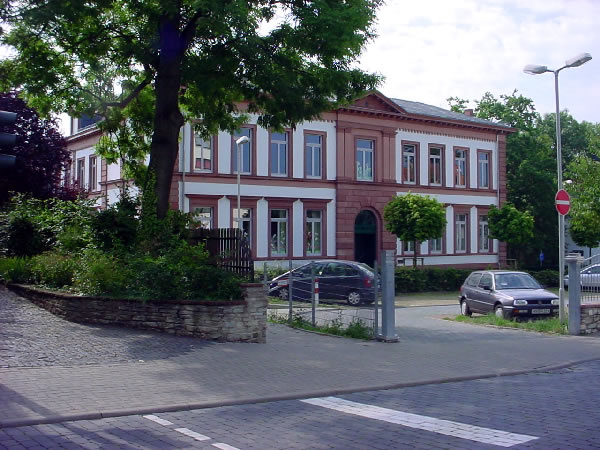
Basic primary school Mitte

Oberursel is the educational centre of "Hochtaunuskreis" county. As well as six primary schools, one in each of the town districts, there is a grammar school, a secondary school, a secondary modern school (junior high) and a comprehensive school.

There are also two private schools, "Helen-Keller-Schule" and "Hans-Thoma-Schule", a commercial high school named "Feldbergschule", and the Frankfurt International School.

The following vocational institutions, training centres, and speciality schools are also located in Oberursel:

- Freie Waldorfschule Vordertaunus
- Albrecht-Strohschein-Schule (Heilpädagogische Waldorfschule)
- Ketteler-la-Roche-Schule (Fachschule für Sozialpädagogik)
- Lutherische Theologische Hochschule (Selbständige Evangelisch-Lutherische Kirche)
- BASA Jugendwerkstatt Hochtaunus
- Reformhaus-Fachakademie
- Bildungszentrum (seither: Verwaltungsschule) der Bundesanstalt für Arbeit
- Volkshochschule Oberursel
- Musikschule Oberursel (Taunus)
- Bundesjugendbildungszentrum des DGB
- Institut für Bienenkunde
