= Oberstedten =

- Borough of Oberursel (Taunus)
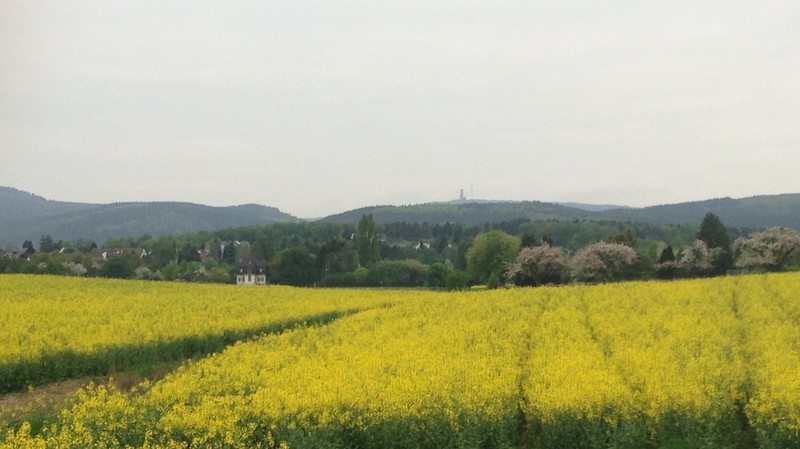
- View of Oberstedten (in May)

- Coat of arms
- Interactive map of Oberstedten
- Location within Germany Location within Hesse
- Country: Germany
- State: Hesse
- Admin. region: Darmstadt
- District: Hochtaunuskreis
- Town: Oberursel (Taunus)
- Time zone: UTC+01:00 (CET)
  - Summer (DST): UTC+02:00 (CEST)
- Postal codes: 61440
- Dialling codes: 06172
- Vehicle registration: HG
- Website: City of Oberursel (municipality)

Oberstedten is one of four town subdivisions (Stadtteile) and one of three boroughs (Ortsbezirke) of Oberursel, located north of the core city and immediately northwest of Frankfurt am Main in Germany. It is part of the Frankfurt Rhein-Main urban area at the border of Bad Homburg.

== History ==
Oberstedten was first mentioned 817 AD under the Name "Stetine". Later it was divided in Ober-, Mittel- and Niederstedten. In the very neighbourhood the knight's castle Hohenberg has been built, which was sold in 1200 AD to Gottfried von Eppstein. Today it is known as the Bad Homburg Castle with the famous "Bergfried" (white tower)

Around this castle the town Bad Homburg was founded by assimilating Mittel- and Niederstedten.

1972 Oberstedten was incorporated in Oberursel, but still has the area code of Bad Homburg (06172).
