= Martha E. Sloan =

American electrical engineer (born 1939)

- Born: Martha Ann Evans; 1939 (age 86–87); Aurora, Illinois
- Education: Stanford University; Massachusetts Institute of Technology
- Known for: President of the Institute of Electrical and Electronics Engineers, 1993
- Awards: Frederick Emmons Terman Award (1979); IEEE Centennial Medal (1984); IEEE Richard E. Merwin Distinguished Service Award (1990); IEEE Fellow (1991); ACM Fellow (1994)
- Scientific career
- Workplaces: Lockheed Missiles and Space Company; Frankfurt International School; Michigan Technological University

Martha Ann Evans Sloan (born 1939) is an American electrical engineer. She taught engineering for many years at Michigan Technological University, and became the first female president of the IEEE. Her service to the profession has been honored by several society fellowships and awards.

== Education and teaching career ==
Martha Ann Evans was born in Aurora, Illinois in 1939, the daughter of an obstetrician. She first learned about circuit design between her junior and senior years at high school, at a summer institute run by Northwestern University. Attracted to the San Francisco Bay Area because a friend had moved there, she went to Stanford University intending to major in physics, but instead ended up studying electrical engineering. At this time she was involved with radio, through Stanford's student station KZSU, and as a junior in 1959–1960 she was the secretary of the Stanford student chapter of the Institute of Radio Engineers, one of the predecessor organizations of the IEEE. She graduated in 1961, Phi Beta Kappa and with great distinction, as the only woman among approximately 600 engineering graduates. Later she earned a master's degree in electrical engineering from Stanford.

In the 1960s she worked at the Palo Alto Research Laboratory of the Lockheed Missiles and Space Company. She began a Ph.D. program at the Massachusetts Institute of Technology but, feeling isolated there and pregnant with her first child, she did not complete the program. Instead, she followed her husband to Germany, where she taught for two years at the Frankfurt International School. In 1969, she took a teaching position in electrical engineering at Michigan Technological University, becoming the first female faculty member in the department. Needing a doctorate for her new job, she returned to Stanford and completed a Ph.D. in education in 1973, with a thesis concerning the COSINE Committee, an NSF-funded project to include computer engineering as part of the electrical engineering curriculum. She retired from Michigan Tech in 2013, becoming a professor emerita, after 43 years of service there.

== Professional societies ==
In the late 1970s, Merlin Smith, the president of the IEEE Computer Society, appointed Sloan to the Board of Governors of the Computer Society, the first woman on the board, and soon afterwards appointed her as treasurer of the society, not long before those positions changed from being appointed to being elected. After continuing in several other elected roles in the society, but (in her view) being passed over as a presidential candidate, she ran as a write-in candidate for president of the society, and won the election for the 1984–1985 term. In 1993, again running as a write-in candidate, she was elected as the first female president of the whole IEEE. She was also the only person to become president of the IEEE after leading the Computer Society. In 1998 she chaired the American Association of Engineering Societies.

== Awards and honors ==
Sloan became a fellow of the IEEE in 1991 "for contributions to engineering education, leadership in the development of computer engineering education as a discipline, and leadership in extending engineering education to women." Sloan's other honors include the Frederick Emmons Terman Award of the American Society for Engineering Education in 1979, the IEEE Centennial Medal in 1984, the IEEE Richard E. Merwin Distinguished Service Award in 1990, an honorary doctorate from Concordia University in 1993, election as a fellow of the Association for Computing Machinery in 1994, the Distinguished Engineering Educator Award of the Society of Women Engineers in 1994, the Michigan Tech Distinguished Service Award in 2012, and being named an honorary alumna of Michigan Tech in 2014.
