= Airbahn =

Future airline of the United States

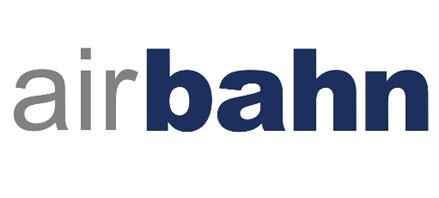
IATA	ICAO	Call sign
—	ARB	AIRBAHN
- Founded: February 20, 2018; 8 years ago
- Ceased operations: June 20, 2022
- Hubs: Ontario International Airport
- Fleet size: 1
- Destinations: 0
- Parent company: Airblue
- Headquarters: Irvine, California, United States
- Key people: Tariq M. Chaudhary (founder & CEO)
- Website: https://www.airbahn.com

Airbahn (stylized as airbahn) was a planned American airline headquartered in Irvine, California.

== History ==
The airline was founded by Tariq M. Chaudhary (who is also the CEO and chairman of Pakistani airline Airblue). The carrier planned to operate out of Southern California, to destinations in California, Nevada, and Western Canada. Airbahn was to receive two A320s from Airblue. The planned service was to start somewhere in the second quarter of 2022, according to Airbahn.

The airline begun recruitment drives and promotions across social media platforms, and received one A320 from Airblue, but constantly faced delays in meeting the requirements to maintain its transportation certificate. The Department of Transportation allowed an extension in January 2022, but with over two years having passed since the original issuance of the certification, the DOT denied another extension in May 2022 and revoked the airline's transportation certificate. The airline's management seemed uninterested in reapplying, and quietly shut down operations, with the sole A320 in the fleet being returned to Airblue in Pakistan.

== Historical Fleet ==
Airbahn fleet
Aircraft	In service	Orders	Seats	Notes
Airbus A320-200	1	1	180	Planned to dry lease A320s from Pakistani carrier Airblue

== Destinations ==
Airbahn planned to operate from Ontario International Airport to three of the following cities along the West Coast of the United States;

State	City	Airport	Start date	Notes
California	Oakland	Oakland International Airport		Planned
California	Ontario	Ontario International Airport		Hub
California	Sacramento	Sacramento International Airport		Planned
California	San Jose	Norman Y. Mineta San Jose International Airport		Planned
