= Airblue Flight 202 =

2010 aviation accident in Pakistan

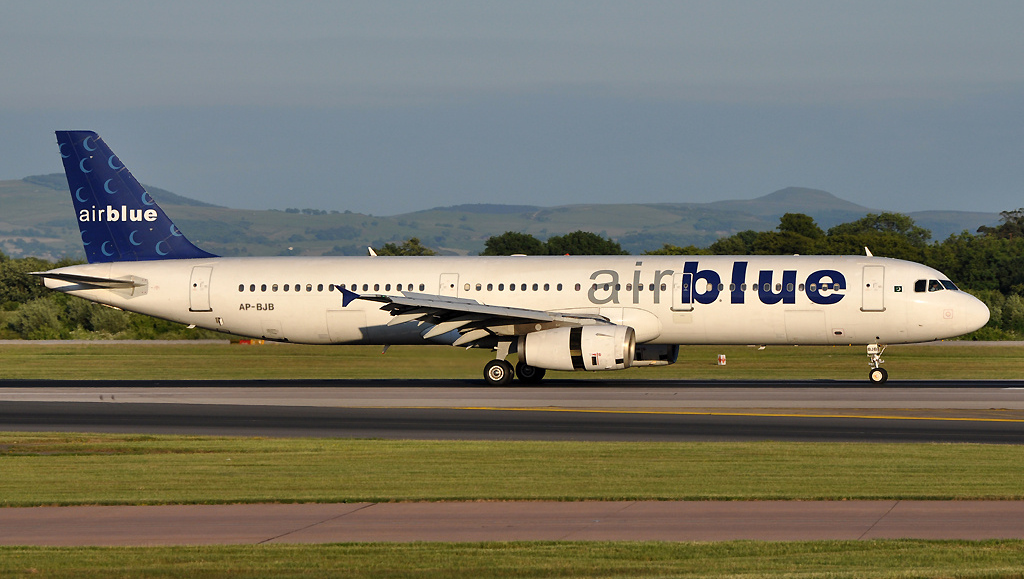
- AP-BJB, the aircraft involved in the accident, seen in June 2010

Accident
- Date: 28 July 2010
- Summary: CFIT; pilot error, navigational error, loss of situational awareness, lack of crew resource management
- Site: Margalla Hills, Islamabad, Pakistan; 33°44′40″N 73°2′36″E

Aircraft
- Aircraft type: Airbus A321-231
- Operator: Airblue
- IATA flight No.: ED202
- ICAO flight No.: ABQ202
- Call sign: AIRBLUE 202
- Registration: AP-BJB
- Flight origin: Jinnah International Airport, Karachi, Pakistan
- Destination: Benazir Bhutto International Airport, Islamabad, Pakistan
- Occupants: 152
- Passengers: 146
- Crew: 6
- Fatalities: 152
- Survivors: 0

Airblue Flight 202 was a scheduled domestic passenger flight from Karachi to Islamabad. On 28 July 2010, the Airbus A321 jet airliner serving the flight crashed into the Margalla Hills north of Islamabad, while approaching Benazir Bhutto International Airport. All 146 passengers and 6 crew members on board were killed. The crash is the deadliest air accident to occur in Pakistan to date and the first fatal crash involving an Airbus A321.

Pakistan's Civil Aviation Authority concluded that the crash of the two-hour flight was caused by the captain's incorrect flight-control input. Captain Pervez-Iqbal Chaudhry had spent the first hour of the flight belittling first officer Muntajib-ud-Din Ahmed who was subsequently reluctant to challenge the captain's multiple piloting mistakes and effectively ceased any meaningful crew resource management. Chaudhry also ignored multiple automated systems warning of the impending crash.

== Accident ==
Location of the crash site within Pakistan

The flight left Karachi at 07:41 local time (02:41 UTC). Flight controllers at Benazir Bhutto International Airport lost contact with the aircraft at 09:41 local time (04:41 UTC). Weather conditions at the time were marginal, and the crew of a China Southern airliner had diverted to an alternate airport and a Pakistan International Airlines (PIA) flight had taken three go-arounds 30 minutes earlier.

The aircraft approached Islamabad from the southeast, following a procedure that required it to fly toward the airport until making visual contact. It was then to fly around the airport to the east and north, keeping within 5 nmi (9.3 km; 5.8 mi), until lining up with runway 12, which faces toward the southeast. The aircraft crashed into mountains outside the 5 nmi (9.3 km; 5.8 mi) radius, about 8 nmi (15 km; 9.2 mi) north of the airport, facing almost due west, before it could line up for the runway 12 final approach.

The pilots did not send any emergency signals prior to the crash. Pakistani Interior Minister Rehman Malik stated that the aircraft was at 2,600 feet (790 m) as it approached Islamabad, but went back up to 3,000 feet (910 m) before eventually crashing. The altitude of 2,600 feet (790 m) was above the safe minimum descent altitude (2,510 feet (770 m) above sea level, or 852 feet (260 m) above ground level) had the aircraft remained within the 5 nmi (9.3 km; 5.8 mi) radius of the airport.

One witness on the ground, stated that the aircraft had "lost balance", and then it went down. Others described the aircraft as being lower than it should have been. One told The New York Times that the aircraft was "flying as low as a four-story building". Someone reported that as the aircraft started to turn, the right side of its front collided into the highest mountain, emitting an instant billow of blue fire and black smoke.

The aircraft wreckage was found near the Daman-e-Koh viewing point in the Margalla Hills outside Islamabad. The Los Angeles Times reported that "television footage of the crash site showed smoke and burning debris strewn in a swath cutting through the forest. Rescue helicopters hovered overhead. Fire was visible, and smoke was blowing up from the scene."

The weather conditions 19 minutes after the accident, as detailed by the 05:00 UTC METAR (aviation routine weather observation message) report for Benazir Bhutto International Airport, were: Wind from 090° at 18 kn (33 km/h; 21 mph). Visibility 3,500 m (2.2 mi; 1.9 nmi), rain, scattered clouds at 1,000 feet (300 m), few clouds at 3,000 feet (910 m) overcast at 10,000 feet (3,000 m). Temperature 25 °C (77 °F), dewpoint 24 °C (75 °F). QNH 1006.9 hPa. (Note: METAR raw data: OPRN 280500Z 09018KT 3500 RA SCT010 SCT030 OVC100 FEW030 25/24 Q1006.9)

=== Search and rescue ===
A local police official stated he had reports that the aircraft fell into the Margalla Hills area, as smoke was in the area, though they were not able to reach the site due to lack of access. An army helicopter arrived to survey the crash site at 10:30 local time (04:30 UTC), but was not able to land. Aerial inspection at the site did not find any surviving passengers or crew.

All 152 people on board were later confirmed dead. All hospitals in Islamabad were declared in a state of emergency.

Rescuers who were present at the scene reported that the bodies were mutilated and burnt and that the aircraft was totally destroyed by the impact, with its pieces and parts scattered over a large distance. Some parts were still burning, and the surrounding bushes also caught fire." Rescuers at the crash site reportedly were "digging through the rubble with their bare hands." A senior city government official stated that the rescue operation was "very difficult ... because of the rain. Most of the bodies are charred. We're sending body bags via helicopters."

The rescue operation was reported to be "chaotic". BBC Urdu reported the majority of those at the crash site were members of Pakistan's antiterrorism police, while only a few people were from search and rescue. Most were just "standing around, gazing at the burning debris" with nothing much to do. Reports were given of a threat from police officers to baton charge rescuers if they did not "move quickly". Their search-and-rescue operation was also hampered by the lack of coordination between rescuers and other government institutions, such as the military, the police, and the Capital Development Authority.

== Aircraft ==
The aircraft that crashed was an Airbus A321-231, registered AP-BJB, The aircraft was built in 2000, and had a manufacturer serial number of 1218.

This was the first fatal crash for the A321, and the second hull loss of the type. The aircraft had originally been delivered to Aero Lloyd and used by Aero Flight before being taken over by Airblue in 2006. It had accumulated over 34,000 flight hours in some 13,500 flights. The aircraft was previously struck by lightning on 30 December 2008.

== Passengers and crew ==
Flight 202 was carrying 146 passengers and 6 crew members. Of the passengers, 110 were men, 29 were women, 5 were children, and 2 were infants. Among the passengers were an active-duty captain of the Pakistan Army, six members of the Youth Parliament of Pakistan, and three off-duty flight attendants. The majority of the passengers were Pakistani. There were at least four foreign nationals. According to reports, one Somali diplomat, one Austrian, and two Americans were on board Flight 202.

The captain of Flight 202, 61-year-old Pervez-Iqbal Chaudhry, had 25,497 hours of flying experience, with 1,060 hours on the A320 aircraft. 34-year-old First Officer Muntajib-ud-Din Ahmed, a former F-16 Pakistan Air Force fighter pilot and squadron leader, had 1,837 hours of flying experience and 286 hours on the A320 aircraft.

Nationality	Passengers	Crew	Total	Ref.
Pakistan	142	6	148	
United States	2	0	2	
Austria	1	0	1	
Somalia	1	0	1	
Total	146	6	152	

== Reaction ==
A statement on Airblue's website stated, "Airblue, with great sadness, announces the loss of flight ED 202 inbound from Karachi to Islamabad. The flight crashed during poor weather and thick fog. We regret the loss of life and are investigating the exact circumstances of this tragedy. This will be presented as soon as possible." The statement continued, "our hearts go out to the families and loved ones of the passengers and crew." The compensation estimation process for the victims by Airblue's insurer began on 30 July 2010, with initial estimates of Rs 1,000,000 (US$11,169) per victim.

Both the Pakistani President Asif Ali Zardari and Prime Minister Yousaf Raza Gillani sent condolences to the families of those who died in the accident. The Pakistani government declared 29 July 2010 would be a national day of mourning and announced compensation of Rs 500,000 ( $5,847) to the family of every victim. U.S. President Barack Obama issued a statement confirming that two Americans had been on the flight and expressing condolences, and stated, "our thoughts and prayers go out to all of those touched by this horrible accident". The Airblue management decided that a monument would be built with the names of the victims inscribed onto it to honor the dead.

== Investigation ==
The Pakistan Civil Aviation Authority (CAA) immediately launched an investigation into the accident. Airbus stated that the company would provide full technical assistance to Pakistani authorities. A six-member Airbus team, headed by Nicolas Bardou, the company's director of flight safety, arrived in Islamabad on 29 July 2010.

The aircraft's flight recorders were located on 31 July, when Junaid Ameen, the director-general of the Pakistan CAA, told AFP, "the investigating committee found the black box from the Margalla Hills this morning ... the black box was found from the bulk of the wreckage of the crashed plane." He stated that the box would be examined by "foreign experts" in Germany or France, as Pakistan does not possess the equipment to decode the flight recorders. He also stated that the process of extracting information may take six months to a year.

The Pakistani authorities decided to send the cockpit voice recorder (CVR) and flight data recorder (FDR) to the Bureau of Enquiry and Analysis for Civil Aviation Safety (BEA) in France.

=== Conduct of approach ===
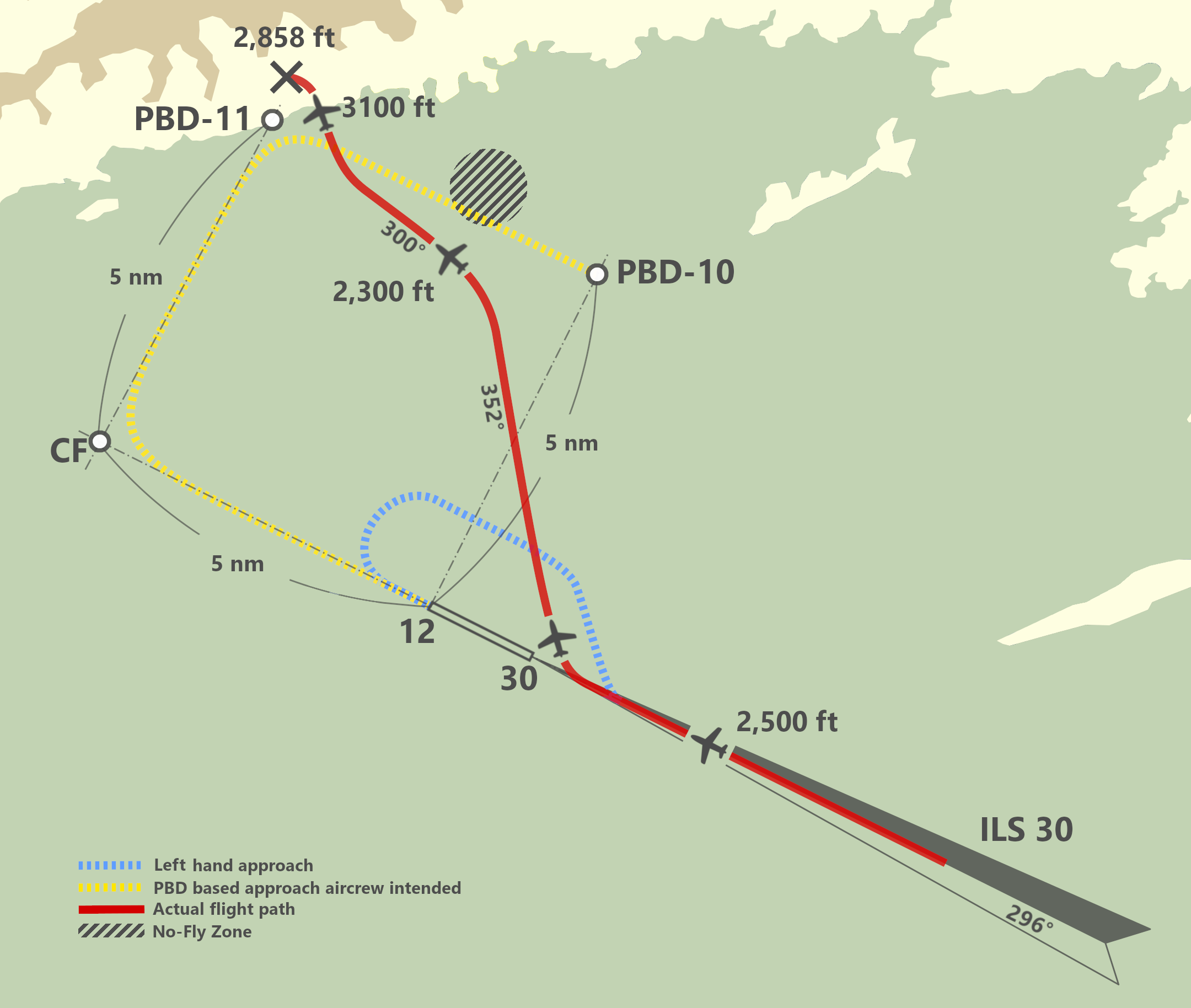
Comparison of established procedures track (blue) and the planned track (yellow) and actual track (red) of Flight 202. The planned track included the computer-generated waypoint CF: before reaching it, the crew had to enter another set of waypoints.

Flight 202 arrived in Islamabad from the southeast direction and the crew intended to land visually at runway 12. As Pakistan was drenched with rain at the time, the visibility had deteriorated to 3.5 kilometres (2.2 mi; 1.9 nmi). With low visibility, the crew had to use instrument landing for runway 30, the same runway but in the opposite direction, before they could land visually at runway 12. This required the pilots to circle around the runway until they were aligned. Specifically, the crew had to line up with runway 30, turn 45° to the right and maintain it for 30 seconds, turn left and fly parallel with the runway, wait for around 20 seconds after reaching abeam for the threshold of runway 12, turn 90° to the left, and later turn again to the left to align with runway 12. Each segment of the approach had been timed and the pilots needed to establish visual contact with the runway first before they could land. The entire circling approach must be conducted with a minimum altitude of 2,500 feet (760 m).

Surrounding the airport was an 8-kilometre-wide (5.0 mi; 4.3 nmi) protection zone, which was intended to be a safe zone for pilots to manoeuvre their aircraft so that they would never fly into the hills located behind the airport. All said procedures for a landing were required to be conducted within the protection zone. The crew, though, managed to fly well outside it and even flew towards Margala Hills, which was quite far from the zone boundary.

The recording of the FDR and CVR revealed that the pilot in command of the aircraft at the time, Captain Chaudhry, had significantly deviated from the established procedures for an approach to Islamabad. During the approach, he tried an unconventional approach by requesting a right-hand downwind approach, (Note: A right-hand downwind approach would have required flying south of the airport; this request was denied by ATC, twice. The captain then attempted a left-hand downwind approach (flying north of the airport) that significantly deviated from established procedures.) selected NAV mode, (Note: "NAV mode tells the autopilot to track your navigation source ... to keep the CDI (course deviation indicator) centered.") flew significantly close with the hills, and violated the airport's minimum descent altitude. At one point, he could be heard laughing off the order from the air traffic control (ATC) to enter a holding pattern and wait for the weather to improve, saying, "Let him say what he wants to say." He was also heard dismissing his first officer's concern on establishing visual with the airport, as he believed that no visual contact was needed as long as they had engaged the autopilot.

According to the recording, the captain initially did not feel anxious about his decision to deviate from the standard procedures for an approach to Islamabad. He even stated his intention to initiate the turn for a lineup with runway 12 at a distance where the aircraft was dangerously close with the hills. As a result, the ground proximity warning system (GPWS) sounded several times to warn the crew on their impending collision with terrain. In the last few seconds, Captain Chaudhry panicked and eventually caused the aircraft to fly directly towards the hills, rather than avoiding them.

=== Captain's arrogance ===
While numerous deviations from the standard operating procedures happened, the co-pilot of Flight 202, First Officer Ahmed, was largely unresponsive and passive about them, even when the aircraft was put in a dangerously close position to terrain. The recording showed that he had voiced his concerns several times, but the captain failed to correct their flight path.

Ahmed's muted behavior could be explained by the conflict that had happened on the initial segment of the flight. During Flight 202's initial climb, Captain Chaudhry decided to use this particular time to test First Officer Ahmed's knowledge. Unsatisfied with the result of the test, Captain Chaudhry berated his co-pilot and humiliated him in a "harsh, snobbish" tone. This lasted for about one hour. By the time Captain Chaudhry decided to stop, First Officer Ahmed had become quiet and submissive. He had fully lost his self-esteem, enabling Captain Chaudhry to freely do any violations from the standard procedures without any suggestions or corrective actions from the far less experienced Ahmed.

Captain Chaudhry's feeling of superiority was also shown later in the approach phase of the flight. He decided not to follow the ATC's suggestion to wait inside the holding pattern and dismissed his co-pilot's concern regarding establishing visual contact with the runway, despite this being crucial for the approach procedure. If the pilots had not established visual contact, abandoning the approach was required. He also continued the approach when the aircraft was already outside of the protected zone. When the GPWS sounded, he still continued the approach, despite the low altitude of the aircraft and warnings from his co-pilot. He also told First Officer Ahmed to falsify their ATC report when the controller asked on whether they had established visual contact.

=== Series of failures ===
Captain Chaudhry's test on First Officer Ahmed during the initial segment of the flight caused Ahmed's self-confidence to collapse, enabling Chaudhry to fly the aircraft without many restrictions. His errors on controlling the aircraft eventually caused Flight 202 to crash. During the approach, he insisted to ATC several times to make a right-hand, downwind approach. ATC refused to grant his request and Captain Chaudhry decided to comply with the procedure. Then, for reasons unknown, he decided to disobey the procedures, in which he selected the NAV mode, which was not allowed during an approach.

The lateral navigation of the Airbus A321's flight management system consisted of two modes—the "selected" mode and the "managed" (NAV) mode. Pilots use a knob to select their intended heading. By using the "selected" mode, the pilots simply just need to put their desired heading by turning the knob. The autopilot then will turn the aircraft towards the heading and the heading will be maintained by the autopilot. In a circling approach, pilots normally use the selected mode. In the "NAV" mode, the pilots can plan a set of headings and the autopilot will follow the established route. Therefore, the pilots do not need to continuously put new heading into the autopilot, contrary to the "selected" mode.

By selecting the NAV mode, the computer of the Airbus A321 had to search for new waypoints, as no NAV-mode approach data were available for runway 12. The computer finally found a waypoint, named as waypoint CF, although it was located outside of the protected zone. Captain Chaudhry decided to create another set of waypoints that would eventually lead to waypoint CF. Afterwards, the Captain stated that they would fly towards the made-up waypoints first and then follow the made-up route before the planned turn towards waypoint CF. First Officer Ahmed did not protest anything and decided to follow along.

Captain Chaudhry then engaged the NAV mode. By this time, he had delayed the turn towards the waypoints for quite some time. As a result, they were well outside of the protected zone. With an altitude of just about 2,300 feet (700 m), the GPWS sounded. First Officer Ahmed warned Captain Chaudhry about the GPWS, but Captain Chaudhry insisted to continue to fly to the waypoints, though he began to sound uncertain. A flight controller in Islamabad, who noticed that Flight 202 had gone astray, then decided to ask the crew on whether they had established visual contact with the runway, which the crew answered with a lie.

As they faced another warning from the GPWS, Captain Chaudhry finally decided to turn the aircraft towards the left. To do so, he was required to enter his desired heading by turning the knob and then change the lateral navigation from NAV mode to the "selected" mode. To engage the "selected" mode, the heading knob should be pulled outward. In the case of Flight 202, Captain Chaudhry forgot to pull the knob. Hence, the "selected" mode was not engaged. The autopilot did not manage to receive the desired heading and the aircraft stayed on its course, heading towards the hills. Bewildered, Captain Chaudhry turned the heading knob further to the left.

Captain Chaudhry finally realized that the heading knob had not been engaged, so he pulled the knob outward, but during his moment of confusion earlier, he had turned the knob to the left enough that the heading eventually looped all the way back to the right. As he decided to engage the "selected" mode, instead of turning left, the aircraft turned to the right directly towards Margalla Hills. Sensing danger, the aircraft's GPWS ordered the pilots to pull up. Captain Chaudhry added the throttles and pulled the aircraft up, albeit not steeply enough.

Captain Chaudhry, now confused with his own aircraft, yelled, "Why is the aircraft not turning left?" He then decided to fly the aircraft manually, causing the aircraft to bank 52° to the left with a nose-down attitude. The now-frantic First Officer Ahmed tried to warn Captain Chaudhry on the surrounding terrain multiple times, thus Captain Chaudhry tried to pull the aircraft up, but due to their low altitude, they failed to recover the aircraft.

=== Conclusion ===
The report issued by Pakistan's CAA in November 2011 cited a lack of professionalism in the cockpit crew, along with poor weather, as primary factors in the crash. In particular, the report noted that the CVR and FDR confirmed that the captain ignored or did not properly respond to a multitude of air traffic control directives and automated terrain warning systems. The report also claimed that the first officer passively accepted the captain's actions, after the captain on multiple occasions throughout the entire flight took a "harsh, snobbish, and contrary" tone with the first officer and "berated" him.

The report concluded that the crash was a controlled flight into terrain accident, in which aircrew failed to display sufficient judgment and professional skills in a self-created unsafe environment. In their determination to land in inclement weather, they committed serious violations of procedures and breaches of flying discipline, which put the aircraft in an unsafe condition over dangerous terrain at low altitude.

== Aftermath ==
Representatives of family members of passengers on the flight questioned the validity of the report and the qualifications of those who carried out the investigation. In 2012, following extensive scrutiny from the public and officials regarding the report's lack of quality, Peshawar High Court ordered the Pakistani government to reinvestigate the crash with assistance from the International Civil Aviation Organization (ICAO). The revised report was eventually sent to ICAO in November 2012, but ICAO expressed disappointment with the final report, describing it as incomprehensive. They stated that the investigating authority, Pakistan's Safety Investigation Board (SIB), was not independent and issued a recommendation to independently revise the final report.

Disappointed with the handling of the investigation, some relatives of the victims filed a petition to make the investigative body of CAA, the SIB, into an independent and autonomous body. The petition was supported and jointly filed by politician Marvi Memon. The Pakistani federal government claimed that the proposed law had been prepared for submission to the prime minister. The bill was reportedly still pending in the senate, however, and was yet to be passed by the parliament. This bill was delayed for years until Pakistan faced another aviation disaster in December 2016 (PIA Flight 661).

Following the crash of Flight 202, Airblue promised family members that a memorial would be erected. The memorial was to cost Rs20 million and the final design was finalized in June 2011. The memorial was eventually constructed near Daman-e-Koh.

On the 10th anniversary of the crash, Islamabad authorities planted 152 trees along the track of Yadgar-e-Shuhada. The trees were to represent the number of people who were killed in the crash.

== In popular culture ==
The crash was featured in season 26, episode 5 of the Canadian documentary series Mayday, also known as Air Crash Investigation, titled "Peril Over Pakistan".

== See also ==
- Impact of culture on aviation safety
- Accidents and incidents involving the Airbus A320 family
- American Airlines Flight 965 – 1995 aviation accident in Colombia
- Armavia Flight 967 – 2006 aviation accident in the Black Sea
- 2017 Teterboro Learjet crash – Crashed during circle-to-land approach with lack of professionalism in the cockpit
