= Weißkirchen radio transmitter =

Coordinates: 50°11′1.5″N 8°36′42.3″E

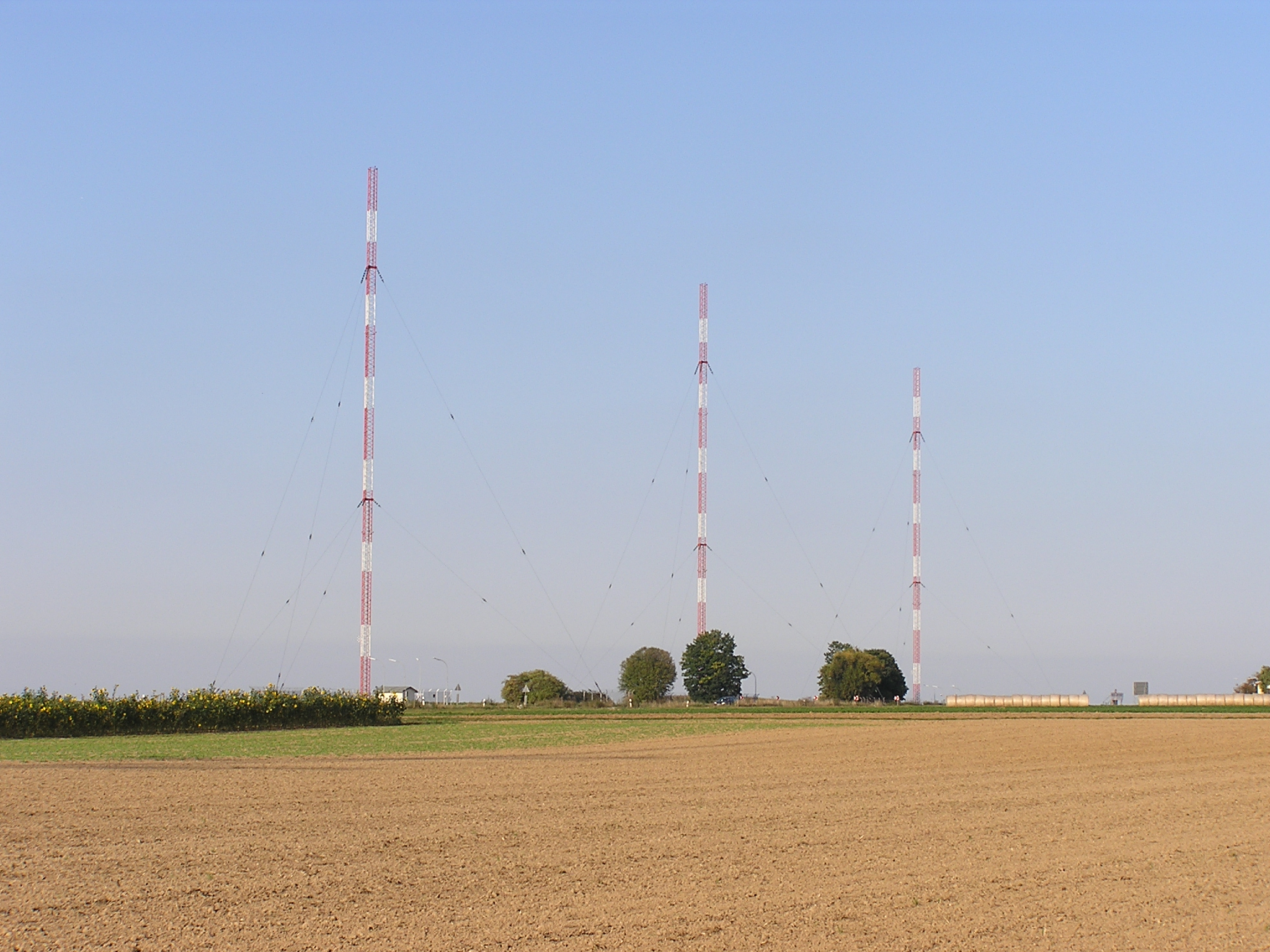
The Weißkirchen transmitter

The Weißkirchen radio transmitter was a medium-wave broadcasting facility located near Weißkirchen, Oberursel, Germany. It was the most powerful European AM transmitter of the American Forces Network and transmitted on 873 kHz with a power of 150 kilowatts. It started operation in May 1951 on 872 kHz and moved its frequency to 873 kHz in 1978 according to the regulations of Waveplan of Geneva. The transmitter ceased broadcasting on 31 May 2013, and was decommissioned in September 2014. Its aerial consisted of three guyed lattice steel masts built in 1954–55. These masts, each eighty-six metres tall and insulated against ground, were arranged in a row with a distance of 140 metres between each mast. On 23 April 2015 the aerial was dismantled.

As the numbers of American forces stationed in Europe has waxed and waned over the years, in response to developments in politics such as the end of the Cold War, this transmitter remained operational, though its observed signal strength appeared increasingly less able to compete with other medium-wave broadcasters compared to reception reports made in the early to mid-1970s. For many European listeners in the 1970s and '80s, its relays of United States domestic networks provided the only American radio receivable in Germany, apart from stations specifically intended for overseas reception, such as the Voice of America.

== See also ==
- List of masts
