= Frankfurt International School =

International school in Hesse, Germany

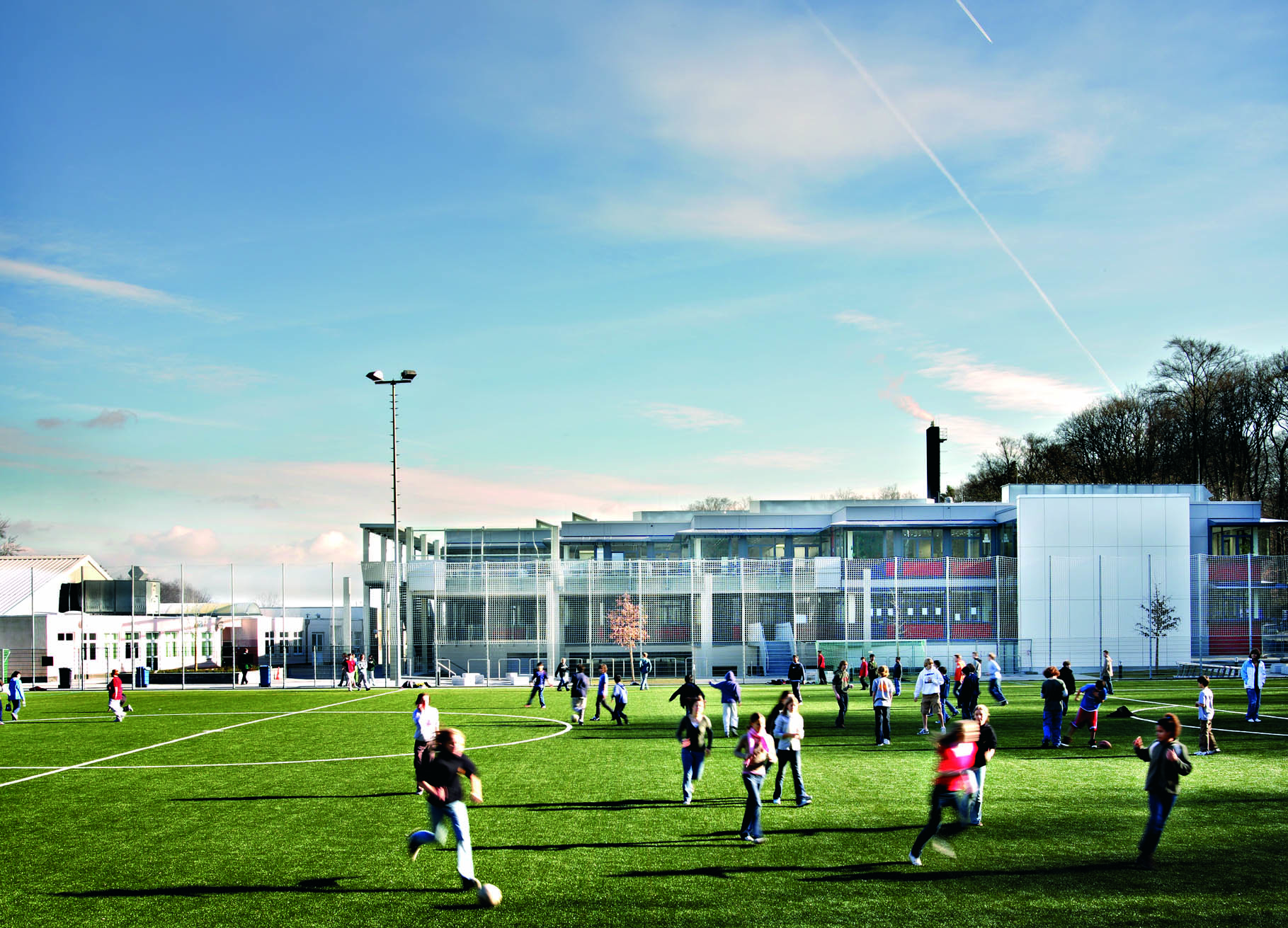
- Main campus of Frankfurt International School in Oberursel

Location
- An der Waldlust 15; Oberursel (Taunus) and Wiesbaden-Naurod, Hesse; Germany; 50°12′33″N 8°34′08″E

Information
- Type: International school, Private school
- Established: 1961
- Headmaster: Paul M. Fochtman
- Faculty: approx. 300
- Grades: Pre-K–12
- Enrollment: approx. 1,800
- Language: English
- Website: www.fis.edu

The Frankfurt International School (FIS) is an independent, international private school with campuses in Oberursel (Taunus) and Wiesbaden-Naurod in the Rhine-Main region, Hesse, Germany. With approximately 1,800 students from more than 60 nations, it is one of the oldest and largest international schools in Europe. The school is operated by a registered non-profit association of the same name.

== History ==
The school was founded in 1961 in Frankfurt am Main by six families, including representatives of the US and British armed forces, diplomats, and international corporations. The goal was to provide an English-language education following international standards for children of international families.

Due to rapid student growth, the school relocated in 1963 to Oberursel at the edge of the Taunus mountains, which remains its main campus and administrative center. In 1992, the school expanded by opening a second branch (Wiesbaden Campus) in Wiesbaden-Naurod to serve the western Rhine-Main area.

Frankfurt International School was one of the original schools involved in the development and introduction of the International Baccalaureate (IB) Diploma Programme in the 1960s. FIS has offered the IB Diploma Programme for more than 50 years and is home to one of the largest IB programmes in Germany, with a broad selection of courses across subject areas. Students have consistently achieved average IB Diploma scores approximately 5–6 points above the global average. The size of the programme allows FIS to offer a wide range of subject combinations, accommodating students with different academic interests and university goals.

== Campuses and Infrastructure ==
FIS operates across two locations:

=== Oberursel Campus ===
The main campus is divided into two primary sections:

- Primary School: Serving children from pre-school (First Steps / Early Years) through Grade 5.
- Upper School: Serving Grades 6 through 12.

Facilities include a Fine Arts Center, the Stroth Center sports complex, science labs, libraries, an artificial turf field, and an all-weather running track.

=== Wiesbaden Campus ===
Situated just outside of Wiesbaden in Naurod, the Wiesbaden Campus serves approximately 200 students in pre-school through grade 8.

=== Transport ===
FIS operates its own extensive school bus network across the Rhine-Main region, considered one of the largest private school transport systems in Europe.

== Academic Profile and Qualifications ==
As an accredited IB World School, FIS offers an international curriculum spanning from pre-school through Grade 12. Qualifications include:

- The IB Diploma
- The FIS High School Diploma
- Individual IB Subject Certificates

The IB Diploma is recognized in Germany as equivalent to the German Abitur, provided students meet specific subject selection and examination requirements established by the German education authorities (KMK). Students who meet these requirements can have their IB results converted into a German Abitur-equivalent grade, allowing them to apply directly to German universities.

The primary language of instruction is English. English as an Additional Language (EAL) support is available for non-native speakers. German is taught at native and foreign language levels, alongside French and Spanish.

== Student Life and Accreditations ==
Students participate in extracurricular activities, sports competing in the German International Schools Sports Tournaments (GISST), Model United Nations (MUN), and Service Learning projects.

FIS is accredited by or a member of:

- International Baccalaureate Organization (IBO)
- Council of International Schools (CIS)
- New England Association of Schools and Colleges (NEASC)
- Educational Collaborative for International Schools (ECIS)
