= Airblue =

Private airline of Pakistan

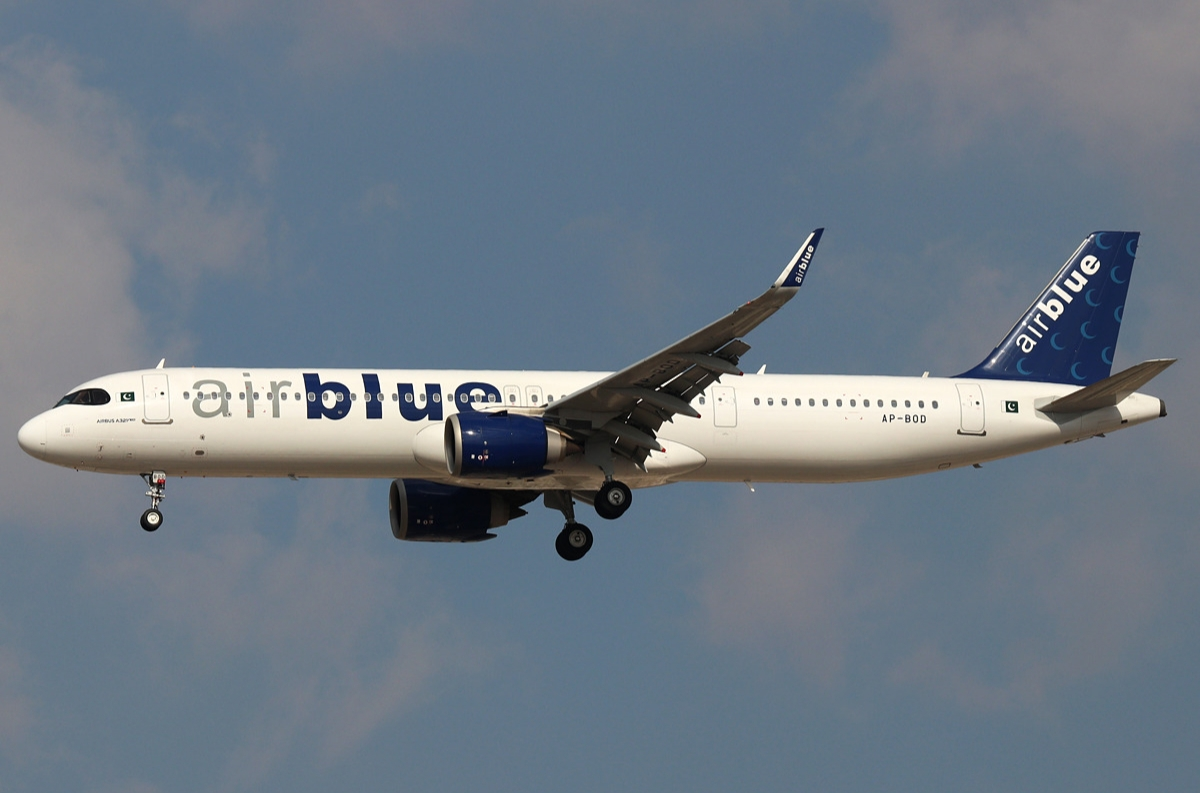
- Airblue A321neo
IATA	ICAO	Call sign
PA (2012-present). ED (2003-2012)	ABQ	AIRBLUE
- Founded: 2003; 23 years ago
- Commenced operations: 18 June 2004; 22 years ago
- Operating bases: Abu Dhabi; Dubai–International; Islamabad; Jeddah; Karachi; Lahore
- Frequent-flyer program: Blue Miles
- Fleet size: 12
- Destinations: 22
- Headquarters: Islamabad Stock Exchange Towers; Islamabad-44000, Pakistan
- Key people: Tariq Chaudhary (Founder & CEO)
- Website: www.airblue.com

Airblue Limited (stylized as airblue) is a private Pakistani airline with its head office on the ground floor of the Islamabad Stock Exchange (ISE) Tower in Islamabad, Pakistan. Airblue operates scheduled domestic and international flights, the latter to Saudi Arabia and the United Arab Emirates. As of May 2026, the airline serves three countries and 25 routes.

== History ==
=== Initial years (2003–2010) ===
The airline was established in 2003 by Tariq Chaudhary, a Pakistani-American IT professional. Airblue started operations on 18 June 2004 with three leased Airbus A320-200 aircraft serving Karachi–Lahore, and Karachi–Islamabad with three daily flights in each direction. The airline was inaugurated in 2004 by Prime Minister Zafarullah Khan Jamali.

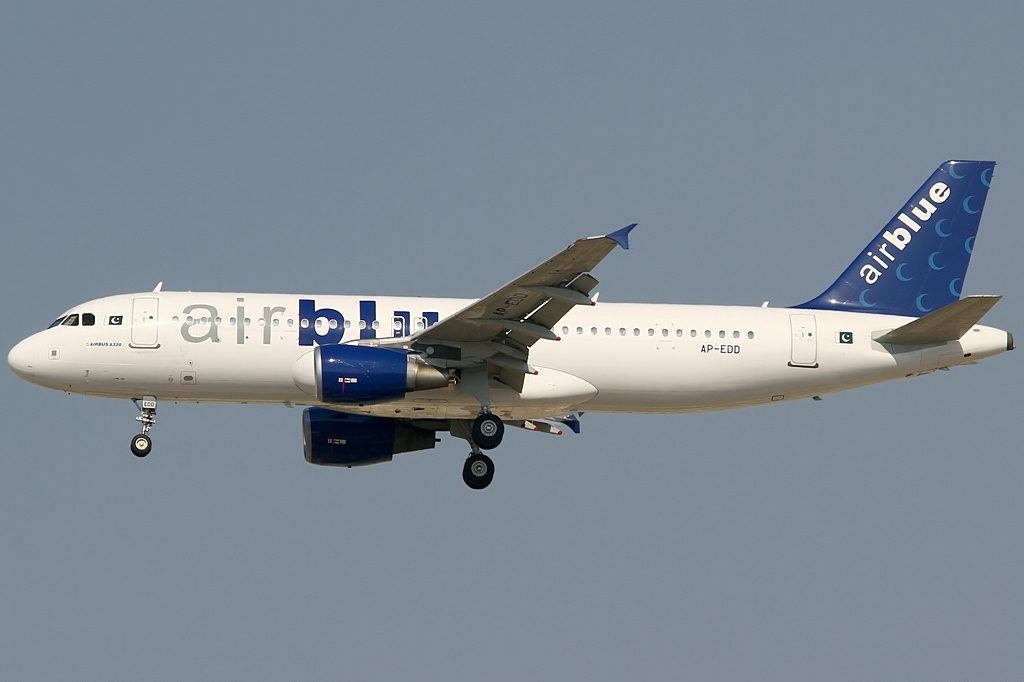
An Airblue Airbus A320-200

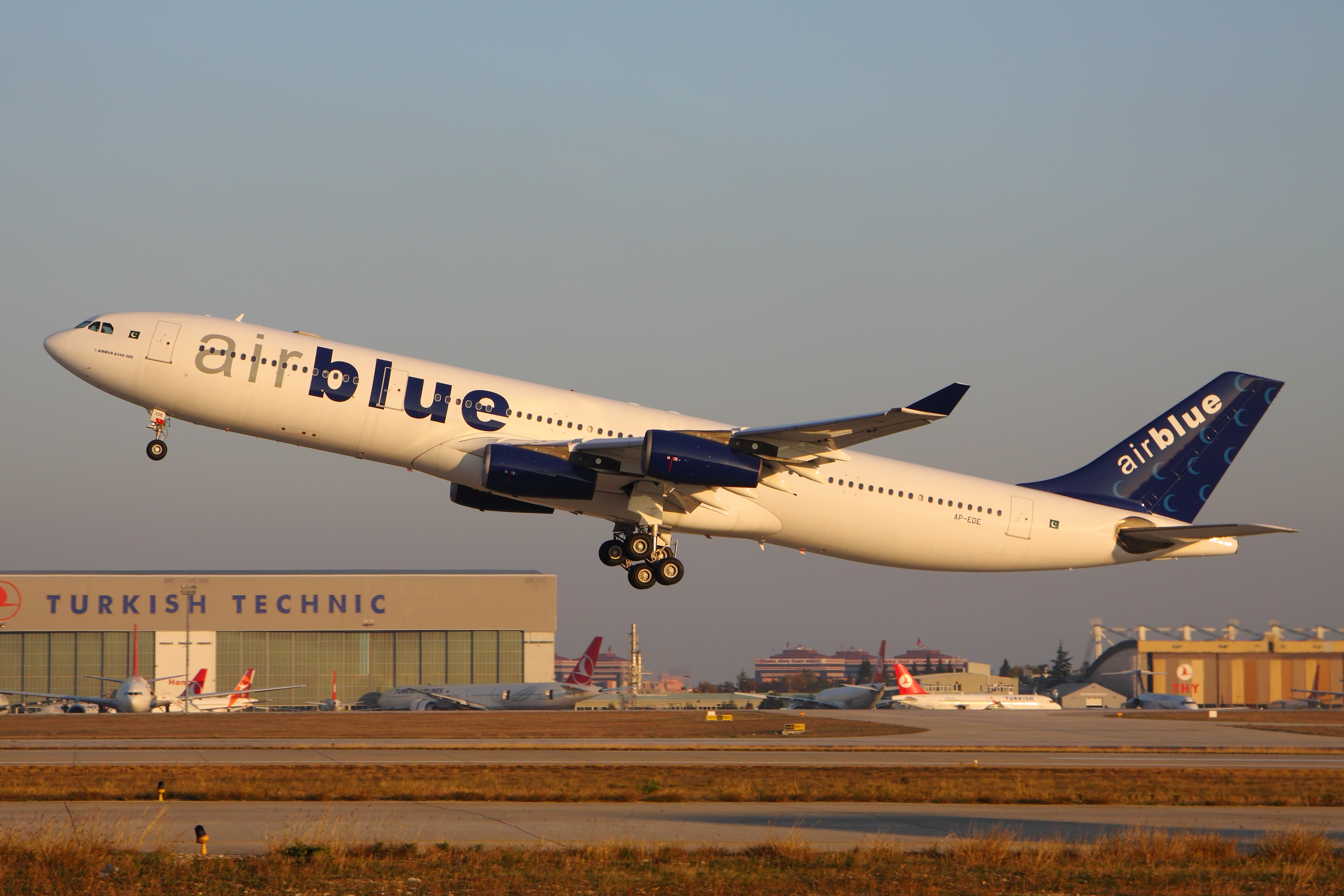
A now-retired Airblue Airbus A340-300 taking off from Istanbul Atatürk Airport

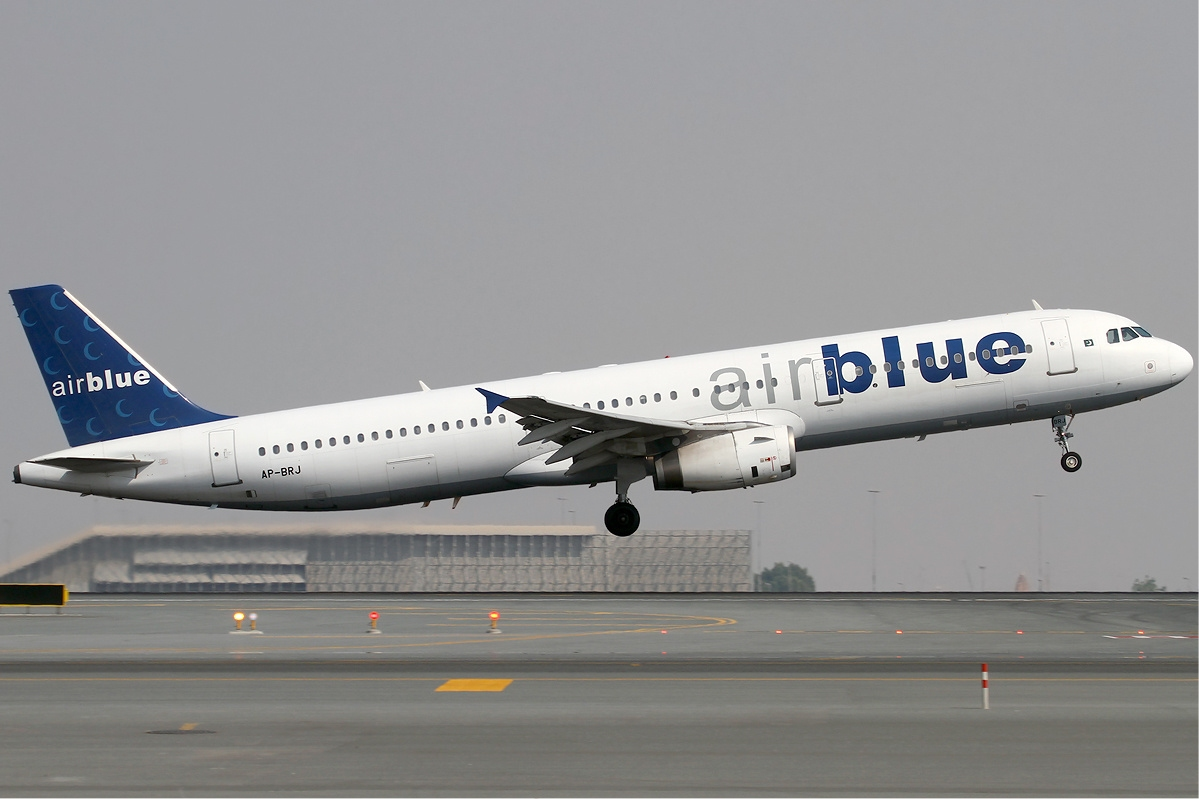
Airblue A321-100

During the first years, the airline was profitable, with profit after taxation increasing from Rs. 82 million in 205 to Rs 153 million in 2006. During this time, the airline to compete directly with the flag carrier Pakistan International Airlines and the two other private carriers on mostly domestic front, flying more than 400,000 passengers in the first year with a load factor of over 90%. The airline expanded its domestic network to include flights to Peshawar and Quetta. It also had to fly the routes known as socia economic routes or tertiary routes as part of the licence from Pakistan Civil Aviation Authority. Hence flights to Sukkur and Nawabshah were added briefly as part of the tertiary routes under obligation.

On 14 August 2005, Airblue launched its first international flight from Karachi to Dubai. On 4 June 2007, Airblue launched its inaugural flight to Manchester using the Airbus A321. Due to range issue, the Manchester route was initially routed through Istanbul’s Sabiha Gökçen International Airport, and later via Trabzon airport. These stops were only refueling stops where the plane landed, passengers disembarked and waited in the transit hall. The aircraft refueled and the passengers boarded the plane again to continue their flight to destination.

=== 2010s ===
Airblue changed its IATA code from ED to PA in June 2012, the new code originally belonged to the defunct and once iconic carrier Pan American World Airways. In 2011 the airline launched service to Istanbul’s Sabiha Gokcen Airport - a route that was soon terminated.

In June 2012, Airblue finalised an agreement to acquire one Airbus A320 and two leased A340-300s for existing and new international routes. An ATR 72-600 came to Pakistan on wetlease, but the plan was dropped and the leased ATR was returned only 1 week after operations began

In 2018, Chaudhary founded a United States-based subsidiary named Airbahn, planned to operate from Southern California initially using 2 A320 aircraft leased from Airblue. Operations never begun however, and their certificate was rejected in 2022 by the Department of Transportation.

The A340s joined the fleet in October 2012, enabling the airline to strengthen its Manchester route with nonstop flights as well as launch a second UK destination Birmingham in September 2013 and connect both stations with Lahore. The A340s later also flew to the Middle East. Technical issues related to the aircraft eventually led to them being phased out by January 2014; they had been leased for a five-year term. UK operations also ended with Birmingham being dropped after just three months' service and Manchester ending in January 2014.

=== 2020s ===
In July 2022, AirBlue became the second Pakistani airline to start flights to Skardu International Airport, the highest airport of Pakistan.

On October 2024, AirBlue received its first Airbus A321Neo leased from GE Capital Aviation Services out of two A321Neos ordered. The airline became the first and only operator of an Airbus next-gen airplane in Pakistan.

In June 2025, AirBlue received clearance to operate flights to the UK alongside PIA. After receiving the TCO certificate, the airline hinted at beginning flights to Leeds Bradford Airport, which it had previously served. As of October 2025, there are no clear indications of UK operations beginning soon.

In early November 2026, airblue cut 300 jobs in various sectors including cabin crew and maintenance after a formal reassessment, which was influenced by the middle-east crisis and the resulting increase in costs.

== Destinations ==
=== Destinations ===
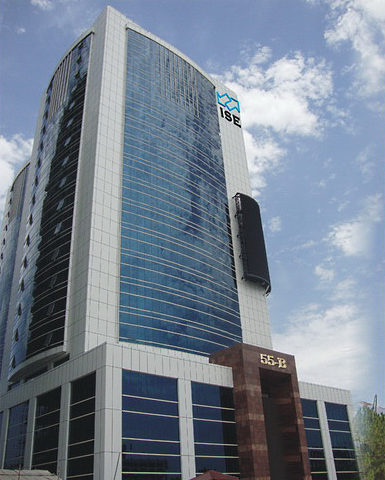
Islamabad Stock Exchange Towers - Airblue's headquarters

Airblue serves the following destinations as of December 2025:

Country	City	Airport	Status	Refs
Azerbaijan	Baku	Heydar Aliyev International Airport		
China	Guangzhou	Guangzhou Baiyun International Airport	Terminated	
Pakistan	Islamabad	Islamabad International Airport	Base	
Pakistan	Karachi	Jinnah International Airport	Base	
Pakistan	Lahore	Allama Iqbal International Airport	Base	
Pakistan	Multan	Multan International Airport		
Pakistan	Skardu	Skardu International Airport		
Pakistan	Peshawar	Peshawar Airport	Terminated	
Pakistan	Quetta	Quetta Airport		
Pakistan	Sukkur	Sukkur Airport	Terminated	
Saudi Arabia	Dammam	King Fahd International Airport		
Saudi Arabia	Jeddah	King Abdulaziz International Airport		
Saudi Arabia	Riyadh	King Khalid International Airport		
Turkey	Trabzon	Trabzon Airport	Terminated	
United Arab Emirates	Abu Dhabi	Zayed International Airport		
United Arab Emirates	Dubai	Dubai International Airport		
United Arab Emirates	Ras Al Khaimah	Ras Al Khaimah International Airport	Terminated	Terminated
United Arab Emirates	Sharjah	Sharjah International Airport		
United Kingdom	Manchester	Manchester Airport	Terminated	
United Kingdom	Birmingham	Birmingham Airport	Terminated	

== Services ==
=== Cabin ===
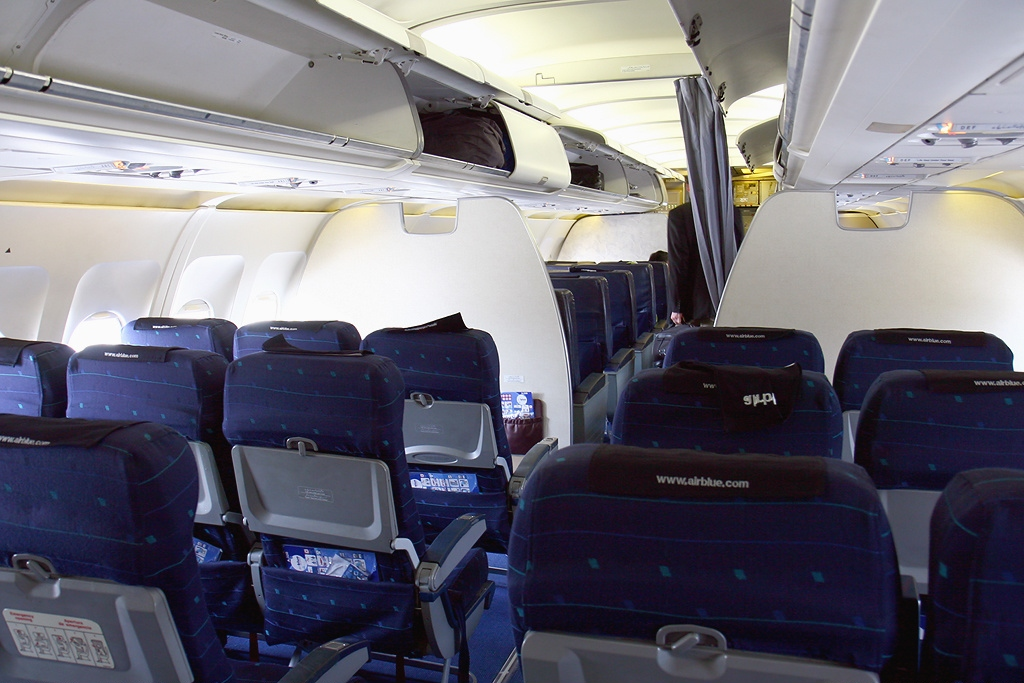
The interior of an Airblue Airbus A320-200

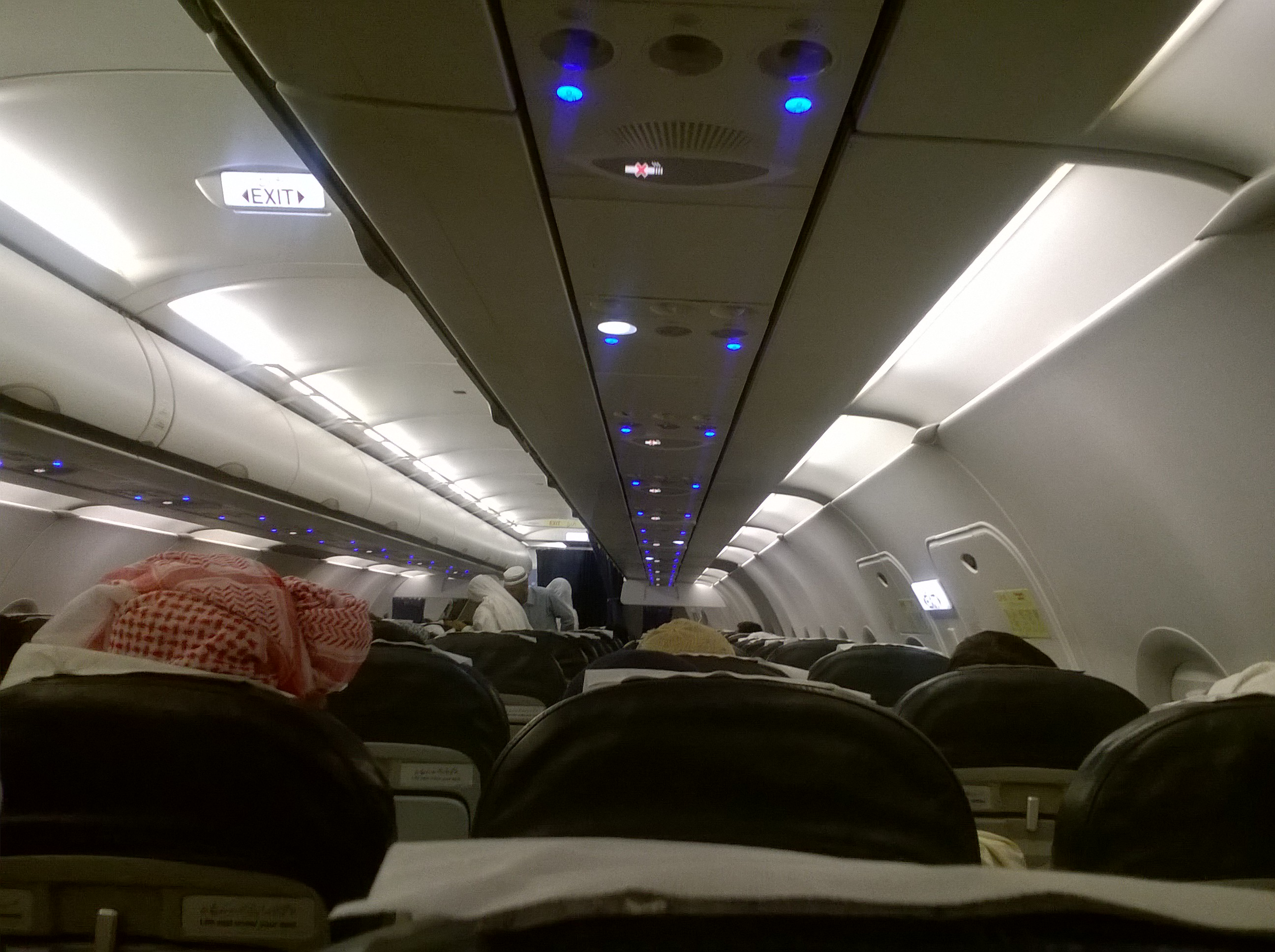
The interior of an Airblue Airbus A321-200

All aircraft in the fleet have a (3 + 3) layout in an all-economy cabin; and have overhead video screens. Airblue formerly had a business class section but dropped it due to exogenous economic factors.

=== eTicketing ===
Airblue was the first airline in Pakistan to introduce e-ticketing, wireless check-in, and self-check-in kiosk facilities. The airline also uses Sabre, a ticket distribution system.

=== Frequent-flyer program ===
The Airblue frequent flyer program is called "Blue Miles". Passengers start at the base level where sign-up is free. Once passengers earn enough miles, there are upgrades to the Blue Card followed by the Platinum Card. In May 2009, the airline allied with Faysal Bank to offer credit cards.

=== Lounges ===
Airblue inaugurated its premium lounge at Jinnah International Airport, Karachi in November 2008. It has since been closed. Named the Blue Lounge International, it was designed for business class passengers, credit card holders, and privileged customers. The lounge offered Internet facilities, cable television, newspapers and magazines, massage chairs, and a snack bar. It was located in the international terminal of the airport.

=== Cargo operations ===
Airblue has launched an e-Cargo service to cater to air freight markets of Pakistan, the United Arab Emirates, and the United Kingdom. According to a press release, e-Cargo will broaden the base of cargo and permit certified agents to book freight directly online opening the inventory through Web.

== Fleet ==
=== Current fleet ===
As of September 2026, Airblue operates the following aircraft:

Aircraft	In service	Orders	Passenger capacity	Notes
Airbus A320-200	5	-	180	
Airbus A321-200	5	-	220	
Airbus A320neo	-	3	-	To be leased from Macquarie Airfinance
Airbus A321neo	2	-	235	
Total	12	3		

=== Former fleet ===
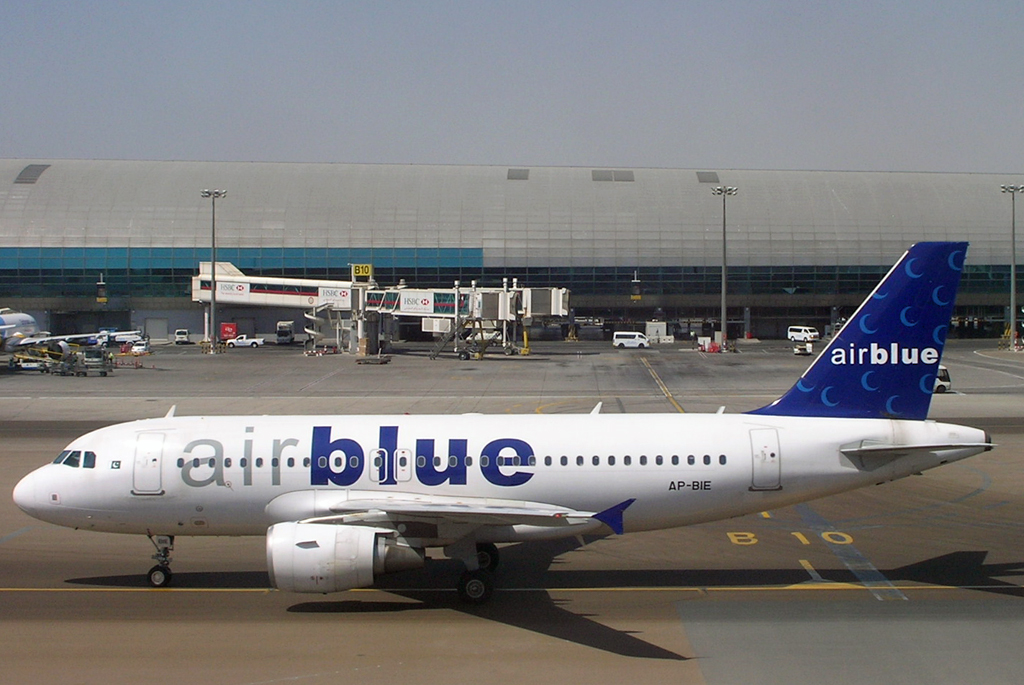
Airblue Airbus A319, 2012

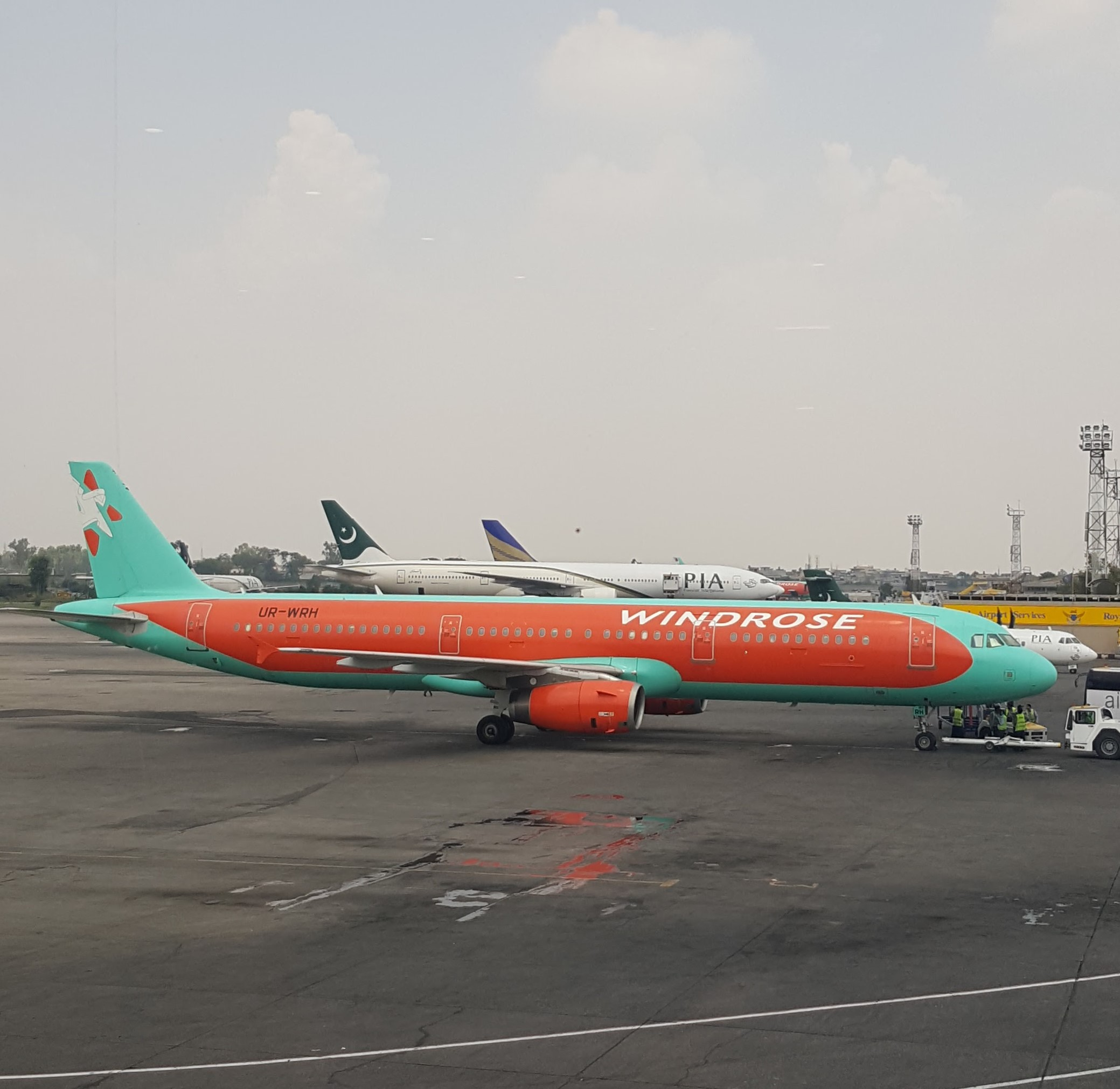
Airblue Airbus A321-200 leased from Windrose Airlines, 2016

Aircraft	Introduced	Retired	Notes
Airbus A319-100	2008	2014	
Airbus A321-200	2006	2010	Crashed as ED202
Airbus A330-200	2015	2016	
Airbus A340-300	2012	2014	
ATR 72-600	2015	2015	

== Accidents and incidents ==
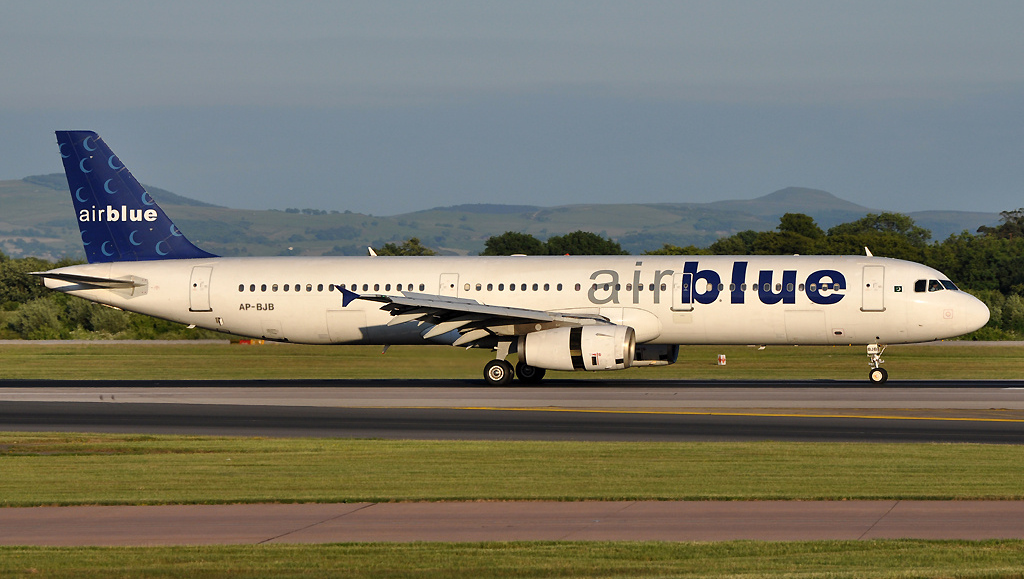
Airblue Flight 202, registration AP-BJB crashed as on 28 July 2010. The aircraft is pictured one month before.

- On 28 July 2010, Airblue Flight 202, flying a domestic route from Karachi to Islamabad with 146 passengers and 6 crew on board crashed into the Margalla Hills. The aircraft was on final approach to Benazir Bhutto International Airport during poor weather conditions when the aircraft impacted the Margalla Hills about 10 nm (18.52 km) north of the airport at an elevation of about 1,000 feet (300 m) above the city. Radio contact with the aircraft was lost at approx. 09:45 local time. All 152 passengers and crew on board the aircraft were killed in the crash. The aircraft involved was an Airbus A321-200 registered as AP-BJB.
- On 23 April 2019, an A320, registered AP-EDA and operating PA613 from Sharjah to Peshawar suffered a runway excursion on landing. The aircraft stopped beyond the end of the runway, but still on paved surface. No injuries were reported, and the aircraft was repaired and returned to service.

== Partnerships ==
In November 2017 Airblue extended its partnership with PepsiCo. Airblue had a contractual partnership with the Ukrainian Windrose Airlines for a three-year wet-lease of some Windrose aircraft. These aircraft carried the Windrose livery with Windrose crew and a mixture of Windrose and Airblue cabin crew. This wet-lease expired in 2016.

== See also ==
- List of airlines of Pakistan
- AirSial
- SereneAir
- Fly Jinnah
