= Leisure Air =

IATA	ICAO	Call sign
L8	LWD	LEISURE WORLD
- Founded: 1992; 34 years ago
- Ceased operations: February 1995; 30 years ago
- Operating bases: Chicago-O'Hare; Hartford / Windsor Locks, CT; Boston International Airport; Detroit International Airport; Los Angeles; Oakland; San Francisco; Atlanta
- Fleet size: 15 (during operations)
- Destinations: Various scheduled (see below) as well as charter
- Headquarters: Winston-Salem, North Carolina, United States

Leisure Air was an American airline based in Winston-Salem, North Carolina. Beginning as a charter airline, the company expanded to offer scheduled service to major cities as a discount carrier. It operated from 1992 until 1995, when it filed for Chapter 11 bankruptcy protection and then ceased operations.

== History ==
Leisure Air was established in 1992 with its base in Winston-Salem, North Carolina. It flew charter flights using five leased Airbus A320s, four McDonnell Douglas DC-10s and two Boeing 757s. The charter flights were operated to the southwest United States, Mexico and the Caribbean. Also it operated charters from Los Angeles and San Francisco to Hawaii using the DC-10s, Oakland to Mexico and Chicago using the A320s. Those DC-10s were also used for charter flights to Europe during the summer of 1994, for World Cup soccer fans, including flights to Shannon and Dublin, Ireland; Amsterdam, Netherlands and Brussels, Belgium.

After beginning with charter service, Leisure Air expanded to offering scheduled service to several domestic and international destinations. It operated as a discount airline, selling coast-to-coast seats for as little as $99 one way. Part of its strategy was to control costs by contracting out its reservations service and renting airport counter space from other carriers for $150 a flight. One of its gimmicks to keep costs low was to offer turkey sandwiches for every meal. The airline carried 1,000 to 1,200 passengers a day on seven to eight flights.

Harold J. (Hap) Pareti started Leisure Air. He previously was one of the founders of People Express.

=== Scheduled services in 1994 ===
According to the September 15, 1994 edition of the Official Airline Guide (OAG), Leisure Air was operating scheduled flights on these routes with the following jet aircraft types:

- Airbus A320: New York Kennedy Airport (JFK) - St. Lucia, West Indies (UVF) - Antigua, West Indies (ANU), Boston (BOS) - Orlando (MCO), Hartford (BDL) - West Palm Beach (PBI), Hartford (BDL) - Orlando (MCO) - West Palm Beach (PBI), and Detroit (DTW) - Orlando (MCO), Detroit - Cancun, Mexico (CUN), Boston (BOS) - Ft. Myers (RSW) - Ft.Lauderdale (FLL)
- Boeing 757-200: Boston (BOS) - Las Vegas (LAS), Boston (BOS) - Los Angeles (LAX), Boston (BOS) - Orlando (MCO), and Boston (BOS) - San Francisco (SFO)
- McDonnell Douglas DC-10: Los Angeles (LAX) - Maui (OGG) - Honolulu (HNL) - (LAX), San Francisco (SFO) - Maui (OGG) - Honolulu (HNL) - (SFO), New York Kennedy Airport (JFK) - Port of Spain, Trinidad (POS) - Georgetown, Guyana (GEO), and Boston (BOS) - San Francisco (SFO), San Francisco (SFO) - London Stansted, UK (STN), San Francisco (SFO) - Newark (EWR)

Also according to the OAG, none of the above flights were operated on a daily basis and in most cases were only operated once a week on the above routes.

=== Safety concerns ===
When the Federal Aviation Administration (FAA) found irregularities in the maintenance records of the McDonnell Douglas DC-10s, the operating license for the DC-10s and Boeing 757s were withdrawn. Due to this, only the Airbus A320s continued to operate but at a much reduced scale.

The safety violations were found during an inspection relating to the airline's planned move from Winston-Salem to McLean, Virginia. The airline stated that the safety concerns involved missing documents for two of its leased aircraft.

Flights were suspended on November 18, 1994, after the airline was unable to demonstrate compliance with FAA safety regulations. On November 25, 1994, the FAA announced it had allowed Leisure Air to resume flying some of its planes, and said it would closely monitor the airline to assure safe operations.

=== Collapse ===
The airline filed for Chapter 11 bankruptcy protection in January 1995. Two weeks later, it suspended operations.

In February 1995, following the safety concerns and aircraft restrictions, Leisure Air finally ceased all operations.

== Fleet ==
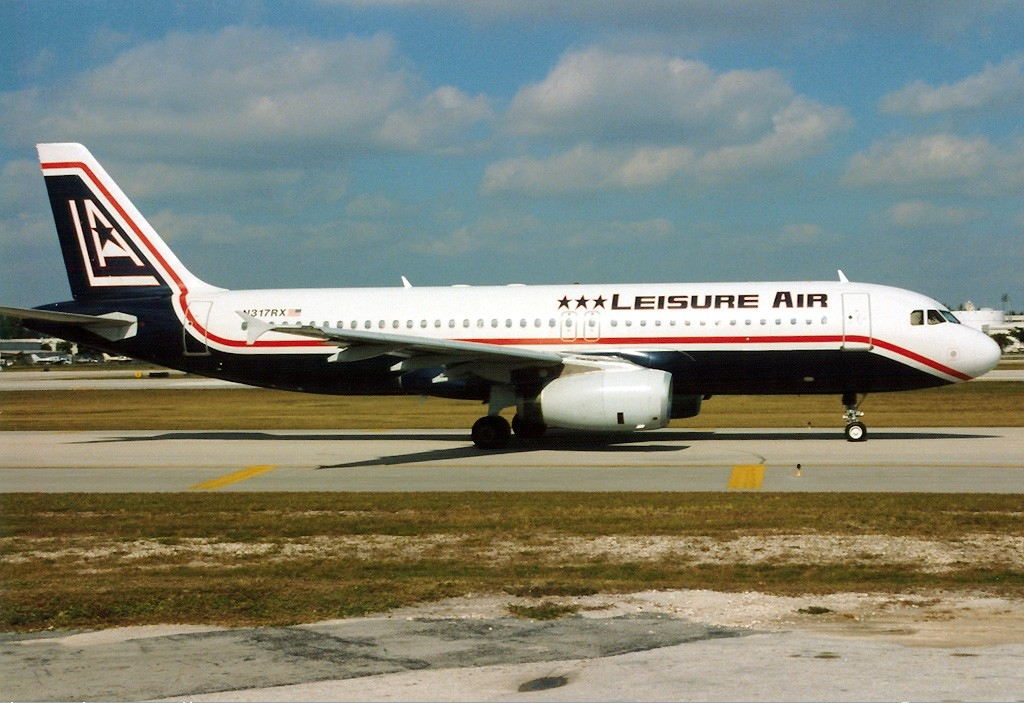
A Leisure Air Airbus A320 at Fort Lauderdale, Florida. (1993)

The Leisure Air fleet consisted of the following aircraft throughout operations:

Leisure Air Fleet
Aircraft	In Fleet	Notes
Airbus A320-200	8	1 leased from ILFC; 4 leased from Orix; 2 leased from Translift Airways
Boeing 757-200	2	1 leased from AWAS; 1 leased from ILFC
McDonnell Douglas DC-10-10	2	Leased from United Airlines
McDonnell Douglas DC-10-30	3	1 leased from Dormacken Ltd; 2 leased from Polaris Aircraft Leasing Corporation
Total	15	

== See also ==
- List of defunct airlines of the United States
