= Frankfurt Rhein-Main Regional Authority =

Cooperation body of the administratively fragmented Frankfurt urban area

Coordinates: 50.1°N 8.7°E

Regional Authority of Frankfurt Rhein-Main Regionalverband Frankfurt Rhein-Main
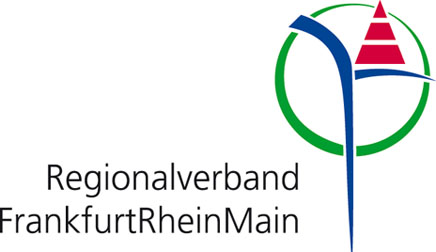

- Central Frankfurt
- Country: Germany
- State: Hesse
- Largest Cities: Frankfurt am Main, Offenbach am Main

Government
  - Type: Regionalverband Frankfurt Rhein-Main

Area
  - Metro: 2,458 km^{2} (949 sq mi)

Population
  - Metro: 2,295,588 (June 2,016)
  - Metro density: 928/km^{2} (2,400/sq mi)
- Time zone: UTC+1 (CET)
- Website: www.region-frankfurt.de

The Regional Authority of Frankfurt Rhein-Main is the cooperation body of the administratively fragmented Frankfurt am Main urban area and the common authority for Frankfurt am Main and its 75 neighboring communities. It manages and coordinates the regional development of Frankfurt am Main and its suburbs. It also represents the Frankfurt urban area nationally and internationally and is responsible for the strategic alignment of the local decision-making, for the development of a common regional image and an improved regional harmonisation. The authority draws up and updates the regional preparatory land use plans, local development and zoning plans, and carries out an intensive regional monitoring to coordinate the development of the urban region.

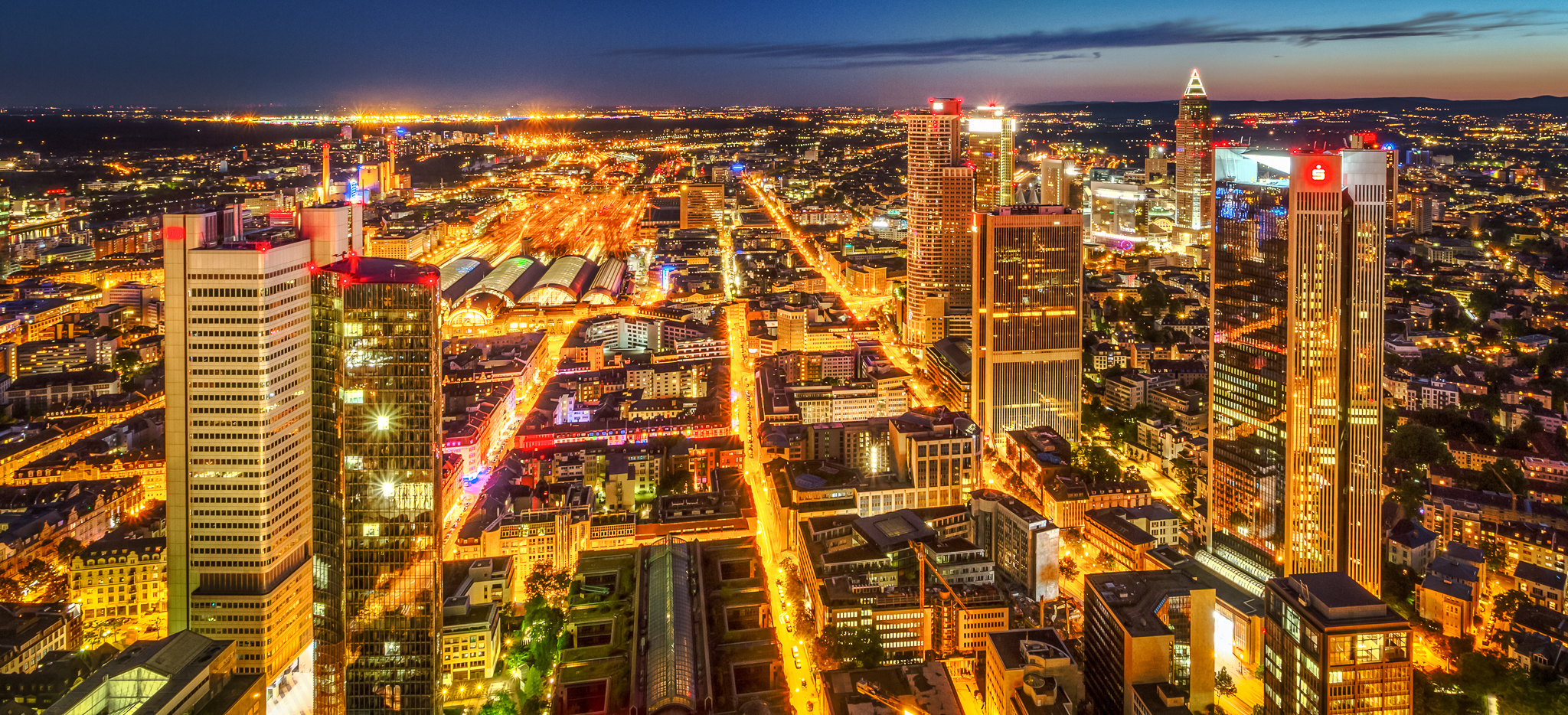
Frankfurt West

== History and structure ==
Since the last incorporation of suburbs into the city boundaries of Frankfurt in 1977, no local government boundary reform has been possible due to general rejection of such attempts by local politicians. Since Frankfurt and its neighbouring municipalities are de facto a highly integrated regional city, the government of the State of Hesse adopted a law in 2011, creating the Regional Authority FrankfurtRheinMain as a supra-local authority. Its purpose is to ensure coordinated actions and developments within the urban region as well as its representation on a national and international level.

== Finance industry ==
The Frankfurt am Main is one of the world's leading metropolitan regions in economic terms. It is the largest financial centre in continental Europe and ranks among the world's leading financial centres. It is home to the European Central Bank, Deutsche Bundesbank, Frankfurt Stock Exchange and other important commercial banks. Frankfurt is therefore considered a global city (alpha world city) as listed by the Loughborough University group's 2010 inventory. Among global cities it was ranked 10th by the Global Power City Index 2011 and 11th by the Global City Competitiveness Index 2012. Among financial centers it was ranked 8th by the International Financial Centers Development Index 2013 and 9th by the Global Financial Centres Index 2013.

== Traffic ==
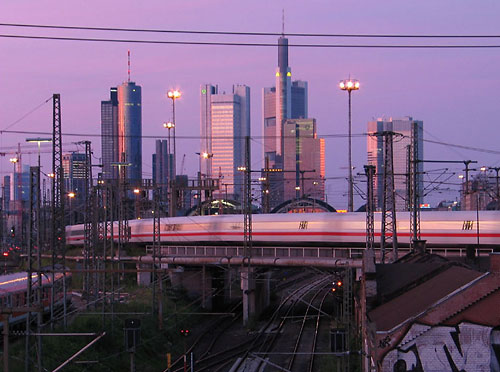
Frankfurt Hauptbahnhof

Due to its central location within Germany and Europe, Frankfurt is a major air, rail and highway transport hub. Frankfurt Airport is one of the world's busiest international airports by passenger traffic and the main hub for Germany's flag carrier Lufthansa, the largest airline in Europe. Frankfurt Central Station is one of the largest terminal stations in Europe and the busiest junction operated by Deutsche Bahn, the German national railway company, with 342 daily trains to domestic and European destinations. Frankfurter Kreuz, the Autobahn interchange close to the airport, is the most heavily used interchange in the EU with approximately 320,000 cars daily.

== Commerce ==
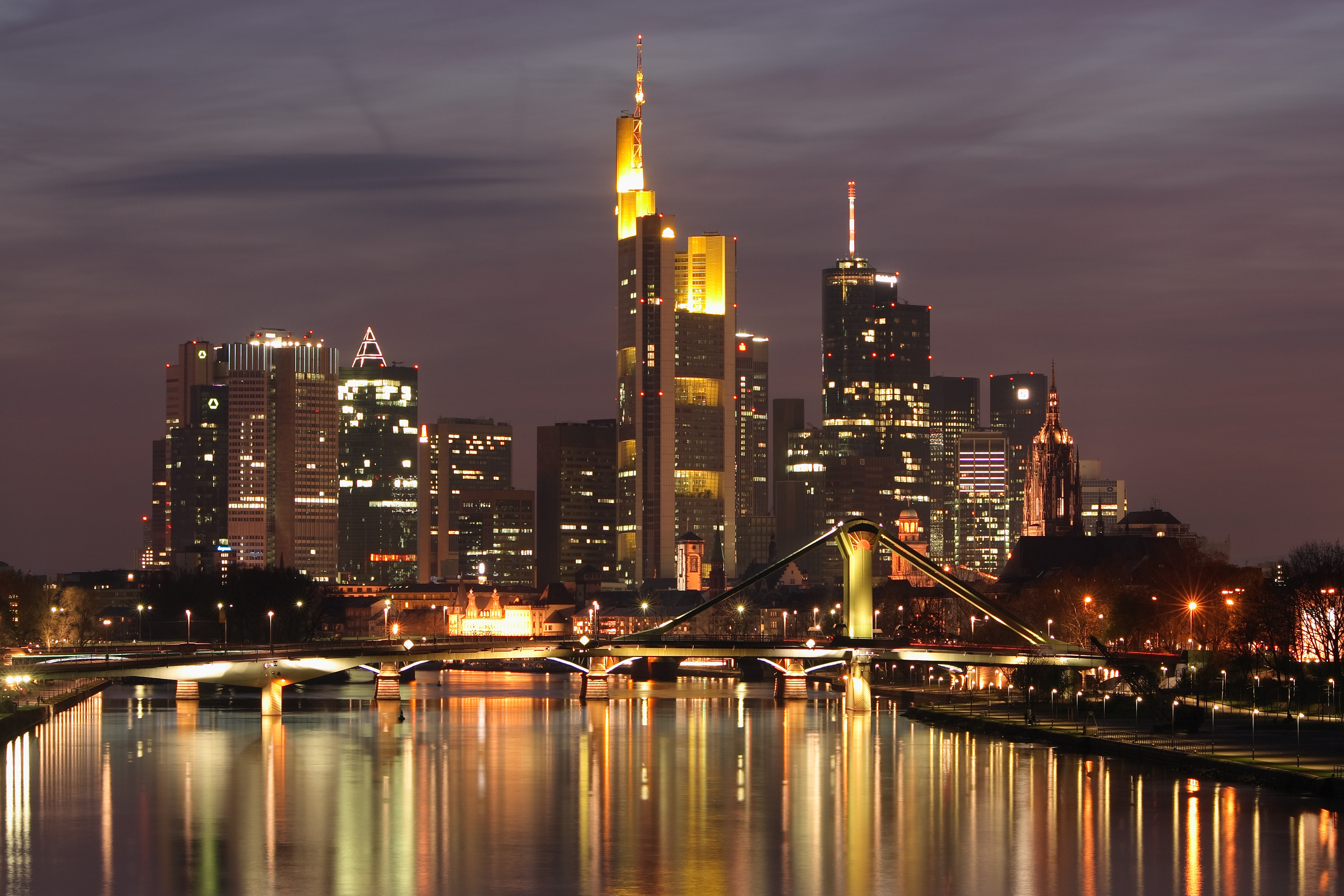
Skyline Frankfurt

Frankfurt is also a centre for commerce, culture, education, tourism and web traffic. Messe Frankfurt is one of the world's largest trade fairs at 578,000 square metres and ten exhibition halls, a central logistics centre and an attached convention centre. Major trade fairs include the Frankfurt Motor Show, the world's largest motor show, and the Frankfurt Book Fair, the world's largest book fair. Frankfurt is also home to many cultural and educational institutions including the Johann Wolfgang Goethe University and Frankfurt University of Applied Sciences, many museums (e.g. Städel, Naturmuseum Senckenberg, Schirn Kunsthalle Frankfurt, Goethe House), and two major botanical gardens, the Palmengarten, which is Germany's largest, and the Botanical Garden of the Goethe University. In 2011, the human-resource-consulting firm Mercer ranked Frankfurt as seventh in its annual "Quality of Living" survey of cities around the world. According to The Economist cost of living survey, Frankfurt is Germany's most expensive city, and the 10th most expensive in the world.

== Unique characteristics ==
A unique feature of Frankfurt is its skyline with a significant number of skyscrapers and high-rise buildings in the city centre. Frankfurt is one of only a few cities in the European Union that have such a skyline. Because of the city's skyline, Germans sometimes refer to Frankfurt as Mainhattan, a portmanteau of the local Main River and Manhattan. Before the city was devastated during World War II, the city was also globally noted for its unique old town with timberframe buildings. The Römer area was later rebuilt and is popular with visitors and for events such as Christmas markets. Parts of the old town were reconstructed at the Dom-Römer Project until 2016.

Among English-speakers, the city is commonly known simply as Frankfurt, but Germans occasionally call it by its full name when it is necessary to distinguish it from the other (significantly smaller) German city called Frankfurt in the federated state of Brandenburg, Frankfurt (Oder), on the Polish border. The common abbreviations for the city, which are primarily used in railway services and on road signs, are Frankfurt (Main), Frankfurt (M), Frankfurt a.M., Frankfurt/Main or Frankfurt/M. The common acronym for the city is "FFM". Also in use is "FRA", the IATA code for Frankfurt Airport.
