= 2010 in aviation =

This is a list of aviation-related events from 2010.

== Events ==
=== January ===
13 January

- German airline Blue Wings ceases operations.

19 January

- Japan Airlines files for protection from bankruptcy.

20 January

- British Prime Minister Gordon Brown announces that commercial flights between the United Kingdom and the Yemen would be suspended, owing to British concerns over terrorist activity in Yemen, and will not resume until the security situation in Yemen improves.

23 January

- United Eagle Airlines is renamed Chengdu Airlines.

24 January

- Taban Air Flight 6437, a Tupolev Tu-154M, crashes on landing at Mashhad International Airport in Iran. All 170 people on board escape from the burning aircraft.

25 January

- Ethiopian Airlines Flight 409, a Boeing 737-8AS, crashes into the Mediterranean shortly after take-off from Beirut Rafic Hariri International Airport in Beirut, Lebanon. All 90 people on board die.

26 January

- Spanish airline Quantum Air ceased operations.

31 January

- American carrier Northwest Airlines is merged into Delta Air Lines.

=== February ===
15 February

- Spanish airline Hola Airlines ceases operations.

18 February

- After setting fire to his house and leaving behind a suicide note expressing displeasure with government and taxation, Andrew Joseph Stack III crashes his Piper Dakota into an office building housing an Internal Revenue Service (IRS) field office in Austin, Texas, killing himself and an IRS manager and injuring 13 others, two of them seriously.

28 February

- Eurofly and Meridiana merge to form Meridiana Fly.

=== March ===
22 March

- Aviastar Flight 1906, a Tupolev Tu-204, crashes on approach to Domodedovo International Airport, Moscow. The aircraft is written off, the first hull loss for Aviastar and the first of a Tu-204.

25 March

- Scottish airline Highland Airways ceases operations.

31 March

- Canadian airline Skyservice ceases operations.
- Aloha Airlines ceases operations and declares bankruptcy. It halts all passenger operations and transfers all of its cargo operations to Aloha Air Cargo.

=== April ===
8 April

- British Airways and Iberia confirm that they have agreed to merge.

10 April

- A Polish Air Force Tupolev Tu-154M carrying the Polish President Lech Kaczyński and many other Polish officials crashes in poor visibility on approach to Smolensk North Airport in Smolensk, Russia, killing all 96 people on board.

12 April

- Air Jamaica ceases operations and its routes are taken over by Caribbean Airlines.

13 April

- Merpati Nusantara Airlines Flight 836, a Boeing 737-300, overruns the runway at Rendani Airport, Manokwari, Indonesia. All 103 passengers and crew escape alive.

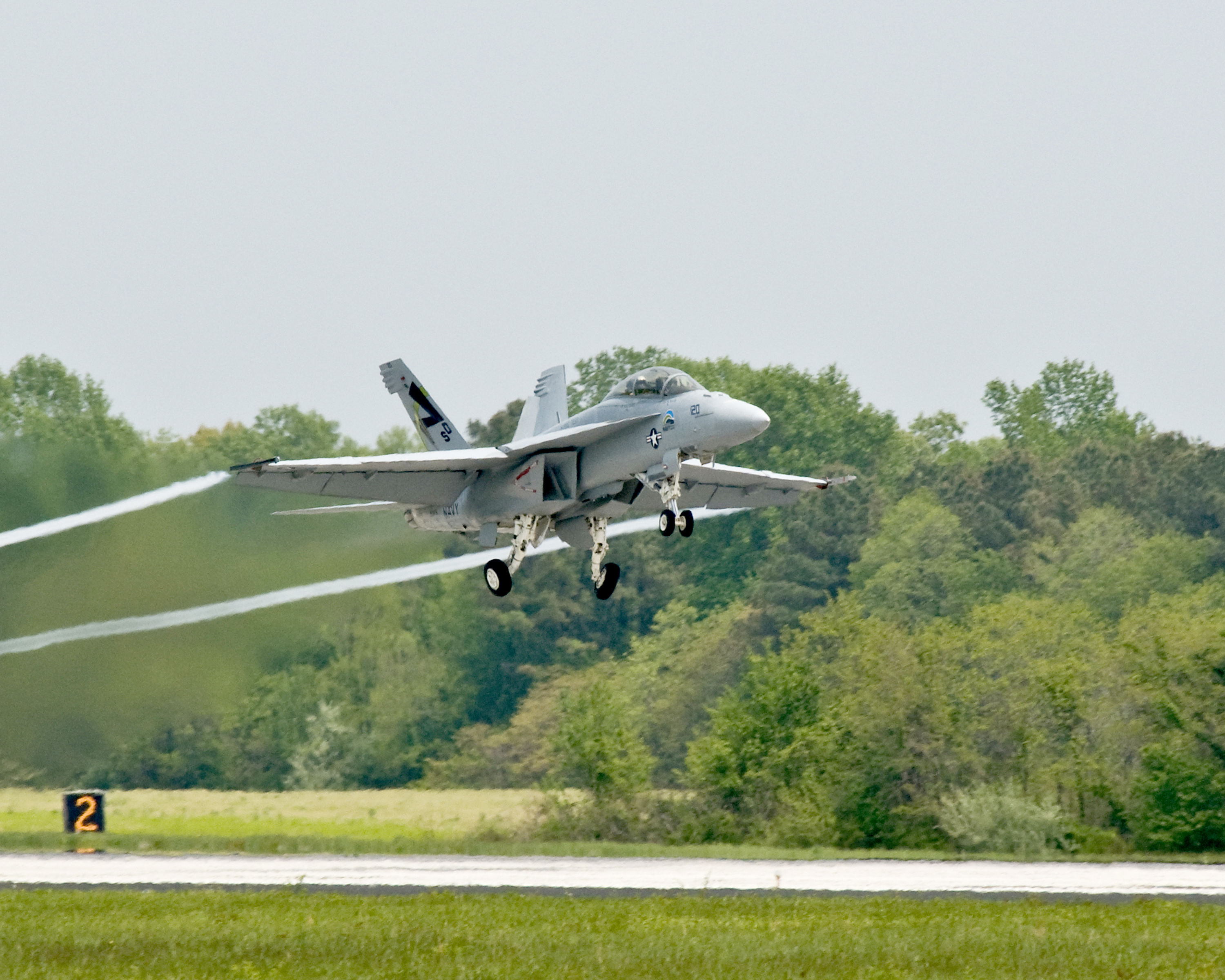
A United States Navy F/A-18 Super Hornet – the "Green Hornet" – making a biofuel-powered flight at Naval Air Station Patuxent River, Maryland, on 22 April 2010.

- Aerounion – Aerotransporte de Carga Union Flight 302, an Airbus A300B4F, crashes on approach to Monterrey International Airport, Monterrey, Mexico, killing all five crew and one person in a car struck by the aircraft.
- Cathay Pacific Flight 780 from Indonesia to Hong Kong has some trouble with its engines. They shut down and the pilots are able to turn one engine back on, however, they are unable to adjust the speed. The plane lands at nearly twice the normal landing speed and the brakes are put through its limits, turning orange-red.

15 April

- Following the second eruption of Eyjafjallajökull in Iceland, large areas of controlled airspace were closed, causing widespread suspension of services across Europe.

=== May ===
12 May

- Afriqiyah Airways Flight 771, an Airbus A330-202, crashes on approach to Tripoli International Airport, Libya, killing 103 people.

17 May

- Pamir Airways Flight 112, an Antonov An-24, crashes in the Salang Pass killing all 43 on board.

22 May

- Air India Express Flight 812, a Boeing 737-800, crashes at Mangalore International Airport with the loss of 158 lives.

26 May

- Iraqi Airways ceases operations.
- Launched from a B-52H Stratofortress over the Pacific Ocean, the Boeing X-51A Waverider makes a successful first flight, reaching nearly Mach 5. It is the first time in history that an aircraft flies powered by a practical thermally balanced hydrocarbon-fueled scramjet engine.

28 May

- The first Solar Impulse aircraft, HB-SIA, the first solar-powered aircraft capable of flying both day and night thanks to batteries charged by solar power that provide it with power during darkness, makes its first flight powered entirely by solar energy, charging its batteries in flight. The flight takes place at Payerne Airport outside Payerne, Switzerland.

=== June ===
- The European Union (EU) and the United States sign phase two of the EU–US Open Skies Agreement.

19 June

- Berlin Air Services Douglas DC-3 D-CXXX crashed shortly after take-off from Berlin Schönefeld Airport on a local sightseeing flight. Eight people were injured and the aircraft was substantially damaged.

21 June

- A Cameroon Aero Service CASA C-212 Aviocar crashes in the Republic of the Congo, killing all eleven people on board, including Australian mining magnate Ken Talbot.

=== July ===
8 July

- The first Solar Impulse aircraft, HB-SIA, the first solar-powered aircraft capable of both day and night flight thanks to its batteries charged by solar power, makes its first overnight flight, taking off from Payerne Airport outside Payerne, Switzerland, and returning after 26 hours 10 minutes 19 seconds in the air, the first overnight flight by a solar-powered aircraft and the longest flight in history up to this time by a crewed solar-powered aircraft. The flight also sets a record for the highest altitude ever attained by a crewed solar-powered aircraft, reaching 8,744 meters (28,688 feet) above ground and 9,235 meters (30,299 feet) in absolute altitude.

18 July

- The Boeing 787 Dreamliner makes its first international appearance at the Farnborough Airshow, UK.

27 July

- A Lufthansa Cargo McDonnell Douglas MD-11 crashes at King Khalid International Airport, Riyadh, Saudi Arabia.

28 July

- Airblue Flight 202, an Airbus A321, crashes in the Margalla Hills north of Islamabad, killing all 152 aboard in the deadliest air accident in Pakistan's history.
- Boeing C-17 Globemaster III 00-0173 of the United States Air Force crashed near Elmendorf Air Force Base killing all four people on board.

=== August ===
2 August

- The Mexican airline Mexicana files for insolvency proceedings in Mexico and bankruptcy protection in the United States.

3 August

- Katekavia Flight 9357, an Antonov An-24, crashes in Igarka, Russia, killing eleven people.

9 August

- A de Havilland Canada DHC-3T Turbo Otter crashes near Aleknagik, Alaska, killing five people aboard, including former United States Senator Ted Stevens. Former NASA Administrator and later EADS North America CEO Sean O'Keefe is among the four survivors.

13 August

- Spanish airline Andalus Lineas Aereas ceases operations.

16 August

- AIRES Flight 8250, a Boeing 737-73V, crashes short of the runway at Gustavo Rojas Pinilla International Airport, San Andrés, Colombia and breaks into three sections. One passenger dies from a heart attack following the accident. The other 124 passengers and six crew survive.

24 August

- Saudi airline SAMA ceases operations.
- Agni Air Flight 101, a Dornier 228, crashes near Shikharpur, Nepal killing all 14 people on board.
- Henan Airlines Flight 8387, an Embraer E190 LR, overruns the runway on landing at Lindu Airport, China, killing 44 of the 96 people on board.

25 August

- A Filair Let L-410 Turbolet crashes short of the runway at Bandundu Airport, killing 20 of the 21 people on board.

28 August

- The Mexican airline Mexicana de Aviacion suspends operations due to insolvency.

=== September ===
3 September

- UPS Airlines Flight 6, a Boeing 747-44AF, crashes shortly after take-off from Dubai International Airport, killing both crew and destroying the aircraft.

4 September

- A Fletcher FU-24 crashed on take-off from the Fox Glacier, killing all nine people on board.

7 September

- Alrosa Mirny Air Enterprise Flight 514, a Tupolev Tu-154M, has a total electrical failure in flight and makes an emergency landing at Izhma Airport, but overruns the runway. All 81 passengers and crew escaped uninjured. The aircraft involved was repaired in 2011.

13 September

- Conviasa Flight 2350, a ATR 42–400, crashes shortly after take-off from Manuel Carlos Piar Guayana Airport, Ciudad Guayana, Venezuela, killing 17 and injuring 23.

=== October ===
9 October

- Italian airline Livingston suspends flight operations. The Italian Civil Aviation Authority (ENAC) will revoke its air operator's certificate on 14 October.

12 October

- Transafrik International Flight 662, a Lockheed L-100 Hercules, crashes into a mountain 19 miles (31 km) east of Kabul International Airport, Afghanistan, killing all eight crew.

29 October

- A terrorist plot to send bombs by air freight from Yemen to the United States via the United Kingdom is uncovered.

=== November ===
4 November

- Qantas Flight 32, an Airbus A380, takes off from Singapore Changi Airport and sustains an uncontained engine failure over Batam Island, Indonesia. Falling debris injured one person on the ground. The aircraft returned to Singapore.
- Aero Caribbean Flight 883, an ATR 72, crashes at Guasimal, Cuba, killing all 68 people on board.

5 November

- A Jahangir Siddiqui Air Beechcraft 1900 crashes near Karachi, Pakistan, killing all 21 people on board.

28 November

- Sun Way Flight 4412, an Ilyushin Il-76, crashes in a populated area of Karachi, Pakistan, shortly after taking off from Jinnah International Airport, killing all eight persons on board and two on the ground.

29 November

- The shareholders of British Airways and Iberia approve the merger of the two airlines.

=== December ===
3 December

- South East Airlines Flight 372, a Tupolev Tu-154M, crashes on landing at Domodedovo International Airport, Moscow, Russia. Of the 168 people on board, two passengers were killed.

15 December

- A Tara Air de Havilland Canada DHC-6 Twin Otter crashes into a mountain shortly after departure from Lamidanda Airport, Nepal. The aircraft was operating a chartered passenger flight to Tribhuvan International Airport, Kathmandu, Nepal. All 19 passengers and crew were killed.
- Last operation by a Harrier jump jet in United Kingdom service, from RAF Cottesmore.

== First flights ==
- Grob G 120TP
- Wild DoubleEnder

=== January ===
26 January

- Kawasaki C-2 - 08-1201

29 January

- Sukhoi T-50

=== February ===
- Corvus Racer 540

8 February

- Boeing 747-8. - N747EX

=== March ===
10 March

- KAI KUH-1 Surion

18 March

- Avicopter AC313

29 March

- HAL Light Combat Helicopter

=== April ===
28 April

- Antonov An-158

=== July ===
8 July

- Boeing F-15SE Silent Eagle

=== September ===
10 September

- Eurocopter X3

=== November ===
- Shaanxi Y-9

=== December ===
30 December

- TAI Anka

== Retirements ==
=== September ===
17 September

- Boeing T-43

=== December ===
- General Dynamics F-111 by the Royal Australian Air Force, the last operator of the type.

== Deaths ==
19 July

- David Warren, Australian aviation scientist, inventor of the cockpit voice recorder (b. 1925)

== Deadliest crash ==
The deadliest crash of this year was Air India Express Flight 812, a Boeing 737 which crashed in a runway overrun at Mangalore, India on 22 May, killing 158 of the 166 people on board. The deadliest military aircraft crash of this year was the crash of a Polish Air Force Tu-154 in Smolensk, Russia on 10 April, killing all 96 on board.
