= 2010 Karachi plane crash =

2010 Karachi plane crash may refer to:

- JS Air Flight 201, killing 21 people on 5 November
- Sun Way Flight 4412, killing 12 people on 28 November
