= Islamabad International Airport =

Airport serving the Islamabad–Rawalpindi metropolitan area of Pakistan

Islamabad International Airport اسلام آباد بین الاقوامی ہوائی اڈا

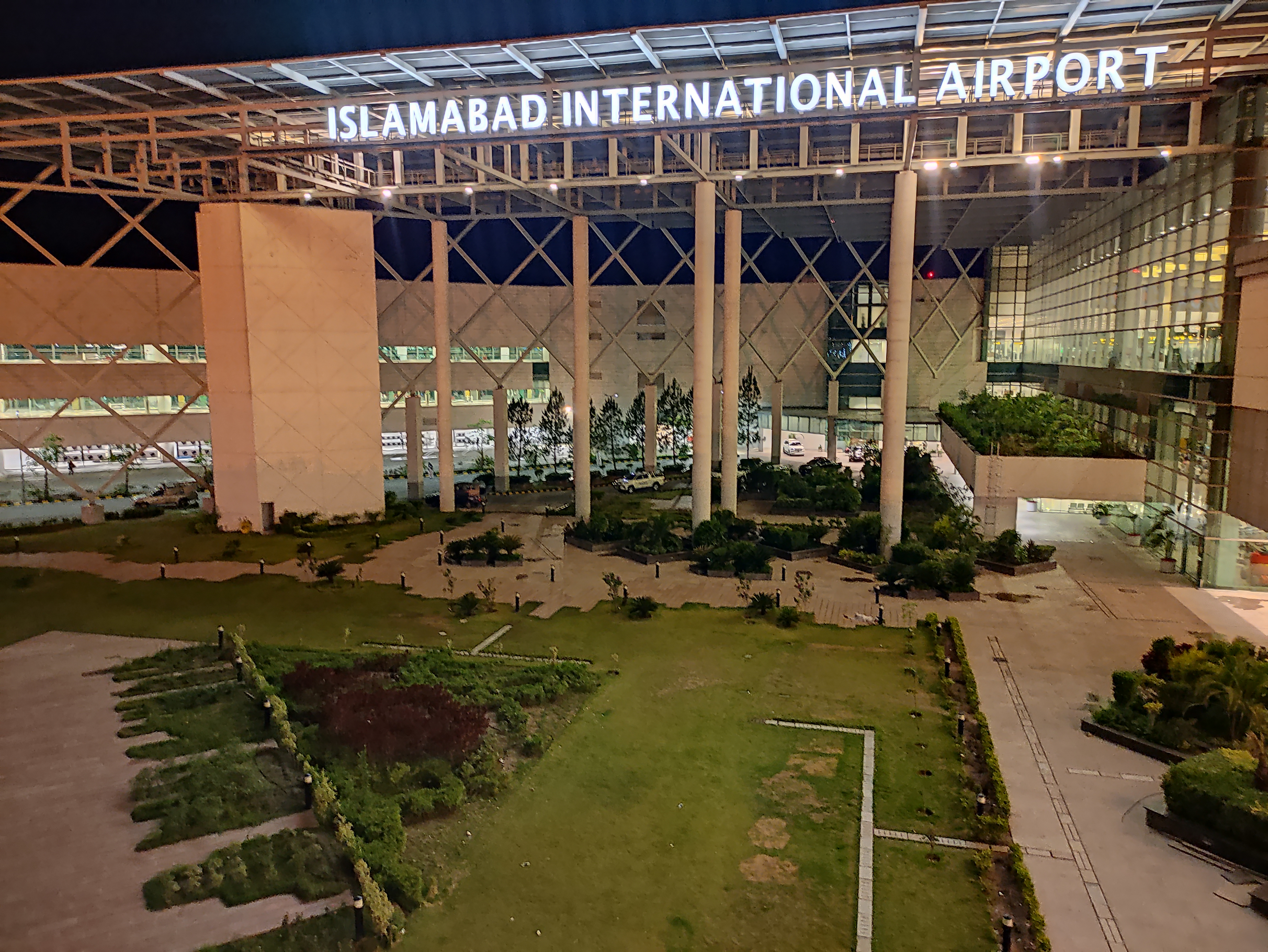
- IATA: ISB; ICAO: OPIS

Summary
- Airport type: Public
- Owner/Operator: Pakistan Civil Aviation Authority
- Serves: Islamabad-Rawalpindi region
- Location: Fateh Jang-45260, Punjab, Pakistan
- Opened: 1 May 2018; 8 years ago
- Hub for: Pakistan International Airlines SereneAir
- Elevation AMSL: 537 m (1,762 ft)
- Coordinates: 33°32′56.70″N 72°49′32.34″E
- Website: www.islamabadairport.com.pk
- Interactive map of Islamabad International Airport

Runways
Direction	Length		Surface
Direction	m	ft	Surface
10R/28L	3,657.6	12,000	Asphalt
10L/28R	3,657.6	12,000	Asphalt

Statistics (July 2024 – June 2025)
- Passengers: 6,804,439 ▲10.22%
- Aircraft movements: 36,023 ▲1.58%
- Cargo handled: 70,455 metric tons ▲10.96%
- Source: Statistics from the Pakistan Civil Aviation Authority

Islamabad International Airport (Urdu: اسلام آباد بین الاقوامی ہوائی اڈا) (IATA: ISB, ICAO: OPIS) is an international airport serving Islamabad, the capital city of Pakistan, and Rawalpindi. It is located 25 km (16 mi) south-west of Islamabad, and is directly connected to the Lahore and Peshawar motorways as well to the capital city Islamabad via Srinagar Highway.

The airport commenced full operations on 6 May 2018, replacing the Benazir Bhutto International Airport. It is the largest airport in Pakistan in terms of cargo, area and passenger capacity, capable of serving 9 million passengers annually. Further expansions in the future will allow it to serve up to 25 million passengers annually. It became the busiest airport in Pakistan in terms of total passenger traffic in the fiscal year 2024-2025, surpassing Jinnah International Airport, Karachi. The terminal includes 15 gates with ten remote gates, duty-free shops, a food court and 42 immigration counters. Pakistan Civil Aviation Authority is acquiring 1,146 hectares (2,830 acres) of land to build a third runway. It is the first airport in Pakistan that has double airbridges capable of handling the Airbus A380. New Gwadar International is the second, followed by Jinnah International Airport, which will be able to accommodate the A380 after its main runway reconstruction, and followed by Allama Iqbal International Airport where the main runway can handle an A380. The airport is a hub for Pakistan International Airlines and SereneAir.

== History ==
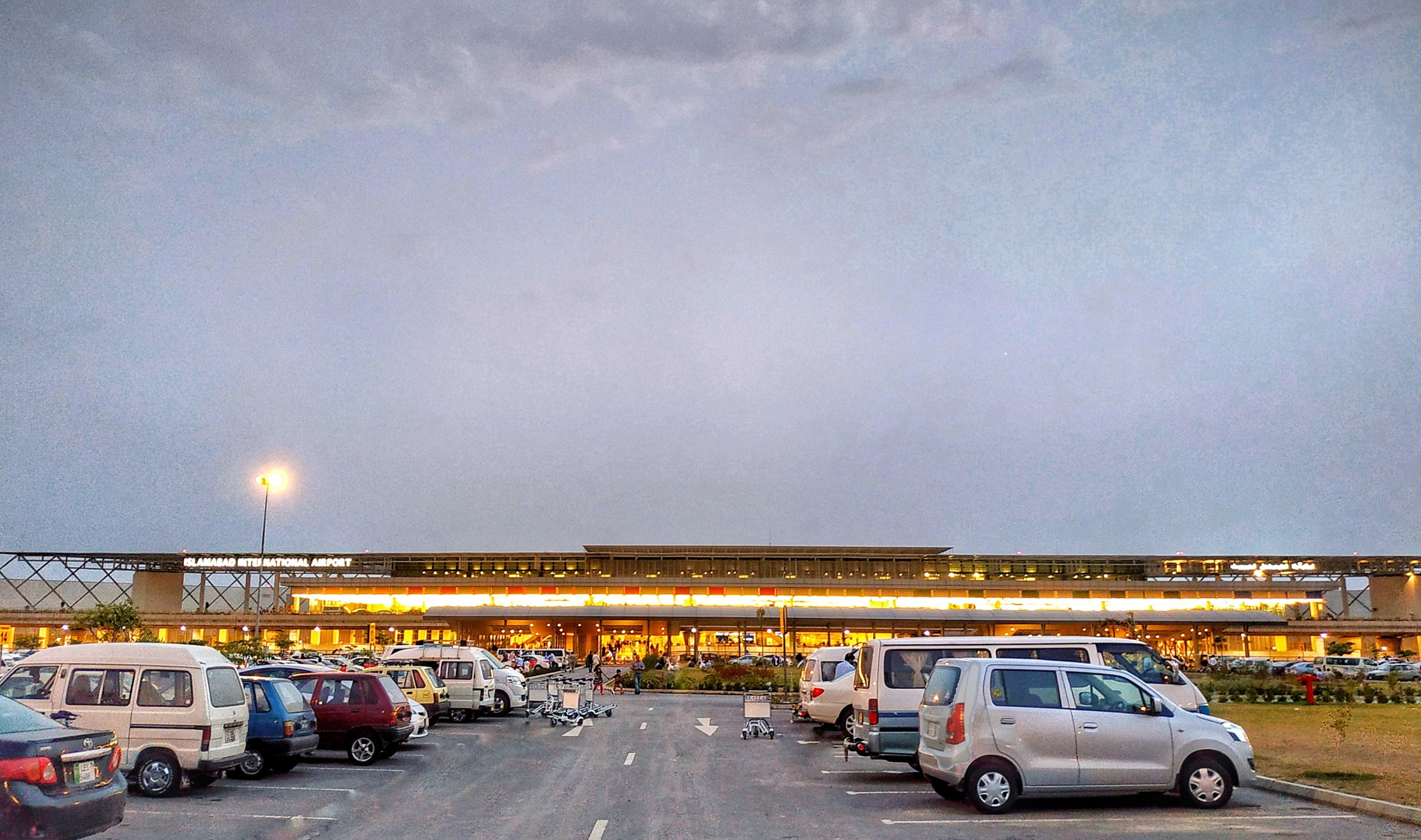
Islamabad International Airport view from Parking Area

=== Development ===
Construction of the Islamabad International Airport (ICAO: OPIS) began on 7 April 2007. It was formally inaugurated on 20 April 2018 for regular international and domestic flights.

The plan to construct a new airport was announced in January 2005 by the Pakistan Civil Aviation Authority. A land of 1,312 hectares (3,242 acres) land was acquired at the cost of Rs. 2.5 billion in November 2005.

The new airport was planned in response to increasing air traffic and passenger loads at the existing Benazir Bhutto International Airport. It was estimated that the number of passengers at the former airport was growing by 14 percent annually compared to the national air passenger growth rate of 4 percent, making it the second-busiest airport in the country at the time. Therefore, a site in Pind Ranjha, Attock District was selected as the site for the construction of a new airport just a few kilometres from the Islamabad interchange on M-1/M-2 motorways. The foundation stone of the project was laid by former President Pervez Musharraf and Prime Minister Shaukat Aziz on 7 April 2007.

It was a project of the Pakistan Civil Aviation Authority (PCAA) and designed by French company Aéroports de Paris Ingenierie (ADPi) and CPG Corporation of Singapore. The whole project was financed by PCAA on its own. It is built on more than 1,295 ha (3,200 acres) of land and consists of a passenger terminal building, two runways, four taxiways, and apron and parking bays for wide-body aircraft. There is also a cargo terminal, air traffic control complex, and fuel farm, as well as a fire, crash, and rescue facility. The site of the airport is near Fateh Jang Tehsil of Attock District. It is 25 km (16 mi) equidistant from Zero Point, Islamabad and from Saddar, Rawalpindi. The airport is on par with international standards, and serves as a major hub for all aviation activities in Pakistan. The PCAA asked a team of British architects to design the new airport. PCAA signed an agreement with the Louis Berger Group in the US in association with Pakistani consulting firm GT AASR, to undertake project management services. The airport was to be completed in five years but took 12 years to complete, resulting in a three times increase in cost. MM Pakistan (MMP) and Mott Macdonald Ltd. were tasked to undertake the project management services from the previous consultants, and were successful in completing this troubled project.

=== Operations ===
On 7 April 2018, Pakistan International Airlines (PIA) successfully conducted the inaugural test flight from Benazir Bhutto International Airport to Islamabad International Airport, piloted by Captain Masood Bijrani and First Officer Hamad Khan. The aircraft landed at the New Islamabad International Airport to assess the facility's operational readiness, including airport systems, passenger handling by PIA staff and crew, as well as coordination with customs, the Airport Security Force, and other relevant agencies.

On 1 May 2018, Prime Minister Shahid Khaqan Abbasi officially inaugurated the new airport. This was followed up with the airport commencing full commercial flight operations on 3 May 2018 and thus replacing the old airport.

On 8 July 2018, the first Airbus A380 landed in Islamabad, arriving as one-off Emirates flight EK-2524 from Dubai International Airport. This was the first time an Airbus A380 flight landed in Pakistan.

Virgin Atlantic flew their first flight to Islamabad on 10 December 2020 with Boeing 787 Dreamliner aircraft. Virgin Atlantic ended their service to Islamabad on 9 July 2023.

As of 2023, Pakistan International Airlines has moved its international hub from Karachi's Jinnah International Airport to Islamabad International Airport, better reflecting the origin of its international passengers.

== Controversies ==
=== Outsourcing management and operations ===
On 31 December 2022, the Government of Pakistan announced its decision to outsource the management of Islamabad International Airport to international operators as part of an initiative to encourage foreign investment. The Islamabad airport, along with other major airports, is slated to be managed under a public-private partnership (PPP) model. This move aims to boost government revenue and enhance facilities, offering improved services for international travellers. In October 2024, the government's 15-year lease award for Islamabad International Airport has sparked controversy, with allegations of favouritism after one bidder was reportedly barred from participating.

== Facilities ==
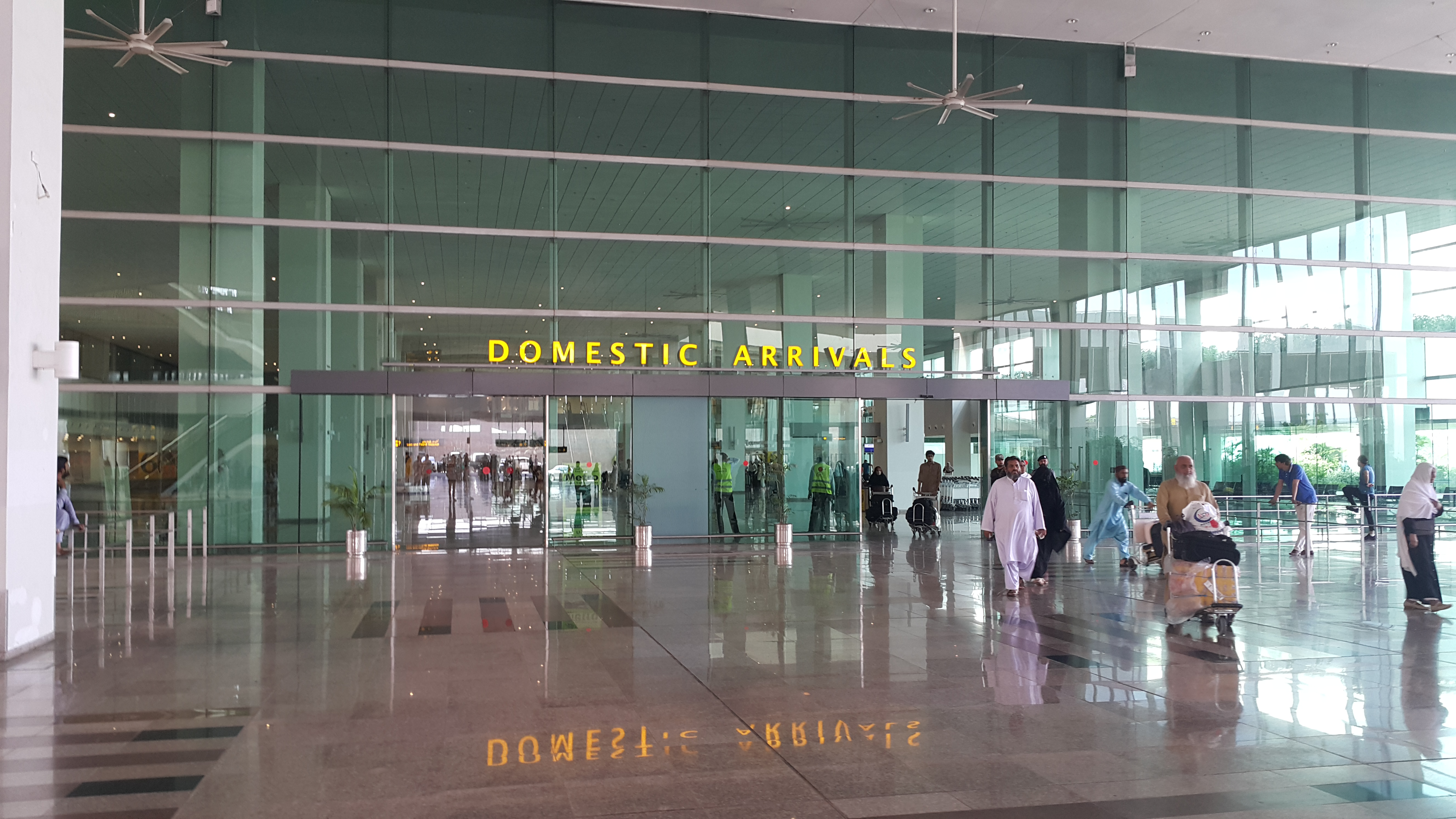
Domestic Arrivals

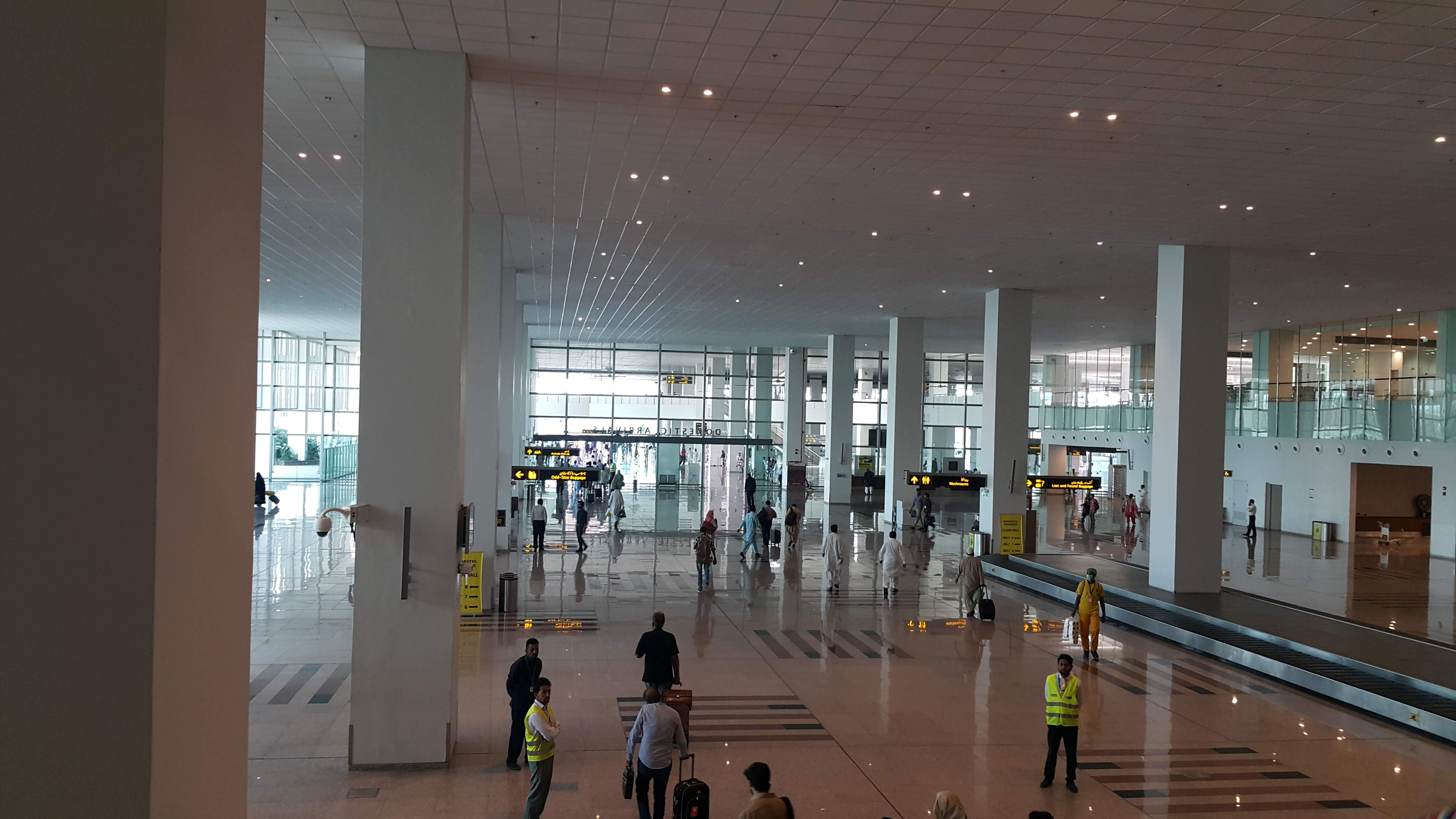
Interior of domestic arrivals

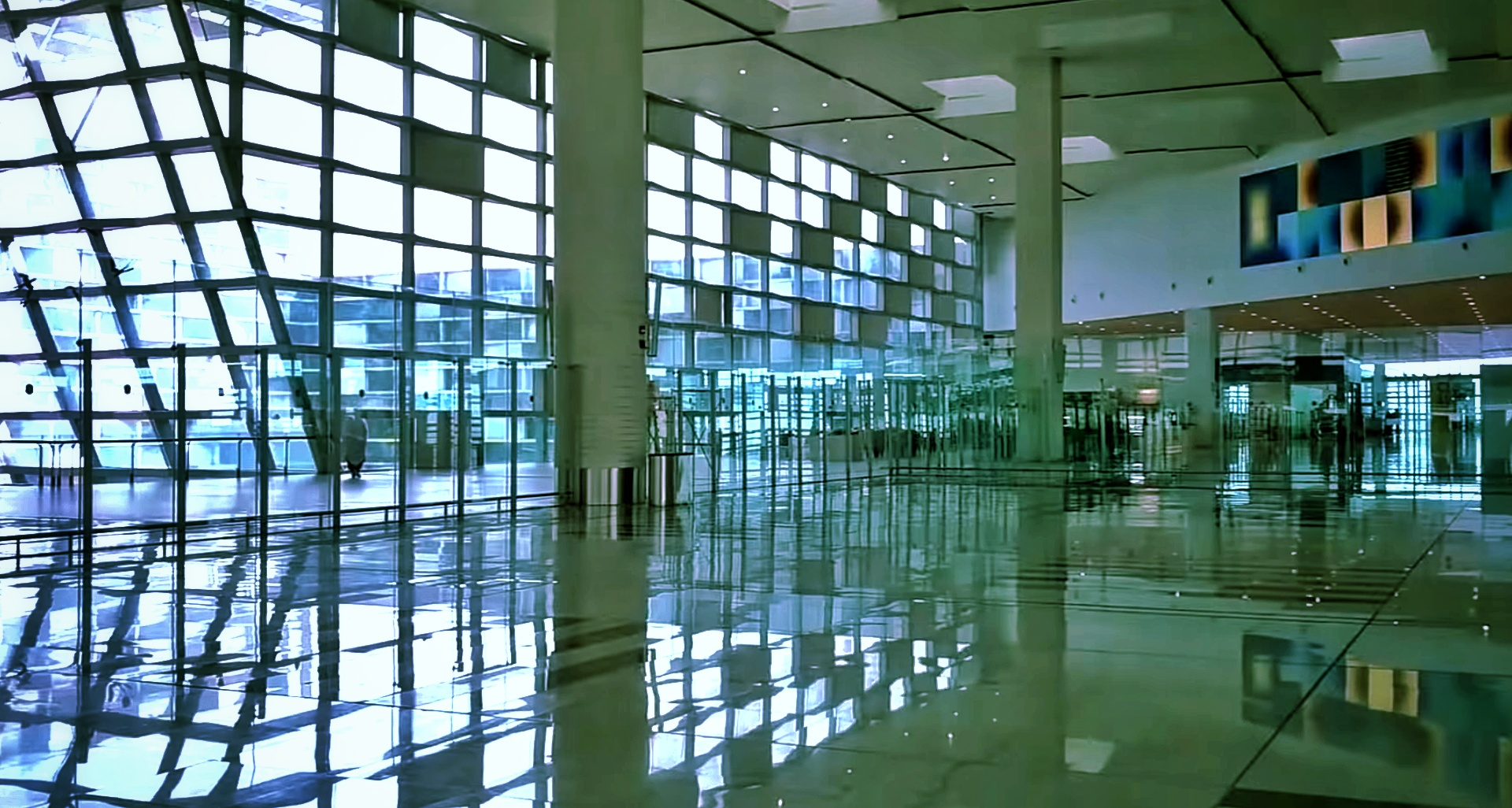
International departure area

Islamabad International Airport has a 180,000 m^{2} (1,900,000 sq ft) modular terminal building which is capable of handling 9 million passengers and 80,000 metric tons of cargo per annum. The numbers are expected to reach 25 million passengers by 2024. Being a new airport, a significant portion of the land has been earmarked for commercial purposes such as duty-free shops, a hotel and convention centre, air malls, a business centre, food courts, and leisure and cinema facilities.

== Airlines and destinations ==
=== Passenger ===
The following airlines operate regular scheduled and charter flights at Islamabad International Airport:

Airlines	Destinations
Aero Nomad Airlines	Bishkek
Air Arabia	Ras Al Khaimah
Ariana Afghan Airlines	Kabul
Air China	Beijing–Capital^{1}
Airblue	Abu Dhabi, Dammam, Dubai–International, Jeddah, Karachi, Quetta, Riyadh, Sharjah
AirSial	Abu Dhabi, Dammam, Dubai–International, Jeddah, Karachi, Muscat, Riyadh
Azerbaijan Airlines	Baku
British Airways	London–Gatwick
China Southern Airlines	Guangzhou, Kashgar, Ürümqi
Emirates	Dubai–International
Etihad Airways	Abu Dhabi
Fly Jinnah	Al Ain (Begins 4 December 2026), Abu Dhabi (begins 28 November 2026), Bahrain, Dammam, Lahore, Jeddah, Karachi, Quetta, Riyadh, Sharjah
Flyadeal	Riyadh
Flydubai	Dubai–International
Flynas	Riyadh
Gulf Air	Bahrain
Iran Airtour	Tehran–Imam Khomeini
Iraqi Airways	Baghdad, Najaf
Jazeera Airways	Kuwait City
Kam Air	Kabul
Kuwait Airways	Kuwait City
Mahan Air	Tehran–Imam Khomeini
Pakistan International Airlines	Abu Dhabi, Al Ain, Baku, Birmingham (resumes 1 December 2026), Beijing–Capital, Chitral, Dammam, Doha, Dubai–International, Gassim, Gilgit, Istanbul, Jeddah, Karachi, Kuala Lumpur–International, London–Heathrow, Manchester, Medina, Muscat, Paris–Charles de Gaulle, Quetta, Riyadh, Skardu, Sukkur, Toronto–Pearson
Qatar Airways	Doha
Riyadh Air	Riyadh
SalamAir	Muscat
Saudia	Jeddah, Riyadh
Somon Air	Dushanbe
South Air	Bahawalpur, Karachi, Multan
Thai Airways International	Bangkok–Suvarnabhumi
Turkish Airlines	Istanbul
Uzbekistan Airways	Tashkent

^{1}: Air China uses Islamabad as a stopover for its flights to Karachi. However, Air China has no rights to transport passengers between Islamabad and Karachi.

=== Cargo ===
Airline	Destinations
SF Airlines	Urumqi
TCS Courier	Karachi, Lahore

== Ground transport ==
=== Road ===
The airport is connected to Islamabad via the Srinagar Highway and Rawalpindi via the GT Road (Highway N-5). A four-lane highway was constructed to serve cargo traffic. The Srinagar Highway is also connected to M-1 Motorway, providing another connection to the airport from Peshawar, Chiamkiani, Nowshera, Risalpur, Jehangira, Lawrencepur, Burhan Attock and Fateh Jang.

=== Public transportation ===
A metrobus rapid transit service, which commenced operations on 18 April 2022, connects the airport with Islamabad and Rawalpindi.

== Accidents and Incidents ==
- On April 16, 2023, Qatar Airways Flight 614, operated by an Airbus A350-900, had a tailstrike while landing on the airport’s Runway 28L. Footage from a passenger of the flight predicted that the tailstrike was due to high winds as it was a crosswind landing. The flight crew executed a go around immediately and landed safely on Runway 28L 15 minutes later.

== See also ==
- List of airports in Pakistan
- List of the busiest airports in Pakistan
- List of airlines of Pakistan
- Shaheen Airport Services
- Transport in Pakistan

== Bibliography ==
- Ground breaking ceremony of new Islamabad airport likely in April Archived 9 August 2020 at the Wayback Machine, Business Recorder (Pakistan's Financial Daily Newspaper), 2005-03-03.
- CAA initiates $300m new Islamabad airport (NIIA), Pakistan Link Headline News, 2006-01-07.
- CAA initiates $300m new Islamabad airport project, The News Business Section, 2006-01-07.
- New Islamabad International Airport ready for ground breaking Ceremony Archived 30 September 2024 at the Wayback Machine, PakTribune, 2006-02-07.
- The ground laying ceremony at Fateh Jang, Attock 2007 video at YouTube
- Launched: Islamabad joins league of top airports
