= Flight 201 =

Flight 201 may refer to:

- South African Airways Flight 201, crashed on 8 April 1954
- Imperial Airlines Flight 201/8, crashed on 8 November 1961
- Copa Airlines Flight 201, crashed on 6 June 1992
- JS Air Flight 201, crashed on 5 November 2010
