= 1947 Korangi Creek crash =

1947 aviation accident

Coordinates: 24.791435°N 67.116036°E

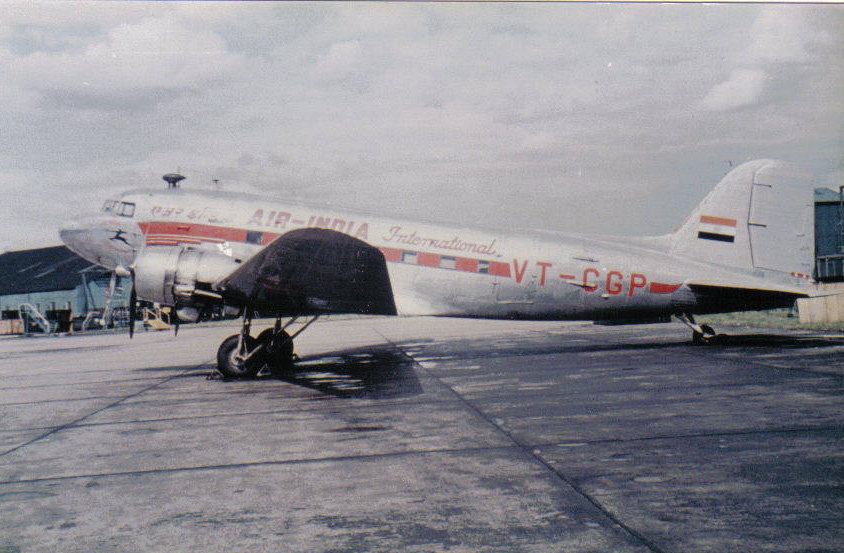
- An Air India DC-3, similar to the one involved in the accident

Accident
- Date: 27 December 1947
- Summary: Loss of control due to instrument failure during night conditions
- Site: Korangi Creek, Pakistan

Aircraft
- Aircraft type: Douglas C-48C
- Operator: Air India
- Registration: VT-AUG
- Flight origin: Karachi International Airport, Pakistan
- Destination: Santacruz Airport, India
- Occupants: 23
- Passengers: 19
- Crew: 4
- Fatalities: 23
- Survivors: 0

The Korangi Creek crash took place on 27 December 1947 when an Air India flight from Karachi to Bombay crashed shortly after takeoff. All 19 passengers and 4 crew members were killed. Poor visibility and malfunctioning instruments in the cockpit led the pilots to lose control. The Douglas C-48 aircraft was damaged beyond repair.

This was the first airline fatality in Pakistan after its independence in 1947. As of 2022, it is the 15th worst aircraft accident in the country.

== Aircraft ==
The Douglas C-48 involved was built in 1941 as a civilian Douglas DC-3A-314 with construction number 4175 and registered NC30006 and operated for Pan Am. In 1942 the aircraft was converted to a C-48C with tail number 42-38336 for the USAAF. After WWII, the aircraft was declared surplus and phased out and was subsequently sold to Air India and registered VT-AUG.

== Events ==
The aircraft was on an international scheduled flight from Karachi to Bombay, carrying 19 passengers and 4 crew members. The pilot had called the mechanic to the cockpit just before takeoff to inspect an instrument light failure. The problem was fixed after the fuses were replaced, however, the mechanic was recalled as only one of the landing lights was operational. The captain decided to conduct this flight using only this light. He also remarked that he could smell something burning.

Ten minutes after takeoff, the aircraft was observed to be losing altitude over Korangi Creek Cantonment, and crashed with engines under power. It hit the ground at an angle of 30° whilst in a violent side slip to starboard. All 23 occupants were killed.
