= Ispahani Hangar =

Pakistan International Airlines

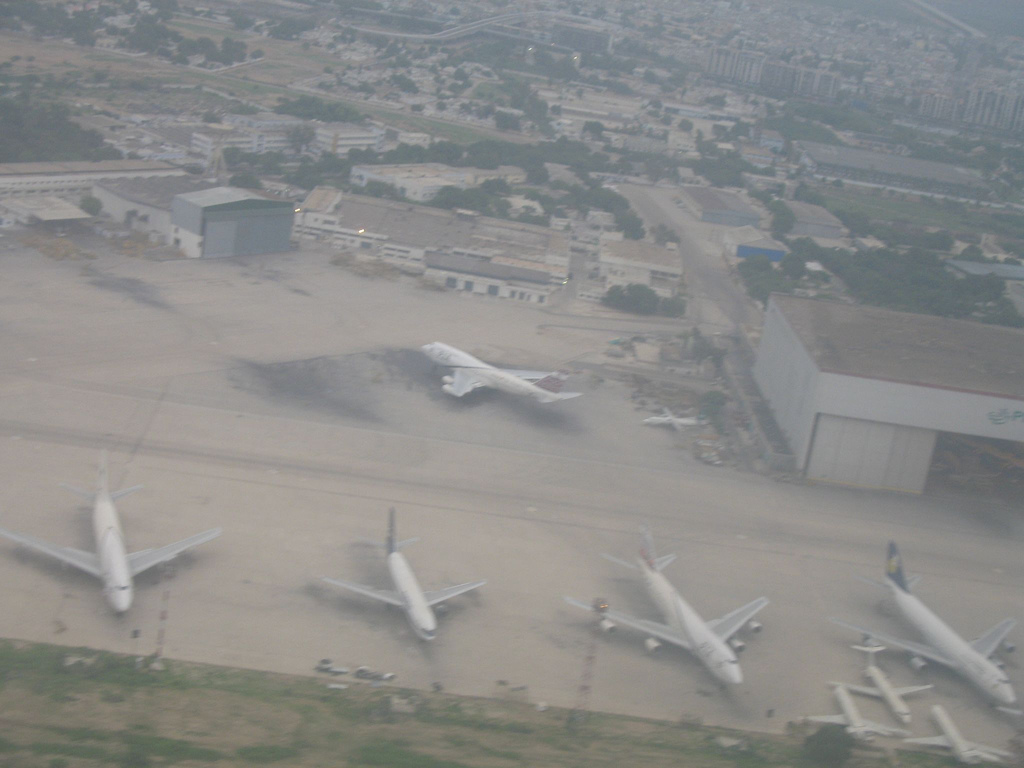
Ispahani Hangar seen from aircraft during take off

The Ispahani Hangar is a Pakistan International Airlines wide-body aircraft maintenance hangar at the Jinnah International Airport in Karachi, Pakistan. It was named in honour of Mirza Ahmad Ispahani, the first and longest-serving chairman of Pakistan International Airlines (PIA). The hangar for wide body and narrow-body aircraft with a supporting airframe overhaul shop was completed and commissioned in 1980.

The hangars in Karachi are used for checks and maintenance of aircraft operated by PIA and by other airlines such as Philippine Airlines, Iran Air. and Turkish Airlines.

== See also ==
- List of airports in Pakistan
- Airlines of Pakistan
- Pakistan Civil Aviation Authority
- Shaheen Airport Services
- Transport in Pakistan
- Pakistan International Airlines
