= List of the busiest airports in Pakistan =

The following table provides details of the busiest airports in Pakistan in terms of total passenger numbers, including both international and domestic passengers, from the fiscal year July 2015 - June 2016 to the fiscal year July 2024 - June 2025. The table is presented in chronological order, starting from the latest ended fiscal year. The number of total passengers for an airport is measured in persons and includes any passenger that arrives at, departs from or is on a transit from that airport. The results were collected by the Pakistan Civil Aviation Authority.

== Statistics ==
Rank (2024/2025)	Airport	City	IATA Code	Total Passengers 2024/2025	Total Passengers 2023/2024	Total Passengers 2022/2023	Total Passengers 2021/2022	Total Passengers 2020/2021	Total Passengers 2019/2020	Total Passengers 2018/2019	Total Passengers 2017/2018	Total Passengers 2016/2017	Total Passengers 2015/2016
1	Islamabad International Airport	Islamabad-Rawalpindi	ISB	6,804,439	6,173,421	5,675,271	4,751,451	3,271,167	4,027,918	5,427,610	813,103*	N/A	N/A
2	Jinnah International Airport	Karachi	KHI	6,711,131	6,460,547	5,883,291	5,165,904	3,366,509	4,381,949	6,802,121	7,267,026	6,913,479	6,614,461
3	Allama Iqbal International Airport	Lahore	LHE	6,048,541	5,420,213	5,104,710	3,695,960	2,338,963	3,445,084	4,723,395	5,055,232	5,019,840	4,907,432
4	Multan International Airport	Multan	MUX	1,386,973	1,452,176	1,225,334	765,635	432,107	842,957	1,182,925	1,348,065	1,198,767	935,312
5	Bacha Khan International Airport	Peshawar	PEW	1,161,063	1,269,120	1,341,577	1,066,513	640,536	1,059,828	1,403,617	1,580,234	1,602,158	1,449,927
6	Sialkot International Airport	Sialkot	SKT	939,899	1,044,747	871,136	680,489	303,744	653,677	841,477	908,407	871,714	718,128
7	Quetta International Airport	Quetta	UET	535,065	426,903	359,192	360,275	304,280	359,150	444,610	441,020	411,518	405,829
8	Faisalabad International Airport	Faisalabad	LYP	417,203	426,905	427,584	295,141	131,356	350,258	526,459	555,938	499,443	309,705
9	Skardu International Airport	Skardu	KDU	179,454	146,449	104,735	127,124	86,187	50,196	49,180	60,871	59,271	43,377
10	Gilgit Airport	Gilgit	GIL	31,230	35,550	40,905	64,767	47,554	43,942	45,137	38,179	43,696	42,629
11	Sukkur Airport	Sukkur	SKZ	23,662	28,041	36,742	38,918	19,872	70,330	93,592	114,081	107,575	102,122
12	Turbat Airport	Turbat	TUK	9,687	12,220	22,958	34,858	16,925	33,192	44,627	54,534	50,191	51,871
13	Gwadar International Airport	Gwadar	GWD	8,991	7,045	12,795	16,343	10,672	17,941	26,078	33,984	29,048	19,253
14	Mai Bakhtawar International Airport	Islamkot	ZZ1	3,212	2,891	2,405	N/A	N/A	N/A	258	117	N/A	N/A
15	Sui Airport	Sui	SUL	2,053	2,092	1,004	2,425	1,907	2,155	282	N/A	326	N/A
16	Juzzak Airstrip	Juzzak	JZK	1,934	2,462	1,104	553	N/A	N/A	N/A	N/A	N/A	N/A
17	Chitral Airport	Chitral	CJL	364	376	651	3,337	2,157	1,674	5,498	8,467	14,097	10,129
18	Zamzama Airstrip	Dadu	ZIZ	34	N/A	N/A	N/A	N/A	N/A	N/A	194	948	2,483
19	Sheikh Zayed International Airport	Rahim Yar Khan	RYK	0	2,004	7,204	5,617	1,748	36,299	53,970	87,341	96,152	86,483
20	Bahawalpur Airport	Bahawalpur	BHV	0	1,568	5,993	5,479	646	13,611	23,882	34,492	31,184	36,745

*NOTE: Islamabad International Airport opened in 2018 and replaced Benazir Bhutto International Airport, which served as the primary international airport of Islamabad from 1930 to 2018. Hence, statistics for Islamabad International Airport before 2018 are not available.

== See also ==
- List of airports in Pakistan
