= Pind Ranjha =

- Village
- Location in Pakistan
- Country: Pakistan
- Province: Punjab
- District: Sargodha

Pind Ranjha is a small village located in Sargodha District of Punjab, Pakistan. It is located 30 kilometers from Kot Momin M2 motorway interchange.
