= Jinnah International Airport =

Main airport of Karachi, Pakistan

Jinnah International Airport جناح بین الاقوامی ہوائی اڈہ

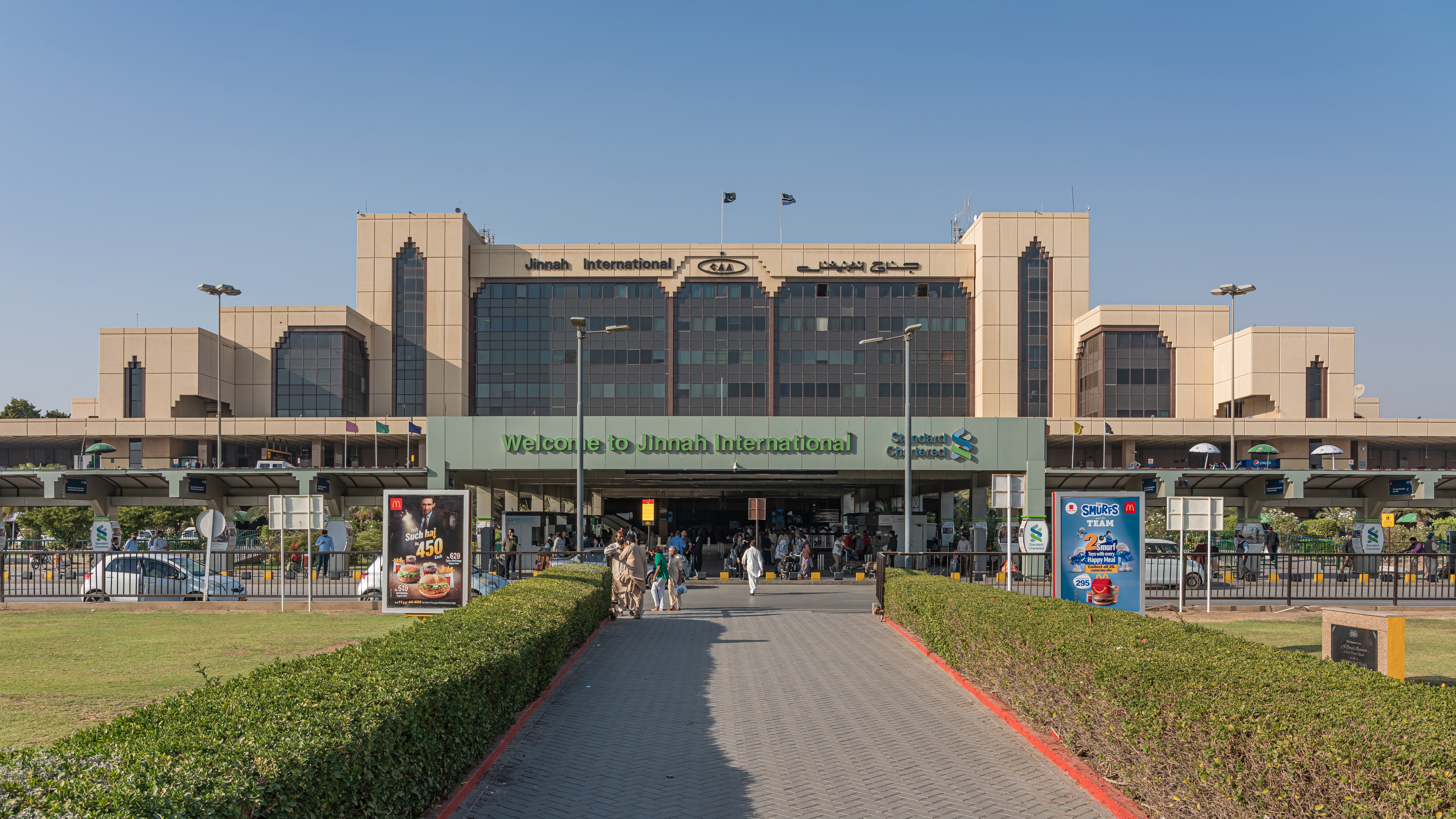
- IATA: KHI; ICAO: OPKC

Summary
- Airport type: Public
- Owner: Government of Pakistan
- Operator: Pakistan Airports Authority
- Serves: Karachi
- Location: Karachi-75200, Sindh, Pakistan
- Opened: 30 March 1929; 97 years ago
- Hub for: Pakistan International Airlines; airblue; Fly Jinnah; SereneAir; AirSial
- Built: 5 December 1938; 87 years ago
- Elevation AMSL: 30 m (98 ft)
- Coordinates: 24°54′24″N 67°09′39″E
- Website: www.karachiairport.com.pk
- Interactive map of Jinnah International Airport

Runways
| Direction | Length | | Surface |
| Direction | m | ft | Surface |
|---|---|---|---|
| 07R/25L | 3,400 | 11,155 | Concrete |
| 07L/25R | 3,200 | 10,500 | Concrete |

Statistics (July 2024 – June 2025)
- Passengers: 6,711,131 ▲3.87%
- Aircraft movements: 45,322 ▲8.54%
- Cargo handled: 104,273 metric tons ▼0.68%
- Source: Statistics from the Pakistan Civil Aviation Authority

Jinnah International Airport (Urdu: جناح بین الاقوامی ہوائی اڈا) (IATA: KHI, ICAO: OPKC), formerly Drigh Road Airport or Karachi International Airport, is the international airport serving Karachi, the largest city and commercial capital of Pakistan. It is Pakistan's second busiest airport in terms of total passengers, after Islamabad International Airport. It is named after Muhammad Ali Jinnah, the statesman and founder of Pakistan.

The airport is managed by the Pakistan Civil Aviation Authority (PCAA) and serves as a hub for the national flag carrier, Pakistan International Airlines (PIA), airblue, and many other private airlines. The airport is equipped with aircraft engineering and overhauling facilities including the Ispahani Hangar for wide-body aircraft.

== History ==
It is unclear when Karachi Airport was first used by civil aircraft, as it is often confused with RAF Drigh Road, but a location northeast of the RAF station was identified on a 1928 map of Karachi as a landing site for Imperial Airways.

Imperial Airways was one of the first airlines to fly to Karachi, on 30 March 1929, when the territory was part of British India.

J. R. D. Tata made the inaugural airmail flight from Juhu Aerodrome in Bombay (now Mumbai) to Drigh Road airstrip (now Jinnah International Airport), Karachi, via Ahmedabad, on 15 October 1932, carrying mail in a Puss Moth aircraft.

During the late 1920s and early 1930s, a large airship hangar was constructed at the site of Karachi Airport for the British HMA R101. Only three such hangars were built worldwide to accommodate Britain's fleet of passenger airships. The R101 never arrived in Karachi, as it crashed and exploded eight hours into its maiden flight over Beauvais, France, killing all but six of its 54 passengers and crew. The hangar served as a visual navigation marker for aircraft attempting VFR landings at Karachi. Construction began in 1927 and was completed in 1929. In 1952, the Government of Pakistan decided to demolish the structure for scrap metal; demolition was carried out in 1961, with the steel used in railway construction.

The mast was never used, but the hangar served Imperial Airways Handley Page H.P.42s and A.W.XV Atalantas. On 5 December 1938, the Governor of Sind opened a permanent terminal building (now Terminal 1), which featured a circular central hall and two wing sections.

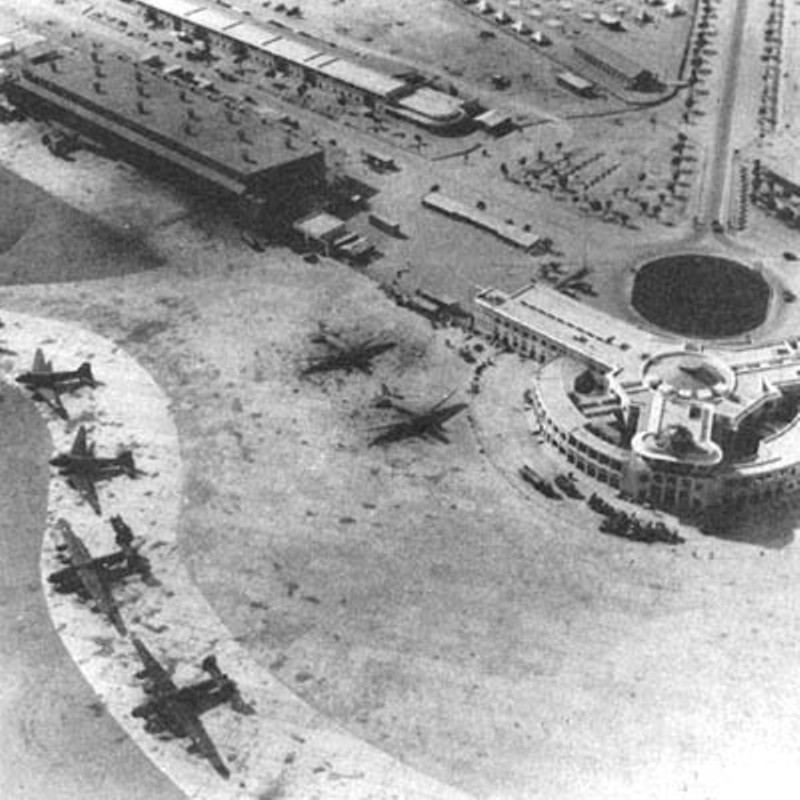
Karachi Airport in 1943 showing the air terminal and some of the apron.

During World War II, Karachi Airport served as a major transhipment base for United States Army Air Forces units and equipment supporting the Tenth Air Force in eastern India, Burma and the Fourteenth Air Force in China. Several operational bomber and fighter units passed through Karachi before deployment. Air Technical Service Command maintained extensive facilities where aircraft were received, assembled and tested prior to onward deployment. The airport also functioned as a major maintenance and supply depot. Air Transport Command operated numerous cargo and passenger flights to the Middle East and to points within British India and China.

In 1953, following the crash of a De Havilland Comet, Karachi Airport closed temporarily and commercial flights were relocated to PAF Base Masroor.

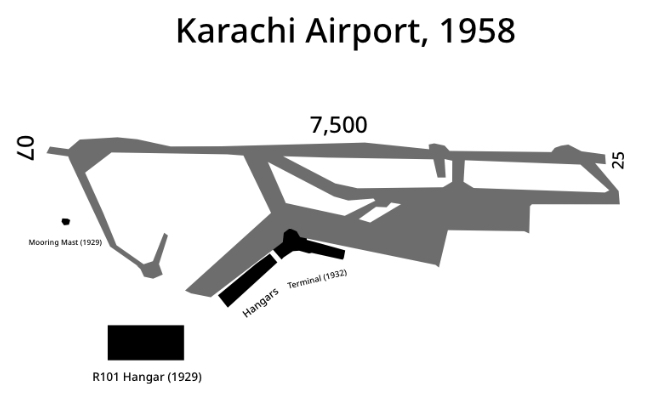
A reconstruction of Karachi Airport as it appeared in 1958.

On 25 January 1961, Runway 07L/25R was inaugurated by Finance Minister Mohammad Shoaib. The runway measured 10,500 feet in length and was constructed at a cost of Rs 28 million by employees of the US Corps of Engineers and the Vinnel Corporation. At the time, the airport was served by 13 international and domestic airlines.

On 3 November 1972, it was announced that Karachi International Airport would be expanded in two phases to meet rising passenger volumes. The first phase covered international arrival areas, the existing transit lounge and domestic areas, expected to be completed by October 1973. The second phase included a new international departure-cum-transit lounge and a car park, with capacity for 600 departure and transit passengers and an enlarged arrival lounge accommodating over 320 passengers.

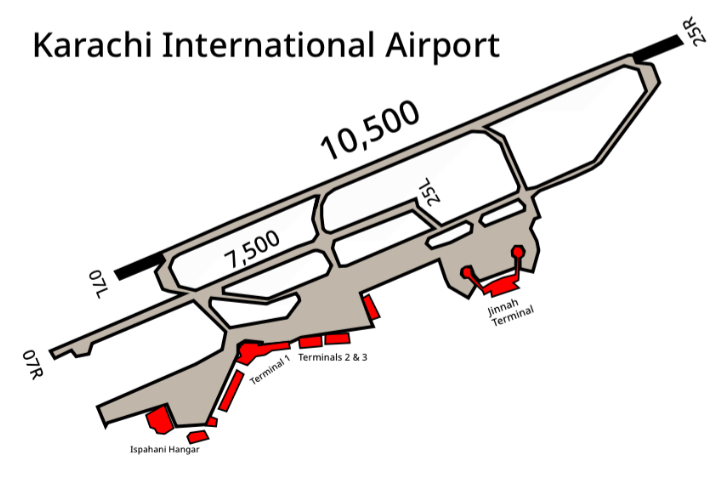
A reconstruction of Karachi International Airport as it appeared in 1992.

In 1978, Terminal 2 was built by Pakistan International Airlines to relieve congestion. The terminal measured 130 metres in length, contained two departure lounges accommodating 577 and 50 first class passengers respectively, could serve four wide-bodied aircraft simultaneously, cost 10 million Pakistani rupees and was designed to last 60 years. By that time, the airport was served by 29 airlines.

In 1985, the newly launched Emirates Airlines added Karachi as its first destination and had its first flight to KHI.

In February 1984, a fire severely damaged Terminal 2; Terminal 1 remained operational throughout. Construction of Terminal 3 followed in the late 1980s. The Jinnah Terminal began construction in January 1989 and was completed in June 1991 after approximately two years of construction and four years of planning, opening to the public in August 1992. The planned expansion — which envisaged expanding the terminal to three times its original size with four satellite terminals, 32 gates and an annual capacity of eight million passengers — was not completed. An expansion programme in 1994 extended Runway 07R/25L from 7,500 feet to its current length of 11,155 feet. The Jinnah Terminal now handles both domestic and international flights; Terminal 2 is dedicated to Hajj operations; Terminal 1 houses the headquarters of the Civil Aviation Authority; and Terminal 3 is used for commercial offices. Following completion of the Jinnah Terminal, the airport was renamed Quaid-i-Azam International Airport.

In approximately 1992–93, Karachi Airport handled 2,766,449 international passengers and 2,570,827 domestic passengers.

Between the 1960s and 1980s, the airport served as an online station for airlines including BOAC, Qantas and Pan Am, featuring prominently on Eurasia routes. In March 2006, Pakistan International Airlines began a non-stop service to Toronto on Boeing 777 aircraft.

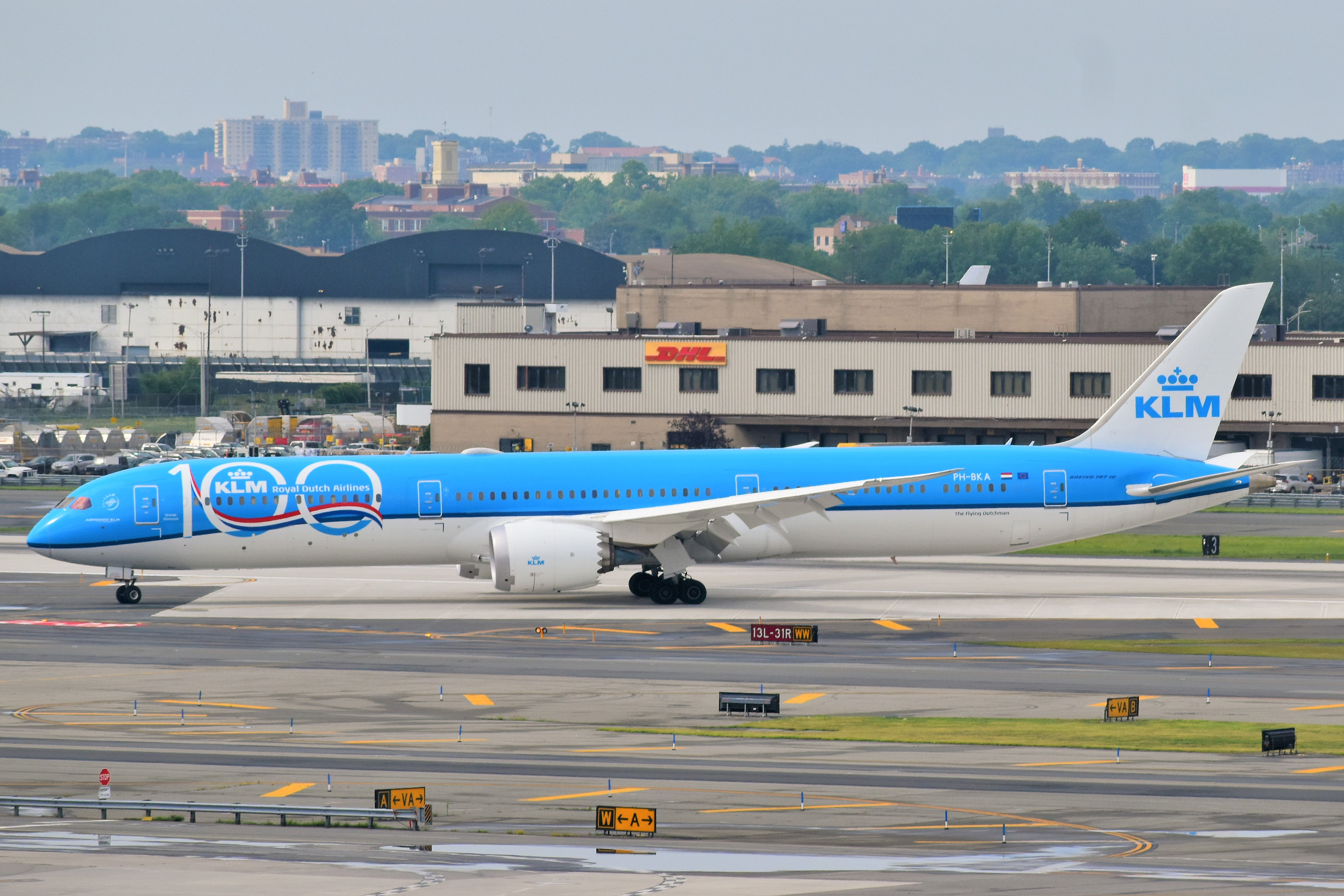
KLM was among the first international airlines to serve Karachi, in 1929.

== Structure ==
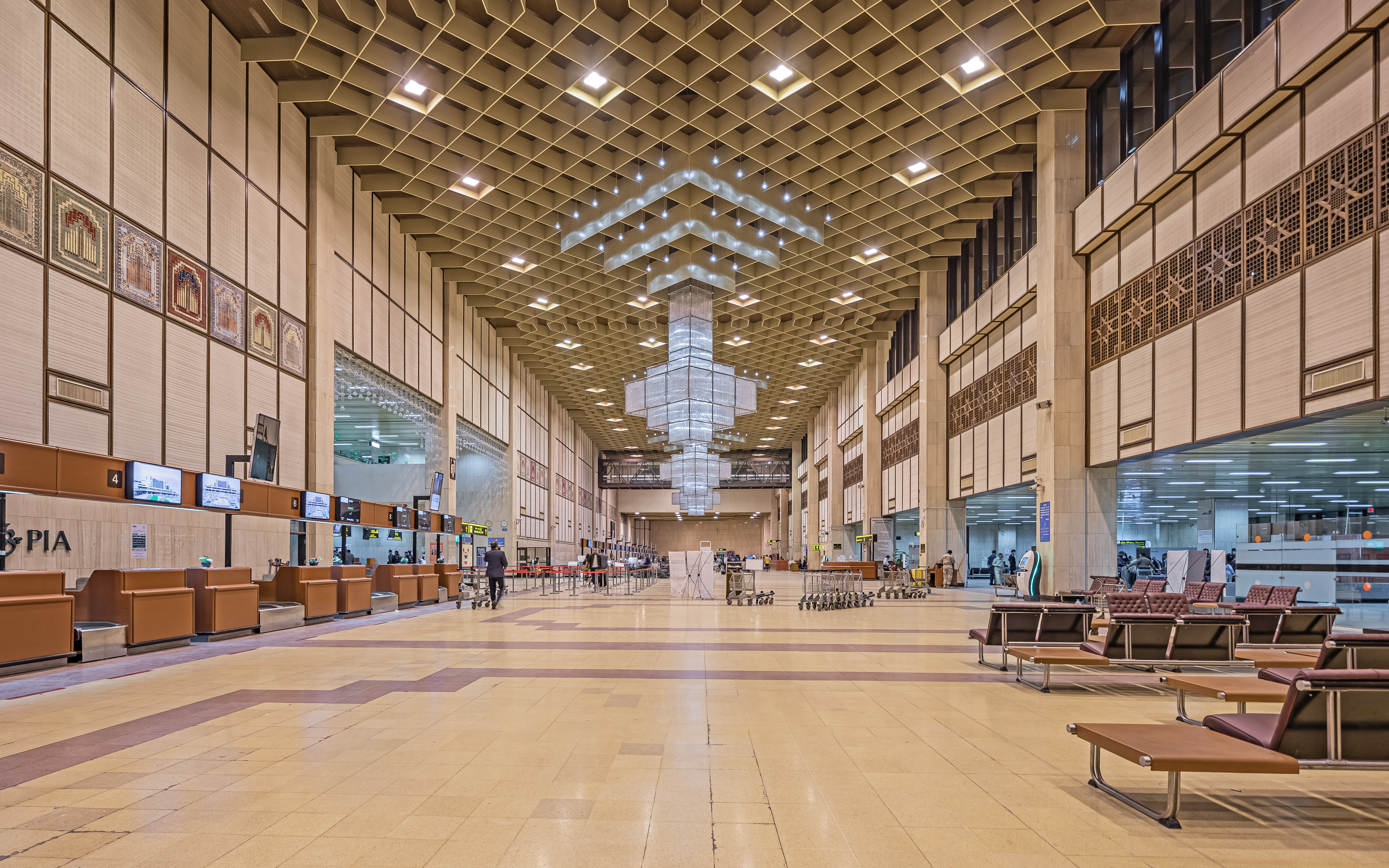
Interior of the terminal

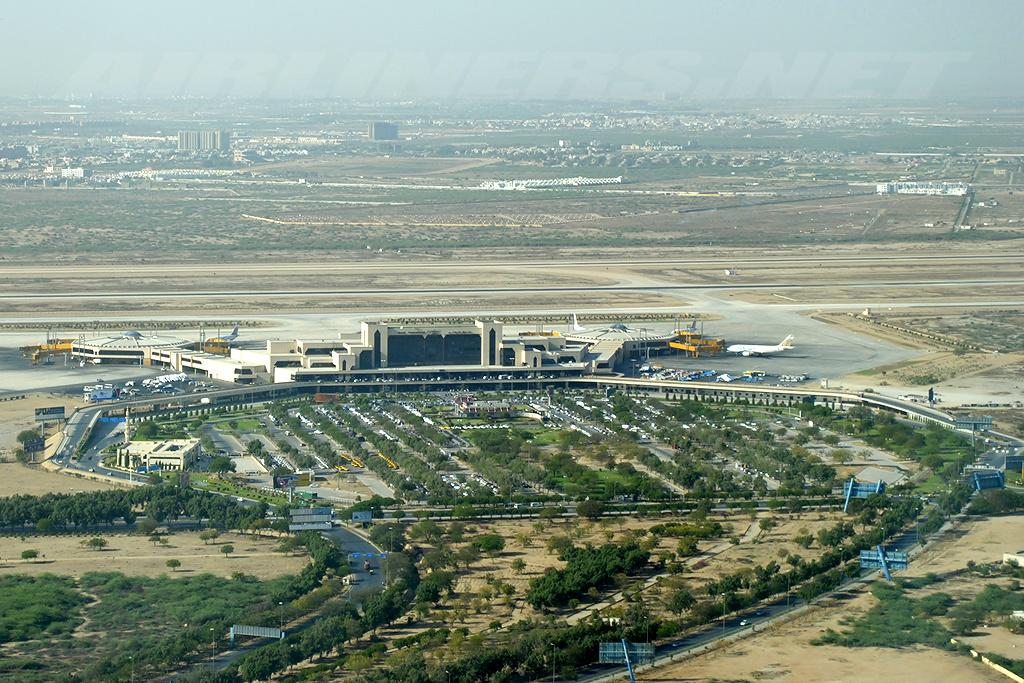
Aerial view of Jinnah International Airport, 2010

Jinnah International Airport has a capacity of handling 12 million passengers annually. In fiscal year 2008–09, over 5,725,052 passengers used the airport and 50,095 aircraft movements were registered.

Jinnah International Airport serves as a focus city for Pakistan International Airlines (PIA), whose primary hub has shifted to Islamabad. All major Pakistani airlines use Jinnah International Airport as a hub, including airblue, SereneAir, Fly Jinnah, and AirSial, as well as several charter carriers.

The building is linked via connecting corridors to two satellites, each with eight passenger-loading bridges. The eastern satellite handles international operations exclusively; the western satellite accommodates domestic operations and some international services through a flexible gate arrangement. The two satellites supplement the departure lounges and provide shopping facilities, mobile recharging points, and snack counters.

=== Jinnah Terminal ===
The Jinnah Terminal was completed in August 1992 at a cost of US$100 million, making it at the time the most expensive civil construction project in Pakistan. Construction began in January 1989 following approximately four years of planning.

The Pakistan Civil Aviation Authority (PCAA) commissioned the project with technical support from Air Consult, the design arm of the Frankfurt Airport Authority, which provided expertise in translating complex air traffic data into architectural form. The Pakistani public engineering consultancy NESPAK (National Engineering Services Pakistan) coordinated the project, assembling a team of nearly a hundred professionals, with Mukhtar Husain serving as chief architect and Abdul Malik as co-engineer. The construction contract was awarded to Sogea, a French firm. The building's precast concrete façade panels required nearly a year of experimentation at a purpose-built facility to achieve the desired colour and texture; the cladding has since shown minimal deterioration over several decades.

The design team sought to reflect Pakistan's architectural heritage through the building's form. The overall geometry and massing were primarily dictated by functional and traffic requirements under the guidance of Air Consult, but once the principal volumes were established, the NESPAK team addressed questions of cultural identity. The exterior form emerged as a contemporary composition referencing traditional architectural geometries, a design logic that extended into the interior.

=== Interior design ===
The terminal's interior was designed to embed Pakistani craft traditions into the building's functional fabric rather than applying them as a decorative layer. Wooden lattice screens in the jaali tradition, executed by local artisans, conceal office windows on the upper levels of the check-in hall. Their geometric motifs extend through the baffle ceiling, terrazzo flooring, and wall panelling, all derived from the building's modular grid and repeating at varying scales to maintain visual coherence across different surfaces.

Acoustic requirements in the check-in hall led to the incorporation of local hand-loom fabrics, treated and installed at scale, drawing on Pakistan's textile industry. Hand-knotted silk carpets produced by weavers in Karachi and Hyderabad, their production distributed among individual home weavers and brought together into a unified composition, form a continuous band across the departure hall walls, absorbing sound while asserting a local craft tradition. Terrazzo flooring, manufactured through a purpose-built local facility, was selected for durability under sustained heavy use.

Large geometric chandeliers, scaled to the volume of each hall, were conceived as sculptural lighting elements whose form echoes the building's geometry. The interior palette of warm browns and beiges establishes continuity with the exterior cladding, with marble accents at points including the fountain on the approach to the satellite concourse.

=== Ispahani Hangar ===
The Ispahani Hangar is PIA's wide-body aircraft maintenance hangar at Jinnah International Airport, named in honour of Mirza Ahmad Ispahani, the first and longest-serving chairperson of Pakistan International Airlines from 1954 to 1962. The hangar, which accommodates wide-body and narrow-body aircraft alongside a supporting airframe overhaul shop, was completed and commissioned in 1968. The PIA maintenance facility also services aircraft of other airlines.

On 15 February 2006, the first major overhaul (C check) of a Boeing 777-200ER was carried out at the Ispahani Hangar.

In 2007, government inspectors found evidence of poor maintenance on a PIA Boeing 747 operating a Karachi–United Kingdom service, following an incident in which an engine fell onto a Manchester Airport runway shortly after landing.

=== Terminals ===
Jinnah International Airport has one main terminal, divided into two concourses and five floors. The Jinnah East Satellite Concourse handles international flights; the Jinnah West Satellite Concourse is used for domestic flights.

The airport also has Terminal 2, dedicated to Hajj flights, and Terminal 3, used for commercial offices. Terminals 2 and 3 previously handled international flights before the construction of the Jinnah Terminal. Terminal 2, built in 1978, initially served as an arrival building for international PIA flights and a departure building for domestic services; Terminal 3 was added in the late 1980s. Terminal 1 houses the headquarters of the Civil Aviation Authority of Pakistan. According to a 1985 terminal map, Terminal 1 at that time contained shops, a duty-free booking office, an international departures lounge, ticketing, car rental services, bank branches, a 24-hour restaurant, a mosque, and airline counters on the ground floor, with airline offices and a staff cafeteria on the first floor.

The airport's ATC building is located on top of the Terminal 1 building. It was constructed in 1938 and is planned to be replaced by a new control tower.

Pakistan International Airlines maintains several headquarters departments on the airport grounds, as well as its central mainframe (CRC Building), which houses the PIA frequent flyer programme (Awards+), SITA Bagtrak, and the IATA global lost luggage tracking network.

The CIP Lounge is available to all first class and business class passengers on outbound flights. Dedicated lounges have also been introduced by Barclays, UBL, and airblue in the international terminal.

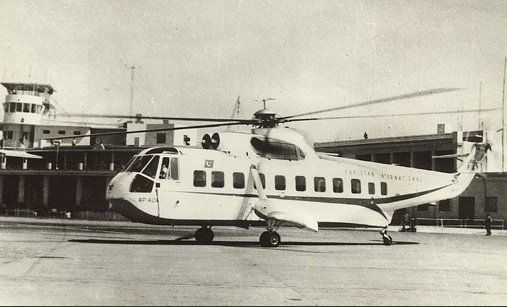
A Pakistan International Airlines helicopter at Karachi Airport Terminal 1 in the 1960s.

=== Runways and aprons ===
The airport has two runways, measuring 3,200 m (10,500 ft) and 3,400 m (11,200 ft) in length respectively. Runways 25R/07L and 25L/07R have widths of 46 m (151 ft) and 45 m (148 ft) respectively. The runways are capable of handling aircraft including the Airbus A380, Airbus A350 XWB, and Antonov An-225 Mriya, with a capacity of 15 flights per hour and the capability for simultaneous landings and take-offs. Runways 25R and 25L are equipped with ILS CAT-I. The taxiway accommodates up to 12 aircraft simultaneously; the parking area covers 266,000 square metres (2,860,000 sq ft) and accommodates 42 aircraft, 12 via air bridges and 30 at remote bays.

An upgraded runway became operational on 19 February 2026 following an 18-month redevelopment costing Rs8 billion.

== Airlines and destinations ==
=== Passenger ===
| Airlines | Destinations |
|---|---|
| Air Arabia | Sharjah |
| Air China | Beijing–Capital |
| AirAsia X | Kuala Lumpur–International(Suspended) |
| Airblue | Dubai–International, Islamabad, Lahore |
| AirSial | Islamabad, Jeddah, Lahore, Peshawar, Quetta, Sialkot |
| Batik Air Malaysia | Kuala Lumpur–International |
| Biman Bangladesh Airlines | Dhaka |
| Centrum Air | Tashkent |
| Emirates | Dubai–International |
| Ethiopian Airlines | Addis Ababa |
| Etihad Airways | Abu Dhabi |
| Fly Baghdad | Baghdad |
| Fly Jinnah | Abu Dhabi (Begins 28 November 2026), Faisalabad, Islamabad, Jeddah, Lahore, Multan, Peshawar, Quetta, Sialkot |
| Flyadeal | Dammam, Jeddah, Medina, Riyadh |
| Flydubai | Dubai–International |
| Flynas | Dammam, Jeddah, Medina, Riyadh |
| Gulf Air | Bahrain |
| Iran Air | Mashhad |
| Iraqi Airways | Baghdad, Najaf |
| Jazeera Airways | Kuwait City |
| Kish Air | Chabahar/Konarak |
| Oman Air | Muscat |
| Pakistan International Airlines | Dammam, Faisalabad, Islamabad, Jeddah, Lahore, Medina, Multan, Riyadh, Skardu, Sukkur, Toronto–Pearson, Turbat |
| Pegasus Airlines | Istanbul–Sabiha Gökçen |
| Qatar Airways | Doha |
| SalamAir | Muscat |
| Saudia | Jeddah, Riyadh |
| Serene Air | Islamabad, Jeddah, Lahore, Peshawar, Quetta (all suspended) |
| South Air | Bahawalpur, Quetta, Turbat |
| SriLankan Airlines | Colombo–Bandaranaike |
| Taban Air | Mashhad, Tehran–Imam Khomeini |
| Thai Airways International | Bangkok–Suvarnabhumi |
| Turkish Airlines | Istanbul |

=== Cargo ===
| Airlines | Destinations |
|---|---|
| DHL Aviation | Abu Dhabi, Bagram, Bahrain |
| MNG Airlines | Kabul |
| Qatar Airways Cargo | Doha |
| Royal Jordanian Cargo | Amman–Queen Alia, Dubai–International |
| SF Airlines | Guiyang |
| TCS Courier | Dubai–International, Islamabad, Lahore |
| Turkish Cargo | Colombo–Bandaranaike, Istanbul, Singapore |
| YTO Cargo Airlines | Kashgar, Kunming, Nanning |
| Emirates SkyCargo | Dubai-World Central |

== Statistics ==
The following table provides details of the major traffic flows at Karachi Airport collected by the Civil Aviation Authority of Pakistan:

| Year | Aircraft movements (commercial) | Passengers (intl. & domestic) | Cargo handled (M. tons) | Mail handled (M. tons) |
|---|---|---|---|---|
| 2006–07 | 52,990 | 5,460,328 | 152,364 | 2,828 |
| 2007–08 | 50,622 | 5,865,859 | 161,762 | 2,832 |
| 2008–09 | 49,920 | 5,698,164 | 144,993 | 2,189 |
| 2009–10 | 53,295 | 5,832,494 | 149,498 | 2,787 |
| 2010–11 | 50,924 | 6,032,999 | 142,364 | 2,324 |
| 2011–12 | 52,682 | 5,968,531 | 142,544 | 2,478 |
| 2012–13 | 49,075 | 5,966,349 | 154,924 | 1,984 |
| 2013–14 | 48,519 | 6,397,316 | 136,124 | 2,101 |
| 2014–15 | 48,832 | 6,267,068 | 125,716 | 2,747 |
| 2015–16 | 54,509 | 6,602,181 | 124,346 | 13,236 |
| 2016–17 | 61,428 | 6,903,948 | 126,498 | 13,792 |
| 2017–18 | 51,890 | 7,267,026 | 130,361 | 12,214 |
| 2018–19 | 42,339 | 6,802,121 | 120,559 | 23,909 |
| 2019–20 | 31,200 | 4,381,949 | 97,742 | 8,936 |
| 2020–21 | 26,743 | 3,366,509 | 97,887 | 4,396 |
| 2021–22 | 35,259 | 5,165,904 | 94,560 | 1,698 |
| 2022–23 | 38,735 | 5,883,291 | 92,453 | 942 |
| 2023–24 | 41,754 | 6,460,547 | 104,988 | 512 |

Historical statistics:

| Year | Annual Passengers | Cargo (tonnes) | Aircraft Movements | Transport Movements |
|---|---|---|---|---|
| 1960 | 350,000 | N/A | N/A | N/A |
| 1967 | 817,516 | N/A | N/A | N/A |
| 1968 | 1,050,000 | N/A | N/A | N/A |
| 1970–71 | 862,942 | 13,236 | 48,044 | 20,995 |
| 1974–75 | 1,434,670 | 31,487 | 49,357 | 23,496 |
| 1975–76 | 1,762,568 | 37,415 | 70,703 | 27,194 |
| 1977 | 2,422,349 | 45,428 | N/A | 30,388 |

During that period, Karachi Airport was among the busiest in West and South Asia and was served by more international airlines than it is today.

Busiest routes at Jinnah International Airport (by number of flights weekly)
| Rank | City | Country | Number of flights | Airlines |
|---|---|---|---|---|
| 1 | Islamabad | Pakistan | 105 | Serene Air, Pakistan International Airlines, airblue, AirSial, Fly Jinnah |
| 2 | Dubai | United Arab Emirates | 78 | Emirates, Pakistan International Airlines, flydubai |
| 3 | Lahore | Pakistan | 69 | airblue, Pakistan International Airlines, Serene Air, AirSial |
| 4 | Jeddah | Saudi Arabia | 36 | airblue, Pakistan International Airlines, Saudia |
| 5 | Sharjah | United Arab Emirates | 27 | Air Arabia, Pakistan International Airlines |
| 6 | Muscat | Oman | 22 | Oman Air, SalamAir, Pakistan International Airlines |
| 7 | Doha | Qatar | 19 | Qatar Airways, Pakistan International Airlines |
| 8 | Abu Dhabi | United Arab Emirates | 16 | Etihad Airways, Pakistan International Airlines |
| 9 | Istanbul | Turkey | 11 | Turkish Airlines, Pegasus Airlines, Pakistan International Airlines |
| 10 | Bahrain | Bahrain | 11 | Gulf Air |

Traffic flow 2018–19
| Total aircraft movement (number) | | | | | Total passengers (numbers) | | | Total cargo (M. tons) | | | Total mail (M. tons) | | |
| Commercial | | | Non-commercial | Grand total | Domestic | International | Total | Domestic | International | Total | Domestic | International | Total |
|---|---|---|---|---|---|---|---|---|---|---|---|---|---|
| Domestic | International | Total | Non-commercial | Grand total | Domestic | International | Total | Domestic | International | Total | Domestic | International | Total |
| 23,598 | 23,207 | 46,805 | 427 | 47,232 | 2,526,702 | 3,685,783 | 6,212,485 | 18,181 | 81,723 | 99,904 | 65 | 22,254 | 22,319 |

== Ground transport ==
Jinnah International Airport is situated near Gulistan-e-Jauhar and Malir and is accessible via Shahrah-e-Faisal. The airport has a heptagonal car park accommodating more than 3,000 vehicles. Buses, minibuses and taxis serve the airport, and auto-rickshaws are available for short journeys within the city. Karachi Cantonment railway station is the nearest mainline railway station. A commuter rail station, Karachi Airport Station, is located approximately 2 km southwest of the main Jinnah Terminal, south of Star Gate.

== Accidents and incidents ==
In 2009, Airport Security Force officials arrested a man at the airport after discovering a handgun in his laptop bag, which he was attempting to smuggle aboard an Emirates flight to Dubai.

In 2013, the son of Pakistan Peoples Party MNA Sher Muhammad Baloch was arrested for assaulting a PIA reservation officer at the airport.

In 2018, five FIA officials were suspended following an incident in which a passenger was manhandled at the airport.

In June 2014, at least 28 people, including all ten attackers, were killed when Taliban-linked militants attacked the airport.

In 2024, a bomb attack attributed to the Balochistan Liberation Army near the airport killed two people and wounded eight others.

| Date | Aircraft | Registration | Flight no | Airline | Occupants | Fatalities | Details |
|---|---|---|---|---|---|---|---|
| 27 December 1947 | Douglas DC-3 | VT-AUG | 1947 Korangi Creek crash | Air-India | 23 | 23 | The DC-3 lost control after takeoff and struck the ground at a 30-degree angle during a violent sideslip to the right. |
| 3 March 1953 | de Havilland DH-106 Comet 1A | CF-CUN | | Canadian Pacific Air Lines (CP Air) | 11 | 11 | Failed to take off and crashed into a dry river bed; the first fatal passenger jet airliner crash. |
| 5 August 1956 | Hermes IV | G-ALDK | | Britavia | | | Suffered collapse of the nose undercarriage at Drigh Road Airport. The aircraft was damaged beyond economic repair. |
| 14 August 1959 | Vickers Viscount | AP-AJE | | Pakistan International Airlines | 3 | 2 | Aircraft crashed at Karachi International Airport while attempting an overshoot with two engines inoperative on a training flight. |
| 5 September 1986 | Boeing 747-121 | N656PA | Pan Am Flight 73 | Pan American World Airways | 381 | 20 | Aircraft was hijacked by Palestinian gunmen posing as airport officials upon arrival from Bombay (now Mumbai). Twenty people were killed when the gunmen opened fire on passengers as commandos prepared to storm the aircraft. |
| 5 November 2010 | Beechcraft 1900 | AP-BJD | JS Air Flight 201 | JS Air | 21 | 21 | A plane chartered by the Italian oil company ENI crashed a minute after takeoff, killing all 21 on board — 17 ENI employees, two pilots, a security guard and a technician, of whom 20 were Pakistani nationals and one an Italian national. |
| 28 November 2010 | Ilyushin Il-76 | 4L-GNI | Sun Way Flight 4412 | Sun Way | 8 | 10 | Aircraft crashed in a populated area of Karachi shortly after takeoff, killing all eight on board and two people on the ground, after reportedly attempting to return to the airport following an engine fire. |
| 22 May 2020 | Airbus A320-214 | AP-BLD | Pakistan International Airlines Flight 8303 | Pakistan International Airlines | 99 | 97 | A domestic flight from Lahore to Karachi crashed into the Model Colony residential area while on a second ILS approach to Jinnah International Airport. |
| 7 July 2026 | Boeing 737-400SF | AP-BOI | K2 Airways Flight 1732 | K2 Airways | 5 | 5 (presumed) | Aircraft crashed near the coast of Ormara in route to Karachi-Jinnah International Airport from Sharjah. There were reportedly at least 5 people onboard. Searches for the crew have been ongoing. |

== See also ==
- Pakistan Civil Aviation Authority
- Transport in Pakistan
