= Sun Way Flight 4412 =

2010 aviation accident in Pakistan

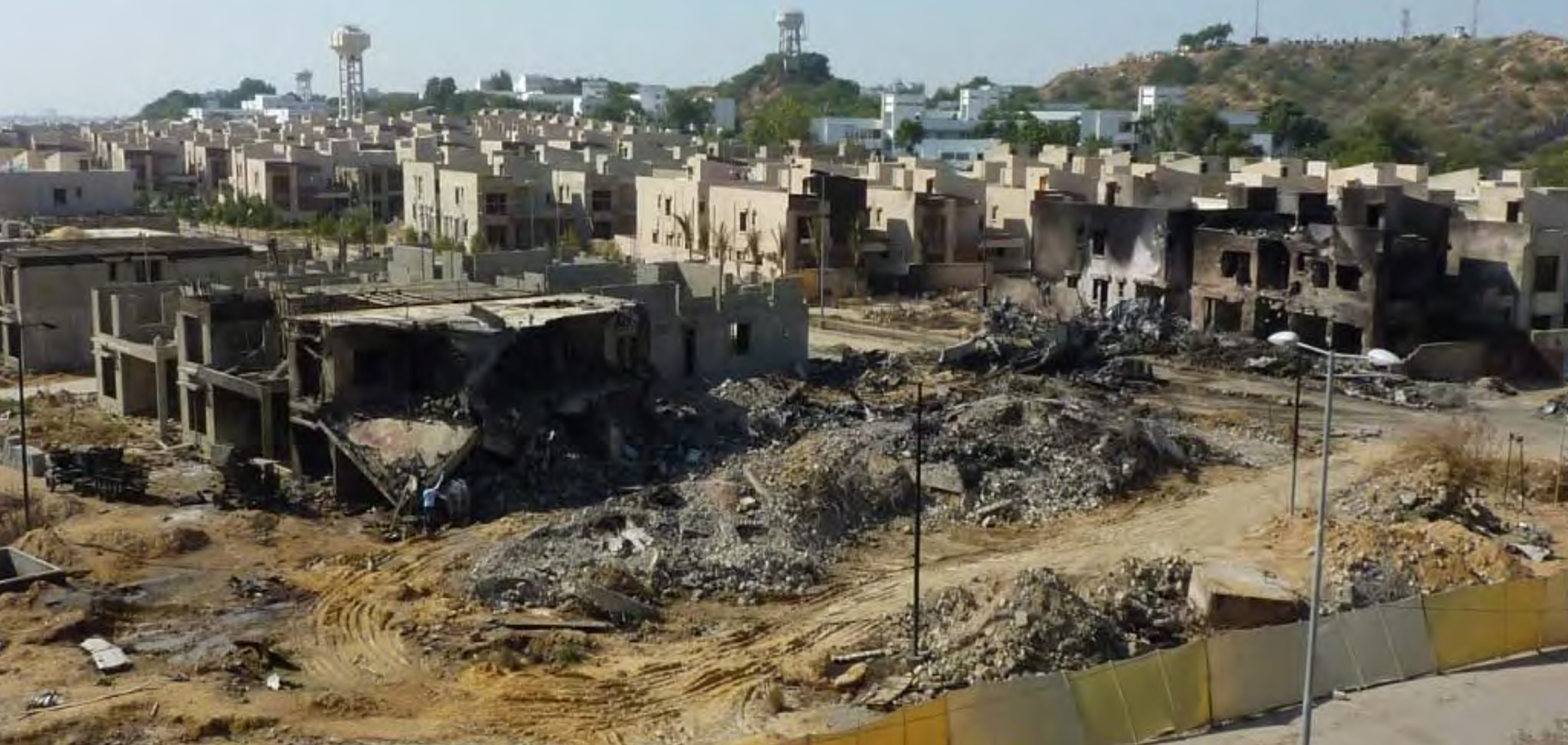
- Accident site of the aircraft

Accident
- Date: 28 November 2010
- Summary: Uncontained engine failure on takeoff due to metal fatigue leading to loss of control
- Site: West of Jinnah International Airport, Karachi, Pakistan; 24°53.65′N 067°06.41′E
- Total fatalities: 12

Aircraft
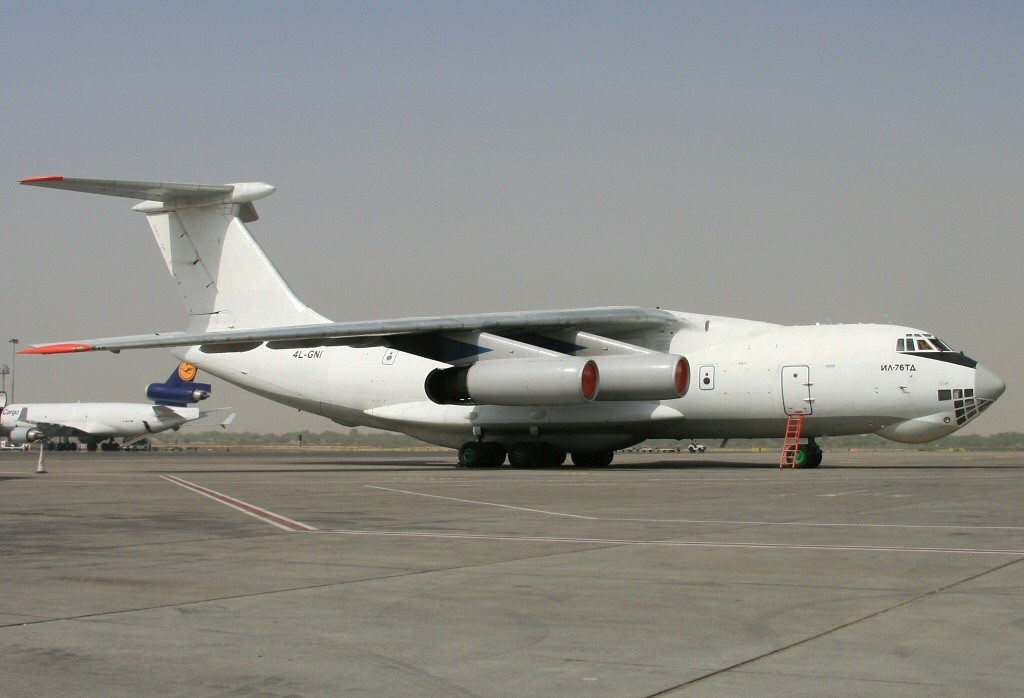
- 4L-GNI, the aircraft involved in the accident
- Aircraft type: Ilyushin Il-76TD
- Operator: Sun Way
- Registration: 4L-GNI
- Flight origin: Jinnah International Airport, Karachi, Pakistan
- Destination: Khartoum International Airport, Sudan
- Occupants: 8
- Crew: 8
- Fatalities: 8
- Survivors: 0

Ground casualties
- Ground fatalities: 4

Sun Way Flight 4412 was an international scheduled cargo flight from Karachi, Pakistan, to Khartoum, Sudan. On 28 November 2010, the Ilyushin Il-76 operating the flight crashed while attempting to return to Karachi after one of the engines catastrophically failed shortly after take-off. Twelve people were killed in the crash: everyone on board the aircraft and four people on the ground. (Note: According to The Aviation Herald. The Aviation Safety Network says that only 3 people on the ground were killed.) The engine failure was caused by metal fatigue resulting from operation of the engine beyond its design life.

== Accident ==
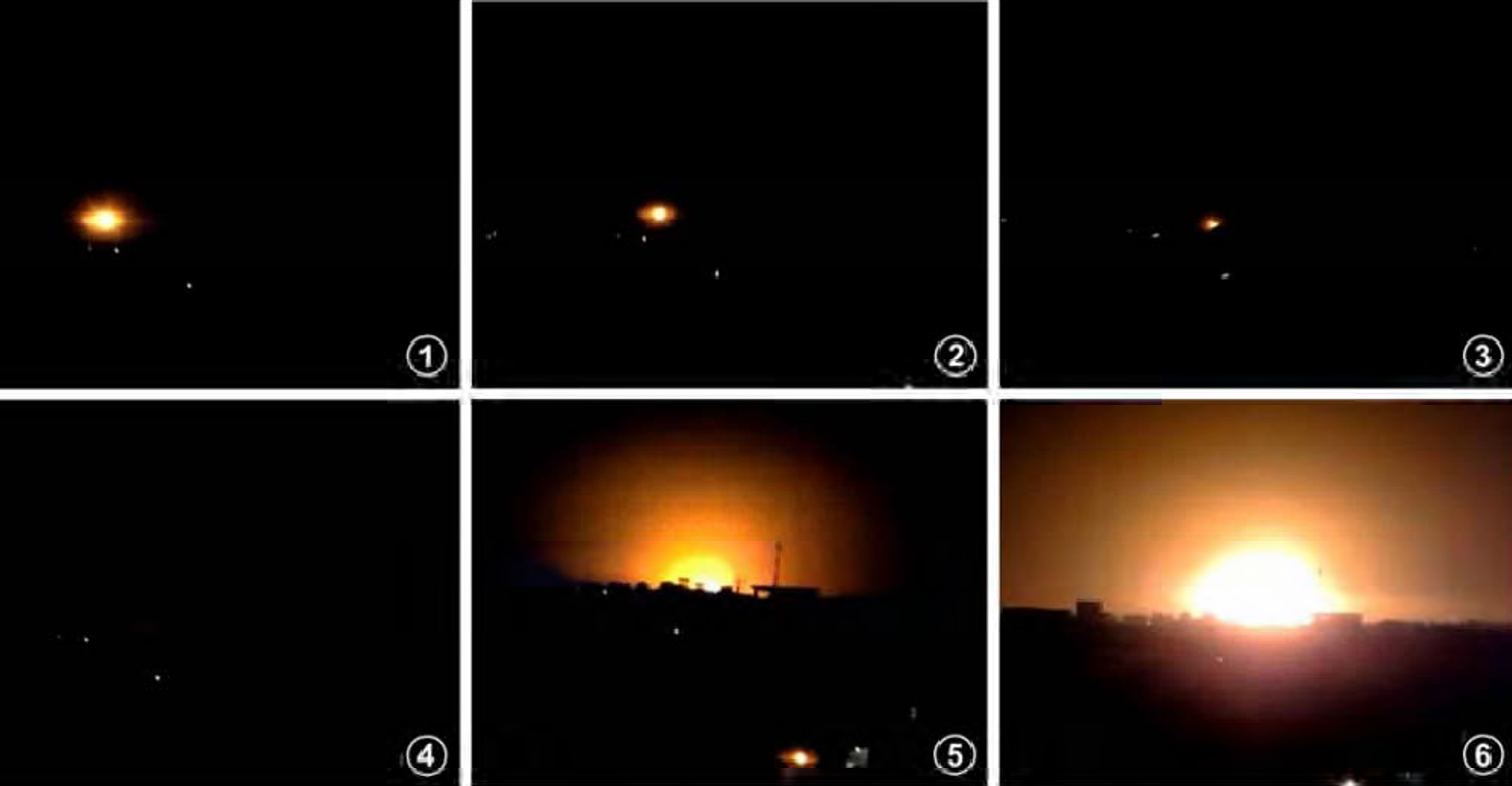
Video footage of the aircraft on fire and the crash

Flight 4412 departed Karachi's Jinnah International Airport at 01:48 local time (20:48 UTC, 27 November) bound for Khartoum International Airport. The Ilyushin Il-76TD was carrying 31 tonnes of relief supplies for Sudan, reported to be a cargo of tents. The crew of eight was composed of Russian and Ukrainian members.

Eyewitnesses saw that one of the starboard engines was on fire as the aircraft climbed out of Jinnah. It then crashed into buildings under construction at a housing complex for the Pakistan Navy, setting several of them on fire, around 3 km (1.9 mi; 1.6 nmi) from the end of the runway. Rescue authorities confirmed that four people were killed that were not on board the aircraft.

The force of the explosion was so great that local residents thought that a bomb had exploded. The ground casualties were reported to be construction workers.

== Aircraft ==
The aircraft involved was an Ilyushin Il-76TD with Georgian registration 4L-GNI, that was being operated by Sun Way, a Georgian cargo airline. The aircraft was reported as having undergone a thorough technical inspection in the two weeks prior to the accident.

== Crew and victims ==
Nationality	Fatalities		Total
Nationality	Crew	On Ground	Total
Ukraine	7	0	7
Pakistan	0	4	4
Russia	1	0	1
Total	8	4	12

The captain of Sun Way Flight 4412 was a 57-year old Ukrainian national. He had around 7,272 total flying hours at the time of the accident, including 5,502 flight hours on the Ilyushin IL-76. The first officer was a 47-year old Ukrainian national who had 2,220 total flying hours at the time of the accident.

== Investigation ==
The Civil Aviation Authority of Pakistan conducted an investigation into the accident. It emerged that the certified design life of the airframe and engines had expired in 2004, seven years before the accident, and that since then the aircraft had been operated without the manufacturer's approval. The weight of the Il-76 at take-off also exceeded by 5 tons the maximum allowed of 190 tons.

The investigation determined that the accident sequence started with an uncontained failure of the second stage disk of the low-pressure compressor of engine number four, shortly after take-off. The failure was attributed to metal fatigue and was considered a direct result of the operation of the engine well past its design life.

Debris ejected by the failed engine struck the right wing, damaging the flaps and piercing the fuel tanks. Fuel from the tanks ignited, further damaging the wing and flight controls to the extent that control of the aircraft could no longer be maintained. The aircraft then rolled out of control to the right and crashed to the ground.
