= JS Air Flight 201 =

2010 aviation accident

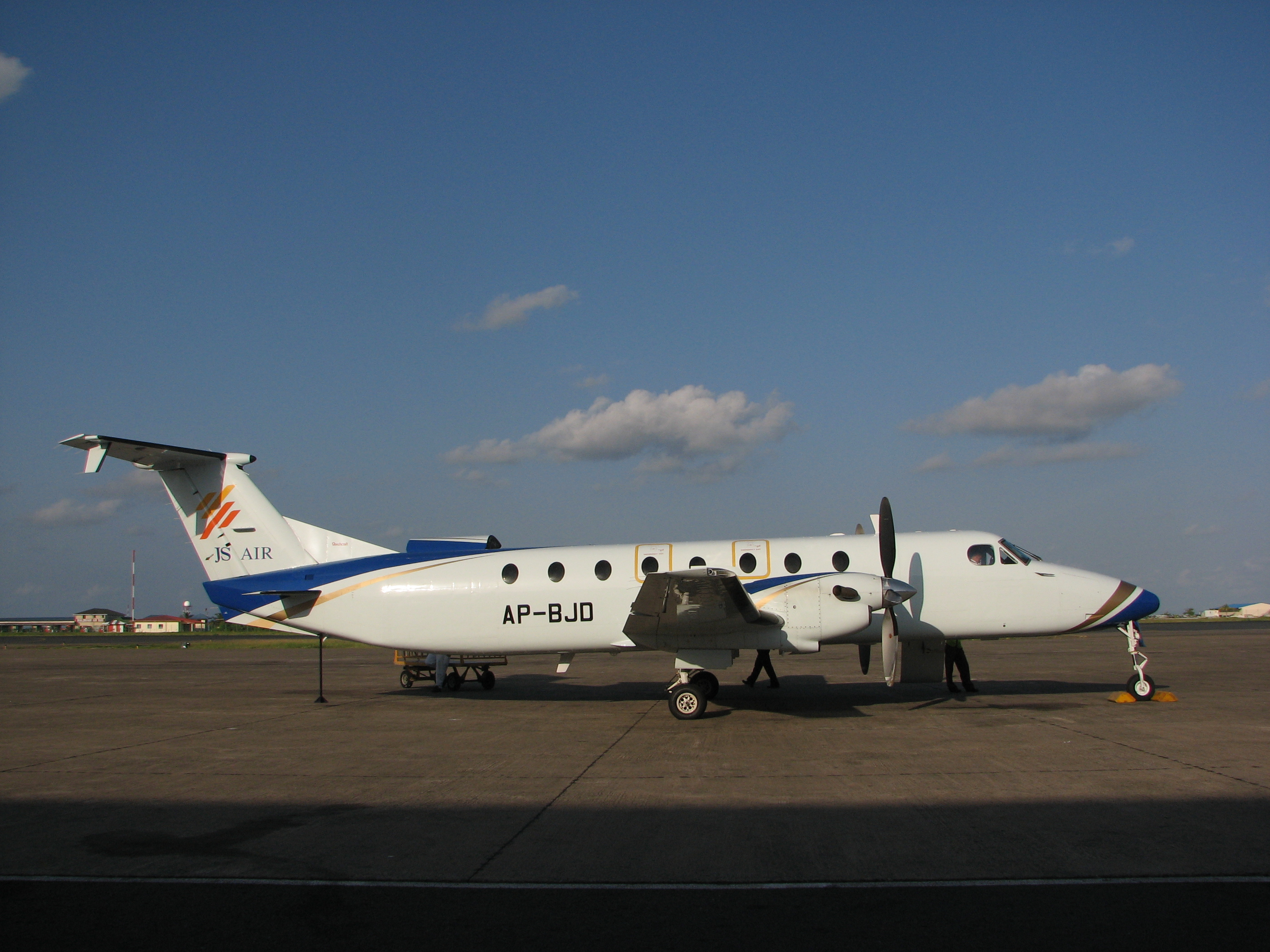
- AP-BJD, the Beechcraft 1900 involved, seen in 2007

Accident
- Date: 5 November 2010
- Summary: Crashed following engine failure at take-off and loss of control
- Site: Near Jinnah International Airport, Karachi, Pakistan; 24°54′19″N 067°07′55″E

Aircraft
- Aircraft type: Beechcraft 1900C-1
- Operator: JS Air
- Call sign: JS201
- Registration: AP-BJD
- Flight origin: Jinnah International Airport, Karachi, Pakistan
- Destination: Bhit Shah airfield, Jamshoro district, Sindh, Pakistan
- Occupants: 21
- Passengers: 17
- Crew: 4
- Fatalities: 21
- Survivors: 0

On 5 November 2010, JS Air Flight 201, a Beechcraft 1900 passenger aircraft on a charter service from Karachi to the Bhit Shah gas field in Sindh, Pakistan, crashed near Karachi's Jinnah International Airport, after suffering an engine malfunction at take-off. All 21 people on board were killed.

The investigation by Pakistan's Civil Aviation Authority concluded that the primary cause of the accident was the "inappropriate skill level" of the captain in dealing with the malfunction, and more generally the flight crew's non-adherence to the procedures prescribed by the aircraft manufacturer in such abnormal circumstances.

== Background ==
=== Aircraft ===
The aircraft involved was a twin-turboprop Beechcraft 1900C-1, with Pakistani registration AP-BJD. It was built in 1991 and at the time of the accident had accumulated around 18,000 flight hours.

=== Passengers and crew ===
On board the aircraft were 17 passengers, two pilots, a technician and a security guard.

| Nationality | Passengers | Crew | Total |
|---|---|---|---|
| Italy | 1 | 0 | 1 |
| Pakistan | 16 | 4 | 20 |
| Total | 17 | 4 | 21 |

The captain was 53-year-old Naeem-ul-Haq, a Pakistani national born in 1957. He was described as quite religious. He joined the Pakistan Air Force (PAF) Academy in Risalpur in 1977 as a trainee pilot. During his service career, he flew various training / fighter and light communication aircraft including MFI-17, T-37, FT-5, FT-6, Piper (Seneca-II), Beech Baron, Y-12, Super King (B-200), Cessna 172 and Cessna 402 aircraft. He retired at the rank of squadron leader from PAF in 2003 while accumulating 6,279 hours. Naeem began flying for JS Air as a first officer in June 2006. He had accumulated a total flying experience of 8,114 hours, including 1,820 hours on the Beechcraft-1900.

The first officer was 33-year-old Noman Shamsi, a Pakistani national born in 1977. He was given multi-engine aircraft rating on Cessna 402 aircraft on 23 December 2004 after completing all requirements/formalities by CAA Pakistan. He joined JS Air and underwent his Beechcraft 1900 ground and simulator training in the United Kingdom in 2006 and successfully accomplished his training. After completing his flying training at JS Air, he was cleared by CAA Pakistan to fly as co-pilot under supervision in February 2007. He became a captain in March 2010. The first officer had accumulated a total flying experience of 1,746 hours, with 1,338 of them on the Beechcraft 1900.

== Accident ==
The aircraft had been chartered to fly 17 personnel of Italian oil and gas company Eni from Jinnah International Airport in Karachi to the Bhit Shah gas field. Three crew members and one airport security guard were also on board. At 01:55 UTC, the flight crew contacted Karachi Ground for take off. The Karachi Ground Controller replied "copied JS-201 start up approved runway two five left" and this was acknowledged by cockpit crew. The Captain cleared the area towards left side and began start up procedure for Engine No 1.

Following this the crew contacted Karachi Ground requesting taxi instructions which were given. Having received this the pilots conducted the pre-take off checklist. Cockpit Voice Recorder (CVR) data shows that the right engine propeller feathering system was checked as being in manual position. As per procedure, run up checks are supposed to be carried out and the feathering function of both engines is to be checked simultaneously. However, the pilots in this case only checked No 2 engine's feathering mechanism serviceability manually, contrary to the documented procedures.

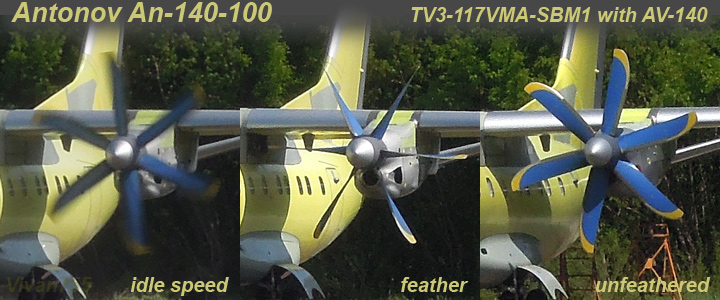
Sequence of a propeller at idle speed, feather, and unfeather

At 02:03 UTC, the aircraft was cleared for takeoff and left the runway. Shortly thereafter the right engine flamed out, and the airspeed started to decrease slightly. The First Officer then put the failed engine into feathered position. At this stage, it is considered likely that the pilot monitoring (PM) may have observed only partial feathering. Having made the Pilot Flying (PF) aware of this, the PM made further attempts to fully feather engine number two. This both wasted precious time and, despite being authorised by the captain, was contrary to the documented procedures that no remedial action be taken below 400 feet (120 m) above ground level. Both airmen are recorded discussing the issue pertaining to Engine No 2, despite this the captain goes on to request the First Officer inform Air Traffic Control (ATC) of an engine failure on takeoff, with the failure in the number one engine. This mistake is indicative of a high stress level within the cockpit, and the breaking down of situational awareness.

The air traffic control gave immediate clearance for an emergency return to Karachi, which was acknowledged by the flight crew. This acknowledgment would be the last contact with the stricken aircraft. Cockpit Voice Recorder (CVR) and Flight Data Recorder (FDR) data indicates that, after the last radio message, the captain observed the First Officer moving the feather control for engine number two, asking "What are you doing?" The first officer replied that the engine was not feathered properly. It seems likely that the first officer became fixated on this one goal, removing all other situational awareness and to the exclusion of other tasks. By this point, the speed of the aircraft was 102 knots (189 km/h; 117 mph) with increasing pitch attitude and right angle of bank.

On the CVR recording further reduction in engine sound was observed. Flight Data Recorder (FDR) information showed that bank angle continually increased. The high stress levels of both pilots resulted in near overload and loss of situational awareness. This meant that the asymmetrical thrust caused by full power application to the functional number one engine and lack of thrust from number two, went unnoticed and was not corrected. Landing gear remained extended and airspeed continued to bleed off, rapidly approaching stalling speed.

The cockpit voice recorder noted the beginning of continuous stall warning alerts. The captain is recorded calling out Holy verses from the Quran and "Bismillah (In the name of God)". The ground proximity warning alert, "whoop, whoop", could be heard until the end of the recording.

== Investigation ==
An inquiry was ordered into the crash. No evidence was found of a bird strike, pilot incapacitation, sabotage, in-flight structural failure or fire.

The investigation started with the examination on the plane's propellers, as evidence from the cockpit voice recorder (CVR) suggested that an engine failure occurred in mid-flight. Investigators retrieved the propeller from the wreckage and stated that the beta valve in the aircraft may have malfunctioned in mid flight. There are two possibilities of beta valve malfunction: mis-rigging after some maintenance work or fair wear and tear during routine service. Unfortunately, the beta system's integrity and rigging status could not be verified because the propeller governor had been completely consumed in the post ground impact fire. However, it was confirmed from the documented history and the engineering staff that there was neither any reported defect related to the beta system nor was there any scheduled or unscheduled maintenance performed in the recent past. Therefore, the only probable cause of occurrence could be fair wear and tear of the beta valve.

However, investigators stated that even if a mid-air engine failure occurred, the pilots still could have returned to the airport safely. If an aircraft had a mid air engine failure in one engine, the plane still could fly. All twin engine aircraft are designed to sustain a safe flight even if one of the engines has failed or is switched off due to any abnormality, provided the emergency handling procedures are correctly followed. Similarly, the Beechcraft 1900C also had the capability to sustain safe flight with single engine operation. This suggests that pilot error may be the main cause of the accident.

Investigators reviewed the CVR data and stated that the pilot may have lacked situational awareness. After experiencing the abnormal engine No 2 operation, at one stage the cockpit crew indicated confusion about the engine No 1 or 2 and subsequently transmitted incorrect information to the ATC Tower that they were experiencing abnormal operation of engine No 1. The first officer was exposed to a serious level of stress and anxiety when he observed the propeller feathering of No 2 (right) engine. The situation was aggravated due to the fact that the auto feathering was selected to "Off" which entailed the cockpit crew to manually manage feathering of the propeller in case of any anomaly. He did communicate to the captain correct information; however, the captain did not register engine No 2 and told him to inform ATC Tower that they were experiencing problem with engine No 1 and FO communicated the same without questioning the captain or correcting himself. He was mentally preoccupied to a level where he could not perform the recommended remedial action. Thus, he did not effectively contribute towards handling of abnormal set of conditions.

Investigators checking the captain's flight history discovered that his performance during simulator training check flights remained consistently below acceptable levels. He was not able to safely handle training scenarios during critical phases of takeoff and post-takeoff, and was only able to achieve satisfactory performance levels with coaching during these mandatory exercises. The final report stated that the captain suffered from "lack of confidence" and also revealed that the captain lacked the required proficiency and skills to independently handle aircraft operations with a single functioning engine during critical phases of flight.

Investigators concluded that the cockpit crew neither discussed nor raised the landing gear after takeoff. The wreckage also confirmed the landing gear were in the extended position at the time of ground impact. The Beechcraft 1900C aircraft has a very low rate of climb with landing gear in extended position due to increased drag while operating with a single engine. Any banking of the aircraft would aggravate the situation and the marginal rate of climb would degrade into a rate of descent, which happened in this particular case.

In December 2015, Pakistan's Safety Investigation Board released their final report stating that the accident was caused by the inability of the captain to handle the abnormal operation of engine No 2 just after takeoff, failure of the cockpit crew to raise the landing gear after experiencing the engine anomaly, and execution of remedial actions by the first officer before the attainment of minimum safe altitude. The crew did not follow standard procedures, lacked situational awareness, displayed poor crew resource management, and handled the anomaly unprofessionally.

== Aftermath ==
The crash prompted Eni's chief executive Paolo Scaroni to travel to Pakistan with the head of Eni's exploration and production division, Claudio Descalzi. Dawn reported that the crash was "a reminder of the need to constantly review and enforce air safety protocols in Pakistan", though noted that while the country "has generally had a good air safety record" that this crash happened "while memories of the catastrophic Air Blue crash – the worst aviation disaster in the country's history – are still fresh". The Express Tribune also said the crash evoked memories of the previous crash, noting that the coverage was "reminiscent of that of the Airblue crash" because "soon after the crash, images of the site splashed onto TV screens, with bulletin after bulletin giving detailed coverage, implicit with the promise that this tragedy will be investigated and justice will be done".
