= List of Pakistan International Airlines destinations =

Pakistan International Airlines (PIA), is the flag carrier airline of Pakistan. The airline has its head office on the grounds of Jinnah International Airport in Karachi. Its main bases are Karachi, Lahore and Islamabad/Rawalpindi.

Pakistan International Airlines was set up on 1 March 1955, after Orient Airways merged with the government's proposed new airline. During the same year the airline opened its first international service, from Karachi to Heathrow Airport via Cairo International Airport and Leonardo da Vinci–Fiumicino Airport in Fiumicino, Italy, using three newly acquired Lockheed L-1049C Super Constellations. The DC-3s continued operating the domestic services in Pakistan. In May 1956, PIA ordered two further Super Lockheed Constellations of the latest L-1049H version and five Vickers Viscount 815.

== List ==
Country (province)	City	Airport	Notes	Refs
Afghanistan	Kabul	Kabul International Airport	Terminated	
Afghanistan	Kandahar	Kandahar International Airport	Terminated	
Albania	Tirana	Tirana International Airport Nënë Tereza	Terminated	
Austria	Vienna	Vienna International Airport	Terminated	
Azerbaijan	Baku	Heydar Aliyev International Airport		
Bahrain	Manama	Bahrain International Airport		
Bangladesh	Dhaka	Hazrat Shahjalal International Airport	Terminated	
Canada	Toronto	Toronto Pearson International Airport		
China	Beijing	Beijing Capital International Airport		
China	Chengdu	Chengdu Tianfu International Airport	Terminated	
China	Guangzhou	Guangzhou Baiyun International Airport	Terminated	
China	Kashgar	Kashgar Laining International Airport	Terminated	
China	Shanghai	Shanghai Pudong International Airport	Terminated	
China	Ürümqi	Ürümqi Tianshan International Airport	Terminated	
China	Wuhan	Wuhan Tianhe International Airport	Terminated	
China	Xi'an	Xi'an Xianyang International Airport		
Denmark	Copenhagen	Copenhagen Airport	Terminated	
Egypt	Cairo	Cairo International Airport	Terminated	
France	Paris	Charles de Gaulle Airport		
Germany	Frankfurt	Frankfurt Airport	Terminated	
Greece	Athens	Athens International Airport	Terminated	
Hong Kong	Hong Kong	Hong Kong International Airport	Terminated	
Hong Kong	Hong Kong	Kai Tak Airport	Airport closed	
India	Delhi	Indira Gandhi International Airport	Terminated	
India	Kolkata	Netaji Subhas Chandra Bose International Airport	Terminated	
India	Mumbai	Chhatrapati Shivaji Maharaj International Airport	Terminated	
Indonesia	Jakarta	Soekarno–Hatta International Airport	Terminated	
Iran	Mashhad	Mashhad International Airport	Terminated	
Iran	Tehran	Tehran Mehrabad International Airport	Terminated	
Iran	Zahedan	Zahedan Airport	Terminated	
Iraq	Baghdad	Baghdad International Airport	Terminated	
Iraq	Najaf	Al Najaf International Airport	Terminated	
Italy	Milan	Milan Malpensa Airport	Terminated	
Italy	Rome	Rome Fiumicino Airport	Terminated	
Japan	Tokyo	Narita International Airport	Terminated	
Jordan	Amman	Queen Alia International Airport	Terminated	
Kazakhstan	Almaty	Almaty International Airport	Terminated	
Kazakhstan	Astana	Nursultan Nazarbayev International Airport	Terminated	
Kenya	Nairobi	Jomo Kenyatta International Airport	Codeshare with Kenya Airways	
Kuwait	Kuwait City	Kuwait International Airport		
Kyrgyzstan	Bishkek	Manas International Airport	Terminated	
Lebanon	Beirut	Beirut–Rafic Hariri International Airport	Terminated	
Libya	Tripoli	Tripoli International Airport	Airport closed	
Maldives	Malé	Velana International Airport	Terminated	
Malaysia	Kuala Lumpur	Kuala Lumpur International Airport		
Myanmar	Yangon	Yangon International Airport	Terminated	
Nepal	Kathmandu	Tribhuvan International Airport	Terminated	
Netherlands	Amsterdam	Amsterdam Airport Schiphol	Terminated	
Nigeria	Kano	Kano International Airport	Terminated	
Norway	Oslo	Oslo Airport, Gardermoen	Terminated	
Oman	Muscat	Muscat International Airport		
Oman	Salalah	Salalah International Airport	Terminated	
Pakistan	Mirpur	Mirpur Aerodrome	Terminated	
Pakistan	Muzaffarabad	Muzaffarabad Airport	Terminated	
Pakistan	Rawalakot	Rawalakot Airport	Terminated	
Pakistan	Dalbandin	Dalbandin Airport	Terminated	
Pakistan	Gwadar	New Gwadar International Airport	Hub	
Pakistan	Gwadar	Gwadar International Airport	Airport closed	
Pakistan	Jiwani	Jiwani Airport	Terminated	
Pakistan	Khuzdar	Khuzdar Airport	Terminated	
Pakistan	Ormara	Ormara Airport	Terminated	
Pakistan	Panjgur	Panjgur Airport	Terminated	
Pakistan	Pasni	Pasni Airport	Terminated	
Pakistan	Quetta	Quetta International Airport	Focus city	
Pakistan	Sibi	Sibi Airport	Terminated	
Pakistan	Sui	Sui Airport	Terminated	
Pakistan	Turbat	Turbat International Airport		
Pakistan	Zhob	Zhob Airport	Terminated	
Pakistan	Gilgit	Gilgit Airport		
Pakistan	Skardu	Skardu International Airport	Hub	
Pakistan	Islamabad	Benazir Bhutto International Airport	Airport closed	
Pakistan	Islamabad	Islamabad International Airport	Hub	
Pakistan	Abbottabad	Abbottabad Airport	Terminated	
Pakistan	Bannu	Bannu Airport	Terminated	
Pakistan	Chitral	Chitral Airport		
Pakistan	Dera Ismail Khan	Dera Ismail Khan Airport		
Pakistan	Kohat	Kohat Airport	Terminated	
Pakistan	Parachinar	Parachinar Airport	Terminated	
Pakistan	Peshawar	Bacha Khan International Airport	Hub	
Pakistan	Saidu Sharif	Saidu Sharif Airport	Terminated	
Pakistan	Tarbela	Tarbela Dam Airport	Terminated	
Pakistan	Bahawalpur	Bahawalpur Airport		
Pakistan	Bhurban	Bhurban Aerodrome	Terminated	
Pakistan	Dera Ghazi Khan	Dera Ghazi Khan International Airport		
Pakistan	Faisalabad	Faisalabad International Airport	Focus city	
Pakistan	Lahore	Allama Iqbal International Airport	Hub	
Pakistan	Mangla	Mangla Airport	Terminated	
Pakistan	Mianwali	Mianwali Airport	Terminated	
Pakistan	Multan	Multan International Airport	Focus city	
Pakistan	Rahim Yar Khan	Shaikh Zayed International Airport		
Pakistan	Sargodha	Sargodha Airbase	Terminated	
Pakistan	Sialkot	Sialkot International Airport	Focus city	
Pakistan	Sialkot	Sialkot Cantonment Airport	Terminated	
Pakistan	Jacobabad	Jacobabad Airbase	Terminated	
Pakistan	Karachi	Jinnah International Airport	Hub	
Pakistan	Hyderabad	Hyderabad Airport	Terminated	
Pakistan	Mirpur Khas	Mirpur Khas Airport	Terminated	
Pakistan	Mohenjo-daro	Moenjodaro Airport	Terminated	
Pakistan	Nawabshah	Nawabshah Airport	Terminated	
Pakistan	Sehwan Sharif	Sehwan Sharif Airport	Terminated	
Pakistan	Sindhri	Sindhri Airport	Terminated	
Pakistan	Sukkur	Sukkur Airport		
Philippines	Manila	Ninoy Aquino International Airport	Terminated	
Qatar	Doha	Doha International Airport	Airport closed	
Qatar	Doha	Hamad International Airport		
Russia	Moscow	Sheremetyevo International Airport	Terminated	
Saudi Arabia	Dammam	King Fahd International Airport		
Saudi Arabia	Dhahran	Dhahran International Airport	Airport closed	
Saudi Arabia	Gassim	Prince Naif bin Abdulaziz International Airport		
Saudi Arabia	Jeddah	King Abdulaziz International Airport		
Saudi Arabia	Medina	Prince Mohammad bin Abdulaziz International Airport		
Saudi Arabia	Riyadh	King Khalid International Airport		
Saudi Arabia	Taif	Taif International Airport	Terminated	
Singapore	Singapore	Changi Airport	Terminated	
Spain	Barcelona	Josep Tarradellas Barcelona–El Prat Airport	Terminated	
Sri Lanka	Colombo	Bandaranaike International Airport	Terminated	
Switzerland	Geneva	Geneva Airport	Terminated	
Switzerland	Zurich	Zurich Airport	Terminated	
Syria	Damascus	Damascus International Airport	Terminated	
Tanzania	Dar es Salaam	Julius Nyerere International Airport	Terminated	
Tanzania	Kilimanjaro	Kilimanjaro International Airport	Terminated	
Thailand	Bangkok	Don Mueang International Airport	Terminated	
Thailand	Bangkok	Suvarnabhumi Airport	Terminated	
Turkey	Ankara	Ankara Esenboğa Airport	Terminated	
Turkey	Istanbul	Atatürk Airport	Airport closed	
Turkey	Istanbul	Istanbul Airport	Terminated	
Turkmenistan	Ashgabat	Ashgabat International Airport	Terminated	
United Arab Emirates	Abu Dhabi	Zayed International Airport		
United Arab Emirates	Al Ain	Al Ain International Airport		
United Arab Emirates	Dubai	Dubai International Airport		
United Arab Emirates	Fujairah	Fujairah International Airport	Terminated	
United Arab Emirates	Ras Al Khaimah	Ras Al Khaimah International Airport	Terminated	
United Arab Emirates	Sharjah	Sharjah International Airport		
United Kingdom	Birmingham	Birmingham Airport	Resumes 1 December 2026	
United Kingdom	Glasgow	Glasgow Airport	Terminated	
United Kingdom	Leeds/Bradford	Leeds Bradford Airport	Terminated	
United Kingdom	London	Heathrow Airport		
United Kingdom	London	London Stansted Airport	Terminated	
United Kingdom	Manchester	Manchester Airport		
United States	Chicago	Chicago O'Hare International Airport	Terminated	
United States	Houston	George Bush Intercontinental Airport	Terminated	
United States	New York City	John F. Kennedy International Airport	Terminated	
United States	Washington, D.C.	Washington Dulles International Airport	Terminated	
Uzbekistan	Tashkent	Tashkent International Airport	Terminated	
Yemen	Aden	Aden International Airport	Terminated	
Yemen	Sanaa	Sanaa International Airport	Terminated	

Until 1971, PIA also served various places as domestic stations in what was East Pakistan. During the COVID-19 pandemic in 2020, the PIA operated a series of chartered flights to and from Australia, South Africa, South Korea, the UK and the Middle East among others to transport stranded citizens. On 30 June 2020, the European Air Safety Agency banned PIA from operating in Europe for six months. On 29 November 2024, the European Air Safety Agency permitted PIA to start operating in Europe. On 24 October 2025, PIA appearsed on the CAA UK Third Country Operators List (1364). On 6 October 2025, Manchester Airport announced a new PIA route from Manchester to Islamabad from 25 October 2025.
