= Lahore Area Control Centre =

- IATA: none; ICAO: OPLR

Summary
- Coordinates: 31.3117°N 74.2412°E

Map
- Location of Lahore Area Control Centre

Lahore Area Control Centre is one of three Area Control Centers in Pakistan operated by the Pakistan Civil Aviation Authority and based at Allama Iqbal International Airport in Lahore. Lahore ACC air traffic controllers provide en route and terminal control services to aircraft in the Lahore Flight Information Region (FIR). The Lahore FIR airspace covers Pakistani airspace between the 30° North to 37° North. To the south is the Karachi FIR. To the north is the Urumqi FIR. To the east is the Delhi FIR. To the west is the Kabul FIR.

== Sectors ==
Lahore ACC is divided into three control sectors:

- Lahore Sector East
- Lahore Sector West
- Lahore Sector South

== Services ==
Lahore ACC is equipped with Indra's Aircon 2100 radar system. and provides air traffic control services to all air traffic and its airspace. It also expedites sequencing of arrivals and departures along STARs (Standard Terminal Arrival Routes) and SIDs (Standard Instrument Departures). Certain exceptions include military airspace and lower-level airspace controlled by local airport towers and TRACONs, such as Cherat Approach. Lahore ACC is also part of the Bobcat Air Traffic Flow Management program, which helps to optimize traffic flow through Kabul FIR. Due to lower navigation and surveillance capabilities, and limited ATS provision capabilities, Kabul FIR often becomes very congested airspace with limited number of operating routes and flight levels. Whereas the level allocation is made by AeroThai, the primary responsibility for tactical management of level allocation rests with Lahore ACC.

== Airports ==
The Lahore ACC assumes control of the following airports:

- Controlled, IFR/IFR, IFR/VFR and VFR/VFR separation, VFR: Mode C and ATC clearance required
  - Lahore Allama Iqbal International Airport
  - Faisalabad International Airport
  - Multan International Airport
  - Sialkot International Airport
- Controlled, only IFR/IFR spacing
  - Bahawalpur Airport
  - Dera Ghazi Khan International Airport
  - Dera Ismail Khan Airport
  - Rahim Yar Khan Shaikh Zayed International Airport
- Uncontrolled, clearances are required to enter or leave airspace.
  - Chashma Airport
  - Parachinar Airport
  - Zhob Airport

== See also ==
- Karachi Area Control Centre
- Airports of Pakistan
- Civil Aviation Authority
