= Panjgur Airport =

- IATA: PJG; ICAO: OPPG

Summary
- Airport type: Public
- Operator: Pakistan Airports Authority
- Location: Panjgur-93000
- Elevation AMSL: 3,289 ft (1,002 m)
- Coordinates: 26°57′17″N 64°07′57″E
- Interactive map of Panjgur Airport

Runways
Direction	Length		Surface
Direction	ft	m	Surface
13/31	5,000	1,524	Bitumen/Asphalt

Statistics (2016-17)
- Passengers: 8,750
- Passenger change: ▼25%
- Aircraft movements: 238

Panjgur Airport (IATA: PJG, ICAO: OPPG) is a domestic and partially international airport, located at Panjgur, Balochistan, Pakistan.

The airport at times receives special flights from UAE, with members of the Emirates' royal family, who have a palace in Piry Jhalak in Panjgur.

== Airlines and Destinations ==
Airlines	Destinations
Abu Dhabi Aviation	Charter: Abu Dhabi-Al Bateen
South Air	Multan, Peshawar, Karachi

== Accidents and Incidents ==
- On November 10, 2018, Pakistan International Airlines Flight 517 skidded off Runway 31 at Panjgur after it landed very far from the touchdown zone past the taxiway that leads to the airport's tarmac. Nobody was injured. The final report then revealed the flight crew had dubious licenses.

== See also ==
- List of airports in Pakistan
- Airlines of Pakistan
- Transport in Pakistan
- Pakistan Civil Aviation Authority
