= Sibi Airport =

- IATA: SBQ; ICAO: OPSB

Summary
- Airport type: Public
- Operator: Pakistan Airports Authority
- Serves: Sibi-82000, Balochistan, Pakistan
- Elevation AMSL: 436 ft (133 m)
- Coordinates: 29°34′28″N 067°50′35″E
- Interactive map of Sibi Airport

Runways
| Direction | Length | | Surface |
| Direction | m | ft | Surface |
|---|---|---|---|
| 13/31 | 1,829 | 6,000 | Gravel |

Sibi Airport (IATA: SBQ, ICAO: OPSB) is a domestic airport located at Sibi, a city in the Balochistan province of Pakistan.

== History ==
Pakistan International Airlines operated flights to the airport until the late 1980s using turboprop Fokker F-27 aircraft from Karachi and Quetta. However the route was dropped in the mid-1990s. PIA still maintains a passenger and cargo booking office in Sibi City.

In 2007, the Pakistan Air Force used Sibi Airport as a base camp for relief operations in Balochistan.

== Structure ==
A Civil Aviation Authority tender was issued on 9 March 2009, requiring the runway of the airport to be repaired.

== See also ==
- List of airports in Pakistan
- Airlines of Pakistan
- Transport in Pakistan
- Pakistan Civil Aviation Authority
