= Dera Ismail Khan Airport =

- IATA: DSK; ICAO: OPDI

Summary
- Airport type: Public
- Operator: Pakistan Airports Authority
- Serves: Dera Ismail Khan-29050, Khyber-Pakhtunkhwa
- Opened: 2025
- Elevation AMSL: 594 ft (181 m)
- Coordinates: 31°54′33″N 070°53′47″E
- Interactive map of Dera Ismail Khan Airport

Runways
Direction	Length		Surface
Direction	m	ft	Surface
12/30	1,524	5,000	Asphalt
- Source: DAFIF

Dera Ismail Khan Airport or D. I. Khan Airport (IATA: DSK, ICAO: OPDI) is an airport situated 10 km away from the city centre of Dera Ismail Khan, a city in Khyber Pakhtunkhwa province of Pakistan. This is the only airport, besides Bannu Airport, that provide aerial connections for the southern districts of Khyber Pakhtunkhwa with other parts of the country. The airport operations have remained suspended for a long time for various reasons. In May 2026, Dera Ismail Kham airport’s rehabilitation was completed and a proving flight also landed at D.I Khan Airport by the Pakistan Army Aviation Corps.

== History ==
Dera Ismail Khan airport was closed following the start of the Afghan-US war in 2001 for unspecified reasons. After six years, a plan to reopen the airport was made when a delegation from the district visited Islamabad. The reopening was stated to cost around Rs 4 million, which was spent on repairing the runway and the renovation and repair of the terminal building. Pakistan International Airlines (PIA) was the sole operator at the airport, providing feeder services between Peshawar, Zhob, Multan, Lahore and Islamabad using Fokker F-27 aircraft. With the reopening plans, the CAA decided to upgrade the airport which would eventually facilitate the initiation of international flights for the people of the area working abroad and the business community.

The first flight was expected to be launched on 27 October 2008 on the sector Quetta - Zhob - Dera Ismail Khan - Peshawar - Islamabad.

However, the efforts to operationalise the airport have taken many years. In mid-2022, the Senate Standing Committee on Aviation was still considering matters related to the revival of the Dera Ismail Khan Airport. The committee was briefed that ‘large flights’ could not land on the airport’s runway, which was especially designed for ATR planes. The body urged the government to ensure that it served the people of Pakistan and “reviving this airport will be a huge service to them”.

Finally, in 2026, the airport was reopened and a proving flight landed in this airport.

== Structure ==
Dera Ismail Khan airport is not as large as most of the other airports in Pakistan, as it caters mainly to the population of Dera Ismail Khan. The airport runway is only suitable for smaller aircraft such as Fokker, Embraer, and ATR. The airport is currently not able to handle larger aircraft such as Boeing and Airbus. There is currently one runway denoted 12 and 30. It is near Chashma Road. Chashma Road starts from Sheikh Yousuf Chowk towards Kokar, Paharpur, and Bilot Sharif and approximately 80 kilometres to Chashma Atomic Plant near Mianwali.

== Airlines and destinations ==
There are currently no airlines serving the airport.

== See also ==
- List of airports in Pakistan
- Airlines of Pakistan
- Transport in Pakistan
- Pakistan Civil Aviation Authority
