= Skardu International Airport =

Airport in Gilgit-Baltistan, Pakistan

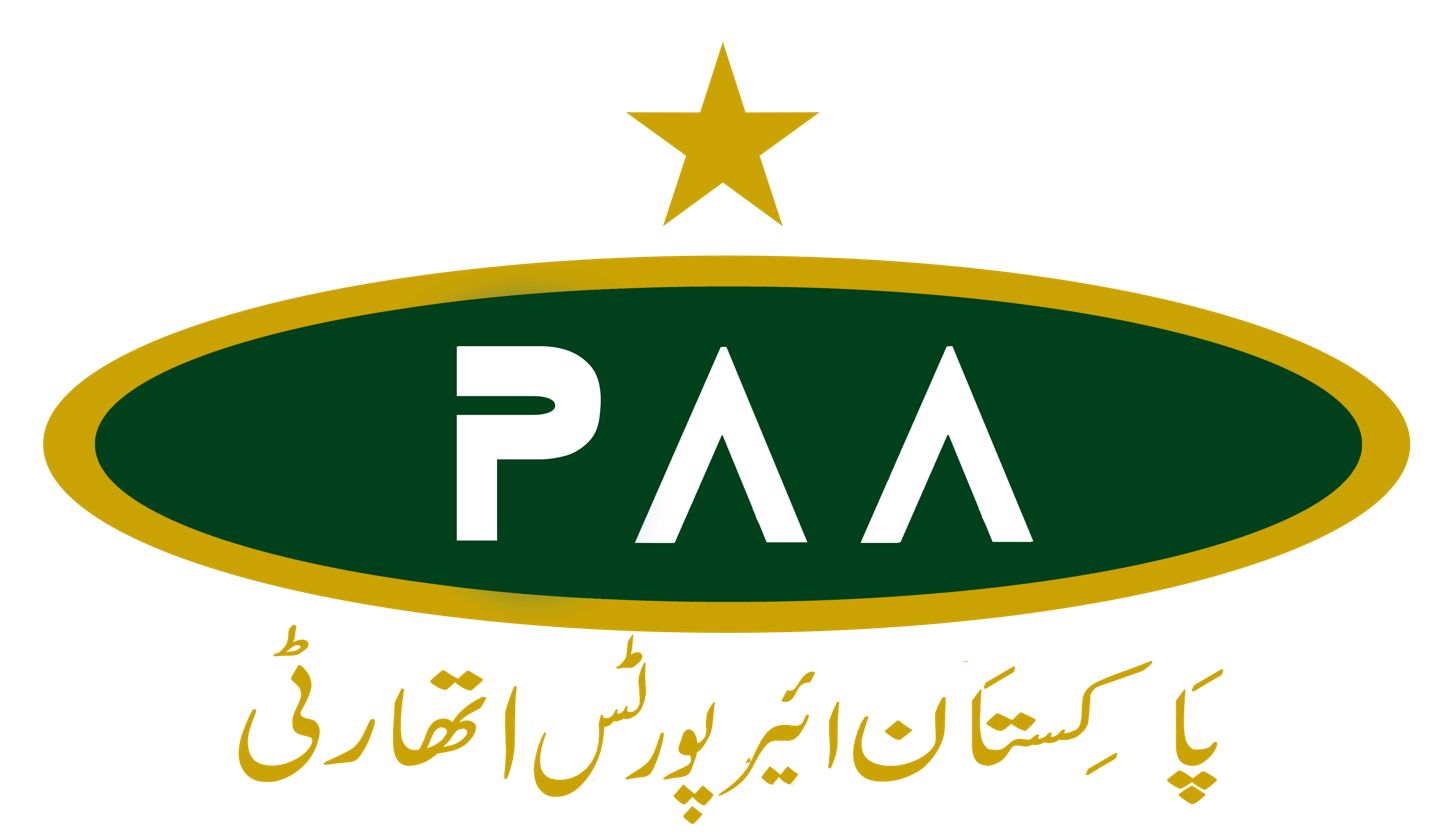
Skardu International Airport سکردو بین الاقوامی ہوائی اڈا

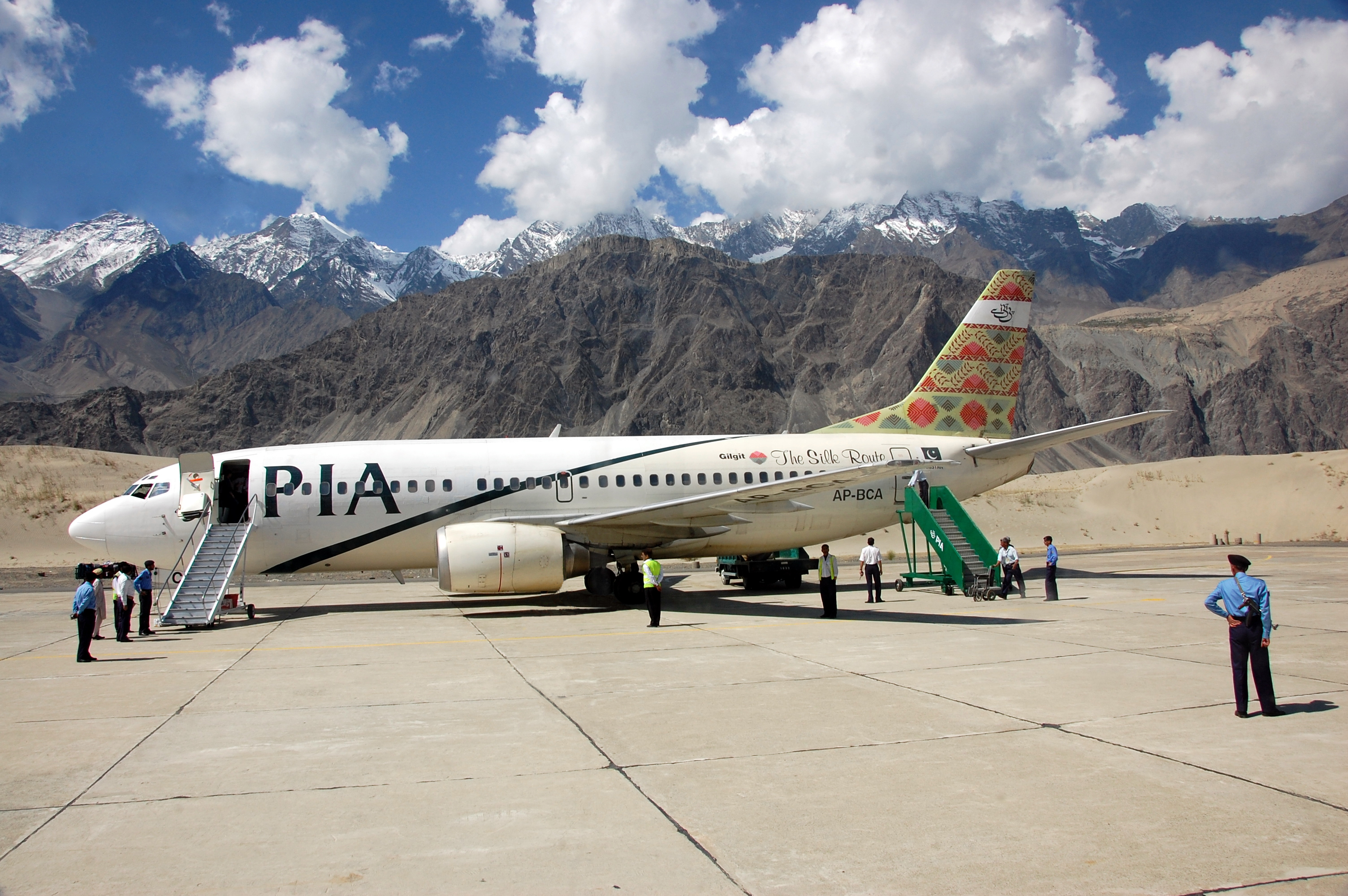
- Pakistan International Airlines Boeing 737-300 at Skardu Airport in 2008
- IATA: KDU; ICAO: OPSD

Summary
- Airport type: Joint-use airport
- Owner: GoP Aviation Division
- Operator: Pakistan Airports Authority
- Serves: Skardu-16100
- Location: Skardu District, Baltistan Division, Gilgit Baltistan, Pakistan
- Hub for: Pakistan International Airlines
- Elevation AMSL: 7,301 ft (2,225 m)
- Coordinates: 35°20′22″N 75°32′29″E
- Website: paa.gov.pk

Maps
- Location of airport in Pakistan OPSD (Pakistan) OPSD (South Asia)
- Location in Skardu

Runways
Direction	Length		Surface
Direction	ft	m	Surface
14L/32R	11,995	3,656	Bitumen
14R/32L	11,995	3,656	Bitumen
1̶3̶/3̶3̶	8̶5̶0̶0̶	2̶5̶9̶0̶	B̶i̶t̶u̶m̶e̶n̶

Statistics (July 2024 – June 2025)
- Passengers: 179,454 ▲22.53%
- Aircraft movements: 1,228 ▲16.50%
- Cargo: 243 metric tons ▲46.09%
- Source: Statistics from the Pakistan Civil Aviation Authority

Skardu International Airport (IATA: KDU, ICAO: OPSD) is an international airport located on the outskirts of Skardu 9.2 km (5.7 mi) from the city center, and serves the Skardu District. It is the busiest airport in Pakistan's Gilgit-Baltistan region. It is adjacent to Qadri airbase, a Pakistan Air Force (FOB) which shares the main runway with the airport.

== History ==
Skardu Airport was initially built as an airbase in 1949, following Pakistan's independence and served as an airfield for the Pakistan Air Force in the Northern Areas. It was converted into a domestic airport for civilian use, alongside military use. On 2 December 2021, Skardu Airport was designated and re-inaugurated as an international airport after providing upgrades to the airport to become a tourism hub for Gilgit-Baltistan.

It was reported in June 2025 that the government had initiated a project for Rs. 180 million (equivalent to Rs. 920 million or US$3.3 million in 2021) upgrade of Skardu International Airport, to improve air connectivity and support economic development in Gilgit-Baltistan.

== Runways ==
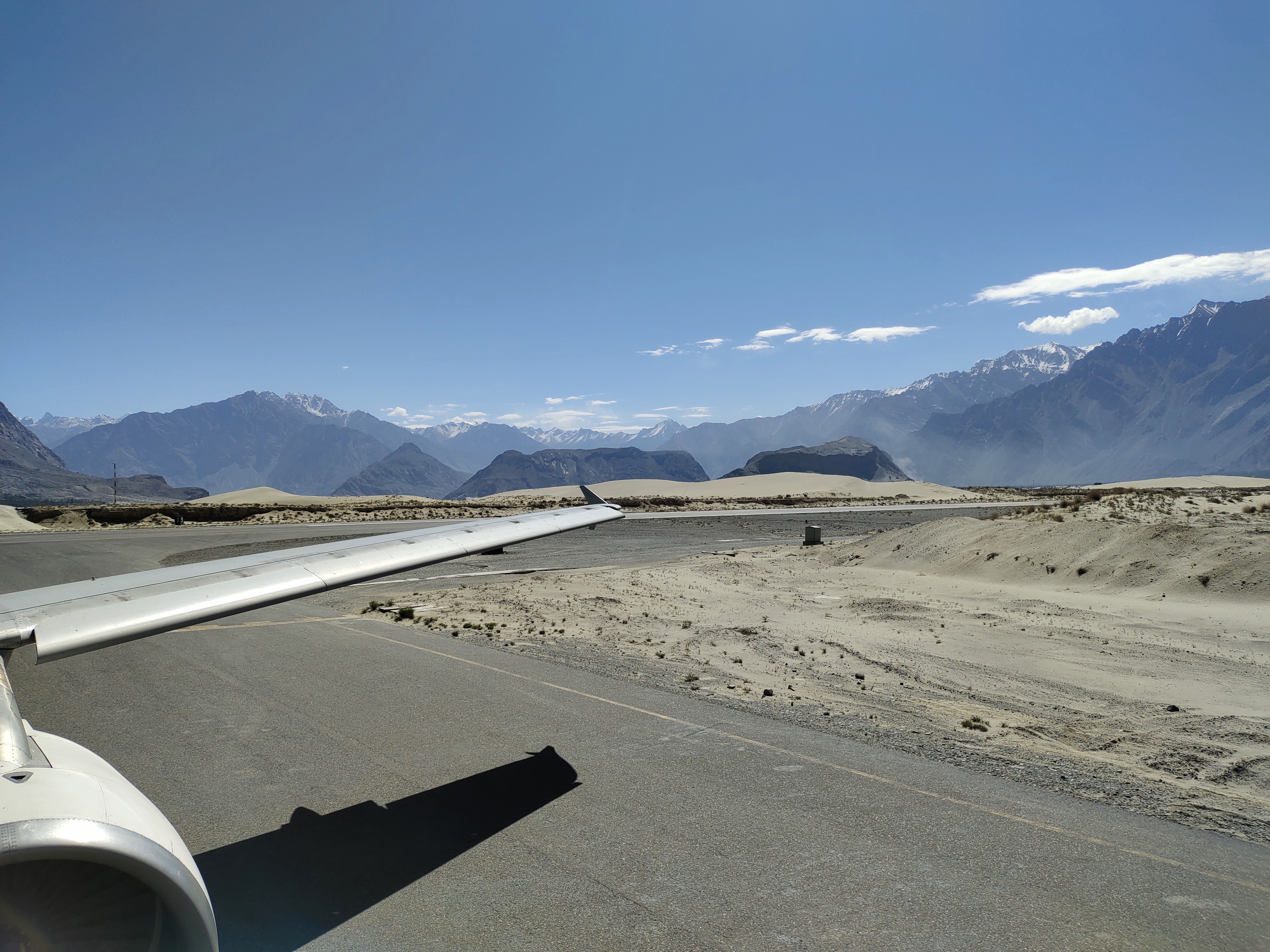
Skardu International Airport

Skardu Airport has two asphalt runways, both 11,944 ft (3,641 m) long. A third 8,740 ft (2,664 m) long asphalt runway, Runway 15/33, was de-commissioned in December 2021.

== Airlines and destinations ==
For an extended period, the airport handled only one or two flights. Following its designation as an international airport, flight operations reportedly increased to approximately eight to ten flights. The airport Skardu Airport is connected to Pakistan's capital, Islamabad, through regular Pakistan International Airlines flights, as well as through flights to Lahore, Multan, Faisalabad, Sialkot and Karachi.

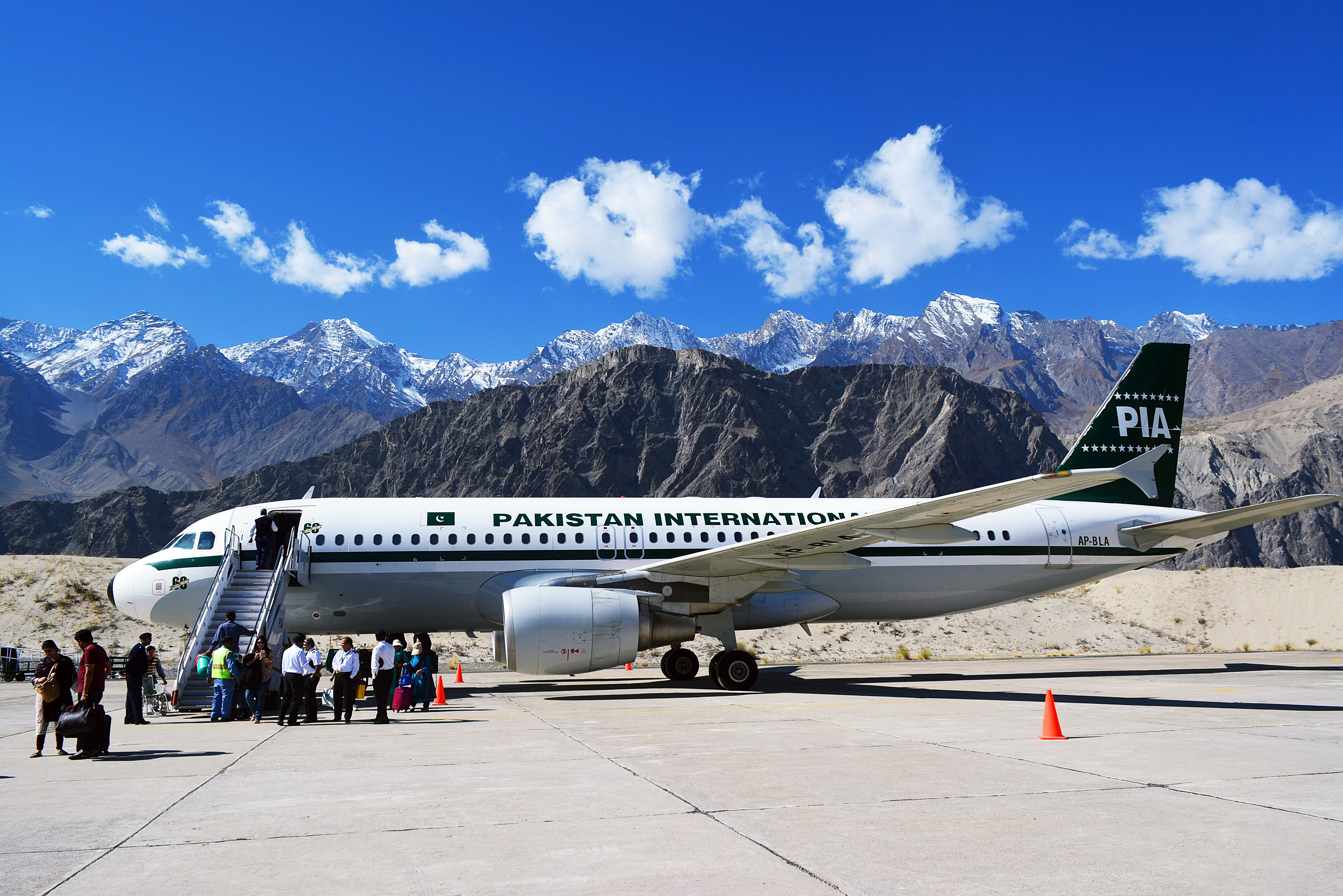
Pakistan International Airlines Airbus A320-200-214 at Skardu Airport on 6 October 2015

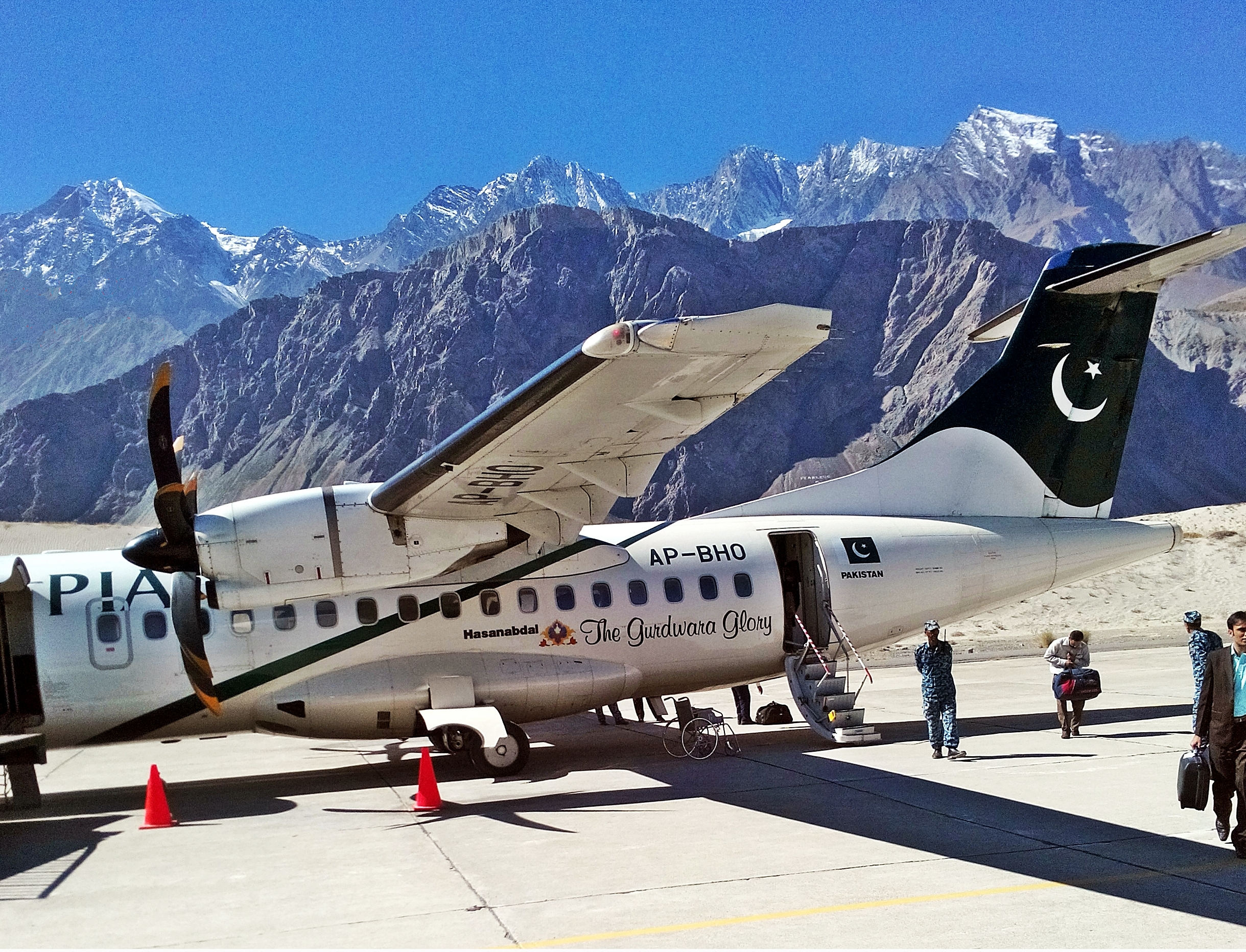
Pakistan International Airlines ATR 42-500 registration AP-BHO taxiing at Skardu Airport on 21 October 2013.

Flydubai has submitted a request to start international operations to and from Skardu Airport, which could potentially become the first foreign airline to start international flights from Skardu. On 14 August 2023, the first international flight operated by Pakistan International Airlines from Dubai landed at the airport, the direct connection has been continued as a seasonal flight service in May 2025.

Airlines	Destinations
Airblue	Islamabad, Lahore
Pakistan International Airlines	Dubai–International, Islamabad, Karachi, Lahore
AirSial	Islamabad

== Statistics ==
Annual traffic statistics at Skardu
Year	Passengers handled (Note: Number of passengers including domestic, international)	
Year	Numbers	% change
2020	15,486	
2021	344,385	▲2223.84
2022	317,764	▼7.73
2023	244,118	▼23.18
2024	369,733	▲51.45

== See also ==
- Gilgit Airport
- Chilas Airfield
- List of airports in Pakistan
- Pakistan Civil Aviation Authority
- Airlines of Pakistan
