= List of airports in Pakistan =

Airports in Pakistan
- Hub airport
- International airport
- Domestic airport

Pakistan has a total of 25 airports, including three major hubs in Karachi, Islamabad, and Lahore. Six additional medium-sized airports are located in Peshawar, Multan, Sialkot, Faisalabad, Quetta, and Sukkur, while the remaining are classified as smaller airports.

Most civil airports in Pakistan are operated by the Pakistan Civil Aviation Authority. However, Sialkot International Airport, owned by the Sialkot Chamber of Commerce and Industry, stands out as Pakistan's first privately owned airport, also the first of its kind in South Asia, and is open to both domestic and international flights. Military airbases are primarily managed by the Pakistan Air Force, except for the Dhamial and Tarbela Army Aviation Airbases, which are under the Pakistan Army's jurisdiction and Faisal Airbase, Karachi which is being managed in partnership with Pakistan Navy, the naval air arm of the Pakistan military.

== Gallery ==
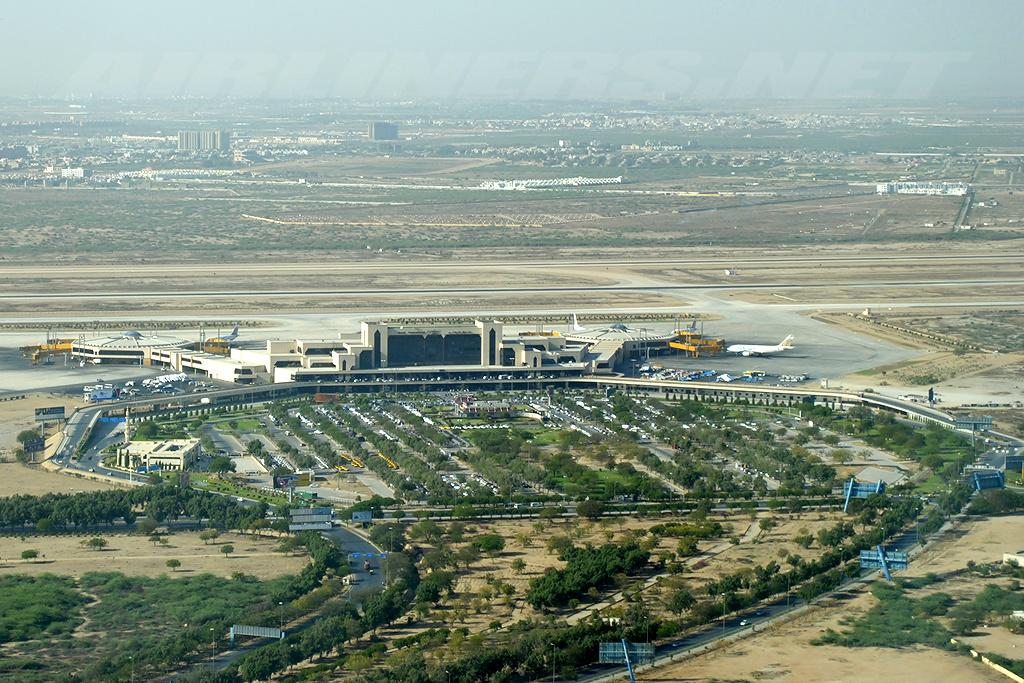
Jinnah International Airport in Karachi

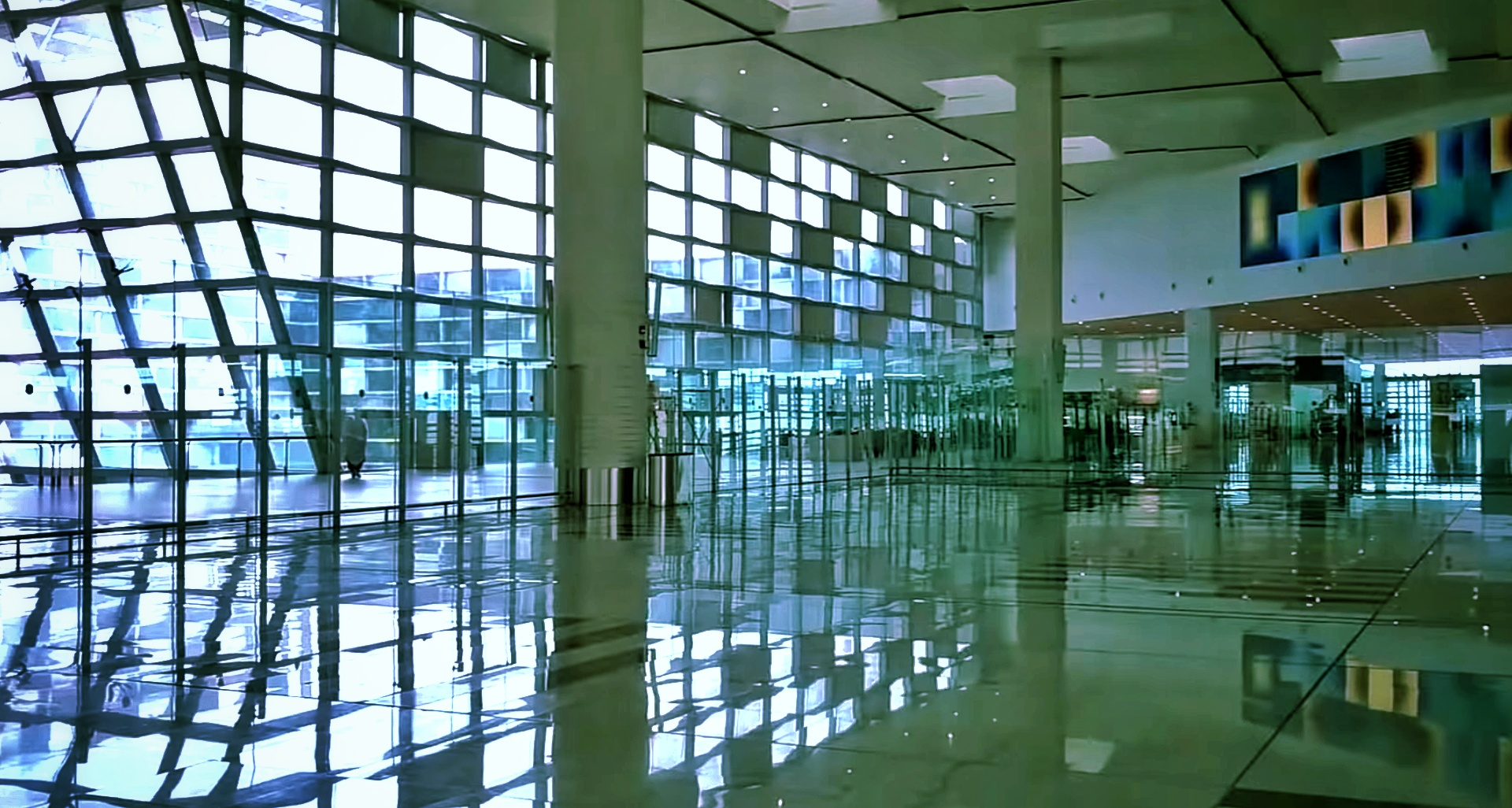
Islamabad International Airport Terminal

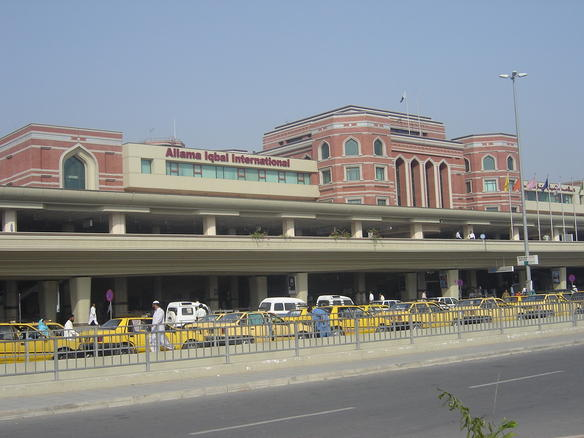
Allama Iqbal International Airport in Lahore

Multan International Airport

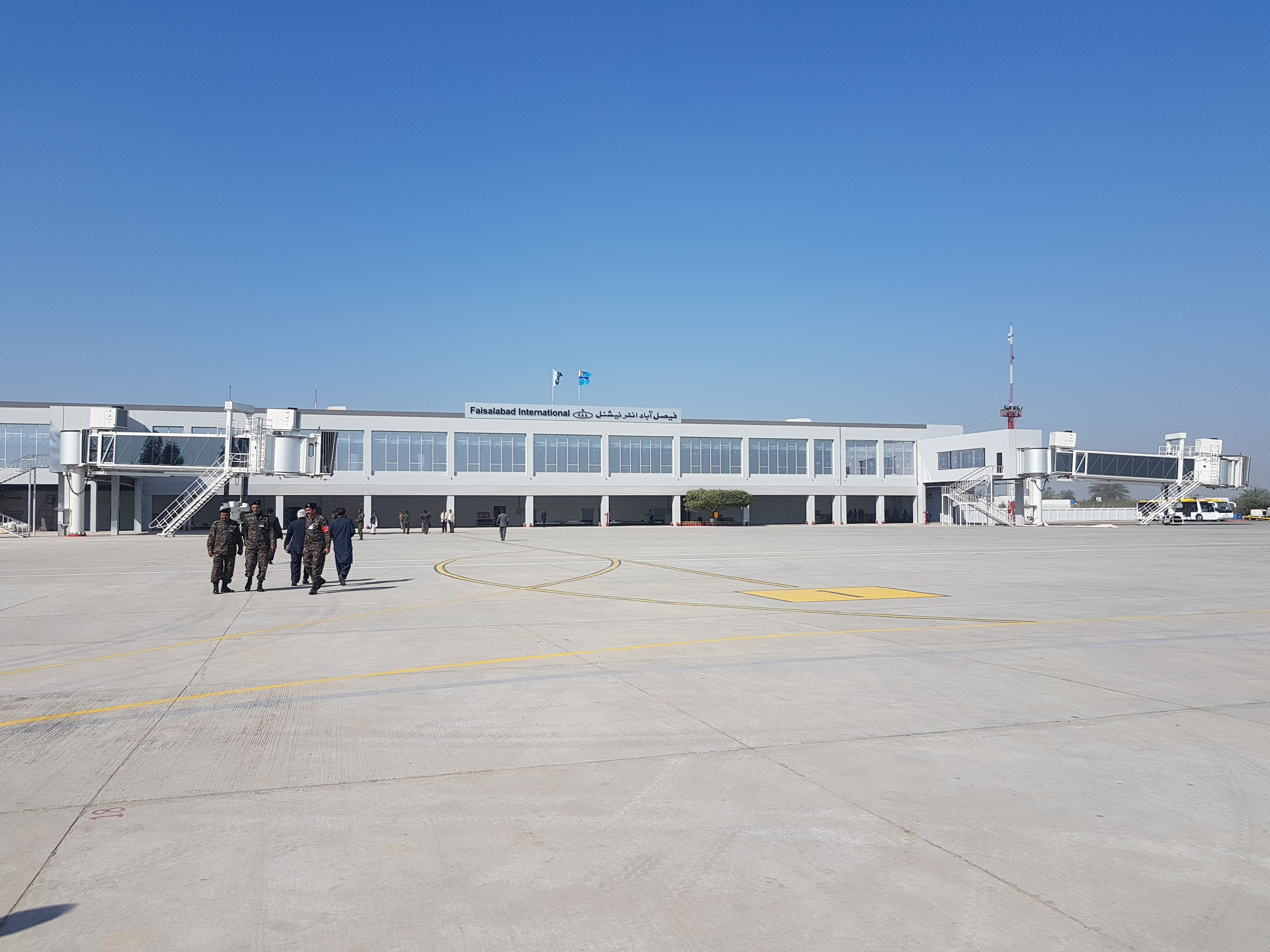
Faisalabad International Airport Terminal

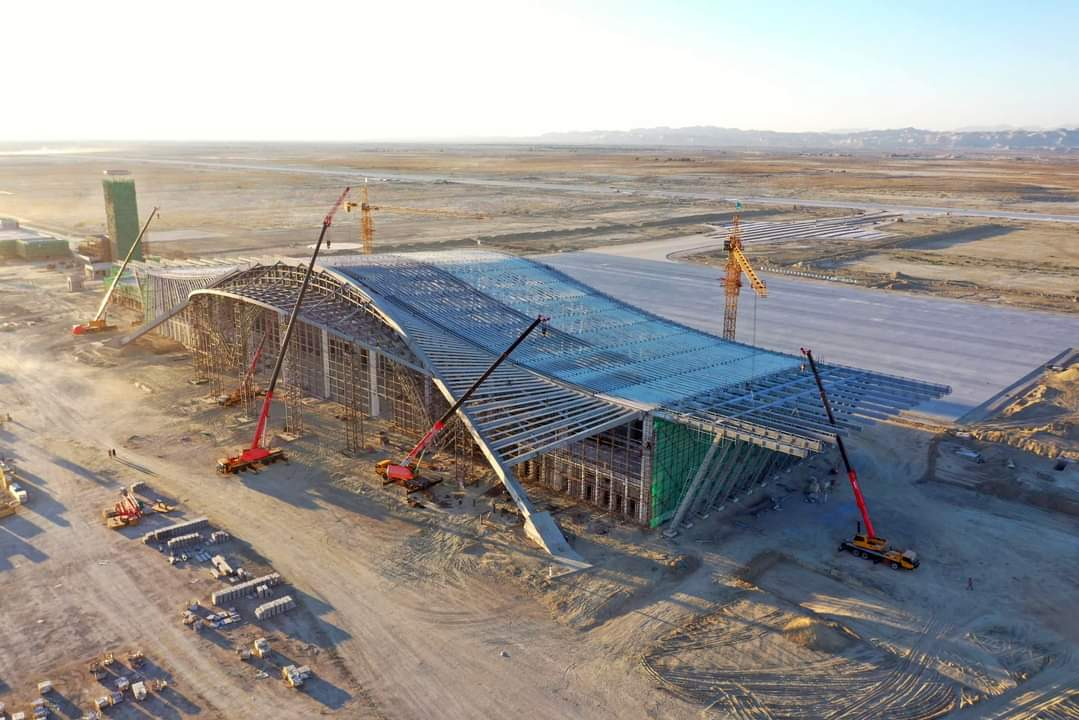
New Gwadar International Airport

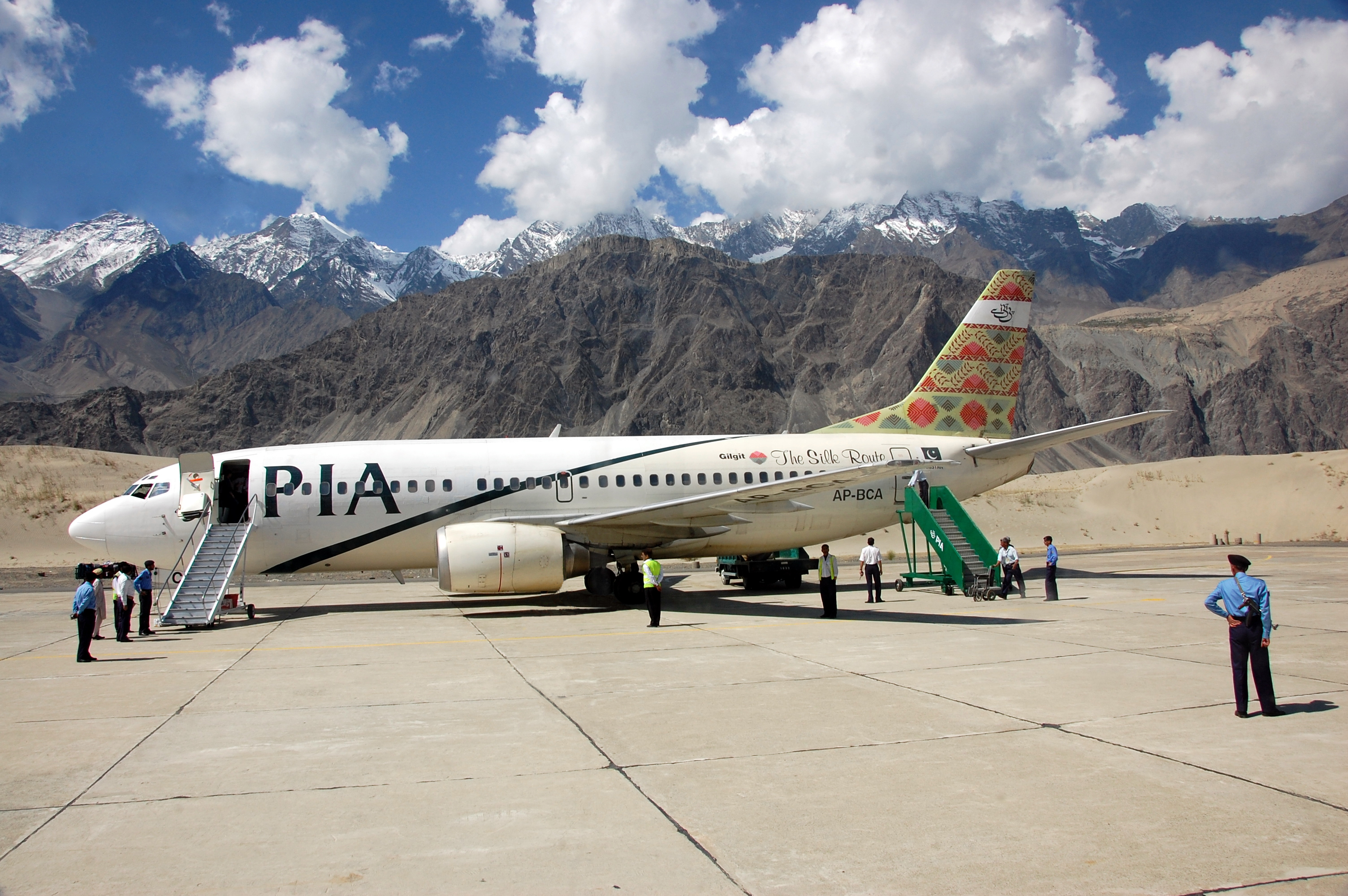
A former PIA Boeing 737-300 at Skardu International Airport

== Civilian list ==
Names shown in bold indicate the airport has scheduled service on commercial airlines.

Civil airports
ICAO	Airport name	IATA	City	Province/territory	Usage	Coordinates
**Primary international airports**
OPIS	**Islamabad International Airport**	ISB	Islamabad-Rawalpindi	ICT-Islamabad Capital Territory	Public	33°33′56.7″N 72°49′32.34″E
OPKC	**Karachi Jinnah International Airport**	KHI	Karachi	Sindh	Public	24°54′24″N 067°09′39″E
OPLA	**Lahore Allama Iqbal International Airport**	LHE	Lahore	Punjab	Public	31°31′17″N 074°24′14″E
**Secondary international airports**
OPDG	Dera Ghazi Khan International Airport	DEA	Dera Ghazi Khan	Punjab	Public	29°57′39″N 070°29′09″E
OPFA	**Faisalabad International Airport**	LYP	Faisalabad	Punjab	Public	31°21′54″N 072°59′41″E
OPGD	New Gwadar International Airport	GWD	Gwadar	Balochistan	Public	25°17′51″N 062°30′03″E
OPGD	**Multan International Airport**	MUX	Multan	South Punjab	Public	30°12′12″N 071°25′09″E
OPPS	**Peshawar Bacha Khan International Airport**	PEW	Peshawar	Khyber Pakhtunkhwa	Public	33°59′38″N 071°30′53″E
OPQT	**Quaid-e-Azam International Airport**	UET	Quetta	Balochistan	Public	30°14′24″N 066°56′24″E
OPRK	Shaikh Zayed International Airport	RYK	Rahim Yar Khan	Punjab	Public	28°23′02″N 070°16′47″E
OPST	**Sialkot International Airport**	SKT	Sialkot	Punjab	Public	32°32′08″N 074°21′50″E
OPSK	**Begum Nusrat Bhutto International Airport Sukkur**	SKZ	Sukkur	Sindh	Public	27°43′19″N 068°47′30″E
OPTU	**Turbat International Airport**	TUK	Turbat	Balochistan	Public	
OPSD	**Skardu International Airport**	KDU	Skardu	Gilgit-Baltistan	Public	35°20′08″N 075°32′10″E
**Domestic airports**
OPAB	Abbottabad Airport		Abbottabad	Khyber Pakhtunkhwa	Public	34°09′N 073°13′E
OPBN	Bannu Airport	BNP	Bannu	Khyber Pakhtunkhwa	Public	32°58′19″N 070°31′27″E
OPBW	Bahawalpur Airport	BHV	Bahawalpur	Punjab	Public	29°20′53″N 071°43′04″E
	Chashma Airport		Chashma	Punjab	VVIP	32°25′28″N 071°27′30″E
OPCL	Chilas Airport	CHB	Chilas	Gilgit-Baltistan	Public	35°25′37″N 074°05′06″E
OPCH	**Chitral Airport**	CJL	Chitral	Khyber Pakhtunkhwa	Public	35°52′54″N 071°47′53″E
OPDB	Dalbandin Airport	DBA	Dalbandin	Balochistan	Public	28°52′30″N 064°24′16″E
OPDI	Dera Ismail Khan Airport	DSK	Dera Ismail Khan	Khyber Pakhtunkhwa	Public	31°54′33″N 070°53′47″E
OPGT	**Gilgit Airport**	GIL	Gilgit	Gilgit-Baltistan	Public	35°55′07″N 074°20′01″E
	Gujrat Airport	GRT	Gujrat	Punjab	Public non-commercial	32°37′44″N 74°03′59″E
OPKD	Hyderabad Airport	HDD	Hyderabad	Sindh	Public	25°19′06″N 068°22′00″E
OPJA	Jacobabad Airport / PAF Base Shahbaz	JAG	Jacobabad	Sindh	Public / military	28°17′03″N 068°26′59″E
OPJI	Jiwani Airport	JIW	Jiwani	Balochistan	Public	25°04′04″N 061°48′20″E
OPKW	Kadanwari Airport	KCF	Kadanwari gas field	Sindh	Private	27°12′23″N 069°09′23″E
OPKH	Khuzdar Airport	KDD	Khuzdar	Balochistan	Public	27°47′40″N 066°38′25″E
OPLH	Walton Airport		Lahore	Punjab	Public	31°29′41″N 074°20′46″E
	Mai Bakhtawar International Airport(under construction)		Islamkot	Sindh	Public	24°50′50″N 70°05′47″E
OPMA	Mangla Airport	XJM	Mangla	Azad Kashmir	Public / military	33°03′00″N 073°38′18″E
OPMJ	Moenjodaro Airport	MJD	Mohenjo-daro	Sindh	Public	27°20′07″N 068°08′35″E
OPMF	Muzaffarabad Airport	MFG	Muzaffarabad	Azad Kashmir	Public	34°20′21″N 073°30′31″E
OPNH	Benazirabad Airport	WNS	Nawabshah	Sindh	Public	26°13′10″N 068°23′24″E
OPOR	Ormara Airport/Naval Air Station Ormara	ORW	Ormara	Balochistan	Public	25°16′29″N 064°35′10″E
OPPG	Panjgur Airport	PJG	Panjgur	Balochistan	Public	26°57′17″N 064°07′57″E
OPPC	Parachinar Airport	PAJ	Parachinar	Khyber Pakhtunkhwa	Public	33°54′10″N 070°04′17″E
OPPI	Pasni Airport	PSI	Pasni City	Balochistan	Public / military	25°17′26″N 063°20′43″E
OPRT	Rawalakot Airport	RAZ	Rawalakot	Azad Kashmir	Public	33°50′59″N 073°47′54″E
OPSS	Saidu Sharif Airport	SDT	Saidu Sharif	Khyber Pakhtunkhwa	Public	34°48′48″N 072°21′10″E
OPSW	Sawan Airport	RZS	Sawan Gas Field	Sindh	Private	26°57′34″N 068°52′26″E
OPSN	Sehwan Sharif Airport	SYW	Sehwan Sharif	Sindh	Public	26°28′23″N 067°43′02″E
OPSB	Sibi Airport	SBQ	Sibi	Balochistan	Public	29°34′28″N 067°50′35″E
OPMP	Sindhri Airport	MPD	Sindhri	Sindh	Public	25°41′02.6″N 069°04′30.9″E
OP35	Juzzak Airport		Juzzak	Balochistan	Public / military	29°02′27″N 061°38′51″E
OPSU	Sui Airport	SUL	Sui	Balochistan	Public	28°38′43″N 069°10′37″E
OPTA	Tarbela Dam Airport	TLB	Tarbela Dam	Khyber Pakhtunkhwa	Public	33°59′10″N 072°36′41″E
OPZB	Zhob Airport	PZH	Zhob	Balochistan	Public	31°21′30″N 069°27′49″E
	Mansehra Airport	HRA	Mansehra	Khyber Pakhtunkhwa	Public	

== Military list ==
Main article (list of airbases in pakistan)

Military airports
City	Province/territory	ICAO	IATA	Airport name	Usage	Coordinates
Chandhar	Punjab			Chandhar Air Force Base	Military	32°04′40″N 73°47′25″E
Gujranwala	Punjab			Pakistan Military Airfield Rahwali	Military	32°14'27.0"N 74°07'58.6"E
Jacobabad	Sindh	OPJA	JAG	PAF Base Shahbaz	Military	28°17′03″N 68°26′58″E
Jhelum	Punjab			Gurha Salim Airport	Military	32°52′44″N 73°36′16″E
Kamra, Attock	Punjab	OPMS		PAF Base Minhas (Kamra Air Base)	Military	33°52′08″N 72°24′03″E
Karachi	Sindh	OPSF		PAF Base Faisal	Military	24°52′42″N 67°06′56″E
Karachi	Sindh	OPMR		PAF Base Masroor (Karachi Air Base)	Military	24°53′37″N 66°56′20″E
Kohat	Khyber Pakhtunkhwa	OPKT	OHT	PAF Base Kohat	Military	33°34′14″N 71°26′22″E
Mianwali	Punjab	OPMI	MWD	PAF Base M.M. Alam	Military	32°33′47″N 71°34′15″E
Murid	Punjab			PAF Base Murid	Military	32°54′36″N 72°46′26″E
Peshawar	Khyber Pakhtunkhwa			PAF Base Peshawar	Military	33°59′39.84″N 71°31′44.04″E
Chaklala	Punjab	OPRN		PAF Base Nur Khan	Military/civil	33°36′59″N 073°05′57″E
Rawalpindi	Punjab	OPQS		Dhamial Army Airbase	Military	33°33′37″N 073°02′00″E
Quetta	Balochistan			PAF Base Samungli	Military	30°14′33.72″N 068°56′26.52″E
Risalpur	Khyber Pakhtunkhwa	OPRS		PAF Academy	Military	34°04′52″N 071°58′21″E
Sargodha	Punjab	OPSR	SGI	PAF Base Mushaf (Sargodha Air Base)	Military	32°02′55″N 072°39′55″E
Shorkot	Punjab	OPRQ		PAF Base Rafiqui (Shorkot Air Base)	Military	33°45′29″N 072°16′57″E
Sialkot	Punjab	OPST		Pakistan Military Sialkot Cantonment Airport	Military	33°34'14.0"N 71°26'22.0"E
Washuk District	Balochistan			Shamsi Airfield (Bhandari Airstrip)	Military	27°51′0″N 65°10′0″E
Jamshoro District	Sindh	none	none	PAF Base Bholari(Noriabad Air Base)	Military	25°14′35″N 68°02′11″E
Karachi	Sindh	NVCOM	OPSF	PNS Mehran	Military – Naval Air Station	24°52′22″N 67°06′35″E
Ormara	Balochistan	NVCOM	None	Naval Air Station Ormara	Military – Naval Air Station	
Kech District	Balochistan	NVCOM	None	PNS Siddique	Military – Naval Air Station	

=== Defunct Airports ===
City	Province	ICAO	IATA	Airport name	Former usage	Coordinates	Current status
Chaklala	Punjab	OPRN		Chaklala	IATA: ISB, ICAO: OPRN		PAF Base Nur Khan
Gwadar	Balochistan	OPGD		Gwadar	IATA: GWD, ICAO: OPGD	25°13′56″N 62°19′38″E	Old Gwadar International Airport

== See also ==
- Dry ports, sea ports and railway stations in Pakistan
- Air Bases of Pakistan Air Force
- Airlines of Pakistan
- Transport in Pakistan
- List of airports by ICAO code: O#OP – Pakistan
- Wikipedia: Airline destination lists: Asia#Pakistan
