= Dalbandin Airport =

Airport in Pakistan

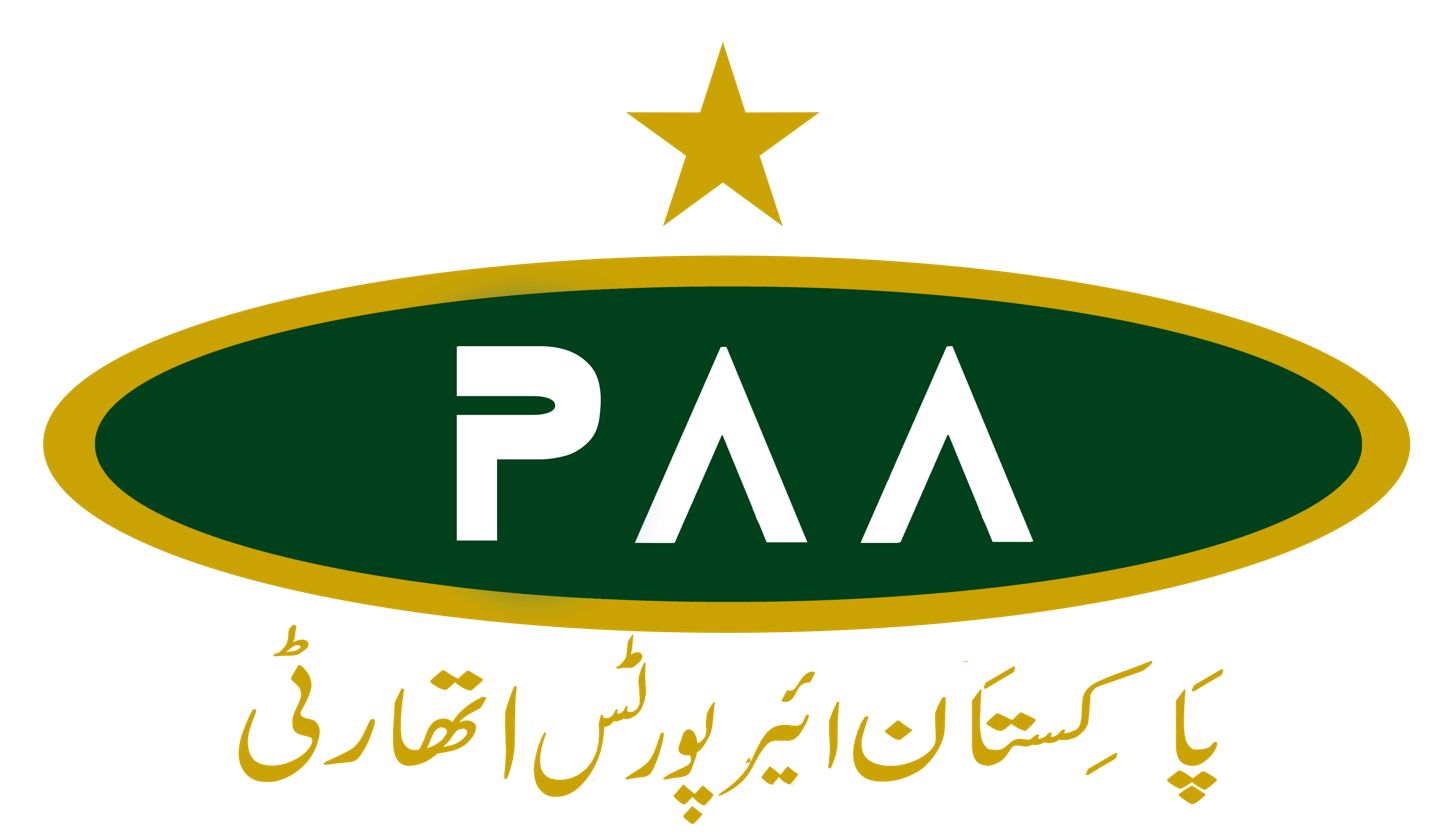
Dalbandin Airport دلبندین ہوائی اڈہ
- IATA: DBA; ICAO: OPDB

Summary
- Airport type: Joint-use airport
- Owner: GoP Aviation Division
- Operator: Pakistan Airports Authority
- Serves: Dalbandin
- Location: Chagai District, Balochistan, Pakistan
- Elevation AMSL: 2,777 ft / 846.43 m
- Coordinates: 28°52′30″N 64°24′16″E
- Website: paa.gov.pk

Map
- Location of airport in Pakistan OPDB (Pakistan) OPDB (South Asia)

Runways
Direction	Length		Surface
Direction	ft	m	Surface
13/31	6,640	2,024	Bitumen

Statistics (2024-25)
- Aircraft movements: 12
- Sources: PAA AIP

Dalbandin Airport (IATA: DBA, ICAO: OPDB) (Balochi: دالبندین بالی پٹ) is a domestic airport located at the town of Dalbandin in the Balochistan province of Pakistan.

== History ==
The foundation of the airport was laid by the British Raj when in 1935 they established an airstrip in the town of Dalbandin to serve as a satellite of Samungli airbase in Quetta. During the Second World war, the airfield was activated by the British military consequent to threats of a Soviet invasion through Iran. After the end of the war, it became disused and remained that way for a while.

In 1985, the Pakistan Civil Aviation Authority took control of the airfield and started infrastructure upgrades to the facility under which it was transformed into a full-fledged domestic airport with navigational aids, air traffic control facilities, passenger terminals and a paved runway. It was also connected by road links through the N-25 National Highway.

Over the years, members of the House of Saud and Royal families of the United Arab Emirates amongst other Arab royalties from the Middle East have been utilizing the airport for hunting tours. In early 2024, media reported that plans were underway to carpet the airport's runway.

=== Chaghi nuclear tests ===
Throughout the Pakistani nuclear project, the airport was used heavily by the Pakistan Atomic Energy Commission for the preparation of Chagai-I tests.

=== U.S invasion of Afghanistan ===
Amidst the U.S. led Operation Enduring Freedom in 2001, the Government of Pakistan allowed coalition forces to use a few aerodrome facilities within Pakistan for logistical purposes to support operations in Afghanistan. Dalbandin airport was one of them due to its strategic location as it was located 50 km from the international border with Afghanistan. The airport saw heavy NATO transport and cargo aircraft traffic during this time span.

In the wake of the 2011 NATO attack in Pakistan, Pakistani airspace was closed down to coalition aircraft along with the airports too. Dalbandin was later vacated by coalition forces.

In 2019, Prime Minister Imran Khan's administration gave permission for the U.S. to use Dalbandin airport though it was strictly limited to logistical purposes only.

== See also ==
- List of airports in Pakistan
- Airlines of Pakistan
- Transport in Pakistan
- Pakistan Civil Aviation Authority
