= Mansehra Airport =

- IATA: none; ICAO: none

Summary
- Airport type: proposed airport project
- Serves: Mansehra district, Khyber Pakhtunkhwa, Pakistan.

Mansehra Airport is a proposed airport project in the Mansehra district of Khyber Pakhtunkhwa, Pakistan.

== Background ==
In August 2016 the federal government allotted Rs. 5 million to buy land for the Mansehra Airport project and build the airport's essential amenities. However, in response to criticism from the Public Accounts Committee (PAC), the administration formally abandoned the initiative.

The authorities chose to use Muzaffarabad Airport instead of Mansehra Airport for flight operations in the North Zone, despite the fact that Mansehra Airport was supposed to improve connection and mobility for the residents of Mansehra and the surrounding areas.

== See also ==
- List of airports in Pakistan
