= Parachinar Airport =

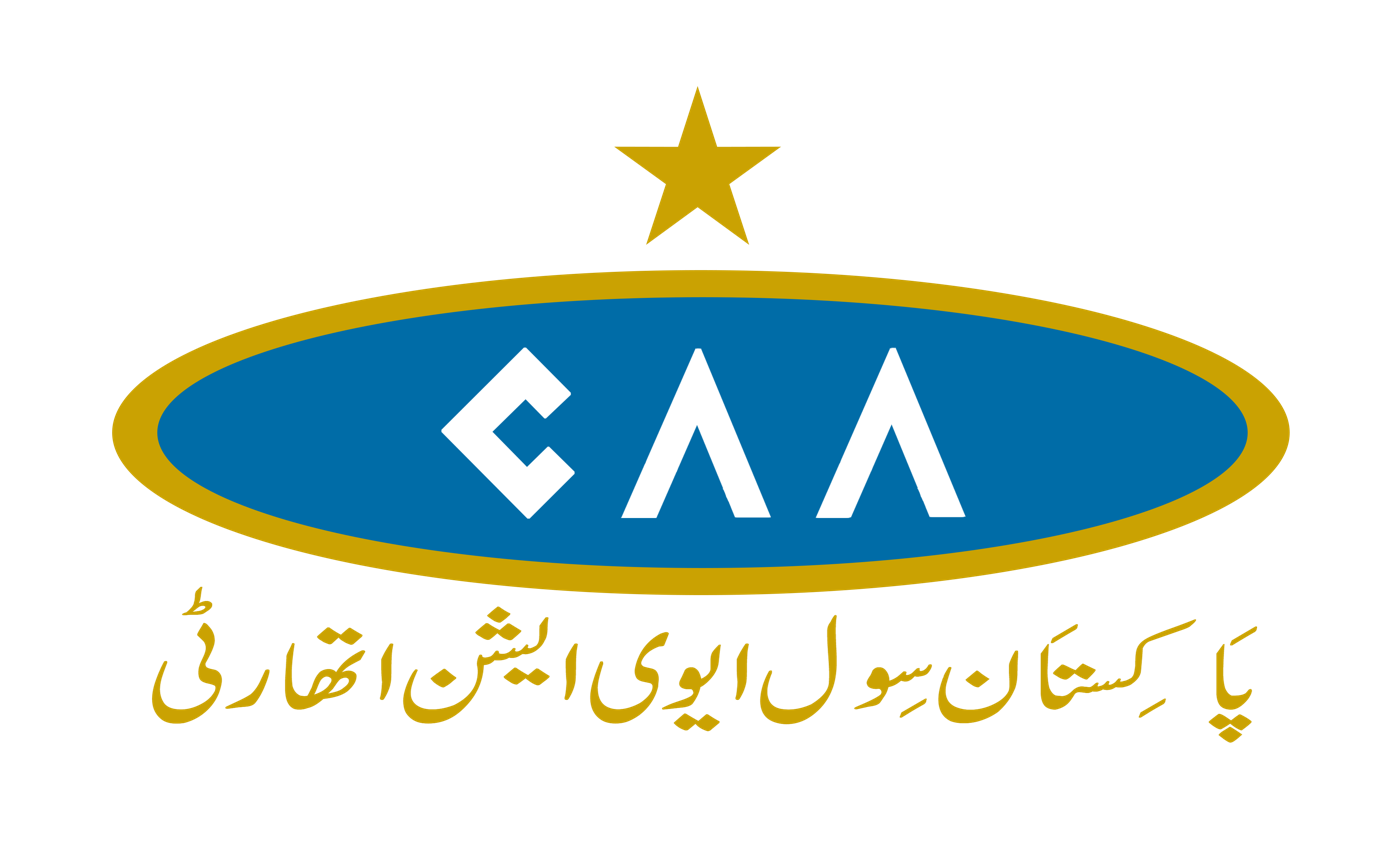
Parachinar Airport پاراچنار ہوائی اڈا
- IATA: PAJ; ICAO: OPPC

Summary
- Airport type: Public
- Owner: GoP Aviation Division
- Operator: Pakistan Airports Authority
- Serves: Parachinar-26300
- Location: Kurram District, Kohat Division, Khyber Pakhtunkhwa, Pakistan
- Closed: 2002
- Built: 1980s
- Elevation AMSL: 5,800 ft (1,800 m)
- Coordinates: 33°54′09″N 70°04′17″E
- Website: caapakistan.com.pk
- Interactive map of Parachinar Airport

Runways
Direction	Length		Surface
Direction	ft	m	Surface
16/34	4,000	1,219	Bitumen
- Sources: CAA AIP

Parachinar Airport (IATA: PAJ, ICAO: OPPC) is an airport located in Parachinar, in Pakistan's Khyber Pakhtunkhwa province. Located at about a 25-minute drive from the centre of Parachinar, it used to be the only airport in the former FATA region that was served by any passenger airline, namely Pakistan International Airlines. The PIA service to the airport used to be intermittently suspended for varying durations.

The airport was built in the 1980s, following the Russian invasion of Afghanistan, to provide landing facilities for military aircraft.

In April 2026, the airport’s rehabilitation was completed by the FWO (Frontier Works Organisation), and the airport was made functional again.

== See also ==
- List of airports in Pakistan
- Airlines of Pakistan
- Transport in Pakistan
- Pakistan Civil Aviation Authority
