= Ormara Airport =

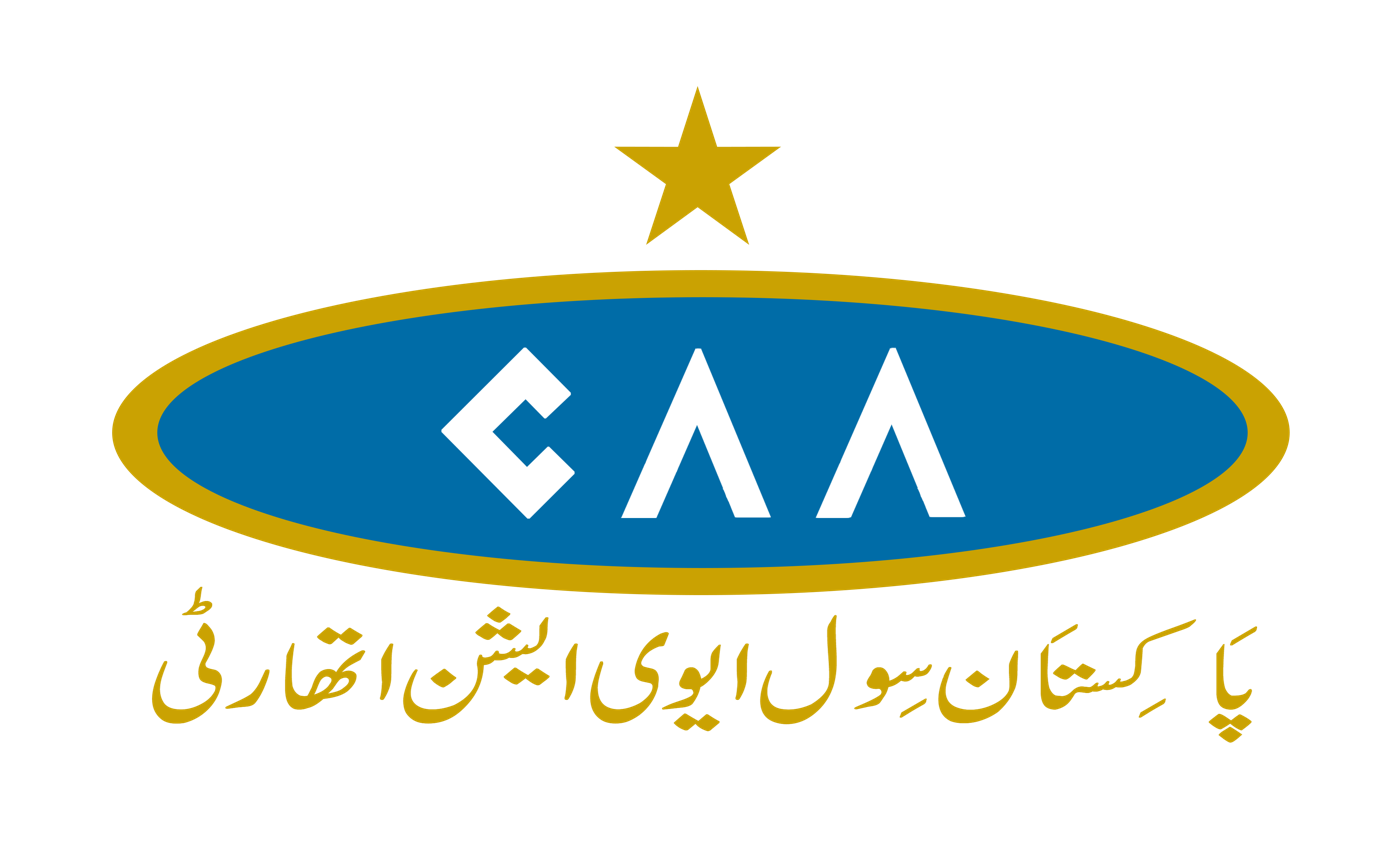
Ormara Airport اورماڑہ ہوائی اڈہ
- IATA: ORW; ICAO: OPOR

Summary
- Airport type: Joint-use airport
- Owner: GoP Aviation Division
- Operator: Pakistan Airports Authority
- Serves: Ormara-91400
- Location: Ormara Tehsil, Gwadar District, Balochistan, Pakistan
- Elevation AMSL: 10 ft / 3 m
- Coordinates: 25°16′29″N 64°35′10″E
- Website: paa.gov.pk
- Interactive map of Ormara Airport

Runways
Direction	Length		Surface
Direction	ft	m	Surface
06/24	5,000	1,524	Bitumen
- Sources: PCAA AIP

Ormara Airport (IATA: ORW, ICAO: OPOR) is a domestic airport, located at Ormara, Balochistan, Pakistan.

In April 2025, media reports counted Ormara among 10 airports nationwide that had remained inactive for extended periods and proving a burden on national exchequer. Ormara Airport was said to have been inactive since 2010.

== See also ==
- List of airports in Pakistan
