= Moenjo Daro Airport =

Mohanjo Daro Airport
- IATA: MJD; ICAO: OPMJ

Summary
- Airport type: Public
- Operator: Pakistan Airports Authority
- Serves: Larkana
- Location: Mohanjo-daro
- Elevation AMSL: 154 ft / 47 m
- Coordinates: 27°20′07″N 68°08′35″E
- Interactive map of Mohanjo Daro Airport

Runways
| Direction | Length | | Surface |
| Direction | ft | m | Surface |
|---|---|---|---|
| 08/26 | 6,512 | 1,985 | Asphalt |

Statistics (2016-17)
- Passengers: 284
- Passenger change: ▼29%
- Aircraft movements: 436

Moenjo Daro Airport (IATA: MJD, ICAO: OPMJ) is a domestic airport located in Mohenjo-daro, Larkana District in Pakistan's Sindh province under the administration of the Pakistan Civil Aviation Authority. It is 28 km from the city of Larkana.

It used to be the third-busiest airport in Sindh.

== History ==
The Moenjo-daro airport was constructed in 1967. In 1973, the airport was upgraded. Its runway and terminal buildings were extended in 1996.

== See also ==
- List of airports in Pakistan
