= Muzaffarabad Airport =

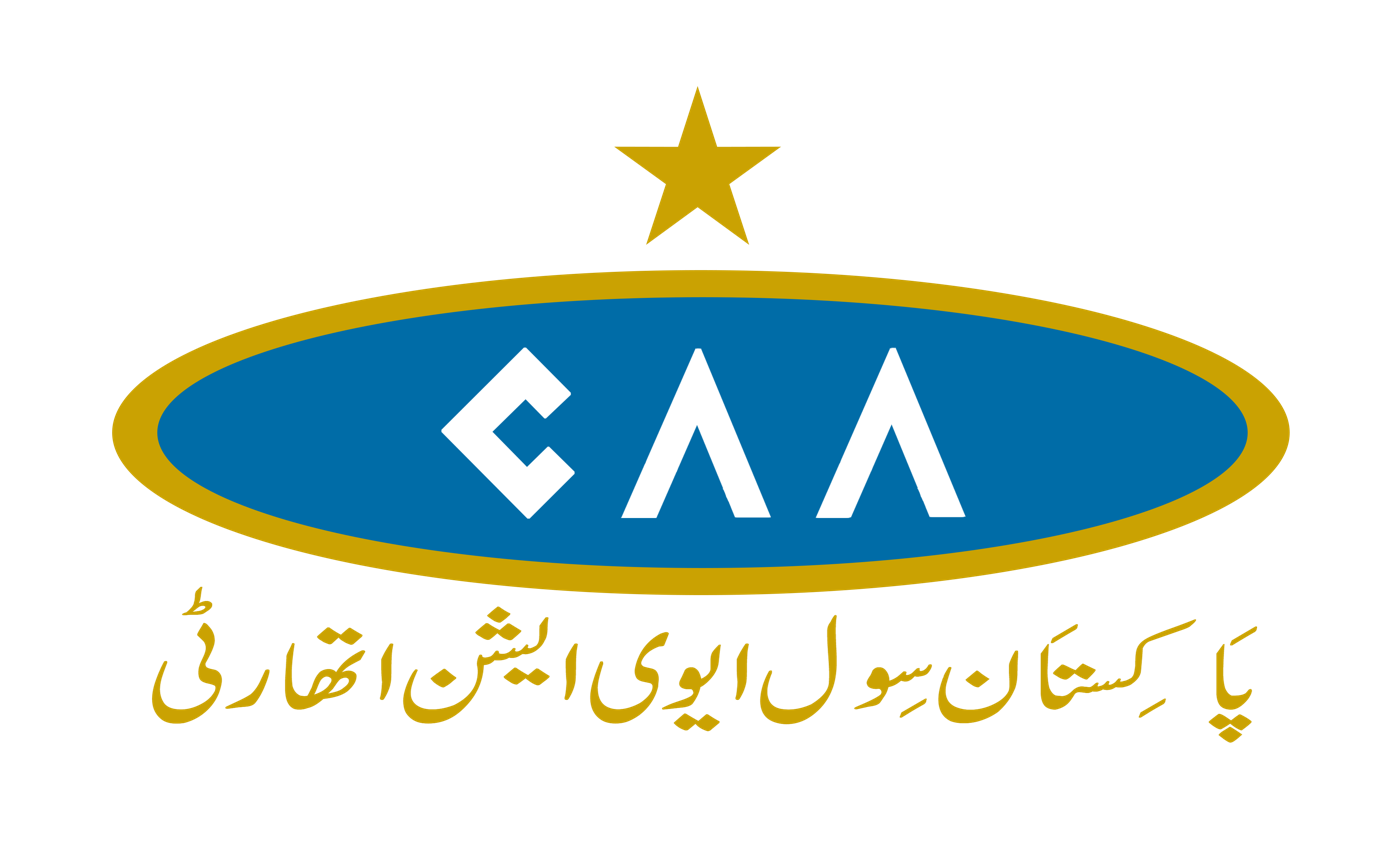
Muzaffarabad Airport مظفر آباد ہوائی اڈا
- IATA: MFG; ICAO: OPMF

Summary
- Airport type: Public
- Owner: GoP Aviation Division
- Operator: Pakistan Civil Aviation Authority (formerly)
- Serves: Muzaffarabad
- Location: Muzaffarabad District, Azad Kashmir, Pakistan
- Closed: October 2005; 20 years ago
- Elevation AMSL: 2,691 ft / 820 m
- Coordinates: 34°20′20″N 73°30′31″E
- Website: paa.gov.pk

Maps
- Location of airport in Pakistan OPMF (Pakistan) OPMF (South Asia)
- Location in Azad Kashmir

Runways
Direction	Length		Surface
Direction	ft	m	Surface
13/31	3,000	914	Bitumen
- Sources: CAA AIP

Muzaffarabad Airport (IATA: MFG, ICAO: OPMF) is a non-operational domestic airport, located in Muzaffarabad, Azad Kashmir, Pakistan.

== Airlines and destinations ==
There are no scheduled flights to this airport. The last time it saw a reasonable amount of traffic was during the rescue operations immediately after the 2005 Kashmir earthquake.

== See also ==
- List of airports in Pakistan
- Rawalakot Airport
- Skardu International Airport
