= Khuzdar Airport =

Airport in Pakistan

- IATA: KDD; ICAO: OPKH

Summary
- Airport type: Public
- Operator: Pakistan Airports Authority
- Location: Khuzdar-89100
- Elevation AMSL: 4,012 ft / 1,223 m
- Coordinates: 27°47′40″N 66°38′25″E
- Interactive map of Khuzdar Airport

Runways
Direction	Length		Surface
Direction	ft	m	Surface
12/30	6,001	1,829	Bitumen

Khuzdar Airport (IATA: KDD, ICAO: OPKH) (Urdu: خضدار ہوائی اڈا) is situated 5 km away from the city centre of Khuzdar, Balochistan, Pakistan. Currently, the airport operates without any scheduled flights, resulting in financial losses due to its operational costs.

In April 2025, the Ministry of Defence informed the National Assembly that 10 airports across Pakistan were non-operational, including some that had been closed for over a decade. Khuzdar Airport, mentioned in that list, was stated to have been non-operational since 2002.

== See also ==
- List of airports in Pakistan
