= Chilas Airfield =

Airfield in Pakistan

Chilas Airfield چلاس ہوائی اڈا
- IATA: CHB; ICAO: OPCL

Summary
- Airport type: Public
- Operator: Pakistan Airports Authority
- Serves: Chilas
- Location: Diamer District, Gilgit-Baltistan, Pakistan
- Opened: 1927
- Elevation AMSL: 1,264 m / 4,146 ft
- Coordinates: 35°25′37″N 074°05′06″E
- Website: paa.gov.pk
- Interactive map of Chilas Airfield

Runways
Direction	Length		Surface
Direction	m	ft	Surface
N/A	1,372	4,500	Paved

Chilas Airfield (IATA: CHB, ICAO: OPCL) is an airfield located at Chilas, a town in the Gilgit-Baltistan region of northern Pakistan.

== History ==
Chilas Airfield was built by the British Raj in 1927 to support movement of troops and government officials. After Pakistan's independence, the Frontier Works Organisation (FWO) further developed it to support the construction of the Karakoram Highway; the FWO along with the Pakistan Air Force continued to utilize the airfield till 1970 after which it became disused.

Proposals to transform the inactive airfield into an international airport came up during the rule of Pakistan People's Party (2008-2013) though none of them materialized. However, in 2018 the Water and Power Development Authority (WAPDA) constituted a high-level board for reactivating the airfield for both tourism and logistic purposes. The nine-member board, comprising Pakistan Civil Aviation Authority, WAPDA and PAF officials carried out on-site visits of Chilas to assess the possibilities of air facilities there supporting construction of the nearby Diamer-Bhasha Dam.

According to the committee, Chilas airfield will receive minor upgrades and repair works such that it would enable construction officials from WAPDA and China Power Investment Corporation to reach the dam site via air. The airfield is located in the catchment area of Diamer-Basha Dam and would be submerged when the dam's reservoir is filled.

== See also ==
- List of airports in Pakistan
