= Jiwani Airport =

Jiwani Airport جِيوانى ہوائی اڈا
- IATA: JIW; ICAO: OPJI

Summary
- Airport type: Public
- Operator: Pakistan Airports Authority
- Location: Jiwani-91100
- Closed: Since 2004
- Elevation AMSL: 184 ft (56 m)
- Coordinates: 25°04′04″N 061°48′20″E
- Website: caapakistan.com.pk
- Interactive map of Jiwani Airport

Runways
| Direction | Length | | Surface |
| Direction | ft | m | Surface |
|---|---|---|---|
| 03/21 | 5,849.738 | 1,783 | Composite material |
- Sources: CAA AIP

Jiwani Airport (IATA: JIW, ICAO: OPJI) is an in-active airport located in the town of Jiwani in the Gwadar District of Pakistan's Balochistan province. It is situated 10 km from the city center of Jiwani, a fishing port situated besides the Gulf of Oman.

The airport is 34 km from the Iranian border and holds strategic importance in the region, being located adjacent to the shipping lanes to and from the Persian Gulf.

== History ==
=== World War II ===
Also known as RAF Jiwani, during World War II, the airport was also used by the United States Army Air Forces Air Transport Command. It functioned as a stopover en route to Sharjah Airport, UAE or Karachi Airport, Pakistan on the Karachi-Cairo route. Visiting the barracks area of the base used during World War II in Jiwani reveals many handwritten small stories and names of Allied pilots. A water system at the base, which is no longer in use, is a marvel of civil works and holds great uniqueness for meeting water requirements of the base. It used to store rain water in three stages in order to clean the water using its usual flow. The water was then pumped to the base and also up to the Victoria Hut which is nearly 5 km from the water tank system.

== Accidents ==
- 1 March 1940: A Handley Page H.P.42 of the Imperial Airways en route to Jiwani from Sharjah Airport went missing over the Gulf of Oman with 4 crew and 4 passengers. Wreckage was later found on the Iranian coast at Ras al Kuh.
- 8 June 1948: An Afghan Air Force aircraft inbound to Jiwani from Iran's Shaja airport made a crash landing at the airport. The crew survived while the aircraft suffered damage to one of its wings. The crash was attributed to poor visibility.
- 30 August 2015: A dozen militants from the BLA terrorist outfit intruded into the airport at 0300 local time and torched various navigation equipment before attacking airport staff. Two airport staff were killed while one was injured. A joint operation of Pakistani intelligence and Frontier Corps Balochistan later led to the arrest of 8 of the accused.

== See also ==
- List of airports in Pakistan
