= Chashma Airport =

Airport in Punjab, Pakistan

DING KHOLA (Chashma(PAEC COLONY)Kundian Airport
- IATA: none; ICAO: none

Summary
- Airport type: VVIP
- Operator: Pakistan Civil Aviation Authority
- Serves: Chashma-42030, Punjab, Pakistan
- Elevation AMSL: 645 ft (197 m)
- Coordinates: 32°25′28″N 071°27′30″E
- Interactive map of DING KHOLA (Chashma(PAEC COLONY)Kundian Airport

Runways
Direction	Length		Surface
Direction	ft	m	Surface
06/24	3,500	1,067	Asphalt

Khanqah Sirrajia (Ding Khola) (Chashma (PAEC Colony)) Airport is located near Kundian in the Punjab province, Pakistan. Presently, no airline serves this airport. It is only used by VVIP passengers who arrive there via government helicopter. The airport is on the Pakistan Civil Aviation Authority map and any plane can use it during an emergency. It was also used by the International Atomic Energy Agency inspectors who visited the Chashma Nuclear Power Complex. In 2015, when a PAF plane crashed in this region, an army helicopter used this facility to transport the bodies.

== Facilities ==
The airport sits at an elevation of 645 feet (197 m) above mean sea level. It has one runway, designated 06/24, with an asphalt surface measuring 3,500 by 50 feet (1,067 m × 15 m).

== See also ==
- Airlines of Pakistan
- List of airports in Pakistan
- Transport in Pakistan
