= Chitral Airport =

Airport in Chitral

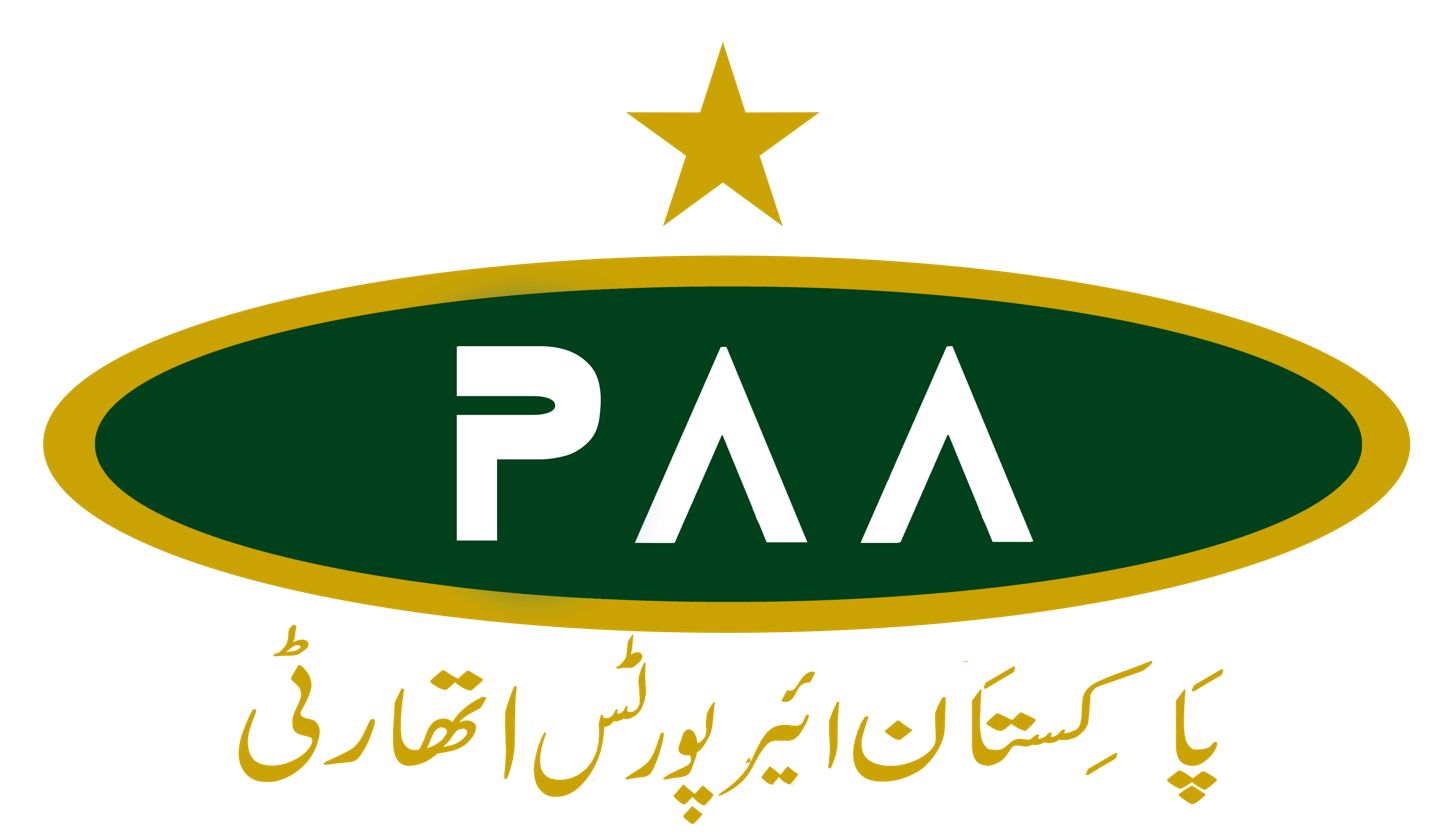
Chitral Airport چترال ہوائی اڈا

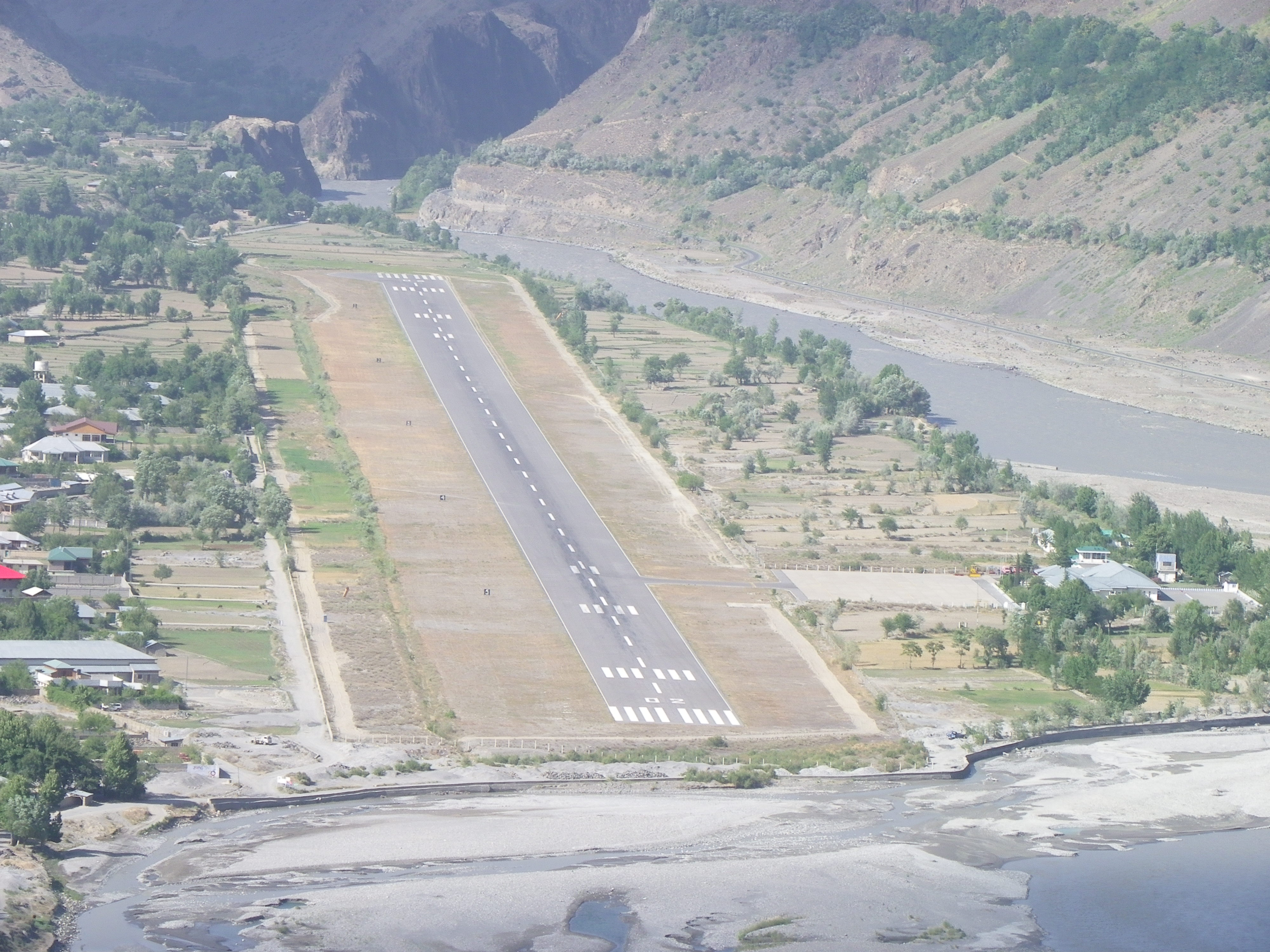
- Chitral Airport in 2010.
- IATA: CJL; ICAO: OPCH

Summary
- Airport type: Public
- Owner: GoP Aviation Division
- Operator: Pakistan Airports Authority
- Serves: Chitral
- Location: Lower Chitral District, Malakand Division, Khyber Pakhtunkhwa, Pakistan
- Elevation AMSL: 4,920 ft / 1,500 m
- Coordinates: 35°53′10″N 71°47′59″E
- Website: paa.gov.pk
- Interactive map of Chitral Airport

Runways
Direction	Length		Surface
Direction	ft	m	Surface
02/20	5,800	1,768	Bitumen

Statistics (2023-24)
- Passengers: 376
- Passenger change: ▼42.24%
- Aircraft movements: 18
- Sources: PAA AIP

Chitral Airport (IATA: CJL, ICAO: OPCH) is a small domestic airport situated 2 NM (3.7 km) north of the city centre of Chitral, in the Khyber Pakhtunkhwa province of Pakistan.

in May 2019, the Pakistan Civil Aviation Authority began development work at Chitral airport.

In March 2025, Pakistan International Airlines, the national flag carrier, stated that it would resume, after a gap of about three years, flights between Chitral and Islamabad from April 5 initially once a week.

== Airlines and destinations ==
Airlines	Destinations
Pakistan International Airlines	Islamabad

== See also ==
- List of airports in Pakistan
