= Pasni Airport =

Airport in Pakistan

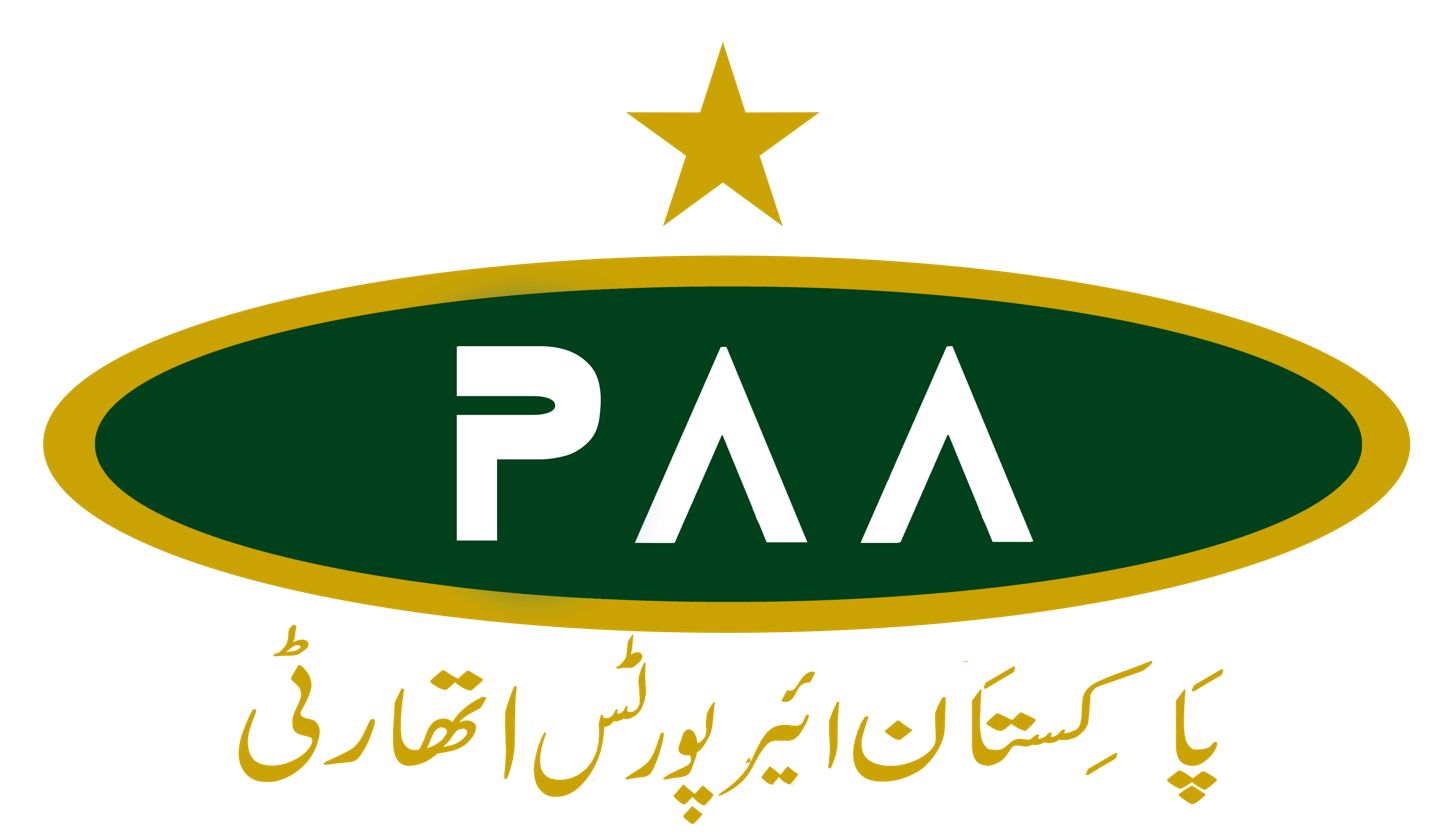
Pasni Airport پسنی ہوائی اڈہ
- IATA: PSI; ICAO: OPPI

Summary
- Airport type: Joint-use airport
- Owner: GoP Aviation Division
- Operator: Pakistan Airports Authority
- Serves: Pasni
- Location: Pasni Tehsil, Gwadar District, Balochistan, Pakistan
- Elevation AMSL: 33 ft / 10 m
- Coordinates: 25°17′24″N 63°20′39″E
- Website: paa.gov.pk

Map
- Location of airport in Pakistan OPPI (Pakistan) OPPI (South Asia)

Runways
Direction	Length		Surface
Direction	ft	m	Surface
06/24	9,000	2,743	Bitumen
- Sources: PAA AIP

PAF Base Pasni (IATA: PSI, ICAO: OPPI) is a joint-civilian and military domestic airport, located at Pasni City, Balochistan, Pakistan.

== History ==
PAF Base Pasni was commissioned on 2 April, 1984. Soon after the September 11 attacks, the provincial government denied rumours that the United States Department of Defense had had some presence at the site linked to the United States invasion of Afghanistan to oust the Taliban regime. In 2016, PAF Base Pasni was renovated and new Airfield Lighting Systems installed. It was completed in 2018 by RMB Enterprises and after a testing phase handed over to the Air Traffic Control.

== See also ==
- List of airports in Pakistan
