= Bahawalpur Airport =

Airport in Punjab, Pakistan

Bahawalpur International Airport
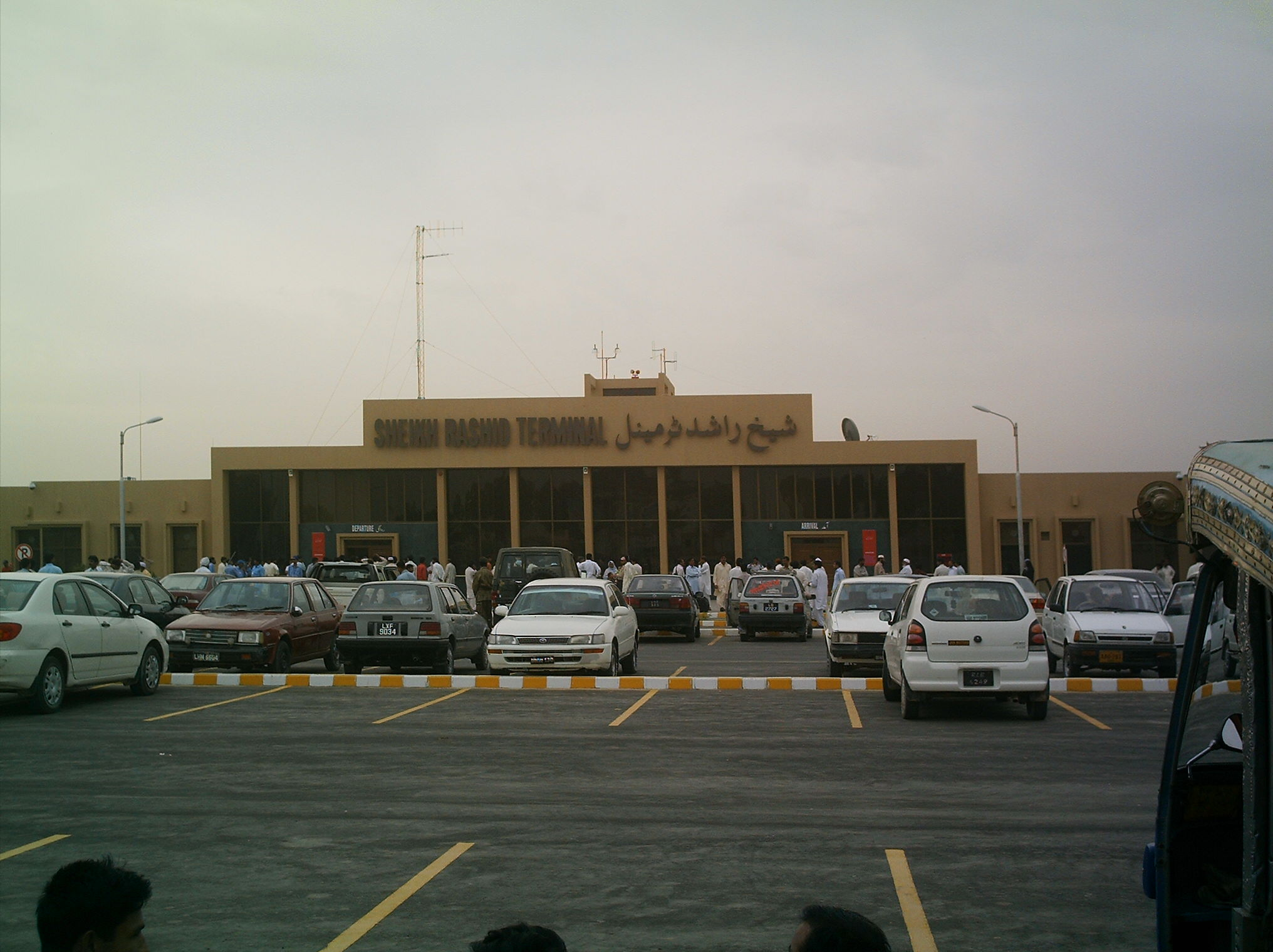
- IATA: BHV; ICAO: OPBW

Summary
- Airport type: Public
- Operator: Pakistan Airports Authority
- Serves: Bahawalpur District, Punjab
- Location: Bahawalpur-63100
- Elevation AMSL: 392 ft (119 m)
- Coordinates: 29°20′53″N 71°43′04″E
- Interactive map of Bahawalpur International Airport

Runways
| Direction | Length | | Surface |
| Direction | m | ft | Surface |
|---|---|---|---|
| 08/26 | 2,848 | 9,345 | Asphalt |

Statistics (2024–2025)
- Passengers: 34,493
- Passenger change: ▲9.6%
- Aircraft movements: 932 Sources: AIP Pakistan and DAFIF

Bahawalpur International Airport (IATA: BHV, ICAO: OPBW) is situated 2 nm (3.7 km) from the city centre of Bahawalpur, in lower Punjab, Pakistan. The airport mainly caters to the city of Bahawalpur, however, the national carrier, Pakistan International Airlines (PIA), decided to launch international flights to the Middle East in July 2009. The airport extension project is being supervised by the Dubai Civil Aviation Department.

== History ==
The airport was re-developed from funds of the United Arab Emirates government. A new terminal has been constructed and was renamed after the ruler of Dubai, Sheikh Rashid bin Saeed Al Maktoum, who helped fund and oversee its construction. On 9 November 2002 the first portion of 4,400-foot (1,300 m)-long runway of the Bahawalpur airport was opened. A PIA Fokker F27 Friendship landed at the airport from Islamabad. The entire expenditure of the project is estimated to be Rs 260 million and most of it was borne by the ruler of Dubai. During November 2004, contractors began working on re-developing the old airport into a more modern and advanced facility.

During 2005, the PIA earned a record revenue of Rs 150 million by operating from this airport, which was double compared to the year 2004. On 21 January 2007, phase two of the airport was inaugurated and Sheikh Hamdan bin Rashid Al Maktoum, Deputy Ruler of Dubai, opened the facility and viewed the new amenities including the departures and arrivals halls.

In 2026, South Air expanded its domestic network by launching flight operations connecting Bahawalpur with Karachi and Islamabad. The airline operates flights three times a week / weekly on this route.

== Structure ==
The new building was named after late Dubai Emir, Sheikh Rashid Terminal, who also funded the majority of the project. The airport has a concourse hall for the arrival of approximately 60 to 70 passengers and departure lounges for about 140 passengers with several rooms for offices of the airport and airline managers, which was not available at the old building. Besides that, there is also a Commercially Important Persons (CIP) lounge instead of a VIP lounge. According to airport manager Tahir Ahsan, the CIP lounge has been constructed to do away with the "VIP culture", where any premium passenger can use the lounge. There are also food outlets provided and the new traffic control tower has also been built within the building.

There are many cameras installed in the building to monitor the movement of passengers. A flight information system was also introduced in the building. All parts of the building are air-conditioned. A royal lounge has also been built adjacent to the main terminal building. The lounge will be reserved for princes and members of the royal family whenever they visit the city. A parking lot has been built outside the building after converting the surrounding sandy area into lush green lawns.

The airport consists of arrival and departure halls, new airline offices, logistics, engineering and security support centres as well as cargo areas and passenger and cargo aircraft-parking bays. The airport extension project is being supervised by the Dubai Civil Aviation Department as well as the Defence Ministry of Pakistan. The recent extension of the airport was set to streamline air cargo operations and boost agricultural exports from the Punjab province.

== Airlines and destinations ==
| Airlines | Destinations |
|---|---|
| South Air | Karachi, Islamabad |

== Incidents and accidents ==
- On 17 August 1988, a Pakistan Air Force Lockheed C-130B Hercules carrying the President of Pakistan Zia-ul-Haq and many top diplomats crashed shortly after take-off. Although never proven, many believe this involved an act of sabotage. See Death and state funeral of Muhammad Zia-ul-Haq

== See also ==
- List of airlines of Pakistan
- List of airports in Pakistan
- Pakistan Civil Aviation Authority
- Transport in Pakistan
