= Dera Ghazi Khan Airport =

Airport in Pakistan

Dera Ghazi Khan Airport ڈیرہ غازی خان ہوائی اڈا
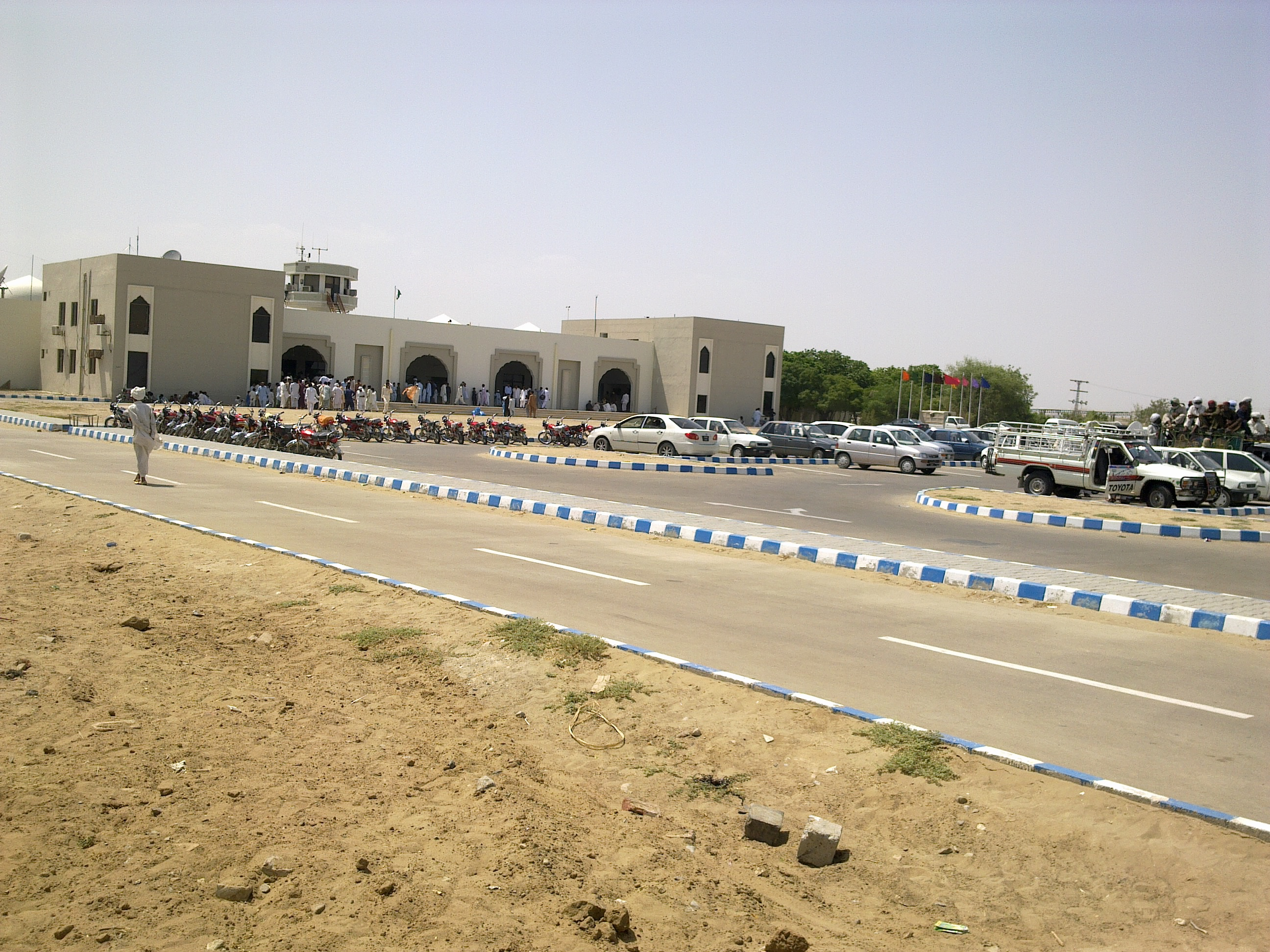
- Dera Ghazi Khan Airport
- IATA: DEA; ICAO: OPDG

Summary
- Airport type: Public
- Operator: Pakistan Airports Authority
- Serves: Dera Ghazi Khan-32200, Punjab, Pakistan
- Elevation AMSL: 148 m (486 ft)
- Coordinates: 29°57′39″N 070°29′09″E

Map
- Interactive map of Dera Ghazi Khan Airport

Runways
Direction	Length		Surface
Direction	m	ft	Surface
18/36	1,990	6,500	Asphalt

Statistics (2016–17)
- Passengers: 12,059
- Passenger change: ▼14.2%
- Aircraft movements: 322 DAFIF

Dera Ghazi Khan Airport or D. G. Khan Airport (IATA: DEA, ICAO: OPDG) (Balochi: ڈیرہ غازی خان بالی پٹ, Urdu: ڈیرہ غازی خان بین الاقوامی ہوائی اڈا) is an international airport in Punjab, Pakistan. The airport is 15 km (9.3 mi) from the city centre of Dera Ghazi Khan.

== History ==
=== Operations ===
In 2009, Pakistan International Airlines started a Multan-Dera Ghazi Khan-Dubai flight. Dera Ghazi Khan was used as a stopover and the main sector of this flight. This route ended in 2014 though.

=== 2026 rehabilitation ===
In 2026, it was announced that Dera Ghazi Khan Airport will undergo a rehabilitation that includes an extension of the runway, tarmac, and upgrading the airport to international standards by January 2028.

== See also ==
- List of airports in Pakistan
