= Benazirabad Airport =

Benazirabad Airport Nawabshah Airport
- IATA: WNS; ICAO: OPNH

Summary
- Airport type: Public/military
- Operator: Pakistan Airports Authority and Pakistan Air Force
- Location: Nawabshah, Sindh, Pakistan
- Elevation AMSL: 29 m / 95 ft
- Coordinates: 26°13′10″N 68°23′24″E

Map
- Interactive map of Benazirabad Airport

Runways
Direction	Length		Surface
Direction	m	ft	Surface
02/20	2,743	8,999	Concrete

Benazirabad Airport (Formally Nawabshah Airport) (IATA: WNS, ICAO: OPNH) is a defunct airport located about 3 kilometres (1.9 mi) southwest of Nawabshah, a city in the Pakistani province of Sindh. It has one runway, which has a length of 2,743 metres (8,999 ft). Built by the British Raj, Benazirabad Airport does not handle any scheduled passenger flights, but it has been used as a diversion airport. It is also used by the Pakistan Air Force.

== History ==
The airport dates to the time of the British Raj. In the early 1960s, a concrete runway was laid. A new terminal building was completed in October 1992, and a new apron and runway were commissioned in 1998.

Nawabshah Airport does not receive any scheduled flights as of November 2016. It has been used as a diversion airport for aircraft suffering mechanical problems or when Jinnah International Airport in Karachi is closed, for example due to weather conditions, or during the 2014 Jinnah International Airport attack by Tehrik-e-Taliban Pakistan terrorists. In addition, the Pakistan Air Force operates at the airport alongside the Pakistan Civil Aviation Authority.

== Infrastructure ==
Nawabshah Airport covers 772 acres (312 ha) and has a concrete runway, 02/20, with dimensions 2,743 by 46 metres (8,999 ft × 151 ft). It cannot handle instrument landing system approaches.

== See also ==
- Transport in Pakistan
