= Zhob Airport =

- IATA: PZH; ICAO: OPZB

Summary
- Airport type: Public
- Operator: Pakistan Airports Authority
- Location: Zhob-85200
- Elevation AMSL: 4,728 ft / 1,441 m
- Coordinates: 31°21′30″N 69°27′49″E
- Interactive map of Zhob Airport

Runways
Direction	Length		Surface
Direction	ft	m	Surface
09/27	6,001	1,829	Asphalt

Statistics (2016-17)
- Passengers: 7,285
- Passenger change: ▼7%
- Aircraft movements: 212

Zhob Airport (IATA: PZH, ICAO: OPZB) is a small domestic airport located in Zhob, Balochistan, Pakistan. The airport caters mainly to the population of Zhob and surrounding townships.

== Past Destinations ==
Previously, PIA served a twice-weekly flight to/from Karachi using ATR aircraft.

== See also ==
- List of airports in Pakistan
