= Mangla Airport =

Military airport in Pakistan

Mangla Airbase
- IATA: XJM; ICAO: OPMA

Summary
- Airport type: Pakistan Army airbase
- Operator: Pak Army
- Location: Mangla
- Elevation AMSL: 902 ft (275 m)
- Coordinates: 33°03′00″N 73°38′18″E
- Interactive map of Mangla Airbase

Runways
Direction	Length		Surface
Direction	ft	m	Surface
14/32	5,000	1,524	Asphalt

Mangla Airbase (IATA: XJM, ICAO: OPMA) is situated 10 km (6.2 mi) from the city centre of Mangla Cantt, in Punjab, Pakistan. It is 3 km (1.9 mi) from the city of Dina, and approximately 20 km (12 mi) from the famous city Mirpur in Azad Kashmir. It is currently not being used by any commercial airline. As of now Pakistan is extending the Mangla airbase runway from 1.3 to 2.3 kilometres (0.81 to 1.43 mi). after this upgrade it will allow C-130 type aircraft to move troops supplies and heavy equipment closer to the front line increasing speed and flexibility and it will also allow fighter jets like F16 JF-17 Thunder to operate. Pakistan is upgrading this airfield because this airfield is only 40–50 kilometres (25–30 mi) away from the Line of Control allowing JF-17 Thunder, F-16 type Jets to reach it in 2-3 minutes.

== See also ==
- List of airports in Pakistan
- Transport in Pakistan
- Pakistan Civil Aviation Authority
- Mangla
- Jhelum Cantonment
