= Sui Airport =

- IATA: SUL; ICAO: OPSU

Summary
- Airport type: Public
- Operator: Pakistan Airports Authority
- Location: Sui (Pakistan)
- Elevation AMSL: 763 ft / 233 m
- Coordinates: 28°38′43″N 69°10′37″E
- Interactive map of Sui Airport

Runways
Direction	Length		Surface
Direction	ft	m	Surface
01/19	4,975	1,516	Sand
01L/19R	6,000	1,829	Asphalt

Sui Airport (IATA: SUL, ICAO: OPSU) is located at Sui in the Balochistan province of Pakistan. It is in use of Pakistan Petroleum Limited employees only.

In June 2004, the airport terminal building was blown up after a terrorist attack.
