= Tarbela Dam Airport =

Pakistani airport

- IATA: TLB; ICAO: OPTA

Summary
- Airport type: Public
- Operator: Pakistan Airports Authority
- Location: Tarbela Dam
- Elevation AMSL: 1,114 ft / 340 m
- Coordinates: 33°59′10″N 72°36′41″E

Map
- Interactive map of Tarbela Dam Airport

Runways
Direction	Length		Surface
Direction	ft	m	Surface
07/25	5,600	1,707	Asphalt

Tarbela Dam Airport (IATA: TLB, ICAO: OPTA) is located near the Indus River in the Haripur District of Khyber Pakhtunkhwa in Pakistan, and is part of the Tarbela Dam project.
