= Bannu Airport =

Pakistani airport

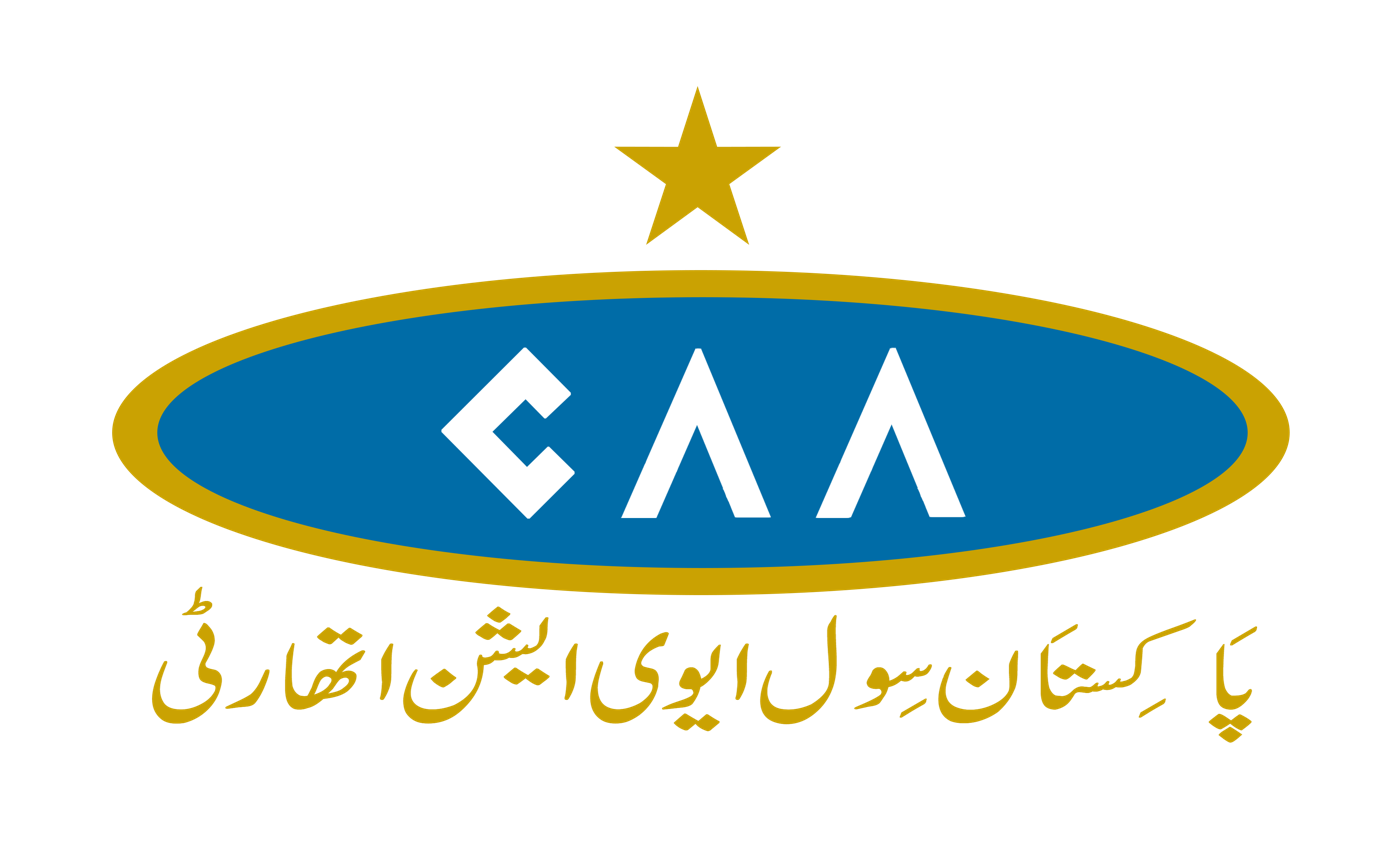
Bannu Airport بنوں ہوائی اڈا
- IATA: BNP; ICAO: OPBN

Summary
- Airport type: Public
- Owner: GoP Aviation Division
- Operator: Pakistan Airports Authority
- Serves: Bannu
- Location: Bannu District, Bannu Division, Khyber Pakhtunkhwa, Pakistan
- Elevation AMSL: 1,343 ft / 409 m
- Coordinates: 32°58′19″N 70°31′29″E
- Website: caapakistan.com.pk
- Interactive map of Bannu Airport

Runways
Direction	Length		Surface
Direction	ft	m	Surface
07/25	6,000	1,829	Bitumen
- Sources: CAA AIP

Bannu Airport (IATA: BNP, ICAO: OPBN) is a defunct airport located 6 nm (11 km) west of the city center of Bannu, in Khyber-Pakhtunkhwa province of Pakistan.

It was constructed to provide services to Bannu's population and neighbouring communities. It is not as large as other public sector airports of Pakistan.

The airport is not currently in operation except for emergency diversions. According to employees, no flights have taken here since about 2001.

== History ==
The Central Development Working Party (CDWP) approved to release 715 million PKR for the upgradation of the airport in 2018. There has been no follow up on this project.

In 2024 and 2025, Bannu Airport was mentioned in media reports citing various inactive airports across the country that were a burden on the exchequer.

== See also ==
- List of airports in Pakistan
