= Rawalakot Airport =

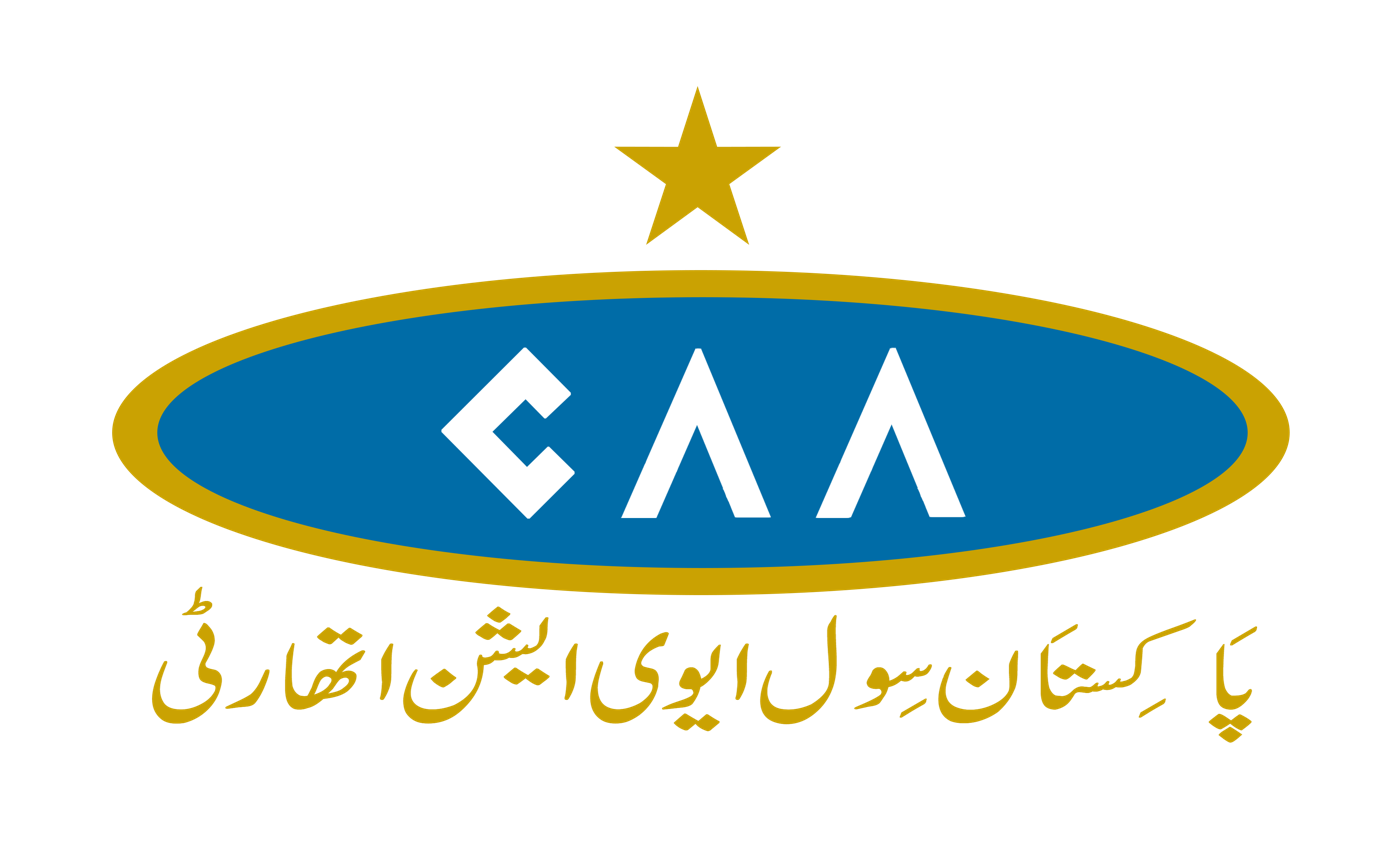
Rawalakot Airport راولا کوٹ ہوائی اڈا

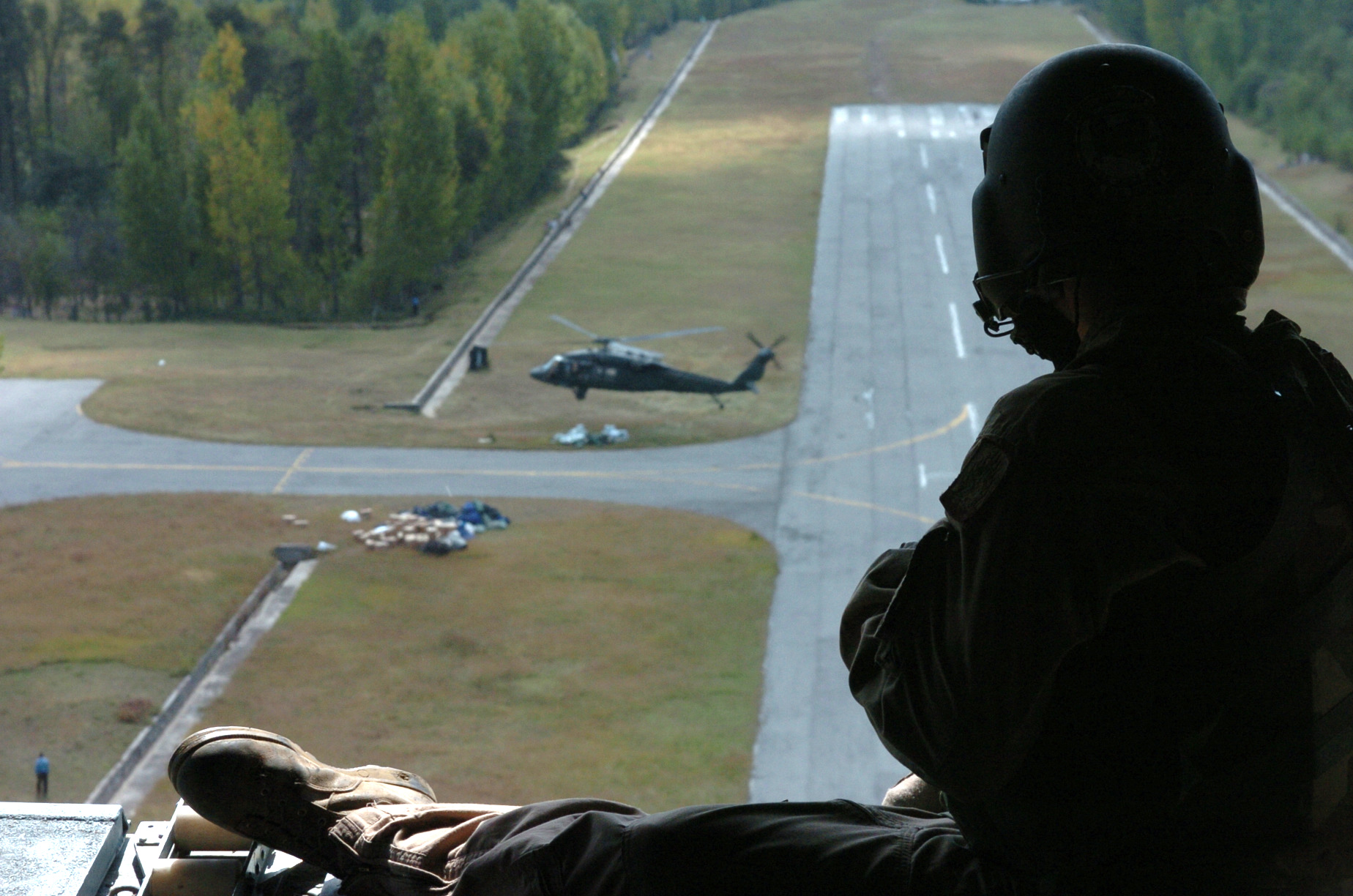
- U.S Army aircraft dropping off emergency aid at Rawalakot Airport after the 2005 Kashmir earthquake.
- IATA: RAZ; ICAO: OPRT

Summary
- Airport type: Public
- Owner: GoP Aviation Division
- Operator: Pakistan Airports Authority
- Serves: Rawalakot-12350
- Location: Poonch District, Azad Kashmir, Pakistan
- Closed: October 2005; 21 years ago
- Elevation AMSL: 5,479 ft (1,670 m)
- Coordinates: 33°50′59″N 73°47′54″E
- Website: caapakistan.com.pk
- Interactive map of Rawalakot Airport

Runways
| Direction | Length | | Surface |
| Direction | ft | m | Surface |
|---|---|---|---|
| 01/19 | 3,000 | 914 | Bitumen |
- Sources: CAA AIP

Rawalakot Airport (IATA: RAZ, ICAO: OPRT) is a non-operational airport located in Rawalakot, Azad Kashmir, Pakistan. The airport is surrounded by a forest and is open to the public.

== History ==
Pakistan International Airlines previously operated flights between Rawalakot and Islamabad but those were discontinued following the devastation of the October 2005 Kashmir earthquake. Rawalakot Airport remains without commercial service as of March 2016.
