= List of airlines of Pakistan =

This is a list of airlines currently operating in Pakistan.

== Scheduled airlines ==
Airline	Image	IATA	ICAO	Callsign	Founded	Notes
Pakistan International Airlines		PK	PIA	PAKISTAN	1946	
Airblue		PA	ABQ	AIRBLUE	2004	
Serene Air		ER	SEP	SERENE	2017	Currently operations are stopped as per CAA notification.
Air Sial		PF	SIF	AIR SIAL	2020	
Fly Jinnah		9P	FJL	OKAAB	2022	
South Air		Z8	SQB		2026	
Air Karachi				AIR KARACHI	2026	

== Charter airlines ==
Airline	Image	IATA	ICAO	Callsign	Founded	Notes
ASSL Air			ACS	AIRCRAFT SALES	1976	
Askari Air Pakistan		4K	AAS	ASKARI AIR	1995	
Princely Jets		PJ	PJP	PRINCELY JETS	2005	
Vision Air International			VIS		2006	

== Cargo airlines ==
Airline	Image	IATA	ICAO	Callsign	Founded	Notes
Air Eagle		EG	EPE	SWIFT CARGO	1991	
Air Falcon		FS	FPK	FEATHER	2015	
TCS Courier			TCS		1983	

== See also ==
- List of airlines
- List of defunct airlines of Asia
- Civil Aviation Authority of Pakistan
- List of airports in Pakistan
- Transport in Pakistan
