= Pakistan Airports Authority =

Airports regulatory authority in Pakistan

- مقتدرہ هوائی اڈے پاکستان
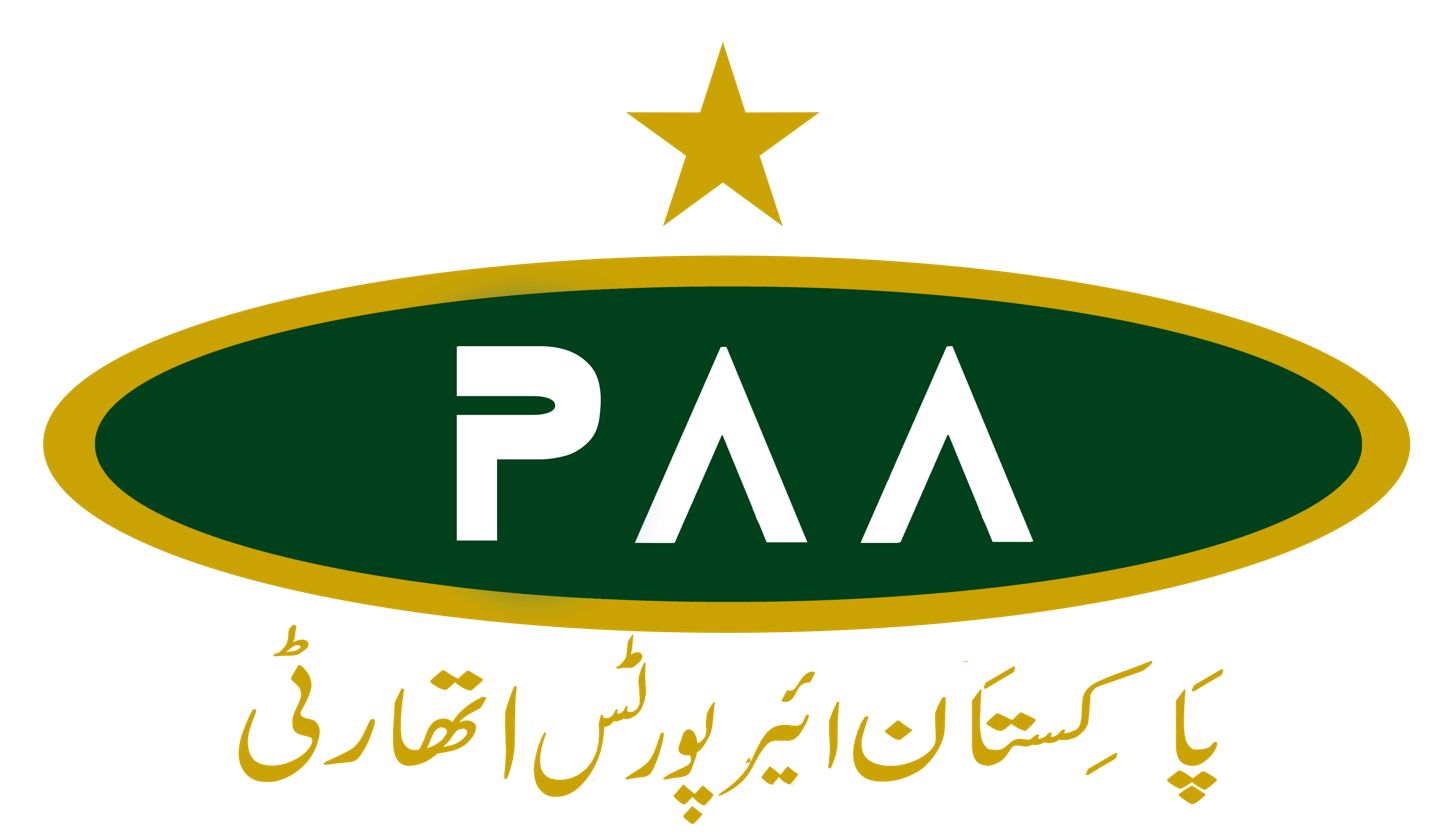

Agency overview
- Formed: 2023
- Preceding agency: Civil Aviation Authority (CAA)
- Jurisdiction: Pakistan
- Parent department: Aviation Division, GoP
- Website: paa.gov.pk

The Pakistan Airports Authority is an authority created under the Pakistan Airports Authority Act of 2023 with the purpose of managing, operating, and developing airports and air transport services across the country. This Act is applicable to all airports and air navigation services involved in air transport and is applicable throughout Pakistan.

The establishment of the Pakistan Airports Authority was part of a larger plan to restructure the Civil Aviation Authority (CAA) into distinct regulatory and operational entities. The objective was to bring about organizational changes with minimal adverse consequences.

The Pakistan Airports Authority Bill of 2023 outlines the formation of an independent civil aviation regulatory body. On 21 July 2023, the bill received approval from the National Assembly, alongside the Pakistan Civil Aviation Bill of 2022.

On 19 February 2026, PAA gave notice to airmen that airspace will remain closed for all Indian civil and military registered aircraft until 23 March. Since tensions between India and Pakistan increased in late April 2025 following an attack in Pahalgam, both countries have closed their airspace to each other's flights.

== Proposed High-rise Headquarter ==
Pakistan Airports Authority (PAA) is set to build a Ground + 25-storey, energy-efficient, headquarters in Blue Area, Islamabad. Covering 115,292 m^{2} (1,240,990 sq ft) the high-rise will consist of six basements for parking and a central atrium extending from the ground floor to the rooftop. Its curved architectural design, double-glazed curtain wall, and green courtyards reflect sustainability and innovation, setting a new benchmark for corporate infrastructure.

== Major traffic flows by airport ==
- Islamabad International Airport
- Jinnah International Airport
- Allama Iqbal International Airport

== See also ==
- Airports Security Force
- List of airports in Pakistan
