= List of airports by ICAO code: O =

List of airports by ICAO code: A - B - C - D - EB-EG - EH-EY - FA-FM - FN-FZ - G - H - ~~I~~ - J - KA-KH - KI-KP - KR-KZ - LA-LJ - LK-LZ - M - N - O - P - Q - R - SA-SC - SD-SH - SI - SJ - SK-SM - SN-SP - SQ - SS-SU - SV-SY - T - U - V - W - ~~X~~ - Y - Z

== OA - Afghanistan ==
Also see airport category and list.

ICAO	IATA	Airport name	Community	Coordinates	Notes
OAAK		Andkhoy Airport	Andkhoy, Faryab	36°56′36″N 065°12′25″E	
OABN	BIN	Bamyan Airport (Shahid Mazari Airport)	Bamyan	34°48′36″N 067°49′14″E	
OABT	BST	Bost Airport	Lashkargah	31°33′32″N 064°21′53″E	
OACC	CCN	Chaghcharan Airport	Chaghcharan	34°31′35″N 065°16′15″E	
OADS	SBF	Sardeh Band Airport	Sardeh Band, Ghazni	33°19′16″N 068°38′11″E	
OADY		Dwyer Airport (military)	Lashkargah	31°05′31″N 064°04′01″E	
OADZ	DAZ	Darwaz Airport	Darwaz	38°27′39″N 070°53′04″E	
OAEM		Eshkashem Airport	Ishkashim, Badakhshan	36°43′55″N 071°35′49″E	
OAFR	FAH	Farah Airport	Farah	32°21′49″N 062°10′03″E	
OAFZ	FBD	Fayzabad Airport	Fayzabad	37°07′10″N 070°31′06″E	
OAGA		Ghaziabad Airport	Ghaziabad, Nangarhar	34°18′57″N 070°45′48″E	
OAGN	GZI	Ghazni Airport	Ghazni	33°30′19″N 068°24′51″E	
OAGZ	GRG	Gardez Airport	Gardez, Paktia	33°37′54″N 069°14′21″E	
OAHN	KWH	Khwahan Airport	Khwahan	37°53′25″N 070°12′14″E	
OAHR	HEA	Herat International Airport (Khwaja Abdullah Ansari International Airport)	Herat	34°12′36″N 062°13′42″E	
OAIX	OAI	Bagram Airfield	Bagram near Charikar	34°56′46″N 069°15′54″E	
OAJL	JAA	Jalalabad Airport	Jalalabad	34°24′01″N 070°29′54″E	Currently military only - new civilian airport being planned
OAKB	KBL	Kabul International Airport (Khwaja Rawash Airport)	Kabul	34°33′57″N 069°12′47″E	
OAKG		Khojaghar Airport	Khwaja Ghar	37°04′59″N 069°22′01″E	Closed
OAKN	KDH	Ahmad Shah Baba International Airport	Kandahar	31°30′21″N 065°50′52″E	
OAKS	KHT	Khost Airport	Khost	33°20′01″N 069°57′09″E	
OALG		Logar Airport	Puli Alam	33°58′59″N 069°01′26″E	Closed
OALL		Lal Airport	Lal wa Sarjangal	34°30′21″N 066°17′59″E	
OAMK		Muqur Airport	Muqur	32°52′36″N 067°50′43″E	
OAMN	MMZ	Maymana Airport	Maymana	35°55′50″N 064°45′40″E	
OAMS	MZR	Mawlānā Jalāl ad-Din Muhammad Balkhī International Airport	Mazar-i-Sharif	36°42′25″N 067°12′34″E	
OANL		Nili Airport	Nili, Daykundi	33°44′27″N 066°09′24″E	
OANZ		Nimruz Airportt	Zaranj	30°57′47″N 062°03′38″E	
OAOG	URN	Urgun Airport	Urgun, Paktia	32°55′52″N 069°09′11″E	
OAPJ		Panjab Airport	Panjab, Bamyan	34°23′31″N 067°01′15″E	
OAQA	APH	Qalat Airport	Qalat, Zabul Province	32°08′02″N 066°53′56″E	
OAQM		Kron Monajn Airport	Kuran wa Munjan	36°10′01″N 070°43′01″E	Closed
OAQN	LQN	Qala i Naw Airport (Qala Nau Airport)	Qala i Naw	34°59′09″N 063°07′04″E	
OARG	URZ	Uruzgan Airport	Khas Uruzgan District, Uruzgan Province	32°54′11″N 066°37′51″E	
OART		Rostaq Airport	Rostaq, Afghanistan	37°06′25″N 069°50′57″E	Closed
OARZ	KUR	Razer Airport	Kuran wa Munjan, Badakhshan	36°01′02″N 070°45′39″E	
OASA	OAS	Sharana Airstrip	Sharana, Paktia	33°07′33″N 068°50′19″E	
OASD	OAH	Shindand Air Base	Shindand, Herat	33°23′32″N 062°15′40″E	
OASG		Sheberghan Airfield	Jowzjan Province	36°45′05″N 065°54′45″E	
OASH	OAA	Forward Operating Base Shank	Baraki Barak	33°55′19″N 069°04′40″E	
OASL	OLR	Forward Operating Base Salerno	Khost	33°21′50″N 069°57′25″E	
OASN	SGA	Sheghnan Airport	Shighnan	37°34′00″N 071°30′00″E	
OATD		Toorghodi Heliport	Torghundi	35°13′20″N 062°17′27″E	
OATN	TII	Tarinkot Airport	Tarinkot (Tereen)	32°36′17″N 065°51′56″E	
OATQ	TQN	Taloqan Airport	Taloqan	36°46′15″N 069°31′57″E	
OATW		Taywara Airport	Taywara	33°32′36″N 064°25′30″E	
OAUZ	UND	Kunduz Airport	Kunduz	36°39′54″N 068°54′39″E	
OAYL		Yakawlang Airport	Lal wa Sarjangal	34°30′48″N 066°18′11″E	Closed and replaced by OALL
OAYQ		Yangi Qaleh Airport	Yangi Qala District, Takhar Province	37°27′22″N 069°38′27″E	
OAYW		Yawan Airport	Yawan District, Badakhshan	37°33′49″N 070°26′40″E	
OAZI		Camp Bastion Airfield	Helmand near Lashkargah (military)	31°51′06″N 064°11′52″E	
OAZJ	ZAJ	Zaranj Airport	Zaranj	30°58′20″N 061°51′57″E	

== OB - Bahrain ==
Also see airport category and list.

ICAO	IATA	Airport name	Community	Coordinates
OBBI	BAH	Bahrain International Airport	Muharraq	26°16′15″N 050°38′01″E
OBBS		Shaikh Isa Air Base	Qurayn Al Dhirban	25°55′06″N 050°35′26″E
OBKH	KHB	Sakhir Air Base	Sakhir	26°02′02″N 050°31′29″E

== OE - Saudi Arabia ==
Also see airport category and list.

ICAO	IATA	Airport name	Community	Coordinates	Notes
OEAA		Abu Ali Airport	Jubail	27°19′08″N 049°35′12″E	Owned by Aramco
OEAB	AHB	Abha International Airport	Abha	18°14′25″N 042°39′24″E	
OEAD		Aradah Airport	Aradah	21°13′07″N 055°15′44″E	
OEAH	HOF	al-Ahsa International Airport	Hofuf	25°17′07″N 049°29′06″E	
OEAO	ULH	Al-Ula International Airport	Al-'Ula	26°29′00″N 038°07′01″E	
OEBA	ABT	King Saud Domestic Airport	al-Baha	20°17′46″N 041°38′03″E	
OEBH	BHH	Bisha Domestic Airport	Bisha	19°59′03″N 042°37′15″E	
OEBN		Thablotin Airport	Thabalotn	19°49′59″N 054°01′15″E	
OEBQ		Abqaiq Airport	Abqaiq	25°54′42″N 049°35′30″E	Owned by Aramco
OEBT		Batha Airport	Batha	24°12′58″N 051°27′00″E	
OEDF	DMM	King Fahd International Airport	Dammam	26°28′16″N 049°47′55″E	
OEDM		Dawadmi Domestic Airport	Dawadmi	24°26′59″N 044°07′16″E	
OEDR	DHA	King Abdulaziz Air Base	Dhahran	26°15′45″N 050°09′11″E	Formerly Dhahran International Airport
OEGN	GIZ	King Abdullah International Airport	Gizan (also known as Jizan or Jazan.)	16°54′04″N 042°35′09″E	
OEGS	ELQ	Prince Naif bin Abdulaziz International Airport	Buraidah, Gassim (also known as al Gassim or al Qasim)	26°18′10″N 043°46′26″E	
OEGT	URY	Gurayat Domestic Airport	Gurayat (also known as Guriat)	31°24′42″N 037°16′46″E	
OEHL	HAS	Hail International Airport	Ha'il	27°26′16″N 041°41′10″E	
OEHR		Haradh Airport	Haradh	24°06′06″N 049°13′24″E	Owned by Aramco
OEHW		Al-Hawtah Airport	Al-Hawtah	22°58′00″N 046°54′00″E	
OEJB	QJB	Jubail Airport	Jubail	27°02′21″N 049°24′19″E	
OEJF		King Faisal Naval Base	Jeddah	21°20′33″N 039°10′36″E	
OEJL		King Abdulaziz Naval Base	Jubail	26°56′30″N 049°42′15″E	
OEJN	JED	King Abdulaziz International Airport	Jeddah	21°40′46″N 039°09′24″E	
OEKA		Riyadh Khashm Alan Air Base	Riyadh	24°37′14″N 046°55′06″E	
OEKK	KMC	King Saud Air Base	King Khalid Military City	27°54′01″N 045°31′07″E	
OEKM	KMX	King Khalid Air Base	Khamis Mushait	18°18′25″N 042°48′33″E	
OEKN		Khurais Airport	Khurais	25°15′55″N 048°10′42″E	Owned by Aramco
OEKR		Khurais South Airport	Khurais	25°04′10″N 048°11′42″E	
OEMA	MED	Prince Mohammad bin Abdulaziz International Airport	Medina (Mecca)	24°33′12″N 039°42′18″E	
OENG	EAM	Najran Regional Airport	Najran (also known as Nejran)	17°36′41″N 044°25′09″E	
OENN	NUM	Neom Bay Airport	Neom	27°55′30″N 035°17′24″E	
OEOM		Umm Al Melh Border Guards Airport	Um Almelh	19°06′56″N 050°07′44″E	
OEPA	AQI	Qaisumah–Hafar Al-Batin International Airport	Qaisumah (also known as Qaysumah)	28°20′07″N 046°07′30″E	
OEPC		Pump Station 3 Airport	Rimah	25°10′30″N 047°29′18″E	
OEPF		Pump Station 6 Airport	Al-Qurna	24°42′36″N 044°57′54″E	
OEPI		Pump Station 9 Airport	Al-Shawatin	24°16′36″N 042°08′36″E	
OEPJ		Pump Station 10 Airport	Al-Zahimiyah	24°06′24″N 041°02′12″E	
OEPK		IPSA-3 Airport	Al-Sadawi	27°57′00″N 046°44′30″E	Owned by Aramco
OEPS	AKH	Prince Sultan Air Base	Al Kharj	24°03′19″N 047°33′49″E	
OERB		Rabigh Airport	Rabigh	22°42′09″N 039°04′12″E	
OERF	RAH	Rafha Domestic Airport	Rafha	29°37′35″N 043°29′27″E	
OERK	RUH	King Khalid International Airport	Riyadh	24°57′28″N 046°41′56″E	
OERM		Ras Mishab Airport	Ras Mishab	28°04′45″N 048°36′40″E	Military
OERR	RAE	Arar Domestic Airport	Arar (also known as Ar'ar)	30°54′23″N 041°08′17″E	
OERS	RSI	Red Sea International Airport	Hanak	25°37′49″N 037°04′42″E	
OERT		Ras Tanura Airport	Ras Tanura	26°43′24″N 050°01′54″E	Owned by Aramco
OERY	XXN	King Salman Air Base	Riyadh	24°42′35″N 046°43′31″E	Closed 2021
OESB		Shaybah Airport	Shaybah	22°30′54″N 053°57′54″E	Owned by Aramco
OESH	SHW	Sharurah Domestic Airport	Sharurah (also known as Sharorah)	17°28′00″N 047°07′17″E	
OESK	AJF	Al-Jouf International Airport	al-Jouf (also known as al-Jawf)	29°47′06″N 040°06′00″E	
OESL	SLF	Sulayel Airport	As Sulayyil	20°27′53″N 045°37′11″E	
OEST		Shabitah Airport	Shabitah	22°42′32″N 053°17′05″E	
OETB	TUU	Prince Sultan bin Abdulaziz Airport	Tabuk	28°22′23″N 036°37′17″E	
OETF	TIF	Taif International Airport	Ta’if	21°29′00″N 040°32′29″E	
OETH		Thumamah Airport	Ath Thumamah	25°12′47″N 046°38′28″E	
OETN		Ras Tanajib Airport	Tanajib	27°52′06″N 048°46′06″E	Owned by Aramco
OETR	TUI	Turaif Domestic Airport	Turaif	31°41′33″N 038°43′52″E	
OEUD		Udhayliyah Airport	Udhailiyah	25°09′06″N 049°19′42″E	Owned by Aramco
OEUM		Ummlejj Airport	Ummlejj	25°16′52″N 037°12′18″E	
OEWD	WAE	Wadi al-Dawasir Domestic Airport	Wadi al-Dawasir	20°30′15″N 045°11′58″E	
OEWJ	EJH	Al-Wajh Domestic Airport	Wedjh (also known as Wejh)	26°11′54″N 036°28′34″E	
OEYN	YNB	Prince Abdulmohsen Bin Abdulaziz International Airport	Yanbu (also known as Yenbo)	24°08′39″N 038°03′48″E	
OEZL	ZUL	Zilfi Airport	Al Zulfi	26°21′00″N 044°49′59″E	Closed

== OI - Iran ==
Also see airport category and list.

ICAO	IATA	Airport name	Community	Coordinates	Notes
OIAA	ABD	Abadan Ayatollah Jami International Airport	Abadan	30°21′55″N 048°13′59″E	
OIAD	DEF	Dezful Airport	Dezful	32°26′04″N 048°23′52″E	
OIAE		Valiasr Hospital Heliport	Behbahan	30°36′40″N 050°12′17″E	Closed
OIAG		Aghajari Airport	Aghajari	30°44′40″N 049°40′37″E	
OIAH	GCH	Gachsaran Airport	Dogonbadan	30°20′15″N 050°49′41″E	
OIAI	QMJ	Shahid Asiyaee Airport	Masjed Soleyman	32°00′09″N 049°16′13″E	
OIAJ	OMI	Omidiyeh Air Base	Omidiyeh	30°50′07″N 049°32′06″E	
OIAM	MRX	Mahshahr Airport	Mahshahr	30°33′22″N 049°09′07″E	
OIAW	AWZ	Qasem Soleimani International Airport (Lieutenant General Qasem Soleimani International Airport)	Ahwaz	31°20′15″N 048°45′43″E	
OIBA	AEU	Abu Musa Airport	Abu Musa	25°52′32″N 055°01′58″E	
OIBB	BUZ	Bushehr Airport	Bushehr	28°56′41″N 050°50′05″E	
OIBH	IAQ	Bahregan Air Base	Emam Hasan	29°50′38″N 050°58′33″E	
OIBI	YEH	Asalouyeh Airport	Asalouyeh	27°28′53″N 052°36′55″E	Military, Closed
OIBJ	KNR	Jam Airport	Bandar Kangan	27°49′14″N 052°21′07″E	
OIBK	KIH	Kish International Airport	Kish Island	26°31′34″N 053°58′49″E	
OIBL	BDH	Bandar Lengeh Airport	Bandar Lengeh	26°31′55″N 054°49′29″E	
OIBP	PGU	Persian Gulf Airport	Khalije Fars, Assaluyeh	27°22′46″N 052°44′15″E	
OIBQ	KHK	Khark Airport	Kharg	29°15′34″N 050°19′24″E	
OIBS	SXI	Sirri Island Airport	Sirri Island	25°54′32″N 054°32′22″E	
OIBV	LVP	Lavan Airport	Lavan Island	26°48′37″N 053°21′22″E	
OIBX		Tunb Airport	Greater and Lesser Tunbs	26°15′33″N 055°18′57″E	
OICC	KSH	Kermanshah Airport (Shahid Ashrafi Esfahani Airport)	Kermanshah	34°20′45″N 047°09′29″E	
OICD		Abdanan Airport	Abdanan	32°56′04″N 047°29′00″E	
OICI	IIL	Ilam Airport	Ilam	33°35′12″N 046°24′17″E	
OICK	KHD	Khorramabad Airport	Khorramabad	33°26′09″N 048°16′54″E	
OICS	SDG	Sanandaj Airport	Sanandaj	35°14′45″N 047°00′33″E	
OIFE	IFH	Hesa Air Base	Isfahan (Esfahan)	32°55′44″N 051°33′40″E	
OIFH		Shahid Vatan Pour Air Base	Isfahan	32°34′01″N 051°41′30″E	
OIFK	KKS	Kashan Airport	Kashan	33°53′43″N 051°34′37″E	
OIFP		Badr Air Base	Isfahan (Esfahan)	32°45′03″N 051°51′40″E	
OIFM	IFN	Isfahan International Airport (Esfahan Shahid Beheshti Int'l)	Isfahan (Esfahan)	32°37′16″N 051°41′49″E	
OIFS	CQD	Shahrekord Shahid Estaki International Airport	Shahrekord	32°17′50″N 050°50′32″E	
OIFV		ZarrinShahr Airport	Zarrin Shahr	32°19′38″N 051°22′38″E	
OIGG	RAS	Rasht Airport (Sardar Jangal Airport)	Rasht	37°19′31″N 049°36′21″E	
OIHH	HDM	Hamadan International Airport	Hamadan	34°52′09″N 048°33′09″E	
OIHR	AJK	Arak International Airport	Arak	34°08′17″N 049°50′50″E	
OIHS	NUJ	Hamedan Air Base (Shahrokhi Air Base)	Hamadan	35°12′42″N 048°39′12″E	
OIIA		Qazvin-Azadi Airport	Qarpuzabad	35°57′08″N 050°27′03″E	
OIIB		Boland Parvaz Airport	Eyvanki	35°21′40″N 051°59′23″E	
OIIC		Kushke Nosrat Airport	Qom Province	34°59′02″N 050°48′22″E	
OIID		Doshan Tappeh Air Base	Tehran	35°42′11″N 051°28′30″E	
OIIE	IKA	Imam Khomeini International Airport	Tehran	35°24′58″N 051°09′08″E	
OIIF		Fath Air Base	Karaj	35°43′02″N 050°56′07″E	
OIIG		Ghale Morghi Airport	Tehran	35°38′41″N 051°22′51″E	
OIII	THR	Mehrabad International Airport	Tehran	35°41′21″N 051°18′49″E	
OIIK	GZW	Qazvin Airport	Qazvin	36°14′24″N 050°02′50″E	
OIIM		Naja Air Base	Karaj	35°46′35″N 050°52′52″E	
OIIO		PANHA Heliport	Tehran	35°41′55″N 051°19′38″E	
OIIP	PYK	Payam International Airport	Karaj	35°46′34″N 050°49′36″E	
OIIQ		Qom International Airport	Qom	34°34′50″N 050°38′53″E	Under construction
OIIR		Garmsar Airport	Garmsar	35°10′27″N 052°19′24″E	
OIIS	SNX	Semnan Municipal Airport	Semnan	35°35′41″N 053°29′43″E	
OIKB	BND	Bandar Abbas International Airport	Bandar Abbas	27°13′05″N 056°22′40″E	
OIKJ	JYR	Jiroft Airport	Jiroft	28°43′37″N 057°40′13″E	
OIKK	KER	Ayatollah Hashemi Rafsanjani Airport	Kerman	30°16′28″N 056°57′04″E	
OIKM	BXR	Bam Airport	Bam	29°05′03″N 058°27′00″E	
OIKP	HDR	Havadarya Airport	Bandar Abbas	27°09′30″N 056°10′21″E	
OIKQ	GSM	Qeshm International Airport	Dayrestan	26°45′17″N 055°54′08″E	
OIKR	RJN	Rafsanjan Airport	Rafsanjan	30°17′52″N 056°03′04″E	
OIKY	SYJ	Sirjan Airport	Sirjan	29°33′01″N 055°39′55″E	
OIMB	XBJ	Birjand Airport	Birjand	32°53′33″N 059°17′00″E	
OIMC	CKT	Sarakhs Airport	Sarakhs	36°30′04″N 061°03′54″E	
OIMG		Golbahar Airport	Mashhad	36°36′29″N 059°11′36″E	
OIMJ	RUD	Shahroud Airport	Shahrud	36°25′30″N 055°06′17″E	
OIMM	MHD	Mashhad Shahid Hasheminejad International Airport	Mashhad	36°14′06″N 059°38′27″E	
OIMN	BJB	Bojnourd Airport	Bojnourd	37°29′35″N 057°18′30″E	
OIMQ		Kashmar UltraLight Airport	Kashmar	35°26′04″N 058°50′57″E	
OIMS	AFZ	Sabzevar Airport	Sabzevar	36°10′05″N 057°35′43″E	
OIMT	TCX	Tabas Airport	Tabas	33°40′03″N 056°53′33″E	
OIMX		Soga Air Base	Soga	37°37′40″N 056°10′23″E	
OINB		Babolsar Airport	Babolsar	36°43′12″N 052°39′00″E	Closed
OINE	KLM	Kalaleh Airport	Kalaleh	37°23′00″N 055°27′07″E	
OING	GBT	Gorgan Airport	Gorgan	36°54′34″N 054°24′05″E	
OINJ	BSM	Bishe Kola Air Base	Amol	36°39′19″N 052°20′59″E	
OINN	NSH	Noshahr Airport	Noshahr	36°39′48″N 051°27′53″E	
OINR	RZR	Ramsar International Airport	Ramsar	36°54′36″N 050°40′47″E	
OINZ	SRY	Dasht-e Naz Airport	Sari	36°38′09″N 053°11′37″E	
OISA		Abadeh Airport	Abadeh	31°01′54″N 052°47′23″E	
OISD		Darab Airport	Darab	28°43′18″N 054°26′29″E	
OISF	FAZ	Fasa Airport	Fasa	28°53′30″N 053°43′24″E	
OISJ	JAR	Jahrom International Airport	Jahrom	28°35′12″N 053°34′45″E	
OISL	LRR	Larestan Ayatollah Ayatollahi International Airport	Lar	27°40′23″N 054°22′53″E	
OISO		Zarqan Airport	Zarqan	29°45′15″N 052°41′39″E	
OISR	LFM	Lamerd International Airport	Lamerd	27°22′22″N 053°11′20″E	
OISS	SYZ	Shiraz Shahid Dastgheib International Airport	Shiraz	29°32′21″N 052°35′24″E	
OISY	YES	Yasuj Airport	Yasuj	30°42′02″N 051°32′42″E	
OISZ		Firuzabad Airport	Firuzabad	35°31′48″N 051°30′21″E	
OITH	KHA	Khaneh Airport	Piranshahr (Khaneh)	36°43′45″N 045°09′29″E	Closed
OITK	KHY	Khoy Airport	Khoy	38°25′39″N 044°58′25″E	
OITL	ADU	Ardabil Airport	Ardabil	38°19′32″N 048°25′27″E	
OITM	ACP	Sahand Airport	Bonab	37°20′53″N 046°07′40″E	
OITP	PFQ	Parsabad-Moghan Airport	Parsabad	39°36′13″N 047°52′53″E	
OITR	OMH	Urmia Shahid Bakeri International Airport	Urmia	37°40′05″N 045°04′07″E	
OITS	TQZ	Saqqez Airport	Saqqez	36°13′06″N 046°17′56″E	
OITT	TBZ	Tabriz Shahid Madani International Airport	Tabriz	38°08′02″N 046°14′06″E	
OITU	IMQ	Maku International Airport	Maku	39°11′33″N 044°55′31″E	
OITZ	JWN	Zanjan Airport	Zanjan	36°46′25″N 048°21′34″E	
OIYP		Pardis Airport	Yazd	31°59′17″N 054°23′00″E	
OIYR		Imam Reza Airport	Mehriz	31°41′39″N 054°34′32″E	
OIYY	AZD	Shahid Sadooghi Airport	Yazd	31°54′18″N 054°16′35″E	
OIZB	ACZ	Zabol Airport	Zabol	31°05′54″N 061°32′38″E	
OIZC	ZBR	Chabahar/Konarak International Airport	Chabahar	25°26′36″N 060°22′55″E	
OIZH	ZAH	Zahedan Airport	Zahedan	29°28′32″N 060°54′22″E	
OIZI	IHR	Iranshahr Airport	Iranshahr	27°14′09″N 060°43′13″E	
OIZJ	JSK	Jask Airport	Jask	25°39′13″N 057°47′57″E	
OIZS		Saravan Airport	Saravan	27°25′08″N 062°18′59″E	

== OJ - Jordan ==
Also see airport category and list.

ICAO	IATA	Airport name	Community	Coordinates
OJAI	AMM	Queen Alia International Airport	Amman	31°43′21″N 035°59′36″E
OJAM	ADJ	Amman City Airport	Amman	31°58′21″N 035°59′29″E
OJAQ	AQJ	King Hussein International Airport	Aqaba	29°36′42″N 035°01′05″E
OJKA		King Abdullah II Air Base	Zarqa	32°00′19″N 036°13′26″E
OJKF		King Faisal Air Base	Al-Jafr	30°20′35″N 036°08′51″E
OJMF	OMF	King Hussein Air Base	Mafraq	32°21′23″N 036°15′33″E
OJMS		Muwaffaq Salti Air Base	Azraq	31°50′03″N 036°47′14″E
OJPH		Prince Hassan Air Base	Safawi	32°09′39″N 037°08′59″E
OJRW		H-4 Air Base	Ruwaished	32°32′20″N 038°11′45″E

== OK - Kuwait ==
Also see airport category and list.

ICAO	IATA	Airport name	Community	Coordinates
OKAJ	XIJ	Ahmad al-Jaber Air Base	Al Abdiliya	28°56′05″N 047°47′31″E
OKAS		Ali Al Salem Air Base	Al Abaireq - Al Anaem - Al Laiyah	29°20′48″N 047°31′14″E
OKBK	KWI	Kuwait International Airport	Kuwait City	29°13′36″N 047°58′48″E
OKDI		Camp Buehring	As Syer - Um Al Medfaa	29°41′51″N 047°26′09″E
OKNB		Kuwait Naval Base	Camp Patriot	28°51′52″N 048°16′22″E

== OL - Lebanon ==
Also see airport category and list.

ICAO	IATA	Airport name	Community	Coordinates
OLBA	BEY	Beirut–Rafic Hariri International Airport	Beirut	33°49′16″N 035°29′18″E
OLKA	KYE	René Mouawad Airport	Qlayaat	34°35′22″N 036°00′41″E
OLRA		Rayak Air Base	Rayak	33°51′08″N 035°59′25″E

== OM - United Arab Emirates ==
Also see airport category and list.

ICAO	IATA	Airport name	Community	Coordinates
OMAA	AUH	Zayed International Airport	Abu Dhabi	24°25′59″N 054°39′04″E
OMAB		Buhasa Airport	Buhasa	23°35′59″N 053°22′46″E
OMAC		Asab Heliport	Asab	23°17′53″N 054°13′18″E
OMAD	AZI	Al Bateen Executive Airport	Abu Dhabi	24°25′42″N 054°27′29″E
OMAF		Futaysi Airport	Al Futaisi	24°22′44″N 054°18′58″E
OMAJ		Jebel Dhana Airport	Jebel Dhana	24°10′55″N 052°37′25″E
OMAL	AAN	Al Ain International Airport	Al Ain	24°15′42″N 055°36′33″E
OMAM	DHF	Al Dhafra Air Base	Muqatra	24°14′54″N 054°32′42″E
OMAQ		Qarnayn Airport	Qarnayn	24°56′00″N 052°51′00″E
OMAR		Arzanah Airport	Arzanah	24°46′51″N 052°33′35″E
OMAS		Das Island Airport	Das Island	25°08′30″N 052°52′20″E
OMAW		Sweihan Air Base	Zayed Military City	24°31′08″N 054°58′48″E
OMAZ		Zirku Airport	Zirku Island	24°51′48″N 053°04′33″E
OMBY	XSB	Sir Bani Yas Airport	Sir Bani Yas	24°16′56″N 052°34′56″E
OMDB	DXB	Dubai International Airport	Dubai	25°15′10″N 055°21′52″E
OMDL	ZDY	Dalma Airport	Dalma	24°30′11″N 052°20′09″E
OMDM	NHD	Al Minhad Air Base	Dubai	25°01′37″N 055°21′58″E
OMDW	DWC	Al Maktoum International Airport	Dubai	24°55′06″N 055°10′32″E
OMFJ	FJR	Fujairah International Airport	Fujairah	25°06′44″N 056°19′27″E
OMNK		Sas Al Nakhl Air Base	Abu Dhabi	24°26′12″N 054°31′07″E
OMRJ		Al Jazeirah Airport (private)	Al Jazirah Al Hamra	25°39′55″N 055°46′27″E
OMRK	RKT	Ras Al Khaimah International Airport	Ras al-Khaimah	25°36′48″N 055°56′20″E
OMRS		Al Saqr Field Airport (private)	Ras al-Khaimah	25°36′48″N 055°57′34″E
OMSJ	SHJ	Sharjah International Airport	Sharjah	25°19′43″N 055°31′02″E

== OO - Oman ==
Also see airport category and list.

ICAO	IATA	Airport name	Community	Coordinates	Notes
OOAD	AOM	Adam Airport (proposed civil airport)	Adam	22°29′35″N 057°22′55″E	
OOBB		Butabul Airport	Ramlat Bu Tabul	21°10′40″N 055°27′50″E	
OOBR	RMB	Buraimi Airport	Al-Buraimi	24°14′30″N 055°47′00″E	
OODQ	DQM	Duqm Airport	Duqm	19°30′00″N 057°38′35″E	
OOFD	FAU	Fahud Airport	Fahud	22°21′20″N 056°29′00″E	
OOFQ		Firq Air Base	Nizwa	22°52′09″N 057°32′36″E	Closed
OOGB	RNM	Qarn Alam Airport	Qarn Alam	21°22′40″N 057°03′20″E	
OOHA		Haima Airport	Haima	19°58′30″N 056°17′00″E	
OOIA		Ibra Airport	Ibra	22°44′00″N 058°30′50″E	
OOII		Ibri Airport	Ibri	23°11′10″N 056°26′00″E	
OOIZ		Izki Air Base	Izki	22°53′30″N 057°45′30″E	
OOJA	JNJ	Ja'Aluni Airport	Duqm	19°28′50″N 057°18′40″E	
OOKB	KHS	Khasab Airport/Khasab Air Base	Khasab	26°10′15″N 056°14′26″E	
OOLK	LKW	Lekhwair Airport	Lekhwair	22°48′20″N 055°22′30″E	
OOMA	MSH	RAFO Masirah	Masirah	20°40′31″N 058°53′25″E	
OOMK	UKH	Mukhaizna Airport	Mukhaizna Oil Field	19°23′24″N 056°23′52″E	
OOMN		RAFO Musannah	Barka	23°38′29″N 057°29′25″E	
OOMS	MCT	Muscat International Airport	Muscat	23°35′36″N 058°17′04″E	
OOMX	OMM	Marmul Airport	Marmul Heavy Oil Field	18°08′20″N 055°10′40″E	
OORH		Ras al Hadd Airport	Ras al Hadd	22°15′53″N 059°44′32″E	
OORQ	MNH	Rustaq Airport	Rustaq	23°38′20″N 057°29′20″E	
OOSA	SLL	Salalah International Airport	Salalah	17°02′20″N 054°05′32″E	
OOSH	OHS	Sohar Airport	Sohar	24°23′10″N 056°37′32″E	
OOSQ		Saiq Airport	Saiq	23°04′30″N 057°38′30″E	
OOSR	SUH	Sur Airport	Sur	22°32′10″N 059°28′40″E	
OOTH	TTH	RAFO Thumrait	Thumrait	17°39′57″N 054°01′28″E	
OOYB		Yibal Airport	Yibal	22°12′00″N 056°02′00″E	

== OP - Pakistan ==
Also see airport category and list.

ICAO	IATA	Airport name	Community	Coordinates	Notes
OPAB		Abbottabad Airport	Abbottabad	34°09′00″N 073°13′00″E	Closed
OPBN	BNP	Bannu Airport	Bannu	32°58′19″N 070°31′27″E	
OPBW	BHV	Bahawalpur Airport	Bahawalpur	29°20′53″N 071°43′04″E	
OPCH	CJL	Chitral Airport	Chitral	35°52′54″N 071°47′53″E	
OPCL	CHB	Chilas Airport	Chilas	35°25′37″N 074°05′06″E	
OPDB	DBA	Dalbandin Airport	Dalbandin	28°52′30″N 064°24′16″E	
OPDG	DEA	Dera Ghazi Khan Airport	Dera Ghazi Khan	29°57′39″N 070°29′09″E	
OPDI	DSK	Dera Ismail Khan Airport	Dera Ismail Khan	31°54′33″N 070°53′47″E	
OPFA	LYP	Faisalabad International Airport	Faisalabad	31°21′54″N 072°59′41″E	
OPGD		Gwadar International Airport	Gwadar	25°13′56″N 062°19′38″E	Closed
OPGT	GIL	Gilgit Airport	Gilgit	35°55′07″N 074°20′01″E	
OPGW	GWD	New Gwadar International Airport	Gwadar	25°17′51″N 062°30′03″E	
OPIS	ISB	Islamabad International Airport	Islamabad-Rawalpindi	33°33′57″N 072°49′32″E	
OPJA	JAG	PAF Base Shahbaz (Jacobabad Airport)	Jacobabad	28°17′03″N 068°26′59″E	
OPJI	JIW	Jiwani Airport	Jiwani	25°04′04″N 061°48′20″E	
OPKC	KHI	Jinnah International Airport	Karachi	24°54′24″N 067°09′39″E	
OPKD	HDD	Hyderabad Airport	Hyderabad	25°19′06″N 068°22′00″E	
OPKH	KDD	Khuzdar Airport	Khuzdar	27°47′40″N 066°38′25″E	
OPKT	OHT	PAF Base Kohat	Kohat	33°34′14″N 071°26′22″E	
OPKW	KCF	Kadanwari Airport	Kadanwari gas field	27°12′23″N 069°09′23″E	
OPLA	LHE	Allama Iqbal International Airport	Lahore	31°31′17″N 074°24′14″E	
OPLH		Walton Airport	Lahore	31°29′41″N 074°20′46″E	
OPMA	XJM	Mangla Airport	Mangla	33°03′00″N 073°38′18″E	
OPMF	MFG	Muzaffarabad Airport	Muzaffarabad	34°20′21″N 073°30′31″E	
OPMI	MWD	PAF Base M.M. Alam	Mianwali	32°33′47″N 071°34′15″E	
OPMJ	MJD	Moenjodaro Airport	Mohenjo-daro	27°20′07″N 068°08′35″E	
OPMP	MPD	Sindhri Airport	Sindhri	25°41′03″N 069°04′31″E	
OPMR	MSR	PAF Base Masroor (Karachi Air Base)	Karachi	24°53′37″N 066°56′20″E	
OPMS	MNS	PAF Base Minhas (Kamra Air Base)	Kamra	33°52′08″N 072°24′03″E	
OPMT	MUX	Multan International Airport	Multan	30°12′12″N 071°25′09″E	
OPNH	WNS	Nawabshah Airport	Nawabshah	26°13′10″N 068°23′24″E	
OPOR	ORW	Ormara Airport	Ormara	25°16′29″N 064°35′10″E	
OPPC	PAJ	Parachinar Airport	Parachinar	33°54′10″N 070°04′17″E	
OPPG	PJG	Panjgur Airport	Panjgur	26°57′17″N 064°07′57″E	
OPPI	PSI	Pasni Airport	Pasni City	25°17′26″N 063°20′43″E	
OPPS	PEW	Bacha Khan International Airport	Peshawar	33°59′38″N 071°30′53″E	
OPQS	DHM	Dhamial Army Airbase	Rawalpindi	33°33′37″N 073°02′00″E	
OPQT	UET	Quetta International Airport	Quetta	30°14′24″N 066°56′24″E	
OPRK	RYK	Shaikh Zayed International Airport	Rahim Yar Khan	28°23′02″N 070°16′47″E	
OPRN	NRK	PAF Base Nur Khan	Rawalpindi	33°36′59″N 073°05′57″E	
OPRQ	RAF	PAF Base Rafiqui (Shorkot Air Base)	Shorkot	33°45′29″N 072°16′57″E	
OPRS		PAF Academy	Risalpur	34°04′52″N 071°58′21″E	
OPRT	RAZ	Rawalakot Airport	Rawalakot	33°50′59″N 073°47′54″E	
OPSB	SBQ	Sibi Airport	Sibi	29°34′28″N 067°50′35″E	
OPSD	KDU	Skardu Airport	Skardu	35°20′08″N 075°32′10″E	
OPSF	FSL	PAF Base Faisal	Karachi	24°52′42″N 067°06′56″E	
OPSK	SKD	Sukkur Airport (Begum Nusrat Bhutto Airport Sukkur)	Sukkur	27°43′19″N 068°47′30″E	
OPSN	SYW	Sehwan Sharif Airport	Sehwan Sharif	26°28′23″N 067°43′02″E	
OPSR	MSF	PAF Base Mushaf (Sargodha Air Base)	Sargodha	32°02′55″N 072°39′55″E	
OPSS	SDT	Saidu Sharif Airport	Saidu Sharif	34°48′48″N 072°21′10″E	
OPST	SKT	Sialkot International Airport	Sialkot	32°32′08″N 074°21′50″E	
OPSU	SUL	Sui Airport	Sui	28°38′43″N 069°10′37″E	
OPSW	RZS	Sawan Airport	Sawan Gas Field	26°57′34″N 068°52′26″E	
OPTA	TLB	Tarbela Dam Airport	Tarbela Dam	33°59′10″N 072°36′41″E	
OPTU	TUK	Turbat International Airport	Turbat	25°59′10″N 063°01′48″E	
OPZB	PZH	Zhob Airport	Zhob	31°21′30″N 069°27′49″E	

== OR - Iraq and Kurdistan ==
Also see airport category and list.

ICAO	IATA	Airport name	Community	Coordinates	
ORAA	IQA	Al Asad Airbase	Al Anbar	33°48′00″N 042°26′00″E	
ORAI		Al Iskandariya Airport	Iskandariya	32°58′12″N 044°16′12″E	
ORAN		An Numaniyah Airport	An Numaniyah	32°30′09″N 045°19′54″E	
ORAT	TQD	Al Taqaddum Airbase	Habbaniyah	33°20′22″N 043°35′24″E	
ORBB	BMN	Bamarni Airport	Bamarni - Kurdistan	37°05′56″N 043°16′00″E	
ORBD		Balad Air Base (Al-Bakir Airbase)	Balad	33°56′00″N 044°22′00″E	
ORBI	BGW	Baghdad International Airport	Baghdad	33°15′45″N 044°14′04″E	Was ORBS before 2003
ORBM	OSM	Mosul International Airport	Mosul	36°18′21″N 043°08′51″E	
ORBR		Bashur/Harir Air Base	Kurdistan	36°31′37″N 044°20′50″E	
ORER	EBL	Erbil International Airport	Erbil (Hewlêr), - Kurdistan	36°14′15″N 043°57′47″E	
ORJA		Jalibah Southeast Air Base	Jalibah	30°32′29″N 046°36′04″E	
ORKK	KIK	Kirkuk Airport (Al-Hurriya Air Base)	Kirkuk	35°28′10″N 044°20′56″E	
ORMM	BSR	Basrah International Airport	Basrah	30°32′56″N 047°39′45″E	
ORNI	NJF	Al Najaf International Airport	Najaf	31°59′23″N 044°24′15″E	
ORQT		Qasr Tall Airport	Qasr Tal Mihl	33°18′24″N 044°14′33″E	
ORQW		Qayyarah Airfield West	Qayyarah	35°45′57″N 043°07′18″E	
ORSH		Camp Speicher (Majid al Tamimi Airbase/Tikrit Air Academy)	Tikrit	34°40′39″N 043°33′02″E	
ORSJ		Sulaimaniyah Jalal Talabani International Airport	Sulaimaniyah (Silêmanî) - Kurdistan	35°33′39″N 045°18′52″E	
ORTF		Tal Afar Air Base	Tal Afar	36°17′04″N 042°24′17″E	
ORTI		Camp Taji (Camp Cooke)	Taji	33°31′46″N 044°16′39″E	
ORTK		Tikrit East Airport	Tikrit	34°36′30″N 043°46′33″E	
ORTL	XNH	Nasiriyah International Airport (formerly Tallil Air Base)	Nasiriyah	30°56′23″N 046°05′33″E	
ORTS		Tikrit South Airport	Tikrit	34°32′06″N 043°40′42″E	
ORUB		Ubaydah Bin Al Jarrah Air Base	Al-Kut	32°29′01″N 045°45′21″E	
ORUQ		Umm Qasr Airport	Umm Qasr	30°01′12″N 047°55′24″E	
ORWH		Washington Army Heliport	Baghdad	33°18′16″N 044°24′13″E	

== OS - Syria ==
Also see airport category and list.

ICAO	IATA	Airport name	Community	Coordinates
OSAP	ALP	Aleppo International Airport	Aleppo	36°10′50″N 037°13′27″E
OSDI	DAM	Damascus International Airport	Damascus	33°24′41″N 036°30′56″E
OSDZ	DEZ	Deir ez-Zor Airport	Deir ez-Zor	35°17′07″N 040°10′33″E
OSKL	KAC	Qamishli International Airport	Qamishli	37°01′14″N 041°11′29″E
OSLK	LTK	Latakia International Airport	Latakia	35°24′03″N 035°56′55″E
OSPR	PMS	Palmyra Airport	Palmyra	34°33′27″N 038°19′01″E

== OT - Qatar ==
Also see airport category and list.

ICAO	IATA	Airport name	Community	Coordinates
OTBD	DIA	Doha International Airport	Doha	25°15′40″N 051°33′54″E
OTBH	XJD	Al Udeid Air Base (Abu Nakhlah Airport)	Doha	25°07′02″N 051°18′53″E
OTBK		Al Khor Airport	Al Khor	25°37′46″N 051°30′24″E
OTBT		Dukhan Air Base	Dukhan	25°28′04″N 051°00′05″E
OTHH	DOH	Hamad International Airport	Doha	25°15′40″N 051°36′48″E

== OY - Yemen ==
Also see airport category and list.

ICAO	IATA	Airport name	Community	Coordinates	Notes
OYAA	ADE	Aden International Airport	Aden	12°49′46″N 045°01′44″E	
OYAB	EAB	Abbs Airport	Abbs	16°00′40″N 043°10′40″E	
OYAT	AXK	Ataq Airport	Ataq	14°33′04″N 046°49′34″E	
OYBA		Al Badie Airport	Rumah District	18°43′10″N 050°50′13″E	
OYBI	BYD	Al Bayda' Airport	Al Bayda	14°06′20″N 045°26′25″E	
OYBN	BHN	Beihan Airport	Beihan	14°46′55″N 045°43′12″E	
OYBQ	BUK	Albuq Airport	Al Bough	17°21′00″N 044°37′30″E	
OYGD	AAY	Al Ghaydah Airport	Al-Ghaidah	16°11′30″N 052°10′30″E	
OYHD	HOD	Hodeidah International Airport	Hodeidah	14°45′11″N 042°58′35″E	
OYKM	KAM	Kamaran Airport	Kamaran	15°21′40″N 042°36′40″E	
OYMB	MYN	Marib Airport	Marib	15°28′10″N 045°19′40″E	Construction suspended
OYMK		Mokha International Airport	Mokha	13°17′53″N 043°13′55″E	
OYMS	UKR	Mukeiras Airport	Mukeiras	13°56′10″N 045°39′20″E	
OYQN	IHN	Qishn Airport	Qishn	15°25′01″N 051°40′59″E	Closed
OYRN	RIY	Riyan International Airport	Mukalla	14°39′45″N 049°22′30″E	
OYRT	TTV	Barat Airport	Bimhayr	16°43′59″N 044°21′00″E	Closed
OYSF		As Salif Airport	Al Qaryah	15°18′00″N 042°40′59″E	Closed
OYSH	SYE	Saadah Airport	Saadah	16°58′00″N 043°43′45″E	
OYSN	SAH	Sanaa International Airport	Sana'a	15°28′35″N 044°13′11″E	
OYSQ	SCT	Socotra Airport	Socotra	12°37′50″N 053°54′20″E	
OYSY	GXF	Seiyun Hadhramaut Airport	Sayun	15°57′58″N 048°47′17″E	
OYTZ	TAI	Ta'izz International Airport	Taiz	13°41′09″N 044°08′21″E	
OYZM		Al Hazm Airport	Al Hazm	16°12′23″N 044°47′24″E	
