= List of airports in Oman =

This is a list of airports in Oman, grouped by type and sorted by location.

== Airports ==
Airport names shown in bold indicate the airport has scheduled service on commercial airlines.

Airport name	IATA	City served	ICAO
		**Civil airports**	
Adam Airport	AOM	Adam	OOAD
Butabul Airport		Butabul	OOBB
Buraimi Airport	RMB	Buraimi	OOBR
Dibba Airport	BYB	Dibba Al-Baya	
**Duqm Airport**	DQM	Duqm	OODQ
Ja'Aluni Airport	JNJ	Duqm	OOJA
Fahud Airport	FAU	Fahud	OOFD
Qarn Alam Airport	RNM	Qarn Alam	OOGB
Haima Airport		Haima	OOHA
Ibra Airport		Ibra	OOIA
Ibri Airport		Ibri	OOII
Khasab Airport/Khasab Air Base	KHS	Khasab	OOKB
Lekhwair Airport	LKW	Lekhwair	OOLK
Marmul Airport	OMM	Marmul Heavy Oil Field	OOMX
Mukhaizna Airport	UKH	Mukhaizna	OOMK
**Muscat International Airport**	MCT	Muscat	OOMS
Ras al Hadd Airport		Ras al Hadd	OORH
Rustaq Airport	MNH	Rustaq	OORQ
Saiq Airport		Saiq	OOSQ
**Salalah International Airport**	SLL	Salalah	OOSA
**Sohar Airport**	OHS	Sohar	OOSH
Sur Airport	SUH	Sur	OOSR
Yibal Airport		Yibal	OOYB
		**Military airports**	
Izki Air Base		Izki	OOIZ
Manston Air Base		Manston	
**RAFO Masirah**	MSH	Masirah	OOMA
RAFO Musannah	MNH	Musannah	OOMN
RAFO Thumrait	TTH	Thumrait	OOTH

== See also ==
- Transport in Oman
- List of airports by ICAO code: O#OO - Oman
- Wikipedia:WikiProject Aviation/Airline destination lists: Asia#Oman
