= Firq Air Base =

Firq Air Base/Nizwa Airport
- IATA: none; ICAO: OOFQ/OONZ

Summary
- Airport type: Public
- Serves: Nizwa
- Elevation AMSL: 1,560 ft / 475 m
- Coordinates: 22°52′00″N 57°32′40″E

Map
- Location of the airport in Oman

Runways
Direction	Length		Surface
Direction	ft	m	Surface
13/31 (Demolished)

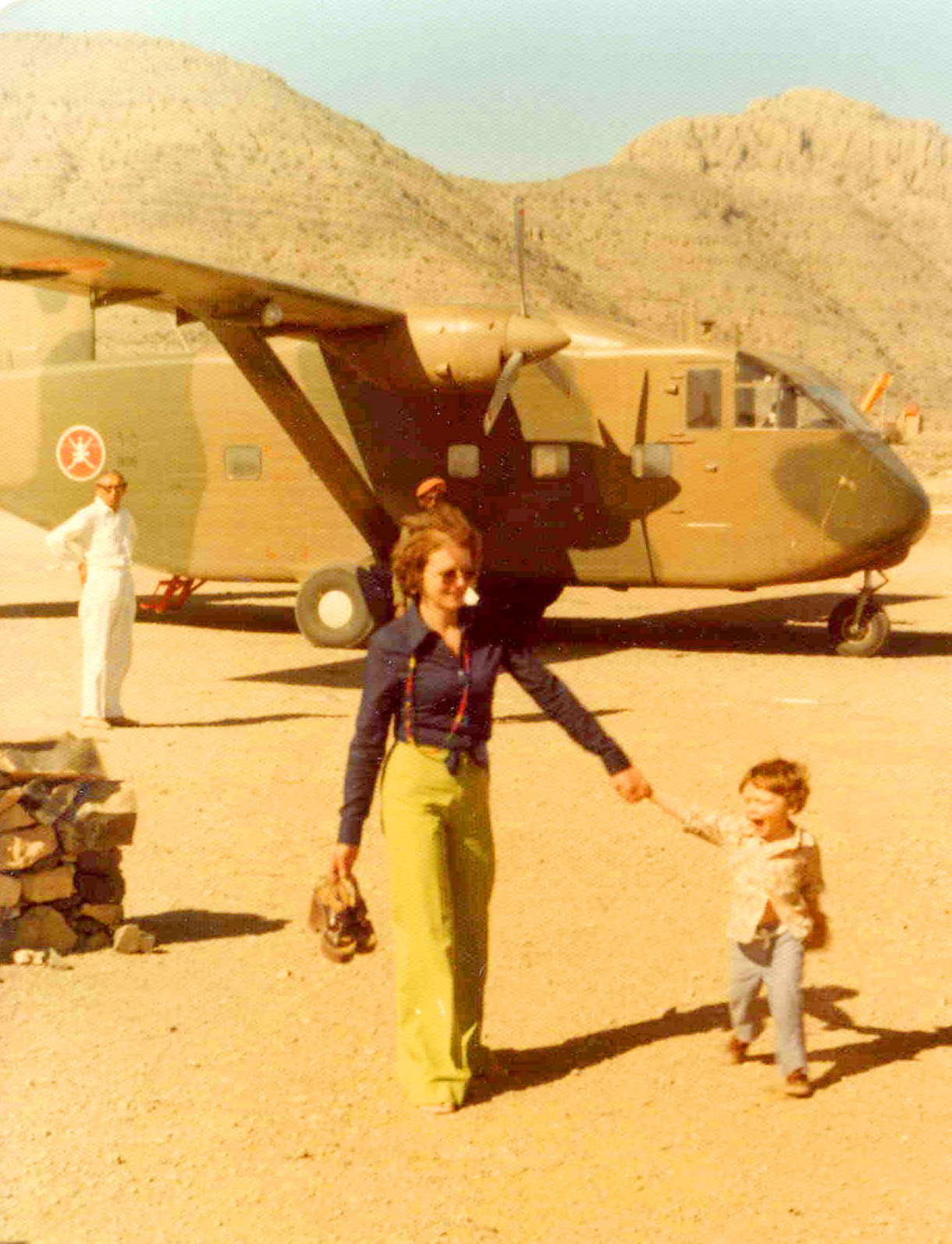
Sue and Warwick called forward to the waiting Land Rovers. With a plane in the background.

Firq Air Base/Nizwa Airport was an airport serving the city of Nizwa in Oman.

Per Google Earth historical imagery, the runway was demolished sometime after 2009.

== See also ==
- List of airports in Oman
- Transport in Oman
