= Fahud Airport =

Airport in Oman

- IATA: FAU; ICAO: OOFD

Summary
- Airport type: Public
- Serves: Fahud, Oman
- Elevation AMSL: 552 ft / 168 m
- Coordinates: 22°21′20″N 56°29′00″E

Map
- Location of the airport in Oman FAU (Middle East) FAU (West and Central Asia) FAU (Asia)

Runways
Direction	Length		Surface
Direction	m	ft	Surface
13/31	2,560	8,399	Asphalt
- Source: Google Maps GCM SkyVector

Fahud (IATA: FAU, ICAO: OOFD) is an airport serving the town and petroleum facility of Fahud in Oman. The airport is in the desert 3 kilometres (2 mi) northwest of the town.

The Fahud VOR-DME (Ident: FHD) and non-directional beacon (Ident: FHN) are located on the field.

== See also ==
- Transport in Oman
- List of airports in Oman
