= Military bases of the Sultanic Armed Forces used during the Dhofar rebellion =

The following is a list of Military Bases of the Sultanic Armed Forces (SAF) that were used during the Dhofar rebellion. As with many military operations the British were involved in, the use of nicknames was commonplace and these were used alongside local names:

== Bases ==
SAF Nickname (if used)	Local name	Function during Insurgency	Unit Association	Current SAF use	Geo Coordinates
Operating Bases with a Nickname
Eagle's Nest	Summit of Jebel Samhan	SAS BATT Firqa temporary location	Former Adoo site	Not used	
Manston	Aydam	Airstrip	Forward helicopter and STOL aircraft MOB	Officer and soldier training academy	16°59′23″N 53°21′32″E
Midway	Thumrayt (Thumrait)	Airstrip	Forward helicopter and STOL aircraft MOB, plus SOLF units	Operational RAO and RAFO base	17°38′35″N 54°01′13″E
Raven's Roost	Zeek	SAS BATT Firqa location	Forward helicopter and STOL aircraft MOB	SSF base in the vicinity	17°16′40″N 54°07′16″E
Simba (including Mainbrace (main HQ and fire support base), Capstan & Yardarm positions)	Sarfayt (Sarfait)	Forward infantry and artillery fire base	Infantry battalion group base and STOL airstrip	SAF Base still evident on imagery	16°42′00″N 53°06′32″E
White City	Medinat al Haqq	Firqa base	SAS and SAF	Not used	17°10′42″N 54°14′55″E
Operating Bases using local place name
N/A	Habarut (Habrut)	Border fort	Dhofar Gendarmerie manned fort	Not used now in Yemen	17°18′19″N 52°44′25″E
N/A	Heiron	Fortified village	Baluch Training Centre and manned fort	Not used	17°02′17″N 53°21′27″E
N/A	Makinat Shihan	Border strong point	Dhofar Gendarmerie manned position with some artillery	Not used now in Yemen	17°47′08″N 52°29′05″E
N/A	Mirbat	Fortified coastal town	SAS British Army Training Team (BATT) house and DG/Firqa manned fort	Not used	16°59′31″N 54°41′31″E
N/A	Tawi Atir	Operational & Training base	SAS BATT and Firqa	Not used	17°06′23″N 54°33′32″E
N/A	Umm al Ghawarif (UAG)	A established and substantial operating base	HQ SAF and SAS	Still a SAF HQ and base in Northern Central Salalah	17°01′39″N 54°08′14″E

== Linear defensive positions ==
The following were the nicknames of the north–south blocking defences in western Dhofar:

- Damavand Line (Manston to the coast at Rakhyut)
- Hammer Line (between Midway Road and Hornbeam line)
- Hornbeam Line (stretching 53 km north of Mughsayl)

== Other sites mentioned not yet identified ==
The following are mentioned as operational sites but not yet identified:

- Everest
- Furious
- Stonehenge
