= Marmul Airport =

- IATA: OMM; ICAO: OOMX

Summary
- Airport type: Public
- Serves: Marmul
- Elevation AMSL: 909 ft / 277 m
- Coordinates: 18°08′20″N 55°10′40″E

Map
- Location of the airport in Oman OMM (Middle East) OMM (West and Central Asia) OMM (Asia)

Runways
Direction	Length		Surface
Direction	m	ft	Surface
14/32	2,565	8,415	Asphalt
- Source: Google Maps GCM

Marmul Airport (IATA: OMM, ICAO: OOMX) is an airport serving the Petroleum Development Oman (PDO) operations at the Marmul heavy oil field in the Dhofar Governorate of Oman. The airport is 6 kilometres (3.7 mi) southwest of the main PDO camp.

The Marmul VOR-DME (Ident: MRL) is located on the field.

== Climate ==
Climate data for Marmul Airport, elevation 273 m (896 ft), (2005–2019 normals, extremes 2005–2019)
Month	Jan	Feb	Mar	Apr	May	Jun	Jul	Aug	Sep	Oct	Nov	Dec	Year
Record high °C (°F)	32.3 (90.1)	36.6 (97.9)	39.8 (103.6)	42.5 (108.5)	47.3 (117.1)	47.1 (116.8)	47.6 (117.7)	47.1 (116.8)	45.2 (113.4)	41.6 (106.9)	35.6 (96.1)	31.0 (87.8)	47.6 (117.7)
Mean daily maximum °C (°F)	26.1 (79.0)	28.9 (84.0)	33.0 (91.4)	36.9 (98.4)	39.9 (103.8)	42.5 (108.5)	43.1 (109.6)	42.0 (107.6)	38.9 (102.0)	35.1 (95.2)	31.1 (88.0)	27.8 (82.0)	35.4 (95.8)
Daily mean °C (°F)	19.2 (66.6)	21.7 (71.1)	24.8 (76.6)	28.5 (83.3)	31.3 (88.3)	34.3 (93.7)	35.1 (95.2)	33.6 (92.5)	30.1 (86.2)	27.3 (81.1)	24.2 (75.6)	20.5 (68.9)	27.6 (81.6)
Mean daily minimum °C (°F)	12.5 (54.5)	15.3 (59.5)	17.3 (63.1)	21.4 (70.5)	23.9 (75.0)	26.8 (80.2)	27.7 (81.9)	26.7 (80.1)	23.1 (73.6)	20.6 (69.1)	18.0 (64.4)	14.1 (57.4)	20.6 (69.1)
Record low °C (°F)	4.4 (39.9)	6.4 (43.5)	9.2 (48.6)	14.5 (58.1)	18.4 (65.1)	22.0 (71.6)	22.6 (72.7)	19.4 (66.9)	15.2 (59.4)	14.5 (58.1)	11.5 (52.7)	7.6 (45.7)	4.4 (39.9)
Average precipitation mm (inches)	0.2 (0.01)	5.0 (0.20)	2.0 (0.08)	27.8 (1.09)	22.3 (0.88)	1.7 (0.07)	0.7 (0.03)	8.6 (0.34)	0.1 (0.00)	4.7 (0.19)	1.5 (0.06)	1.5 (0.06)	76.1 (3.01)
Average precipitation days (≥ 1.0 mm)	0.1	0.4	0.3	1.1	1.7	0.3	0.3	0.3	0.0	0.4	0.4	0.3	5.6
Source: Starlings Roost Weather

== See also ==
- Transport in Oman
- List of airports in Oman
