= MNH =

MNH or mnh may refer to:

- Museo Nacional de Historia, a national museum of Mexico
- MNH, the IATA code for Rustaq Airport, Oman
- MNH, the Indian Railways station code for Munsirhat railway station, West Bengal, India
- mnh, the ISO 639-3 code for Mono language (Congo), Democratic Republic of the Congo
