= Yibal Airport =

- IATA: none; ICAO: OOYB

Summary
- Airport type: Public
- Serves: Yibal
- Elevation AMSL: 355 ft / 108 m
- Coordinates: 22°12′00″N 56°02′00″E

Map
- Location of the airport in Oman OOYB (Middle East) OOYB (West and Central Asia) OOYB (Asia)

Runways
Direction	Length		Surface
Direction	ft	m	Surface
11/29	6,660	2,030	Dirt
- Source: Google Maps GCM

Yibal Airport (ICAO: OOYB) is an airport serving the town of Yibal in the Ad Dhahirah Governorate of Oman.

Runway ends are poorly defined, and actual usable length may be longer than listed. The Fahud VOR-DME (Ident: FHD) and non-directional beacon (Ident: FHN) are located 26.6 nautical miles (49 km) east-northeast of the airport.

== See also ==
- List of airports in Oman
- Transport in Oman
