= Sur Airport =

Airport in Oman

Sur Airport مطار صور
- IATA: SUH; ICAO: OOSR

Summary
- Airport type: Public
- Serves: Sur, Oman
- Elevation AMSL: 20 ft / 6 m
- Coordinates: 22°32′10″N 59°28′40″E

Map
- Location of the airport in Oman SUH (Indian Ocean) SUH (Middle East) SUH (West and Central Asia) SUH (Asia)

Runways
Direction	Length		Surface
Direction	m	ft	Surface
06/24	680	2,231	Dirt
02/20	740	2,428	Dirt
- Source: Google Maps GCM

Sur Airport (IATA: SUH, ICAO: OOSR) is an airport serving the Gulf of Oman port of Sur in Oman. The airport is 6 kilometres (4 mi) inland from the ocean and is only rarely used for military aircraft and helicopters.

There is mountainous terrain 6 kilometres (4 mi) south of the airport. The Sur VOR-DME (Ident: SUR) is located 0.8 nautical miles (1.5 km) northeast of the airport.

== See also ==
- Transport in Oman
- List of airports in Oman
