= Ibra Airport =

- IATA: none; ICAO: OOIA

Summary
- Airport type: Public
- Serves: Ibra, Oman
- Elevation AMSL: 1,500 ft / 457 m
- Coordinates: 22°44′00″N 58°30′50″E

Map
- Location of the airport in Oman OOIA (Middle East) OOIA (West and Central Asia) OOIA (Asia)

Runways
Direction	Length		Surface
Direction	m	ft	Surface
16/34	1,855	6,086	Dirt
- Source: Google Maps GCM

Ibra (ICAO: OOIA) is an airport serving Ibra, a town in the Ash Sharqiyah North Governorate of Oman.

The Izki VOR-DME (Ident: IZK) is located 42.6 nautical miles (79 km) west-northwest of the airport. The Seeb VOR-DME (Ident: MCT) is located 53.4 nautical miles (99 km) north-northwest of the airport.

== See also ==
- Transport in Oman
- List of airports in Oman
