= Butabul Airport =

Butabul Airport Ramlat Bu Tubul
- IATA: none; ICAO: OOBB

Summary
- Airport type: Public
- Serves: Ramlat Bu Tubul, Oman
- Elevation AMSL: 325 ft / 99 m
- Coordinates: 21°10′40″N 55°27′50″E

Map
- Location of the airport in Oman OOBB (Middle East) OOBB (West and Central Asia) OOBB (Asia)

Runways
Direction	Length		Surface
Direction	m	ft	Surface
07/25	1,990	6,529	Sand
- Source: GCM Google Maps

Butabul (ICAO: OOBB ) is an airstrip serving Ramlat Bu Tubul in Oman. The isolated airport is in the desert, 7 kilometres (4 mi) from the border with Saudi Arabia.

The Aradah VOR-DME (Ident: ARD) is located 11.4 nautical miles (21 km) west-northwest of the airport.

== See also ==
- Transport in Oman
- List of airports in Oman
