= Ja'Aluni Airport =

- IATA: JNJ; ICAO: OOJA

Summary
- Airport type: Public
- Serves: Duqm, Oman
- Elevation AMSL: 560 ft / 171 m
- Coordinates: 19°28′50″N 57°18′40″E

Map
- Location of the airport in Oman

Runways
Direction	Length		Surface
Direction	m	ft	Surface
03/21	2,375	7,792	Asphalt
- Sources: FallingRain Bing Maps

Ja'Aluni Airport (IATA: JNJ, ICAO: OOJA) is an airport serving Duqm, an Arabian Sea port in the Al Wusta Governorate of Oman.

The airport is in the desert 44 kilometres (27 mi) southwest of Duqm. The runway length does not include a 300 metres (980 ft) displaced threshold on Runway 21.

== See also ==
- Transport in Oman
- List of airports in Oman
