= Haima Airport =

- IATA: none; ICAO: OOHA

Summary
- Airport type: Public
- Serves: Haima
- Elevation AMSL: 400 ft / 122 m
- Coordinates: 19°58′30″N 56°17′00″E

Map
- Location of the airport in Oman OOHA (Middle East) OOHA (West and Central Asia) OOHA (Asia)

Runways
Direction	Length		Surface
Direction	m	ft	Surface
03/21	2,060	6,759	Dirt
- Source: Google Maps GCM

Haima (ICAO: OOHA) is an airport serving the town of Haima in Oman.

The Haima VOR/DME (Ident: HAI) is located on the field.

== See also ==
- List of airports in Oman
- Transport in Oman
