= Ibri Airport =

- IATA: none; ICAO: OOII

Summary
- Airport type: Public
- Serves: Ibri
- Elevation AMSL: 1,050 ft / 320 m
- Coordinates: 23°11′10″N 56°26′00″E

Map
- Location of the airport in Oman OOII (Middle East) OOII (West and Central Asia) OOII (Asia)

Runways
Direction	Length		Surface
Direction	m	ft	Surface
09/27	2,140	7,021	Dirt
- Source: Google Maps GCM

Ibri Airport (ICAO: OOII) is an airport serving the town of Ibri in Oman. The runway is in the desert 4 kilometres (2 mi) southwest of Ibri.

The Fahud VOR-DME (Ident: FHD) is located 50.3 nautical miles (93 km) south of the airport.

== See also ==
- Transport in Oman
- List of airports in Oman
