= Adam Airport =

- IATA: AOM; ICAO: OOAD

Summary
- Operator: Oman Airports Management Company S.A.O.C.
- Location: Adam, Ad Dakhiliyah Region, Oman
- Elevation AMSL: 1,077 ft / 328 m
- Coordinates: 22°29′35″N 57°22′55″E
- Website: http://www.omanairports.com/

Map
- Location of Airport in Oman AOM (Middle East) AOM (West and Central Asia) AOM (Asia)

Runways
Direction	Length		Surface
Direction	m	ft	Surface
13/31	4,000	13,123	Asphalt
- Source: GCM Google Maps SkyVector

Adam Airport (IATA: AOM, ICAO: OOAD) is an air base and proposed domestic airport situated in the Adam wilayah of the Ad Dakhiliyah Region of Oman. The air base is 18 kilometres (11 mi) northwest of the town of Adam.

Runway length does not include 360 metres (1,180 ft) displaced thresholds on each end. The Izki VOR-DME (Ident: IZK) is located 31.7 nautical miles (59 km) northeast of the airport. A VOR-DME is located on the field.

== See also ==
- Transport in Oman
- List of airports in Oman
