= Ras al Hadd Airport =

- IATA: none; ICAO: OORH

Summary
- Airport type: Public / Military
- Owner: Government of Oman
- Serves: Ras al Hadd, Oman
- Elevation AMSL: 31 ft / 9 m
- Coordinates: 22°15′53″N 59°44′32″E
- Website: http://www.omanairports.com/

Map

Runways
Direction	Length		Surface
Direction	m	ft	Surface
01/19	4,000	13,123	Asphalt
- Source: Google Maps

Ras al Hadd Airport (ICAO: OORH) is an airport in Ash Sharqiyah Region of Oman, about 30 km south of the town of Ras al Hadd. Construction began in 2011, but apart from laying down the runway, nothing else was constructed.

The airport is 7 kilometres (4.3 mi) inland from the Arabian Sea coast. The Sur VOR-DME (Ident: SUR) is located 22.1 nautical miles (41 km) northwest of the airport.

== See also ==
- List of airports in Oman
- Transport in Oman
