= Lekhwair Airport =

- IATA: LKW; ICAO: OOLK

Summary
- Airport type: Public
- Serves: Lekhwair
- Elevation AMSL: 354 ft (108 m)
- Coordinates: 22°48′20″N 55°22′30″E

Map
- Location of the airport in Oman LKW (Middle East) LKW (West and Central Asia) LKW (Asia)

Runways
Direction	Length		Surface
Direction	m	ft	Surface
09/27	1,980	6,496	Dirt
- Source: Google Maps GCM

Lekhwair (IATA: LKW, ICAO: OOLK) is an airport serving the Lekhwair petroleum facility in western Oman.

The Fahud VOR-DME is located 67.5 nautical miles (125 km) east-southeast of the airport.

== See also ==
- List of airports in Oman
- Transport in Oman
