= Saiq Airport =

- IATA: none; ICAO: OOSQ

Summary
- Airport type: Public
- Serves: Saiq, Oman
- Elevation AMSL: 6,500 ft / 1,981 m
- Coordinates: 23°04′30″N 57°38′30″E

Map
- Location of the airport in Oman OOSQ (Middle East) OOSQ (West and Central Asia) OOSQ (Asia)

Runways
Direction	Length		Surface
Direction	m	ft	Surface
13/31	1,100	3,609	Asphalt
- Source: GCM Google Maps SkyVector

Saiq Airport (ICAO: OOSQ ) is an airport serving the city of Saiq in Oman. The airport is on a mesa 3 kilometres (1.9 mi) west of the city.

There is high terrain west through northeast of the airport. Runway length includes 60 metres (200 ft) displaced thresholds on both ends. The Izki VOR-DME (Ident: IZK) is located 12.4 nautical miles (23 km) south-southeast of the airport.

== See also ==
- List of airports in Oman
- Transport in Oman
