= Buraimi Airport =

Buraimi Airport مطار البريمي
- IATA: RMB; ICAO: OOBR

Summary
- Airport type: Public
- Serves: Buraimi, Oman
- Elevation AMSL: 970 ft / 296 m
- Coordinates: 24°14′30″N 55°47′00″E

Map
- Location of the airport in Oman OOBR (Middle East) OOBR (West and Central Asia) OOBR (Asia)

Runways
Direction	Length		Surface
Direction	m	ft	Surface
10/28	890	2,920	Dirt
- Source: GCM Google Maps

Buraimi Airport (Arabic: مطار البريمي, romanized: Maṭār Al-Buraymī; (IATA: RMB, ICAO: OOBR)) is an airport serving the town of Al-Buraimi in Oman.

The airport was formerly known as Buraimi Hamasa Airfield.

Al Ain International Airport (VOR-DME (Ident: ALN) and non-directional beacon (Ident: AIN)) are located 9.8 nautical miles (18 km) west of this airport.

The airport formerly had two runways.

== See also ==
- Transport in Oman
- List of airports in Oman
