= Izki Air Base =

- IATA: none; ICAO: OOIZ

Summary
- Serves: Izki
- Elevation AMSL: 1,700 ft / 518 m
- Coordinates: 22°53′30″N 57°45′30″E

Map
- Location of the airport in Oman

Runways
Direction	Length		Surface
Direction	ft	m	Surface
01/19	5,840	1,780	Asphalt
- Source: Google Maps

Izki Air Base (ICAO: OOIZ ) is an airport serving the town of Izki in Oman.

== See also ==
- Transport in Oman
