= Khasab Airport =

Khasab Airport مطار خصب
- IATA: KHS; ICAO: OOKB

Summary
- Airport type: Public / Military
- Operator: Oman Air
- Serves: Khasab, Oman
- Elevation AMSL: 100 ft (30 m)
- Coordinates: 26°10′15″N 56°14′26″E

Map
- Location of Airport in Oman KHS (Persian Gulf) KHS (Middle East) KHS (Asia)

Runways
Direction	Length		Surface
Direction	m	ft	Surface
01/19	2,500	8,202	Asphalt
- Source: WAD GCM

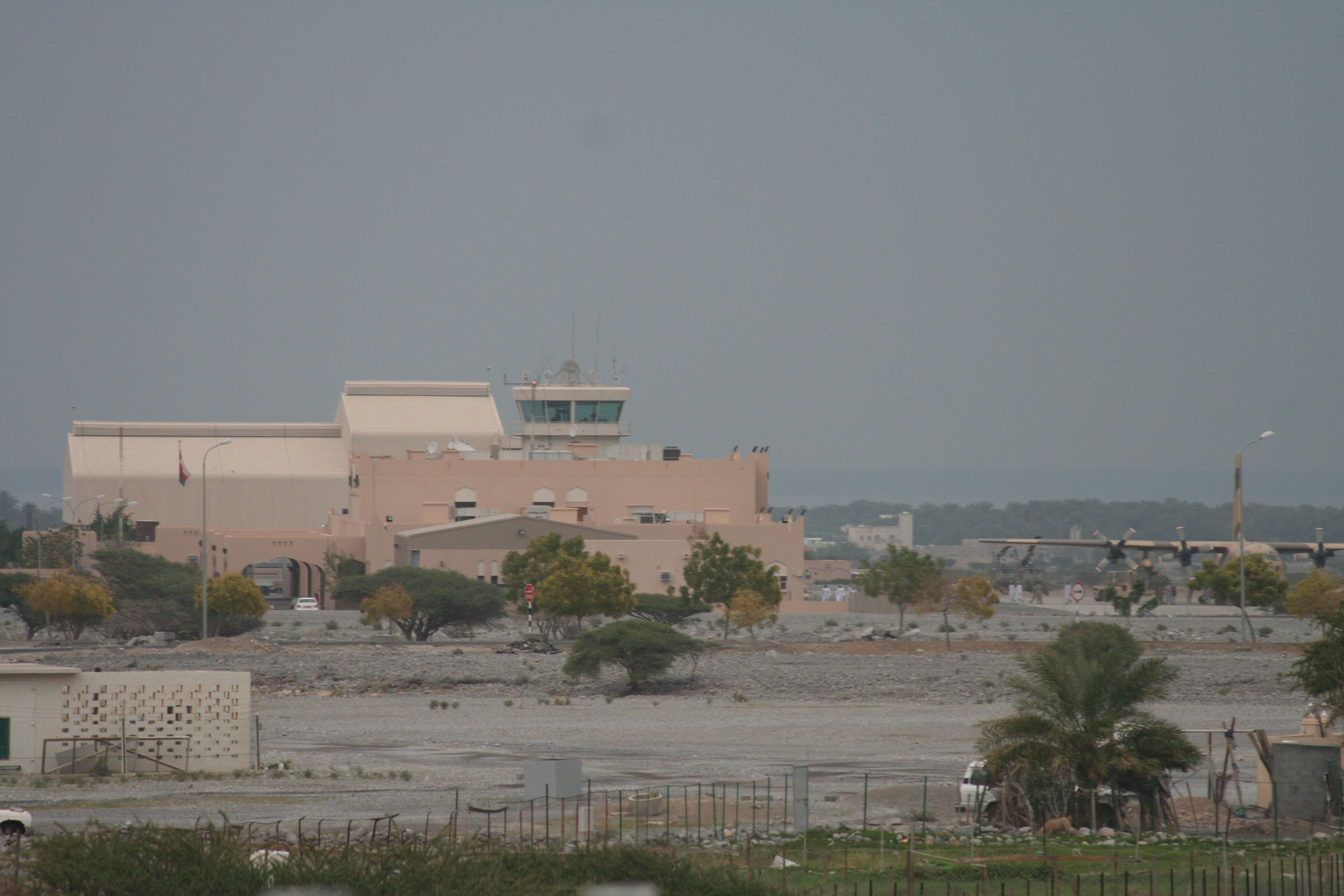
Photo of the control tower at the Khasab Airport

Khasab Airport (Arabic: مطار خصب) (IATA: KHS, ICAO: OOKB) is an airport serving Khasab, a harbor city in Oman and capital of the Musandam Governorate. The harbor opens onto the Strait of Hormuz.

The airport lies in a valley between two close mountain ridges. Another ridge lies just off the departure end of Runway 19, which has a 270 metres (890 ft) displaced threshold.

== Airlines and destinations ==
Airlines	Destinations
Oman Air	Muscat

== Accidents and incidents ==
On 5 December 1991, A De Havilland Canada DHC-6 Twin Otter operated by Oman Aviation had a failed nose gear on landing which resulted in the aircraft veering off the runway.

== See also ==
- Transport in Oman
- List of airports in Oman
