= Duqm Airport =

Airport serving Duqm, Oman

Duqm International Airport
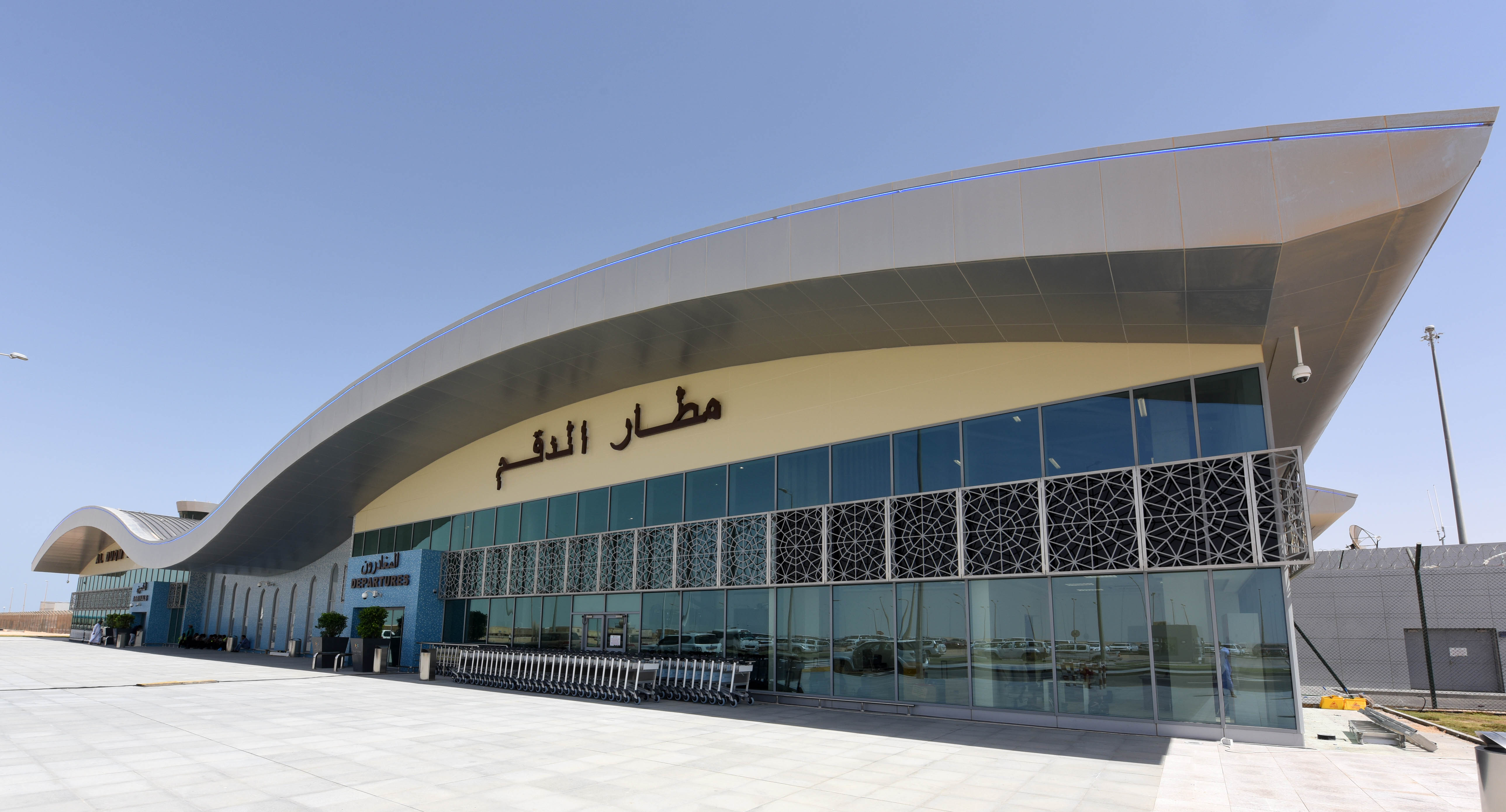
- Main building of Duqm Airport
- IATA: DQM; ICAO: OODQ

Summary
- Airport type: Public
- Operator: Oman Airports Management Company S.A.O.C.
- Serves: Duqm, Oman
- Elevation AMSL: 364 ft / 111 m
- Coordinates: 19°30′00″N 57°38′35″E
- Website: https://www.duqmairport.co.om

Map
- Location of the airport in Oman DQM (Indian Ocean) DQM (Middle East) DQM (West and Central Asia) DQM (Asia)

Runways
Direction	Length		Surface
Direction	m	ft	Surface
04/22	4,000	13,123	Asphalt
- GCM, Google Maps, SkyVector

Duqm Airport (IATA: DQM, ICAO: OODQ) is an airport serving the Arabian Sea port of Duqm in the Al Wusta Region of Oman.

Duqm Airport kicked off its operations on July 23, 2014, to serve passengers between Duqm and Muscat through a temporary building. On September 17, 2018, the passenger terminal, which can accommodate 500,000 passengers annually, started its operations with an area of 8,660 sq. ft. and passenger terminal with two jet bridges.

The airport includes a cargo building with a capacity of 25,000 tonnes annually, with the possibility of expanding it according to future demand. The airport also has a runway of 4 kilometres long and 75 metres with connecting corridors and aircraft parking slots.

The airport is 19 kilometres (12 mi) south of the town. The runway length does not include 120 metres (390 ft) displaced thresholds on each end. There is a VOR on the field.

== Airlines and destinations ==
Airlines	Destinations
SalamAir	Masirah, Muscat

== See also ==
- Transport in Oman
- List of airports in Oman
