= ZarrinShahr Airport =

Airport in Iran

- IATA: none; ICAO: none

Summary
- Airport type: Light
- Owner: Mohamad Ramezni Pour
- Operator: Ministry of Defence and Armed Forces Logistics (Iran)
- Location: Isfahan, Iran
- Coordinates: 32°19′38″N 51°22′38″E

Map
- ZarrinShahr Airport

Runways
Direction	Length		Surface
Direction	ft	m	Surface
29R/11L	5,650	1,722	Asphalt

Zarrinshahr Airport is located in the Zarrin shahr area of Isfahan, one of the functions of Lenjan city.
