= Rustaq Airport =

Airport in Oman

Mussanah Airport Mussanah Airport
- IATA: MNH; ICAO: OORQ

Summary
- Airport type: Public / Military
- Owner: Oman Government
- Serves: Al Masna'ah, Oman
- Elevation AMSL: 349 ft / 106 m
- Coordinates: 23°38′20″N 57°29′20″E

Map
- Location of the airport in Oman OORQ (Indian Ocean) OORQ (Middle East) OORQ (West and Central Asia) OORQ (Asia)

Runways
Direction	Length		Surface
Direction	m	ft	Surface
08/26	4,000	13,123	Asphalt
- Source: Google Maps SkyVector GCM

Rustaq Airport (IATA: MNH, ICAO: OORQ) is an airport serving the city of Rustaq in Oman. Also known as a staging post for RAF planes into Afghanistan and also other military Strategic points. Rustaq is a port city on the Gulf of Oman, and the airport is 20 kilometres (12 mi) inland from the coast.

Runway length does not include 400 metres (1,300 ft) displaced thresholds on both ends. The Seeb VOR-DME (Ident: MCT) is located 42.3 nautical miles (78 km) east of the airport.

== See also ==
- List of airports in Oman
- Transport in Oman
