= Tal Afar Air Base =

Air force base

Tal Afar Air Base FOB Sykes
- Part of Iraqi Air Force (former), U.S. Forces (post-2003)
- Near Tal Afar, Nineveh Governorate, Iraq in Iraq
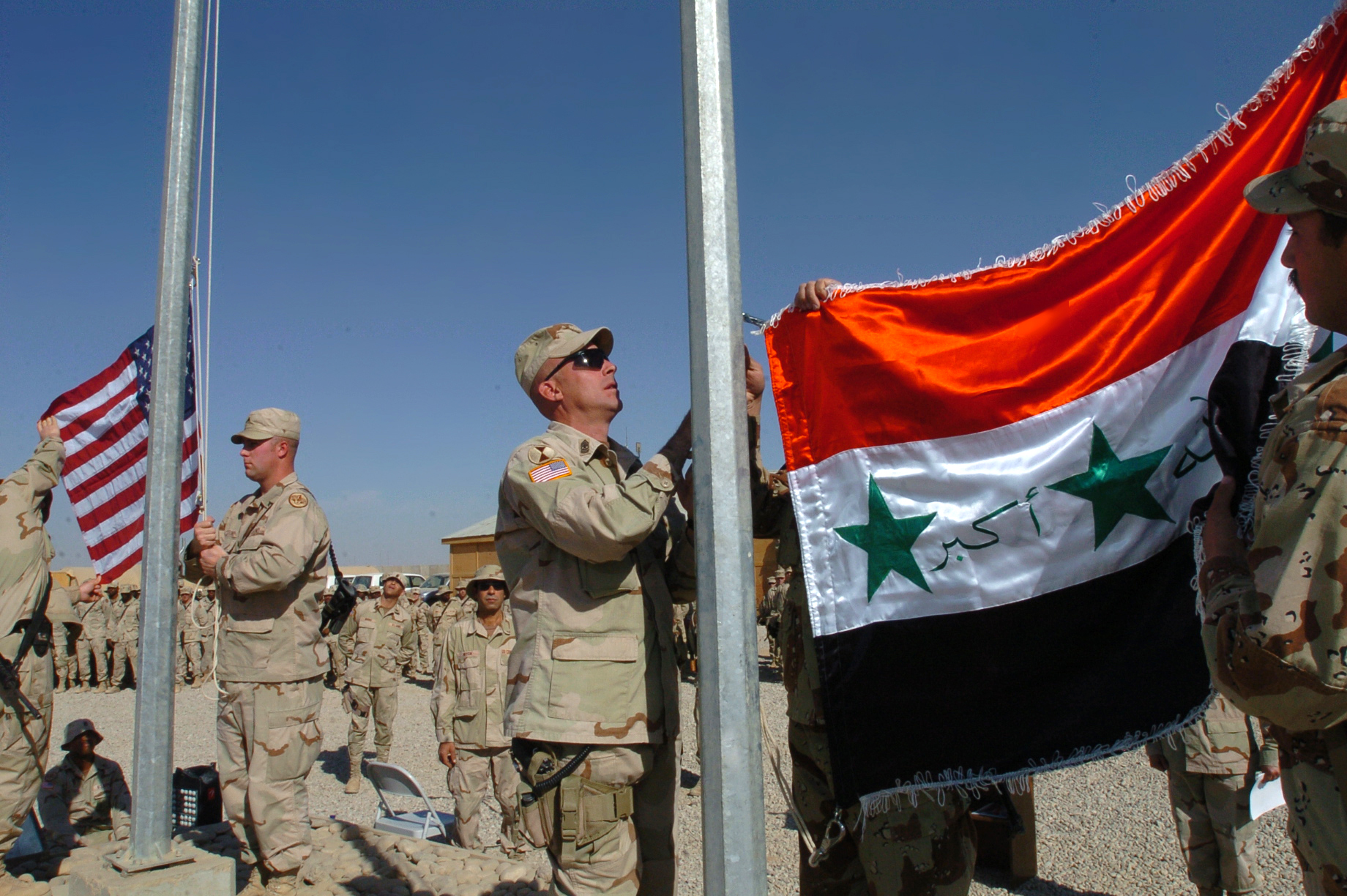
- U.S. Army and Iraqi Army Soldiers observe the Veterans Day holiday at FOB Sykes in Tal Afar, Iraq, 2005.

Site information
- Type: Air Base
- Condition: Severely damaged

Location
- Location in Iraq
- Coordinates: 36°17′04″N 042°24′17″E

Site history
- Built: 1982–1984
- Built for: Iraqi Air Force
- Built by: SIX-CFE (Belgium)
- In use: 1983 — 2003 (Iraqi Air Force); 2003 — 2011 (U.S. Armed Forces); 2011 — 2014 (Iraqi Ground Forces); 2014 — 2016 (ISIS); 2016 — present (Iraqi Ground Forces)
- Materials: Concrete
- Battles/wars: Iran–Iraq War; 2003 invasion of Iraq; Battle of Tal Afar (2005)

Airfield information
- Identifiers: ICAO: ORTF
- Elevation: 300 metres (984 ft) AMSL
Runways
Direction	Length and surface
13/31	3,300 metres (10,827 ft) Concrete
- Dispersal facilities: 8 High-speed approaches and 12 hardstands with concrete shelters

Tal Afar Air Base (ICAO: ORTF) is a former Iraqi Air Force base near Tal Afar in the Nineveh Governorate of Iraq. It was constructed in 1983 for use by the Iraqi Air Force and operated until the 2003 invasion of Iraq. After seizure by Coalition ground forces, the base was converted into Forward Operating Base Sykes and operated until American withdrawal in 2011.

== History ==
In 1983, Tal Afar Air Base was constructed to improve the deployment flexibility of the Iraqi Air Force (IQAF). It was also as part of a national drive to construct new airfields and renovate existing airfields. One 3,000 meter long runway orientated NW/SE was constructed. Additional installation of facilities included 4 high-speed approaches on either ends of the runway, which totalled up to 8, two taxiways, two cross-over links, and an apron. There were two dispersal facilities that totalled up to 10 hardstands/aircraft bunkers, with one at the end of each high-speed approaches, and the other two adjoined to the cross-over link. It was in the early to mid-stages of construction by June 1983. Following completion, it was a primary air base for the IQAF. It was constructed by the Belgian company SIX-CFE in 1982–1984 on the orders of Saddam. At each end of the main 10,000-ft longrunway are a dozen hardened aircraft shelters known as "Yugos" which were built by Yugoslav contractors.

=== 2003–present ===
The base was heavily attacked by Coalition airpower during Operation Iraqi Freedom in March 2003, and seized by Coalition ground forces. Bruce Willis led his band to play for soldiers of the 187th Infantry Regiment, 3rd Brigade, 101st Airborne Division at the airfield on September 25, 2003. After its capture, the base was operated by American forces until the withdrawal from Iraq in 2011 when it was handed over to Iraqi forces.

In early June 2014, Tal Afar Air Base was subjected to severe attacks by ISIS militants, and battles took place there that continued until June 23, when Iraqi forces were forced to withdraw and leave the base in the hands of ISIS. Following its capture, ISIS used the base mainly as a training camp for its fighters but also as a detention center for Yezidi prisoners captured from nearby Sinjar. The base was being used as a training camp for the Islamic State's Knights of War Battalion. It continued to serve as an ISIS training camp for its fighters until Iraqi forces supported by the PMF recaptured the air base in November 2016.
