= Salalah International Airport =

Airport in Oman

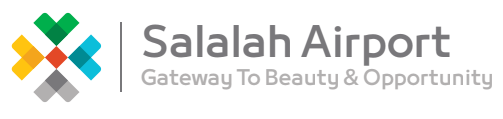

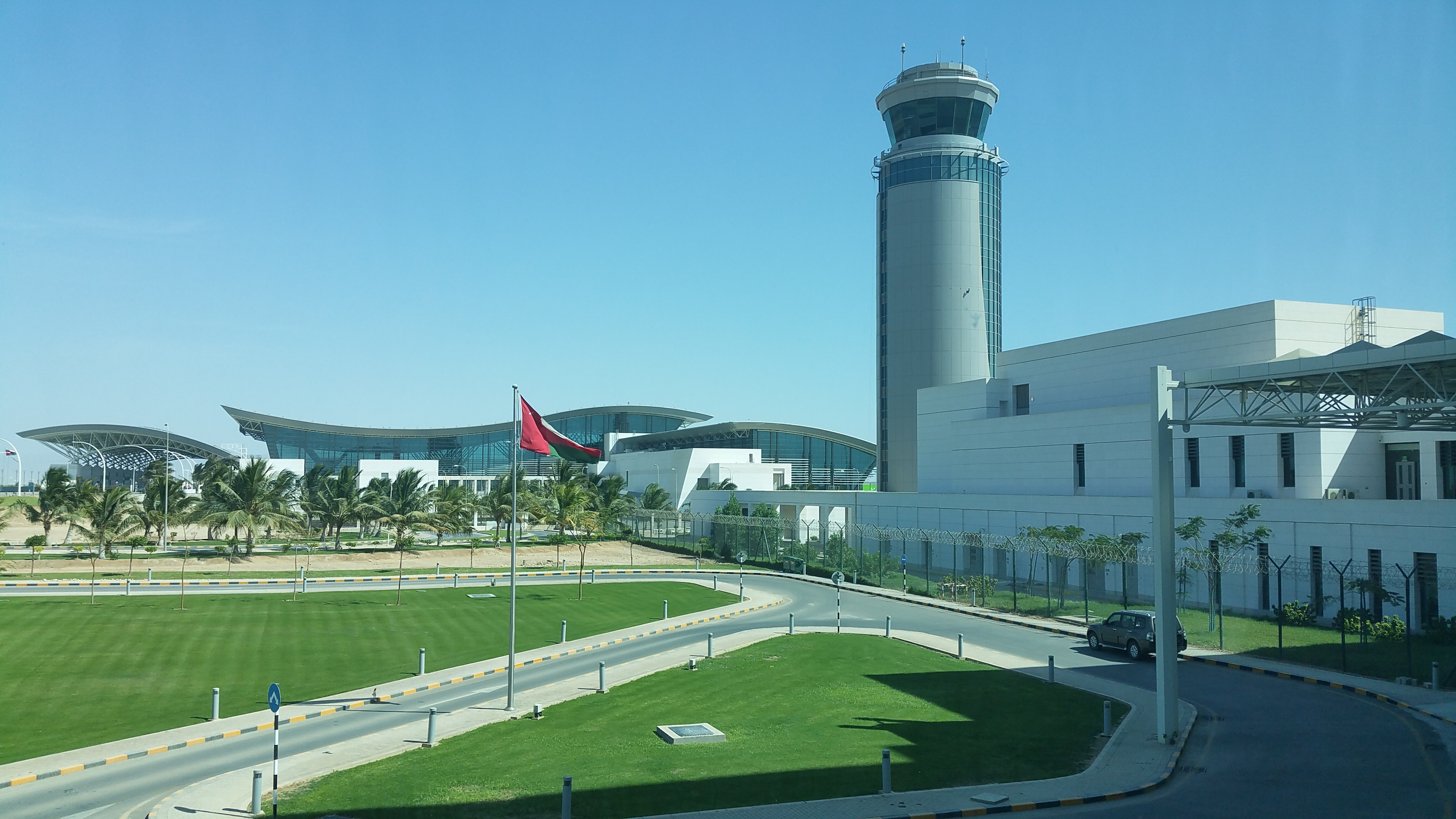
- IATA: SLL; ICAO: OOSA

Summary
- Airport type: Public
- Owner: Government
- Operator: OAMC
- Serves: Salalah, Oman
- Location: Ar Rubat Street (13.9 km from Salalah City)
- Opened: 1935
- Focus city for: Oman Air; Salam Air
- Elevation AMSL: 73 ft (22 m)
- Coordinates: 17°02′20″N 54°05′32″E
- Website: salalahairport.co.om

Map
- Location of airport in Oman

Runways
Direction	Length		Surface
Direction	m	ft	Surface
07/25	4,000	13,123	Asphalt
- Source: GCM Google Maps

Salalah International Airport (IATA: SLL, ICAO: OOSA) is the Sultanate of Oman's secondary international airport after Muscat International Airport. This former military airfield is located on the Salalah coastal plain in the Dhofar Governorate, 5.5 kilometres (3.4 mi) northeast of Salalah's city centre. The airport features flights to regional destinations as well as a few intercontinental charter services from Europe.

== History ==
=== Early years ===
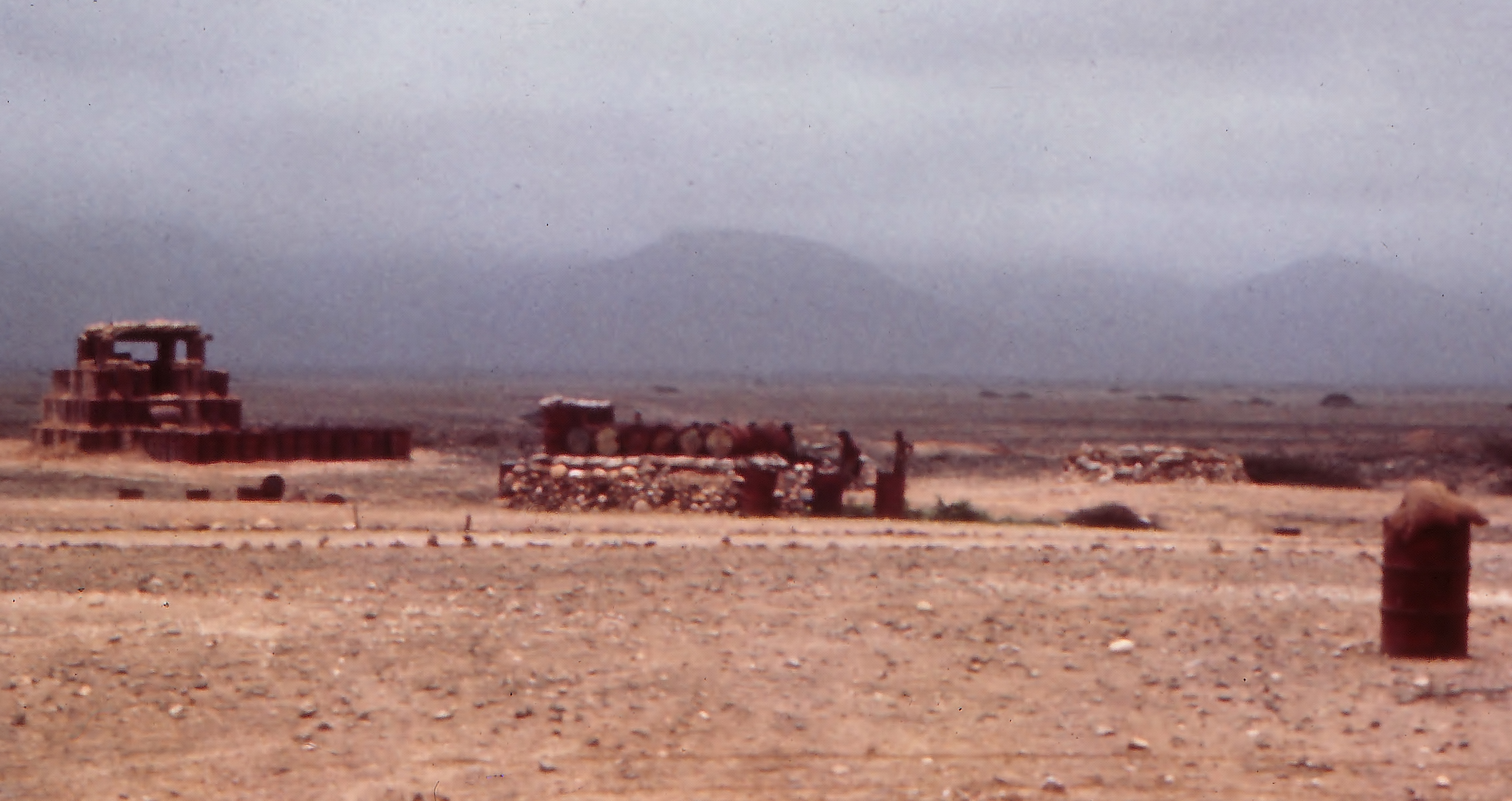
Airfield defences at RAF Salalah in 1972 during the Dhofar War

An airfield was established at Salalah in 1935 by the British Royal Air Force for operations in support of the Sultan of Oman. Aircraft based there operated during the Jebel Akhdar War between 1954 and 1957, and the Dhofar War between 1962 and 1976. The British presence at RAF Salalah ended in 1977.

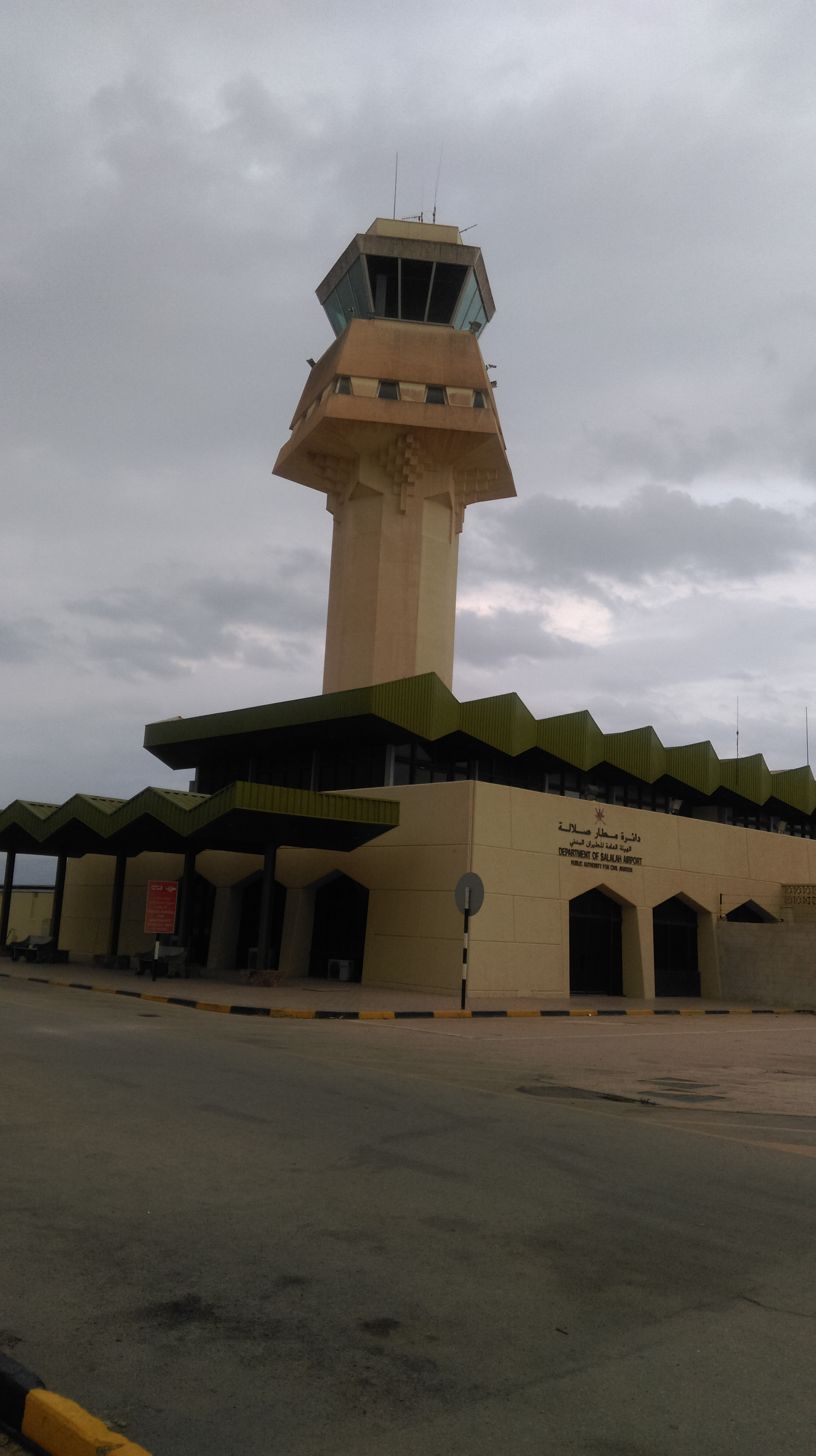
The original civilian buildings at Salalah Airport

Salalah Airport opened as a civilian facility in 1977. Initially, it only handled domestic flights from Muscat and a few chartered flights to UAE or Qatar. Oman Air Services (OAS) began services to Salalah in 1982 and the inaugural flight of Oman Air arrived from Muscat in April 1993. Co-located with the civilian airport is a military airbase of the Royal Air Force of Oman called RAFO Salalah.

In 2003, Salalah Airport got the status of an international airport. Oman Air began scheduled services to Dubai from Salalah in 2003, leading to increased passenger traffic while other Gulf carriers operated flights only during the Khareef season. The following year, Air India commenced operations to Kozhikode and then to Cochin, making it the first airline to operate non-seasonal international flights to Salalah. Since 2003, the airport has experienced increase in passenger traffic and civilian aircraft traffic. The area is a popular tourist destination for both Omani citizens and foreigners, especially from July to September when the Asian monsoon touches the region, commencing the start of the Khareef season, making it an unusually attractive location within the normally arid Gulf region. Currently, Salalah is considered the second most important airport in the country.

=== Development since the 2000s ===
In 2011, planning and construction began for the new state-of-the-art Salalah Airport. The move was made by the Ministry of Transport and Communication to further boost the city's tourism sector as well as to cater to the growing number of passengers flying to-and-from the city. Deals were signed with more than 20 different construction companies to complete the International Airport in deals worth $854 million. COWI A/S-Larsen Joint Venture had been the main consultant on the project, which was later taken over by Hill International LLC.

The Salalah Airport is planned to cater to one million passengers in the first phase. Also the construction of a second, 4-km runway is scheduled for the new airport. The airport's current runway will also be expanded to cater to the largest of aircraft, as well as the construction of a new parallel taxiway to the north. The international airport will also feature a 65,000 sqm passenger terminal building with car parking for up to 3,000 vehicles and a 57-meter high ATC Tower.

Design of the airport takes into account future development projects and allows expansion to cater for up to six million passengers per year, if required.

The new Salalah airport commenced operations in June 2015, with an Oman Air flight from Muscat becoming the first airline to arrive at the new airport. However, the new airport was officially opened in November 2015. The old airport situated to the south of the new one has since been transformed into a domestic and emergency airport.

== Facilities ==
A new Duty Free service has been started by a private company in association with the OAMC. Many food counters have been providing services since its opening. Oman Air placed a new lounge opposite to the airside and gates in the new terminal for Business Class, First Class, and Economy Class passengers who are Gold and Silver Sinbad Service Card holders. The new airport has four aerobridges with an air conditioning facility.

== Airlines and destinations ==
Airlines	Destinations
Air Arabia	Abu Dhabi, Sharjah
Air Astana	Almaty, Astana
Air India Express	Kochi,Kozhikode
Belavia	Seasonal charter: Minsk
Edelweiss Air	Seasonal: Zurich
Etihad Airways	Seasonal: Abu Dhabi
Flydubai	Dubai–International
Flynas	Seasonal: Riyadh
Jazeera Airways	Seasonal: Kuwait City
Kuwait Airways	Seasonal: Kuwait City
Oman Air	Kozhikode , Seasonal charter: Moscow-Sheremetyevo, Muscat, Yekaterinburg
Qatar Airways	Doha
Saudia	Seasonal: Riyadh
SalamAir	Kozhikode, Muscat; Seasonal: Dammam, Prague
Smartwings	Seasonal charter: Bratislava

== Statistics ==
Year	Total passengers	Total freight including mail in tons	Total civil aircraft movements
2025	1,702,121 ▲		11,113
2020	386,107 ▼	743 ▼	3,384
2019	1,365,854 ▼	1,395 ▲	11,886
2018	1,386,994 ▼	979 ▼	15,518
2017	1,485,635 ▲	1,327 ▼	17,511
2016	1,198,846 ▲	1,563 ▲	10,703
2015	1,027,578 ▲	1,350 ▼	10,293
2014	841,970 ▲	1,799 ▲	8,571
2013	746,994 ▲	1,417 ▲	7,944
2012	629,305 ▲	1,335 ▼	6,175
2011	513,278 ▲	1,366 ▲	5,520
2010	455,297 ▲	1,283 ▼	5,085
2009	426,503 ▲	1,284 ▲	5,045
2008	407,788 ▲	1,129 ▲	4,248
2007	337,679 ▲	1,110 ▼	4,079
2006	288,700 ▲	1,441 ▲	4,215

== See also ==
- List of airports in Oman
- List of the busiest airports in the Middle East
- Transport in Oman
