= Mina al Fahal =

Mila al Fahal ميناء الفحل
- Location in Oman
- Coordinates: 23°38′N 58°32′E
- Country: Oman
- Governorate: Muscat Governorate
- Time zone: UTC+4 (Oman Standard Time)

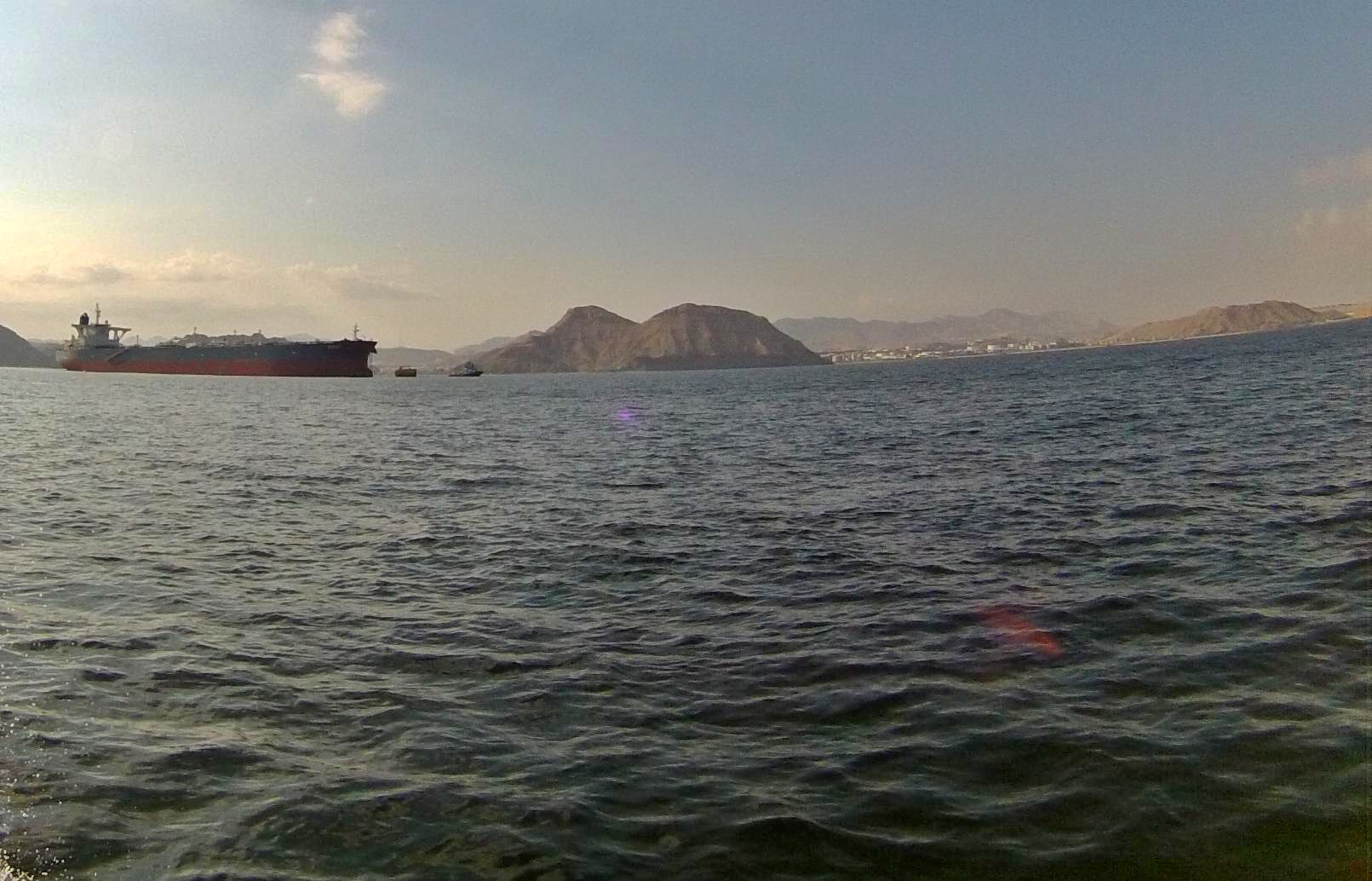
Mina Al Fahal from sea

Mina' al Fahal (Arabic: ميناء الفحل, also known as Miana al Fahl, also in the past Saih al Malieh, and Saih al-Malih (Arabic: سيح المالح)) is a coastal area in the northeast of Oman, near to the country's capital, Muscat. It was renamed from Saih al Maleh as the petroleum processing plant was developed. It is a key area for the country's petroleum operations. Petroleum Development Oman (PDO) is based at Mina al Fahal, and the Oman Refinery Company (ORC) has a 104,000 b/d oil refinery located here. Crude oil and refinery products are loaded onto tankers off Mina Al Fahal by subsea pipeline and SBM (Single Buoy Mooring) Systems. Two of the SBMs are owned by PDO for crude export and the third is owned by SOM (Shell Oman Marketing).
