= Manston Air Base =

Military airbase in Oman

- IATA: none; ICAO: none

Summary
- Airport type: Military
- Elevation AMSL: 3,182 ft / 970 m
- Coordinates: 16°59′30″N 53°21′30″E

Map
- Location of the airport in Oman

Runways
Direction	Length		Surface
Direction	ft	m	Surface
16/34	4,935	1,505	Asphalt
- Source: Google Maps

Manston Air Base is a military airbase in Oman, constructed by the British military during the Dhofar Rebellion.

== See also ==
- Transport in Oman
