= Ghaziabad, Kunar =

Ghāzīābād غازی آباد
- Village
- Interactive map of Ghāzīābād
- Coordinates: 34°42′57″N 70°45′51″E
- Country: Afghanistan
- Province: Kunar Province

Government
  - Amir Muhammad Ghazi khan Shaheed: Amir Muhammad Ghazi khan Shaheed
- Time zone: + 4.30

Ghāzīābād (Pashto: غازی آباد) is a District in Kunar Province, in eastern Afghanistan. Named after the khan of Ghaziabad, Amir Muhammad Ghazi Khan Shaheed.
