= RAFO Masirah =

- IATA: MSH; ICAO: OOMA

Summary
- Airport type: Military
- Operator: Gen. Hussain Al Zadjali
- Location: Masirah, Oman
- Elevation AMSL: 68 ft (21 m)
- Coordinates: 20°40′31″N 058°53′25″E

Map
- Location of airport in Oman

Runways
Direction	Length		Surface
Direction	m	ft	Surface
07/25	2,574	8,446	Asphalt
17/35	3,050	10,005	Asphalt

RAFO Masirah (IATA: MSH, ICAO: OOMA) is a military airport located on the island of Masirah in Oman.

== Facilities ==
The airport resides at an elevation of 64 feet (20 m) above mean sea level. It has two asphalt paved runways: 07/25 measuring 2,574 by 45 metres (8,445 ft × 148 ft) and 17/35 measuring 3,050 by 45 metres (10,007 ft × 148 ft).

In the 1950s, it also included a 2 ft 0in Gauge railway.

== Airlines and destinations ==
Airlines	Destinations
SalamAir	Duqm, Muscat

== Accidents and Incidents ==
On April 1, 2018, a BAE Hawk Mk 166 crashed on landing, killing the student pilot and one person in the ground, only the flight instructor survived with serious injuries.
