= Petroleum Development Oman =

Omani state-owned oil and gas company

شركة تنمية نفط عمان Petroleum Development Oman
- Company type: Government-owned corporation
- Industry: Oil and gas
- Founded: 1937 (as Petroleum Development of Oman and Dhofar ) 1967 (as Petroleum Development Oman )
- Headquarters: Muscat, Oman
- Revenue: $11.4 billion (2007)
- Owner: Oman Government 60% Shell 34% TotalEnergies 4% Partex 2%
- Number of employees: 9,000+
- Website: Official website

Petroleum Development Oman (PDO) is the leading exploration and production company in the Sultanate of Oman. The Company delivers the majority of the country's crude oil production and natural gas supply. The company is owned by the Government of Oman (with a 60% interest), Shell (34%), TotalEnergies (4%) and Partex (2%). The first economic oil find was made in 1962, and the first oil consignment was exported in 1967.

== History ==
A geological survey of the country in 1925 by the D'Arcy Exploration Company found no conclusive evidence of oil. Twelve years later, when American geologists began intensively searching for oil in neighboring Saudi Arabia, Sultan Said bin Taimur granted a 75-year concession for central Oman to the Iraq Petroleum Company (IPC), and a separate concession for the province of Dhofar. Pausing only for World War II, exploration for oil was under way in Oman.

IPC formed an associate company, Petroleum Development (Oman and Dhofar) Limited, to operate the concession. The company had the same five shareholders as IPC, four of which had an interest of 23.75%: the Shell, the Anglo-Iranian Oil Company (which would eventually become BP), Compagnie Française des Pétroles (a predecessor of today's Total) and the Near East Development Company (whose shareholders were Standard Oil of New Jersey and Socony-Vacuum, (today's ExxonMobil), and the remaining 5% stake being held by the fifth shareholder, Partex, representing the interests of the oil magnate, Calouste Gulbenkian.

In 1951, the Dhofar concession was allowed to expire and the company dropped 'Dhofar' from its title, becoming Petroleum Development (Oman) Limited.

Having landed at Duqm in February 1954, IPC geologists were faced with tribal conflicts which made access to the most promising oil prospect, Jebel Fahud, difficult. They reached the jebel in October 1954 and began to survey the surrounding terrain. Supplies had to be transported from Duqm. In January 1956 the company started drilling its first well at Fahud but did not find any oil. Later, when the supply line was switched to the Sumail Gap, warring tribes were able to disrupt convoys and bring operations to a halt.

Further dry wells were drilled and this lack of success, combined with worsening logistical problems and a glut of oil on the world market, led most of the partners to withdraw from the venture in 1960. Only Shell and Partex opted to remain in Oman to continue the search for oil. The first successful findings, on an commercially relevant level, were made at Yibal in April 1962.

In 1963 the Natih field was discovered, followed closely by success at Fahud, only a few hundred metres from the original IPC well. Investment in a pipeline to the coast and all the other hardware necessary to transport and export Oman's crude was made. A 276-kilometre pipeline requiring 60,000 tons of steel pipe was laid, the labour being provided by the inhabitants of whichever villages happened to be near the worksite.

The pipe laying was followed closely by the construction of an industrial complex at Saih al Maleh (later renamed Mina al Fahal), the building of a tank farm, the installation of single-buoy moorings for seagoing tankers and the erection of a 20-megawatt power plant. The whole development — including the pipeline, the coastal industrial area, the tank farm, the marine terminal, a chain of radio repeater stations and housing for staff at Ras al Hamra — cost $70 million.

The first export of Omani oil took place on 27 July 1967. The original debit note shows that the consignment consisted of 543,800 barrels (86,460 m^{3}) of oil valued at $1.42 a barrel. A month before, in June, the Compagnie Française des Pétroles rejoined the partnership by taking over two-thirds of Partex's equity share, resulting in the following shareholding in the company that by then had changed its name to Petroleum Development (Oman): Shell 85%, Compagnie Francaise des Petroles 10% and Partex 5%.

In 1969, the Dhofar concession was reacquired and was once again integrated into the companies operations.

On 23 July 1970 Qaboos bin Said took over from his father as ruler of the country. He made his first visit to the PD(O) offices on 18 August 1970.

=== Consolidation ===
All through the 1970s, PD(O) strove to maintain its production and replace its reserves while developing its professionalism. Some significant discoveries early in the decade contributed to that objective: Ghaba North in 1972, followed by Saih Nihayda, Saih Rawl, Qarn Alam and Habur. All five fields were on stream by 1975, the crude oil being transported via a new 20-inch (510 mm) pipeline to the main pipeline 75 kilometers east of Fahud. Thanks in part to these new sources of oil, production averaged 281,778 barrels per day (44,799.1 m^{3}/d) (bpd) in 1972 and 341,000 barrels per day (54,200 m^{3}/d) in 1976/76.

The first half of the 1970s was important for other reasons as well. On 1 January 1974 the Government of Oman acquired a 25% shareholding in the Petroleum Development (Oman); six months later the shareholding was increased to 60%, backdated to the beginning of the year. As a result, the foreign interest in PD(O) was now made up of the Shell (34%), Compagnie Française des Petroles (4%) and Partex (2%). These shareholdings have remained unchanged to the present day. The company, however, underwent a change six years later. On 15 May 1980, it was registered by Royal Decree as a limited liability company under the name Petroleum Development Oman — now without parentheses in its name. Its current nautilus logo was also introduced then.

=== Maturity (1994–2002) ===
By the end of 2000 PDO witnessed an increase in production. This was due to the increase in production arose from the application of the latest technology to increase oil recovery in existing fields. And some of the production increase over the years was made up of "new oil" from fields that were not only found but also developed at an ever-accelerating pace. During the period 1967–1980 all of PDO's production came from 11 fields; by 1988, 50 fields provided the sum total of PDO's oil output; by 1990 it was 60, and in 1999 it was nearly 100.

When PDO's gas-exploration campaign in the early 1990s made it clear how bountiful the country's gas fields were, the Government decided to establish a completely new industry: the export of liquefied natural gas (LNG). In 1996 PDO concluded an agreement with the Government to develop the central Oman gas fields in order to supply gas to an LNG plant in Qalhat, near Sur. To fulfill its end of the agreement, the company had to drill wells, hook them up to a new gas processing plant at Saih Rawl, and then transport the processed gas via a 352-kilometre pipeline to Qalhat. Furthermore, PDO would then be responsible for guaranteeing the delivery of gas for 25 years.

This upstream LNG project, costing $1.2 billion, is the single biggest project in PDO's history. And it was executed as planned. The Saih Rawl Central Processing Plant and the gas pipeline from Saih Rawl to Qalhat were dedicated to the nation in November 1999, the first downstream cargo of LNG was shipped to Korea in April 2000, and Haitham bin Tariq officially opened the LNG plant six months later.

Having built up such momentum in its oil production as it entered the 1990s, the Company fully expected the trend to continue. Unfortunately, the company's field-development strategy for the start of the 21st century – based on incremental infill drilling with horizontal wells and extensive waterflooding – had its momentum dissipated before the waterflooding projects, which require comprehensive reservoir studies, could be fully implemented. The natural production-rate decline of its major oil fields eventually caught up with the Company at the start of the millennium. In 1997, the 35-year old Yibal field began to decline in production. Two scientific papers published in 2003 showed a decline of about 12 percent annually since 1997, with 5 percent being the regional average.

=== Sustainability (2002–present) ===
Following a comprehensive review in 2002 that led to a sweeping change programme, PDO laid out production-recovery plans based not only on waterflooding but also on enhanced oil recovery (EOR) techniques: the application of heat, chemicals or gas solvents to alter the way oil or injected water flows in a reservoir. In order for them to be sustainable in the long run, the plans had to be executed for substantially less money than originally envisaged, making them all the more challenging. A total of $2 billion in cost savings over the five-year period 2002–2008 were incorporated into the company's budget. Because of the long-term nature of investments that would be required, the Omani Government agreed at the end of 2004 to extend PDO's exploration and production concession and operating agreements for 40 years – until 2044.

Meanwhile, gas continues to be a growth area for the company. A new gas-processing plant was commissioned in Saih Nihayda in 2005, and another one is due in 2008 for PDO's newest gas field in Kauther. With the addition of those two processing plants, nearly one-third of the hydrocarbon energy that PDO supplies will come from natural gas—the fuel that has a central role in the Government's economic diversification plans.

Faced with oil prices above $100 a barrel and sinking field capacities, PDO was one of the many companies to introduce in-site combustion, an EOR technique involving lighting fires within the reservoirs, in 2008.

In 2010, the company announced the discovery of three new oil- and one gas field.

Since 2010, PDO has been working on the Miraah Solar Project, a 1,021 megawatt solar thermal facility, which is to be used in EOR from 2017/2018 onwards.

In 2011, a series of strikes and protests took place in Oman that also involved hundreds of PDO workers demanding higher wages.

Since the decline of natural production capacity, PDO has invested heavily to keep up and try to increase production again. Having to rely on marginal wells and enhanced oil recovery techniques more and more, the overall quality of oil is getting heavier and drifting down said the director of energy consulting firm Purvin & Gertz in 2011.

In 2013, a team of members from Manpower Ministry and Oman's Trade Union Federation found nearly 50 labor law violations and mistakes in safety norms during an inspection at PDO's Fahud facilities.

In 2014, P. Mohamed Ali, the former managing director of Galfar Engineering and Contracting, was sentenced to three years in jail for bribes made to PDO. In the same year Juma Al Hinai, the former head of the tender committee at PDO, was also charged with bribery and sentenced to three years in jail, including a fine of 600,000 rials. He was banned from public office for 20 years. Subsequently, the head of PDO warned all contractors to adhere to anti-bribery and -corruption policies.

In 2016, PDO launched a $3.4 billion loan program with HSBC bank. In the same year, PDO signed a contract with GE Oil & Gas to provide Progressive cavity pump (PCP) equipment and related services from late 2016 onwards.

In 2017, following many years of reconstruction and oilfield optimization, PDO confirmed a new combined oil, gas and condensate production record (1.293 million barrels of oil equivalent per day, BOE) for 2016. The company is still faced with a low price environment and continues to work on cost controlling measures. The company in 2017 also celebrated 50 years of oil exports and announced a continually growing expansion into hydrocarbon and renewable energy generation and water management – turning PDO into a fully diversified energy company. Around 80% of operations are estimated to remain in the oil and gas sector until 2027.

The largest onshore discovery in 2018 was a natural-gas condensate area, found on the Mabrouk North East field, operated by PDO.

== Corporate structure ==
=== Board of directors ===
The Board consists of twelve members and includes the chairman, who is the Minister of Energy & Minerals His Excellency Dr. Salim bin Nasser bin Said Al Aufi]], who represents the Government of Oman and representation from PDO's private shareholders, Royal Dutch Shell, Total and Partex.

=== Managing Director's Committee ===
The Managing Director's Committee (MDC) shares responsibility for the company's overall performance and business direction. The committee is headed by the managing director who is assisted by fifteen other Directors, who are responsible for setting the technical standards, the allocation of staff and their development.

== Operations ==
PDO operates in a concession area of about 90,000 km2 (one third of Oman's geographical area), has around 130 producing oil fields, 14 producing gas fields, around 8,000 active wells, a diverse workforce of more than 8,500 employees of 64 nationalities, and more than 45,000 contractors.

The primary objective of PDO is to engage efficiently, responsibly and safely in the exploration, production, development, storage and transportation of hydrocarbons in the Sultanate.

=== Oil exploration and production ===
PDO finds oil fields and develops them into productive assets by drilling wells and constructing and operating various hydrocarbon treatment and transport facilities. The crude oil that is produced from the fields is not sold by the company but rather delivered to a storage facility at Mina al Fahal, where it is loaded onto seagoing tankers at the discretion of the company's shareholders. As such, the Company does not earn any money from the sale of oil; its shareholders do. The shareholders in turn cover all budgeted operating and capital expenditure.

=== Gas exploration and production ===
PDO also finds, develops and operates natural gas fields and their associated production systems all on behalf of the Government of Oman. The Company delivers gas to the Government Gas System, which supplies fuel for most of Oman's power stations and some of its industries, and to the Oman LNG plant at Qalhat, near Sur. As part of its gas production operations, PDO also supplies some 50,000 barrels per day (7,900 m^{3}/d) of condensate liquid hydrocarbons that condense out of natural gas and about 200 tonnes per day of liquefied petroleum gas, which is mainly used for cooking.

=== Solar ===
Since 2010, PDO has been working together with partnering GlassPoint to create the Miraah Solar Project, a 1,021 megawatt solar thermal facility which has been under construction in Southern Oman since 2015. The facility produces steam, which will be used for thermal enhanced oil recovery (EOR), extracting heavy oils from the Amal oilfield. The plant is one of the largest solar plants in the world and will generate around 6,000 tons of solar steam every day, and by replacing the current EOR system which relies on the burning of natural gas, it will reduce CO_{2} emissions by over 300,000 tons annually.

=== Education and training ===
In addition, PDO plays a key role in educating and developing young Omani talent through its comprehensive education and training programmes. It also supports and encourages local businesses and communities through its Business Development Centre. PDO believes that the sustainable development of the country is furthered through its education and training initiatives and through its efforts to stimulate successful Omani businesses throughout the country. The PDO established the Oman Oil and Gas Exhibition Centre in Muscat in 1995 to educate those in fossil fuel development in the country.

== Awards ==
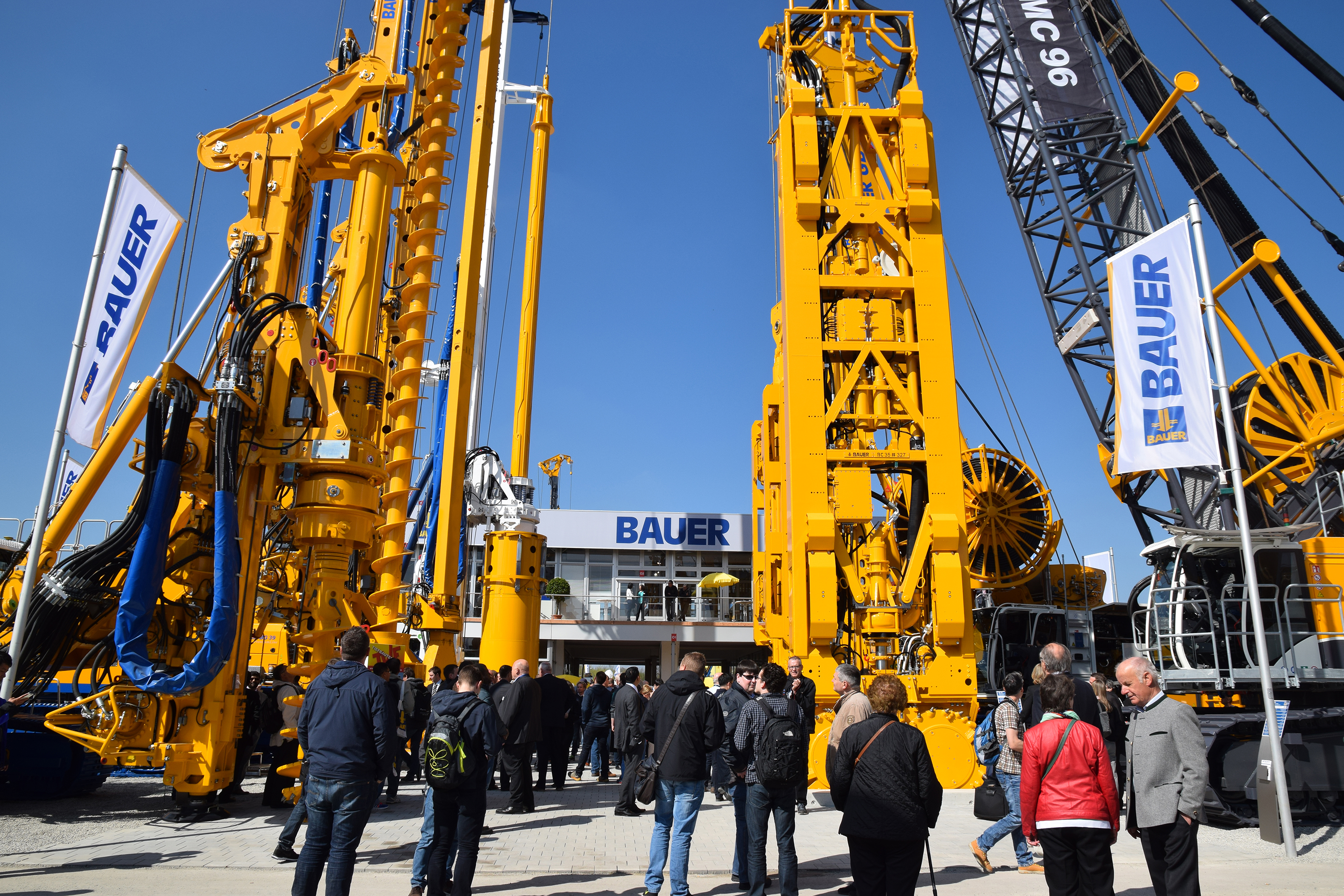
The BAUER Maschinen Group on the world's most important specialist trade fair for construction equipment, the bauma (trade fair) in Munich.

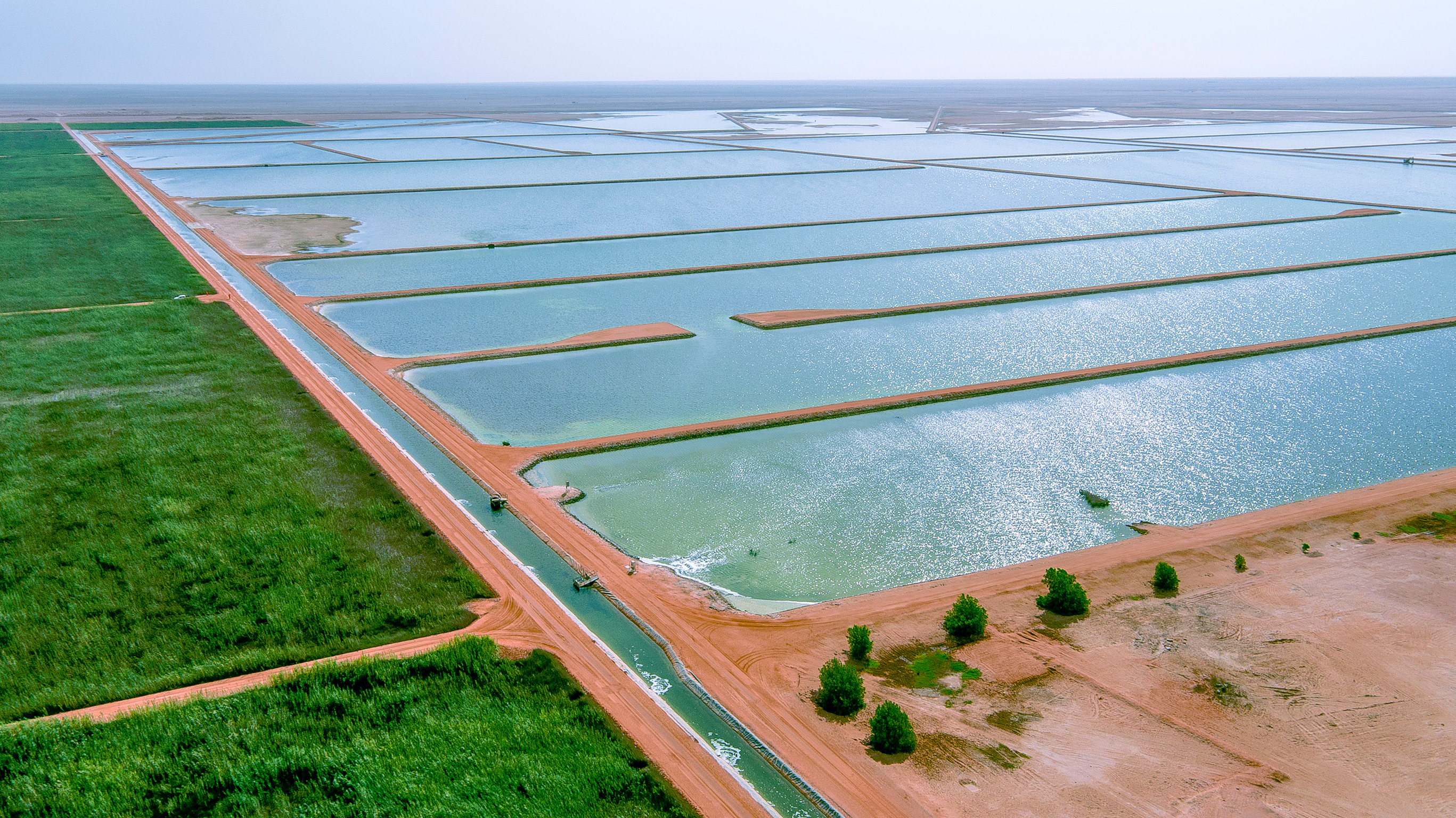
In the midst of a desert landscape, BAUER Nimr LLC in Oman operates the world's largest commercial, natural reed bed water treatment plant.

PDO has been awarded more than 50 different honors since 2011.

Since 2011, PDO has received various awards for the Nimr Reed Beds water treatment plant, including The Global Water Award, presented to BAUER water by Kofi Annan in 2011, the Shell Award for the Best Innovative Project. In 2012 PDO won the Oman Green Innovation Award, the ADIPEC Best MENA Oil and Gas HSE Award and an award for Excellence in Environmental Project and Products by the Regional Clean Sea Organisation (RECSO) that same year. In 2013, PDO won almost 20 awards, including different awards for their Amal Solar project, the Oman Green Innovation Awards for the Ras Al Hamra International School. In 2015, PDO won four different Shell Impact International Impact Awards. Amongst the awards in 2016, the company was awarded the APIPEC award for Best Oil and Gas Corporate Social Responsibility (CSR) Project, and the Best Practice Award for early monetization of new discoveries through Early Development Facilities.

== Miscellaneous ==
PDO has a Diversity & Inclusion (D&I) team of 20 employees that work to create an environment free from any form of harassment and discrimination.

In 2017, PDO donated six fire trucks to the International College of Engineering & Management (ICEM) and announced to support 18 new initiatives in Oman, focusing on health and safety, community infrastructure, employability training, charities, and animal welfare.

== See also ==
- Economy of Oman
- List of companies of Oman

== Bibliography ==
- Clark, Sir Terence, From Underground to Overseas: The Story of Petroleum Development Oman, Stacey International 2007, ISBN 978-1-905299-46-1.
