= RAFO Musannah =

Omani airbase

- Muladdah, Al Batinah South in Oman

Site information
- Type: Air base
- Code: OOMN
- Owner: Sultan of Oman's Armed Forces
- Operator: Royal Air Force of Oman

Location
- Shown within Oman
- Coordinates: 23°38′29″N 57°29′25″E

Site history
- Built: 2005
- In use: 2005-present

Airfield information
- Identifiers: ICAO: OOMN
- Elevation: 103 metres (338 ft) AMSL
Runways
Direction	Length and surface
08/26	4,000 metres (13,123 ft) Asphalt

RAFO Musannah (ICAO: OOMN) is a Royal Air Force of Oman air base located 26.5 miles (42.6 km) south west of Barka, Al Batinah South, Oman.

== History ==
Work started on the new air base in 2005 initially with the building of a helicopter apron and hangar to the northwest of the present runway, this was followed by the construction of the runway and two concrete aprons (one to north and one to the northeast) during 2008 and 2009. Work on the southern side started during 2010 and a consisted on a large apron, hangar and additional smaller buildings. During 2012 the southern apron was extended by 25% adding two extra parking stands and another entrance to the taxiway.

Between 2009 and 2011 accommodation was built for the personnel of the new NHIndustries NH90's coming into service.

== Current use ==
NHIndustries NH90's are based here.

During May 2015 it was announced that No. 902 Expeditionary Air Wing RAF has deployed to the base with the Royal Navy's AgustaWestland Merlin HM.2's as part of Operation Kipion.
