= Fahud =

Oil field in Oman

Coordinates: 22°19′00″N 56°33′00″E

Fahud is a permanent oil camp and oil field in the middle of the central plain area of Oman, named after the nearby Jebel Fahud believed to mean "Leopard Mountain" from the time when wild leopards roamed the area. The main oil camp is owned by Petroleum Development Oman (PDO), the national oil company.

Oil operations commenced in 1954 when a PDO survey party arrived at the jebel and began surveying it. The first well at Jebel Fahud was completed at 12,235 feet in May 1957. Unfortunately, it was a dry hole except for a very small quantity of gas and oil. Three of the PDO partners decided to withdraw from the Omani concession, leaving Shell (85%) and Partex (15%) to take it over and resume exploration. Only a few hundred yards from the original test well site, a second test well was sunk at Fahud and, in 1964, found oil in commercial quantities.

== Climate ==
Fahud has a hot desert climate (BWh) according to the Köppen climate classification.

Climate data for Fahud (1991–2020 normals, extremes 1993–2023 )
Month	Jan	Feb	Mar	Apr	May	Jun	Jul	Aug	Sep	Oct	Nov	Dec	Year
Record high °C (°F)	33.3 (91.9)	37.9 (100.2)	41.7 (107.1)	43.7 (110.7)	49.9 (121.8)	50.5 (122.9)	49.5 (121.1)	48.6 (119.5)	46.9 (116.4)	44.9 (112.8)	38.3 (100.9)	34.2 (93.6)	50.5 (122.9)
Mean daily maximum °C (°F)	27.2 (81.0)	29.4 (84.9)	33.2 (91.8)	38.2 (100.8)	43.1 (109.6)	45.1 (113.2)	45.0 (113.0)	43.4 (110.1)	41.2 (106.2)	38.0 (100.4)	32.4 (90.3)	28.6 (83.5)	37.1 (98.7)
Daily mean °C (°F)	19.8 (67.6)	21.7 (71.1)	25.4 (77.7)	30.0 (86.0)	34.6 (94.3)	36.7 (98.1)	37.1 (98.8)	35.9 (96.6)	33.4 (92.1)	30.3 (86.5)	25.0 (77.0)	21.7 (71.1)	29.3 (84.7)
Mean daily minimum °C (°F)	12.2 (54.0)	14.0 (57.2)	17.6 (63.7)	21.8 (71.2)	26.1 (79.0)	28.1 (82.6)	29.3 (84.7)	28.0 (82.4)	25.6 (78.1)	22.4 (72.3)	17.7 (63.9)	14.5 (58.1)	21.4 (70.6)
Record low °C (°F)	7.0 (44.6)	6.3 (43.3)	9.6 (49.3)	14.3 (57.7)	17.4 (63.3)	22.3 (72.1)	23.6 (74.5)	22.6 (72.7)	19.2 (66.6)	15.6 (60.1)	11.1 (52.0)	7.4 (45.3)	6.3 (43.3)
Average precipitation mm (inches)	1.3 (0.05)	0.0 (0.0)	2.0 (0.08)	6.6 (0.26)	0.3 (0.01)	2.2 (0.09)	0.0 (0.0)	1.8 (0.07)	0.5 (0.02)	0.3 (0.01)	1.1 (0.04)	0.4 (0.02)	16.5 (0.65)
Source 1: World Meteorological Organization (preciptiation 2000–2009)
Source 2: Starlings Roost Weather
