= Yibal =

Oilfield in Oman

- Location of the Yibal oil field within Oman
- Country: Oman
- Location: Onshore
- Coordinates: 22°10′0″N 56°0′0″E
- Operators: Petroleum Development Oman

Field history
- Start of production: 1968

Production
- Current production of oil: 88,000 barrels per day (~4.4×10^{6} t/a)
- Peak of production (oil): 250,000 barrels per day (~1.2×10^{7} t/a)

Yibal is the largest oilfield in Oman, located in the Ad Dhahirah Governorate, about 360km southwest of Muscat. It began production in 1968, and at its peak, produced nearly 250,000 barrels per day (40,000 m^{3}/d). Production declined in the following years, with output around 88,000 barrels per day (14,000 m^{3}/d) by 2015. The Yibal oil field is operated primarily by Petroleum Development Oman.

== Yibal Khuff Project ==
UK-based Petrofac was selected to oversee the development of the giant Yibal Khuff project as part of an engineering, procurement and construction management contract in 2015. Petrofac said at the time that the contract value was around $900 million.

The Yibal Khuff Project (YKP) began operations in September 2021 employing 1,200 Omanis and 200 foreign nationals. At full capacity, the project is expected to produce five million cubic metres of gas per day and approximately 20,000 barrels of crude oil daily.
