= Transport in Oman =

Transportation networks and infrastructure in Oman

This article is about transport in Oman.

== Road Infrastructure ==
Sultan Qaboos Street

total: 62,240 km
paved: 29,685 km (including 1943 km of expressways)
unpaved: 30,545 km (2012)

Oman is consistently ranked among the ten countries with the best road infrastructure, famously known for its resilient and efficient road design in a relatively mountainous and uneven terrain. It is the second Arab nation among the countries alongside its neighbour, the United Arab Emirates.

=== Omani road numbering system ===
As of 2025, Oman has a total of 415 numbered roads classified into five categories. These categories are:

- 10 national roads which serves long distance high-speed travel that connects major cities and international border crossings together.
- 13 arterial roads serving medium distance travel that link areas to national roads and provides access to rural areas.
- 37 secondary roads providing links between towns and serve urban areas with high traffic volumes.
- 223 distributor roads linking areas that generate high traffic volumes such as urban areas and village centers while also linking them to arterial roads and secondary roads.
- 132 local roads which provides links to tourist attractions.

Oman has 3 expressway-grade highways: Muscat Expressway, a 54-kilometre highway running from Al Qurum area of Muscat to Halban area on the outskirts of Muscat. Al Batinah Expressway is a 256-kilometre, 8-lane highway that continues from the Muscat Expressway in Halban up to the Oman-UAE border at Khatmat Malaha.

Other roads in Muscat Governorate and some cities such as Sohar, Salalah and Nizwa are dual-carriageways, with four or six lanes each with a speed limit ranging from 60 to 120 km/h; while in the rest of Oman, the roads are mostly single-carriageways.

=== Links to neighboring countries ===
- United Arab Emirates: Oman has several good road connections at Buraimi (Al Ain), Waddi Hatta (Wajaja), Aswad via the S10, Khamat Mulahah (Fujairah) via the N5 and Tibat via the A13.
- Yemen: Route 47: Raysut to Sarfait in Oman - Yemen border. The road then goes to Hawf, Al Faydami, Al Ghaydah. Another road is from Thumrait to Al Mazyonah in Oman - Yemen border. The road then goes to Shisan, Al Kurah, Al Ghaydah.
- Saudi Arabia: Rub-el-Khali Highway: A 161km road that starts from Ibri and ends at the border checkpoint between Oman and Saudi Arabia.

== Railways ==
There are no mainline railways in Oman, but some are planned, including links to adjacent countries. The narrow gauge Al Hoota Cave Train takes tourists into the cave complex on a journey of 4 minutes across a 400m distance. The estimated total length of the future Oman National Railway network is 2,135 km. It will be divided into several segments linking Oman's borders with the UAE to Muscat, as part of the GCC Railway Network and also to the southern parts of the country - Port of Al Duqm, the Port of Salalah and the Yemen border. However, the Gulf Railway project was suspended in 2016. The government of Oman announced it will proceed with its own planned national railway network.

=== Timeline ===
2008

Joint Gulf Railway proposed to link gulf states at cost of $14 billion by 2014.

2010

Bids are invited for construction of a rail network in three phases: The first phase would be a double-track electrified coastal route from Masqat to Suhar; the second phase would be an extension from Masqat to Daq; the third phase an extension from Suhar to Al Ain in the UAE. Later, an extension to Salalah was considered. The construction was expected to start in 2012, and to be completed by 2018.

2011

In September, the Supreme Committee for Town Planning, which was in charge of the project since the beginning, handed it to the Ministry of Transport and Communications (MOTC). Shortly, the Ministry of Transport began preparing for launching initial tenders for project design and consultancy.

2012

In September, the Ministry of Transport and Communications, through the Government Tender Board, announced it will re-float its tender for the first phase into three stages: one to get the preliminary design, another for the detailed design and building, and third for the management consultancy and supervision services.

2013

In March, the Ministry of Transport announced the opening of a tender for the preliminary design of nine freight yards for the first phase of the project. The largest yards, at Sohar and Duqm, are planned at either end of the network, as they will be intended to manage the freight volumes handled by the industrial ports at those sites. In July, through assistance from German company Dorsch-Gruppe, the Government Tender Board opened the competition for the first stage with a 13.6 million Omani riyals (US$35.3 million) contract that covers preliminary design consultancy services, which was awarded to Italian company Italferr.

In September, Ahmed bin Mohammed Al Futaisi, the Omani Minister of Transport and Communications, asked private companies to think about investing in the railway project. At this point, the project was reported to have created 70,000 new jobs in the Sultanate.

2014

In 2014, Oman Rail announced a pre-qualification tender for the initial stage of the network, which includes providing infrastructure technology systems and the construction of the first section that extends from Oman's border to Al Buraimi, UAE, to the port of Sohar. The cost of this stage was estimated at $2.6 billion, out of the estimated total cost of $14 billion. The first phase was supposed to include a 242-km line from Al Misfah in Muscat to Sohar Port, with a 20-km link to Muscat Central Station and an 8-km spur to a railway yard at Sohar. There is also a 486-km line from Muscat to Duqm Port and 84 km between Sinaw and Ibra in Oman’s east. In addition to a 136-km track from Suhar to Al Ain in the UAE, with a 27-km spur to the town of Buraimi, and a 58-km track from Suhar to Khatmat Al Malaha, another border crossing.

2015

In February 2015, the Government Tender Board selected a consortium headed by Spanish engineering contractor Técnicas Reunidas to provide project management consultancy services for the network.

2016

The GCC Railway project was suspended in 2016 after some partner countries decided to hold their rail plans due to the decline in oil price. However, the government of Oman had announced that it will continue with its national rail network.

2021

In June 2021, the government of Oman announced the planning for the first metro and passenger rail services that would link Muscat City and its major airports. The metro network would extend from Ruwi and Muttrah to Muscat International Airport and Seeb.

2023

In February 2023, an agreement was signed for development of a route linking the port of Sohar to the UAE railway network. It will be overseen by the Oman and Etihad Rail Company.

== Pipelines ==
crude oil 1,300 km; natural gas 1,030 km

== Ports and harbors ==
=== Gulf of Oman ===
- Al Wajajah
- Port Sultan Qaboos, Muttrah
- Mina al Fahal
- Port of Sohar

=== Arabian Sea ===
- Port of Salalah
- Duqm Port
- Mina' Raysut

== Merchant marine ==
total: 3 ships (1,000 GT or over) totaling 16,306 GT/8,210 tonnes deadweight (DWT)
ships by type: cargo 1, passenger 1, passenger/cargo 1 (1999 est.)

== Airports ==
=== Airports with scheduled air service ===
- Muscat International Airport
- Salalah International Airport
- Duqm Jaaluni Airport
- Khasab Airport

=== Airports - with unpaved runways ===
total: 136
over 3,047 m: 2
2,438 to 3,047 m: 6
1,524 to 2,437 m: 56
914 to 1,523 m: 37
under 914 m: 35 (1999 est.)

== See also ==
- List of airports in Oman
- Oman Air
- Railway stations in Oman
- North-South Transport Corridor
- Ashgabat Agreement, a Multimodal transport agreement signed by India, Oman, Iran, Turkmenistan, Uzbekistan and Kazakhstan, for creating an international transport and transit corridor facilitating transportation of goods between Central Asia and the Persian Gulf.
