= List of airports in the United Arab Emirates =

This is a list of airports in the United Arab Emirates, sorted by location. Airports in bold have commercial service.

Airport name	IATA	Location	Emirate	ICAO	Coordinates
**Zayed International Airport**	AUH	Abu Dhabi	Abu Dhabi	OMAA	24°25′59″N 054°39′04″E
Al Bateen Executive Airport	AZI	Abu Dhabi	Abu Dhabi	OMAD	24°25′42″N 054°27′29″E
**Al Ain International Airport**	AAN	Al Ain	Abu Dhabi	OMAL	24°15′42″N 055°36′33″E
Al Dhafra Air Base	DHF	Al Dhafra	Abu Dhabi	OMAM	24°14′54″N 054°32′42″E
Futaysi Airport		Al Futaisi	Abu Dhabi	OMAF	24°22′44″N 054°18′58″E
Al Jazeirah Airport		Al Jazirah Al Hamra	Ras al-Khaimah	OMRJ	25°39′55″N 055°46′27″E
Arzanah Airport		Arzanah	Abu Dhabi	OMAR	24°46′51″N 052°33′35″E
Buhasa Airport		Buhasa	Abu Dhabi	OMAB	23°35′59″N 053°22′46″E
**Dalma Airport**	ZDY	Dalma Island	Abu Dhabi	OMDL	24°30′11″N 052°20′09″E
Das Island Airport		Das Island	Abu Dhabi	OMAS	25°08′30″N 052°52′20″E
Abu Dhabi Northeast Airport			Abu Dhabi	OMAW	24°31′08″N 054°58′48″E
**Dubai International Airport**	DXB	Dubai	Dubai	OMDB	25°15′10″N 055°21′52″E
Al Minhad Air Base	NHD	Dubai	Dubai	OMDM	25°01′37″N 055°21′58″E
**Al Maktoum International Airport** (Dubai World Central Airport)	DWC	Dubai	Dubai	OMDW	24°55′06″N 055°10′32″E
**Fujairah International Airport**	FJR	Fujairah	Fujairah	OMFJ	25°06′44″N 056°19′27″E
Jebel Dhana Airport		Jebel Dhana	Abu Dhabi	OMAJ	24°10′55″N 052°37′25″E
Qarnayn Airport		Qarnayn	Abu Dhabi	OMAQ	24°56′00″N 052°51′00″E
**Ras Al Khaimah International Airport**	RKT	Ras al-Khaimah	Ras al-Khaimah	OMRK	25°36′48″N 055°56′20″E
Al Saqr Field Airport		Ras al-Khaimah	Ras al-Khaimah	OMRS	25°36′48″N 055°57′34″E
**Sharjah International Airport**	SHJ	Sharjah	Sharjah	OMSJ	25°19′43″N 055°31′02″E
**Sir Bani Yas Airport**	XSB	Sir Bani Yas	Abu Dhabi	OMBY	24°16′56″N 052°34′56″E
Zirku Airport		Zirku	Abu Dhabi	OMAZ	24°51′48″N 053°04′33″E

== See also ==
- Transport in the United Arab Emirates
- List of the busiest airports in the Middle East
- List of airports by ICAO code: O#OM - United Arab Emirates
- Wikipedia: WikiProject Aviation/Airline destination lists: Asia#United Arab Emirates
