= Abu Dhabi Company for Onshore Oil Operations =

The Abu Dhabi Company for Onshore Petroleum Operations Ltd. (ADCO) was the former name of the oil company now known as ADNOC Onshore. ADCO was established on 2 December 1971 and operated onshore and in shallow coastal waters of the Emirate of Abu Dhabi, one of the seven members of the United Arab Emirates. In 2018, parent company Abu Dhabi National Oil Company (Adnoc) renamed the company ADNOC Onshore as part of a rebranding across its subsidiaries.

The original concession agreement was made with Petroleum Development (Trucial Coast) Ltd on 11 January 1939, but geological work did not begin until after the Second World War. Exploratory drilling began in Abu Dhabi in February 1950.

The first commercial oil discovery was made at Bab in 1960, and exports began from the Jebel Dhanna terminal on 14 December 1963. In 1962, the company was renamed the Abu Dhabi Petroleum Company, ADPC. On 1 January 1973, the Government of Abu Dhabi acquired a 25% interest, which was increased to 60% as from 1 January 1974. The Government interest is held by the Abu Dhabi National Oil Company, ADNOC.

ADCO was incorporated under Law No. 14 for 1978, on 8 October 1978 and has been responsible, since February 1979, for operations in the concession area, which after relinquishments, now covers more than 21,000 km^{2} (8,100 sq mi).

In 2018, ADNOC brought together its people, resources, products and services together under a unified brand. Abu Dhabi Company for Onshore Petroleum Operations Ltd. (ADCO) was renamed ADNOC Onshore.

The Company produces mainly from six oil fields:

- Asab
- Sahil
- Shah
- Bab
- Buhasa
- North-East Bab (Dabbiya, Rumaitha and Shanayel)

The company also operates Buhasa Airport and Jebel Dhana Airport
