= Emirates (airline) =

Flag carrier airline of the United Arab Emirates

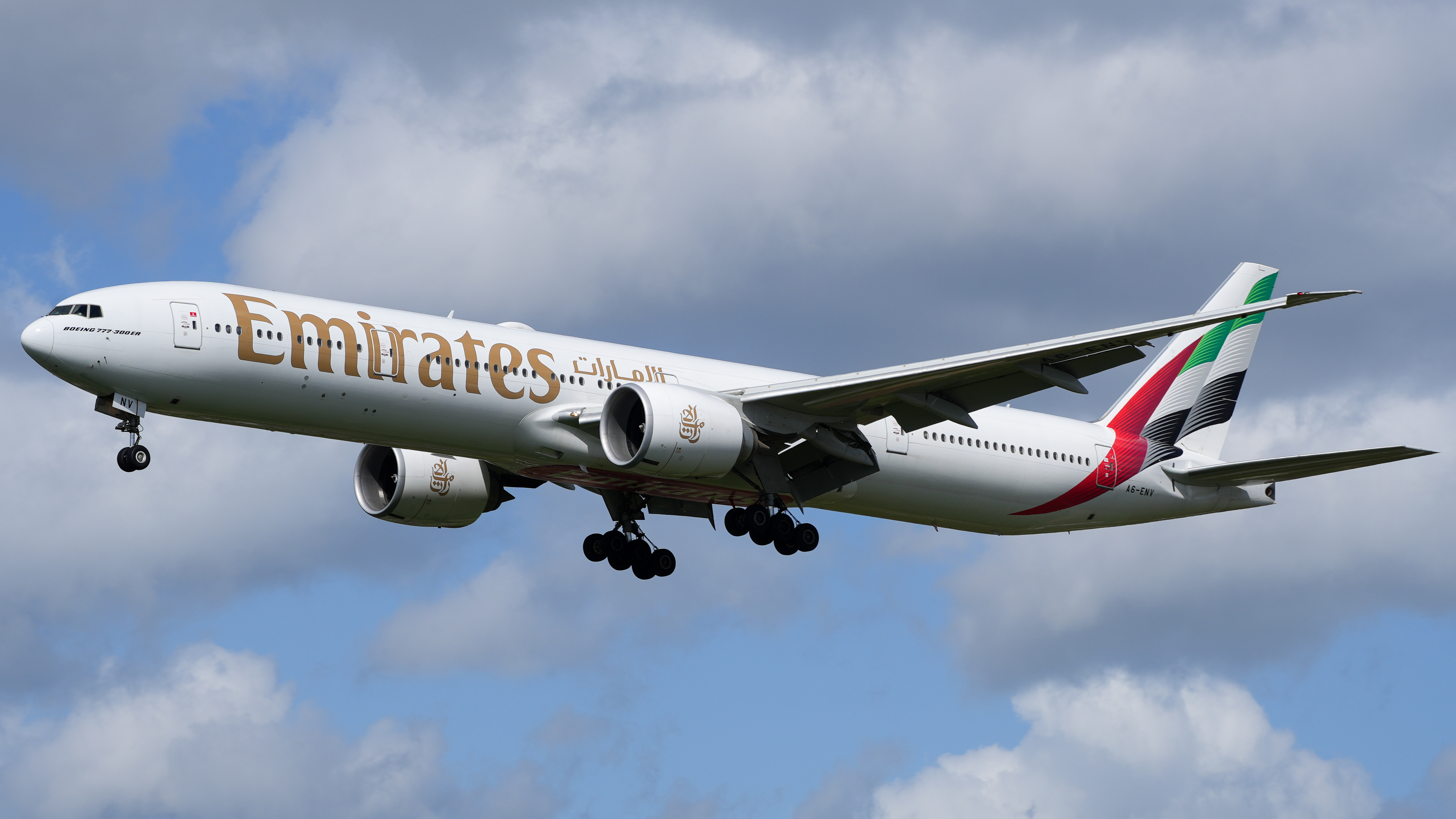
- An Emirates Boeing 777-300ER
IATA	ICAO	Call sign
EK	UAE	EMIRATES
- Founded: 15 March 1985; 41 years ago
- Commenced operations: 25 October 1985; 41 years ago
- Hubs: Dubai
- Frequent-flyer program: Emirates Skywards
- Subsidiaries: Arabian Adventures; Congress Solutions International; Emirates Holidays; Emirates Tours
- Fleet size: 261
- Destinations: 148
- Parent company: The Emirates Group
- Headquarters: Al Garhoud, Dubai, UAE
- Key people: Tim Clark (president); Ahmed bin Saeed Al Maktoum (chairman and CEO)
- Founder: Ahmed bin Saeed Al Maktoum
- Revenue: ▲US$34.83 billion (2024–25)
- Net income: ▲US$5.19 billion (2024–25)
- Employees: 69,465 (2024–25)
- Website: www.emirates.com

Emirates (Note: Arabic: طَيَران الإمارات, romanized: Ṭayarāan Al-Imārāt) is one of the two flag carrier airlines of the United Arab Emirates (the other being Etihad Airways). Based in Al Garhoud, Dubai, the airline is a subsidiary of The Emirates Group, which is owned by the government of Dubai's Investment Corporation of Dubai. It is the world's largest long haul airline as well as the largest airline in the Middle East, operating more than 3,600 flights per week from its hub at Terminal 3 of Dubai International Airport. It operates in more than 150 cities in 80 countries across six continents on its fleet of over 250 aircraft. Cargo operations are undertaken by Emirates SkyCargo.

Emirates is the world's third-largest airline by scheduled revenue passenger-kilometers flown. It is also the second-largest in terms of freight tonne-kilometers flown.

During the mid 1980s, Gulf Air began to cut back its services to Dubai. As a result, Emirates was founded on 15 March 1985, with backing from Dubai's royal family and its first two aircraft provided by Pakistan International Airlines. With $10 million in start-up capital, it was required to operate independently of government subsidies. Pakistan International Airlines also provided free training facilities to Emirates cabin crew at Karachi Airport. The airline was founded by Ahmed bin Saeed Al Maktoum, the airline's present chairman. In the years following its founding, the airline rapidly expanded both its fleet and its destinations. In October 2008, Emirates moved all of its operations at Dubai International Airport to Terminal 3.

Emirates operates a mixed fleet of Airbus and Boeing wide-body aircraft and is one of the few airlines to operate an all-wide-body aircraft fleet (excluding Emirates Executive). As of January 2026, Emirates is the world's largest Airbus A380 operator with 116 aircraft in service. Since its introduction, the Airbus A380 has become an integral part of the Emirates fleet, especially on long-haul, high-density routes. Emirates is also the world's largest Boeing 777 operator with 133 aircraft in service.

The airline has received several awards, including of "Best Overall Airline in the Middle East" at the 2026 APEX Awards.

== History ==
Emirates was founded in March 1985 with backing from Dubai's ruler, Mohammed bin Rashid Al Maktoum.

During its early years, Emirates experienced strong growth, averaging 30% annually. The Gulf War helped boost business for the airline as it was the only airline to continue flying in the last ten days of the war. In June 1991 shortly after the end of the hostilities caused by the Gulf War, Emirates finally managed to acquire slots at London Heathrow. In 1996, Emirates took delivery of its baseline Boeing 777-200, followed by the extended-range version in 1997 and in 1999 the Airbus A330-200 and Boeing 777-300. In 2000, the airline placed an order for a large number of aircraft, including the Boeing 777-300ER and the Airbus A380, and also launched its frequent flyer program, Skywards.

Since then, the airline has continued to expand its fleet and network, with a focus on operating flights to anywhere in the world via Dubai and competing with other major airlines on international routes. Its growth has attracted criticism from other carriers, who claim that the airline has unfair advantages and have called for an end to open-skies policies with the UAE as a result. In 2017, Emirates "renewed its aircraft buying spree" and agreed to buy a number of Boeing's 787 Dreamliners for $15.1 billion. The Wall Street Journal described the deal as a "painful loss" for Airbus. In 2023, Emirates ordered $50 billion of Boeing jets with their sister airline, flyDubai at the Dubai Airshow. Emirates ordered 90 aircraft, including both versions of the new long-haul jet.

In April 2024, Emirates announced its plan to relocate its hub to Al Maktoum Airport (DWC) when the new airport is fully completed. In 2026, Emirates temporarily suspended operations due to the Iran War.

== Corporate management ==
Emirates President Sir Tim Clark at the 2026 World Government Summit

The airline is a subsidiary of The Emirates Group, which is a subsidiary of the Dubai government's investment company, Investment Corporation of Dubai. The airline has recorded a profit every year, except its second year, and the growth has never fallen below 20% a year. In its first 11 years, it doubled in size every 3.5 years and has every four years since.

In 2015, Emirates paid dividends worth AED 2.6 billion (US$708 million), compared to AED 1 billion (US$272 million) in 2014. The government has received AED 14.6 billion from Emirates since dividends started being paid in 1999 for having provided an initial start-up capital of US$10 million and an additional investment of about US$80 million at the time of the airline's inception. The Dubai government is the sole owner of the company, but it does not invest any new money into it or interfere with the airline's operations.

=== Structure and employment ===
Emirates has diversified into related industries and sectors, including airport services, engineering, catering, and tour operator operations. Emirates has seven subsidiaries and its parent company has more than 50. At the end of the fiscal year on 31 March 2020, the company employed a total of 59,519 staff, of which 21,789 were cabin crew, 4,313 were flight deck crew, 3,316 were in engineering, 12,627 were listed as other, 5,376 employees were at overseas stations, and 12,098 were at subsidiary companies. The Emirates Group employed a total of 105,730 employees.

Emirates provides its employees with benefits such as comprehensive health plans and paid maternity and sick leave. Another strategy employed by Emirates is to use profit sharing and merit pay as part of its competency-based approach to performance management. In 2023 and 2024, the group awarded its employees hefty bonuses as their share of the company's profits earned in those years. In 2023, employees got 24 weeks of pay as their bonus, and in 2024, they received 20 weeks of pay. In 2025, Emirates Group awarded its employees a 22-week bonus following a record-breaking profit of AED 22.7 billion—an 18% increase over the prior year.

=== Environmental record ===
The airline claims to have lower emissions than other airlines because its fleet has an average fuel burn of fewer than 4 liters for every 100 passenger–kilometers. In 2023, the airline announced it would invest $200 million over three years to fund research and development regarding the reduction of fossil fuels in commercial aviation, including investing in the development of alternative fuel and energy solutions.

=== Business trends ===
The key trends for Emirates are (as of the financial year ending 31 March):

	Turnover (AED b)	Net profit (Note: "Profit attributable to the Owner") (AED b)	Passengers flown (m)	Passenger load factor (%) (Note: "seat factor")	Cargo carried (000 tonnes)	Number of A380	Sources
1997	3.7	0.26	3.6	70.0	426	—	
1998	4.0	0.26	3.6	70.0	200	—	
1999	4.4	0.31	4.2	74.5	214	—	
2000	5.1	0.30	4.7	71.9	269	—	
2001	6.3	0.42	5.7	75.1	335	—	
2002	7.1	0.46	6.7	74.3	401	—	
2003	9.5	0.90	8.5	76.6	525	—	
2004	13.1	1.5	10.4	73.4	660	—	
2005	17.9	2.4	12.5	74.6	838	—	
2006	22.6	2.4	14.4	75.9	1,019	—	
2007	29.1	3.0	17.5	76.2	1,156	—	
2008	38.8	5.0	21.2	79.8	1,282	—	
2009	43.2	0.68	22.7	75.8	1,408	4	
2010	43.4	3.5	27.4	78.1	1,580	8	
2011	54.2	5.3	31.4	80.0	1,767	15	
2012	62.2	1.5	33.9	80.0	1,796	21	
2013	73.1	2.2	39.3	79.7	2,086	31	
2014	82.6	3.2	44.5	79.4	2,250	47	
2015	88.8	4.5	49.2	79.6	2,377	59	
2016	85.0	7.1	51.8	76.5	2,509	75	
2017	85.0	1.2	56.0	75.1	2,577	94	
2018	92.3	2.7	58.4	77.5	2,623	102	
2019	97.9	0.87	58.6	76.8	2,659	109	
2020	91.9	1.0	56.1	78.5	2,389	115	
2021	30.9	−20.2	6.5	44.3	1,873	113	
2022	59.1	−3.9	19.5	58.6	2,139	118	
2023	107	10.5	43.6	79.5	1,849	116	
2024	121	17.2	51.9	79.9	2,176	116	
2025	127	19.0	53.6	78.9	2,338	116	

== Branding ==
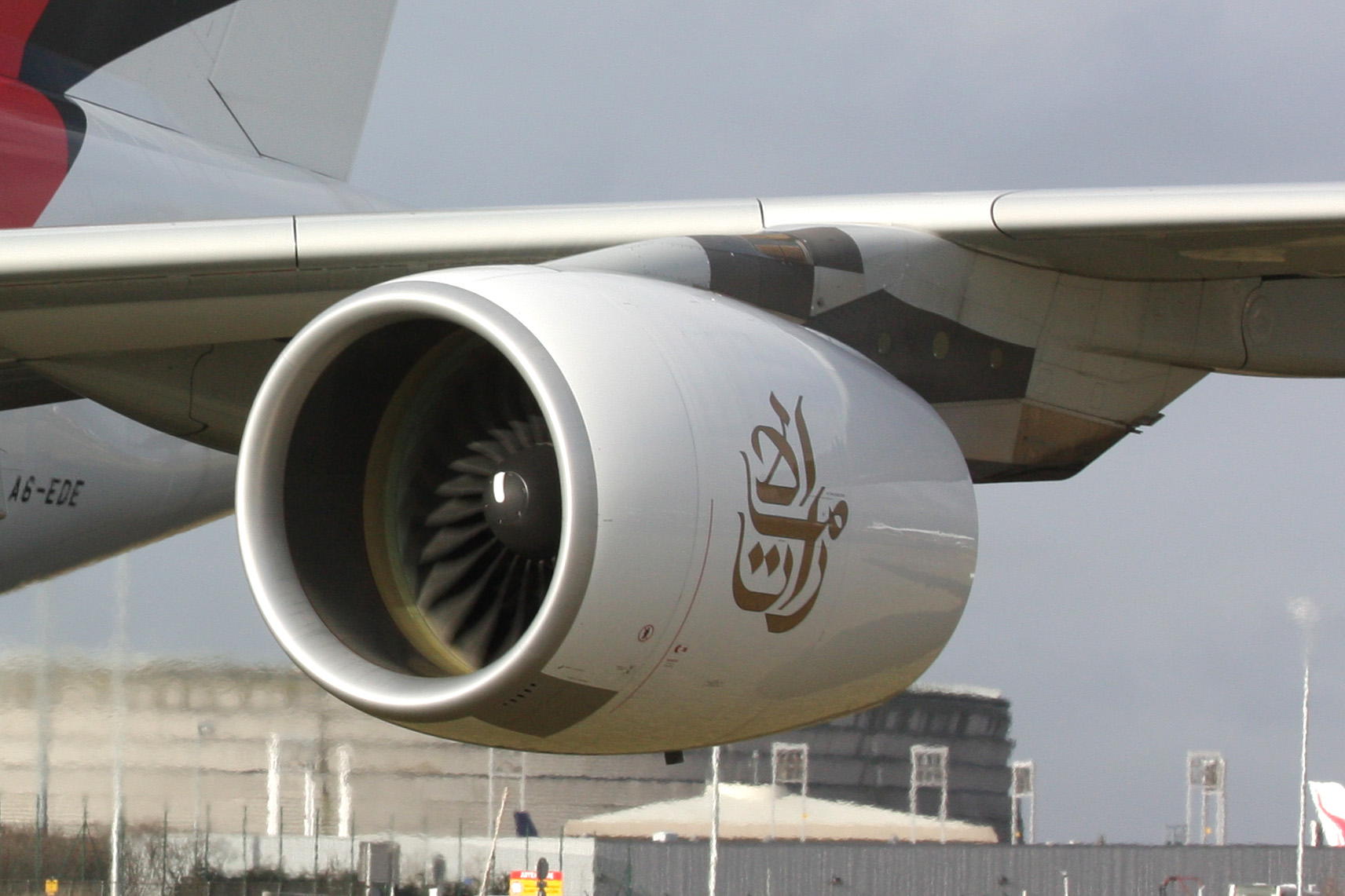
Emirates logo (in Arabic) painted on one of its Airbus A380-800's engines

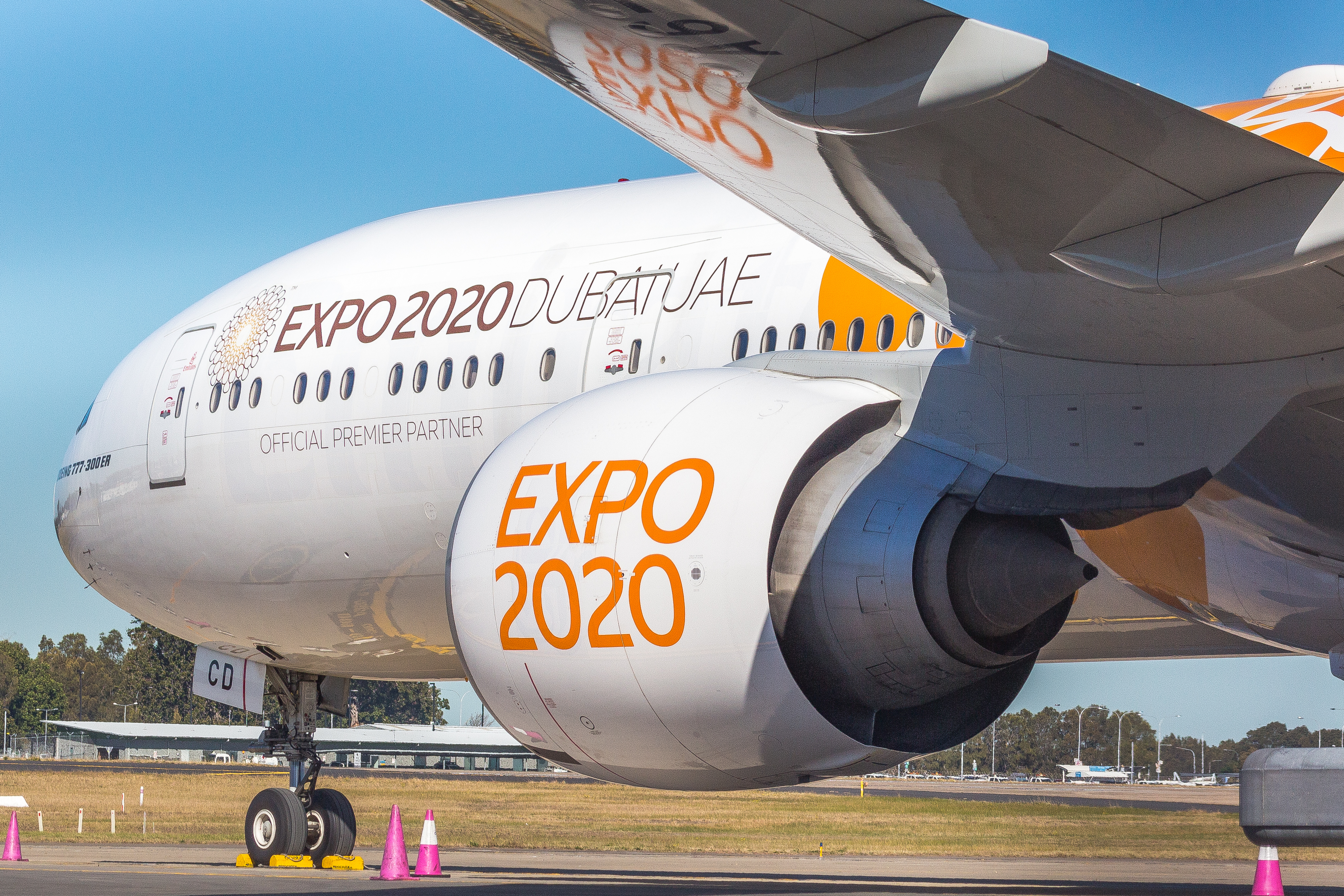
A Boeing 777-300ER (painted in the Expo 2020 orange livery) at Sydney Airport

In the 1990s, Emirates launched its first set of commercials all with the slogan "So be good to yourself, Fly Emirates". In 1999, it launched a rare A330-200 commercial with different pictures showing the aircraft painted in the original livery and the livery used from 1999 until 2023, which was launched a few months prior.

Commercials reappeared beginning in 2002 and the airline adopted the slogan "Fly Emirates. Keep Discovering" in 2004. In the 2010s, Emirates utilized multiple slogans in its advertising including "Fly Emirates. Keep Discovering", "Fly Emirates To over Six Continents", and "Hello Tomorrow". Emirates currently uses the slogan "Fly Better".

Emirates introduced a new uniform design in August 2008 for its 16,000 staff, designed by Simon Jersey. The offboard uniform includes the Emirates hat, red kick-pleats in the skirts, more fitted blouses, and the return of red leather shoes and handbags. For the onboard uniform, male and female cabin crew wear service waistcoats in place of the previously worn service jackets and tabards. The male flight attendants wear a chocolate brown suit, featuring pinstripes, with a cream shirt and caramel, honey, and red tie. Both male and female pursers wear this chocolate brown color but with no red featured.

Since its formation in 1985, Emirates aircraft have carried a section of the United Arab Emirates flag on the tail fins, a calligraphy version of the logo in Arabic on the engines, and the "Emirates" logo on the fuselage both in Arabic and English. The color scheme used since 1985 was changed in November 1999, with the first Boeing 777-300. This change included the modification of the logotype, the enlargement and movement of the English logo (the Arabic remaining smaller) towards the front of the aircraft, and a different, flowing flag on the tailfin.

In 2022, Emirates launched two commercials featuring a flight attendant standing on the spire of the Burj Khalifa. The first commercial was about the UAE moving to the UK's Amber list in the wake of the COVID-19 travel restrictions. The second commercial was to promote the Expo 2020 event with an Airbus A380, painted in a special livery, circling the woman. The woman in the videos was a qualified stunt-woman dressed as an Emirates flight attendant.

== Sponsorship ==
=== Infrastructure ===
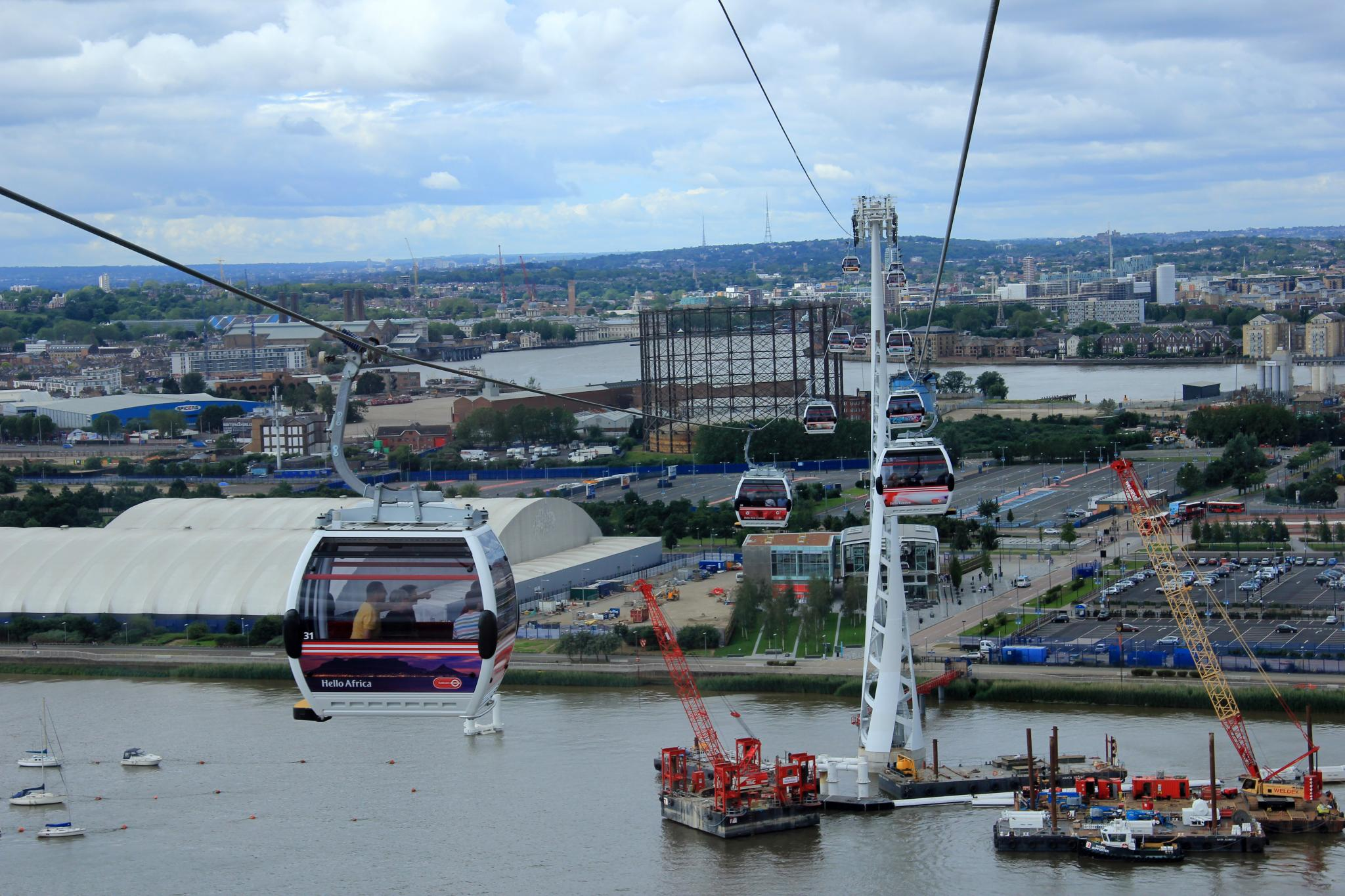
Emirates Air Line cable cars in London

From 2011 until 2022, Emirates sponsored the Emirates Air Line cable car over the River Thames in East London.

Since 2015, Emirates has sponsored the England-based Spinnaker Tower in Portsmouth on the south coast. The airline had £3.5 million worth of plans to paint the landmark red, but after discussion with the residents of Portsmouth and Southsea, Emirates agreed the tower was to be colored blue and gold, with red lettering of the Emirates sponsor, for the reason that Portsmouth F.C. (the local football team) is colored blue and rival football team Southampton F.C. is colored red. It is now named "Emirates Spinnaker Tower".

=== Sports ===
==== Cricket ====
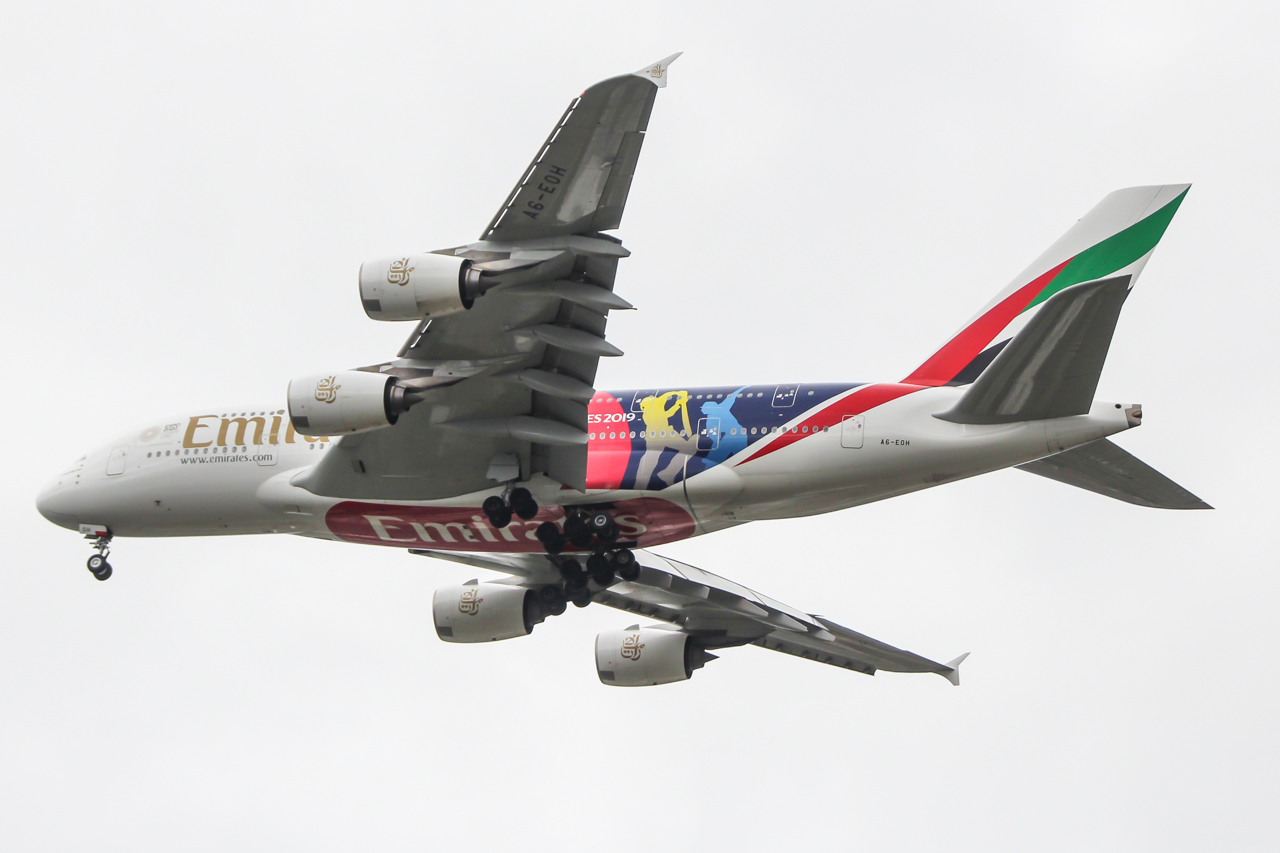
An Airbus A380 in a special livery for the 2019 Cricket World Cup

Emirates sponsors Cricket Australia, Lord's Taverners, and Pro Arch Tournament. Its branding also features on international cricket umpires' shirts. Emirates was also an official partner of the International Cricket Council. The deal gives Emirates association with all major ICC tournaments, including the 2011, 2015, and 2019 ICC Cricket World Cups, the Women's Cricket World Cups, ICC Champions Trophy, and ICC World Twenty20.

Emirates is the Twenty20 shirt sponsor of Durham County Cricket Club and holds the naming rights to the Riverside Ground, now known as Emirates Riverside, as well as the naming rights to the Emirates Old Trafford Cricket Ground, and is the shirt sponsor of Lancashire County Cricket Club. Emirates was also the major sponsor of the Kings XI Punjab (seasons two-four) and Deccan Chargers (season five), teams of the Indian Premier League, the largest domestic cricket tournament in the world.

==== Football ====
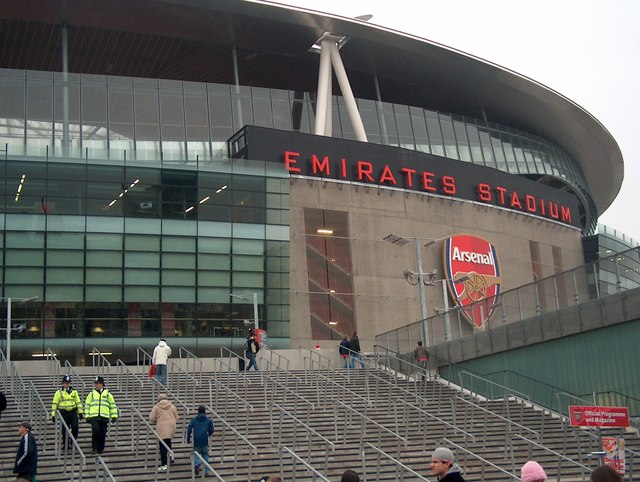
The Emirates Stadium in London, home ground of Arsenal F.C.

Emirates was a sponsor of FIFA and the FIFA World Cup, but stopped its sponsorship in early 2015 because of allegations of corruption and bribery within FIFA, as well as FIFA's controversial decision to award the 2022 FIFA World Cup to Qatar.

Emirates was the primary shirt sponsor of Chelsea from August 2001 until May 2005. Since the 2006–07 season, it has been the primary shirt sponsor of Arsenal (since the 2006–07 season, including Arsenal's home ground Emirates Stadium), AC Milan since the 2010–11 season, Real Madrid since the 2013–14 season, Benfica since the 2015–16 season, Olympique Lyonnais since the 2020–21 season, and Étoile du Sahel since the 2023–24 season. It was also the primary shirt sponsor for the second iteration of the New York Cosmos. Emirates is also the title sponsor of the FA Cup and Emirates Cup. It was also the primary shirt sponsor of Paris Saint-Germain (until May 2019), and Hamburger SV until June 2020.

In August 2009, the Scottish Junior Football Association announced that Emirates would sponsor its Scottish Cup competition. Emirates is the sponsor of Asian Football Confederation travel and play, in the AFC Champions League and AFF Suzuki Cup. It also sponsors FC Dallas in Major League Soccer.

Football clubs currently sponsored by Emirates

- Arsenal
- Arsenal WFC
- Lyon
- AC Milan
- AC Milan WFC
- Real Madrid
- Real Madrid B
- Real Madrid W
- Benfica
- Benfica B
- Benfica under-19
- Étoile du Sahel

==== Rugby ====
Emirates has sponsored the Super League Rugby League team, the Warrington Wolves between 2013 and 2017. The multi-year sponsorship cost has been touted as around £300,000 annually.

It is also the main sponsor of USA Rugby and the World Rugby panel of international referees. Since 2015, Emirates has sponsored the South African Super Rugby team, the Lions and has the naming rights of the team and the Ellis Park rugby stadium.

It also sponsors the Rugby World Cup since 2007 and the Women's Rugby World Cup starting in 2025.

==== Basketball ====
An A380 in NBA livery (A6-EOD)

On 23 September 2019, Emirates partnered with Beirut Basketball Club to sponsor their 2019–2020 season; the deal included branding opportunities during televised matches, social media activation rights, and game ticket allocations. The season was later canceled amidst the COVID-19 pandemic. Emirates later signed a multi-year sponsorship with the club in September 2023, becoming its official airline and jersey sponsor for the next three seasons.

On 8 February 2024, Emirates signed a multi-year partnership with the National Basketball Association (NBA) to become the official airline of the league. This deal also included getting the naming rights for the NBA Cup, becoming the Emirates NBA Cup starting in the 2024 season. Additionally, an Emirates patch would be added to NBA referee jerseys.

==== Other sports ====
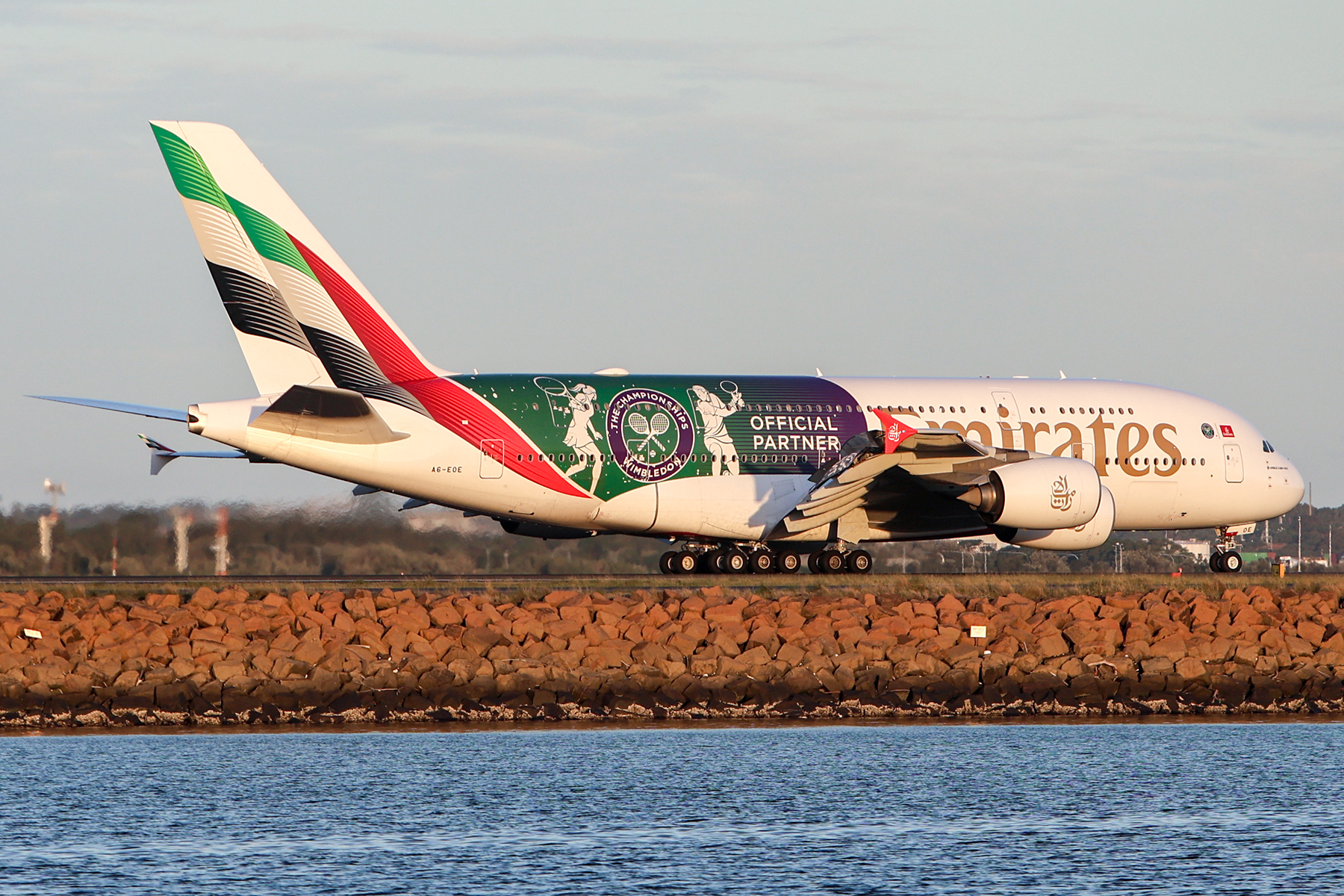
An A380 in Wimbledon livery (A6-EOE)

- Horse racing – Emirates sponsors the Dubai International Racing Carnival. It sponsored the Australian Turf Club's Autumn and Spring Carnival until 2011, and the Melbourne Cup Carnival from 2003 until 2017. It is also a regular sponsor of another equestrian sport, showjumping, notably at events in Dubai with the CSI5* Emirates Airline Dubai Grand Prix, and with the Longines Masters series, which currently runs CSI5* competitions in Hong Kong, Paris, and New York (formerly held in Los Angeles).
- Tennis – It sponsors all four major tennis tournaments: the Australian, French and US Opens, and Wimbledon (since 2024). Since the 2012 season, Emirates also sponsored the US Open Series, a six-week summer tennis season leading up to the US Open. Its sponsorship was to run until 2019.
- Formula One (F1) – It was the sponsor of the British F1 team McLaren in the 2006 season. It was also the official airline sponsor of Formula One from the 2013 season until the 2022 season. It was outbid by rival Qatar Airways for the 2023 season.
- Australian football – Emirates sponsors Collingwood Football Club in the Australian Football League.
- Baseball – Since the 2016 season, Emirates is the official airline of the Los Angeles Dodgers of Major League Baseball.
- Cycling – Since 2017, Emirates has been the sponsor of the UAE Team Emirates (former Team Lampre-Mérida), which is a UCI World Tour Cycling Team. Being a World Tour, the team obtains automatic entry to the Tour de France, Giro d'Italia, and Vuelta a Espana, as well as all the major one-day races.
- Sailing – Emirates is the primary sponsor of the Emirates Team New Zealand, winners of the 35th America's Cup in sailing.

=== Spokesperson ===
In 2015, Jennifer Aniston starred in two commercials for the airline. Since 2023, Penélope Cruz has been the brand ambassador for Emirates.

=== Expo 2020 ===
An A380 in Expo 2020–Opportunity livery (A6-EOU)

Emirates became one of the official premier partners of the Expo 2020 event hosted by Dubai. To commemorate the event, Emirates unveiled a special livery in three colors (orange, green, and blue) to represent the three themes of the event, namely, Opportunity, Sustainability, and Mobility. One of its A380s was painted in a blue, nose-to-tail livery that said, "Join The Making of a New World". The sponsorship lasted from 1 October 2021 till the event's closure on 31 March 2022.

== Network ==
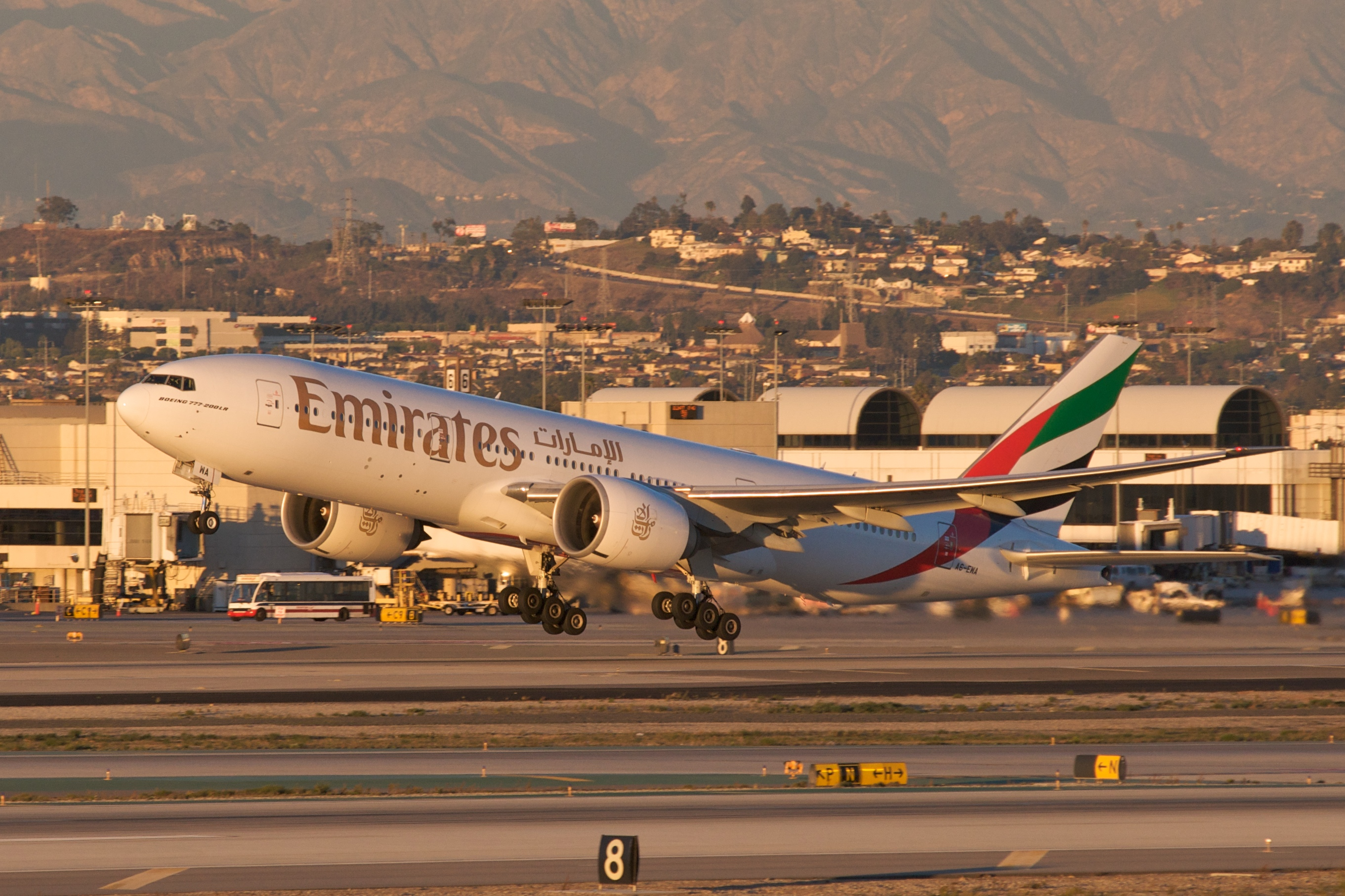
A Boeing 777-200LR taking off from Los Angeles, one of the airline's longest nonstop flights

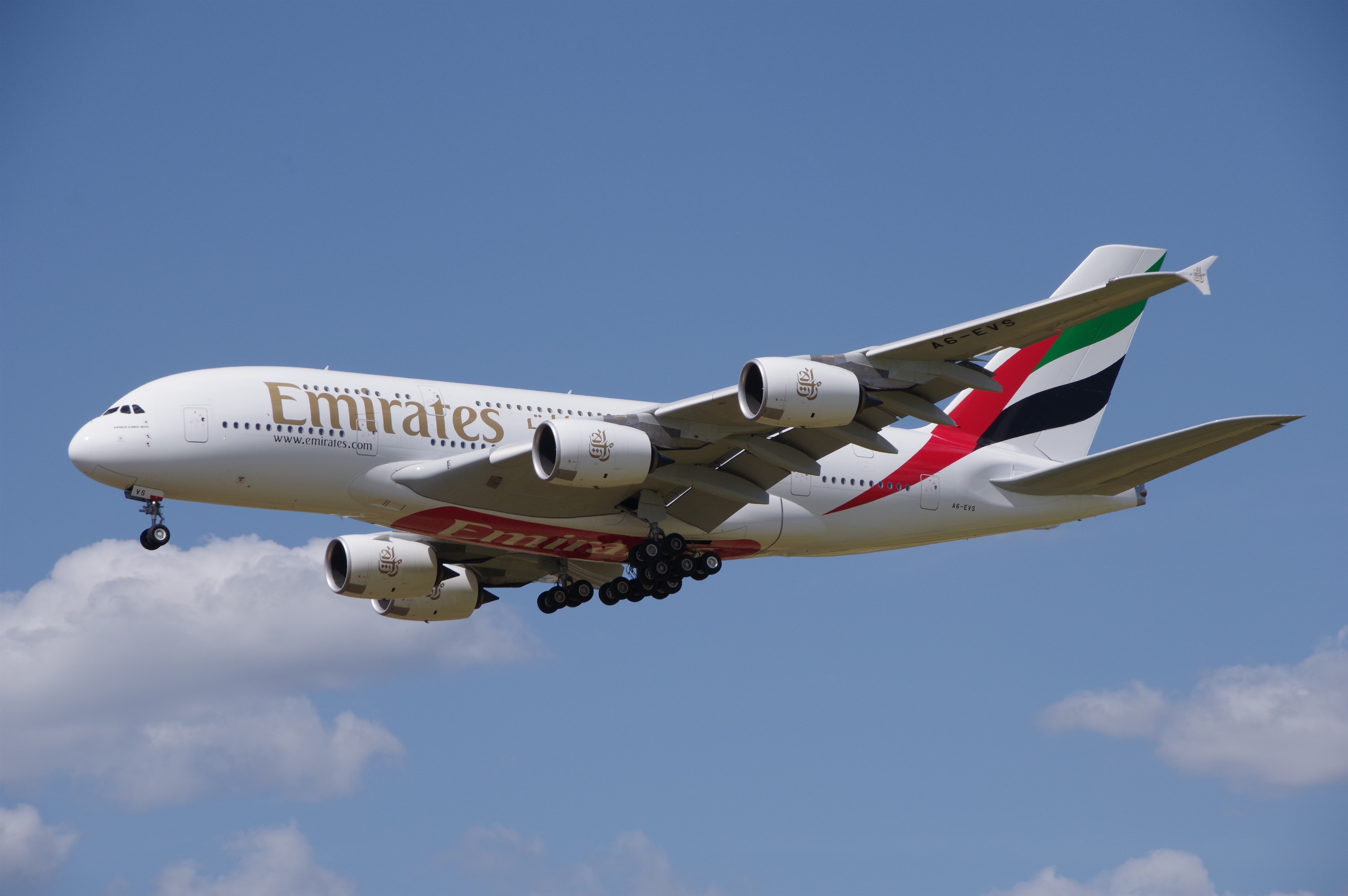
A6-EVS, the final Airbus A380 produced

As of August 2024, Emirates operates over 3,000 flights every week across its network of 137 destinations in 77 countries across six continents from its hub in Dubai. On 21 November 2024, Emirates added a 5th weekly flight to its Dubai-Antananarivo route, commencing on 13 December 2024 for a duration of 4 weeks, to cater for the surge in holidaymakers during the year-end festive season. A third daily flight was added for Mauritius on 1 December 2025 supplementing the two daily flights operated by the Airbus A380. The move saw an increase in capacity for the number of seats to Seychelles and Madagascar.

On 10 October 2024, it was reported that Emirates had relaunched direct flights to Adelaide Airport beginning 28 October 2024. The flight resumption to Adelaide was a fourth option for travelers to the United Kingdom or Europe after Malaysia Airlines, Singapore Airlines and Qatar Airways.

In March 2025, Emirates announced plans to expand its Asian network by introducing flights to three new destinations: Shenzhen in China, Da Nang in Vietnam, and Siem Reap in Cambodia. This expansion marks Emirates' fourth gateway into mainland China and its third into Vietnam. With these additions, the Dubai-based airline will now serve 49 destinations across Asia and the Pacific. This move aims to enhance connectivity and cater to the growing demand for travel in these regions.

=== Alliance ===
Emirates has partnerships with other airlines, but is not a member of any of the three global airline alliances – Oneworld, SkyTeam, or Star Alliance. In 2000, the airline briefly considered joining Star Alliance, but opted to remain independent. The reasoning for this was later revealed by the senior vice president of the airline's commercial operations worldwide: "Your ability to react in the marketplace is hindered because you need a consensus from your alliance partners".

=== Codeshare agreements ===
Emirates codeshares with the following airlines:

- Aegean Airlines
- Air Canada
- Air Mauritius
- Air Seychelles
- airBaltic
- Airlink
- Avianca
- Azul Brazilian Airlines
- Bangkok Airways
- Batik Air
- Batik Air Malaysia
- Caribbean Airlines
- China Southern Airlines
- Condor
- Copa Airlines
- flydubai
- Garuda Indonesia
- Gol Linhas Aéreas Inteligentes
- Gulf Air
- Icelandair
- ITA Airways
- Japan Airlines
- Jetstar
- Korean Air
- LATAM Brasil
- Qantas
- Renfe (railway)
- Royal Air Maroc
- S7 Airlines
- Swedish Railways (railway)
- SNCF (railway)
- SpiceJet
- TAP Air Portugal
- Thai Airways International
- Trenitalia (railway)
- Tunisair
- Uganda Airlines
- United Airlines
- WestJet

=== Interline agreements ===
Emirates have Interline agreements with the following airlines:

- Aer Lingus
- Africa World Airlines
- Air Algérie
- Air Burkina
- Air Caledonie
- Air China
- Air Peace
- Air Tahiti Nui
- All Nippon Airways
- Aurigny
- Biman Bangladesh Airlines
- China Airlines
- Condor
- Corsair International
- DAT
- Deutsche Bahn (railway)
- Etihad Airways
- Fiji Airways
- flydubai
- Japan Transocean Air
- Kam Air
- KTX (railway)
- Kuwait Airways
- Lao Airlines
- LATAM Ecuador
- Loganair
- Loong Air
- Maldivian
- Mandarin Airlines
- Mauritania Airlines
- Myanmar Airways International
- Nepal Airlines
- Philippine Airlines
- Royal Brunei Airlines
- Singapore Airlines
- Sun Express
- SriLankan Airlines
- Sky Express
- Starlux Airlines
- Swiss International Air Lines
- Swiss Railways (railway)
- Turkish Airlines

== Divisions ==
=== Emirates Executive ===
Emirates Executive was launched in 2013 for corporate and private charters. It operates a single Airbus ACJ319 business jet, accommodating 19 people. It features a mix of private suites and seating, a lounge, a dining area, and bathrooms with full-height showers.

=== Emirates SkyCargo ===
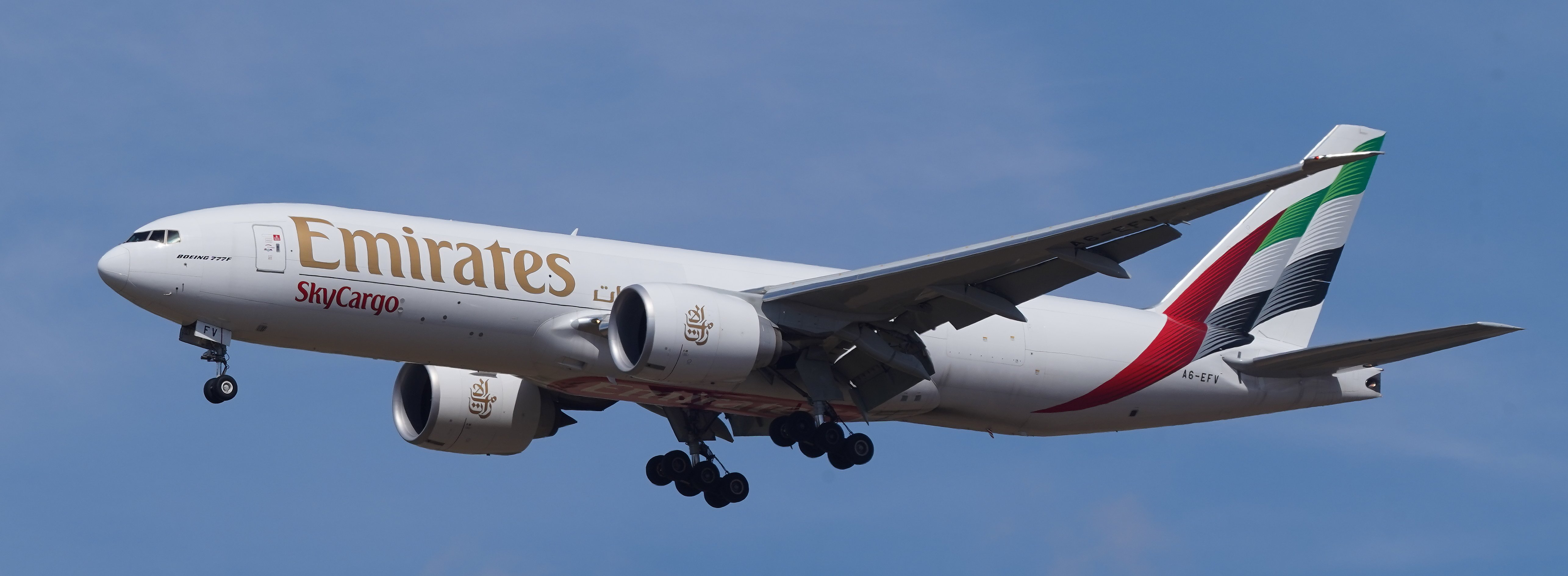
An Emirates SkyCargo Boeing 777F arriving at London Stansted Airport

Emirates SkyCargo is the cargo division of Emirates. It began operations in October 1985, the same year Emirates was formed, and launched its aircraft services in 2001 with a Boeing 747 Freighter. It serves 10 exclusive cargo destinations, besides others in common with the Emirates passenger network. During the 2020 pandemic, SkyCargo also began to operate 777-300ER and A380 passenger aircraft as preighters to expand their total cargo capacity. In 2022, Emirates ordered 5 more Boeing 777 freighters, up from their 11 at the time.

== Fleet ==
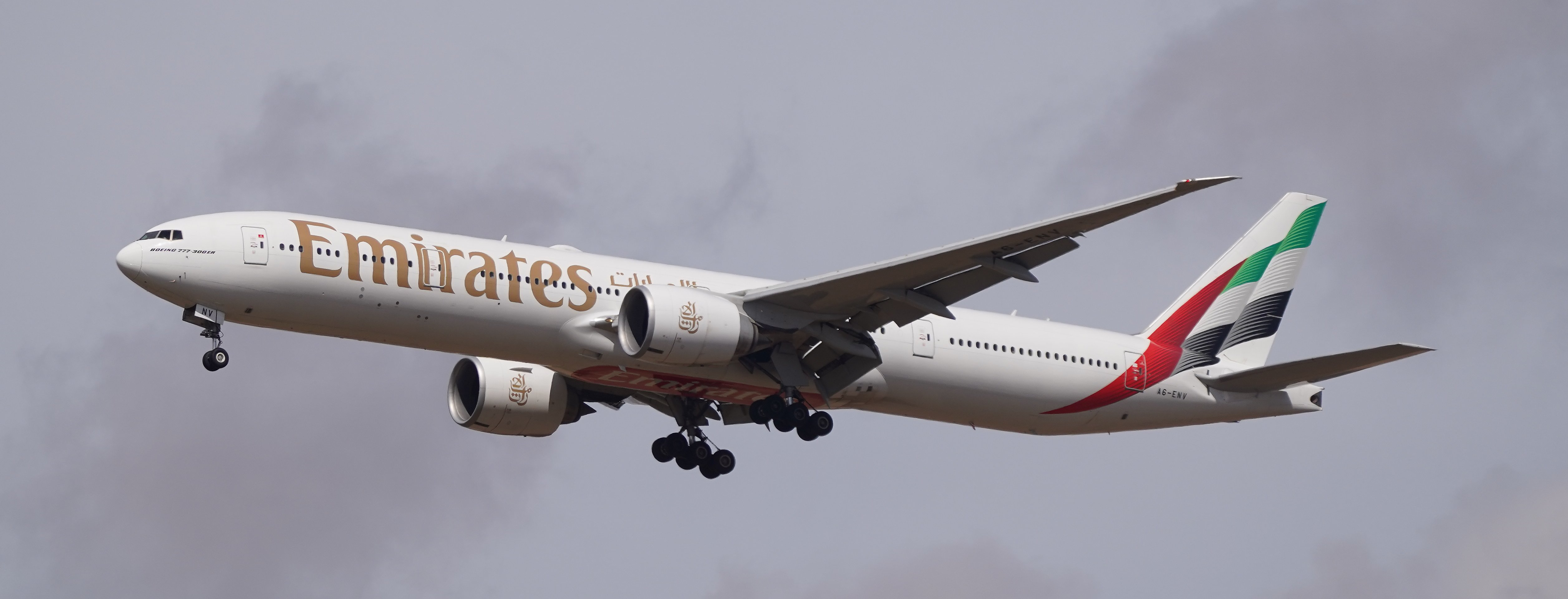
A Boeing 777-300ER at Stansted Airport

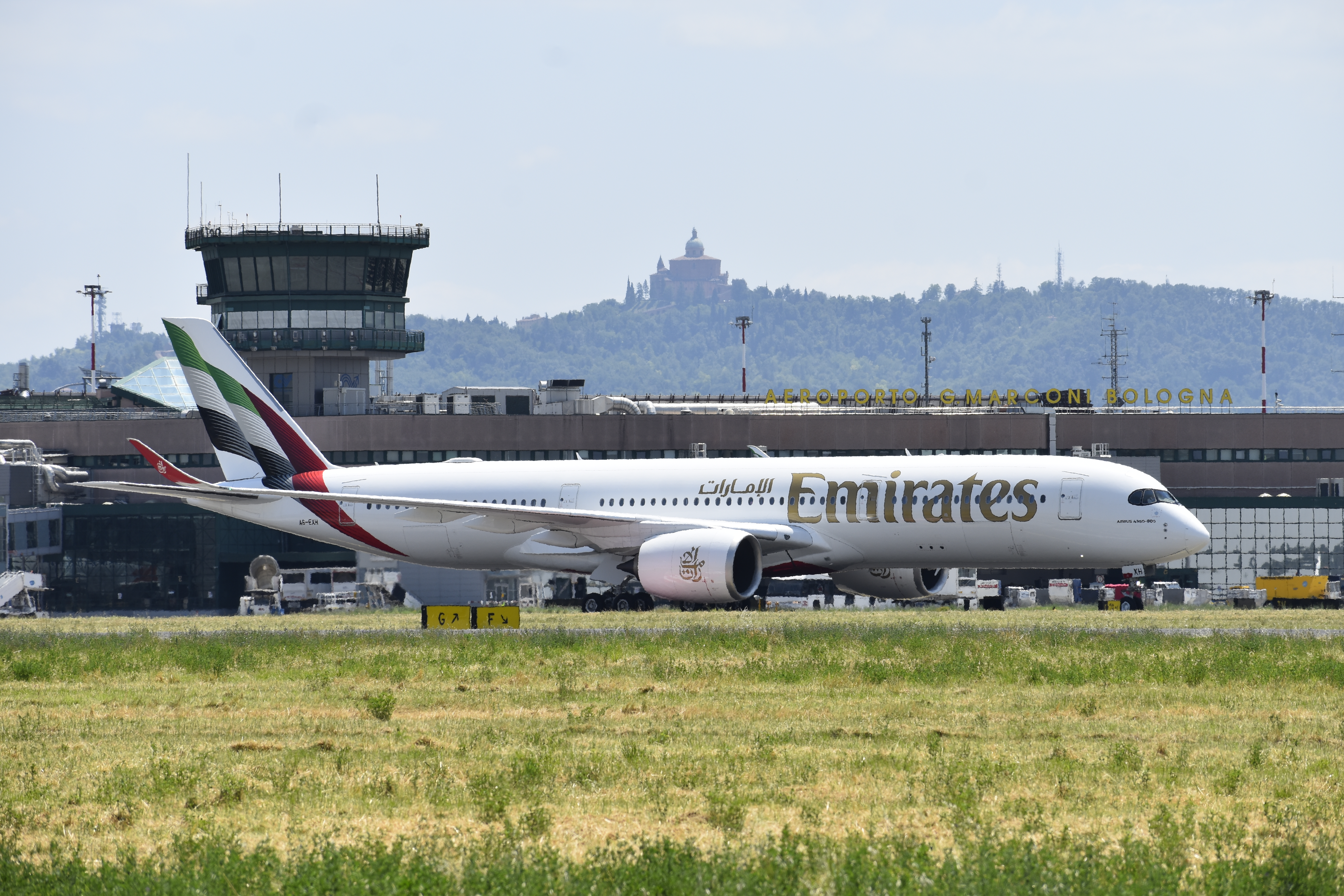
An Airbus A350 at Bologna Airport

As of June 2026, Emirates operates a fleet of 266 passenger aircraft and 24 cargo aircraft operated by Emirates SkyCargo. Emirates currently has 116 Airbus A380s and 127 Boeing 777s, including 10 777-200LRs and 117 777-300ERs, making them the largest operator of both types. The airline also has 23 Airbus A350-900s, and one Airbus A319 as an executive jet (this is painted in a plain white livery). Emirates has had no narrow-body aircraft in its mainline fleet since 1995.

In July 2014, Emirates finalized an order for 150 Boeing 777X aircraft, consisting of 35 777-8s and 115 777-9s, and was expected to become the launch operator for the 777X in mid 2020. In November 2017, it signed a commitment for 40 787-10s, but by early 2019, it was considering cancelling this order because engine margins were insufficient for the hot Dubai weather, in favour of the Airbus A350.

In February 2019, Emirates signed a memorandum of understanding with Airbus for 40 A330-900s and 30 A350-900s, while reducing its total A380 order to eight (with the last one to be delivered in 2022) after which Airbus planned to permanently cease production of the A380. Emirates received the final A380 (registration A6-EVS) built by Airbus on 16 December 2021. It was the 123rd A380 to join the fleet. The delivery officially marked the end of the Airbus A380 production 14 years after the first delivery to Singapore Airlines in 2007.

In November 2019, Emirates announced an order of 50 A350-900 aircraft worth US$16 billion that superseded the February memorandum of understanding. Also in November 2019, Emirates placed an order for 30 Boeing 787-9 Dreamliners for a value of US$8.8 billion, while reducing its order of 777Xs from 150 to 126.

In December 2019, Emirates clarified that 11 of its 777X orders were subject to reconfirmation, but the overall number of orders had not been reduced. Being the largest operator of the A380, Emirates maintains its fleet via the MRO subsidiary of Safran, OEMServices.

On 13 November 2023, at the Dubai Airshow, Emirates finalized an order of 90 777X aircraft worth US$52 billion, including 50 Boeing 777-9 aircraft and 35 Boeing 777-8 aircraft. This brings the total Boeing 777X backlog to 205 aircraft. Another 5 Boeing 787 Dreamliners were ordered, growing Emirates' 787 backlog to 35 – while converting 30 787-9s to 20 787-8 and 10 787-10 aircraft.

On 16 November 2023, also at the Dubai Airshow, Emirates ordered an additional 15 Airbus A350-900s worth US$6 billion, bringing the total of A350-900s ordered by Emirates to 65. The first A350-900 was delivered on 25 November 2024. A350 services began on 4 January 2025, with an inaugural flight to Edinburgh.

On 18 April 2025, it was announced that Emirates would be receiving Airbus A350-900 outfitted with seating for ultra long haul flights, capable of flying over 15 hours non-stop with a range of over 14,000 km (8,699 mi; 7,559 nmi). Adelaide will be the first city served, replacing the current Boeing 777-200LR aircraft serving the city.

On 19 November 2025, at the Dubai Airshow 2025, Emirates announced a top-up order for eight additional A350-900 aircraft worth US$3.4 billion, bringing the total Emirates A350-900 order to 73 with 13 already delivered at the time.

== Livery ==
=== First livery (1985–1999) ===
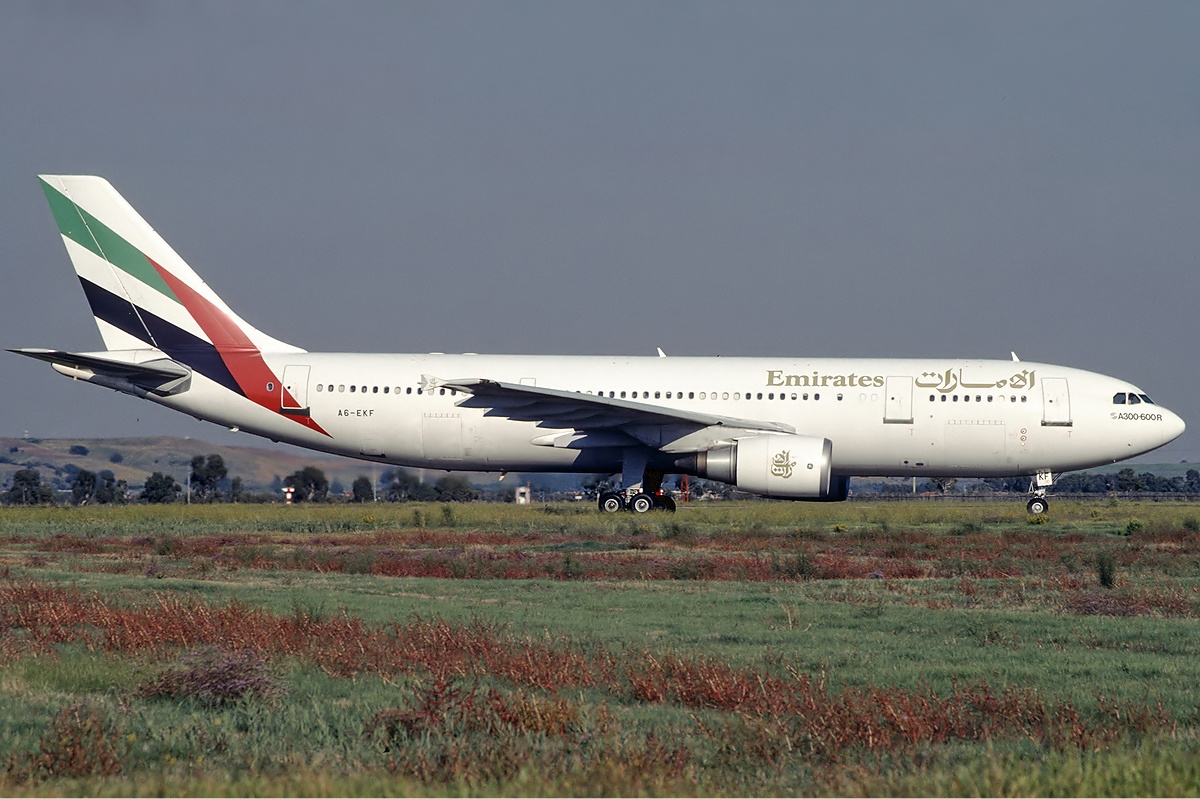
A now-retired Airbus A300-600R painted in the airline's first livery

The first livery of Emirates, created by Negus & Negus, was similar to the second livery, except that the company name "Emirates" was written in a different font; it was relatively smaller, located on the top of the windows; and it was followed by the company name in Arabic. All aircraft wearing the first-generation livery were either repainted or retired. This livery was retired by 2005 as the last aircraft with the first generation livery (an Airbus A310-300) was repainted to the second generation livery.

=== Second livery (1999–2023) ===
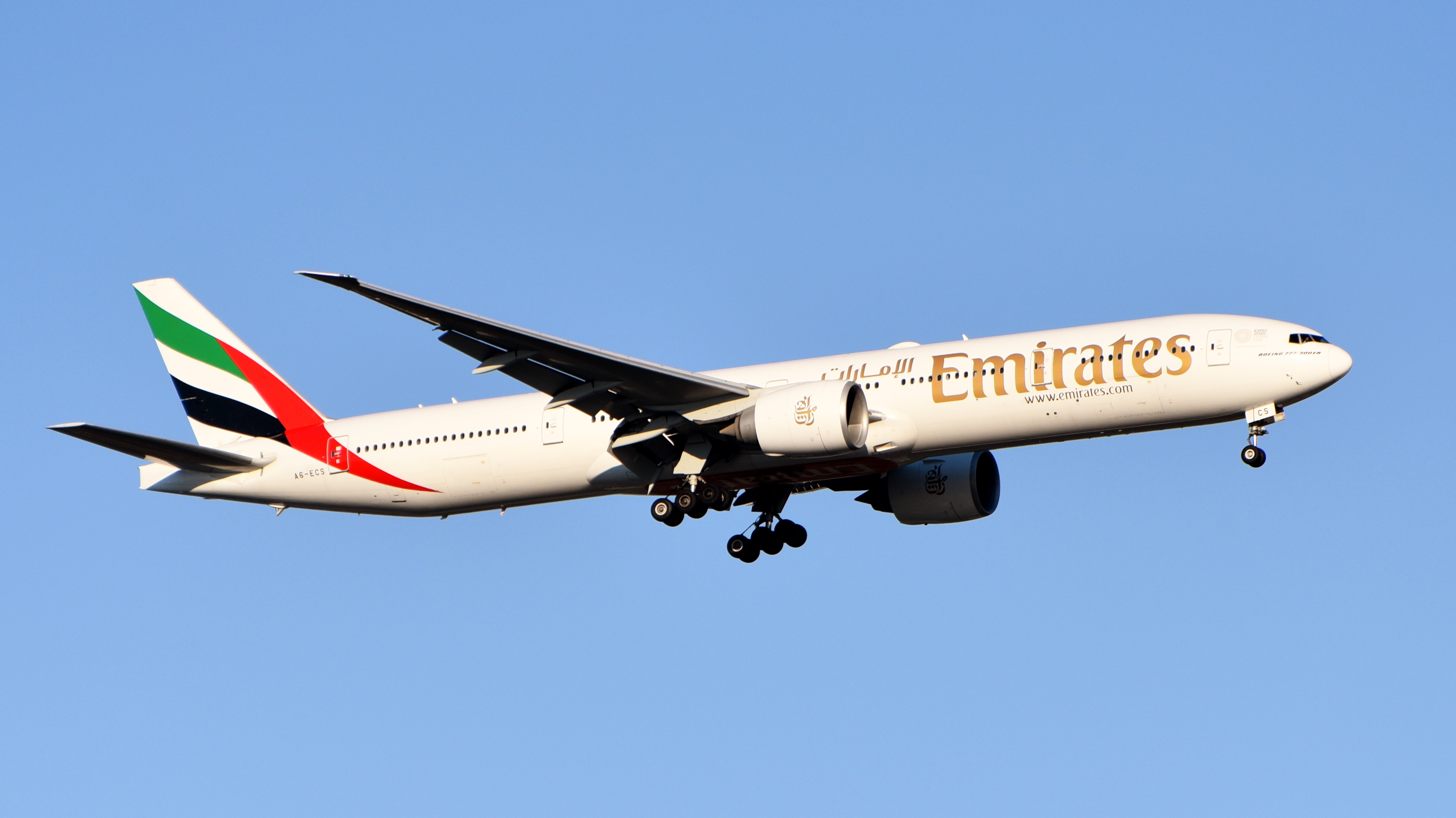
A Boeing 777-300ER painted in the airline's second livery

The second Emirates livery, which featured a UAE flag on the vertical stabilizer and a white fuselage, with the golden word "Emirates" painted on the upper fuselage, was introduced in November 1999 on the Boeing 777-300 and the Airbus A330-200, as well as all other aircraft that were delivered from November 1999 onward. The livery rolled out shortly after in 2000 on the rest of the Emirates fleet, and Emirates repainted all aircraft to this livery by 2005. The second Emirates livery also kept the Arabic company name, but the font size was smaller than the one from the first Emirates livery. The Emirates logo in Arabic is painted gold on all engines. The livery was updated in 2005 when the red word "Emirates" was introduced and painted on the belly of the fuselage.

=== Current livery (2023–present) ===
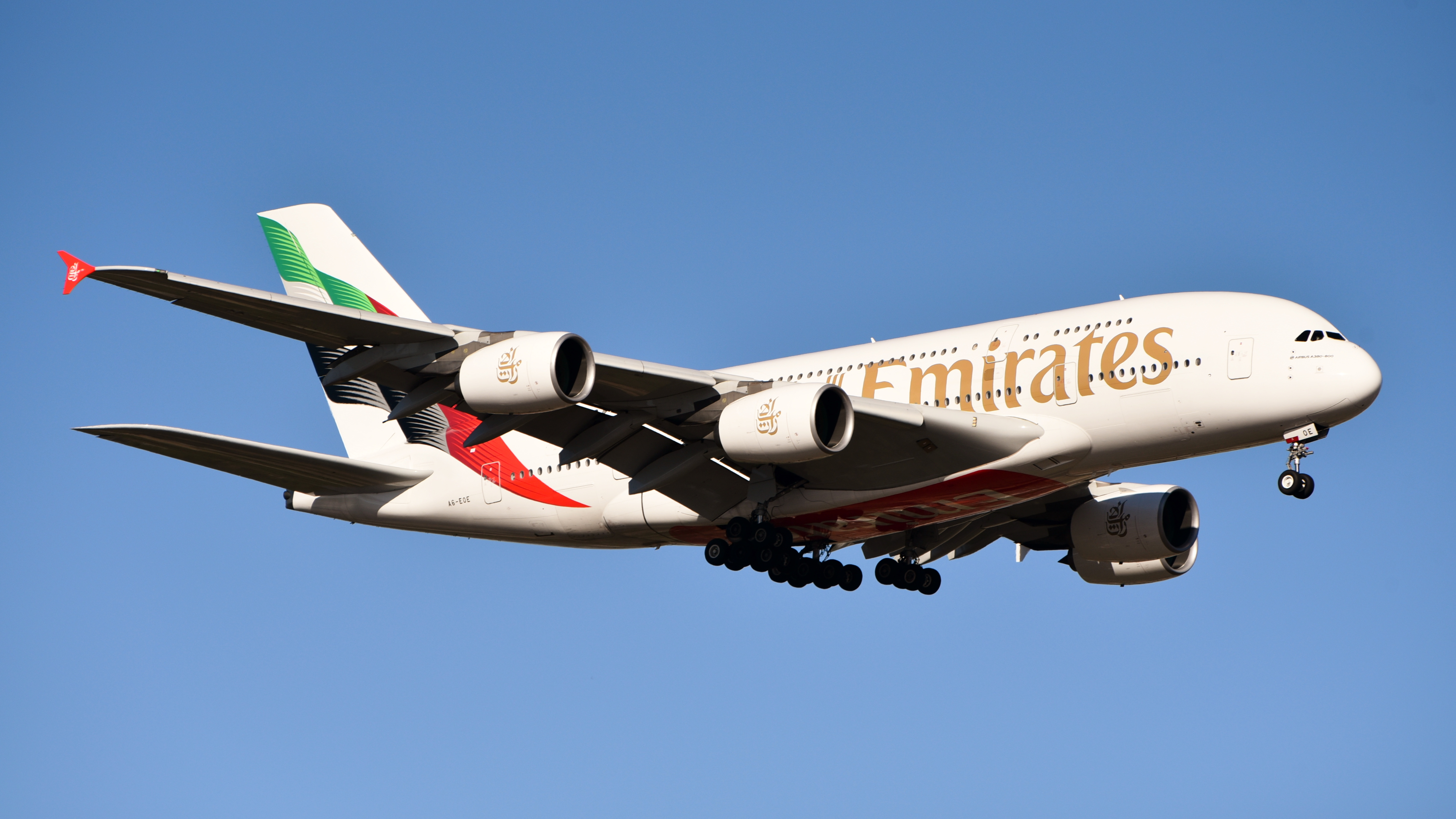
An Airbus A380 painted in the current livery

On 16 March 2023, Emirates revealed its new livery. The livery features a more dynamic, flowing design of the UAE flag on the tailfin with a 3D effect. The wingtips are now painted red, displaying the Emirates logo in white Arabic calligraphy. Passengers with window seats can see the UAE flag colors painted on the inside of the wingtips, facing the fuselage.

The airline's Airbus A350s also include the updated UAE flag on the inner side of the winglets.

== Services ==
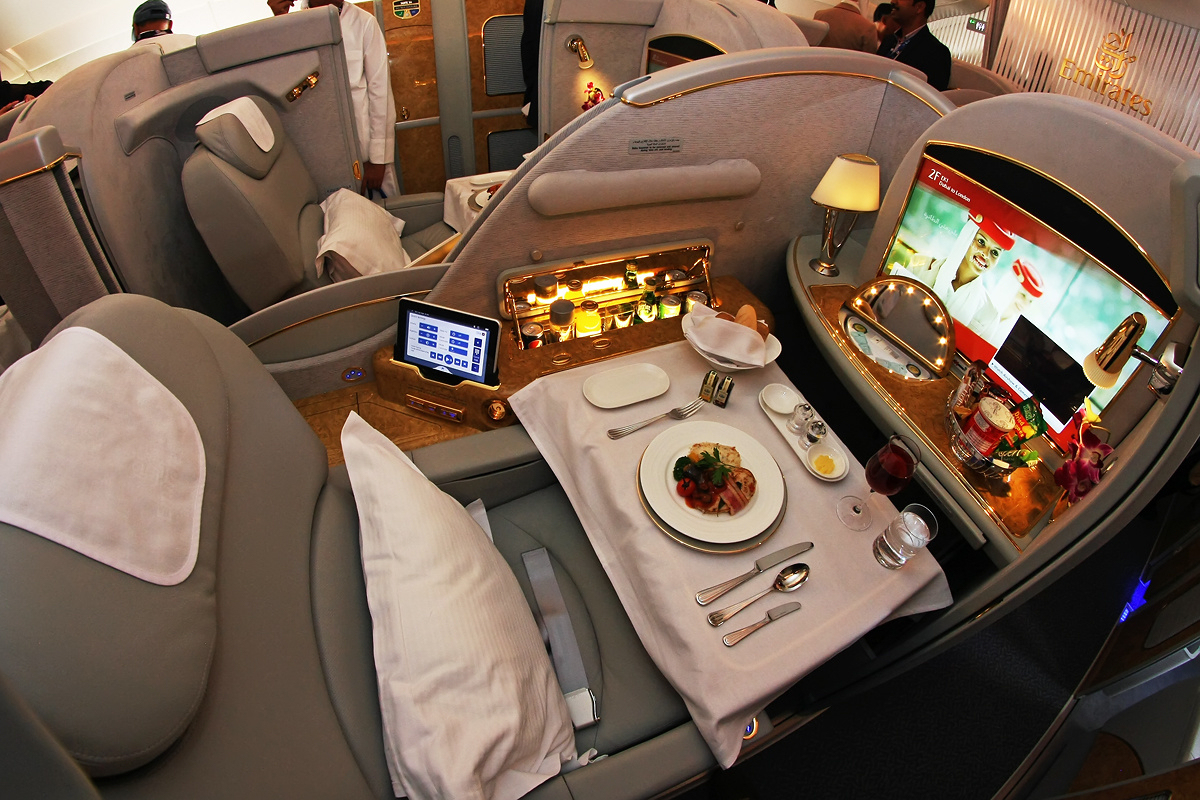
Old First class private suites on an Emirates A380

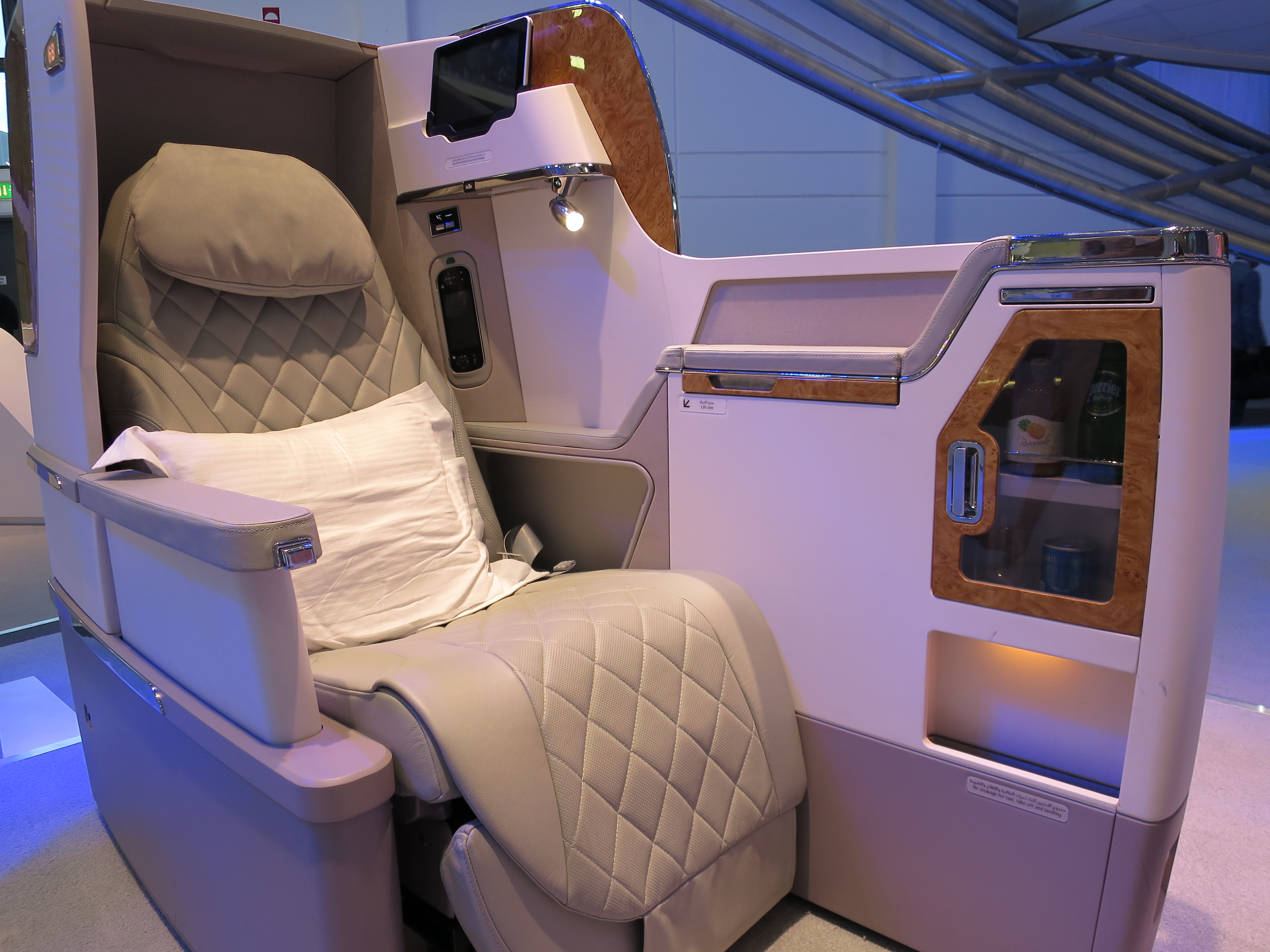
Emirates' new business class seat on Boeing 777

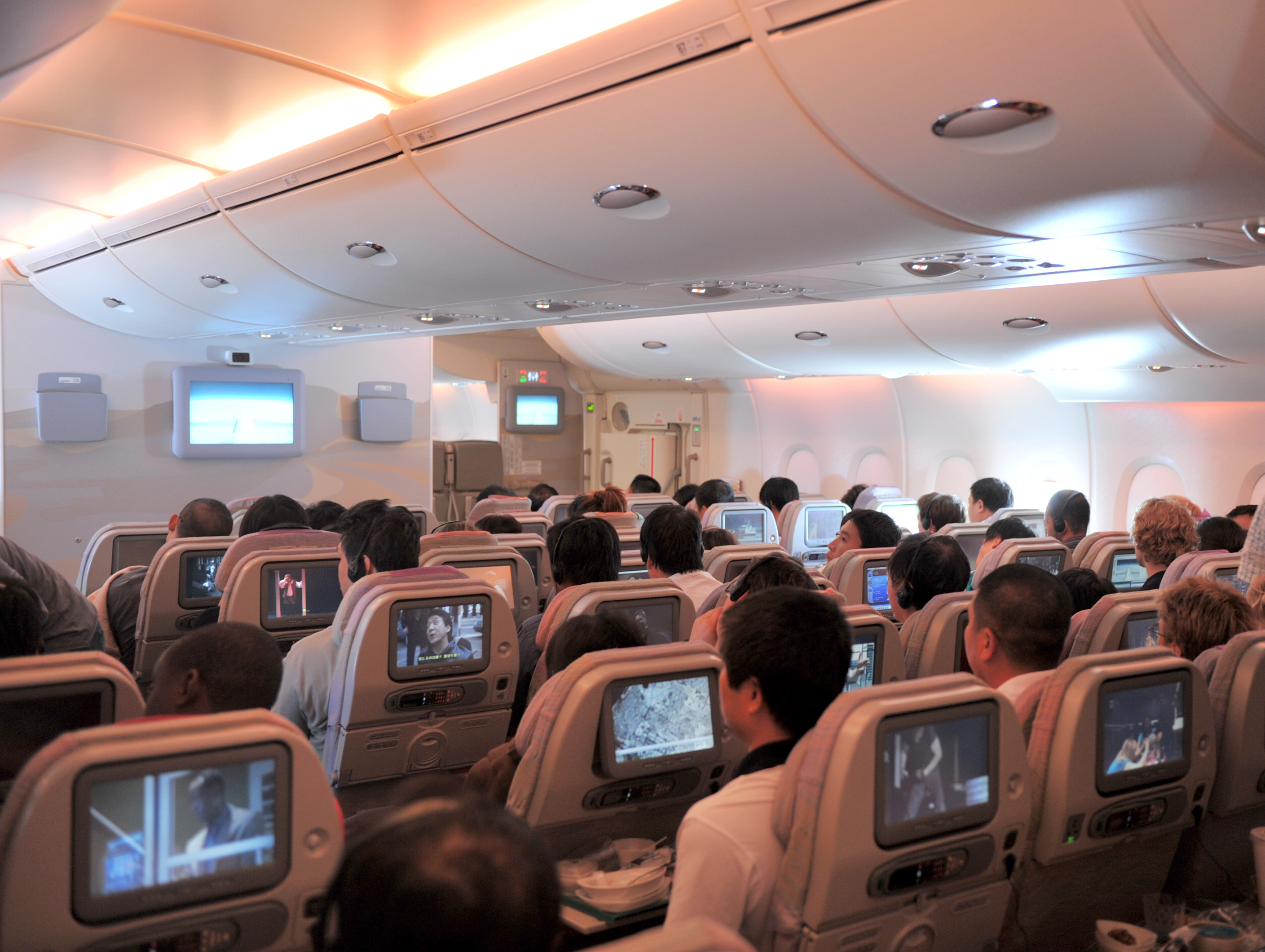
Emirates' old 10-abreast economy class cabin

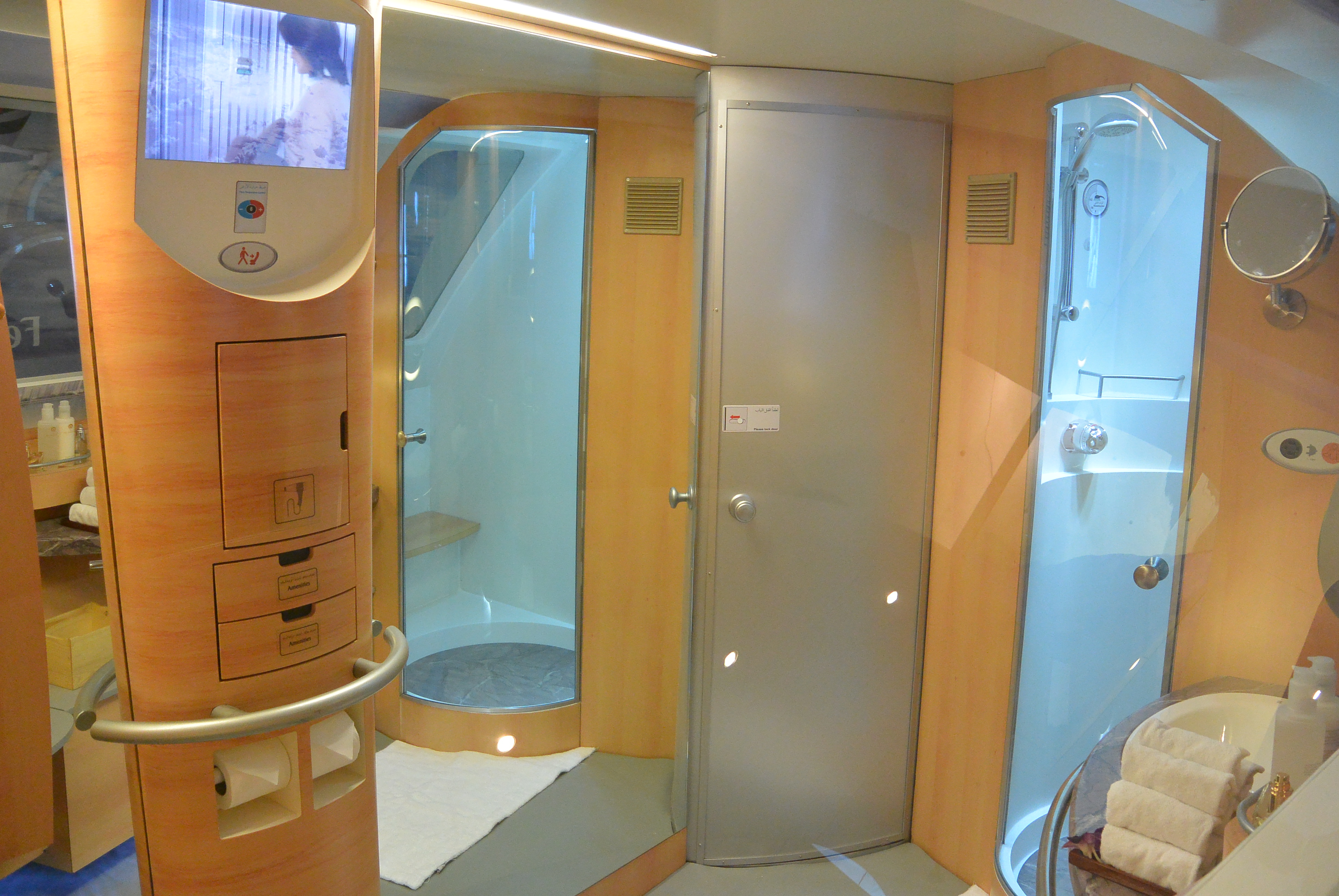
The old shower spa on an Emirates A380, available to first class passengers only

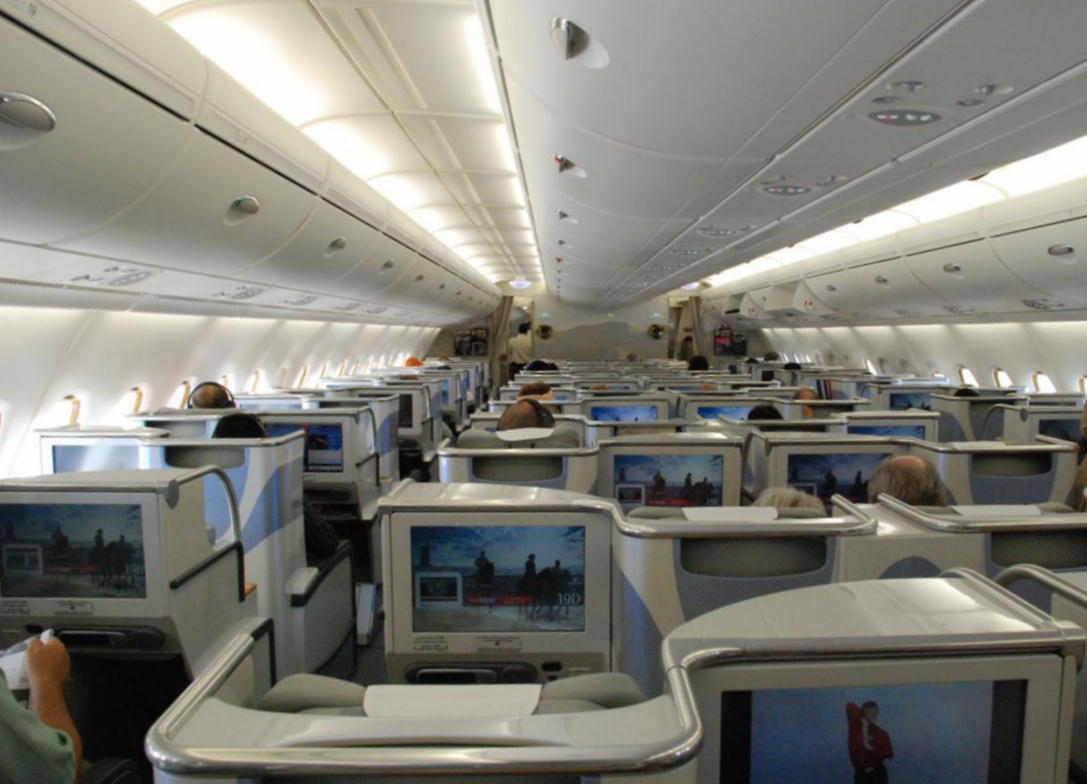
Emirates' old business class cabin

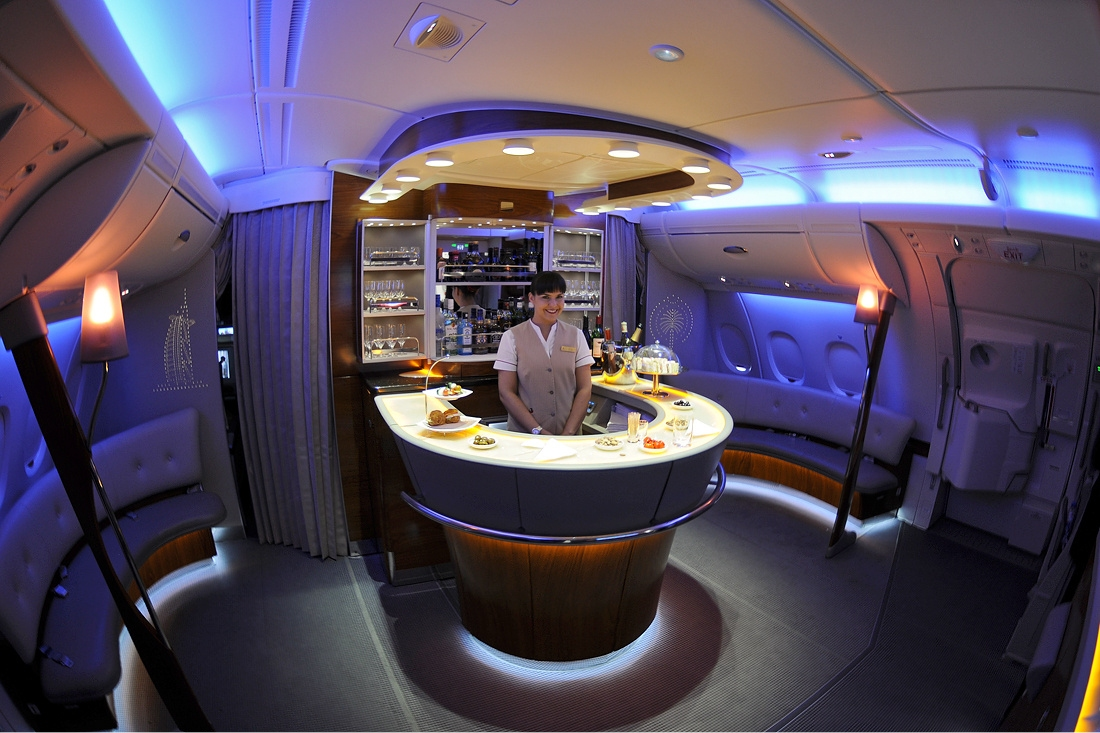
The old on-board bar on one of Emirates' A380s

=== Cabin ===
==== First class ====
The two types of first class seating are the fully enclosed suite with a floor-to-ceiling door and a private suite with doors that close but do not extend to the ceiling. Both suites come complete with closing doors to ensure privacy, a minibar, a coat rack, and storage. They also feature the ICE in-flight entertainment system on a 23-inch-wide (58 cm) LCD screen in the private suites and a 32-inch-wide (81 cm) on the fully enclosed suite. The seat converts into a 2-metre-long (79 in) fully flat bed. Private suites are available on three-class and four-class Airbus A380-800 and three-class Boeing 777-300ER aircraft. The fully enclosed suites are available only on newly delivered Boeing 777-300ER aircraft.

On its newly delivered Airbus A380-800, first class features private suites, two shower-equipped lavatories and a spa, and access to the first/business class bar area and lounge. Premium class seating is located on the entire upper deck of the aircraft.

Emirates introduced a new first-class cabin for its Boeing 777-300ER fleet on 12 November 2017 and first flights to Brussels and Geneva on 1 December 2017. The new first-class cabin is configured with six suites on a 1-1-1 layout. Both of the middle suites are equipped with three virtual windows, which are high-definition LCD screens that relay real-time images using HD cameras on either side of the aircraft. Amenities include two minibars placed on either side of the entertainment screen, a 13-inch tablet with a front camera to communicate with the cabin crew and to order room service, and a panel to control the lighting and temperature inside the suite. Emirates has also introduced a new seat in collaboration with Mercedes-Benz, which features a new zero-gravity position. The suites are expected to resemble "a private bedroom on a luxury yacht".

==== Business class ====
Business class on Boeing 777-200LRs and Boeing 777-300ERs feature seats with a 1.5-metre-long (60 in) pitch that reclines to 2-metre-long (79 in), angled lie-flat beds. Amenities include a massage function, privacy partition, winged headrest with six-way movement, two individual reading lights, and an overhead light per seat; in-seat power supply, USB ports, and an RCA socket for laptop connection; and over 600 channels of entertainment on the ICE system, shown on a 23 in-wide (58 cm) HD TV screen.

On Airbus A380-800 aircraft, the seats recline to form a fully flat bed and are equipped with personal minibars. The unique staggered layout makes half of the business-class seats on Emirates A380 23 cm (9 in) shorter than the others, at only 1.8 m (70 in) long. Business class passengers also have access to an on-board bar at the rear of the aircraft.

==== Premium economy class ====
In December 2020, it was announced that Emirates' new Premium economy cabin would be equipped with Recaro PL3530 seats which were designed exclusively for the airline.

The seats offer a pitch of up to 40 inches (100 cm), a recline of 8 inches (20 cm) and measure 19.5 inches (50 cm) wide. All seats are equipped with a 13.3-inch (34 cm) entertainment screen using the Emirates ICE system.

Currently, 24 Airbus A380 aircraft in the Emirates fleet have the new premium economy class cabin. These seats are also set to be retrofitted on the airline's older Boeing 777-300ERs and Airbus A380s as part of a retrofit program of US$2 billion that began at the end of 2022; by the end of the program, 67 Airbus A380s and 53 Boeing 777s will be fitted with premium economy.

==== Economy class ====
Emirates economy class offers a 79–81-centimetre-long (31–32 in) seat pitch on Airbus aircraft and 86 cm (34 in) on Boeing aircraft, with standard seat width (except on the Boeing 777 fleet). Emirates has 10 seats per row on its Boeing 777 fleet. The seat features adjustable headrests, a 3000-channel ICE system, and in-seat laptop power outlets on newer aircraft and laptop recharging facilities in galleys in older aircraft. Additional recline is available on A380 economy-class seats.

Emirates became the launch customer for Safran's U-Dream eight-way adjustable headrests, installing the system on its Z400 economy class seats. The system first entered service across three of the airline's Airbus A350-900 aircraft, with full deployment across the remaining A350 fleet expected by late 2026. Emirates plans to extend the cabin upgrade to its retrofitted Airbus A380 and Boeing 777 aircraft starting in 2027.

=== Catering ===
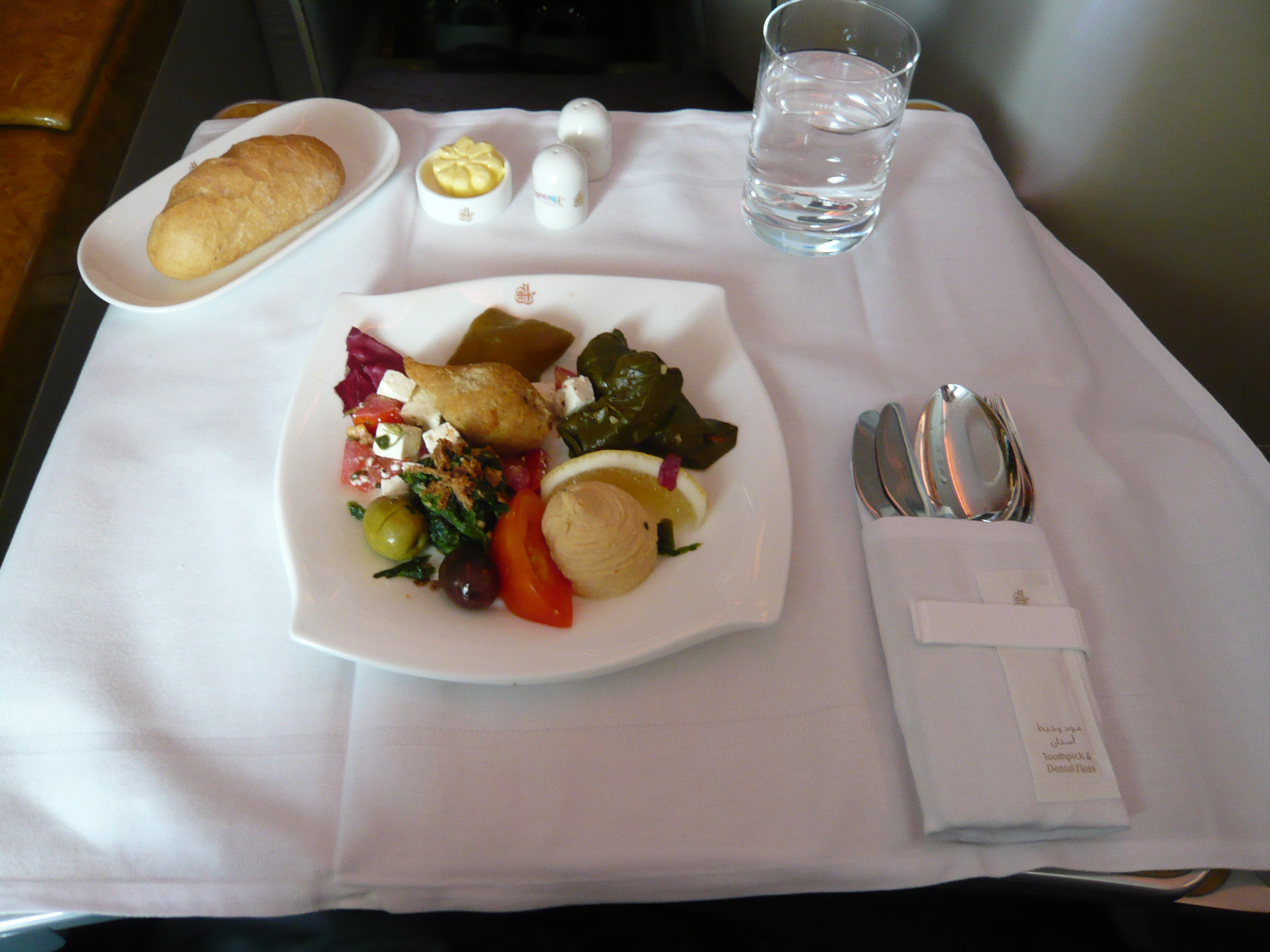
An appetizer served in business class on Emirates

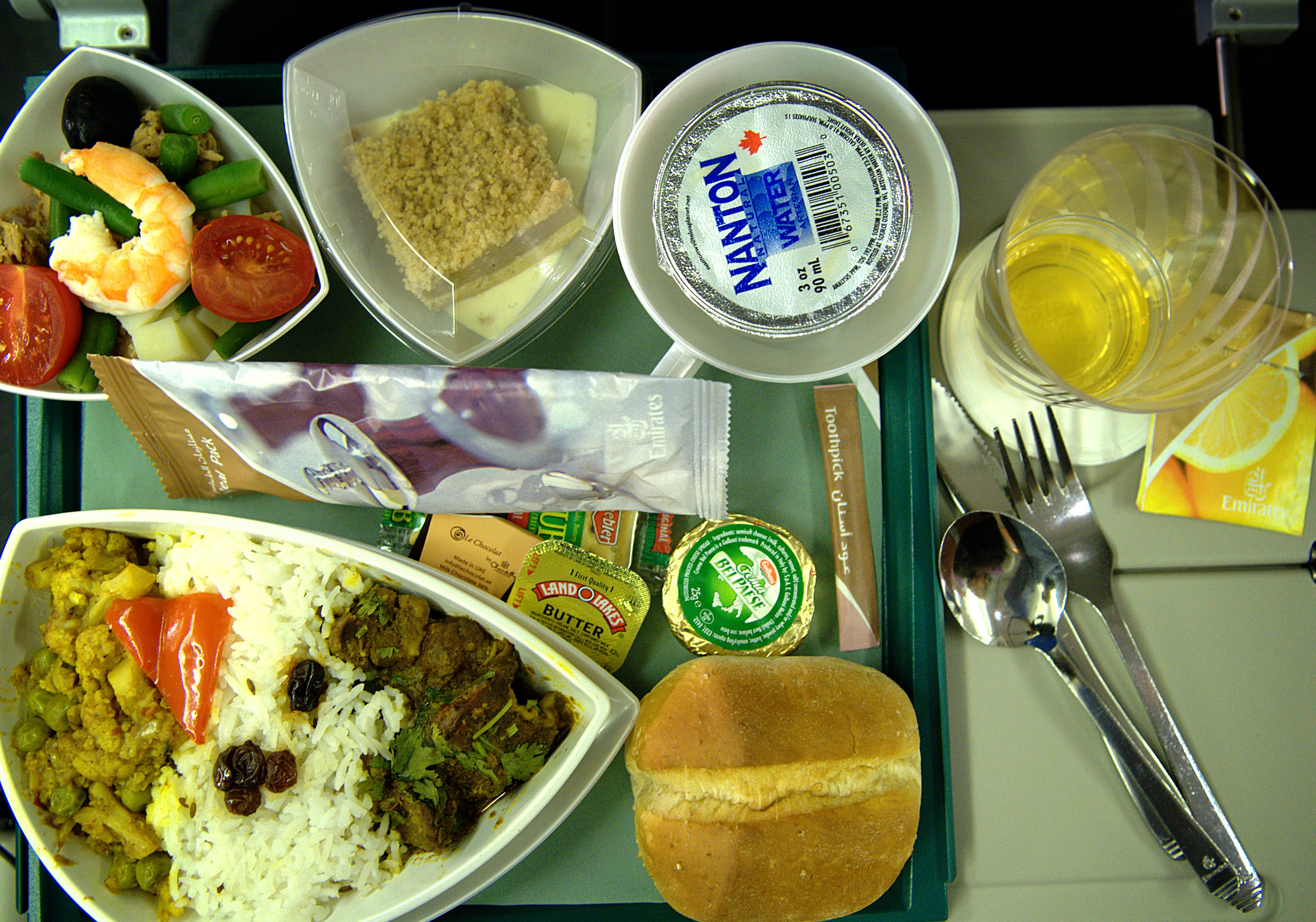
An on-board meal served in economy class

Catering on Emirates flights from Dubai International is provided by Emirates Flight Catering, which operates one of the largest airline catering facilities in the world. Emirates also offers special meal options, in all classes, based on age, dietary restrictions and preference, and religious observance. Special meals must be ordered in advance at least 24 hours before the flight departure time. All meals are prepared according to Halal dietary guidelines. In June 2018, Emirates signed a $40 million joint venture with Oakland-based Crop One Holdings, to build and maintain the world's largest hydroponic growing facility. It would provide daily yields of roughly 3 tons of leafy greens per day to all flights, with a near 150,000-square-foot (14,000 m^{2}) indoor, vertical farm.

=== In-flight entertainment system (IFE) ===
Emirates became one of the first airlines in the world to introduce a personal entertainment system on commercial aircraft in 1992, with Virgin Atlantic introducing a similar system throughout all cabins of its aircraft. All three classes feature a personal IFE system in the Emirates aircraft. There are two types of entertainment systems in Emirates: ICE and ICE Digital Widescreen.

In 2012, Emirates introduced larger high-definition IFE screens in all classes. The new IFE is the first to be fully high definition, and in economy, the screens are the largest offered by any airline. The new IFE will only be installed on the Airbus A380 fleet and the newly delivered Boeing 777s.

==== In-flight entertainment system (ICE) ====
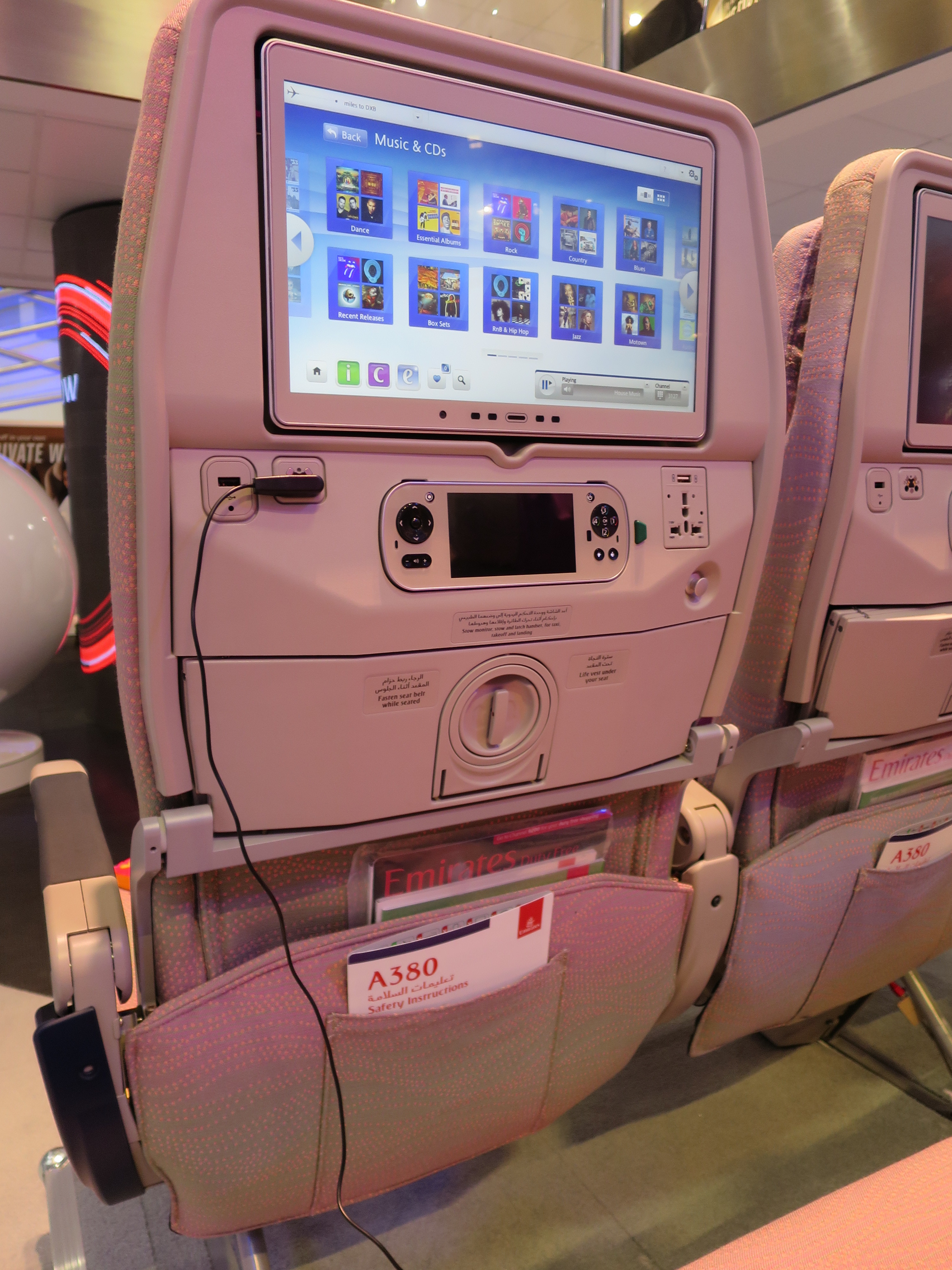
An Emirates economy class seat equipped with the ICE (information, communication, entertainment) in-flight entertainment system

ICE (information, communication, entertainment) is the In-Flight Entertainment (IFE) system operated by Emirates.

Introduced in 2003, ICE is available on all new aircraft and now features 4,000 channels (on most flights) for all passengers. ICE is found on the airline's Airbus A350-900, Airbus A380-800, Boeing 777-200LR, and Boeing 777-300ER.

In July 2007, Emirates introduced ICE Digital Widescreen, an updated version of ICE. It offered over 1200 channels of selected entertainment to all passengers. ICE Digital Widescreen is available on all Emirates aircraft.

In 2015, Emirates upgraded ICE to the new eX3 version, which included new upgrades that improved the passenger experience, such as a handset with more controls, larger screens, new sockets, some 3,500 channels of movies, TV shows, music, and games on-demand and in multiple languages, new ICE features, such as a Voyager app, Bluetooth audio, and personal video playback. This is fitted on all B777 and A380 aircraft delivered after 2009. The redesigned version, based on Thales's AVANT Up, was introduced in 2025 with its first A350 delivery.

According to Emirates, ICE has received more awards than any other airline in the world for inflight entertainment.

===== Information =====
The system is based on the 3000i system from Panasonic Avionics Corporation. ICE provides passengers with a direct data link to BBC News. ICE is the first IFE system to be connected directly to automatic news updates. This is complemented by ICE's Airshow moving-map software from Rockwell Collins. Exterior cameras located on the aircraft can be viewed by any passenger through the IFE system during takeoff, cruise, and landing. Emirates was also one of the first airlines to introduce a high-speed, in-flight internet service along with Singapore Airlines, by installing the Inmarsat's satellite system and became the second airline in the world to offer live international television broadcasts using the same system.

===== Communication =====
ICE has a link to an in-flight email server, which allows passengers to access, send, or receive emails for US$1 per message. ICE also supports a seat-to-seat chat service. In November 2006, the airline signed a deal with mobile communications firm AeroMobile to allow in-flight use of mobile phones to call or text people on the ground. The service was first introduced in March 2008.

===== Entertainment =====
The ICE system includes movies, music, and video games. ICE offers over 600 on-demand movie titles, over 2000 video on demand and prerecorded television channels, over 1000 hours of music, and over 100 video game titles. ICE can be accessed in more than 40 languages, including English, French, German, Russian, Spanish, Arabic, Chinese, Hindi, Urdu, Persian, Korean, Tamil, Thai, Dutch, Swedish, Italian, and Japanese. Since 2003, all entertainment options are available on demand to all classes with options to pause, forward, and rewind them.

Emirates began to offer docking capability for Apple Inc.'s iPod portable music and video player in mid 2007. This enabled the device's battery to be charged and integrated with ICE, which could then play music, television shows, or movies stored on the iPod and function as a control system. This feature was removed from Emirates aircraft starting in the late 2010s due to the iPod being discontinued.

== Business model ==
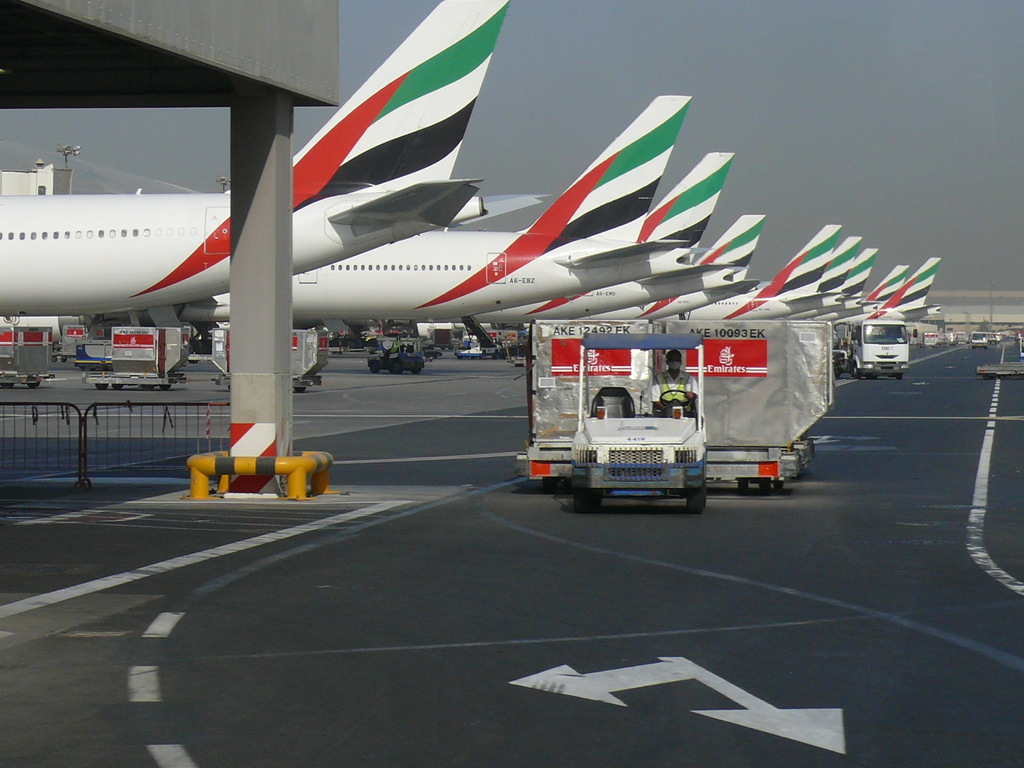
Emirates aircraft parked at Dubai International Airport

Established network carriers in Europe and Australia, such as Air France-KLM, British Airways, Lufthansa, and Qantas, see Emirates' strategic decision to reposition itself as a global carrier as a major threat because it enables travelers to bypass traditional airline hubs such as London-Heathrow, Paris-CDG, and Frankfurt on their way between Europe/North America and Asia/Australia by changing flights in Dubai instead. These carriers also find it difficult to deal with the growing competitive threat Emirates poses to their business because of their much higher cost base. Some of these carriers, notably Air France and Qantas, have accused Emirates of receiving hidden state subsidies and maintaining too close of a relationship with Dubai's airport authority and its aviation authority, both of which are also wholly state-owned entities that share the same government owner with the airline. Qantas' chairman claimed that Emirates can reduce its borrowing costs below market rates by taking advantage of its government shareholders' sovereign borrower status. Emirates' president disagrees and has also referred to United States airlines bankruptcy protection as being a tangible form of state assistance. The airline makes regular profits. In 2016, American Airlines, Delta Air Lines, and United Airlines made similar claims, as well as stating that Emirates violates Open Skies, but these conflicts were resolved in May 2018.

In May 2010, Emirates executives denied claims that the carrier does not pay taxes and receives substantial financial assistance from the Dubai government. They claimed that the airline received $80m in cash in the 25 years since the airline was established and this was substantially lower than what other national carriers had received. Maurice Flanagan also claimed that Emirates incurred social costs of around $600m in 2009, and this included municipal taxes to the city of Dubai. The airline also paid a dividend of AED 956m (US$260m) in 2010, compared to AED2.9bn ($793m) in 2009, and each year the Government has received at least $100m in dividends. Emirates also faces competition from other Middle Eastern airlines, mainly Qatar Airways and Abu Dhabi–based Etihad Airways.

== Sustainability ==
In its efforts to reduce carbon emissions, the Emirates started exploring the use of sustainable aviation fuel (SAF) for its fleet since 2017. The airline has partnered with the world's leading biodiesel producers such as Neste, a Finnish producer of sustainable aviation fuel, as well as Shell Aviation. In January 2023, the airline conducted a successful demonstration flight of a Boeing 777-300ER using 100 percent SAF in one of its two engines. In November of the same year, Emirates conducted another demonstration flight of an Airbus A380 using 100 percent SAF in one of the airplane's four engines. Following successful tests, Emirates operated its first commercial flight using SAF blend on 24 October 2023, on Emirates flight EK 412 from Dubai to Sydney, Australia using an Airbus A380.

Currently, the airline has suppliers set up to supply its flights with SAF in several airports around the world including Paris, Lyon, Oslo, Amsterdam, London, Singapore and its home base in Dubai.

== Accidents and incidents ==
Since commencing operations in 1985, Emirates has recorded six aircraft accidents and incidents. Two resulted in ground fatalities: the 2016 crash of Flight EK521 at Dubai International Airport, in which a firefighter was killed, and the 2025 crash of Emirates SkyCargo Flight 9788 at Hong Kong International Airport, in which two airport security staff were killed. No passengers or crew have died in an Emirates accident:

- On 9 April 2004, Emirates Flight 764, an Airbus A340-300 operating from Johannesburg to Dubai, sustained serious damage during takeoff when it overran runway 03L, striking runway 21R approach lights, causing four tires to burst, which threw debris into various parts of the aircraft, ultimately damaging the flap drive mechanism. This rendered the flaps immovable in the takeoff position. The aircraft returned for an emergency landing during which the normal braking system failed as a result of the damage. The aircraft was brought to a stop only 250 m (820 ft) from the end of the 3,400-metre (11,200 ft) runway using reverse thrust and the alternative braking system. In their report, South African investigators found that the captain had used a wrong take-off technique, and criticized Emirates' training and rostering practices.
- On 20 March 2009, Emirates Flight 407, an Airbus A340-500 registered A6-ERG en route from Melbourne to Dubai, failed to take off properly at Melbourne Airport, hitting several structures at the end of the runway before eventually climbing enough to return to the airport for a safe landing. There were no injuries, but the incident was severe enough to be classified as an accident by the Australian Transport Safety Bureau.
- On 3 August 2016, Emirates Flight 521, a Boeing 777-300 registered A6-EMW and arriving from Trivandrum International Airport crash-landed and caught fire at Dubai International Airport at 12:44 pm local time. All 282 passengers and 18 crew on board survived the impact with 32 injuries (4 seriously) reported. However, an airport firefighter died fighting the blaze. The aircraft was destroyed by the fire. Flight 521 was the first hull loss in the history of Emirates.
- On 27 March 2024, an Airbus A380 suffered serious damage after it was hit by an emergency vehicle on the tarmac of Moscow Domodedovo International Airport.
- On 20 May 2024, Emirates Flight 508, a Boeing 777-300ER, suffered a bird strike before landing at Mumbai. While there were no injuries among passengers and crew, the plane suffered substantial damage and at least 36 flamingos were killed in the strike while the plane was flying over the Ghatkopar suburban region of Mumbai. An alternative aircraft was arranged for the return flight, and the plane was later repaired and put back into service.
- On 20 October 2025, Emirates SkyCargo Flight 9788 operated by Air ACT suffered a runway excursion at Hong Kong International Airport, which then led to a collision with a ground vehicle. All 4 onboard the plane survived. 2 people on the ground were killed.

== Controversies ==
Emirates has received criticism for their treatment of staff, which Emirates has disputed and is declining year over year. On 23 September 2016, an Italian man sued the airline after being squashed by an obese man for 9 hours. In 2019, an Australian woman filed an unsuccessful lawsuit against Emirates for not providing her water, leading her to collapse during a long-haul flight.

In August 2022, Emirates suspended its flights to Nigeria after it got into a dispute with the government of Nigeria over the repatriation of an undisclosed amount of money from the country. The dispute has since been resolved and in June 2024, the airline resumed its regular flights to the West African nation. Emirates has been sued twice in 2023 for deceptive advertising, once by a New Zealand male passenger and again two months later by a British energy trader. The New Zealand case was awarded in favor of the passenger, and the British case is ongoing.

In August 2023, a Pakistani man sued Emirates for PKR 5,000,000 claiming that the airline's service was extremely poor and below international standards. On 13 June 2024, the United States government fined Emirates for $1.8 million for operating flights carrying JetBlue Airways' designator code below 32,000 feet (9,800 m) over prohibited airspace in Iraq. On 25 November 2024, a Ghanaian businessman, Djanie Kotey filed a lawsuit against Emirates, but was dismissed. On 6 December 2024, Emirates was sued by TAF Africas CEO Jake Epelle for NGN 150 million over human rights violations.

On the evening 22 July 2026, the flight number EK302 using Airbus A380 aircraft from Dubai International Airport to Pudong Airport due to bad weather, the flight was forced to be diverted to Hangzhou Xiaoshan International Airport and landed at 9 pm. All 373 passengers on board were trapped for more than 12 hours and unable to leave due to customs. Due to AC on board malfunctions, the cabin became stuffy and hot and some of them had fainted but they were unable to get off despite two ambulances being ready. By around 9 am on 23 July 2026, all 373 passengers had gradually left the aircraft. After that, the flight was officially cancelled..

Emirates is one of the few foreign airlines still serving Russia after major carriers pulled out of the country amid sweeping sanctions over the Ukraine war, leading to criticism as a result.

== See also ==
- Etihad Airways
- Dubai International Airport
- Emirates Flight Training Academy
- List of airlines of the United Arab Emirates
- List of airports in the United Arab Emirates
