= Buhasa Airport =

- IATA: none; ICAO: OMAB

Summary
- Airport type: Private
- Owner: Abu Dhabi Company for Onshore Oil Operations
- Operator: Abu Dhabi Company for Onshore Oil Operations
- Location: Buhasa, UAE
- Time zone: UAE Standard Time (UTC+04:00)
- Elevation AMSL: 395 ft / 120 m
- Coordinates: 23°35′59″N 053°22′46″E

Map
- Location in the UAE

Runways
Direction	Length		Surface
Direction	m	ft	Surface
15/33	610	2,001	Tarmac
- Sources: UAE AIP

Buhasa Airport (ICAO: OMAB) was a small private airfield operated by the Abu Dhabi Company for Onshore Oil Operations and served the oil field at Buhasa, Abu Dhabi, UAE.
