= Arzanah Airport =

- IATA: none; ICAO: OMAR

Summary
- Airport type: Private
- Operator: Zakum Development Company
- Location: Arzanah, UAE
- Time zone: UAE Standard Time (UTC+04:00)
- Elevation AMSL: 15 ft / 5 m
- Coordinates: 24°46′51″N 052°33′35″E

Map
- Location in the UAE OMAR (Persian Gulf) OMAR (Indian Ocean) OMAR (Middle East) OMAR (West and Central Asia) OMAR (Asia)

Runways
Direction	Length		Surface
Direction	m	ft	Surface
13/31	1,048	3,438	Tarmac
- Sources: UAE AIP

Arzanah Airport (ICAO: OMAR) is a small private airfield operated by the Zakum Development Company and serves the oil field at Arzanah, Abu Dhabi, UAE.
