= Emirates Flight Training Academy =

- Dubai South; United Arab Emirates

Information
- Type: Aviation school
- Opened: 2017

Emirates Flight Training Academy (EFTA; Arabic: أكاديمية الإمارات لتدريب الطيّارين), is a pilot-training school based in the United Arab Emirates. Founded in 2017, it is a subsidiary of multinational aviation corporation, The Emirates Group, and its airline division, Emirates.

== History ==
The school was officially opened in 2017 during Dubai Airshow and started with a fleet of six training aircraft. Plans include for a total fleet of 27 aircraft: 22 Cirrus SR22s and five Embraer Phenom 100s.

With its own private airport and campus, the school is located at the edge of Dubai World Central Airport, and will act as the dedicated training center for the country's National Cadet Pilot Programme as well as international students. In 2017, the school signed an agreement with American aircraft manufacturer Boeing for collaboration on training curriculum for managing cadet learning and training flight operations.

== The Program ==
Trainees at the Flight Training Academy undergo pilot training as a first step in a ground training program to obtain an Airline Pilot License (ATPL), and are given English language lessons if required. They then train in the air on the sixth-generation Cirrus SR22 and then Embraer Phenom 100EV jets. This approach differs from the traditional approach followed by most flight schools, where students first train on single-engine light aircraft and then on twin-engine light aircraft. The Academy’s approved approach eliminates the additional step required for training beginners and provides them with more experience in the field of jet aircraft. Students ultimately obtain a Commercial Pilot License for multi-engine aircraft with a specific model, and then an Airline Pilot License. The program generally takes three and a half years if English language lessons are included, and 21 months, if these lessons are not required.

== Awards ==
- The Aviation Business Middle East Awards 2022 award recognizes a training provider or aviation training academy that offers industry-leading courses.

== See also ==
- Emirates Aviation University
