= Emirates Aviation University =

Education organization in Dubai, United Arab Emirates

- جامعة الإمارات للطيران
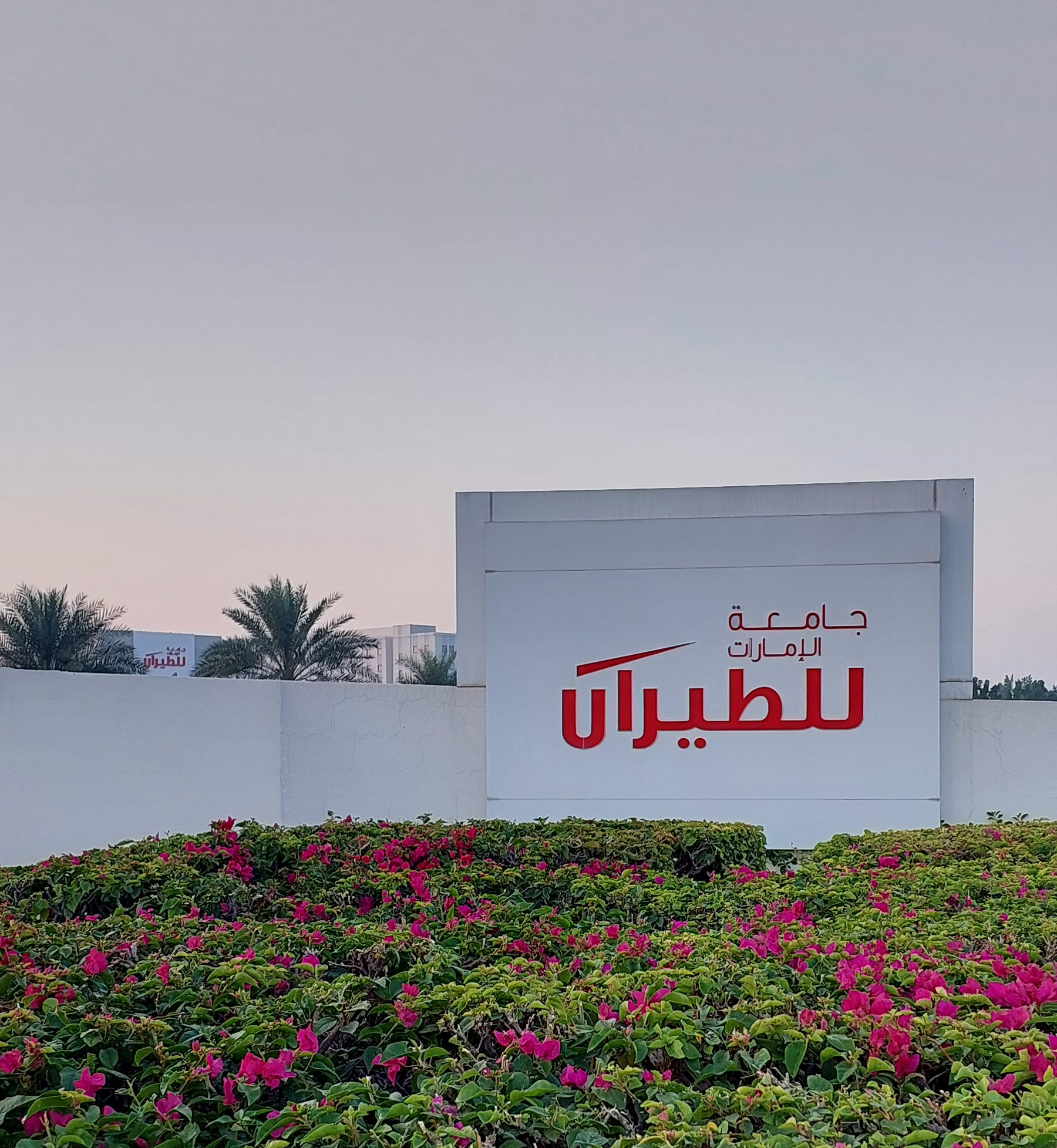
- Other name: Emirates Aviation College
- Established: 1991
- Parent institution: The Emirates Group
- Location: Dubai, United Arab Emirates; 25.1136°N 55.4118°E
- Website: www.eau.ac.ae
- Location within Dubai

Emirates Aviation University (EAU) is a university located in Dubai, United Arab Emirates. It is the educational arm of The Emirates Group. The EAU offers education in aeronautical engineering, aviation management, Aircraft maintenance engineering, business management, aviation safety and security studies.

== History ==
In 1991, Dubai Aviation College was established by the Dubai Civil Aviation Authority to provide aviation related training to private students. In September 2001, the Dubai Aviation College joined with Emirates Training College and was renamed to the Emirates Aviation College. In December 2010, Emirates Aviation College was given the university status by the UAE Ministry of Higher Education and Scientific Research, hence it was renamed Emirates Aviation University.

== See also ==
- Emirates Flight Training Academy
