= Abu Dhabi Northeast Airport =

Sweihan Air Base Abu Dhabi Northeast Airport
- IATA: none; ICAO: OMAW

Summary
- Location: Abu Dhabi Northeast, United Arab Emirates
- Elevation AMSL: 87.99 ft / 26.82 m
- Coordinates: 24°31′33″N 054°58′34″E
- Interactive map of Sweihan Air Base; Abu Dhabi Northeast Airport

Runways
| Direction | Length | | Surface |
| Direction | m | ft | Surface |
|---|---|---|---|
| 13/31 | 3,800 | 12,467 | Asphalt |
- Sources: eAIP UAE

Abu Dhabi Northeast Airport (ICAO: OMAW), also known as Sweihan Air Base, is a military airport located in Abu Dhabi, United Arab Emirates. The airbase was built somewhere around 1988-1990 and it was just a runway, short taxiway and an apron, till 2010 where it underwent a major upgrade, which included new 3800m CAT II runway, new taxiways parallel to the runway, more parking’s and newer facilities for the airport. The expansion was completed in 2014.

Abu Dhabi Northeast Airport is located at an altitude of 26.82 meters above sea level.
