= Qarnayn Airport =

- IATA: none; ICAO: OMAQ

Summary
- Airport type: Private
- Operator: Zakum Development Company
- Location: Qarnayn, UAE
- Time zone: UAE Standard Time (UTC+04:00)
- Elevation AMSL: 14 ft / 4 m
- Coordinates: 24°56′N 052°51′E

Map
- Location in the UAE OMAQ (Persian Gulf) OMAQ (Indian Ocean) OMAQ (Middle East) OMAQ (West and Central Asia) OMAQ (Asia)

Runways
Direction	Length		Surface
Direction	m	ft	Surface
11/29	3,266	10,715	Asphalt
- Sources: UAE AIP

Qarnayn Airport (ICAO: OMAQ) is a small private airfield operated by the Abu Dhabi National Oil Company. It serves the oil field at Qarnayn, Abu Dhabi, UAE.
