= Al Jazeirah Airport =

- IATA: none; ICAO: OMRJ

Summary
- Airport type: Private
- Operator: Al Jazeirah Aviation Club
- Location: Al Jazirah Al Hamra, UAE
- Time zone: UAE Standard Time (UTC+04:00)
- Elevation AMSL: 10 ft / 3 m
- Coordinates: 25°39′55″N 055°46′27″E

Map
- Location in the UAE OMRJ (Persian Gulf) OMRJ (Indian Ocean) OMRJ (Middle East) OMRJ (West and Central Asia) OMRJ (Asia)

Runways
Direction	Length		Surface
Direction	m	ft	Surface
16/34	500	1,640	Tarmac
10/28	765	2,510	Tarmac
- Sources: UAE AIP

Al Jazeirah Airport (ICAO: OMRJ) is a private airfield operated by the Al Jazeirah Aviation Club and is located near Al Jazirah Al Hamra, Ras al-Khaimah, UAE.

== Accident ==
- On December 29, 2024, a flight originating from Al Jazeirah Airport and intended to land at the same airport crashed off the coast of Ras al-Khaimah. In the incident, two people died.
