= Abu Dhabi Petroleum Company =

- Industry: Oil and gas
- Predecessor: Petroleum Development (Trucial Coast) Limited (1930s); Abu Dhabi Petroleum Company (ADPC) (1963)

Abu Dhabi Petroleum Company, formerly known as Petroleum Development (Trucial Coast) Limited, was an oil exploration and development company in Abu Dhabi, United Arab Emirates.

== History ==
The company was founded as Petroleum Development (Trucial Coast) Limited (PDTC), an associate of the Iraq Petroleum Company (IPC). In 1939 it acquired a 75-year concession from Sheikh Shakhbut bin Sultan Al Nahyan for Abu Dhabi. PDTC first discovered oil at the Murban No. 1 well in the Murban Bab oil field in 1953, although it was not viable and was shut down after a fatal accident. During this time PDTC was the only major company with activities visible to the general public of Abu Dhabi, and as such it was known to them simply as "ash-Sharika", or "The Company." Oil was discovered in commercial quantities at the Murban No. 3 well in 1959. Another significant field, the Bu Hasa oil field, was discovered in 1962 when PDTC surrendered its oil concessions elsewhere in the Trucial States and was renamed the Abu Dhabi Petroleum Company (ADPC).

1963 was the year of first oil export from ADPC's discoveries. Although Shakhbut bin Sultan Al Nahyan had long resisted entering into a profit agreement fearing the effects of wealth, ADPC entered into a 50% profit-sharing agreement with Abu Dhabi in 1965. Company headquarters were moved from Bahrain to Abu Dhabi in 1966, at which time a living complex was constructed for company employees in town on the beach. At one point ADPC accounted for two-thirds of the economic activity in Abu Dhabi.

In 1974 the Abu Dhabi National Oil Company purchased a 60% share of ADPC. Corporate reorganization occurred in 1978 as the Abu Dhabi Company for Onshore Oil Explorations in conjunction with several foreign companies.

== Depictions ==
Abu Dhabi Petroleum Company operations were depicted in a set of postage stamps issued by Abu Dhabi in August 1969.

== Bibliography ==
- Abed, Ibrahim; Hellyer, Peter, eds. (2001). United Arab Emirates: A New Perspective. Trident Press. ISBN 9781900724470.
- Heard-Bey, Frauke (2016). Abu Dhabi, the United Arab Emirates and the Gulf Region. Gerlach Press. ISBN 9783940924780.
- Low, Linda (2012). Abu Dhabi's Vision 2030: An Ongoing Journey of Economic Development. Singapore: World Scientific. ISBN 978-9814383929.
- Reem Bani Hashim, Alamira (2018). Planning Abu Dhabi. Taylor & Francis. ISBN 9781351401531.
- Snee, Charles, ed. (April 2014). Scott Standard Postage Stamp Catalog. Vol. 1. Sidney, Ohio: Scott Publishing Co. p. 292. ISBN 978-0-89487-488-8.
- Vassiliou, M. S., ed. (June 20, 2018). Historical Dictionary of the Petroleum Industry. Rowman & Littlefield Publishers. ISBN 978-1538111604.
