= Al Futaisi =

Island in the United Arab Emirates

Al Futaisi Island
Native name: جزيرة الفطيسي
- Location within United Arab Emirates

Geography
- Location: Abu Dhabi Central Capital District
- Coordinates: 24°21′14″N 54°19′14″E

Administration
- United Arab Emirates
- Emirate: Abu Dhabi

Al Futaisi (Arabic: الفطيسي) is an island about 8-kilometre (5.0-mile) southwest of Abu Dhabi in the United Arab Emirates with a size of approximately 50-square-kilometre (12,000-acre).

The largest part of the island, which is 10-kilometre (6.2-mile) long and 5-kilometre (3.1-mile) wide, is a wildlife sanctuary. There is a tourist ecotourism resort on the island. Animals such as Dugong, Osprey, lizards (Uromastyx) and Gazelles exist on the island.

== History ==
In 2002, archaeologists discovered 22 ancient water catchments on the island. The catchements showed a survival technique used in the region previously to collect water. A total of 38 archaeological sites have been discovered on Futaisi Island.

== Transportation ==
Futaisi is not connected to the mainland by a bridge and is primarily accessed via its boat dock. The island also contains the remains of Futaysi Airport, a planned private airfield that was never completed and consists only of an abandoned sand runway.
