= Jebel Dhana Airport =

- IATA: none; ICAO: OMAJ

Summary
- Airport type: Private
- Owner: Abu Dhabi Company for Onshore Oil Operations
- Operator: Abu Dhabi Company for Onshore Oil Operations
- Location: Jebel Dhana, UAE
- Time zone: UAE Standard Time (UTC+04:00)
- Elevation AMSL: 43 ft / 13 m
- Coordinates: 24°10′55″N 052°37′25″E

Map
- Location in the UAE OMAJ (Persian Gulf) OMAJ (Indian Ocean) OMAJ (Middle East) OMAJ (West and Central Asia) OMAJ (Asia)

Runways
Direction	Length		Surface
Direction	m	ft	Surface
13/31	2,200	7,218	Tarmac
- Sources: UAE AIP

Jebel Dhana Airport (ICAO: OMAJ) is a small private airfield operated by ADCO and serves the oil field at Jebel Dhana, Abu Dhabi, UAE.
