= Futaysi Airport =

- IATA: none; ICAO: OMAF

Summary
- Airport type: Private
- Location: Al Futaisi, UAE
- Time zone: UAE Standard Time (UTC+04:00)
- Elevation AMSL: 15 ft / 5 m
- Coordinates: 24°22′44″N 054°18′58″E

Map
- Location in the UAE OMAF (Persian Gulf) OMAF (Indian Ocean) OMAF (Middle East) OMAF (West and Central Asia) OMAF (Asia)

Runways
Direction	Length		Surface
Direction	m	ft	Surface
13/31	1,000	3,281	Compacted sand
- Sources: UAE AIP

Futaysi Airport (ICAO: OMAF) was a planned airfield on Al Futaisi island, United Arab Emirates. The airport was never completed, with the only visible progress being the compacted sand runway.

It was intended to be a private airfield owned and operated by Hamad bin Hamdan Al Nahyan.
