= Arzanah Island =

Island in the United Arab Emirates

Native name: جزيرة أرزنة
- Location within United Arab Emirates

Geography
- Coordinates: 24°47′38″N 52°33′42″E

Administration
- United Arab Emirates
- Emirate: Abu Dhabi

Arzanah Island (Arabic: جزيرة أرزنة) is an island located about 180 km (110 mi) northwest of Abu Dhabi about 116 km (72 mi) from Khor Al Adaid. It is 19 km (12 mi) long and 1.6 km (0.99 mi) wide, the northern part of the island is full of hills, there is a point 61 m (200 ft) above sea level, the southern part is plain. There is no fresh water on the island. In the past it was the headquarters of pearl fisheries. There is a modern housing complex on the island for employees of ZADCO Oil Exploration Company.
