= Bu Hasa oil field =

Oilfield in United Arab Emirates

Bu Hasa Oil Field
- Country: United Arab Emirates
- Region: Persian Gulf
- Offshore/onshore: onshore
- Operator: Abu Dhabi Company for Onshore Oil Operations

Field history
- Discovery: 1962
- Start of production: 1962

Production
- Current production of oil: 600,000 barrels per day (~3.0×10^{7} t/a)
- Estimated oil in place: 920 million tonnes (~ 1.04×10^{9} m^{3} or 6520 million bbl)
- Estimated gas in place: 8,300×10^{9} cu ft (240×10^{9} m^{3})

The Bu Hasa Oil Field is an oil field in Abu Dhabi. It was discovered in 1962 and developed by Abu Dhabi Petroleum Company. The oil field is owned by Abu Dhabi National Oil Company and operated by Abu Dhabi Company for Onshore Oil Operations. The total proven reserves of the Bu Hasa oil field are around 6.52 billion barrels (1.45 billion tonnes), and production is centered on 600,000 barrels per day (95,000 m^{3}/d).
