= T. S. Lippy =

American gold prospector (c. 1860–1931)

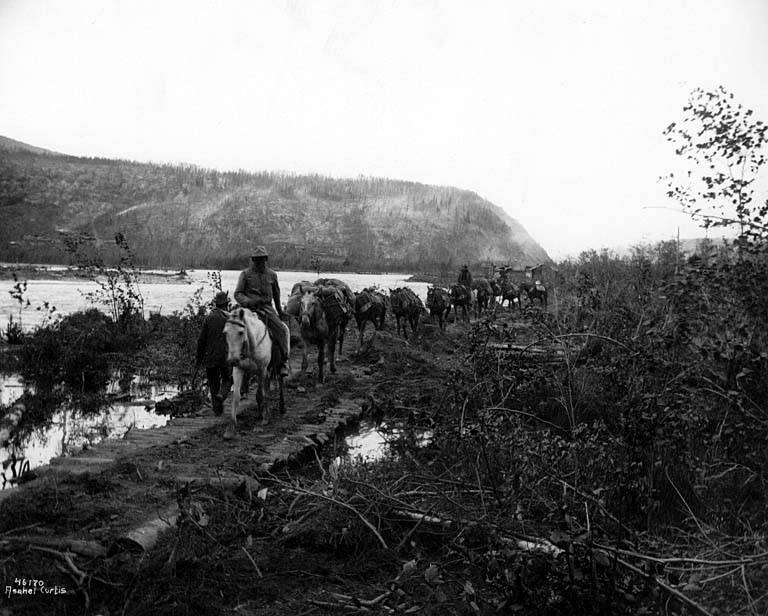
T. S. Lippy returning from the Yukon with a packtrain in 1899, carrying about one ton of gold

Thomas Sergent Lippy (December 2, 1860 – September 13, 1931), know variously as T. S., Thomas or Tom S. Lippy, was an American millionaire and philanthropist who became wealthy as a prospector in the Klondike Gold Rush.

Lippy was the athletic director of or an instructor at the Seattle YMCA, before he and his wife Salome headed north in search of gold in 1896 or 1897 after an injury forced him to leave his YMCA job. Some Scotsmen from Nanaimo had staked claims Fourteen to Seventeen on Eldorado Creek in the Klondike region of Canada. They decided to abandon Sixteen and Seventeen in order to concentrate on some other claims. Lippy had a claim further up the creek, but restaked Sixteen because his wife wanted a cabin, and there was timber there. Sixteen proved to be one of the richest claims of the gold rush.

Salome Lippy was the first white woman in the area, until she was joined by Ethel Berry. Clarence and Ethel Berry, who also became rich, were neighbors of the Lippys, living a mile away.

On July 25, 1898, the Lippys arrived in San Francisco aboard the Excelsior, the first ship to reach the lower United States from the Klondike with now-wealthy prospectors; the Lippys brought with them gold valued, according to the Chicago Tribune, at "not less than $200,000." He sold his holdings in 1903. That same year he became an investor in The Seattle Automobile Company, the first car dealership in the city.

He and his wife went on a worldwide tour, before building a lavishly decorated 15-room house in Seattle. He gave generously to the YMCA, the First United Methodist Church and the Anti-Saloon League, and donated the land for a five-story addition to Seattle General Hospital. He also established a free hospital for miners in Dawson City, and sent "a library of 1000 volumes" to Skagway, Alaska.

He won the 1907 Pacific Northwest Amateur golf tournament and was the Port Commissioner of the Port of Seattle from 1918 to 1921.

Unfortunately, his business investments, "a mattress-and-upholstery company, a brick company, a trust-and-savings bank, and the Lippy Building", all failed, and he died bankrupt in 1931 at the age of 71. However, his widow was provided with $50 a month from a hospital land agreement. Salome Lippy died in 1938.
