= Solar thermal enhanced oil recovery =

Solar thermal energy

Solar thermal enhanced oil recovery (abbreviated solar EOR) is a form of thermal enhanced oil recovery (EOR), a technique applied by oil producers to extract more oil from maturing oil fields. Solar EOR uses solar thermal arrays to concentrate the sun's energy to heat water and generate steam. The steam is injected into an oil reservoir to reduce the viscosity, or thin, heavy crude thus facilitating its flow to the surface. Thermal recovery processes, also known as steam injection, have traditionally burned natural gas to produce steam. Solar EOR is proving to be a viable alternative to gas-fired steam production for the oil industry. Solar EOR can generate the same quality steam as natural gas, reaching temperatures up to 750 °F (399 °C) and 2,500 PSI.

While typical fuel-fired steamflood operations inject steam into the ground at a constant rate, research conducted by leading oil producers shows that variable rate steam injection has no negative impact on production levels. In effect, solar EOR could supply up to 80 percent of a field's annual steam requirements, by injecting solar-generated steam during the sunny hours, and a reduced amount of gas-fired steam at night or in less sunny weather or climates. This method of integrating solar EOR will displace larger amounts of gas consumption without affecting oil output.

== Technology ==
While there are many types of solar-to-steam technologies, often referred to as solar thermal or concentrated solar power, only two are currently deployed for solar EOR.

=== Central tower ===
Originally designed for generating electricity, central tower, or power tower technology, uses a field of large tracking mirrors, called heliostats, to concentrate the sunlight on a boiler filled with water that rests on a central tower. The sun's energy is reflected on the boiler to produce steam, which is used to turn a traditional turbine to create electricity. For EOR, the process ends at steam production. High-temperature steam made from demineralized water in the tower receiver passes through a heat exchanger, generating steam of lower temperature from high-contamination oilfield feedwater at lower temperatures. The steam is fed into distribution headers which lead to injection wells, which convey steam into the oil-bearing formation.

=== Enclosed trough ===
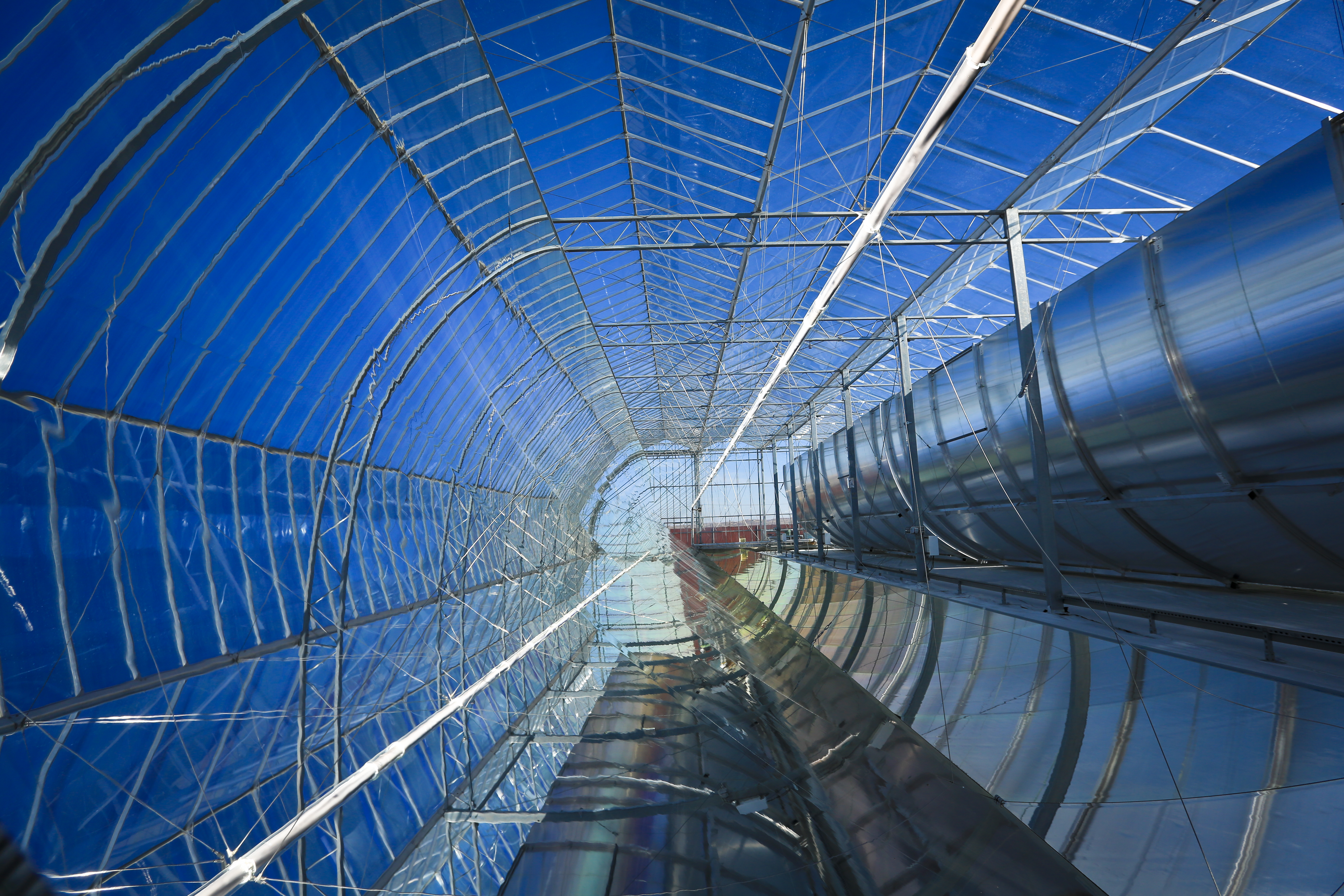
Inside an enclosed trough system

The enclosed trough architecture encapsulates the solar thermal system within a greenhouse-like glasshouse. The glasshouse creates a protected environment to withstand the elements that can negatively impact reliability and efficiency of the solar thermal system.

Lightweight curved solar-reflecting mirrors are suspended within the glasshouse structure. A single-axis tracking system positions the mirrors to track the sun and focus its light onto a network of stationary steel pipes, also suspended from the glasshouse structure. Steam is generated directly, using oil field-quality water, as water flows from the inlet throughout the length of the pipes, without heat exchangers or intermediate working fluids.

The steam produced is then fed directly to the field's existing steam distribution network, where the steam is continuously injected deep into the oil reservoir. Sheltering the mirrors from the wind allows them to achieve higher temperature rates and prevents dust from building up as a result from exposure to humidity. GlassPoint Solar, the company that created the Enclosed Trough method, states its technology can produce heat for EOR for about $5 per million British thermal units in sunny regions, compared to between $10 and $12 for other conventional solar thermal technologies.

== Recent projects ==
=== 21Z in McKittrick, California ===
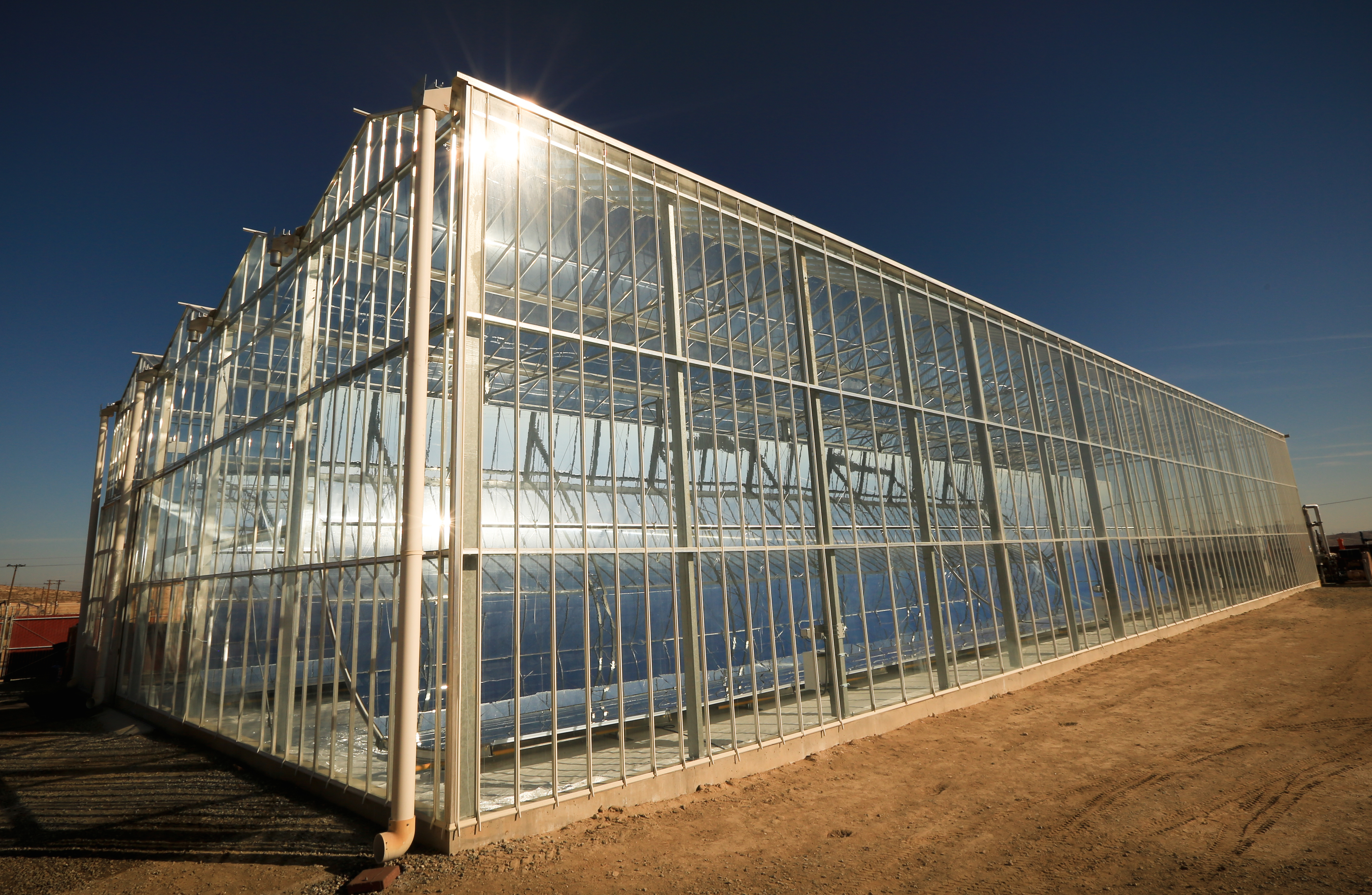
World's first commercial solar EOR project, located in Kern Country, CA, USA.

GlassPoint Solar partnered with Berry Petroleum, California's largest independent oil producer, to deploy the world's first commercial solar EOR project. Commissioned in February 2011, the project is located on a 100-year-old McKittrick Oil Field in McKittrick, California. Coined the Kern County 21Z Solar Project, the system spans roughly one acre and will produce approximately one million Btus per hour of solar heat, replacing natural gas used for steam generation. The solar EOR project was constructed in less than six weeks and is the first installation of GlassPoint's enclosed trough technology in an oil field.

=== Coalinga in Coalinga, California ===
In October 2011, Chevron Corp. and BrightSource Energy revealed a 29-megawatt solar- to-steam facility at the Coalinga Oil Field in Fresno County, California. The Coalinga solar EOR project spans 100 acres and consists of 3,822 mirror systems, or heliostats, each with two 10-foot (3-meter) by 7-foot mirrors mounted on a 6-foot steel pole focusing light on a 327-foot solar tower.

BrightSource was contracted to provide the technology, engineering and production and construction services, and Chevron Technology Ventures will manage operations of the project. The facility began construction in 2009. It was reported that Chevron spent more than its $28 million on the contract, and BrightSource has lost at least $40 million on the project and disclosed it will lose much more.

=== Petroleum Development Oman ===
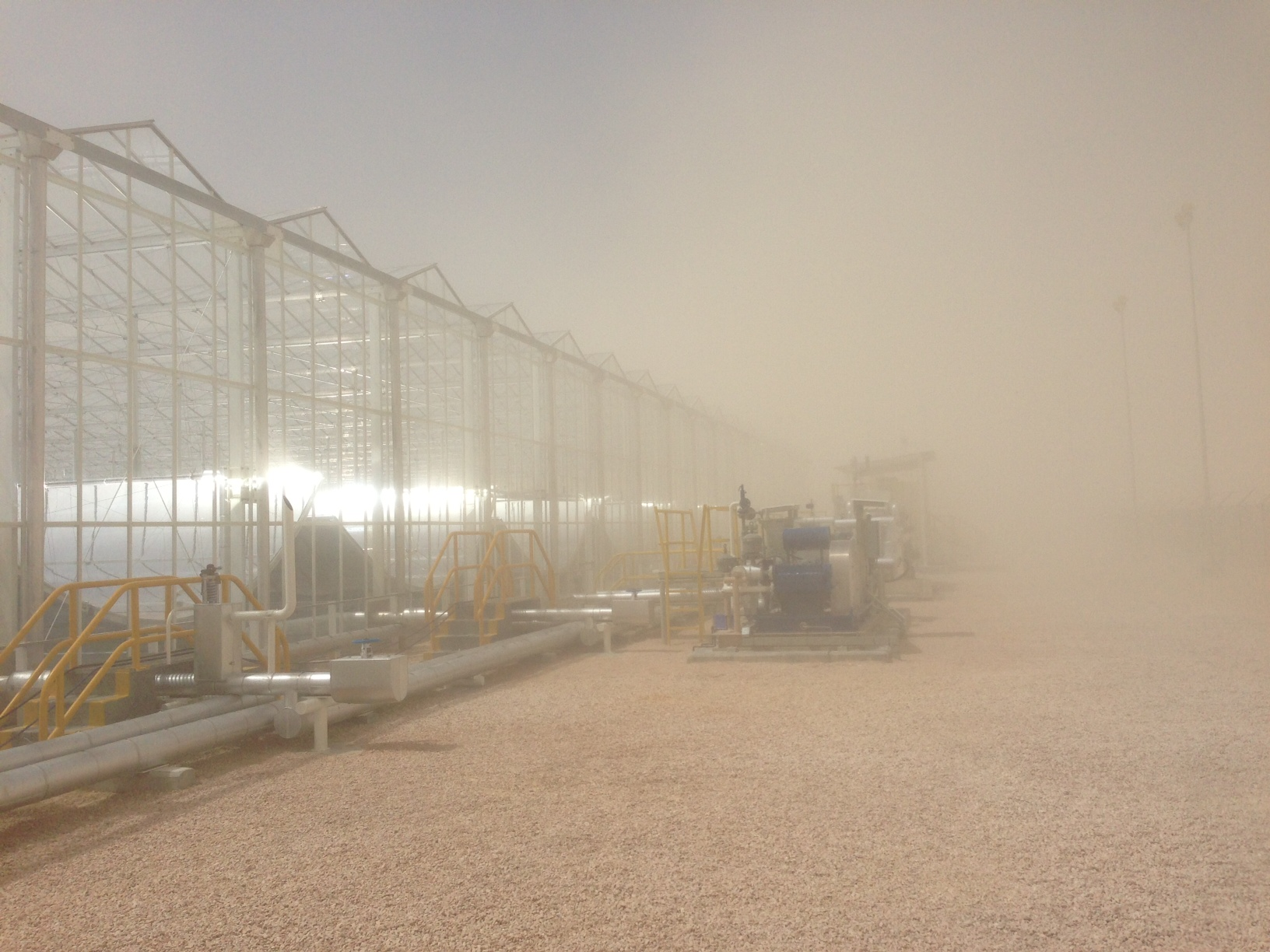
7MW Solar EOR project in Amal, Oman

In May 2013, GlassPoint Solar and Petroleum Development Oman (PDO) commissioned the Middle East's first solar EOR project. PDO is a joint venture between the Sultanate of Oman, Shell and Total. The 7 MW solar EOR facility produces a daily average of 50 tons of emissions-free steam that feeds directly into existing thermal EOR operations at PDO's Amal West field in Southern Oman. The system in 27 times larger than GlassPoint's first installation at Berry Petroleum's 21Z oil field. Reports by Petroleum Development Oman indicate that the pilot was delivered on-time, under-budget, and above contract output specifications, with zero lost time injuries. In the first year of operations, the fully automated system successfully exceeded all performance tests and production targets. The system recorded a 98.6% uptime, significantly exceeding PDO's expectations. Even during severe dust and sandstorms, the system has proven to maintain regular operations.

In 2015 Oman announced Miraah, a $600 million, 1 gigawatt solar-thermal facility by 2017 at Amal West. The plant will cover 3 square kilometres (1.2 sq mi) with 36 large greenhouse protecting the solar collectors from sand and dust. Oman anticipates that the new solar project will replace 5.6 trillion BTUs of natural gas each year, which is equivalent to the amount required to produce electricity for 209,000 people in Oman. In August 2017, GlassPoint and its contractors crossed the threshold of 1.5 million man-hours worked without lost time injury (LTI) at Miraah.

In November 2017, GlassPoint and Petroleum Development Oman (PDO) completed construction on the first block of the Miraah solar plant safely on schedule and on budget, and successfully delivered steam to the Amal West oilfield.

=== Belridge Solar ===
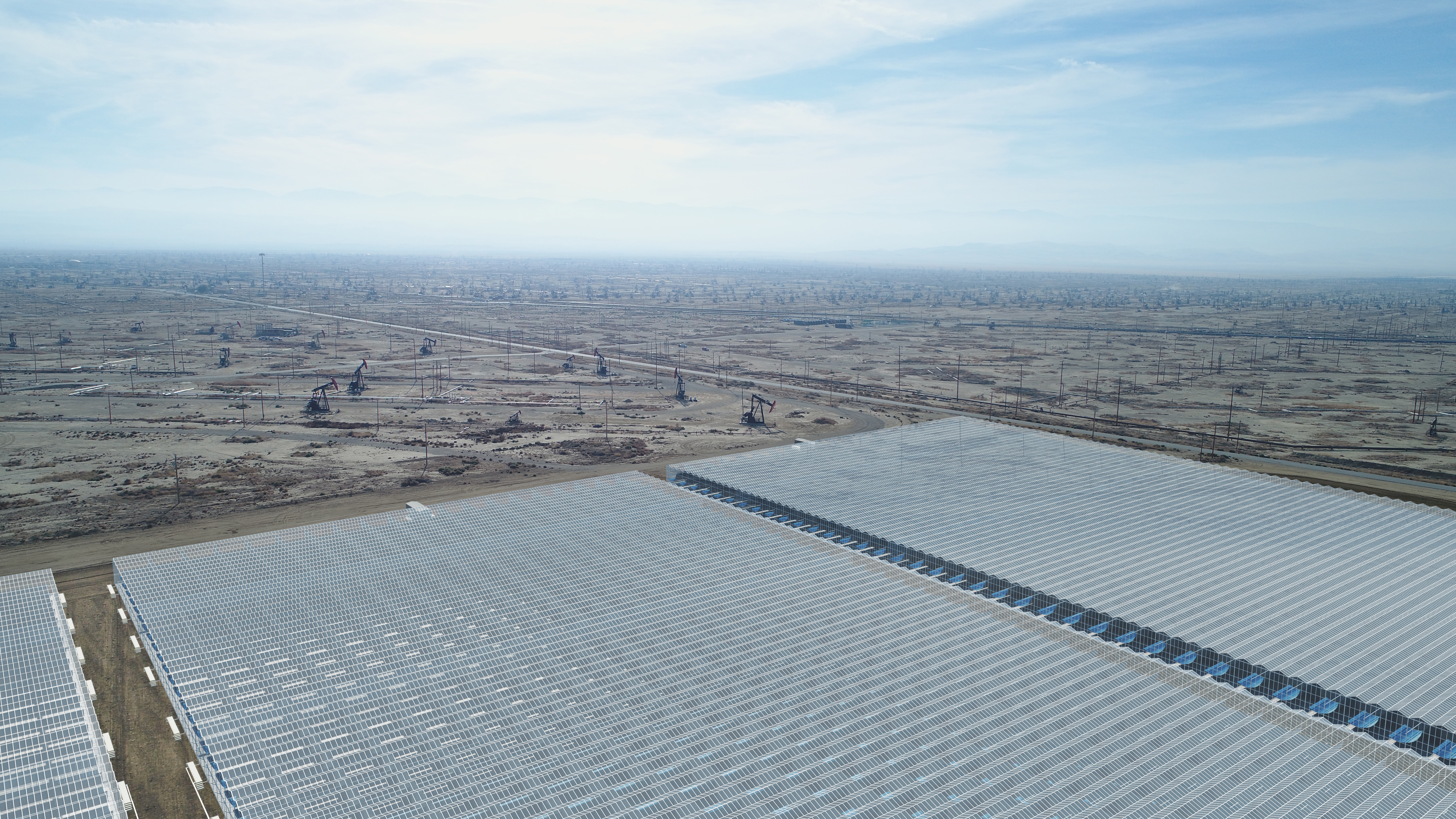
A rendering of future solar field at South Belridge

The Belridge Solar Project is a joint venture between GlassPoint Solar and Aera Energy. The project was announced in November 2017 and, when completed, is projected to produce approximately 12 million barrels of steam per year through a 850MW thermal solar steam generator. The project will be located at the South Belridge Oil Field, near Bakersfield, California, and will be the state's largest solar EOR field when completed. It will also cut carbon emissions from the facility by 376,000 metric tons per year.

== Market ==
The global market for EOR technologies was $4.7 billion in 2009 and is expected to grow at a 5-year compound annual rate of 28 percent, reaching $16.3 billion in 2014. While quickly gaining traction, it is predicated solar EOR will have minimal impact on the market till 2015. As solar EOR scales up, oil producers will consume less gas for oil production

According to research analysts at Raymond James, solar EOR can be done more cost effectively than using gas, even as current depressed prices. Steam represents as much as 60 percent of the production cost for heavily oil extraction. In addition to being cost competitive with gas, solar EOR provides a hedge against long-term gas price escalation. Long-term price projections put natural gas at $5.00 per thousand cubic feet, considerably higher than the 2011 forecast of $3.75 per thousand cubic feet. When an oil producer invests in a solar EOR system, all costs are upfront and the standard life of the equipment is 30 years.

=== United States ===
California is a promising geography for solar EOR with its high level of sunshine and vast heavy oil reserves. Currently, 40 percent of California's oil production deploys steam injection for EOR and in a few years will grow to 60 percent. Together five heavy oil producers – Chevron, Aera Energy, Berry Petroleum, Plains and Occidental – consume about 283 Bcf of gas annually. This equals 1.3 percent of total demand in the United States. However, analysts say that solar EOR could replace 20 percent of the natural gas used for EOR in California.

=== Middle East ===
The Persian Gulf has exceptionally favorable insolation, which in some locations exceeds levels in the Mojave Desert, which is a factor in making solar EOR very promising there. The other factor is less obvious but even more important: with the exception of Qatar, Persian Gulf countries are short of natural gas and actually have to import gas. The limited natural gas supplies is made worse by growing local economies that require natural gas for desalination, electricity and other industrial uses.

By using solar, instead of gas, to generate steam for EOR, Middle Eastern companies can extend their domestic natural gas supplies to higher value uses. This is especially relevant for Oman, which is aggressively pursuing EOR – for example at the Mukhaizna field, which is operated by Occidental Petroleum. Oman built a natural gas export terminal, but since its oil production peaked in 2000, the country redirected the gas for used in its EOR operations. The scarcity of gas in Oman means the price there is around $10 per thousand cubic feet. Oman currently uses a significant amount of its natural gas for EOR. A report published by Ernst & Young in January 2014 found that full-scale deployment of solar EOR in Oman, in which solar steam accounted for 80% of Oman's thermal EOR needs, could save up to half a billion cubic feet (bcf) of gas per day and contribute more than $12B in Omani GDP by 2023.

== History ==
In 1983, ARCO Solar constructed a solar steam generation pilot using central tower technology in Taft, California. The system generated one megawatt of thermal energy during peak operating conditions. Though technically feasible, the system was not cost-effective and was not replicated. [4] The ARCO pilot was the first time solar steam was applied to facilitate heavy oil recovery.
