= War Memorial Stadium (Wyoming) =

Stadium in Laramie, Wyoming

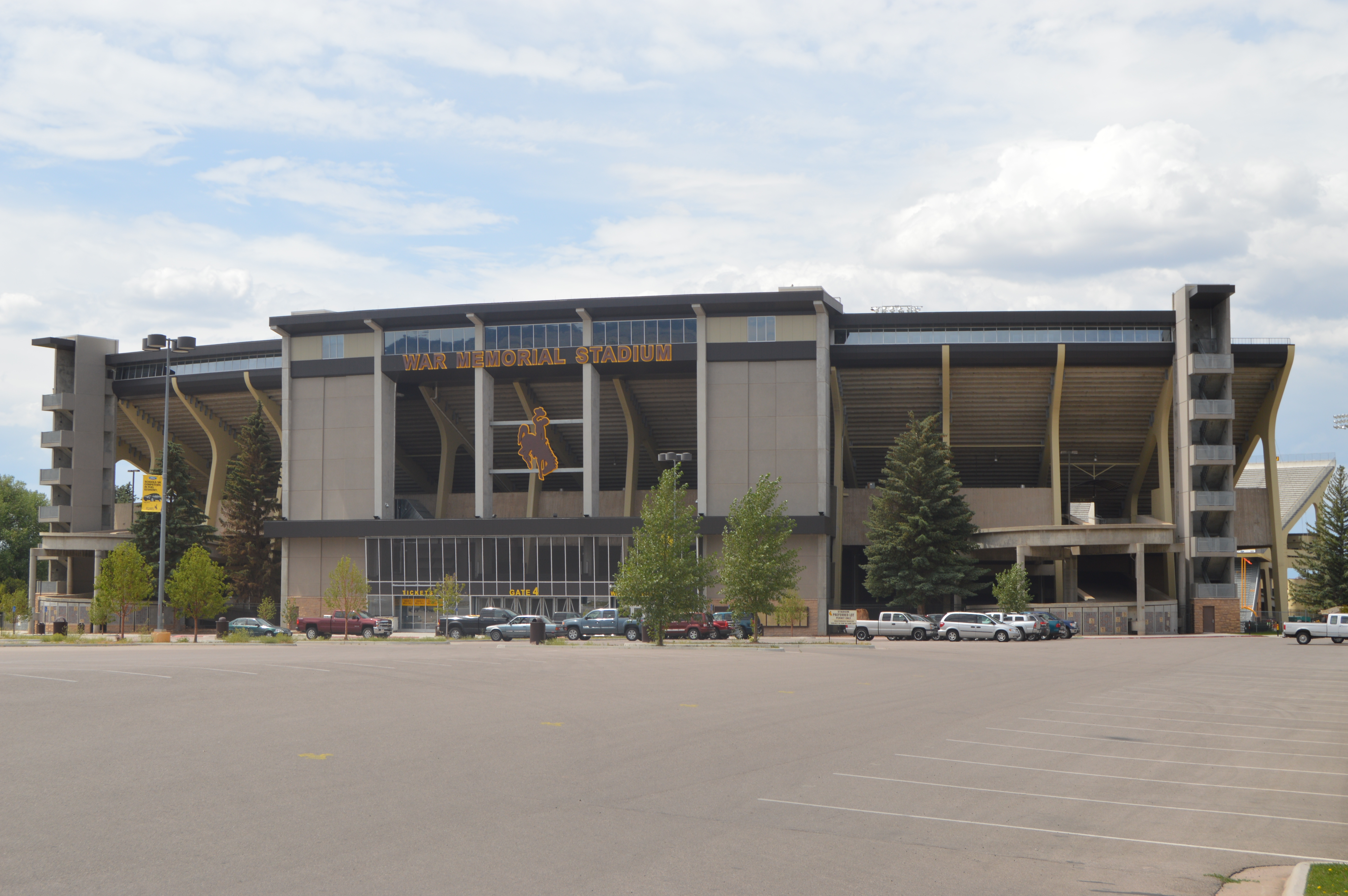
- Looking west in August 2015

- Location in the United States Location in Wyoming
- Interactive map of War Memorial Stadium
- Full name: Jonah Field at War Memorial Stadium
- Former names: War Memorial Stadium
- Address: E Grand Ave & N 22nd St
- Location: University of Wyoming; Laramie, Wyoming, U.S.
- Coordinates: 41.312°N 105.568°W
- Elevation: 7,220 feet (2,200 m) AMSL
- Owner: University of Wyoming
- Operator: University of Wyoming
- Capacity: 29,181
- Surface: FieldTurf (2013–present); Desso turf (2005–2012); Natural grass (1950–2004)
- Record attendance: 34,745 (vs. Colorado State, 1997)

Construction
- Groundbreaking: August 15, 1949 (grounds); March 1, 1950 (building)
- Opened: September 16, 1950; 76 years ago
- Renovated: 2004, 2010
- Expanded: 1970, 1977
- Cost: $1.53 million ($20.5 million in 2025) (combined with Fieldhouse) $50 million+ (2009-2010 upgrades)
- Architect: Porter & Bradley
- General contractors: The Spiegelberg Lumber and Building Company

Tenant
- Wyoming Cowboys (NCAA) (1950–present)

War Memorial Stadium, also known as Jonah Field at War Memorial Stadium, is an outdoor college football stadium in the Western United States, located on the campus of the University of Wyoming in Laramie, Wyoming.

The home field of the Wyoming Cowboys of the Mountain West Conference in NCAA Division I FBS, it is the largest stadium in the state, and its only college football venue. The field is named after a natural gas field at the Green River Basin in Sublette County.

At an elevation of 7,222 feet (2,201 m) above sea level, War Memorial is the highest FBS stadium, followed by the U.S. Air Force Academy's Falcon Stadium at 6,621 feet (2,018 m), near Colorado Springs. Walkup Skydome, home to FCS Northern Arizona, is between the two at 6,880 feet (2,100 m).

== History ==
Along with the War Memorial Fieldhouse, War Memorial Stadium was built in the spring and summer of 1950. The stadium replaced Corbett Field, a small field opened in 1922 and located southeast of Half Acre Gym on land now occupied by the Business School and the student union parking lot.

It originally sat 20,000 in grandstands on the east and west sides of the field. In 1970, the western upper deck, containing 5,500 seats and a new press box, was added; the eastern press box and northern bleachers were added in 1978, bringing capacity up to 33,500. The playing field runs mostly in the traditional north–south configuration; it is slightly skewed to the northeast and southwest about 10°.

Below the new north end zone scoreboard is a 5 ft 2 in (1.6 m) statue Cowboy Tough by Chris Navarro. Fanning a Twister, located to the north of the stadium at the main entrance to the athletic complex, is modeled after a photo of Guy Holt riding Steamboat, the 1909 winner of "Worst Horse" at Frontier Park in Cheyenne. In the 1920s, an equipment manager named Deane Hunton found the picture. Thinking it embodied the spirit of the athletics program and the cowboy life, he stenciled an outline of the photograph, which became the iconic logo of the university (also found on Wyoming license plates since 1936 and many other places around the state).

=== Renovations ===
The stadium during a 2015 Wyoming Cowboys football game

In 2001, a new video scoreboard was added and the bleachers in the north end zone were moved to the south end zone. In 2004, the western stands were refurbished and the press box expanded. In 2005, the natural grass at War Memorial Stadium was replaced by infilled artificial turf, similar to FieldTurf. The new surface, known as "Desso Challenge Pro 60 Monofilament Synthetic Turf," was the first of its kind in Division I-A (now FBS) football. It was replaced in 2013 by FieldTurf with enhanced graphics.

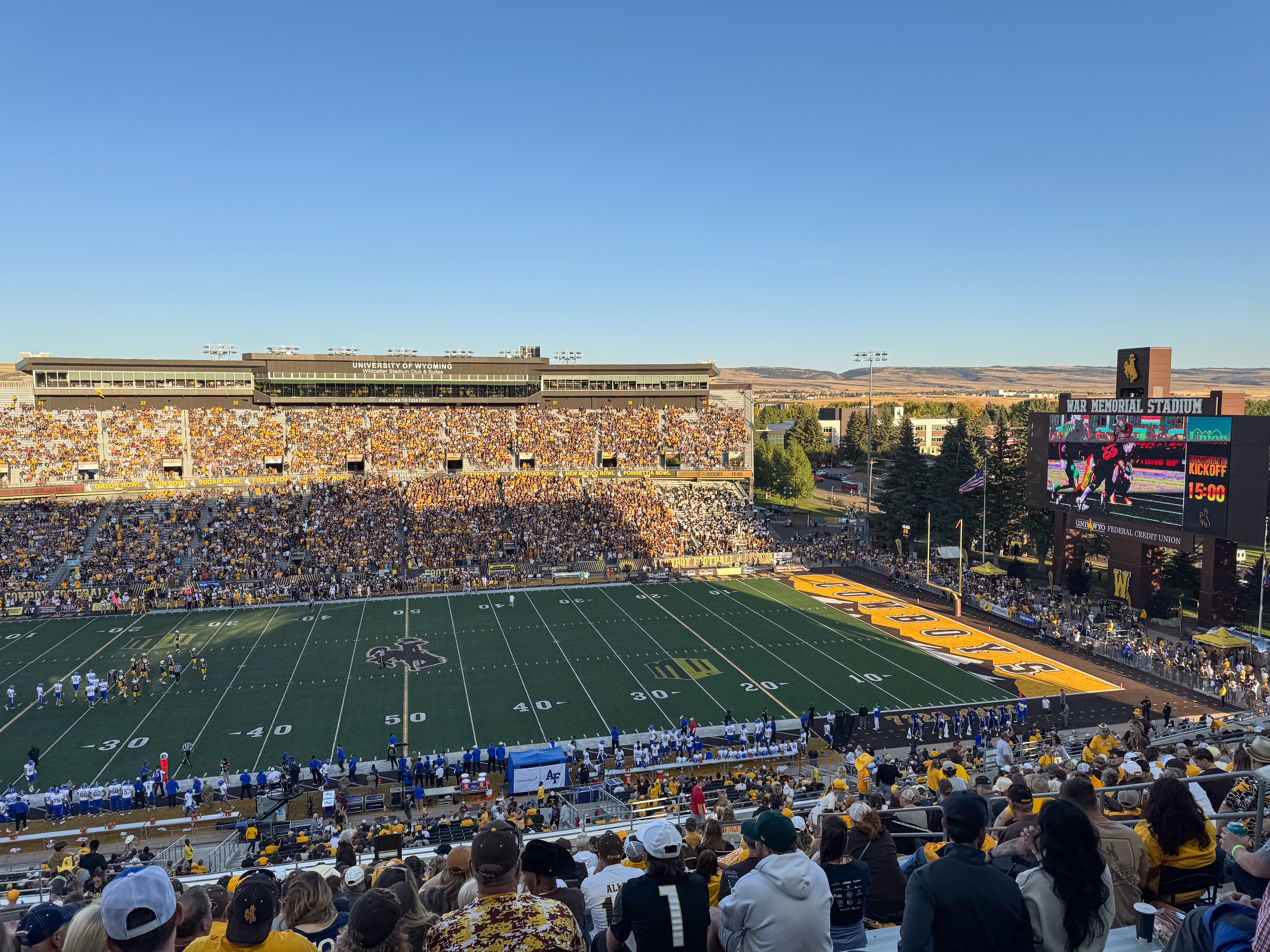
War Memorial Stadium in 2024

The field itself was renamed "Jonah Field" in honor of the Wyoming gas fields owned by the primary benefactors of the turf project, the Martin and McMurry families.

Capacity was reduced in 2004 to 32,580 and in 2007 to 30,514. Before the 2010 season, the new Wildcatter Stadium Club and Suites opened and capacity was further reduced to 30,181. The Wildcatter features 12 individual suites along with a stadium-club area that contains 256 indoor seats.

In the fall of 2023 the University announced that new renovations would take place over the course of two stages, stage one being in the spring of 2024 and the spring of 2025. Capacity was reduced to 29,181.

== Other uses ==
In addition to UW home games, the stadium also hosts the annual movie in the stadium for new students, the freshman pep rally, and the high school football state championships.

== See also ==
- List of NCAA Division I FBS football stadiums
