= Belridge Solar =

Oil recovery facility in South Belridge Oil Field

Coordinates: 35.4560°N 119.7246°W

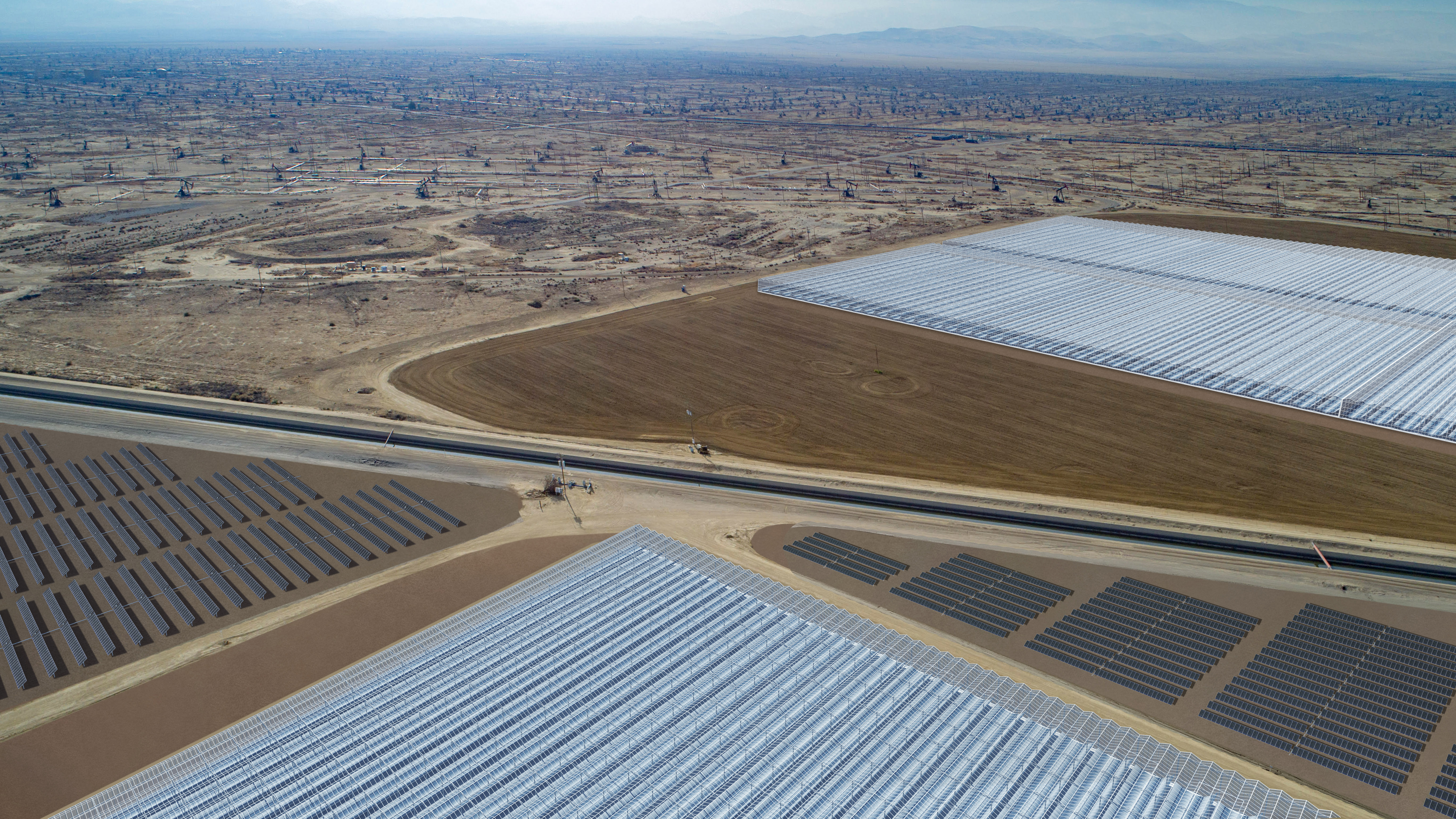
A rendering of the in-development Belridge Solar Facility

Belridge Solar is an enhanced oil recovery facility that is currently being developed in the South Belridge Oil Field and, when complete, will be California’s largest solar energy field. It is a joint project between Aera Energy and GlassPoint Solar. It will be the first in the world to incorporate solar steam generation with solar electricity generation. These technologies will be leveraged to reduce costs for the traditional oil and gas company while at the same time reducing emitted carbon and increasing local air quality.

The Belridge Oil Field resides near Bakersfield, California. The facility was first announced in November 2017.

== Technology ==
EOR includes a process for injecting steam deep into an oil reservoir. The steam heats the oil, which loosens it to be more easily pumped to the surface. Commonly, liquefied natural gas is burned to heat water in order to generate that steam. With solar EOR, however, solar thermal energy is harnessed via a parabolic trough enclosed in a greenhouse to create steam.

== Impact ==
Once completed, the facility is projected to produce 12 million barrels of steam annually through a 850MW thermal solar steam generator. It is planned to reduce the natural gas used at the Belridge Oil Field for the production and extraction of heavy oil in its enhanced oil recovery process (EOR).

Additionally, a separate 26.5 MW electricity generating facility using photovoltaic panels is planned to power oilfield operations.

The new facility is predicted to reduce carbon emissions by more than 376,000 metric tons annually. This will offset more than one-third of all the cars driven in Bakersfield. It is also expected to create hundreds of jobs throughout California.

This project highlights a growing trend of oil and gas companies partnering with the solar energy industry.
