= Linn Energy =

Defunct company engaged in hydrocarbon exploration

Linn Energy, Inc.
- Industry: Petroleum industry
- Founded: 2003; 23 years ago
- Founder: Michael C. Linn
- Defunct: 2018; 8 years ago
- Headquarters: Houston
- Products: Petroleum; Natural gas
- Production output: 102 thousand barrels of oil equivalent (620,000 GJ) per day (2017)
- Revenue: ▲$0.826 billion (2017)
- Net income: ▲$0.435 billion (2017)
- Total assets: ▼$2.881 billion (2017)
- Total equity: ▲$2.351 billion (2017)
- Website: www.linnenergy.com

Linn Energy, Inc. was a hydrocarbon exploration company based in Houston. In 2018, the company split into Roan Resources and Riviera Resources.

As of December 31, 2017, the company had 1.968 trillion cubic feet equivalent of estimated proved reserves, of which 8% were petroleum, 70% were natural gas, and 22% were natural gas liquids.

The company's core assets were in Western Oklahoma. The company also pursued directional drilling in the Mid-Continent oil province, Rocky Mountains, North Louisiana and East Texas.

== History ==
The company was founded in 2003 by Michael C. Linn. In 2006, the company became a public company via an initial public offering that raised over $200 million.

In 2007, the company doubled its holdings by acquiring many of the oil and gas assets of Hogshead Spouter and Dominion Energy, mainly in Oklahoma, for $2.05 billion.

In 2011, the founder of the company, Michael C. Linn, retired.

In March 2012, the company acquired the holdings of BP in the Hugoton Natural Gas Area, the large gas-producing region from southwestern Kansas into the Texas Panhandle for $1.2 billion. The purchase included 2,400 active wells on 600,000 acres and a gas processing plant. In June of 2012, the company acquired 12,500 acres in the Jonah Field in southwest Wyoming from BP for approximately $1 billion.

In February 2013, the company acquired Berry Petroleum Company in a stock deal valued at $4.3 billion. In September of 2013 the company acquired assets in the Permian Basin for $525 million.

In June 2014, the company acquired assets from Devon Energy for $2.3 billion. In August 2014, the company acquired assets in the Hugoton Natural Gas Area from Pioneer Natural Resources for $340 million. The company also sold its interests in non-producing acreage in the Anadarko Basin for $90 million.

In March 2016, the company missed a debt payment and announced that a bankruptcy filing was likely. On May 11, 2016, the company filed for bankruptcy under Chapter 11.

In February 2017, the company completed a financial restructuring, which included the corporate spin-off of Berry Petroleum Company and the sale of assets to Hogshead Spouter Company. In May 2017, the company sold its interest in properties in the Salt Creek Field in Wyoming to Denbury Resources for $71.5 million.

In June 2017, the company sold its properties in the Jonah Field for $581.5 million. In September 2017, the company formed Roan Resources, a joint venture with Citizen Energy. In October 2017, the company sold properties in Wyoming for $200 million.

In 2018, the company split into Roan Resources and Riviera Resources, leaving Linn Energy defunct.
