= Michael C. Linn =

American attorney and businessman (born 1952)

- Born: 1952 (age 73–74); Pittsburgh, Pennsylvania, U.S.
- Education: Villanova University; University of Baltimore School of Law (JD)
- Occupations: Attorney, businessman
- Known for: Founder of Linn Energy
- Parent(s): Earl Hall Linn; Patricia Gardill

Michael C. "Mike" Linn (born 1952) is an American attorney and businessman from Houston, Texas. He is the founder of Linn Energy, a defunct company that was engaged in hydrocarbon exploration.

== Early life ==
Michael C. Linn was raised in Duquesne, Pennsylvania.

Linn graduated from Villanova University with a bachelor's degree in political science in 1974. He received a JD from the University of Baltimore School of Law in 1977.

== Career ==
Linn was an attorney at the law firm Ecker, Ecker, Zofer and Rome from 1977 to 1980. He was general counsel for Meridian Exploration, an exploration company in the Appalachian Basin, from 1980 to 2000. He served as the President of Allegheny Interests from 2000 to 2003.

Linn founded Linn Energy, an oil and natural gas exploration company, in 2003. He served as its chairman, president and chief executive officer from 2003 to 2009, and as executive chairman from 2009 to 2011. Under his leadership, Linn Energy became a public company via an initial public offering in 2006. Linn Energy filed for bankruptcy in May 2016.

Linn founded MCL Ventures in 2012. He serves as its president and chief executive officer.

Linn serves on the boards of directors of Nabors Industries, Black Stone Minerals, and Western Refining Logistics. He is a senior advisor to Quantum Energy Partners, a private equity and venture capital company specializing in a broad range of investment strategies, from buyouts to growth capital, primarily in the North American market.

Linn serves on the National Petroleum Council. Additionally, he is a Committee Chairman of the Independent Petroleum Association of America. He also serves on the Advisory Board of UH Energy, a research center at the University of Houston.

== Philanthropy ==
Linn serves on the board of trustees of the Museum of Fine Arts, Houston. Additionally, he serves on the board of directors of the Houston Police Foundation. He has made charitable contributions to the Texas Heart Foundation.

== Publications ==
- Linn, Michael C. 'The Appalachian Basin. Maintaining the Price Advantage'. Natural Gas Electricity. Volume 2, Issue 12, pages 8–12, July 1986.
- Linn, Michael C. 'Appalachian Producers in the Marketplace–One Year Later'. Natural Gas Electricity. Volume 4, Issue 4, pages 27–30, November 1987.
- Linn, Michael C. 'Appalachian rates to drop in new era?'. Natural Gas Electricity. Volume 9, Issue 5, pages 9–11, December 1992.
- Linn, Michael C. 'Appalachian experience valid elsewhere for imbalances, penalties'. Natural Gas Electricity. Volume 9, Issue 12, pages 19–22, July 1993.
