= Ethel Berry =

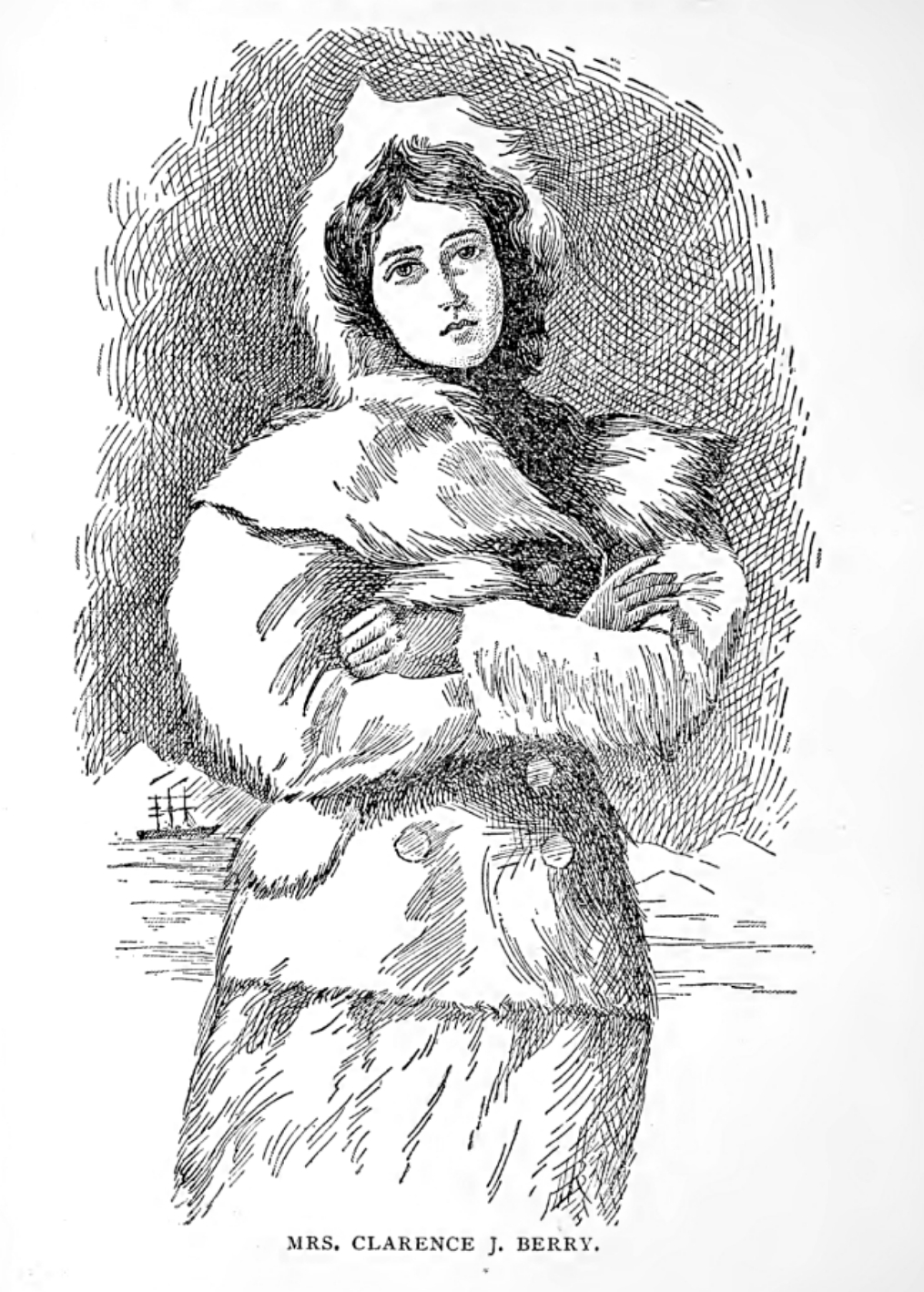

Ethel Bush Berry (1873-1948) was a successful Yukon gold miner and prominent female figure of the Klondike Gold Rush. Ethel and her husband Clarence Berry became millionaires from their mining claims on Eldorado Creek, and she was known throughout North America as "the Bride of the Klondike."

== Early life ==
Ethel Dean Bush was born in Canyon Creek, California, to Edward and Mary Ellen (née Pedlar) Bush, the second of five children. As a young girl, she spent her summers at the lumber mills of Canyon Creek, where her father worked, and most of her winters at her grandfather’s house in nearby Towle. Later, her family relocated to Fresno County, near Selma. According to her sister, Edna Alice Bush Berry, young Ethel was "quick, efficient, and good-natured and not lazy."

== Life in the Klondike ==
Ethel married Clarence J. Berry, informally known as C.J., at her family’s ranch house on March 10, 1896. For their honeymoon, they trekked via the Chilkoot Pass to Fortymile, where Clarence had prospected alone the previous year. According to her husband, Ethel ably faced any challenges they encountered en route, and "was never cross or complaining," despite the harsh conditions. In Fortymile, Ethel spent a lonely two months on her own while her husband mined in the surrounding area without much success. Their lucky break came when Clarence, tending bar at the local saloon, overheard George Carmack brag about his recent gold strike on Bonanza Creek. After Clarence had made a brief trip to the Klondike to stake a claim, the Berrys packed up their settlement in Fortymile and established themselves on No. 5 Eldorado Creek, which became one of the most productive gold-bearing claims in the Klondike.

After eighteen months in the Yukon, the Berrys returned to the United States on the Portland – a ship purported by American newspapers to contain one ton of Klondike gold, but which in actuality held at least two. Upon their arrival, Clarence, Ethel, and their fellow travellers were the objects of a media frenzy; the tale of Ethel's success was widely publicized, and her story is credited with inspiring other young women to make the trip North.

The following spring, Clarence left to return to their northern claims once again, but wrote to Ethel before his boat departed from Seattle to request that she and her younger sister, Edna, accompany him to the Yukon. The sisters obliged and joined up with Clarence and his eight-person party several days later. After outfitting the ladies with appropriate travelling attire, the entire group set off for the Klondike via the Inside Passage waterway and the Chilkoot Pass.

== Later life ==
After 1902, the Berrys also purchased claims and mined successfully in the Fairbanks and Ester Creek areas of Alaska. Later, they invested in oil exploration and founded the modern-day Berry Corporation.

Clarence J. Berry died in 1930, and Ethel, still wealthy, lived in Beverly Hills, California until she died in 1948.
