= GlassPoint Solar =

Solar steam generator

- Company type: Private
- Industry: Solar thermal energy
- Number of employees: 100-250
- Website: glasspoint.com

GlassPoint is a private company founded in 2009 that designs and manufactures solar steam generators which use solar thermal technology to generate steam for industrial processes.

== Overview ==
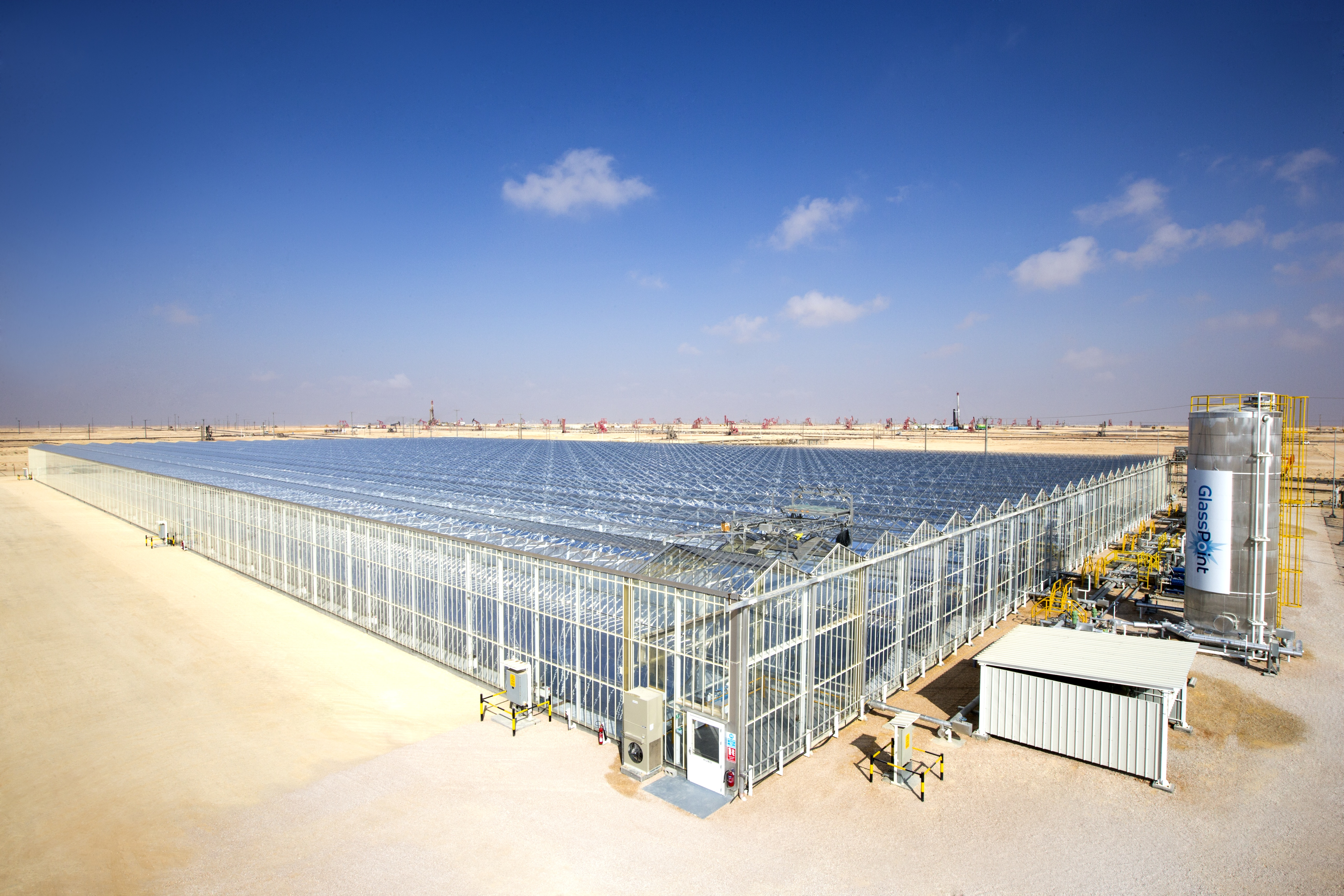
7MW Solar EOR project in Amal, Oman

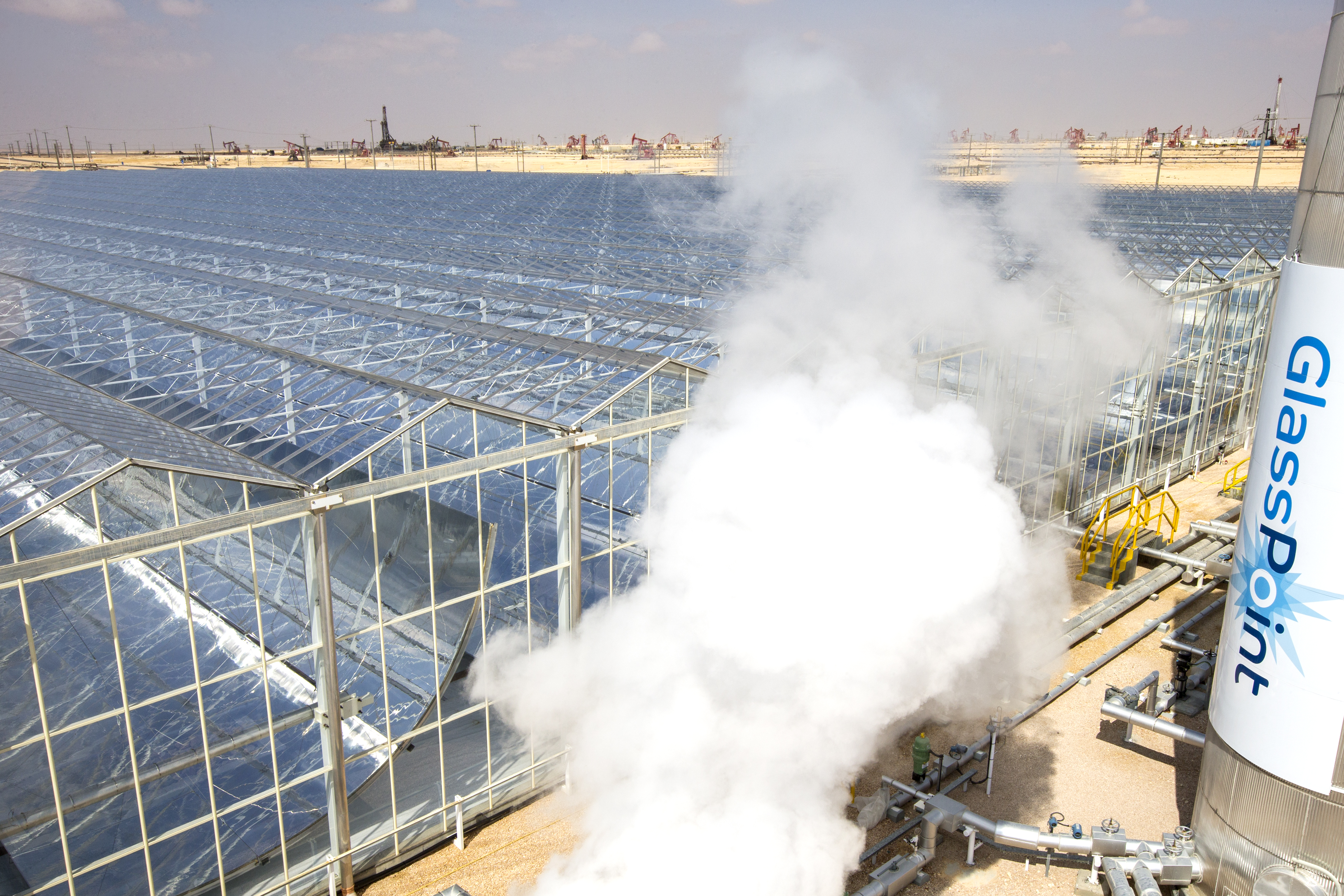
Generating steam for EOR using concentrated solar power

GlassPoint's enclosed trough technology encloses lightweight, trough-shaped mirrors with piping in a standard agricultural greenhouse, concentrating the sun's energy to create steam. By using the enclosed trough architecture, GlassPoint claims it can produce emission-free steam for two to three times less than competing concentrated solar power technologies, such as the power tower and linear fresnel. The company is based in New York City, with a global presence.

In December 2012, GlassPoint announced $26 million in Series B financing. Investors in the round included Royal Dutch Shell, RockPort Capital, Nth Power and Chrysalix Energy Venture Capital.

In September 2014, GlassPoint announced $53 million in Series C financing. Investors in the round included Royal Dutch Shell, State General Reserve Fund of Oman, RockPort Capital, Nth Power and Chrysalix Energy Venture Capital.

It was announced that GlassPoint was to be liquidated in May 2020, the company citing low and unpredictable oil and gas prices for the decision.

In June 2022, GlassPoint re-emerged under the leadership of the founding CEO, Rod MacGregor, adopting a new build-own-operate business model and unveiling an MOU for one of the largest solar projects in history with Saudi Arabian Mining Company (Ma’aden Group). GlassPoint announced it has moved to a “steam as a service” model to reduce up front risk and expanded its markets to include hard-to-abate industries producing materials essential to the energy transition, including mining, metals, and manufacturing.

== Projects ==
=== Berry Petroleum ===
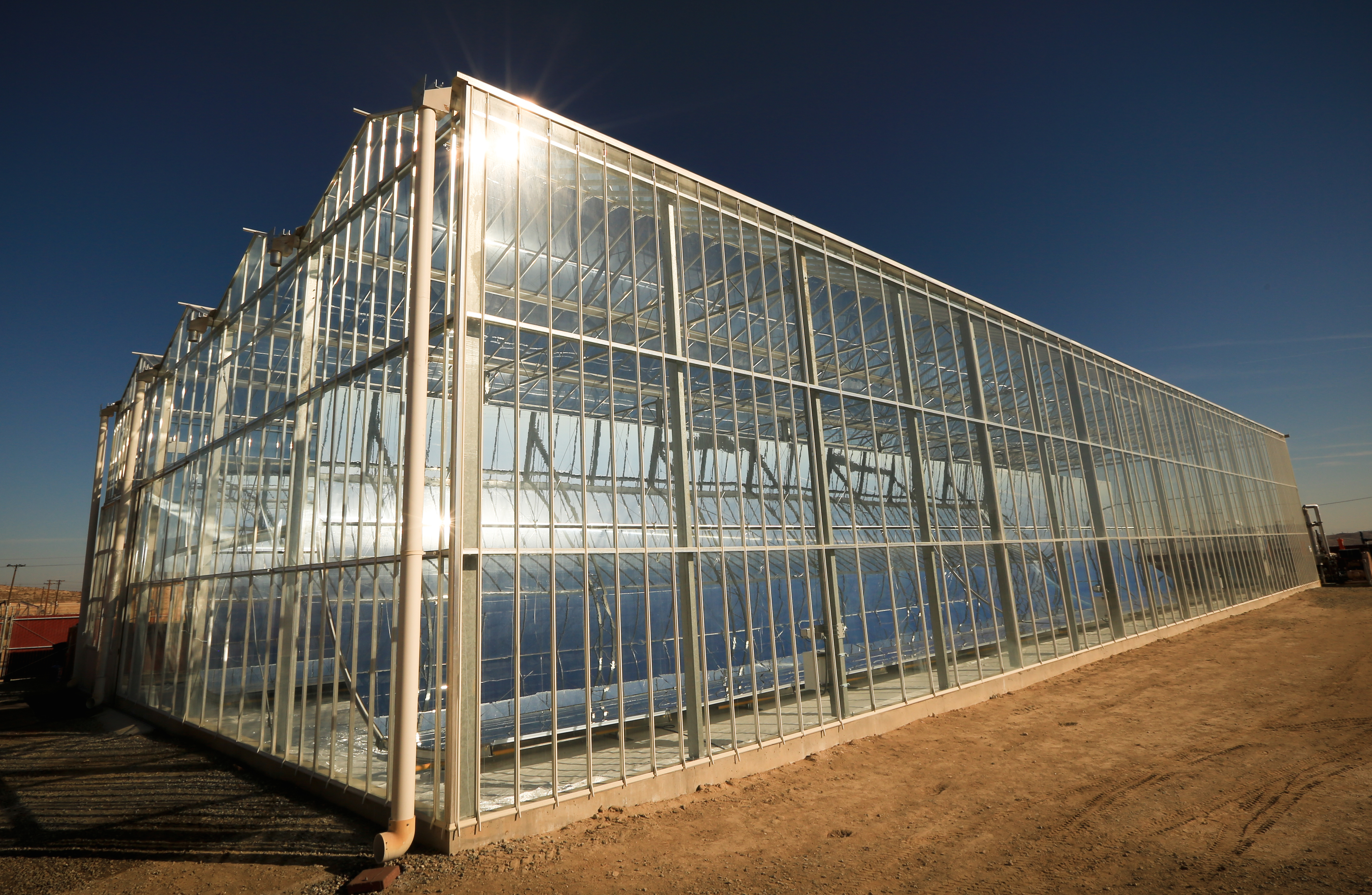
The world's first solar EOR project, operated by Berry Petroleum Company in Kern Country, CA, USA.

In 2011, GlassPoint deployed the world's first commercial solar enhanced oil recovery (solar EOR) project at an oilfield operated by Berry Petroleum in Kern County, California USA. Built in less than six weeks, the system uses the sun's radiant heat to produce approximately 1 million British Thermal Units (Btus) per hour of solar heat. GlassPoint partnered with local firms TJ Cross Engineers and PCL Industrial Services, as well as San Francisco based REM Design, to construct the system, which spans 7,000 square feet of land on the 100-year-old oilfield. The enclosed trough system preheats water to 190 °F used as feed water for Berry Petroleum's gas-fired steam generators.

=== Petroleum Development Oman ===
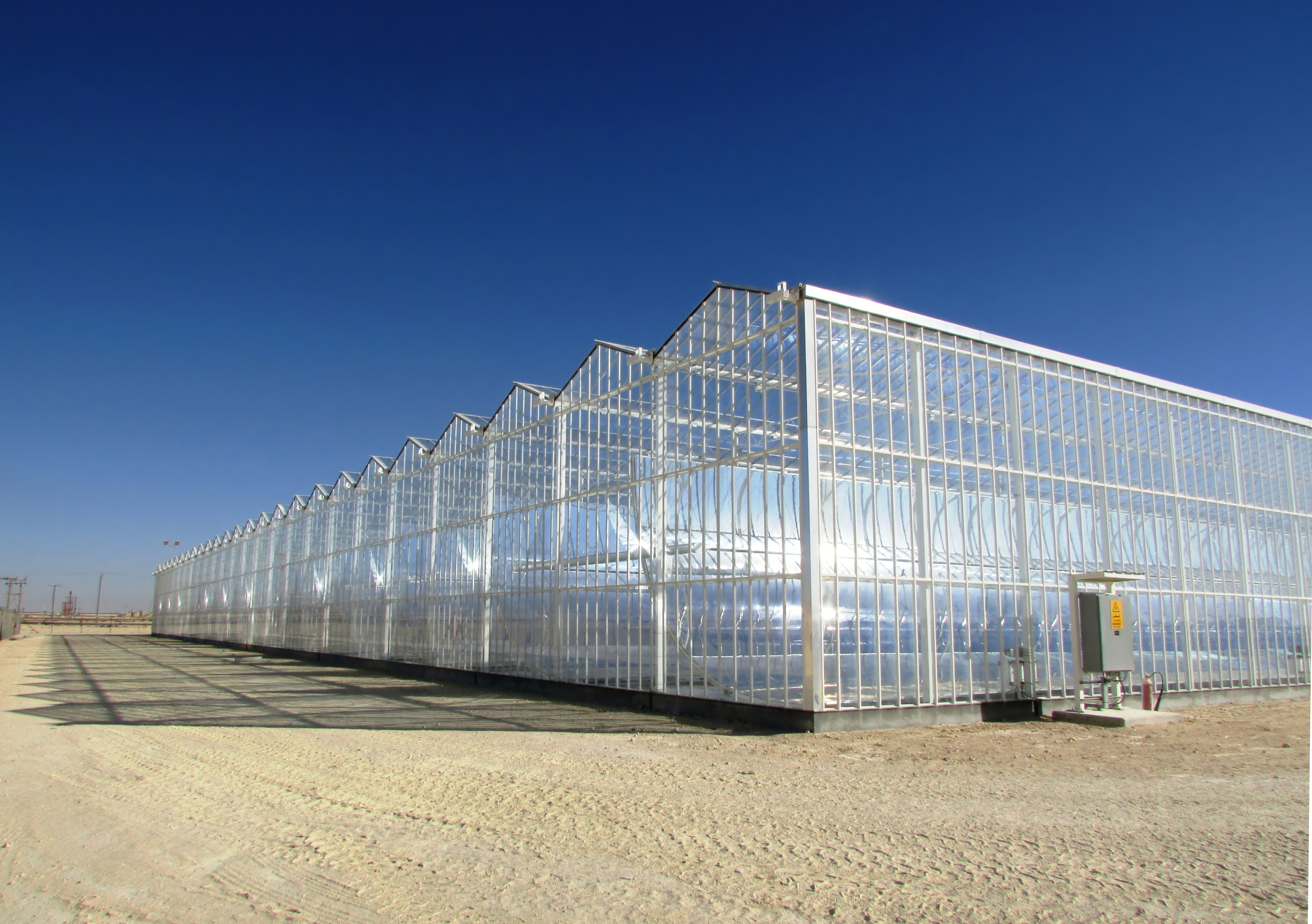
A solar enhanced oil recovery project commissioned by Petroleum Development Oman

In May 2013, GlassPoint commissioned the Middle East's first solar EOR project, a 7MW system developed in partnership with Petroleum Development Oman (PDO), the largest oil company in the Sultanate of Oman. The system produces an average of 50 tons of emissions-free steam daily. It has operated successfully for more than 4 years, generating an average of 50 tons of emissions-free steam per day that is fed directly into existing thermal EOR operations at PDO's Amal West oilfield.

The system was completed on time, on budget, and with no lost time or injuries demonstrating GlassPoint and PDO's shared commitment to health, safety, security and the environment (HSSE). During the first 12 months of operations, the actual performance of the GlassPoint system matched output models by a few percent and steam production continues to exceed contracted performance targets. The system recorded 98.6% uptime and maintained regular operations even during severe dust and sand storms. The automated roof-washing unit proved particularly effective in all weather events, restoring system performance overnight. The project served as a performance and operational baseline for larger steam generators in Oman and provided Petroleum Development Oman with valuable information for planning potential large-scale projects in the future.

In July 2015, Petroleum Development Oman and GlassPoint announced that they had signed an agreement to build a 1 GWth solar field of 1.8 km. The project, named Miraah, was designed to be the world's largest solar field measured by peak thermal capacity.

In August 2017, GlassPoint and its contractors crossed the threshold of 1.5 million man-hours worked without lost time injury (LTI) at Miraah.

In November 2017, GlassPoint and Petroleum Development Oman (PDO) completed construction on the first block of the Miraah solar plant safely on schedule and in line with budget and successfully delivered steam to the Amal West oilfield.

Today, the first 330 MWt at Miraah are operating and meeting all performance targets.

=== Additional solar EOR projects ===
In November 2017, Aera Energy and GlassPoint announced a joint project to create California's largest solar energy field. In November 2018, GlassPoint and Occidental Petroleum of Oman signed an agreement to cooperate on a solar thermal project to facilitate oil production on an oilfield in the Sultanate of Oman. Neither deal was completed due to financing issues.

=== Ma'aden Solar I ===
In June 2022, Glasspoint and Saudi Arabian Mining Company (Ma’aden Group) signed a Memorandum of Understanding ("MOU") to develop the world's largest solar process steam plant in Ras al Khair, Kingdom of Saudi Arabia.

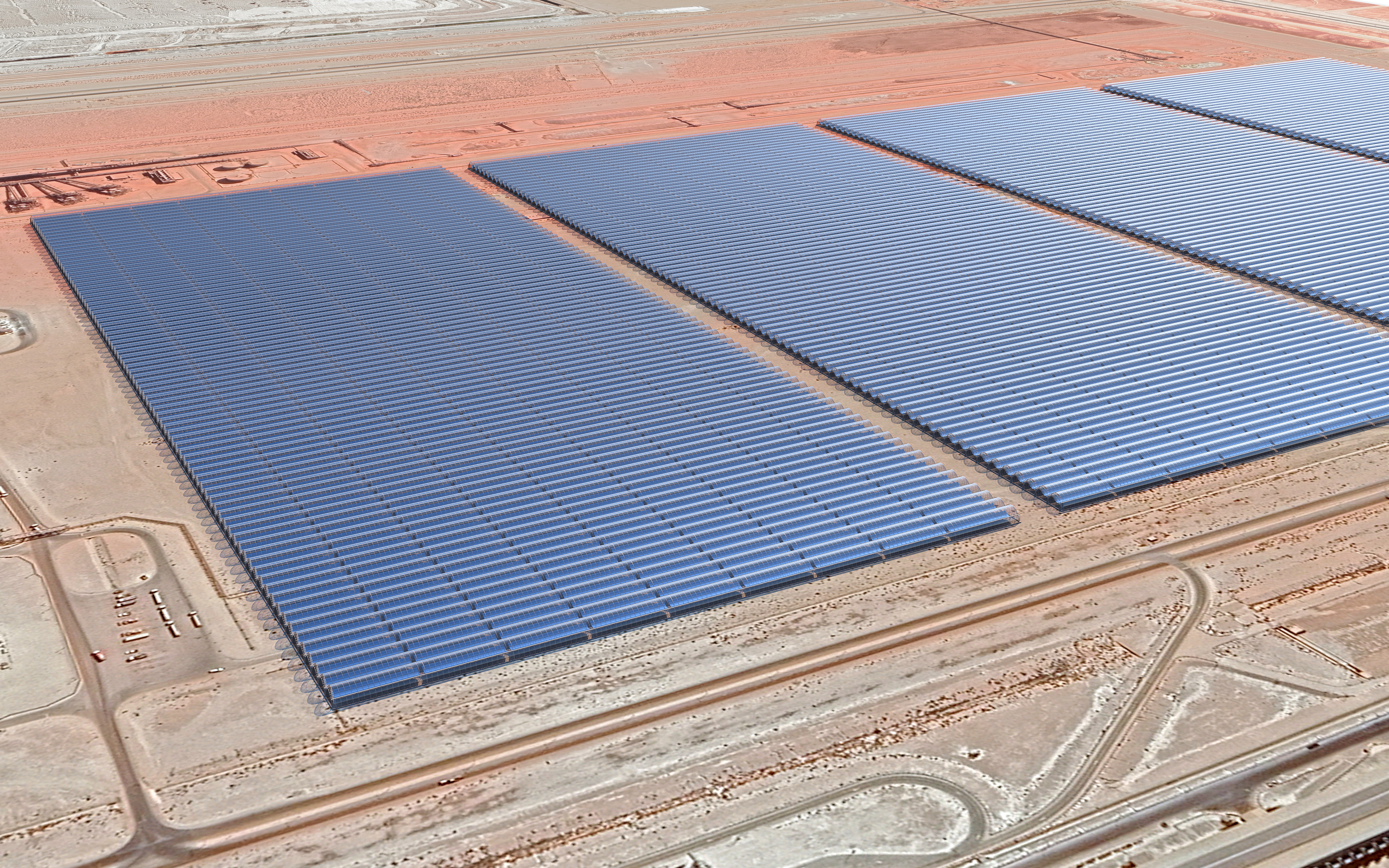
A rendering of the Ma’aden Solar I facility, which, when built, will be the world's largest solar process steam plant.

When complete, the 1,500 MWth facility will reduce Ma’aden’s carbon emissions by over 600,000 tons annually, nearly 4% of Ma'aden's overall carbon footprint, bringing the company closer to its mandate of carbon neutrality by 2050.

== Awards ==
- Platts Global Energy Awards 2011. Commercial Technology of the Year Award
- Oil & Gas Middle East Awards 2013. Enhanced Oil Recovery Award
- MEED Quality Awards 2014. Oman Sustainable Project of the Year
- MENASOL CSP Technology Innovation for MENA 2015
- Oil & Gas Middle East 2016. Best EOR Project of the Year
- SolarPACES 2016. Technology Innovation Award
- World Economic Forum 2016. Technology Pioneer
- Shell Upstream International 2016. Impact Award for Safety & Environment
- ADIPEC 2015. Best Oil & Gas Innovation or Technology
- MENASOL 2017. CSP Technology Innovation

== See also ==
- Concentrated solar power
- Enhanced oil recovery
- Low-carbon fuel standard
- Miraah
- Parabolic trough
- Petroleum Development Oman
- Solar thermal energy
- Solar thermal enhanced oil recovery
