= 1101 East Pike Street =

Building in Seattle, Washington, U.S.

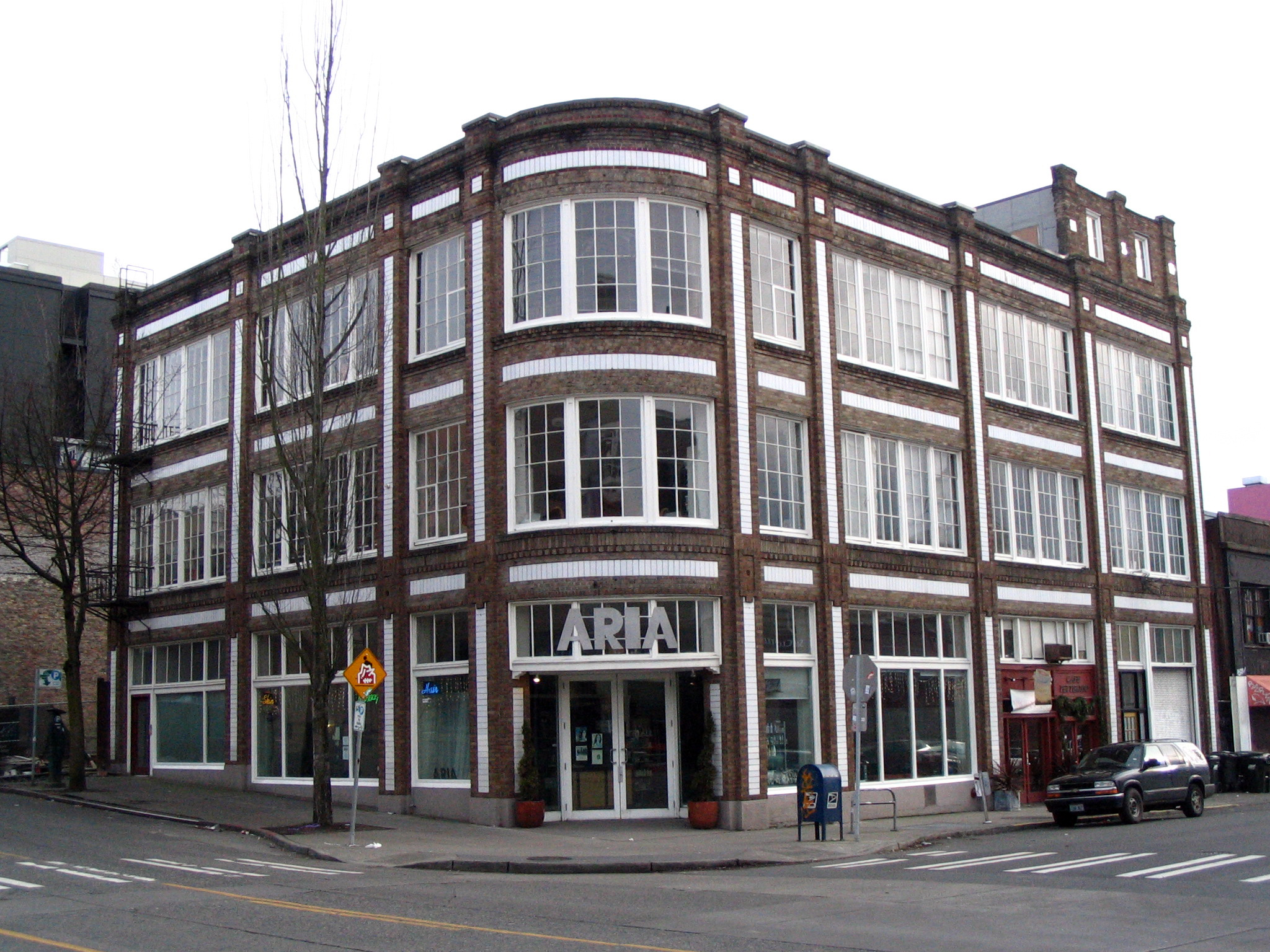
- The building's exterior in 2008
- Interactive map of the 1101 East Pike Street area

General information
- Coordinates: 47°36′50″N 122°19′4.5″W
- Construction started: 1915
- Completed: 1916
- Owner: Seattle Automobile Company

Technical details
- Floor count: 3

Design and construction
- Architect: Sønke Engelhart Sønnichsen

1101 East Pike Street, originally known as the Seattle Automobile Company and later the Baker Linen Building is a historic building in the Capitol Hill neighborhood of Seattle, in the U.S. state of Washington. Built in 1916 as the fourth and final location of the Seattle Automobile Company, the city's first auto dealer, the structure has been designated a city landmark.

== History ==
=== Seattle Automobile Company ===
The Seattle Automobile Company was organized by a group of local businessmen headed by Henry P. Grant (1876–1954) in 1904. Already a successful bicycle merchant in the city, Grant made Seattle's first car sale in 1902 and was given the opportunity to be the city's first official car salesman. Against the advice of everyone he knew, he signed on as regional distributor for the Franklin Automobile Company and Thomas Motor Company, whose line of motorized bikes Grant already dealt in. With the backing of several trustees including capitalist Thomas S. Lippy and the buyer of his first car, Dr. Frank Bryant, Grant set up shop in a rented storefront at 1407 Fourth Avenue in the heart of downtown. In his first year of business, he only managed to sell one car, but the next year would sell 10 and more each following year. He soon expanded his product, becoming the region's distributors of Locomobile, Peerless and Columbus cars and Knox trucks. Quickly outgrowing their space they began the march towards Capitol Hill, moving first to 1408 8th Avenue in 1906 and then to their own 36,000 square foot brick building at 1423 10th Avenue in June 1907, on a block containing some of Seattle's earliest purpose-built automobile garages. This building still stands today. By the end of 1907, high demand for the Franklin car prompted Grant to expand the garage into an adjoining building at 1422 Broadway and would soon open branch agencies in Tacoma, Olympia, Bellingham and Hoquiam, thus eliminating the need for customers to make the long journey into Seattle.

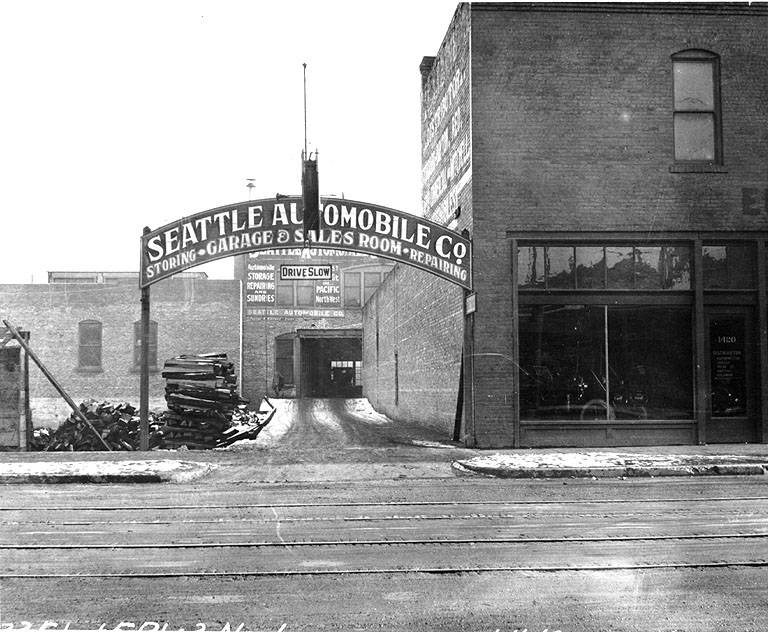
The 1422 Broadway entrance of the Seattle Auto Company, which occupied the building in the background from 1907 to 1916

By the early 1910s, the Seattle Auto Co. had shifted to distributing Stearns-Knight and the popular Maxwell car, which had replaced the Franklin as their flagship product. In February 1914, seeking to separate their sales department from their service department, they opened a new show room at the Southeast corner of Broadway and Pike Streets in a space recently vacated by the Lozier Motor Company, considered the nucleus of Seattle's auto row. With the Maxwell's sustained popularity the company continued to take on new models including the Premier and Chandler car and within a year they were in need of a new location to bring their operations back under one roof. In late 1915, Grant commissioned Norwegian-American architect Sønke Engelhart Sønnichsen to design a 3-story concrete and brick edifice for his newly acquired property at the Southeast corner of Pike Street and 11th Avenue, then occupied by a pair of cottages dating to Capitol Hill's first building boom just after the turn of the century. The $40,000 building was completed and occupied by the end of May 1916.

Faced in dark tapestry brick and accented with white glazed brick, the façade was originally illuminated between each floor by big neon signs displaying the Maxwell and Chandler logos. The ground floor contained the 64' x 40' show room, trimmed in white and red terrazzo, as well as the sales office and a small repair shop; a mezzanine above contained the offices of Grant and the salesmen and clerks, as well as a conference room and telephone exchange. The second floor contained the repair and parts departments and the third was used to display used and refurbished cars. The basement was used to store new Maxwell and Chandler cars and could hold up to 35. All floors were connected by a freight elevator located in the building's Southwest corner, the mechanical room of which extends that portion of the façade above the roofline.

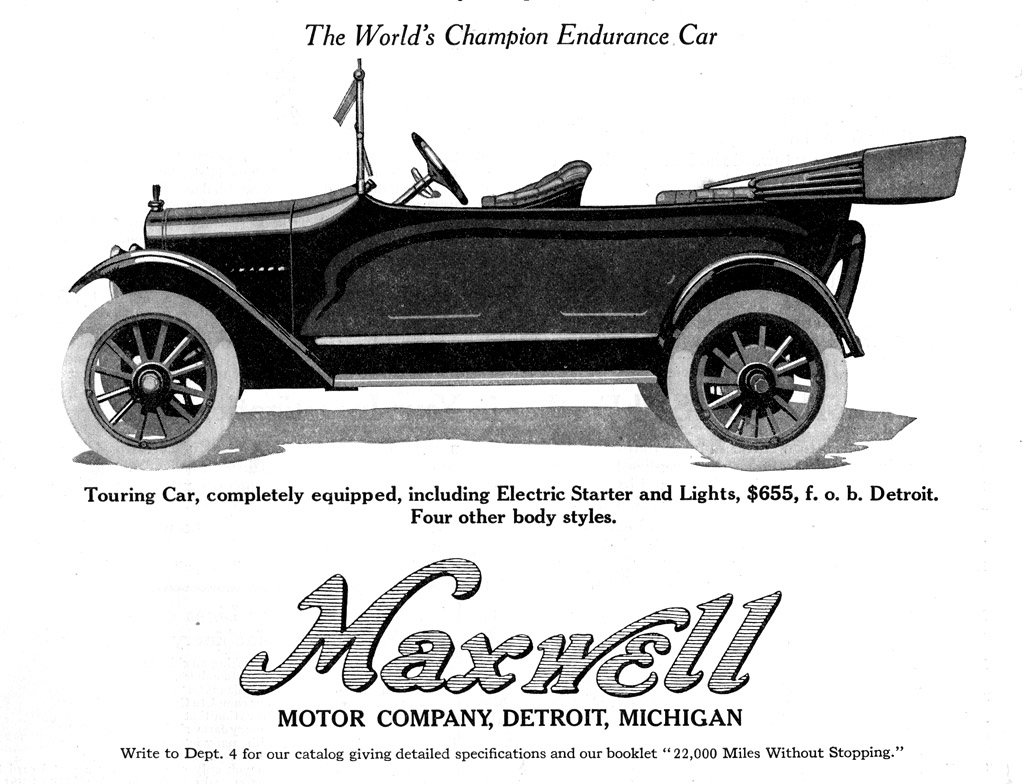
1916 advertisement for the Maxwell car, the most successful of the many brands sold by the Seattle Auto Co. throughout its history.

At 21,504 square feet, the Seattle Automobile Company's new building actually provided less floor space than their previous location. By the end of the decade the company employed 34 people and were selling 1,000 cars annually. With the addition of a truck department in 1917 and the exploding popularity of used cars during World War I an expansion was necessary. In March 1919, Grant purchased the 34' x 128' property to the south of his building at 1424 11th Avenue, announcing ambitious plans to build a 5-story annex, designed by him and architect Sønnichsen. These plans were quickly scaled back to a 2-story, $20,000 building which would house their parts department and used car business. This is now a separate building that is not landmarked.

During the 1920s, the company switched to selling the short-lived Flint and Cleveland cars, the latter a budget offshoot of the Chandler Company. Facing limited space with growing sales, they found themselves expanding into adjacent buildings much like at their old 10th Avenue location. In 1925, the used car department was relocated to 511 East Pike and the 1919 annex was connected through the rear to the building at 1425 12th Avenue. The company briefly sold the Moon Motor Car and its subsidiary the Diana during which time H. P. Grant retired from the company in 1926, with Sherman Bushnell becoming manager and Harry Harbaugh as president and treasurer. Under Bushnell, they would pivot again to distributing the Paige and down-market Jewett car and would soon take control of the Paige-Jewett's local assembly plant.

The Seattle Automobile Company quietly closed its doors around mid-1927; a new company by the same name would emerge in the University District selling Packards in the mid-1930s, owned by several members of the original organization.

=== Later years ===
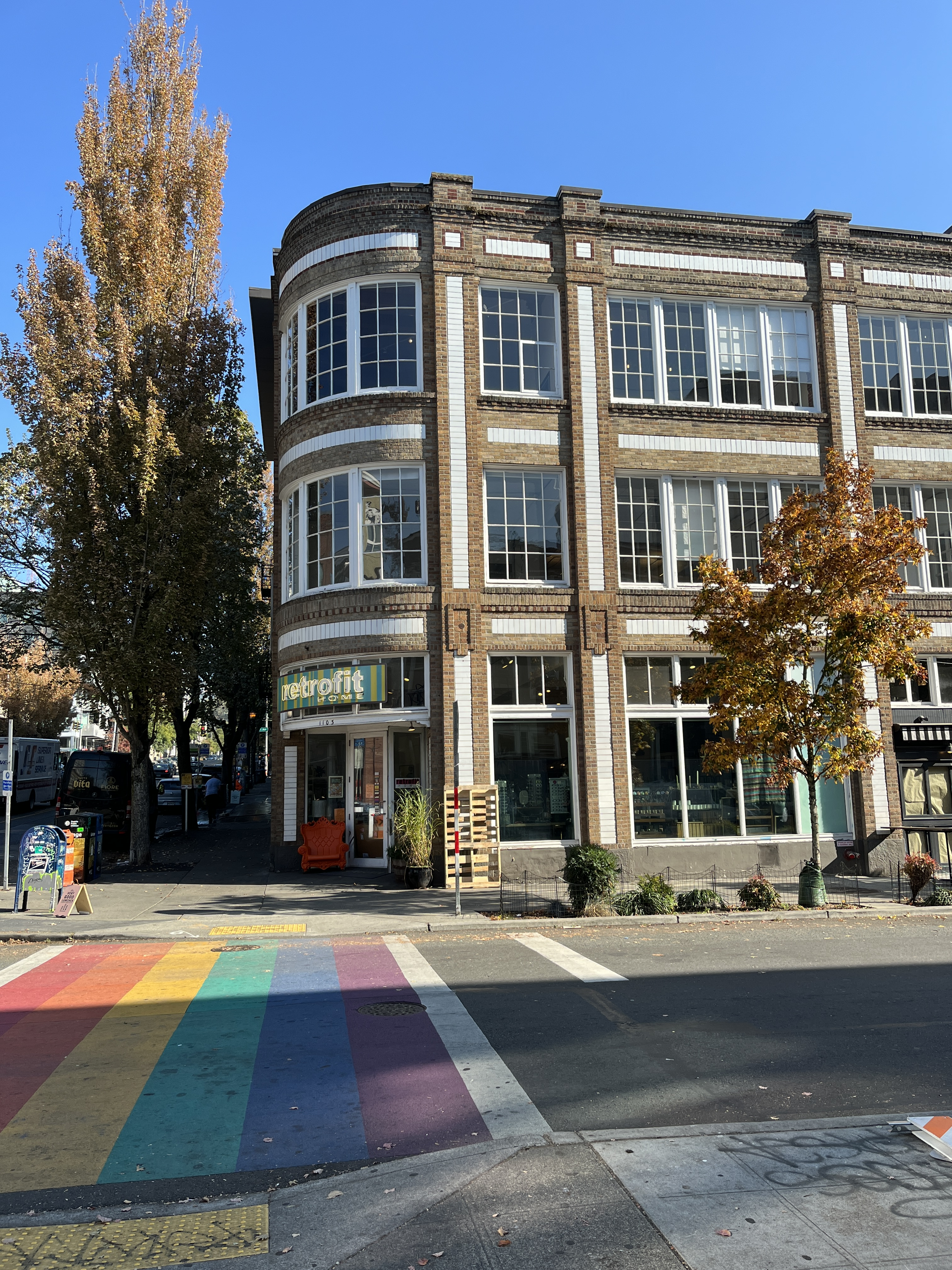
One of Capitol Hill's rainbow crossings in front of the building in 2022

After being vacated by its original tenant, 1101 East Pike was leased by the Wade Albee Motor Company, who exclusively sold used cars, as did their successor, the Lamping Motor Company. In June 1929, the building was leased by the Portland, Oregon-based P.J. Cronin Company, who distributed auto and radio accessories. After a fire almost destroyed the building in November 1933 they would not return.

By 1935, the building was refurbished and again selling used cars and later that decade, new Aladdin camper trailers. This would be the building's last automobile-related business. In the early 1940s, the building was home to Commercial Linen Company (a garment factory) and the Washington Training Center for the Blind, which taught sewing and basket weaving among other skills. After surviving another major fire in 1958, a series of linen and carpet stores would occupy the building into the 1970s, most notably the H. W. Baker Company, whose ghost sign is still partially visible on the building's south wall. The building is still commonly referred to as the Baker Linen Building despite its prior automobile history.

From the 1980s onward the building would be occupied by restaurants and office space as the neighborhood began to transition away from its industrial roots into a more trendy entertainment district. The ground floor is currently occupied by home decor store Retrofit and Café Pettirosso. The basement is currently the home of Cloud Studios, the spiritual successor to Chophouse Studios which had been located in the 1919 annex from 1984 until its conversion into apartments in the early 2010s.
