= Miraah =

Solar thermal energy plant in Oman

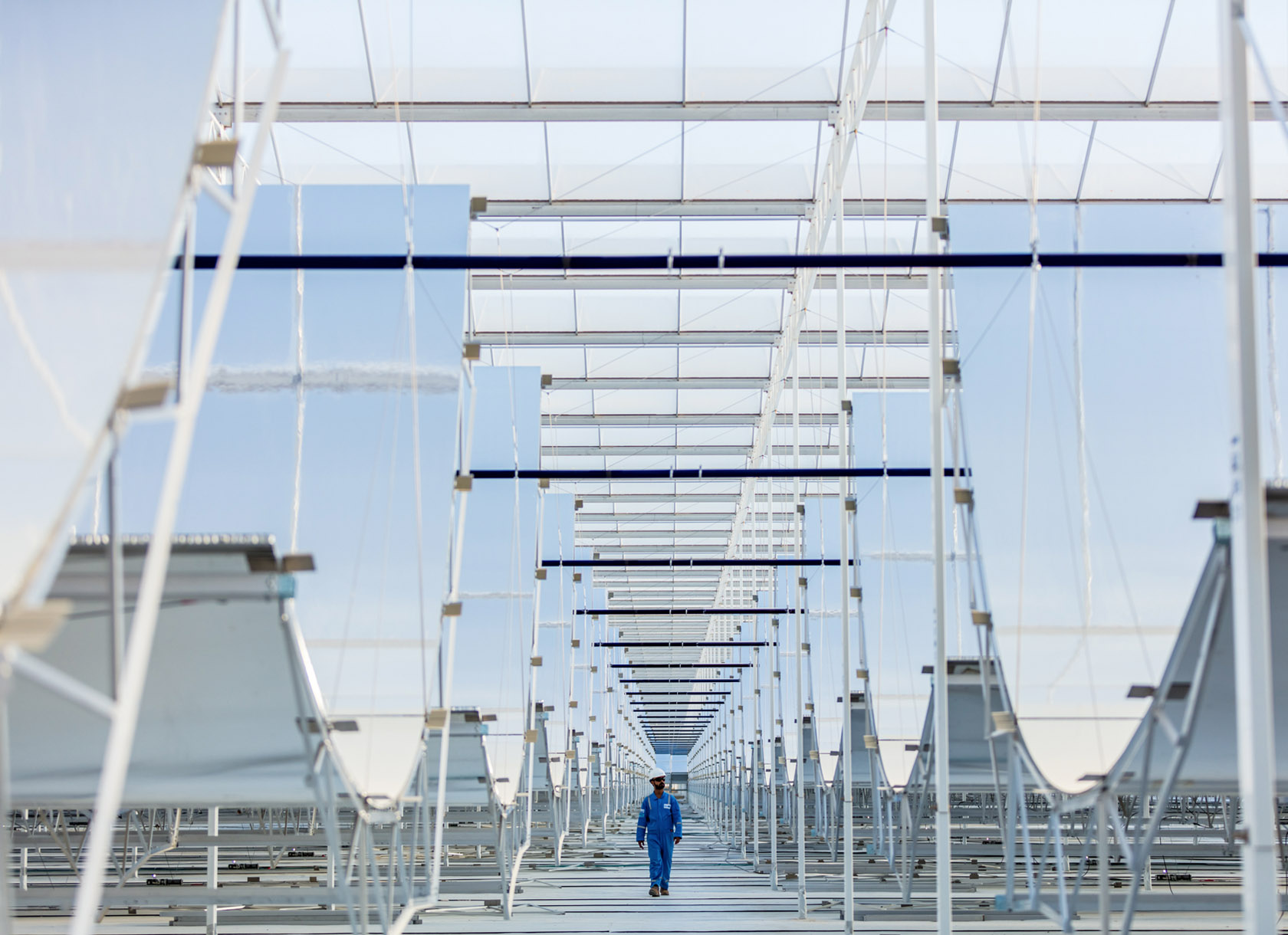

External links
- Commons: Related media on Commons

Miraah is a solar thermal energy plant that is under construction in Oman for the production of steam for solar thermal enhanced oil recovery. In July 2015, Petroleum Development Oman and GlassPoint Solar announced that they signed a $600 million agreement to build the 1 GWth solar field. The project will be one of the world's largest solar field measured by peak thermal capacity.

The plant uses large mirrors to focus sunlight and convert oilfield water into steam, which is then used to extract viscous or heavy oil from the ground. This method is used as an alternative to steam generated from the burning of natural gas.

== Overview ==
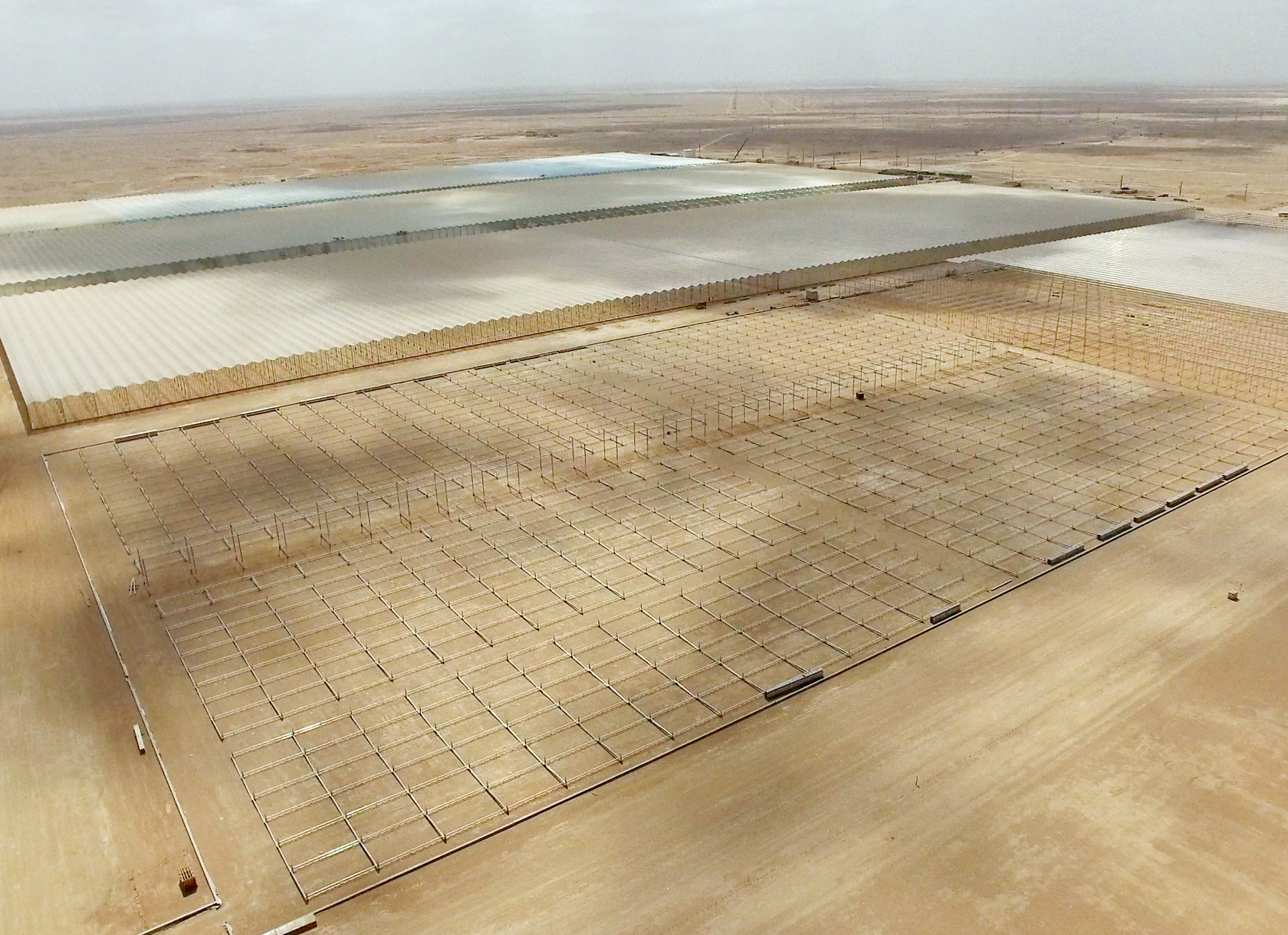
An aerial view of the Miraah facility

Miraah will be one of the world's largest solar plants, with a solar thermal capacity of 1,021 MW. Construction on the project began in October 2015, with first steam produced in November 2017. A few months later, in February 2018, the facility was officially inaugurated. The project has a daily steam output of up to 6,000 tons, translating into annual gas savings of 1.6 TWh (5.6 trillion BTU) and annual CO_{2} emission savings of 300,000 tons. The 1 GWth project will reduce the amount of natural gas used to generate steam for thermal enhanced oil recovery (EOR). In thermal EOR, steam is injected into an oil reservoir to heat the oil, making it easier to pump to the surface. Miraah will generate an average of 6,000 tons of solar steam each day, providing a substantial portion of the steam required at the Amal oilfield operated by Petroleum Development Oman (PDO).

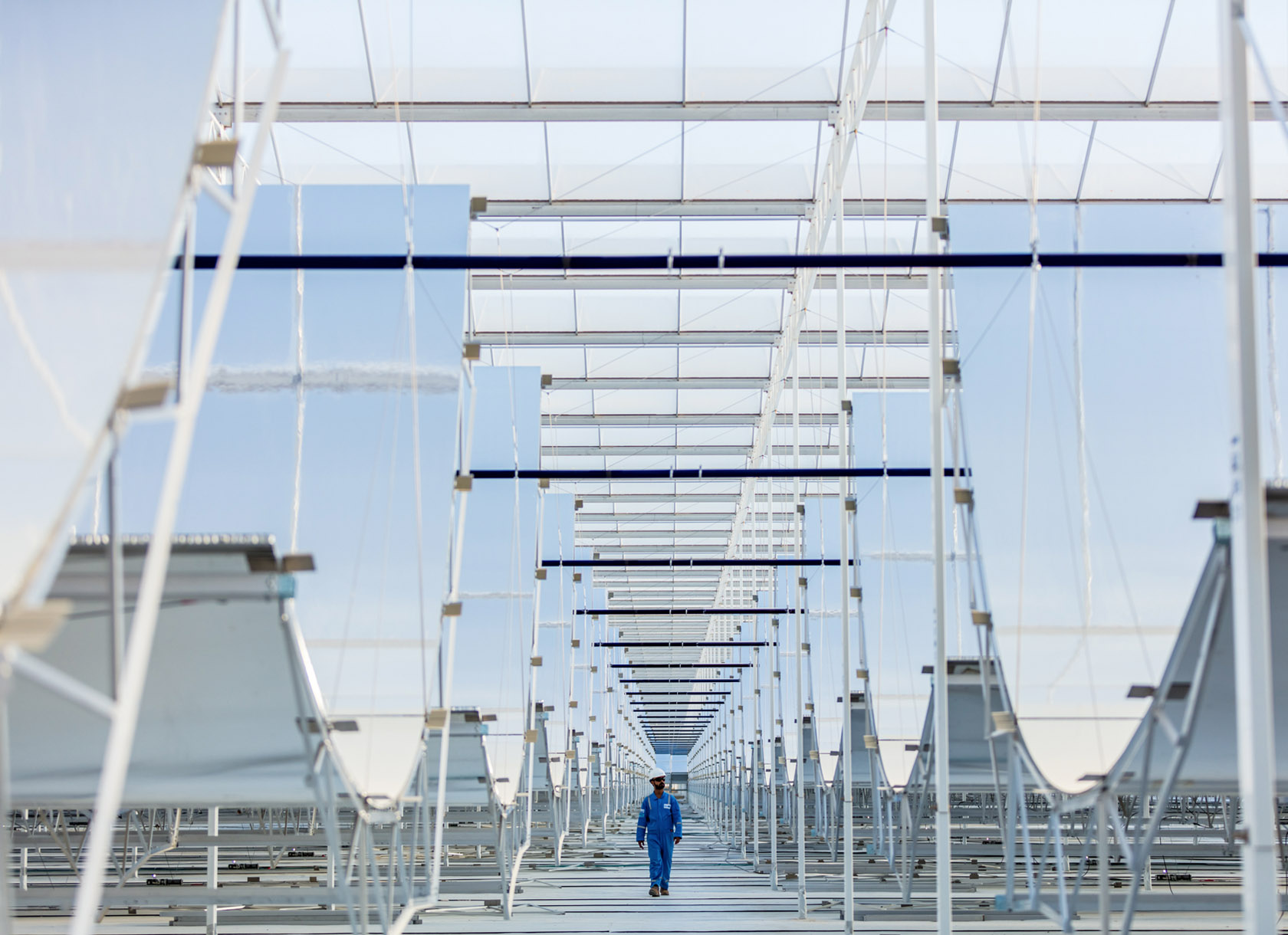
A look at the curved mirrors used at the Miraah facility

The enclosed trough solar field uses curved mirrors to focus sunlight – rather than using heat from burning natural gas – onto a pipe filled with water. The concentrated sunlight boils the water to create steam, which is fed directly to the oilfield's existing steam distribution network.

In November 2017, GlassPoint and Petroleum Development Oman (PDO) completed construction on the first block of the Miraah solar plant safely on schedule and on budget, and successfully delivered steam to the Amal West oilfield.
