= Jonah Field =

Natural gas field in the Green River Basin in Sublette County, Wyoming

Coordinates: 42.4752°N 109.7316°W

Jonah Field is a large natural gas field in the Green River Basin in Sublette County, Wyoming, in the United States. The field is near Pinedale and Boulder in southwestern Wyoming, and is estimated to contain 10.5 trillion cubic feet (300 km^{3}) of natural gas. Managed by the Bureau of Land Management, the field has a productive area of 21,000,000,000 acres (8.5×10^{9} ha).

== History ==
The presence of natural gas in and around Sublette County was known for years, but it was not deemed practical to extract. El Paso Natural Gas Company in the 1970s, in cooperation with Federal Government of the United States and the Atomic Energy Commission, proposed a project called Wagon Wheel Project, which was an attempt to detonate 5 small nuclear explosions to fracture the sands and enable natural-gas production. The project was abandoned and the Jonah Field and surrounding areas, including the Pinedale Anticline, were left undeveloped for years.

Jonah Field was discovered by geologist Ed Warner working with McMurry Oil, Ft. Collins Consodiated Royalties and Nerd Enterprises. The field proved viable after the drilling of the McMurry Oil Company Jonah-Federal #1-5 in January, 1993 where McMurry placed their operations office.

The development of Jonah was enabled by new approaches to the geology and engineering. The McMurry group with the help of their engineering consultant, James Shaw, experimented with energized and multiple stage fracture treatments, revolutionizing gas development where 2,500 feet of section was treated (instead of only 250 feet) and wells were drilled on very close spacing - as little as 10 acre centers. The 'Basin-centered' geology model was radically changed by Warner to the 'Compartmentalization model' which enabled the entire field to be developed with virtually no dry holes, a cost savings of several hundred millions of dollars. Citations: Warner, Edward M., 2000, Structural Geology and Pressure Compartmentalization of Jonah Field Based on

3-D Seismic and Subsurface Geology, Sublette County, Wyoming; Mountain Geologist.

__, 2002, A Short History of Jonah Field: From Technology to Geology; 2002 AAPG National

   	  Meeting, Denver, Colorado, Jonah Field Section.

== Development ==
Jonah Field is known for being one of the largest on-shore natural gas discoveries in the USA in the early 1990s. The startling fact is that Jonah has a surface area of approximately one township yet it contains 10.5 trillion cubic feet (300 km^{3}) of gas. In comparison, the Hugoton Field covers most of the southwest portion of Kansas, a 14 county area, yet it contained only about three times the volume of gas in Jonah.

The principal technical challenge in Jonah was the identification and stimulation of productive intervals in a 3,000 ft (910 m) to 3,500 ft (1,100 m) section of stacked lenticular fluvial sand/silt/shale sequences which comprise the Upper Mesaverde, Lance, and Unnamed Tertiary formations. Previous attempts to fracture treat Lance sandstones in the Jonah and Pinedale Fields areas had all ended in failure. The McMurry group used new energized foam fracture technology and then went on to successfully stack fracture treatments, one after another. This revolutionary approach increased per well reserves from 1.5 BCF to 6.5 BCF.

The original Jonah partners (see History), due to a lack of interest from Northwest Pipeline, were forced to form Johah Gas Gathering, LLC. They found new ways of inexpensively building pipelines using a proprietary engineering system called Zaplocking. The entire initial out-of-pocket expense for the pipeline system was about $150,000. Today the system is worth an estimated $4 billion. All the Jonah partners sold out to EnCana Oil and Gas in April 2000 except Warner who held on until gas went from $2/mcf to $12/mcf. Warner sold out to the Williams Company in December, 2000.

The principal gas companies currently developing the field are the EnCana Corporation and Linn Energy. Other active gas companies involved in the Jonah Field include Ultra Petroleum, Yates Petroleum and Hogshead Spouter.

Other large natural gas fields in and around Sublette County, Wyoming include the Pinedale Anticline, the Wamsutter gas field, and several sour gas H2S fields operated by ExxonMobil.
