= Berry Corporation =

American petroleum company

- Company type: Public
- Traded as: Nasdaq: BRY; Russell 2000 Index component
- Industry: Petroleum industry
- Founded: 1909; 117 years ago
- Founder: Clarence Berry
- Headquarters: Dallas, TX
- Key people: Fernando Araujo (CEO)
- Products: Petroleum; Natural gas; Natural gas liquids
- Production output: 27.4 thousand barrels of oil equivalent (168,000 GJ) per day (2021)
- Revenue: ▲$544 million (2021)
- Net income: ▲ -$15 million (2021)
- Total assets: ▲$1.456 billion (2021)
- Total equity: ▼$692 million (2021)
- Number of employees: 1,224 (2021)
- Website: bry.com

Berry Corporation is a company primarily engaged in hydrocarbon exploration in California (78% of 2019 production), the Uintah Basin (17% of 2019 production), and the Piceance Basin (5% of 2019 production). As of December 31, 2021, the company had 97 million barrels of oil equivalent (590,000,000 GJ) of estimated proved reserves, of which 87% was petroleum and 13% was natural gas. The company also offers oil well services and electricity sales.

== History ==
The company was founded in 1909 by Clarence Berry in California.

In August 1996, the company acquired Tannehill Oil and its affiliates for $25.2 million.

In 2003, the company acquired properties in the Uintah Basin in northwestern Utah.

In February 2013, Linn Energy acquired the company for $4.3 billion, including $2.5 billion in stock.

In February 2017, Linn Energy completed a financial restructure that included the corporate spin-off of Berry into a separate company.

In July 2018, the company became a public company via an initial public offering.

=== 1993 oil spill ===
In December 1993, an oil pipeline owned by the company leaked, resulting in a spill of 84,000 gallons of heavy crude oil into McGrath Lake, near Oxnard, California. Berry had acquired the 40-year-old pipeline from Chevron Corporation in 1990 after it had been abandoned for 10 years. The line had been used to transport natural gas, Berry began to pump crude oil through it without making any upgrades. Ten months before the oil spill occurred, a safety valve that might have prevented the leak had broken and was not repaired. In August 1994, Berry agreed to pay $600,000 and pleaded no contest to a single misdemeanor charge of failing to report the leak. In addition, the foreman on duty during the spill pleaded no contest to a charge of illegally releasing oil into marine water and was ordered to perform 320 hours of beach cleanup. The civil case from the state attorney general's office was settled in January 1997, when the company agreed to a $3.2 million fine.
