= Clarence Berry =

American businessman

Clarence Jesse Berry (1867–1930), known as C.J., was an American businessman and successful gold miner in the Klondike Gold Rush. He and his wife, Ethel Berry, made a further fortune in Ester, Alaska, in 1902, and founded several oil companies over the years, which eventually became Berry Corporation.

In Ester, Berry pioneered the use of the cold water point and the steam point, used to thaw frozen soil and permafrost in a safer manner for drift mining than boring shafts using hot rocks or underground fires, which rendered the excavations and tunnels far more susceptible to collapse. The Berrys operated No. 8 Below Discovery Claim.

== Early life ==
Berry Park in Selma, California, is named for Berry, who was a struggling fruit farmer in that San Joaquin Valley town before he traveled to the Klondike. He was a son of a forty-niner. Clarence went to Yukon, Alaska in 1894 in search of gold after his fruit farming venture failed in California. During his first year in Alaska, CJ learned from local natives on how to survive in the hostile environment. It was a very difficult year for CJ during the winter of 1894/95, as he got trapped deep into the Forty Mile Creek area and had only beans to eat for two months. The multitude of hardships working a mining operation solo were extensive. After a long day of hard labor, his cabin would have to be heated with chopped wood and water melted for drinking and cooking.

CJ returned to Selma in 1895 and married his childhood sweetheart Ethel Bush in 1896. The newlyweds and CJ's brother Fred returned to Alaska for the honeymoon. Ethel Berry was one of the earliest white women to cross the Chilkoot Pass, although the distinction of the first female crossing is thought to belong to Dutch Kate, in 1888. The honeymooners settled in at the Forty Mile Creek outpost on the Yukon River. To make ends meet as looked for gold, CJ got a job as the local bartender.

== The Klondike Gold Rush ==
In the summer of 1896, George Carmack walked into the Bill McPhee's Saloon and informed CJ that he discovered gold in the Klondike and paid for his drink with gold nuggets. CJ felt Carmack's story was credible and left immediately with his brother Fred to stake claims. CJ and Fred, staying very close to shore in their small boat, pushed themselves upriver with "poles" slowly but surely against the mighty Yukon River current. It was hard work, but the Berry brothers made the 50-mile (80 km) journey upstream to the claims within a few days.

They both staked claims on Rabbit Creek, which quickly became known as Bonanza Creek and later traded a half interest in that claim for half of Anton Stander's claim on Eldorado Creek. They each explored their claims, digging to approximately 20 feet (6.1 m) deep through the permafrost with some luck. These claims were sold, as they found no significant amount of gold. (A hundred years later, these stakes are still being mined, with the payzone being 60 feet (18 m) deep.)

CJ traded half of his claim on Bonanza Creek for a half claim on Little Rabbit Creek, which later became known as El Dorado Creek. They built a small cabin. Ethyl took care of heating the cabin and cleaning and cooking for the men. CJ and Fred gathered firewood and built large fires to melt the permafrost, allowing them to dig 6 inches (150 mm) deeper each day. Fred and Clarence would chop a tree down uphill and "ride" it into camp. Clarence dug his own pit on the upper left side and Fred had a hole on the upper right of their half claim. (A claim was 500 feet (150 m) long, measured with a rope and later resurveyed.) Shoring the holes was not necessary, as the frozen ground was structurally sound. The gold became more abundant the deeper they went. When they got 30 feet (9.1 m) down, they were astounded. They had reached a payzone several feet thick of black sand containing gold, with every shovel full being worth hundreds of dollars (gold at $16.00 an ounce) Champion pans paid more than $500.00 per pan.

CJ and Fred were savvy businessmen; they managed to acquire two adjacent claims on the El Dorado before word got out about the riches beneath. CJ left a bucket of gold nuggets and a bottle of whiskey outside his cabin with a note saying "help yourself". Immediately, CJ sent for his former fruit farm workers. About a dozen of his workers arrived from Selma in 1897. They were trusted workers and well compensated at an ounce of gold daily. Clarence called his workers "Selmanites".

On July 17, 1897, CJ and Ethyl Berry and other successful miners arrived in Seattle aboard the SS Portland, the first ship to put into the port with tangible proof of the riches of the Klondike. One newspaperman from the Seattle Post-Intelligencer (with more interest in grabbing his readers' attention than fact finding) reported the Portland carried a "ton of gold"; as it turned out, it was two tons. CJ's story and picture was on the front page of the Seattle and San Francisco newspapers. A worldwide gold rush ensued. In later years, CJ and his three brothers (Fred, Henry and Frank) worked as a team, alternating six month shifts at the northern mining camps.

CJ went on to acquiring prolific mining claims in Ester, Alaska, near Fairbanks, and a mine in the Circle District called "Berry Camp".

== Oil and later life ==
In 1909, CJ purchased several sections of land in Maricopa near Taft, California, which became known as Berry Holding Company. In 1926, CJ's oil producing properties in Mexico were expropriated and Algur H. Meadows, Henry W. Peters and Ralph G. Trippett took over. Berry Corporation was formed, and eventually went public on the New York Stock Exchange under the ticker symbol BRY in 1985. Berry produced its 100 millionth barrel of oil in 1996.

Clarence's brother Henry later owned two professional baseball teams in the Pacific Coast League, including the San Francisco Seals, for many years.

In 1996, CJ Berry was inducted into the Mining Hall of Fame located in Leadville, Colorado.
