= List of airports in Iran =

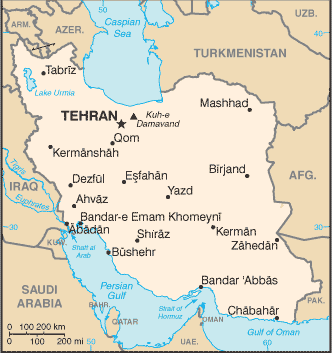
Map of Iran

This is a list of airports in Iran, grouped by type and sorted by location.

As of 2013, Iran had 319 airports which made Iran the 22nd country in the world with most airports.

Iran, officially the Islamic Republic of Iran, is a country in Central Eurasia and/or West Asia. It is bordered on the north by Armenia, Azerbaijan, the Caspian Sea and Turkmenistan, on the east by Afghanistan and Pakistan, on the south by the Gulf of Oman and the Persian Gulf, on the west by Iraq and on the northwest by Turkey. The country's largest and capital city is Tehran.

== Air travel in Iran ==
Domestic flight tickets in Iran are generally affordable, typically priced between US$10 and US$20, but may increase during high-demand periods such as Nowruz (Persian New Year) and summer holidays. Regulated fare practices have long been in place, although discussions about liberalizing prices have prompted debate within the aviation industry. The domestic fleet mainly consists of aircraft such as the McDonnell-Douglas MD-80, ATR 72, and Fokker 100, which support cost-effective short- and mid-range routes.

== Airports ==
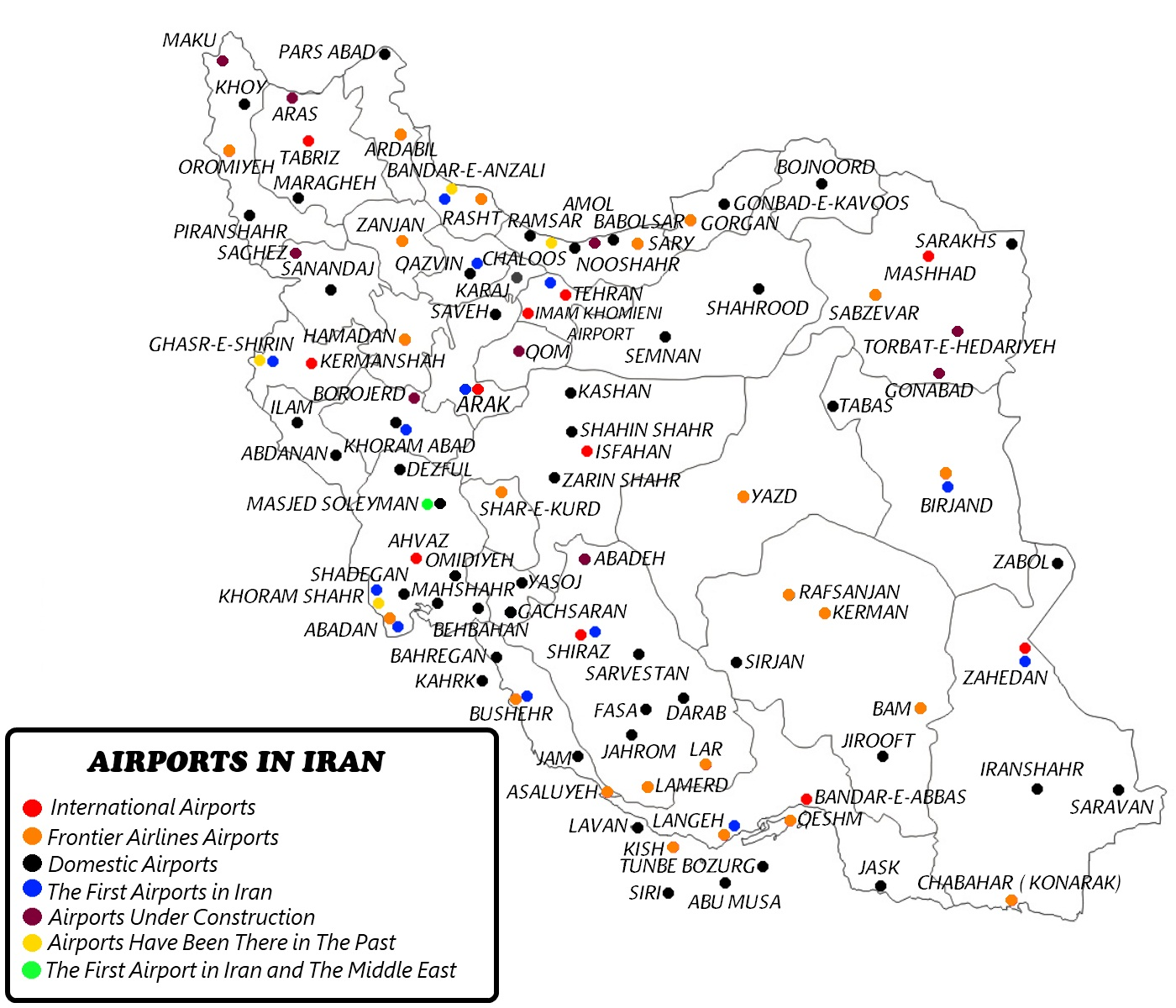
Map of airports in Iran

Airport names shown in bold have scheduled passenger service on commercial airlines.

Location served	ICAO	IATA	Airport name
**Public airports**
Abadan	OIAA	ABD	**Ayatollah Jami International Airport**
Abadeh	OISA		Abadeh Airport
Abdanan	OICD		Abdanan Airport
Abu Musa Island	OIBA	AEU	**Abu Musa Airport**
Aghajari	OIAG	AKW	**Aghajari Airport**
Ahvaz	OIAW	AWZ	**Lieutenant General Qasem Soleimani International Airport**
Arak	OIHR	AJK	**Arak International Airport**
Ardabil	OITL	ADU	**Ardabil Airport**
Asalouyeh	OIBP	PGU	**Persian Gulf Airport** (Khalije Fars Airport)
Babolsar or Babol	OINB		Babolsar Airport or Babol Airport
Bahregan	OIBH	IAQ	**Bahregan Airport**
Bam	OIKM	BXR	**Bam Airport**
Bandar Abbas	OIKB	BND	**Bandar Abbas International Airport**
Bandar Abbas	OIKP	HDR	Havadarya Airport
Bandar Lengeh	OIBL	BDH	**Bandar Lengeh Airport**
Behbahan	OIAE		Behbahan Airport
Birjand	OIMB	XBJ	**Birjand International Airport**
Bojnord	OIMN	BJB	**Bojnord Airport**
Bushehr	OIBB	BUZ	**Bushehr Airport**
Chabahar	OIZC	ZBR	**Chabahar/Konarak International Airport**
Darab	OISD		Darab Airport
Dezful	OIAD	DEF	**Dezful Airport**
Dogonbadan (Gachsaran)	OIAH	GCH	**Gachsaran Airport**
Ella, Khuzestan Province			Ella North Airport
Eyvanki	OIIB		Boland Parvaz Airport
Fasa	OISF	FAZ	Fasa Airport
Firuzabad	OISZ		Firouzabad Airport
Garmsar	OIIR		Garmsar Airport
Gonbad-e Kavus/Hajji Balkhan			Gonbad-e Kavus Airport
Gorgan	OING	GBT	**Gorgan International Airport**
Hamadan	OIHH	HDM	**Hamadan International Airport**
Ilam	OICI	IIL	**Ilam Airport**
Iranshahr	OIZI	IHR	**Iranshahr Airport**
Isfahan	OIFM	IFN	**Isfahan International Airport** (Shahid Beheshti International)
Jahrom	OISJ	JAR	**Jahrom International Airport**
Jask	OIZJ	JSK	**Jask Airport**
Jiroft	OIKJ	JYR	**Jiroft Airport**
Kalaleh	OINE	KLM	**Kalaleh Airport**
Kangan	OIBJ	KNR	Jam Airport
Karaj	OIIP	PYK	Payam Airport
Kashan	OIFK	KKS	Kashan Airport
Kashmar	OIMQ		Kashmar UltraLight Airport
Kerman	OIKK	KER	**Ayatollah Hashemi Rafsanjani Airport**
Kermanshah	OICC	KSH	**Shahid Ashrafi Esfahani Airport**
Piranshahr (Khaneh)	OITH	KHA	Khaneh Airport
Khar Rud			Khar Rud Airport
Kharg Island	OIBQ	KHK	**Kharg Airport**
Khorramabad	OICK	KHD	**Khorramabad International Airport**
Khoy	OITK	KHY	**Khoy Airport**
Kish Island	OIBK	KIH	**Kish International Airport**
Lamerd	OISR	LFM	**Lamerd International Airport**
Larestan	OISL	LRR	**Larestan International Airport**
Lavan Island	OIBV	LVP	**Lavan Airport**
Mahmudabad (Eşfahān Province)			Mahmudabad (Eşfahān) Airport
Mahshahr	OIAM	MRX	**Mahshahr Airport**
Maku	OITU	IMQ	**Maku International Airport**
Bonab	OITM	ACP	**Sahand Airport**
Mashhad	OIMG		Golbahar Airport
Mashhad	OIMM	MHD	**Mashhad International Airport** (Shahid Hashemi Nejad Airport)
Masjed Soleyman	OIAI		Shahid Asyaee Airport
Mehriz	OIYR		Imam Reza Airport
Mehtar Kalateh			Mehtar Kalateh Airport
Noshahr	OINN	NSH	**Noshahr Airport**
Parsabad	OITP	PFQ	**Parsabad-Moghan Airport**
Qazvin (Ghazvin)	OIIK	GZW	Qazvin Airport
Qazvin (Ghazvin)	OIIA		Qazvin-Azadi Airport
Qeshm	OIKQ	GSM	**Qeshm International Airport**
Qom Province	OIIC		Kushke Nosrat Airport
Qom	OIIQ		Qom International Airport (under construction)
Rafsanjan	OIKR	RJN	**Rafsanjan Airport**
Ramsar / Tonekabon	OINR	RZR	**Ramsar International Airport**
Rasht	OIGG	RAS	**Rasht Airport** (Sardar Jangal Airport)
Sabzevar	OIMS	AFZ	**Sabzevar Airport**
Sanandaj	OICS	SDG	**Sanandaj Airport**
Saqqez	OICZ	TQZ	**Saqqez Airport**
Sarakhs	OIMC	CKT	**Sarakhs Airport**
Saravan	OIZS		**Saravan Airport**
Sari	OINZ	SRY	**Dasht-e Naz Airport**
Sarvestan			Sarvestan Airport
Semnan	OIIS	SNX	Semnan Municipal Airport
Shadegan			Shadegan Airport
Eslamabad-e Gharb (Shahabad)			Shahabad Highway Strip
Shahrekord	OIFS	CQD	**Shahrekord International Airport**
Shahrud	OIMJ	RUD	**Shahroud Airport**
Shiraz	OISS	SYZ	**Shiraz International Airport** (Shahid Dastgheib International)
Sirjan	OIKY	SYJ	**Sirjan Airport**
Sirri Island	OIBS	SXI	**Sirri Island Airport**
Tabas	OIMT	TCX	**Tabas Airport**
Tabriz	OITT	TBZ	**Tabriz International Airport**
Tehran	OIIG		Ghale Morghi Airport
Tehran	OIIE	IKA	**Imam Khomeini International Airport**
Tehran	OIII	THR	**Mehrabad International Airport**
Tehran	OIIO		PANHA Heliport
Tunb Island	OIBX		Tunb Airport
Urmia	OITR	OMH	**Urmia Airport**
Yasuj	OISY	YES	**Yasuj Airport**
Yazd	OIYP		Pardis Airport
Yazd	OIYY	AZD	**Shahid Sadooghi Airport**
Zabol	OIZB	ACZ	**Zabol Airport**
Zahedan	OIZH	ZAH	**Zahedan Airport**
Zanjan	OITZ	JWN	**Zanjan Airport**
Zarqan	OISO		Zarqan Airport
Zarrin Shahr	OIFV		ZarrinShahr Airport
**Military airports**
Ahmadi			Ahmadi Air Base
Amol	OINJ	BSM	Bishe Kola Air Base
Asalouyeh	OIBI	YEH	Asalouyeh Airport
Bandar Abbas	OIKO		Minab Air Base
Birjand	OIMB		Khor Air Base
Darrahi			Darrahi Air Base
Gorreh			Gorreh Air Base
Hamadan	OIHS		Hamadan Air Base (Nojeh Padegan)
Isfahan	OIFP		Badr Air Base
Isfahan	OIFE	IFH	Hesa Air Base
Isfahan	OIFH		Shahid Vatan Pour Air Base
Karaj	OIIF		Fath Air Base
Karaj	OIIM		Naja Air Base
Kashan	OIFK		Kashan Air Base
Nain			Nain Air Base
Omidiyeh	OIAJ	OMI	Omidiyeh Air Base
Qezel Qeshl			Qezel Qeshl Air Base
Semnan			New Semnan Airport
Soga	OIMX		Soga Air Base
Tehran	OIID		Doshan Tappeh Air Base
Vayqan			Vayqan Air Base

== Old airports route map in Iran ==
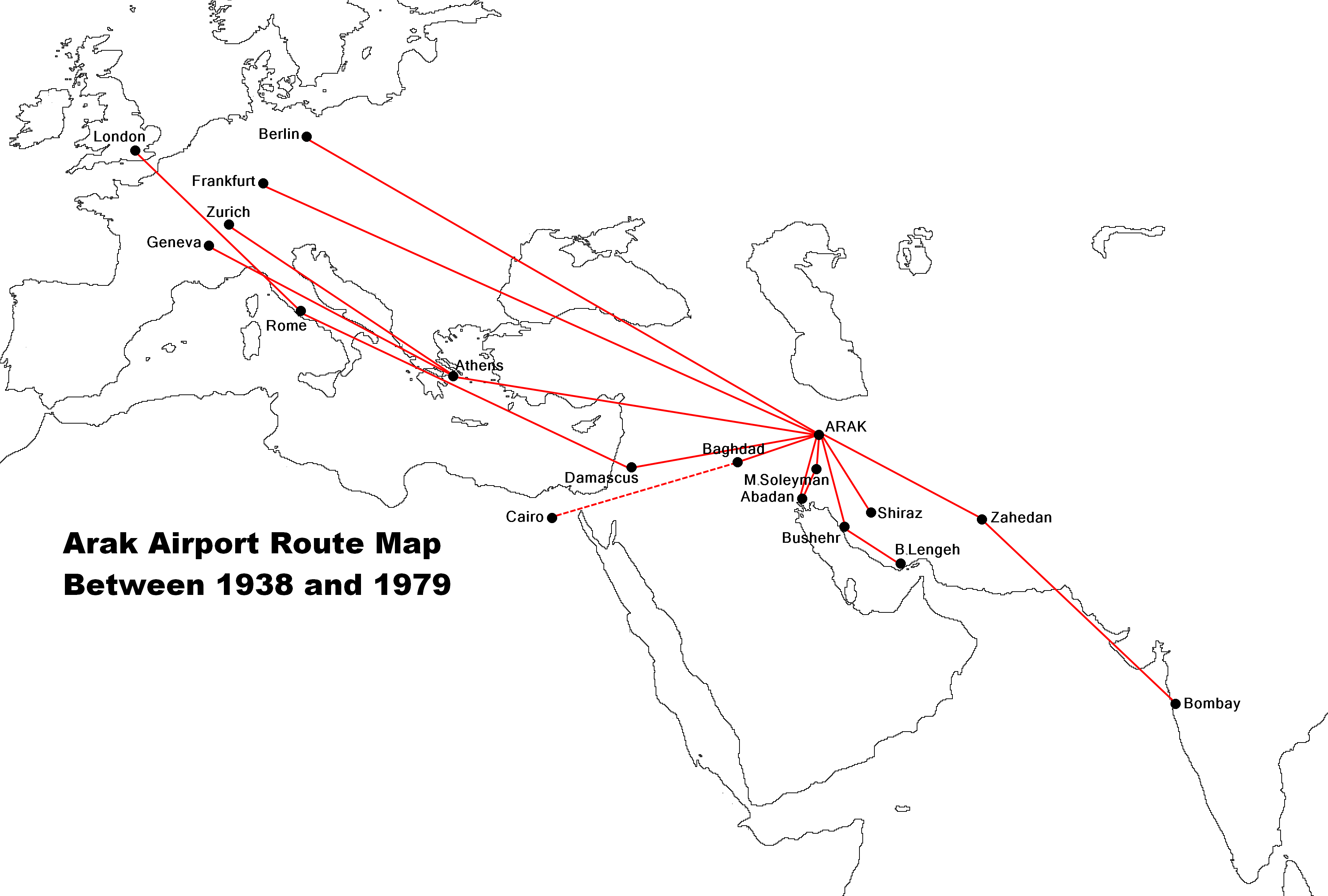
Arak

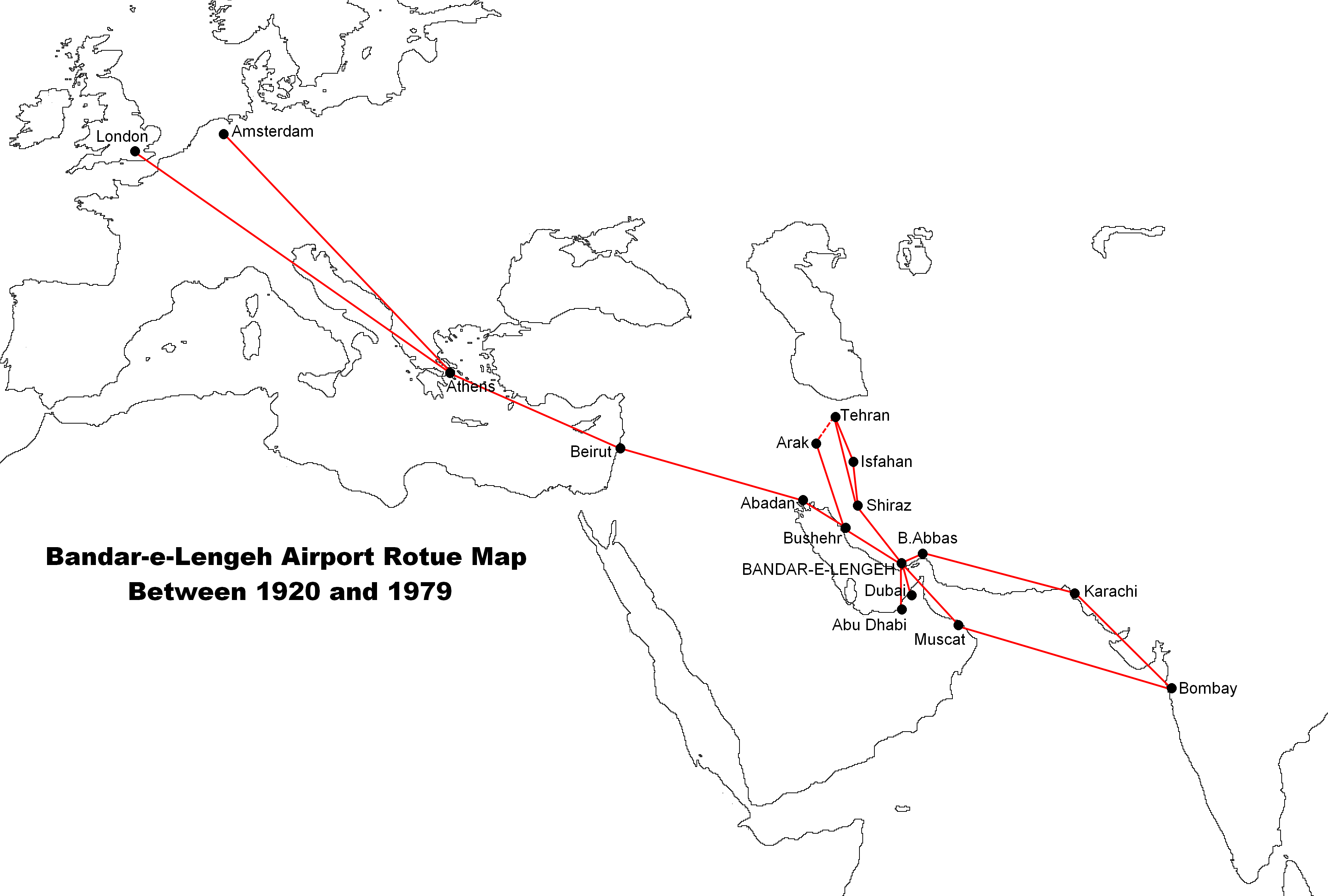
Bandar-e-Lengeh

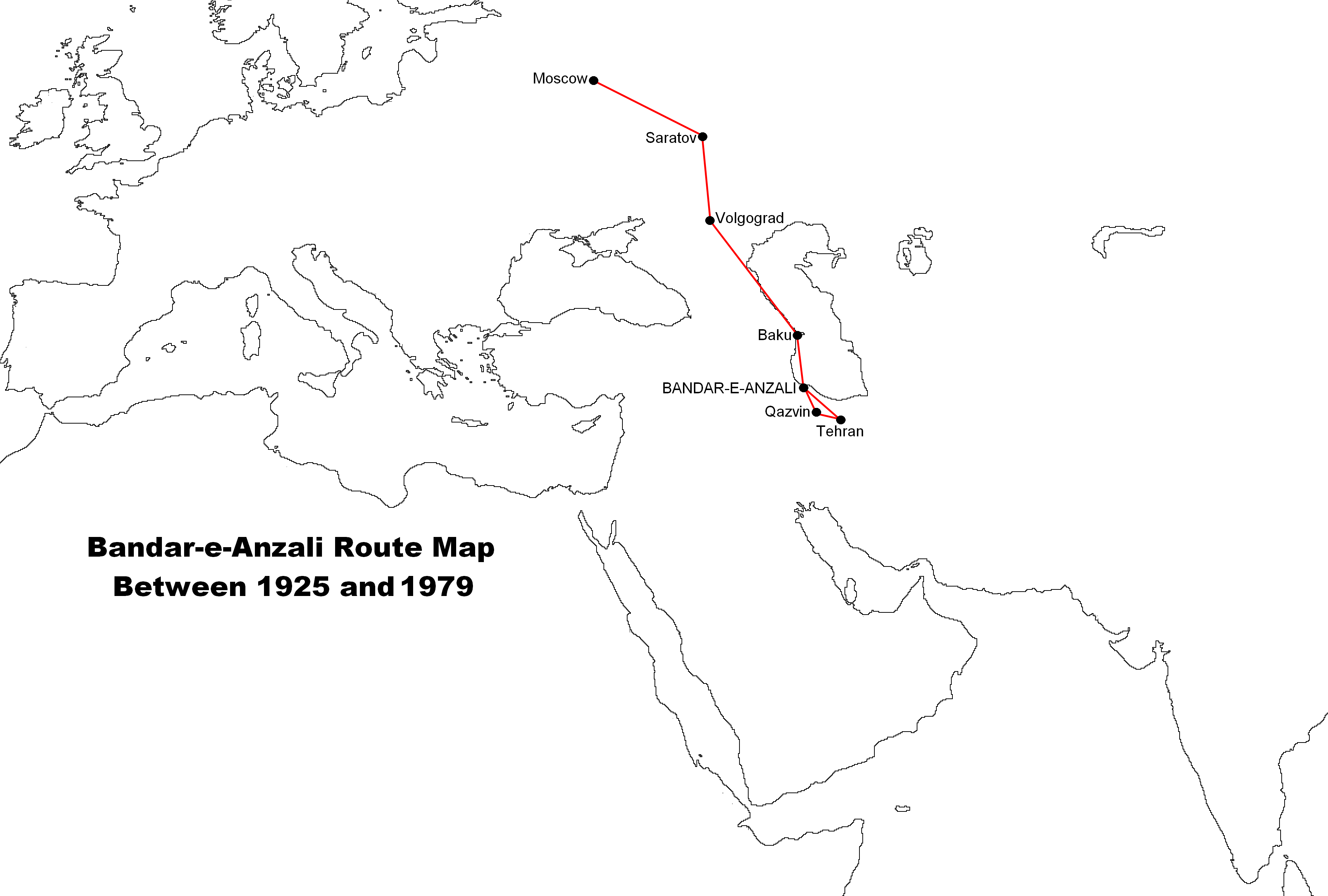
Bandar-e-Anzali

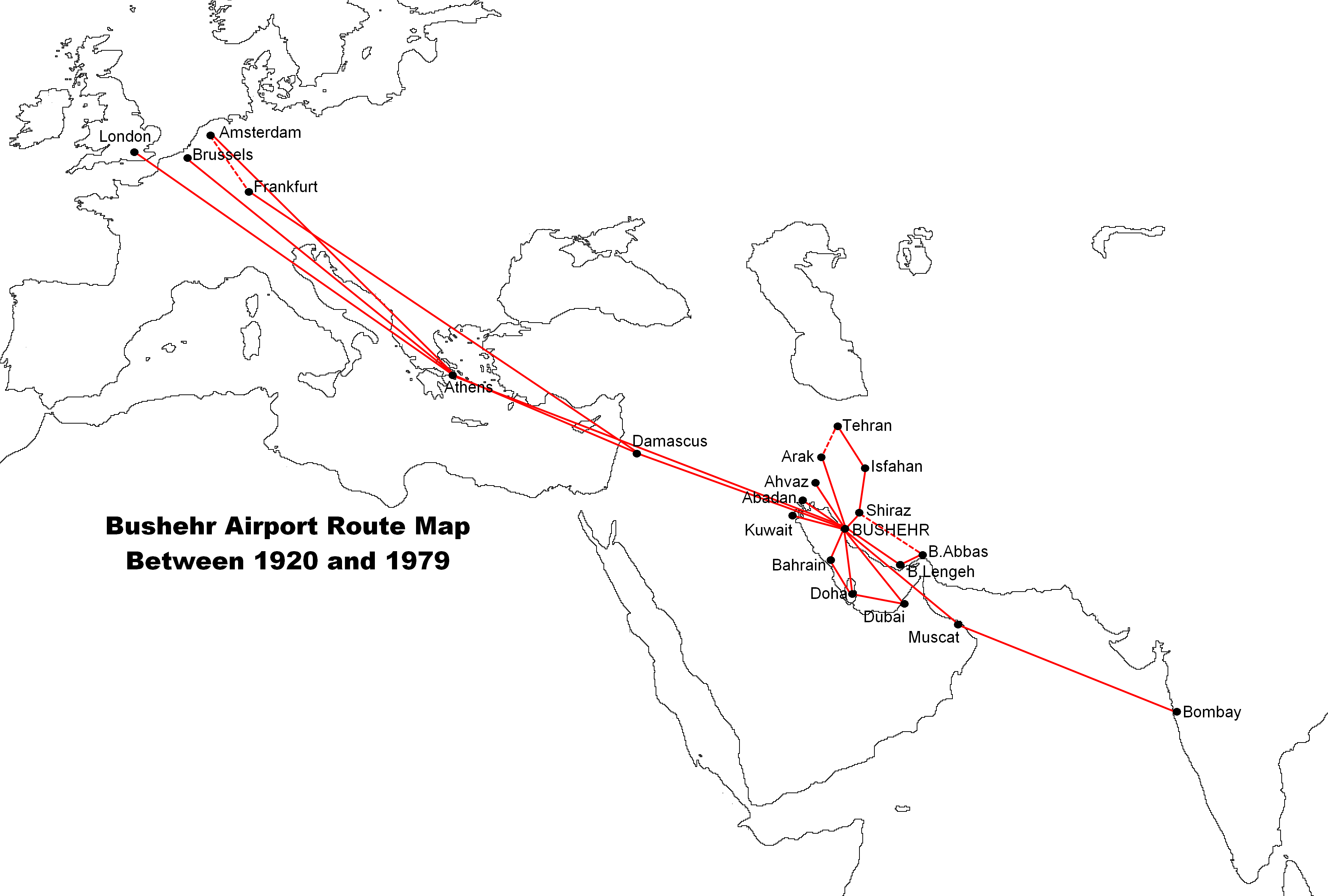
Bushehr

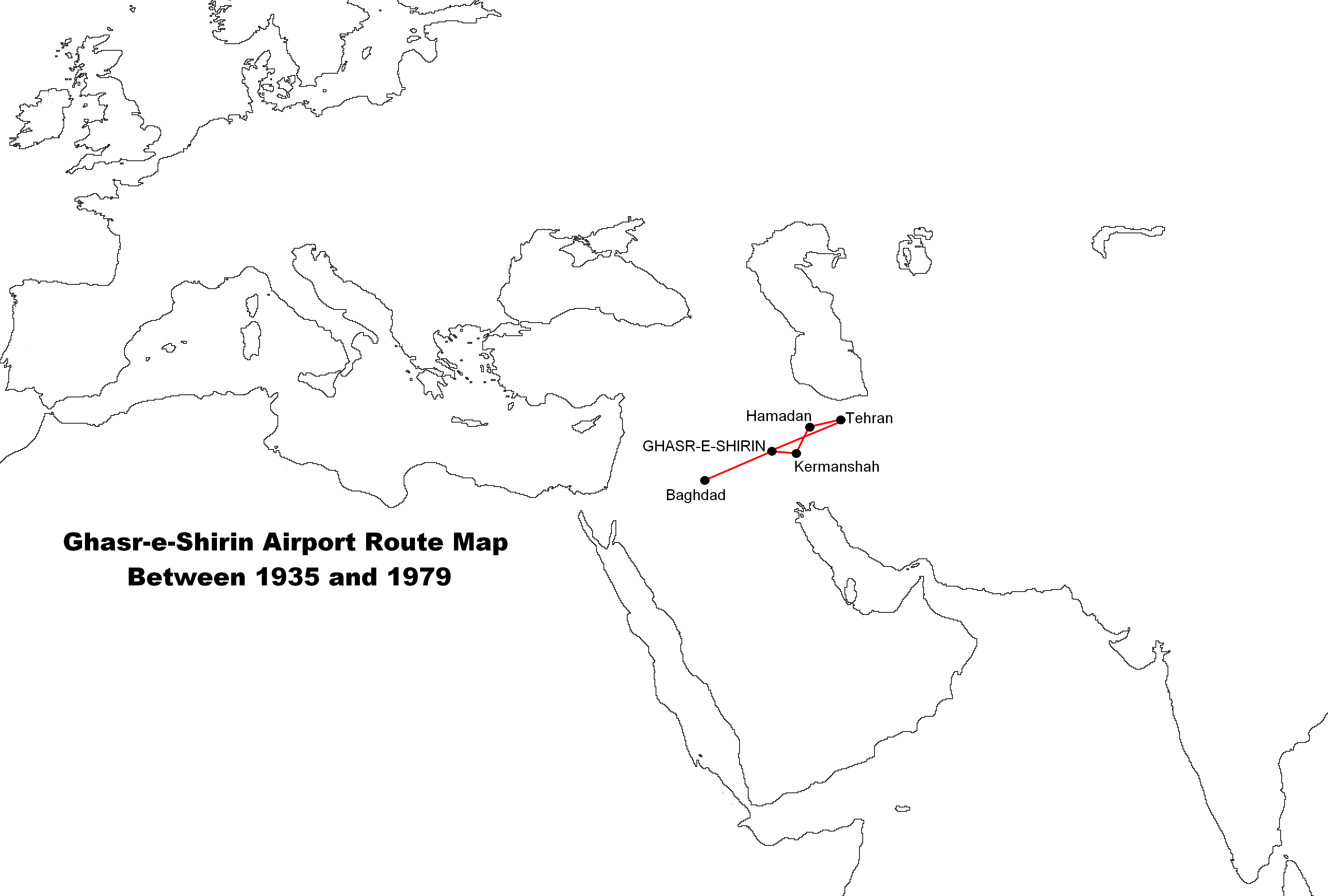
Ghasr-e-Shirin

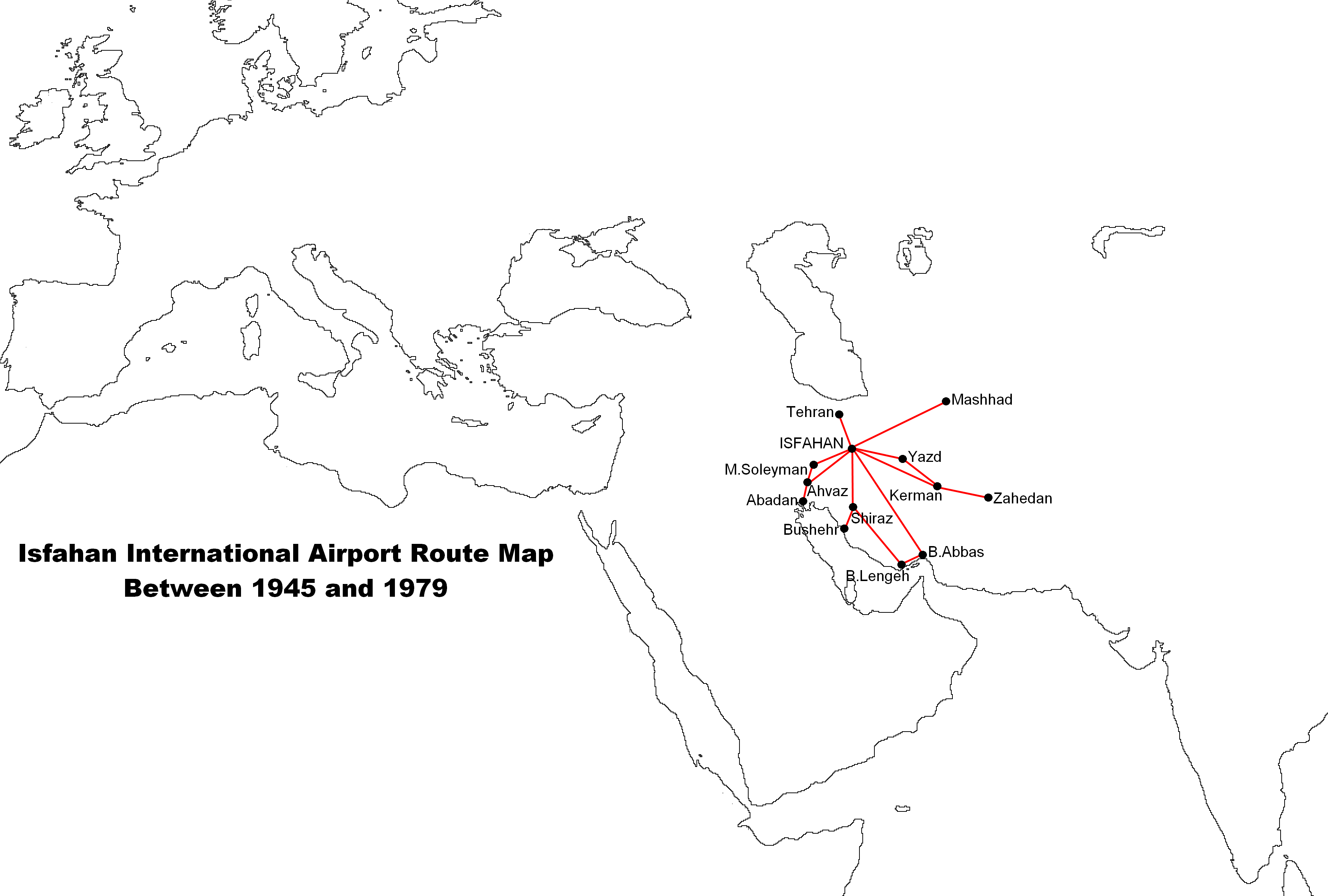
Isfahan

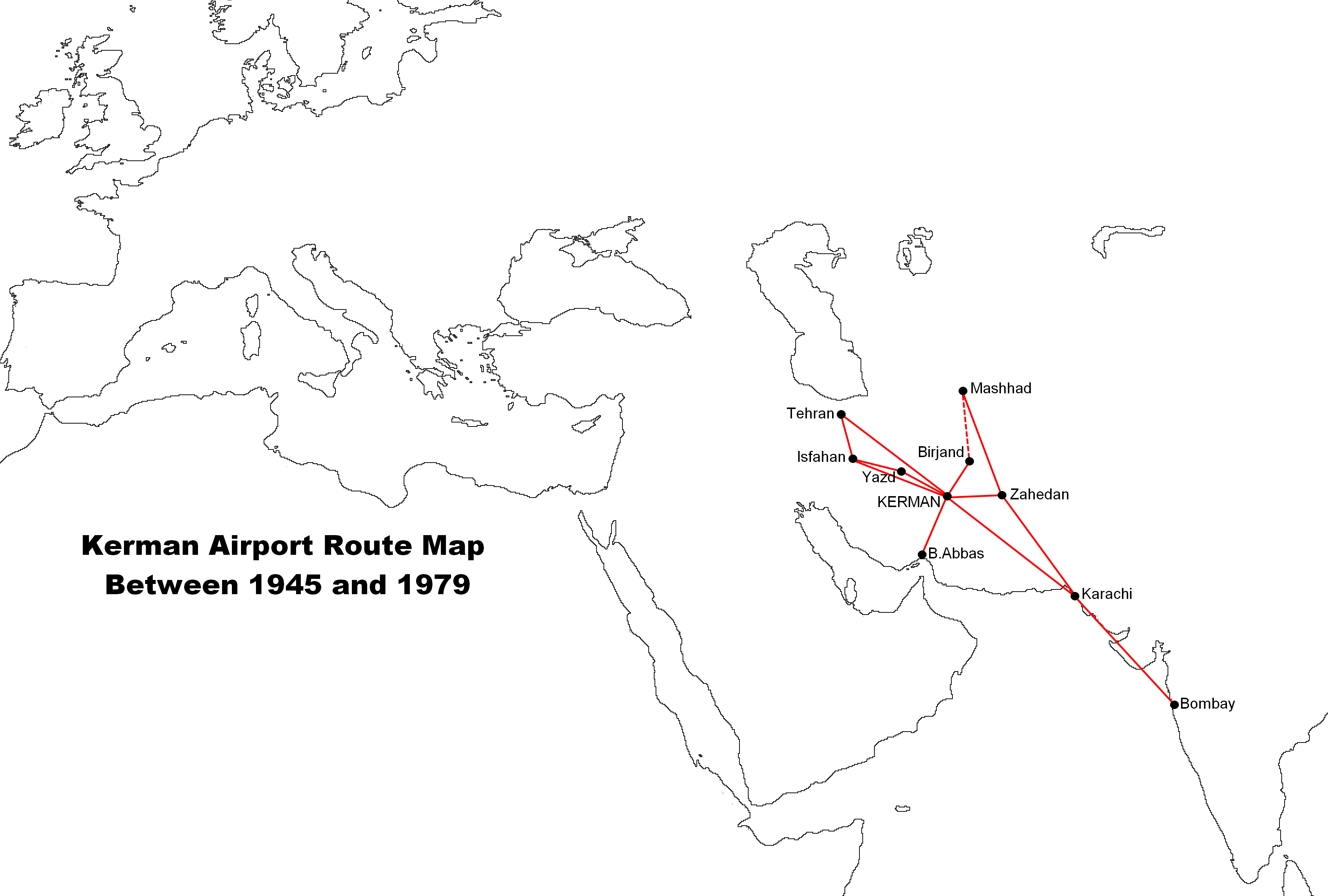
Kerman

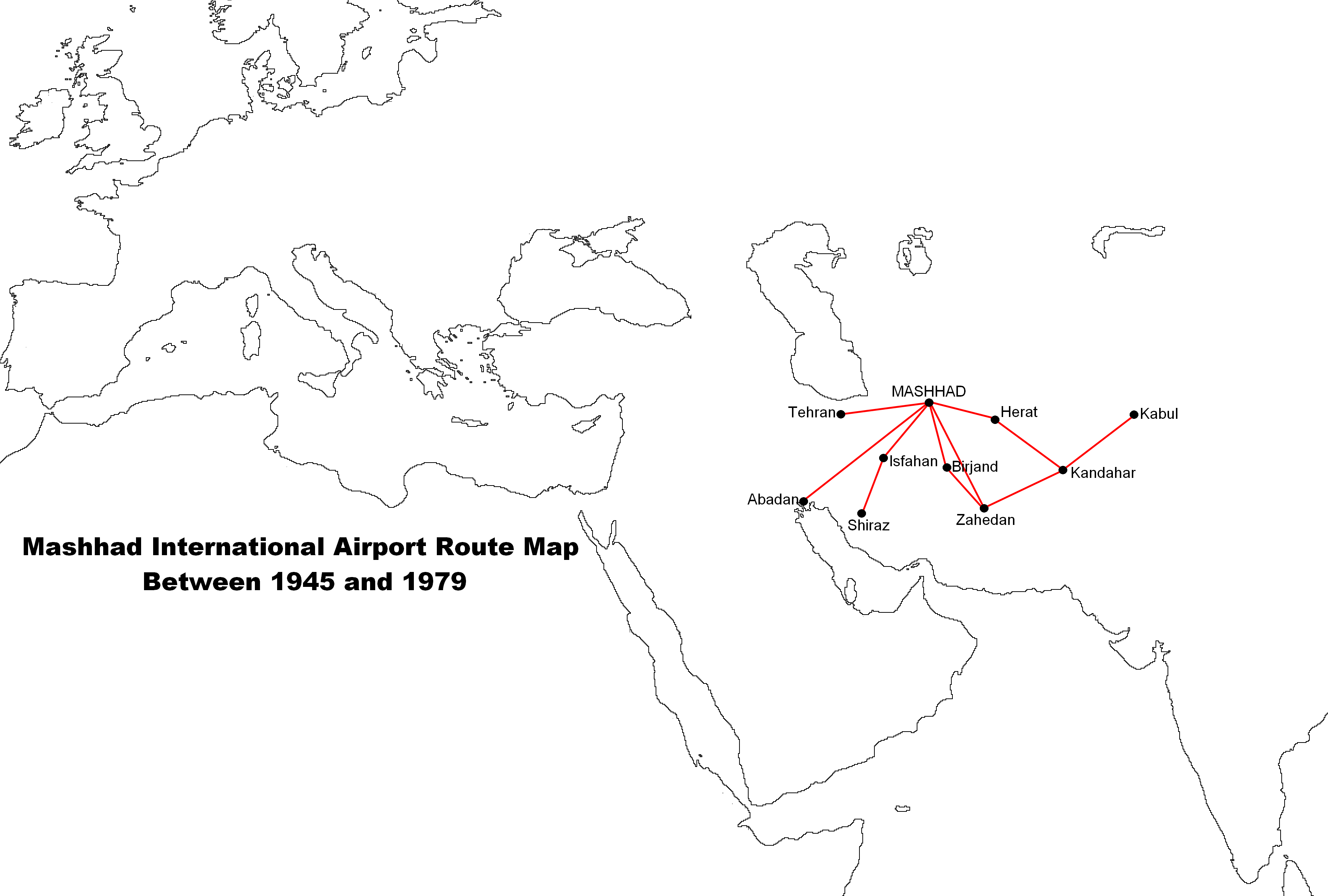
Mashhad

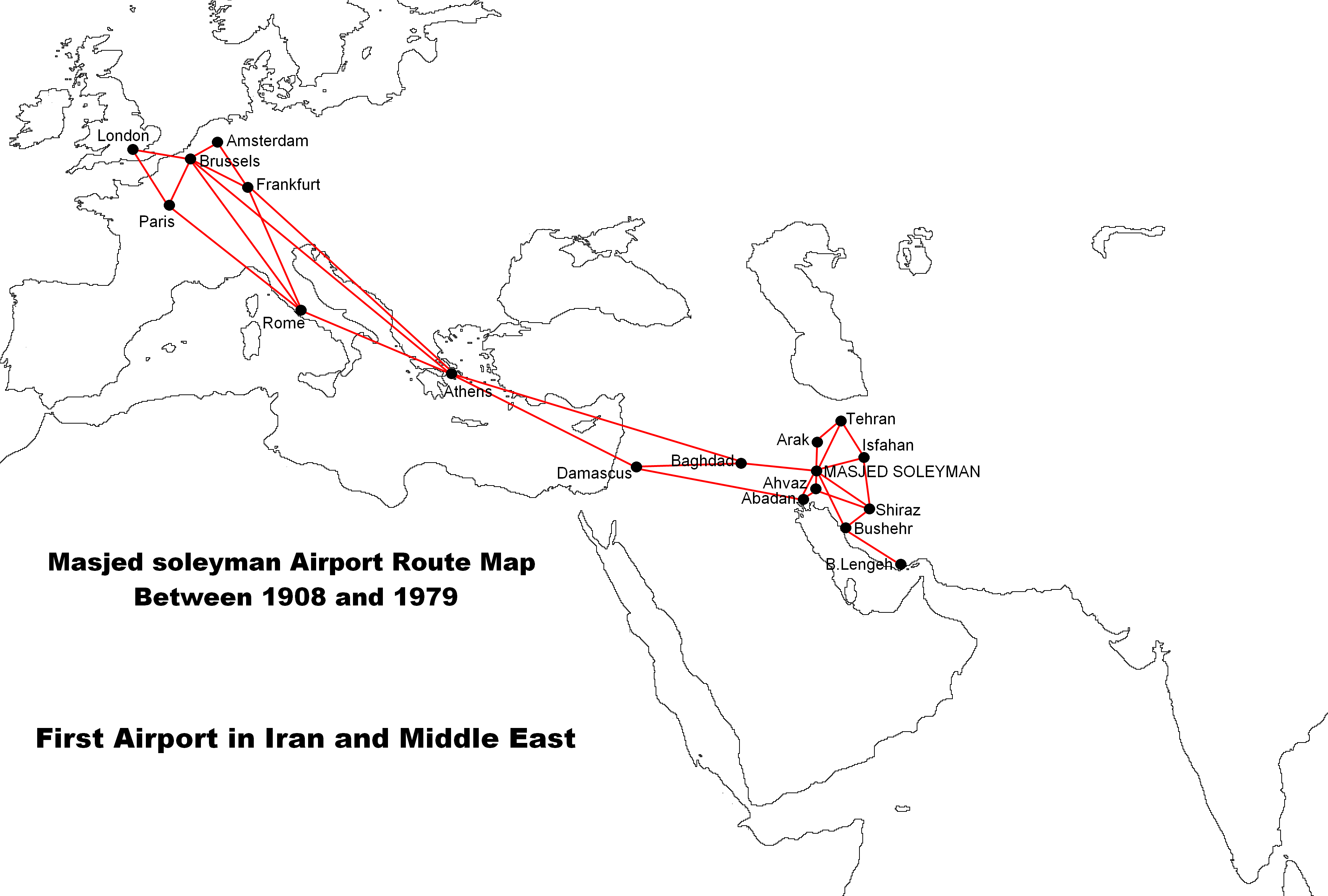
Masjed Soleyman, first airport in Iran and the Middle East

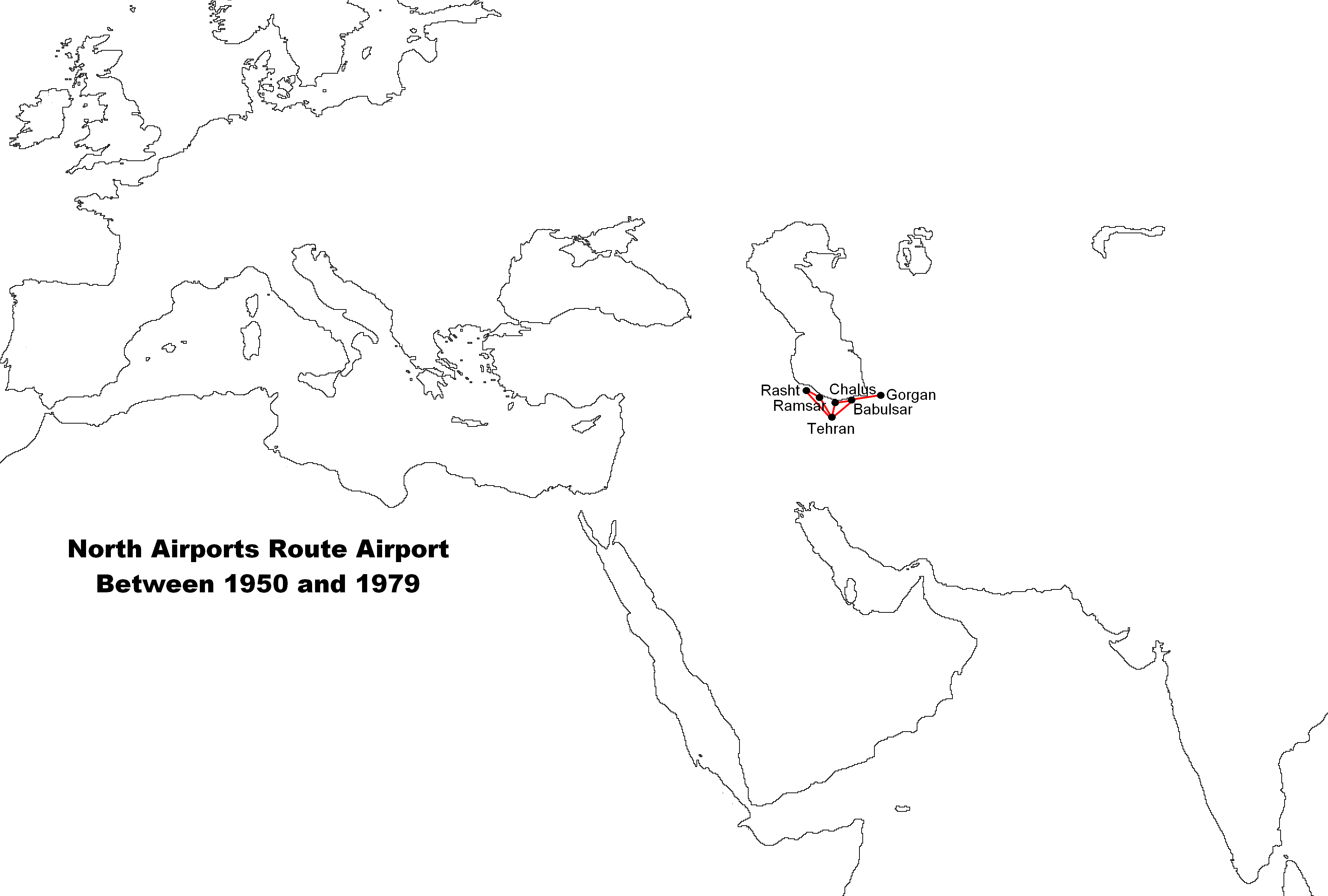
North Airports

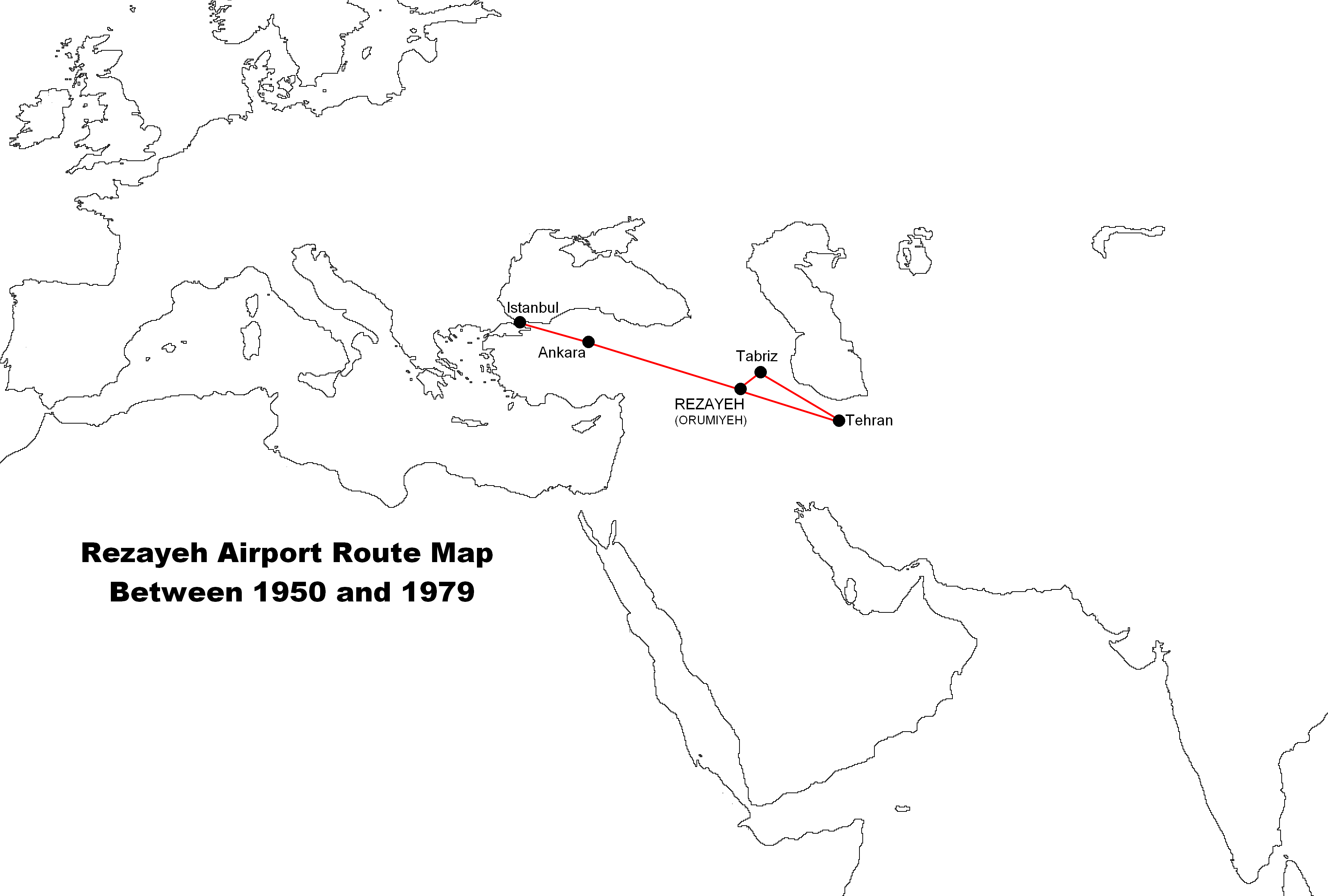
Orumiyeh

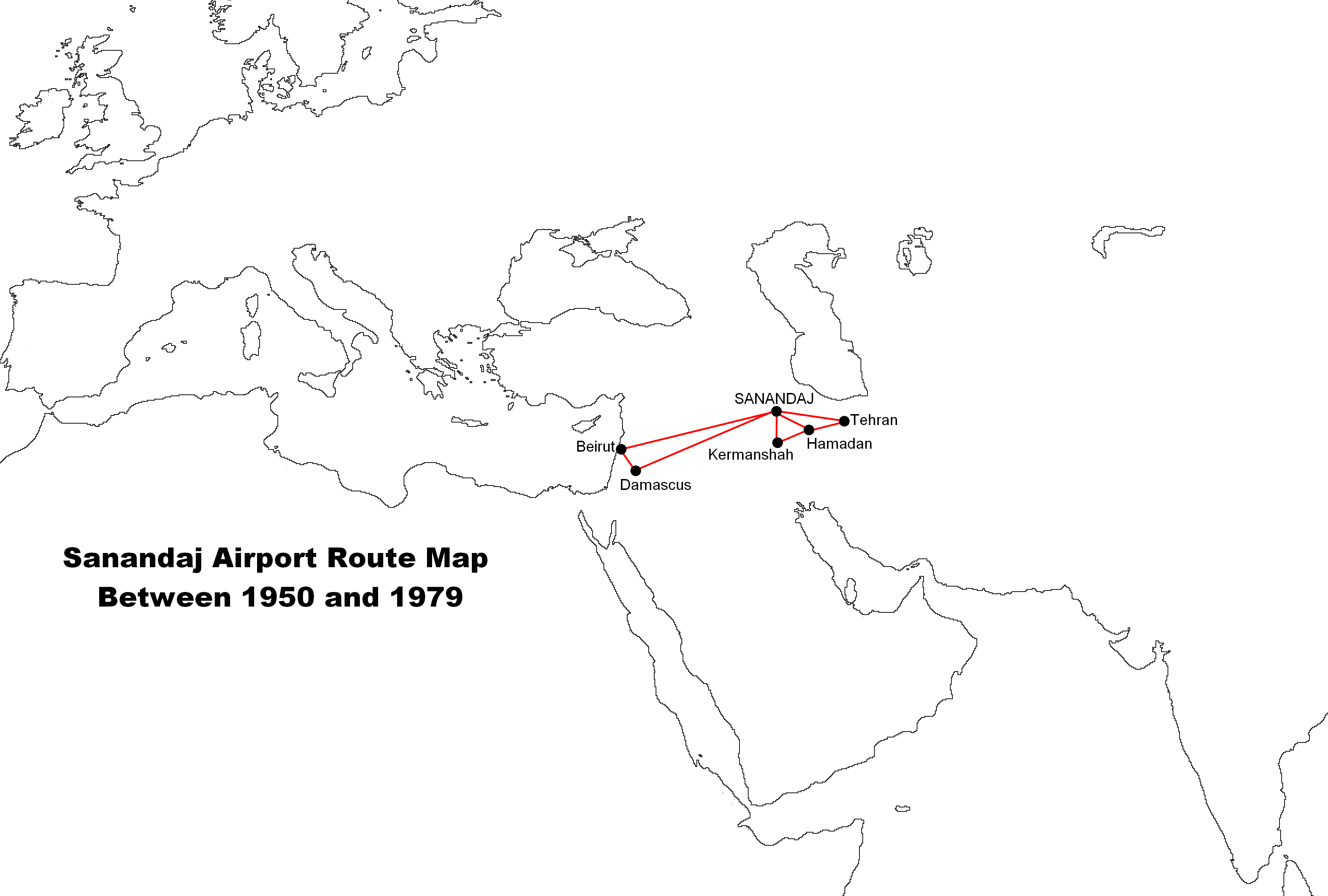
Sanandaj

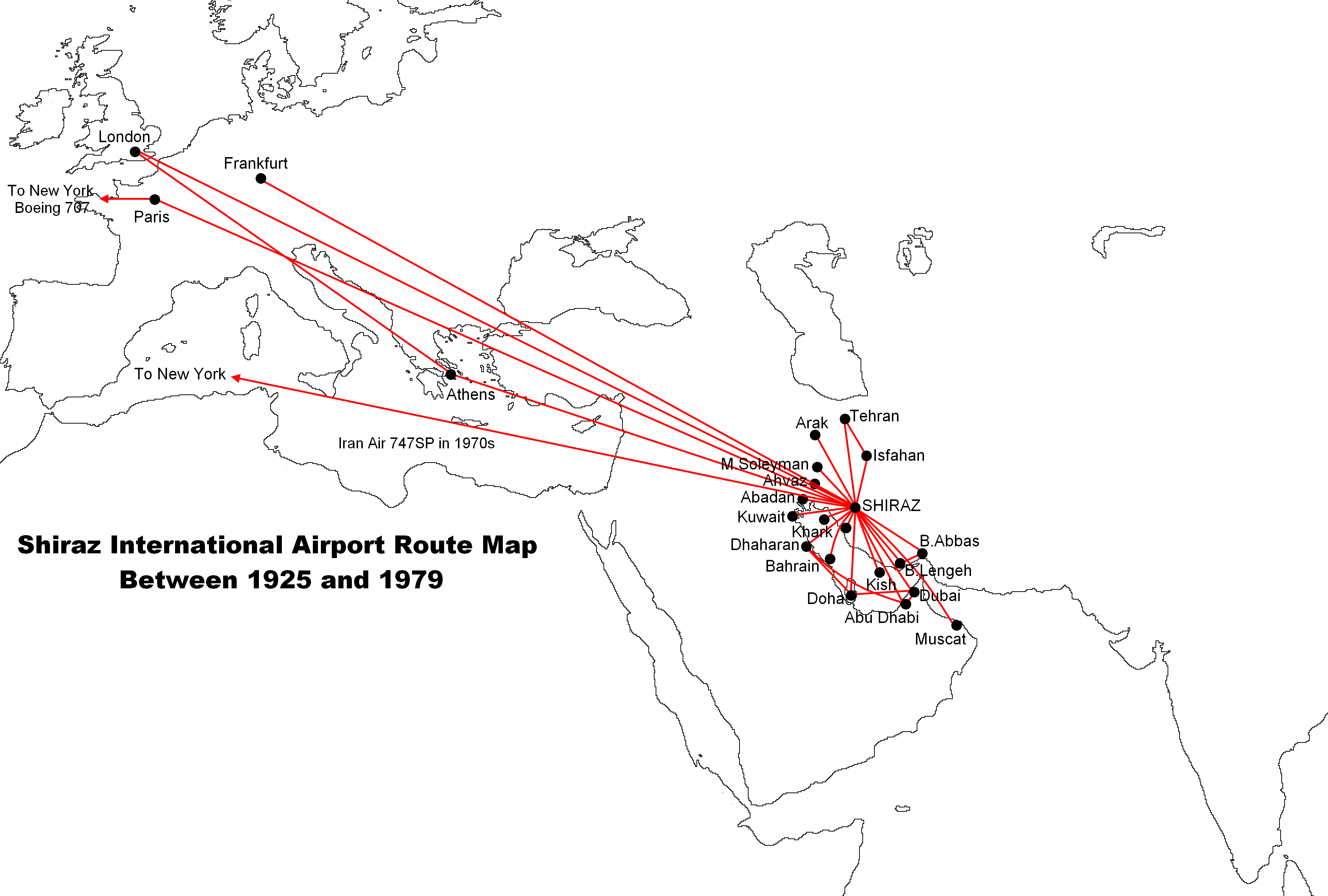
Shiraz

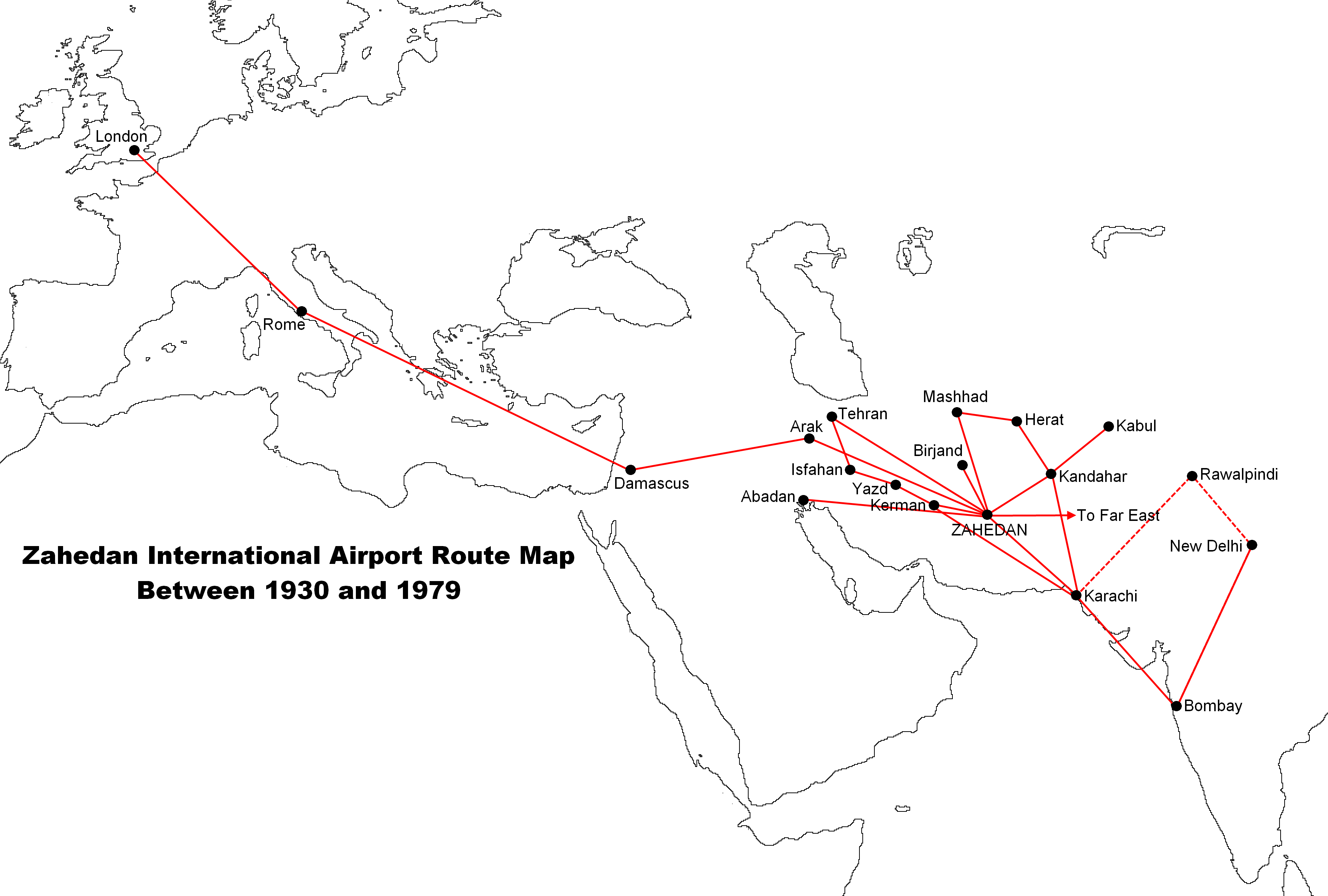
Zahedan

== See also ==
- List of airlines of Iran
- Busiest airports in Islamic Republic of Iran
- List of the busiest airports in the Middle East
- List of airports by ICAO code: O#OI - Iran
- List of Iranian Air Force bases
- Transport in Iran
- Wikipedia: WikiProject Aviation/Airline destination lists: Asia#Iran
