= Shahrekord Shahid Estaki International Airport =

Shahrekord Shohada International Airport
- IATA: CQD; ICAO: OIFS

Summary
- Airport type: Public
- Owner: Government of Iran
- Operator: Iran Airports Company
- Location: Shahrekord, Iran
- Elevation AMSL: 6,723 ft (2,049 m)
- Coordinates: 32°17′50″N 050°50′32″E

Map
- Location of airport in Iran

Runways
Direction	Length		Surface
Direction	ft	m	Surface
14/32	10,819	3,298	Asphalt
- Source: World Aero Data

Shahrekord Shohada International Airport (IATA: CQD, ICAO: OIFS) is an airport in Shahrekord, Chaharmahal & Bakhtiari province, Iran.

Shahrekord Airport is the highest airport in Iran with 6723 ft height. It is located 3 kilometers south of the city. The airport was operating in 1999.

The first domestic flight was in July 1999 by Iran Air Tours airline to Tehran, and first international flight was on 25 September 2002 to Kuwait International Airport.

It has an Asphalt runway that length 3298 meters and 45 meters width, and a taxiway with 23×285 meters dimensions.

Closest airports
Airport	Code	Distance
Isfahan	IFN / OIFM	108 km
Yasuj	YES / OISY	190 km
Kashan	KKS / OIFK	190 km

== Airlines and destinations ==
Airlines	Destinations
Iran Air	Tehran–Mehrabad
Iran Aseman Airlines	Asaluyeh, Tehran–Mehrabad
Mahan Air	Tehran–Mehrabad
Pars Air	Tehran–Mehrabad
Yazd Airways	Mashhad, Tehran–Mehrabad
