= JWN =

JWN may refer to:

- Nordstrom (NYSE: JWN), an American fashion retailer
- John C. Tune Airport (FAA: JWN), in Nashville, Tennessee, United States
- Zanjan Airport (IATA: JWN), in Iran
