= Dezful Airport =

Airport in Iran

- IATA: DEF; ICAO: OIAD

Summary
- Airport type: Public/military
- Owner: Government of Iran
- Operator: Iran Airports Company; Iranian Air Force
- Serves: Dezful, Khuzestan
- Location: Dezful, Iran
- Coordinates: 32°26′04″N 048°23′51.5″E

Map
- Location of airport in Iran

Runways
Direction	Length		Surface
Direction	ft	m	Surface
14R/32L	12,641	3,853	Asphalt
14L/32R	11,729	3,575	Asphalt
- Source: World Aero Data

Dezful Airport is located on Andimeshk road in the city of Dezful, Khuzestan province, Iran.

== Airlines and destinations ==
Airlines	Destinations
Iran Air	Tehran–Mehrabad
Karun Airlines	Mashhad, Tehran–Mehrabad
Mahan Air	Tehran–Mehrabad
Qeshm Air	Tehran–Mehrabad

== Military ==
Dezful Airport is also known as Vahdati Air Base, with military operations conducted by the Iran Air Force.
