= Bxr =

BXR or bxr may refer to:

- The Russia Buriat language
- BXR bikes (bicycle crossroadster), a type of a touring bicycle
- Bam Airport, Iran
- Buxar railway station, India
- Baxter railway station, Australia
