= AEU (disambiguation) =

AEU is the Australian Education Union, a current trade union in Australia.

AEU may also refer to:

- Abu Musa Airport in Hormozgan Province, Iran (IATA airport code AEU)
- Advanced European Union, a fictional body of Mobile Suit Gundam 00 characters
- Akeu language
- Album-equivalent unit, a measurement unit equivalent the purchase of one album copy in the music industry
- Amalgamated Engineering Union, a former trade union in Great Britain
- Amalgamated Engineering Union (Australia), a former Australian trade union
- American Ethical Union
