= Bandar Lengeh Airport =

- IATA: BDH; ICAO: OIBL

Summary
- Airport type: Public/Military
- Owner: Government of Iran
- Operator: Iran Airports Company; Islamic Republic of Iran Navy Aviation
- Serves: Bandar Lengeh, Iran
- Elevation AMSL: 66 ft / 20 m
- Coordinates: 26°31′55.2″N 54°49′29.45″E

Map
- Location of airport in Iran

Runways
Direction	Length		Surface
Direction	ft	m	Surface
08/26	8,203	2,500	Asphalt
- Source: World Aero Data

Bandar Lengeh Airport (IATA: BDH, ICAO: OIBL) is an airport in Bandar Lengeh, Hormozgan, Iran.

The airport only serves domestic flights to Iranian cities including Shiraz and Tehran.

Previously, it became as an international airport when Iran Air operated a flight to Dubai, Abu Dhabi and Muscat. however, scheduled international flights were ended in the early 1980s and it only serves domestic flights.

== Airlines and destinations ==
Airlines	Destinations
Iran Air	Shiraz, Tehran–Mehrabad
Yazd Airways	Tehran–Mehrabad
