= Sirjan Airport =

- IATA: SYJ; ICAO: OIKY

Summary
- Airport type: Public
- Owner: Government of Iran
- Operator: Iran Airports Company
- Location: Sirjan, Kerman Province, Iran
- Elevation AMSL: 5,847 ft / 1,782 m
- Coordinates: 29°33′01″N 055°39′55″E

Map
- Location of airport in Iran

Runways
Direction	Length		Surface
Direction	m	ft	Surface
13/31	3,700	12,139	Asphalt
- Sources: WAD, GCM, STV

Sirjan Airport (IATA: SYJ, ICAO: OIKY) is an airport serving Sirjan, in the Kerman Province of Iran. A public airport, it is operated by Iran Airports Company

== Airlines and destinations ==
Airlines	Destinations
Asa Jet	Tehran–Mehrabad
Karun Airlines	Tehran–Mehrabad
Pars Air	Tehran–Mehrabad
Yazd Airways	Tehran–Mehrabad
