= RJN =

RJN may refer to:

- Council of National Unity (Rada Jedności Narodowej, RJN), a defunct quasi-parliament of the Polish Underground State during World War I
- Rafsanjan Airport (IATA: RJN), an airport in Rafsanjan, Iran
- Rajnandgaon railway station (Indian Railways station code: RJN), a railway station in Chhattisgarh, India
- Ram Janmabhoomi Nyas, an Indian trust overseeing the building of The Ram Mandir in Ayodhya
- RJN Motorsport, a British auto racing team
