= CQD (disambiguation) =

CQD is one of the first distress signals adopted for radio use.

CQD or cqd may also refer to:

- Carbon quantum dot, a carbon nanoparticle which is less than 10 nm in size and has some form of surface passivation
- Chuanqiandian Cluster Miao language (ISO 639-3: cqd), a Hmongic language spoken by the Hmong people
- Shahrekord Shahid Estaki International Airport (IATA: CQD), an airport in Shahrekord, Chaharmahal & Bakhtiari, Iran
