= XBJ =

XBJ or xbj may refer to:

- XBJ, the IATA code for Birjand International Airport, Iran
- xbj, the ISO 639-3 code for Birrpayi language, New South Wales, Australia
