= France Pastry =

Confectionery in Tehran

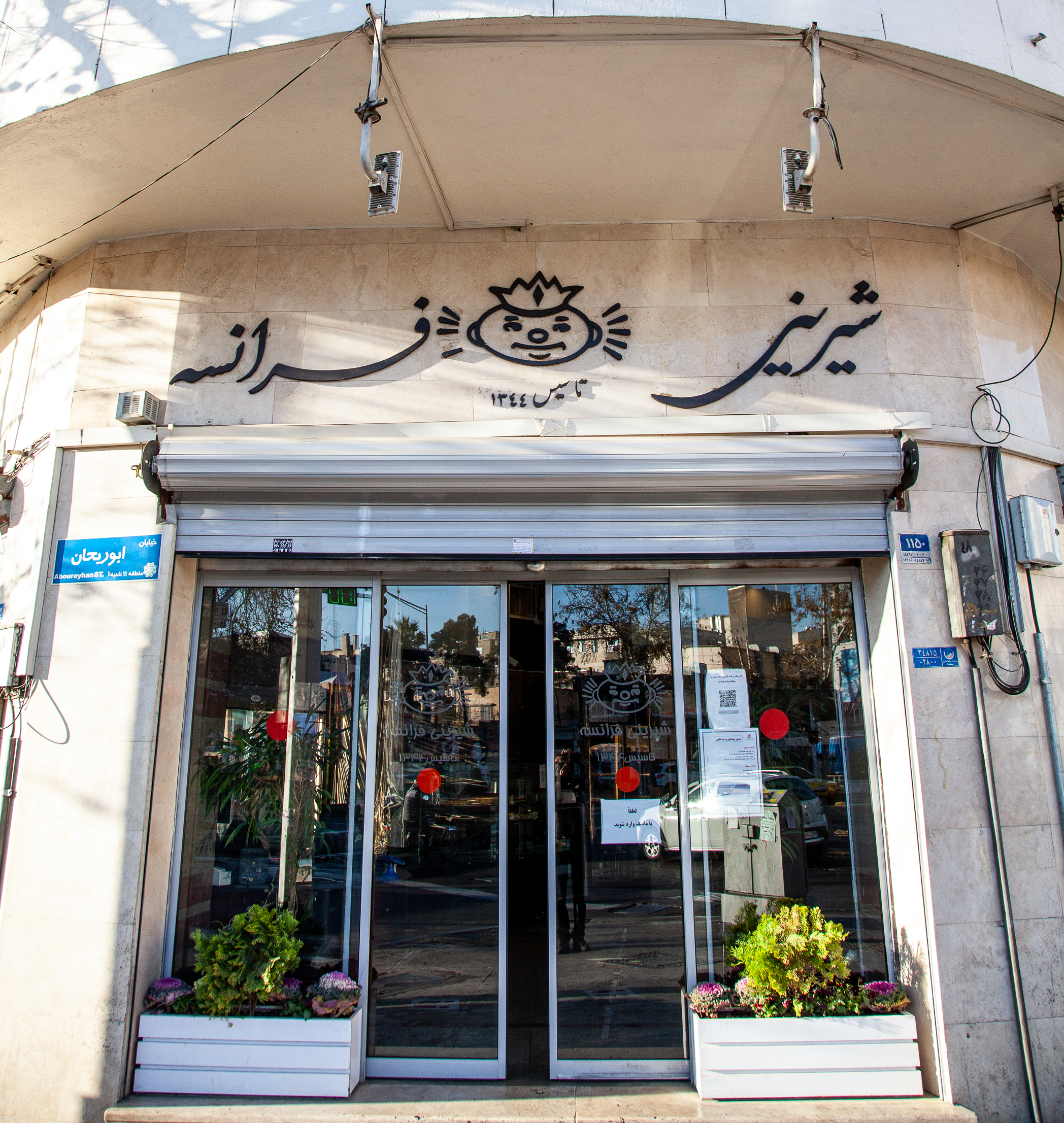
- Industry: Confectionery
- Founded: 1965
- Headquarters: Tehran, Iran
- Products: Cookies

France Pastry is a confectionery in Tehran, Iran, specializing in European cookies. It is one of the oldest confectioneries in Tehran.

== History ==
France Pastry was established in 1965 by Mohammad Sabetghadam with the help of three of his friends. They designed a place in addition to the workshop. It took about a year to import confectionery-related machines from abroad, because there were no new bread-making machines in Iran at that time. At that time, early in Hoveyda's government, the machines were confiscated at customs, and their clearance took about six months. The founders also brought a Swiss chef (living in France) named Gilbert Barrow to Iran to make a modern difference in baking. At first, there were problems in extending Barrow's residence, but after he married an Iranian woman, his residence problem was resolved. Barrow was in Iran until 1977, then worked for a while in catering at Mehrabad airport and left Iran after the revolution.
