= Parsabad-Moghan Airport =

- IATA: PFQ; ICAO: OITP

Summary
- Airport type: Public
- Owner: Government of Iran
- Operator: Iran Airports Company
- Serves: Parsabad, Ardabil
- Location: Parsabad, Iran
- Elevation AMSL: 253 ft / 77 m
- Coordinates: 39°36′12.98″N 047°52′53.40″E
- Website: parsabad.airport.ir

Map
- Location of airport in Iran

Runways
| Direction | Length | | Surface |
| Direction | ft | m | Surface |
|---|---|---|---|
| 11/29 | 8,490 | 2,588 | Asphalt |
- Source: World Aero Data

Parsabad-Moghan Airport is an airport in Parsabad, in Iran's Ardabil province (IATA: PFQ, ICAO: OITP).

== Airlines and destinations ==
| Airlines | Destinations |
|---|---|
| Iran Air | Tehran–Mehrabad |
| Mahan Air | Tehran–Mehrabad |
