= Saqqez Airport =

Airport in Tehran, Iran

Coordinates: 36°13′06″N 46°17′56″E

Saqqez Airport فرودگاه سقز
- IATA: TQZ; ICAO: OITS

Summary
- Airport type: Public
- Owner: Government of Iran
- Operator: Iran Airports Company
- Location: Saqqez, Iran

Map
- Location of airport in Iran

Saqqez Airport, sometimes called Saghez Airport, (ICAO: OITS) is a domestic airport near Saqqez located in the province of Kurdistan in Iran. The airport has been newly constructed for the use of the people of the northern cities of Kurdistan province and the southern cities of West Azerbaijan, especially the free trade zones of Baneh and Marivan.

== History ==
=== Start date ===
Saqqez Airport was started in 2005 with a credit of 15,000 million Rials (from regional development and balance credits) on the southeastern side of Saqez at km (0 + 500) of Marivan Road with an area of 220 hectares.

=== Commissioning Saqqez airport in 2021 ===
Kurdistan province governor said: "The Saqqez city airport in the Kurdistan province (western Iran) will be commissioned fully by the end of 9th month of next Iranian year ( December 21, 2021), the Head of Iran Airports and Air Navigation Company (IAC) Siavash Amir Mokri said, Trend reports citing the Ministry of Roads and Urban Development of Iran".

=== The first phase ===
The first phase of the airport opened on July 21, 2021, and the first Flight Check aircraft landed at the airport.

=== The Project completion ===
The completion of this airport was resumed in 2023, and with a special budget of 1000 billion Iranian Rials, an effort was made to build other parts of it and to resolve the issues that the experts of the Civil Aviation Organization had announced as the problems of the project. The governor of Kurdistan emphasized the completion of this airport in a meeting with the head of the Civil Aviation Organization.

== Specifications ==
The airport has an area of 220 hectares, has a runway with a length of 2,930 meters, a taxiway with a length of 450 meters, an apron with an area of 2,500 square meters, and an access route to the airport of 450 meters. Also, the airport terminal building with an area of 2,298 square meters includes a waiting hall and transit, and a side building with an area of 330 square meters has been constructed.

== Airlines and destinations ==
Airlines	Destinations
Iran Air	Tehran–Mehrabad
