= Gachsaran Airport =

- IATA: GCH; ICAO: OIAH

Summary
- Owner: Government of Iran
- Operator: Iran Airports Company
- Serves: Gachsaran, Iran
- Coordinates: 30°20′15″N 050°49′41″E

Map
- Location of the airport in Iran

Runways
| Direction | Length | | Surface |
| Direction | m | ft | Surface |
|---|---|---|---|
| 12/30 | 2,600 | 8,530 | Asphalt |
- Source: GCM, STV

Gachsaran Airport (IATA: GCH, ICAO: OIAH) is an airport serving Dogonbadan (Gachsaran), Iran. It is located in Kohgiluyeh and Boyer-Ahmad province.

== Airlines and destinations ==
| Airlines | Destinations |
|---|---|
| Mahan Air | Tehran–Mehrabad |
| Pars Air | Tehran–Mehrabad |
