= Tabas Airport =

Tabas Airport فرودگاه طبس
- IATA: TCX; ICAO: OIMT

Summary
- Airport type: Public
- Owner: Government of Iran
- Operator: Iran Airports Company
- Location: Tabas, Iran
- Elevation AMSL: 2,312 ft / 705 m
- Coordinates: 33°40′03″N 056°53′33″E

Map
- Location of airport in Iran

Runways
Direction	Length		Surface
Direction	m	ft	Surface
15/33	3,041	9,977	Asphalt
- Source: DAFIF

Tabas Airport (Persian: فرودگاه طبس – Ferūdgāh-e Ţabas) (IATA: TCX, ICAO: OIMT) is an airport serving Tabas, a city in the South Khorasan Province of central Iran. For census purposes, it is an abadi in Montazeriyeh Rural District, in the Central District of Tabas County, South Khorasan Province. At the 2006 census, its population was 14, in 6 families. Tabas is a public airport operated by Iran Airports Company.

== Airlines and destinations ==
Airlines	Destinations
Mahan Air	Tehran–Mehrabad
Pars Air	Tehran–Mehrabad
Yazd Airways	Tehran–Mehrabad
