= Qom International Airport =

Airport in Qom, Iran

Qom International Airport فرودگاه بین‌المللی قم
- IATA: none; ICAO: OIIQ

Summary
- Serves: Qom
- Location: Qom, Iran
- Elevation AMSL: 3,704 ft / 1,129 m
- Coordinates: 34°34′50″N 50°38′53″E
- Interactive map of Qom International Airport

Qom International Airport (Persian: فرودگاه بين المللي قم) is an under construction international airport located 24 kilometres (15 mi) southwest of the city of Qom in Iran.

In August 2014, Chinese investors from Gansu showed an interest in financing the construction of the international airport.

== See also ==
- List of airports in Iran
