= Sabzevar Airport =

Sabzevar Airport فرودگاه سبزوار
- IATA: AFZ; ICAO: OIMS

Summary
- Airport type: Public
- Owner: Government of Iran
- Operator: Iran Airports Company
- Serves: Sabzevar, Razavi Khorasan
- Location: Sabzevar, Iran
- Elevation AMSL: 3,010 ft / 917 m
- Coordinates: 36°10′05.10″N 057°35′42.66″E

Map
- Location of airport in Iran

Runways
Direction	Length		Surface
Direction	ft	m	Surface
09/27	10,428	3,178	Asphalt
- Source: World Aero Data

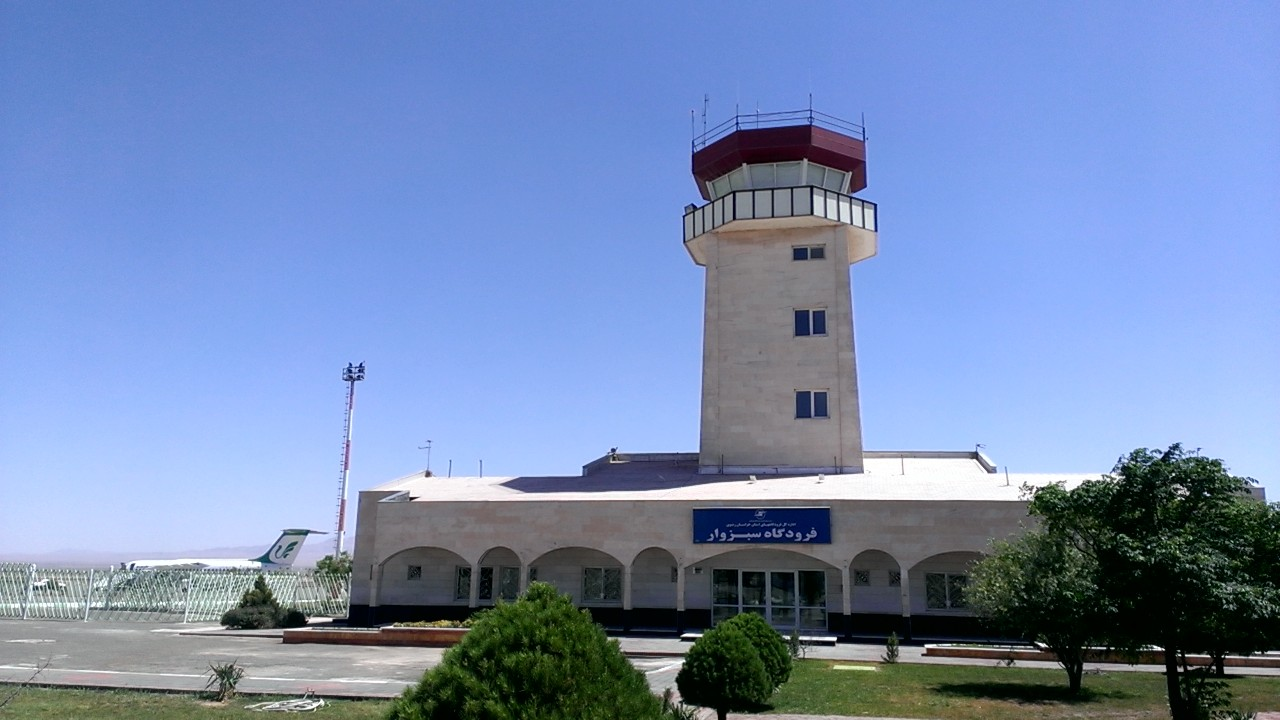
Sabzevar Airport.

Sabzevar Airport (Persian: فرودگاه سبزوار) (IATA: AFZ, ICAO: OIMS) is an airport in Sabzevar, Razavi Khorasan province, Iran.

== Airlines and destinations ==
Airlines	Destinations
ATA Airlines	Tehran–Mehrabad
Yazd Airways	Tehran–Mehrabad
