= Kashmar UltraLight Airport =

Airport in Razavi Khorasan Province, Iran

- IATA: none; ICAO: OIMQ

Summary
- Airport type: UltraLight & Light
- Owner: Mohammad Reza Kavyani
- Operator: Civil Aviation Organization (Iran)
- Serves: Kashmar
- Location: Kashmar
- Opened: 1 March 2015
- Time zone: Iran Standard Time (UTC 3:30+)
- Elevation AMSL: 3,777 ft / 1,149.1 m
- Coordinates: 35°26′04″N 058°50′57″E
- Website: www.kavianpsh.ir

Map
- Kashmar UltraLight Airport

Runways
Direction	Length		Surface
Direction	ft	m	Surface
09/27	2,620/4,510	800/1,400	Asphalt

Kashmar Ultralight and Light Airport (Persian: فرودگاه فوق سبک و سبک کاشمر) is an airport located southwest of Khorasan Razavi province (approximately 240 km (150 mi) from Mashhad) in the city of Kashmar, Iran.

Kashmar Ultralight Airport occupies 17 hectares (42 acres) of land and exclusively services light and ultra-light aircraft on its one runway. The airport has one terminal.

Kashmar Ultralight Airport is the first light airport with a defense tower. It is speculated that this installment may have been implemented due to fears of an airplane collision like that of the 1993 Tehran mid-air collision. (The 1993 Tehran incident was ultimately ruled to be not an act of terrorism but rather a result of poor communication between pilots and air traffic controllers.) The defense tower might also, at some point, be used by Iran's military in support of UAV operations in the middle east.

The infrastructure consists of a hangar and office building occupying 2,000 square metres (22,000 sq ft) and a runway. In 2016, flights began from this airport.

Kashmar Airport and associate, Kavian Parvaz Shargh Company, obtained permission for ultralight pilot training from the country's aviation organization: the first trainee was Captain Mohammad Reza Kaviani.

== Infrastructure ==
The Kavian Airport Aviation Science and Technology Training Center is the largest and most equipped ultralight aviation center in Kashmar. It offers training in becoming a pilot, aircraft maintenance, dispatching, avionics, and hospitality. The center provides a large range of aircraft for student pilots and a large hangar for students studying maintenance.

Kashmar Airport can be reached from Mashhad via Road 36 by private car, taxi, or bus.

== See also ==
- Iran Airports Company
- ICAO Airport Code
