= Zabol Airport =

- IATA: ACZ; ICAO: OIZB

Summary
- Airport type: Public
- Owner: Government of Iran
- Operator: Iran Airports Company
- Location: Zabol, Iran
- Elevation AMSL: 1,628 ft (496 m)
- Coordinates: 31°05′54″N 061°32′38″E
- Website: http://zabol.airport.ir

Map
- Location of airport in Iran

Runways
Direction	Length		Surface
Direction	ft	m	Surface
16/34	9,848	3,002	Asphalt
- Source: World Aero Data

Zabol Airport (IATA: ACZ, ICAO: OIZB) is an airport north-east of Zabol, in Iran's Sistan and Baluchestan province.

== Airlines and destinations ==
Airlines	Destinations
Mahan Air	Mashhad, Tehran–Mehrabad
Pars Air	Tehran–Mehrabad
Qeshm Air	Mashhad

== Bus routes ==
- Melli Coach (Zaranj)
