= Jiroft Airport =

- IATA: JYR; ICAO: OIKJ

Summary
- Airport type: Public
- Operator: Iran Airports Company
- Serves: Jiroft
- Location: Jiroft, Iran
- Elevation AMSL: 811 m (2,661 ft)
- Coordinates: 28°43′37″N 057°40′13″E

Map
- Location of airport in Iran

Runways
Direction	Length		Surface
Direction	m	ft	Surface
13/31	2,206	7,236	Asphalt

Jiroft Airport is an airport in Jiroft, Iran (IATA: JYR, ICAO: OIKJ). It is a public airport operated by Iran Airports Company.

== Airlines and destinations ==
Airlines	Destinations
Mahan Air	Iranshahr, Tehran–Mehrabad
