= Shahroud Airport =

Shahrud International Airport
- IATA: RUD; ICAO: OIMJ

Summary
- Airport type: Public
- Owner: Government of Iran
- Operator: Iran Airports Company
- Location: Shahrud, Semnan Province, Iran
- Elevation AMSL: 4,197 ft / 1,279 m
- Coordinates: 36°25′30.3″N 055°06′17.4″E

Map
- Location of airport in Iran

Runways
Direction	Length		Surface
Direction	ft	m	Surface
07/25	9,192	2,802	Asphalt
- Source: World Aero Data

Shahrud International Airport (IATA: RUD, ICAO: OIMJ) is an international airport located in Shahrud, Semnan Province, Iran. It is the largest airport of the province.

== Airlines and destinations ==
Airlines	Destinations
Qeshm Air	Tehran–Mehrabad
