= Air1Air =

Iranian airline

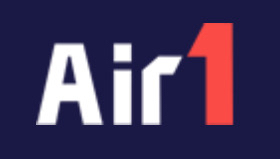
IATA	ICAO	Call sign
-	INA	AVICENNA
- Founded: 2017; 9 years ago
- Commenced operations: 2023; 3 years ago
- Hubs: Tehran Mehrabad International Airport
- Fleet size: 3
- Destinations: 9
- Headquarters: Azadi Square – Shahid Lashkari Highway Bypass – No. 43 – Meraj Building – 3rd Floor
- Key people: Samad Soleimani (CEO)
- Website: en.air1air.com

Air1Air (Persian: هواپیمایی اروان, Havâpeymâyi-ye Ervân) is an Iranian low-cost airline headquartered in Tehran. Owned by the Farhangian Reserve Fund, the airline was registered on 2017 and commenced its operations 6 years later in 2023. Air1Air is the only currently operating low-cost carrier in Iran. Its fleet consists of Boeing 737 aircraft, with an average fleet age of 29.6 years.

== History ==
Air1Air was first established on 14 February 2017 by the Farhangian Reserve Fund with the goal of becoming the country's first low-cost carrier. However, the airline did not commence operations for the next 6 years, having to obtain aircraft and the necessary flying permits required by Iran's Civil Aviation Organization. The airline was finally able to launch operations on 20 July 2023, officially entering the country's aviation industry.

== Fleet ==
=== Current fleet ===
As of July 2026, Air1Air operates the following aircraft:

Aircraft	In service	Orders	Passengers					Notes
Aircraft	In service	Orders	F	J	E	Y	Total	Notes
Boeing 737-300	1	—	—	—	—	130	130	—
Boeing 737-400	2	—	—	—	—	188	188	—
Total	3	—						

=== Former fleet ===
As of August 2025, Air1Air operated 1 Boeing 737-300 and 2 Boeing 737-400.
