= Sarakhs Airport =

- IATA: CKT; ICAO: OIMC

Summary
- Airport type: Public
- Owner: Astan Quds Razavi
- Location: Sarakhs, Razavi Khorasan Province, Iran
- Elevation AMSL: 945 ft (288 m)
- Coordinates: 36°30′04″N 061°03′54″E

Map
- Location of airport in Iran

Runways
| Direction | Length | | Surface |
| Direction | ft | m | Surface |
|---|---|---|---|
| 14/32 | 13,076 | 3,986 | Asphalt |
- Source: World Aero Data

Sarakhs Airport (IATA: CKT, ICAO: OIMC) is an airport in Sarakhs, Razavi Khorasan Province, Iran.

== Airlines and destinations ==
| Airlines | Destinations |
|---|---|
| Mahan Air | Tehran–Mehrabad |
