= Iranshahr Airport =

Iranshahr Airport ایرانشہر بالی پَٹ
- IATA: IHR; ICAO: OIZI

Summary
- Airport type: Public/Military
- Owner: Government of Iran
- Operator: Iran Airports Company; Islamic Revolutionary Guard Corps; Iranian Police Aviation
- Serves: Iranshahr
- Location: Iranshahr, Iran
- Elevation AMSL: 2,040 ft (620 m)
- Coordinates: 27°14′9″N 60°43′13″E

Map
- Location of airport in Iran

Runways
Direction	Length		Surface
Direction	ft	m	Surface
17/35	7,726	2,355	Asphalt

Statistics (۱۳۹۳–2014)
- Aircraft Movements: 298
- Passengers: 5,116 ▼6.3%
- Cargo: 38 tons ▼2.6%
- Source: Iranian Airports Holding Company

Iranshahr Airport (IATA: IHR, ICAO: OIZI) (Balochi: ایرانشہربالی پَٹ) is an airport serving Iranshahr, in Iran's Sistan and Baluchestan province.

On 16 July 2026, Iranian state media reported that the airport was hit by U.S. airstrikes as part of the 2026 Iran war.

== Airlines and destinations ==
Airlines	Destinations
Mahan Air	Jiroft, Tehran–Mehrabad
Pars Air	Tehran–Mehrabad
