= Khoy Airport =

Khoy Airport فرودگاه خوی
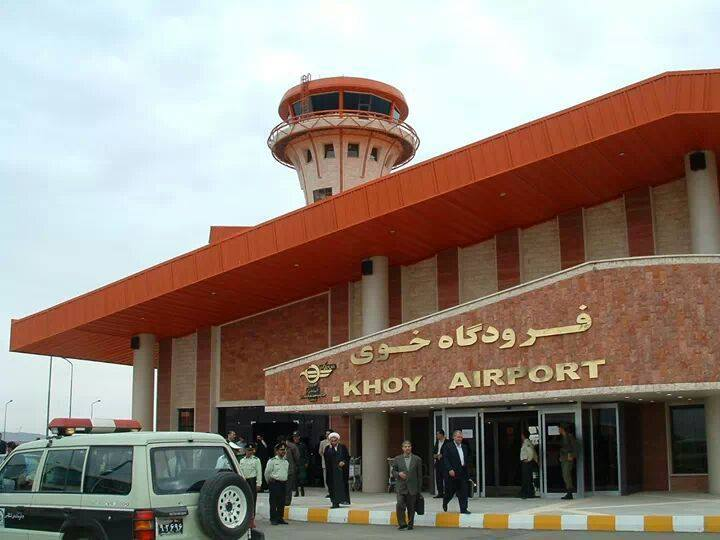
- IATA: KHY; ICAO: OITK

Summary
- Airport type: Public
- Owner: Government of Iran
- Operator: Iran Airports Company
- Location: Khoy, Iran
- Elevation AMSL: 3,981 ft / 1,213 m
- Coordinates: 38°25′38.83″N 044°58′24.87″E

Map
- Location of airport in Iran

Runways
Direction	Length		Surface
Direction	ft	m	Surface
15/33	9,190	2,801	Asphalt
- Source: World Aero Data

Khoy Airport (IATA: KHY, ICAO: OITK) is an airport that serves Khoy, in the north-western part of Iran. Khoy airport is a small airport with one runway measuring approximately 2,800 meters in length. The airport terminal is around a 20-minute drive from the city of Khoy.

== Airlines and destinations ==
Airlines	Destinations
Iran Air	Tehran–Mehrabad
