= Kalaleh Airport =

Airport in Kalaleh, Iran

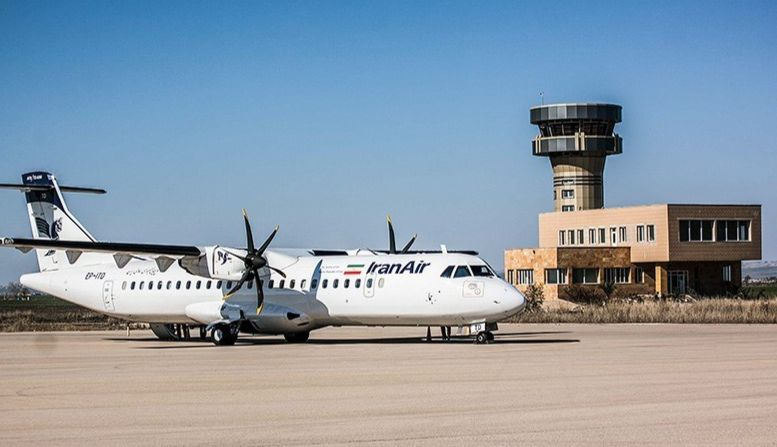
- IATA: KLM; ICAO: OINE

Summary
- Airport type: Public
- Owner: Government of Iran
- Operator: Iran Airports Company
- Serves: Kalaleh, Golestan Province
- Location: Kalaleh, Iran
- Elevation AMSL: 425 ft / 130 m
- Coordinates: 37°22′59.8″N 055°27′07.2″E

Map
- Location of airport in Iran

Runways
Direction	Length		Surface
Direction	ft	m	Surface
10/28	7,277	2,218	Asphalt
- Source: World Aero Data

Kalaleh Airport (IATA: KLM, ICAO: OINE) is an airport in Kalaleh, Golestan Province, Iran. A public airport, it is operated by Iran Airports Company.

== Airlines and destinations ==
Airlines	Destinations
Iran Air	Tehran–Mehrabad
