= Sanandaj Airport =

Sanandaj Airport فرودگاه سنندج
- IATA: SDG; ICAO: OICS

Summary
- Airport type: Public
- Owner: Government of Iran
- Operator: Iran Airports Company
- Serves: Sanandaj, Kurdistan
- Location: Sanandaj, Iran
- Elevation AMSL: 4,528 ft (1,380 m)
- Coordinates: 35°14′45.08″N 047°00′33.29″E

Map
- Location of airport in Iran

Runways
Direction	Length		Surface
Direction	ft	m	Surface
01/19	9,908y	3,020	Asphalt
- Source: World Aero Data

Sanandaj Airport (Persian: فرودگاه سنندج – Farūdegāh-e Sanandaj) (IATA: SDG, ICAO: OICS) is an airport serving the city of Sanandaj in the Kurdistan Province, Iran. The airport has a small number of domestic and regional destinations. This is a public airport operated by Iran Airports Company.

== Airlines and destinations ==
Airlines	Destinations
Pars Air	Tehran–Mehrabad
Mahan Air	Erbil (Kurdistan Region)
Qeshm Air	Tehran–Mehrabad

== Website ==
http://sanandaj.airport.ir/
