= Fly Kish =

Iranian airline

IATA	ICAO	Call sign
-	TKN	TOUCAN
- Founded: 2025
- Commenced operations: 2025
- Hubs: Kish International Airport; Mashhad Shahid Hasheminejad International Airport; Tehran Mehrabad International Airport
- Fleet size: 4
- Destinations: 17
- Headquarters: Kish Island, Persian Gulf, Iran
- Website: www.flykish.com

Fly Kish (Persian: فلای کیش) is an airline operating from Kish Island, Iran. It operates international, domestic and charter services as a scheduled carrier. Its main base is Kish International Airport and Mehrabad International Airport, Tehran.

== History ==
Fly Kish was founded in the year of 2025 and commenced operations in mid-2025, which was operating the Boeing 737-300. At the end of 2025 the airline took up its first MD 88. At the end of 2025 the airline added a route to Yerevan in Armenia.

== Fleet ==
=== Current fleet ===
As of July 2026, Fly Kish operates the following aircraft:

Aircraft	In service	Orders	Passengers
Boeing 737-300	2	—	
McDonnell Douglas MD-82	1	—	
McDonnell Douglas MD-88	1	—	
Total	4	—	

== Destinations ==
Country	City	notes
Armenia	Yerevan	
Iran	Asaluyeh	
Iran	Bushehr	
Iran	Chabahar	
Iran	Kish Island	
Iran	Ilam	
Iran	Isfahan	
Iran	Mashhad	
Iran	Qeshm	
Iran	Rasht	
Iran	Tehran	
Iran	Shiraz	
Iran	Yazd	
Iraq	Baghdad	
Iraq	Najaf	
Georgia	Tbilisi	
Turkey	Istanbul	

== See also ==
- List of airlines of Iran
