= Semnan Municipal Airport =

Airport in Semnan, iran

Semnan international Airport فرودگاه بین‌المللی سمنان
- IATA: SNX; ICAO: OIIS

Summary
- Airport type: Public
- Owner: Government of Iran
- Operator: Iran Airports Company
- Location: Semnan Province, Iran
- Elevation AMSL: 1,134 m / 3,719 ft
- Coordinates: 35°35′41″N 053°29′43″E
- Website: http://semnan.airport.ir

Map
- Location of airport in Iran

Runways
Direction	Length		Surface
Direction	m	ft	Surface
04/22	3,578	11,739	Asphalt
- Source: IATA

Semnan International Airport (Persian: فرودگاه بین‌المللی سمنان, lit. 'Forūdgāh-e bin elmelali Semnān') (IATA: SNX, ICAO: OIIS) is an airport serving the city of Semnan, in the Semnan Province of Iran.

== Development ==
This airport did not have adequate facilities for scheduled commercial passenger service, but was utilized for charter flights to and from the city. However, the airport has received significant renovation and now consists of a passenger terminal and an arrival building.

The construction of the airport's air traffic control tower was finished and commenced operations in the Summer of 2011.

The airport also offers scheduled flights to the cities of western Iran for religious pilgrimages that will continue to Iraq, Syria and Saudi Arabia.

The airport hopes to establish direct flight routes to Karbala, Iraq; Najaf, Iraq; Damascus, Syria; and the Kingdom of Saudi Arabia as soon as the international situation allows the proper atmosphere for such services.

Some of the wealthy agribusiness managers also utilize the airport for the domestic transportation of their crops. The Semnan Municipal Airport is accessible via the A83 highway, and is situated a few kilometers east of the Islamic Azad University, itself only a few kilometers east of the city boundaries.
