= Bishe Kola Airbase =

- IATA: BSM; ICAO: OINJ

Summary
- Airport type: Military
- Owner/Operator: Islamic Republic of Iran Air Force
- Location: Amol, Iran
- Elevation AMSL: −79 ft / −24 m
- Coordinates: 36°39′19″N 52°20′59″E

Map
- Location in Iran

Runways
Direction	Length		Surface
Direction	ft	m	Surface
09/27	3,235	986	Asphalt
- Sources: World Aero Data

Bishe Kola Airbase (IATA: BSM, ICAO: OINJ) is a military airport located in Bisheh Kola near Amol, Iran.

== See also ==
- List of airports in Iran
