= Birjand International Airport =

Birjand International Airport فرودگاه بین المللی بیرجند
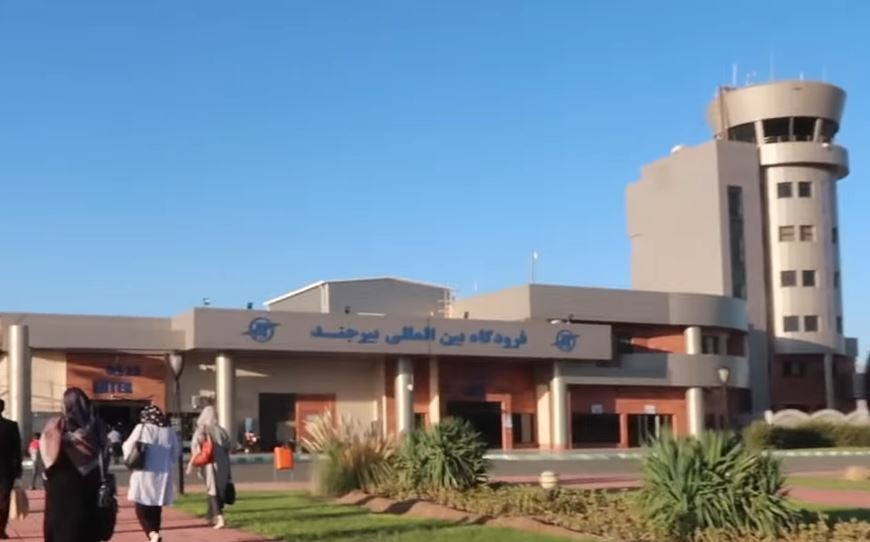
- IATA: XBJ; ICAO: OIMB

Summary
- Airport type: Public/Military
- Owner: Government of Iran
- Operator: Iran Airports Company; Iranian Air Force
- Serves: Birjand, South Khorasan
- Location: Birjand, Iran
- Elevation AMSL: 4,952 ft (1,509 m)
- Coordinates: 32°53′33″N 59°17′00″E
- Website: birjand.airport.ir

Map
- Location of airport in Iran

Runways
Direction	Length		Surface
Direction	ft	m	Surface
08/26	7,093	2,162	Asphalt
10/28	13,123	4,000	Asphalt

Birjand Airport (IATA: XBJ, ICAO: OIMB) is a small airport near Birjand, Iran. Due to the geopolitical eminence of Birjand in the eastern parts of Iran, Birjand airport started operation in 1933 as the 3rd operational airport in Iran. Birjand airport offers non-stop daily flights to Tehran and Mashhad.

Birjand airport was established in 1933, beginning with small aircraft. The first passenger terminal was opened in 1976, and the same year saw the first flights from and to Mashhad as well as Tehran by Pars Air, the precursor of Iran Aseman Airlines.

== History ==
Birjand Airport is a small airport near Birjand, Iran. Due to the geopolitical eminence of Birjand in the eastern parts of Iran, Birjand airport started operation in 1933 as the 3rd operational airport in Iran. Birjand airport offers non-stop daily flights to Tehran and Mashhad. Birjand airport was established in 1933 but there were only flights for very small airplanes. There were no passenger terminals till 1354 Hejri-Shamsi (1975). The first passenger terminal was established in 1355 Hejri-Shamsi and flights from Mashhad and Tehran to Birjand were opened in 1355 Hejri-Shamsi by Pars-Air (Aseman) and Iran-air agencies. The chief executive of the airport was Mr Habibollah Dehghan Noudeh between 1342 and 1362, he did hard working to build a modernized airport in Birjand. Mr Dehghan Noudeh did great efforts to make Birjand airport as one of important airports in Iran. In his era a passenger terminal, cargo terminal, police station, weather forecast station, and many other buildings including administration and office building, air control tower also were built. Due to his effort the flights were opened from Tehran and Mashhad to Birjand for the first time in 1355 (Hejri-shamsi) by Pars Air (Asseman) and also it was about to start Iran Air flights from Tehran to Birjand before 1357. Birjand airport became an international airport after the first international flight to Medina, KSA in June 2008. In 2009, the runway 10/28 was refurbished and extended to 4000 meters to accommodate larger aircraft. During that time, Iran Aseman used the older runway 08/26 for the daily flights to Tehran.

In February 2012, Birjand International Airport saw the first traffic by a large aircraft, Iran Air's Airbus 300, on a test flight in order to prepare for Hajj traffic.

Birjand Airport has since opened a second passenger terminal to for the increasing number of passengers.

== Airlines and destinations ==
Airlines	Destinations
Iran Air	Mashhad, Tehran–Mehrabad; Seasonal: Jeddah, Medina
Iran Airtour	Tehran–Mehrabad
Mahan Air	Tehran–Mehrabad
Pars Air	Tehran–Mehrabad
Yazd Airways	Tehran–Mehrabad
