= Zanjan Airport =

Zanjan International Airport
- IATA: JWN; ICAO: OITZ

Summary
- Airport type: Public
- Owner: Government of Iran
- Operator: Iran Airports Company
- Location: Zanjan, Iran
- Elevation AMSL: 5,382 ft / 1,640 m
- Coordinates: 36°46′25.1″N 048°21′33.9″E

Map
- Location of airport in Iran

Runways
Direction	Length		Surface
Direction	ft	m	Surface
12/30	9,840	2,999	Asphalt
- Source: World Aero Data

Zanjan Airport (IATA: JWN, ICAO: OITZ) is an airport serving the city of Zanjan, in Iran's province of the same name.

== Airlines and destinations ==
Airlines	Destinations
Iran Air	Seasonal: Jeddah, Medina
Kish Air	Kish, Tehran–Mehrabad
Mahan Air	Mashhad
