= Rafsanjan Airport =

- IATA: RJN; ICAO: OIKR

Summary
- Airport type: Public
- Owner: Government of Iran
- Operator: Iran Airports Company
- Location: Rafsanjan, Iran
- Elevation AMSL: 5,298 ft (1,615 m)
- Coordinates: 30°17′51.774″N 056°03′04.10″E

Map
- Location of airport in Iran

Runways
Direction	Length		Surface
Direction	ft	m	Surface
11/29	9,814	2,991	Asphalt
- Source: World Aero Data

Rafsanjan Airport (IATA: RJN, ICAO: OIKR) is an airport in the city of Rafsanjan, in Iran's Kerman province.

The airport is suitable for domestic flights. This airport has dedicated a service for the comfort of passengers going to and from the airport.

== Airlines and destinations ==
Airlines	Destinations
Asa Jet	Tehran–Mehrabad
Varesh Airlines	Tehran–Mehrabad
