= Fasa Airport =

Fasa Airport فرودگاه فسا
- IATA: FAZ; ICAO: OISF

Summary
- Airport type: Public
- Owner: Government of Iran
- Operator: Iran Airports Company
- Serves: Fasa, Iran
- Elevation AMSL: 4,261 ft (1,299 m)
- Coordinates: 28°53′30″N 053°43′24″E

Map
- Location of airport in Iran

Runways
Direction	Length		Surface
Direction	m	ft	Surface
14/32	1,982	6,503	Asphalt
- Source: DAFIF

Fasa Airport (Persian: فرودگاه فسا) (IATA: FAZ, ICAO: OISF) is an airport serving Fasa, a city in the Fars province in Iran. A public airport, it is operated by Iran Airports Company.

== Facilities ==
The airport is at an elevation of 4,261 feet (1,299 m) above mean sea level. It has one runway designated 14/32 with an asphalt surface measuring 1,982 by 30 metres (6,503 ft × 98 ft).
