= Bojnord Airport =

Bojnord Airport فرودگاه بجنورد
- IATA: BJB; ICAO: OIMN

Summary
- Airport type: Public
- Owner: Government of Iran
- Operator: Iran Airports Company
- Serves: Bojnord, North Khorasan
- Location: Bojnord, Iran
- Elevation AMSL: 3,499 ft (1,066 m)
- Coordinates: 37°29′35″N 57°18′30″E
- Website: bojnord.airport.ir

Map
- Location of airport in Iran

Runways
Direction	Length		Surface
Direction	m	ft	Surface
07/25	4,420	14,501	Asphalt

Bojnord Airport (Persian: فرودگاه بجنورد) (IATA: BJB, ICAO: OIMN) is an airport serving Bojnord (also spelled Bojnourd or Bojnurd), the capital city of the North Khorasan province in Iran.

== Facilities ==
The airport is at an elevation of 3,499 feet (1,066 m) above mean sea level. It has one runway designated 07/25 with an asphalt surface measuring 4,420 by 45 metres (14,501 ft × 148 ft). ILS (Instrument landing system) is installed at Bojnord Airport.

== Airlines and destinations ==
Airlines	Destinations
Iran Air	Tehran–Mehrabad
Iran Aseman Airlines	Tehran–Mehrabad
Mahan Air	Tehran–Mehrabad
