= Bam Airport =

- IATA: BXR; ICAO: OIKM

Summary
- Owner: Government of Iran
- Operator: Iran Airports Company
- Location: Bam, Iran
- Elevation AMSL: 3,231 ft / 985 m
- Coordinates: 29°05′03.01″N 58°27′00.15″E

Map
- Location of airport in Iran

Runways
Direction	Length		Surface
Direction	ft	m	Surface
12/30	11,107	3,385	Asphalt
- Source: World Aero Data

Bam Airport is an airport to the east of city of Bam, in Kerman province, Iran (IATA: BXR, ICAO: OIKM).

== Airlines and destinations ==
Airlines	Destinations
Qeshm Air	Tehran–Mehrabad
