= Saravan Airport =

Airport in Iran

- IATA: SAR; ICAO: OIZS

Summary
- Airport type: Public
- Location: Saravan, Iran
- Elevation AMSL: 3,930 ft / 1,198 m
- Coordinates: 27°25′08″N 62°18′59″E

Map
- Location of airport in Iran

Runways
Direction	Length		Surface
Direction	ft	m	Surface
13/31	7,103	2,165	Asphalt
- Sources: DoD FLIP

Saravan Airport (ICAO: OIZS) is an airport serving Saravan in the Sistan and Baluchestan province in Iran.

== Airlines and destinations ==
Airlines	Destinations
Mahan Air	Mashhad, Tehran–Mehrabad
