= Kashan Airport =

Airport in Iran

Kashan Airport فرودگاه کاشان
- IATA: KKS; ICAO: OIFK

Summary
- Airport type: Public/Military
- Owner: Islamic Revolutionary Guard Corps
- Operator: Islamic Revolutionary Guard Corps; Iran Airports Company
- Serves: Kashan, Isfahan
- Location: Kashan, Iran
- Elevation AMSL: 3,465 ft / 1,056 m
- Coordinates: 33°53′43.20″N 051°34′37.36″E
- Website: kashanairport.ir

Map
- Location of airport in Iran

Runways
Direction	Length		Surface
Direction	ft	m	Surface
11/29	11,342	3,457	Asphalt

Kashan Airport (IATA: KKS, ICAO: OIFK) (Persian: فرودگاه کاشان) is one of the oldest airports in Iran, which became operational in 1954. The airport is 12 kilometers southeast of the city of Kashan, between the two main and transit roads, Kashan–Isfahan and Kashan–Yazd, as well as near the Tehran – Bandar Abbas railway line to the south of the pass.

== History ==
In 1973 the decision was taken to build the airport in the city of Kashan. For this purpose, a land area of about 800 hectares in the southeast of Kashan was selected. The actions in a short time to build a 2700-meter and 45 meter band and a few aircraft taxi and parking aircraft capable of heavy-duty park and a pavilion building, the led. On 13 June 1954 the President sitting in a Fokker 28, carrying the time the airport was open and operating effectively. Kashan municipalities continue and complete the construction of the airport and construction of a passenger terminal building with an area of 800 square meters and the infrastructure required to accomplish that, according to the Corps Aerospace Force, Iranian Revolutionary Guards airport was Kashan delivery.

In 1973, flight and landing permits were issued for Kashan airport. This license is for domestic flights and days. Prepare and equip the airport to fly by the city of Kashan Kashan performed under the supervision of the Civil Aviation Authority has ended.

On 4 September 1974, Tehran test flight was conducted in Kashan and vice versa by the airline Air dynamic aircraft Antonov 74 aircraft it was. The flight and airport proximity in order to control inputs and outputs of projects carried airport. During the flight for 1.5 hours. Reports received from the flight, was confirmed as positive.

The airport reopened on 2 June 2016 after twenty years hiatus with flight from Mashhad International Airport by ATA Airlines. The airport now has flights to Kish Island in south of Iran. Iran Air, The national flag carrier of Iran, plans Shiraz and Mashhad launch in 2018 from Kashan Airport.
