= Hamadan International Airport =

- IATA: HDM; ICAO: OIHH

Summary
- Airport type: Public/Military
- Owner: Government of Iran
- Operator: Iran Airports Company; Islamic Republic of Iran Air Force
- Serves: Hamadan
- Location: Hamadan, Iran
- Elevation AMSL: 5,755 ft (1,754 m)
- Coordinates: 34°52′09″N 048°33′09″E

Map
- Location of airport in Iran

Runways
Direction	Length		Surface
Direction	ft	m	Surface
10/28	10,611	3,234	Asphalt
- Source: World Aero Data

Hamadan International Airport (Persian: فرودگاه بین المللی همدان) is an airport in Hamadan, Iran (IATA: HDM, ICAO: OIHH). The significance of this airport is the unusual shape of the runway. The runway goes uphill for the first half and downhill the second half.

== Airlines and destinations ==
Airlines	Destinations
Caspian Airlines	Mashhad
Iran Air	Tehran–Mehrabad; Seasonal: Jeddah, Medina
