= Jask Airport =

Jask Airport فرودگاه هفت آذر بندر جاسک
- IATA: JSK; ICAO: OIZJ

Summary
- Airport type: Military
- Owner: Islamic Republic of Iran Navy
- Operator: Islamic Republic of Iran Navy Aviation
- Serves: Jask, Hormozgan
- Location: Jask, Iran
- Elevation AMSL: 32 ft / 10 m
- Coordinates: 25°39′13″N 057°47′57″E

Map
- Location of airport in Iran

Runways
Direction	Length		Surface
Direction	ft	m	Surface
06/24	7,677	2,340	Asphalt
- Sources: DoD FLIP

Jask Airport (Persian: فرودگاه جاسک) (IATA: JSK, ICAO: OIZJ) is an airport near the city of Jask, in Hormozgan province, Iran.

== Airlines and destinations ==
Airlines	Destinations
Caspian Airlines	Tehran–Mehrabad
Mahan Air	Tehran–Mehrabad
Pars Air	Shiraz
