= Yasuj Airport =

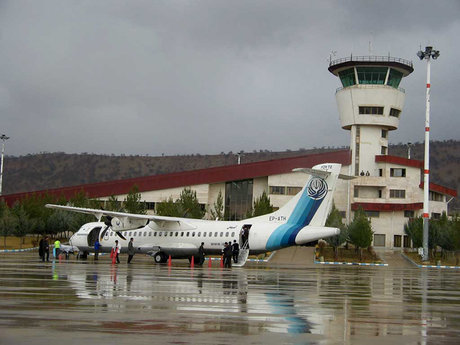
- IATA: YES; ICAO: OISY

Summary
- Airport type: Public
- Owner: Government of Iran
- Operator: Iran Airports Company
- Serves: Yasuj, Kohgiluyeh and Boyer-Ahmad
- Location: Yasuj, Iran
- Elevation AMSL: 5,939 ft / 1,810 m
- Coordinates: 30°42′02″N 051°32′42″E

Map
- Location of airport in Iran

Runways
Direction	Length		Surface
Direction	m	ft	Surface
13/31	2,598	8,522	Asphalt
- Source: DAFIF

Yasuj Airport (IATA: YES, ICAO: OISY) is an airport serving Yasuj, a city in the Zagros Mountains of southwestern Iran, and capital of the Kohgiluyeh and Boyer-Ahmad Province. A public airport, it is operated by Iran Airports Company.

== Airlines and destinations ==
Airlines	Destinations
Mahan Air	Tehran–Mehrabad
Pars Air	Tehran–Mehrabad

== Accidents ==
On 18 February 2018, Iran Aseman Airlines Flight 3704 from Tehran Mehrabad International Airport to Yasuj crashed; all 65 passengers on board were presumed to be killed. Initial reports revealed that the aircraft collided into Mount Dena due to bad weather. The caused of the crash is currently under investigation.
