= Abu Musa Airport =

Abu Musa Airport فرودگاه ابوموسی
- IATA: AEU; ICAO: OIBA

Summary
- Airport type: Public/Military
- Owner: Government of Iran
- Operator: Iran Airports Company; Islamic Revolutionary Guard Corps
- Serves: Abu Musa, Hormozgan
- Location: Abu Musa Island, Iran
- Elevation AMSL: 23 ft (7.0 m)
- Coordinates: 25°52′32″N 055°01′58″E

Map
- Location of airport in Iran

Runways
Direction	Length		Surface
Direction	m	ft	Surface
08/26	2,986	9,797	Asphalt

Statistics (2017)
- Aircraft Movements: 376 ▲84%
- Passengers: 37,357 ▲85%
- Cargo: 398 tons ▲100%
- Source: Iran Airports Company

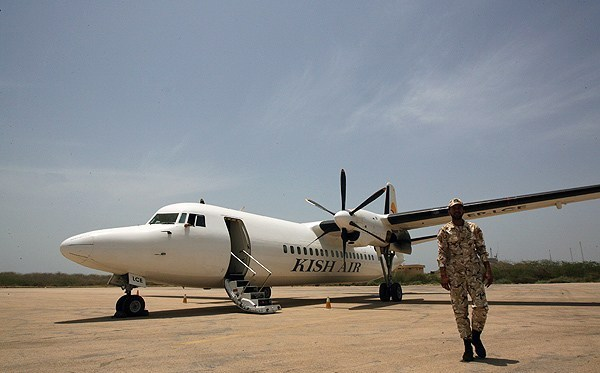
Abu Musa Airport

Abu Musa Airport (IATA: AEU, ICAO: OIBA) (Persian: فرودگاه ابوموسی) is a regional airport located in near of city of Abu Musa, Hormozgan Province, in south of Iran in Persian Gulf. A public/military airport, it is owned by Iran Airports Company.

== Airlines and destinations ==
Airlines	Destinations
Iran Air	Bandar Abbas
Karun Airlines	Bandar Abbas
Pouya Air	Bandar Abbas

== Facilities ==
The airport resides at an elevation of 23 feet (7 m) above mean sea level. It has one runway designated 08/26 with an asphalt surface measuring 2,986 by 45 metres (9,797 ft × 148 ft).
