= Yazd Airways =

Iranian airline

Yazd Airways هواپیمایی یزد Havâpeymâyi-ye Yazd

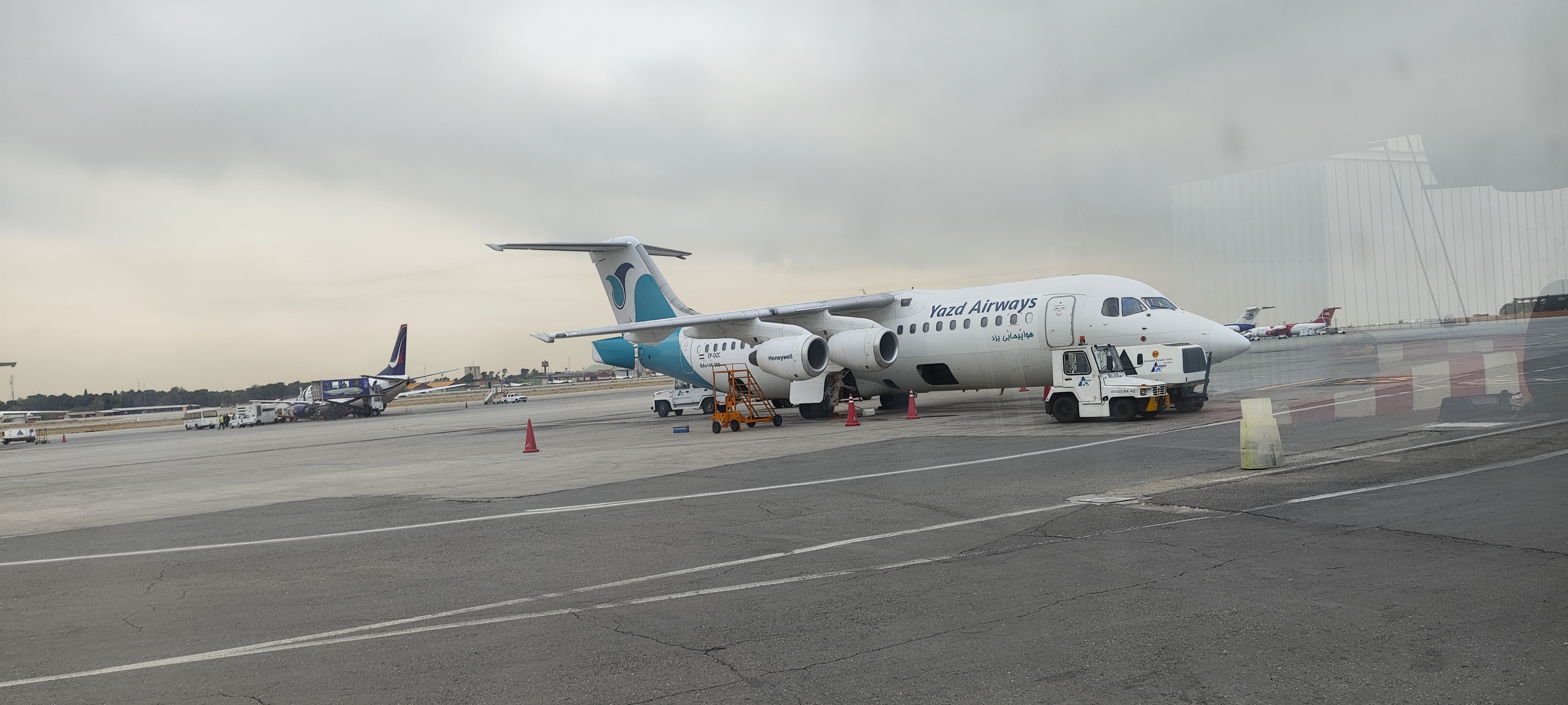
- Yazd Airways BAe 146, Mehrabad Airport
IATA	ICAO	Call sign
-	DZD	YAZD AIRWAYS
- Founded: 2022; 4 years ago
- Commenced operations: February 2023; 3 years ago
- Operating bases: Tehran Imam Khomeini International Airport; Tehran Mehrabad Airport; Yazd Shahid Sadooghi Airport
- Fleet size: 5
- Destinations: 7
- Parent company: Sepehr Kaveh Kish Co.
- Headquarters: Yazd, Iran
- Website: https://www.yazdairways.com

Yazd Airways (Persian: هواپیمایی یزد, Havâpeymâyi-ye Yazd) is a private Iranian airline based in Yazd. It operates scheduled domestic flights in Iran as well as international flights to Dubai, Najaf, Istanbul, and Mumbai.

== History ==
Yazd Airways was founded in 2022 and commenced operations in 2023. Its inaugural flight was from Yazd to Tehran on an Avro RJ 85.

In 2025 the US government sanctioned Yazd Airways along with the Gambian company Macka. After an audit in 2025, the airline was able to resume operations.

== Fleet ==
=== Current fleet ===
As of October 2026, Yazd Airways fleet consists of the following aircraft:

Yazd Airways Fleet
Aircraft	In service	Parked
Airbus A310		2
British Aerospace 146	2	1
Total	5	
