= Iran Airports Company =

Holding and operating company for air navigation and civilian airports in Iran

Iran Airports and Air Navigation Company
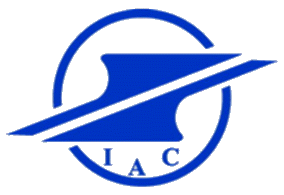
- Abbreviation: IAC
- Formation: 1991
- Legal status: State-owned enterprise
- Location: Mehrabad International Airport
- Region served: Iran
- Chief executive: Mohammad Amirani
- Parent organization: Ministry of Roads and Urban Development
- Website: Official website

The Iran Airports and Air Navigation Company (IAC) (Persian: شركت فرودگاه‌ها و ناوبری هوایی ایران) is the holding and operating company for civilian airports and managing the air navigation in Iran. Its headquarters are located at Tehran's Mehrabad International Airport and it has offices at all airports in Iran.

== Former managing directors ==
1. Hassan Abedini
2. Hossein Akramiyan Arani
3. Abbas Ariaei Pour
4. Hossein Ghasemi
5. Asghar Ketabchi (first time)
6. Gholam Abbas Arasmesh
7. Nourollah Rezaei Niaraki
8. Mohammad Hassan Pasvar
9. Asghar Ketabchi (second time)
10. Seyed Ahmad Momeni Rokh
11. Mohsen Esmaeili (2009–2012)
12. Mahmoud Rasouli Nejad
13. Esmaeil Tabadar
14. Mohammad Ali Ilkhaani
15. Rahmatolah Mahabadi
16. Siavash AmirMokri
17. Hamid Reza Seyedi
18. Reza Nakhjavani
19. Mohammad Amirani (current)

== Owned airports ==
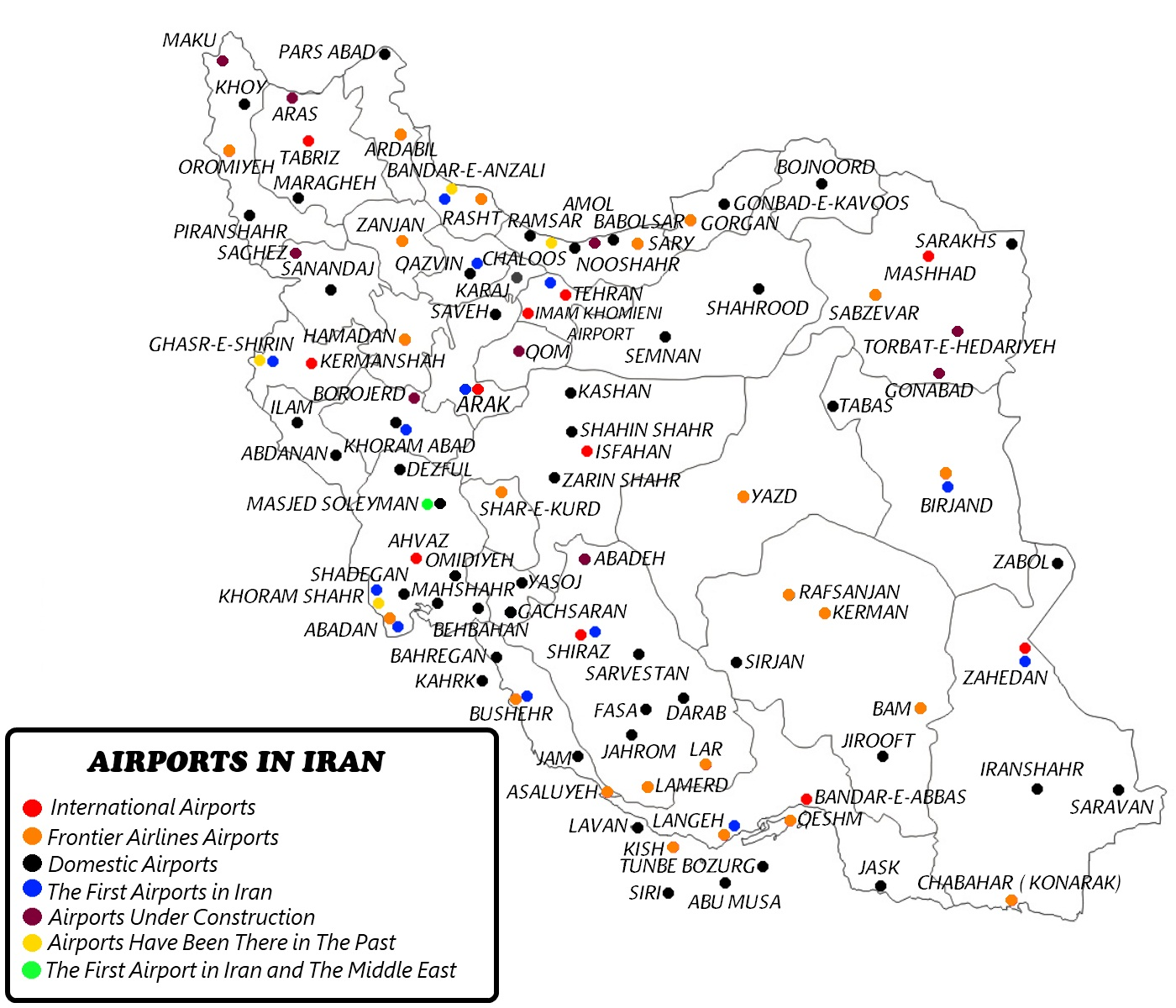
Airports in Iran

=== International airports ===
1. Tehran j Khomeini International Airport
2. Mehrabad International Airport
3. Mashhad International Airport
4. Isfahan International Airport
5. Shiraz International Airport
6. Tabriz International Airport
7. Bandar Abbas International Airport
8. Zahedan Airport
9. Yazd Shahid Sadooghi Airport
10. Ahvaz International Airport
11. Ayatollah Hashemi Rafsanjani Airport

=== Air border airports ===
1. Arak Airport
2. Ardabil Airport
3. Urmia Airport
4. Ilam Airport
5. Bojnord Airport
6. Bandar Lengeh Airport
7. Birjand International Airport
8. Khorramabad Airport
9. Rasht Airport
10. Rafsanjan Airport
11. Zanjan Airport
12. Sari Airport
13. Sabzevar Airport
14. Sanandaj Airport
15. Shahrekord Airport
16. Kermanshah Airport
17. Gorgan Airport
18. Larestan Airport
19. Lamerd International Airport
20. Hamadan International Airport
21. Shahroud Airport
22. Bushehr Airport
23. Abadan International Airport

=== Domestic airports ===
1. Abu Musa Airport
2. Iranshahr Airport
3. Bam Airport
4. Parsabad Airport
5. Jahrom Airport
6. Jiroft Airport
7. Khoy Airport
8. Darab Airport
9. Ramsar International Airport
10. Zabol Airport
11. Zarghan Airport
12. Saravan Airport
13. Semnan Airport
14. Sahand Airport
15. Sirjan Airport
16. Tabas Airport
17. Fasa Airport
18. Kalaleh Airport
19. Noshahr Airport
20. Yasuj Airport

== See also ==
- Iran Civil Aviation Organization
- Transport in Iran
- List of airports in Iran
- List of the busiest airports in Iran
- List of airlines of Iran
