= Mehrabad International Airport =

Airport in Tehran, Iran

Mehrabad Airport فرودگاه بین‌المللی مهرآباد Foroudgâh-e Beynolmelali-ye Mehrâbâd
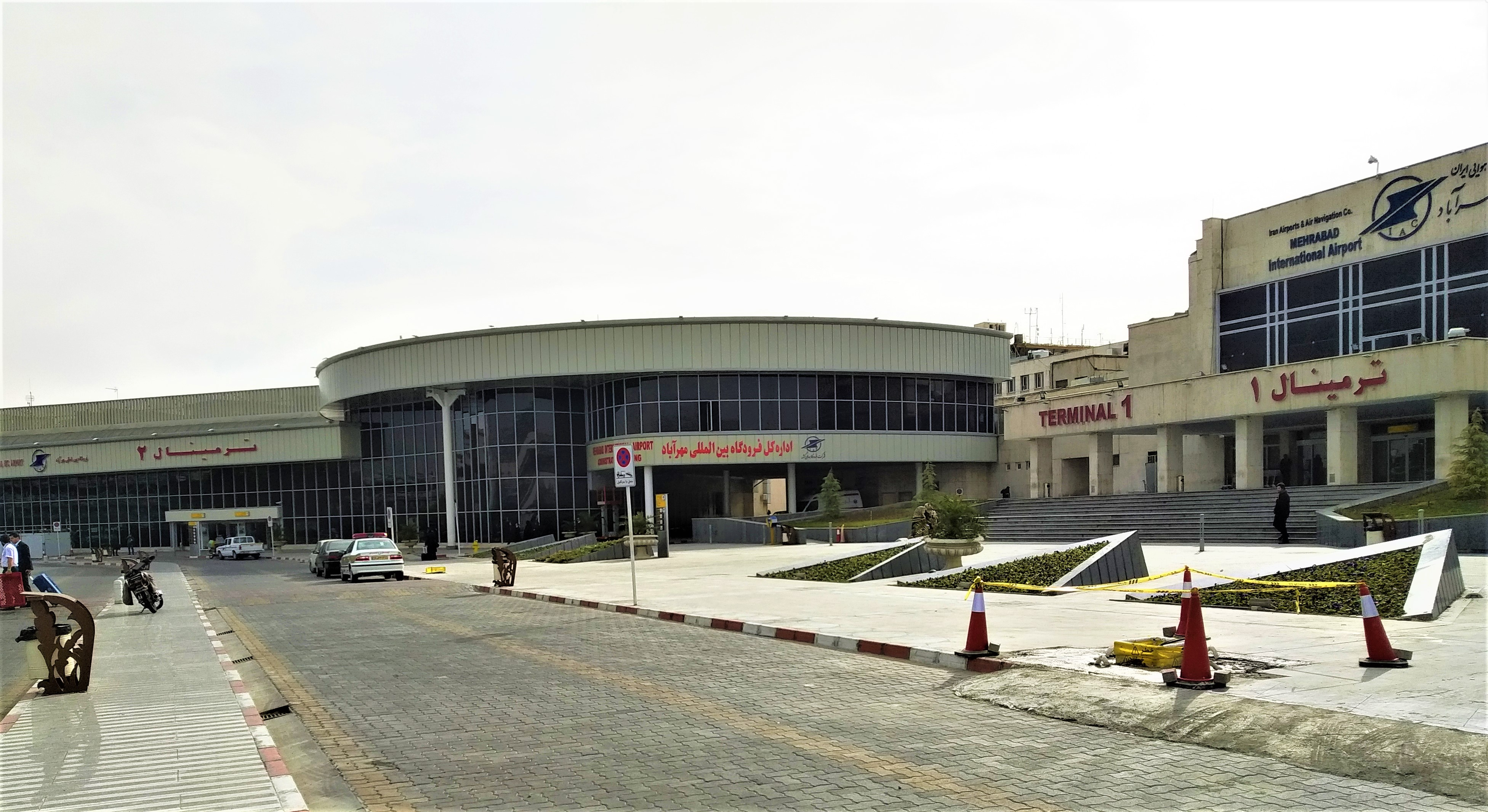
- IATA: THR; ICAO: OIII

Summary
- Airport type: Public / military
- Owner: Government of Iran
- Operator: Iran Airports Company; Iranian Air Force; Islamic Republic of Iran Army Aviation; Islamic Revolutionary Guard Corps; Iranian Police Aviation
- Serves: Tehran metropolitan area
- Location: Tehran, Iran
- Opened: 1938; 88 years ago
- Hub for: Air1Air; Asa Jet; ATA Airlines; AVA Airlines; Caspian Airlines; Chabahar Airlines; FlyPersia; Iran Air; Iran Airtour; Iran Aseman Airlines; Karun Airlines; Kish Air; Mahan Air; Meraj Airlines; Pars Air; Pouya Air; Qeshm Air; Saha Airlines; Sepehran Airlines; Taban Air; Varesh Airlines; Yazd Airways; Zagros Airlines
- Elevation AMSL: 3,962 ft (1,208 m)
- Coordinates: 35°41′21″N 51°18′49″E
- Website: www.mehrabad.airport.ir

Maps
- Location of airport in Iran
- Interactive map of Mehrabad Airport

Runways
Direction	Length		Surface
Direction	ft	m	Surface
11L/29R	13,087	3,989	Asphalt
11R/29L	13,258	4,041	Asphalt

Statistics (2017)
- Aircraft movements: 142,037 ▲7%
- Passengers: 17,464,216 ▲7%
- Cargo: 120,467 tons ▲8%
- Source: Iran Airports Company

Tehran Mehrabad International Airport (IATA: THR, ICAO: OIII) – commonly known as Mehrabad Airport – is an airport located in the city of Tehran, the capital of Iran. Formerly serving as the city's primary airport for both domestic and international flights, it now primarily handles domestic traffic following the opening of Imam Khomeini International Airport for international flights in 2007. Despite this, Mehrabad remains the busiest airport in Iran by passenger volume and aircraft movements.

The airport opened in 1938 and serves as Iran's main airport. Since its establishment it has been the busiest airport in the country. In 2017, it handled 17,464,216 passengers. The airport is also used by the Government of Iran, and is one of the bases of the Islamic Republic of Iran Air Force. It is capable of accommodating various types of aircraft. Mehrabad is operated by the Iran Airports and Air Navigation Company and remains critical to the country's aviation network. It plays a strategic role in domestic connectivity and government aviation operations.

Mehrabad Airport serves 60 nonstop destinations through 23 airlines as of 2025. It is largely served by Iran Air, the flag carrier and largest airline in the country. The airport has four active terminals, built throughout different time periods in order to reach the airport's capacity.

== History ==
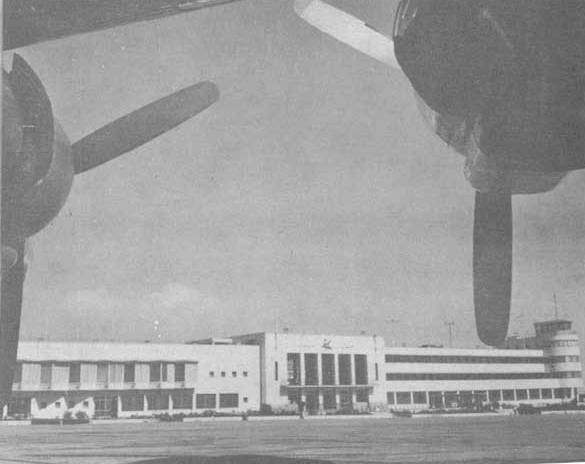
Mehrabad Airport in 1973

The site was originally called Base-J and was the site of the Imperial Iranian Army's first Armored and Mechanized artillery forces provided by the Czechoslovak Škoda Works, under the command of General Mahmud Mir-Djalali (grandfather of Pierre Omidyar).

=== 1938–1954 ===
The airport was used for the first time as an airfield for aviation club planes in 1938. During World War II it became a stopover point for the U.S. Air Transport Command. After the war, along with becoming internationally recognized by joining the Iranian civil aviation organization to the ICAO in 1949, the airport also became an air force base.

=== 1955–1978 ===
In 1955 just after the construction of the first asphalt-paved runway, a new terminal building (current Terminal 1) for both international and domestic flights was designed and constructed. In April 1956 Lockheed T-33 Shooting Stars (T-33As) trainer aircraft began arriving for the Imperial Iranian Air Force. In May 1957 these were followed by Republic F-84 Thunderjet (F-84Gs) fighter.

In May 1975, Iran Air started flying to New York via London with a Boeing 707. The airline launched direct service to New York using Boeing 747SPs the following June. The construction of a new airport commenced 35 kilometres (22 mi) from Tehran in 1977. The city was growing around Mehrabad, and the airfield was witnessing high amounts of traffic. Between 1970 and 1976, passenger counts had risen from 900,000 to 3,020,000.

=== 1979–2007 ===
On 24 January 1979, the military took control of Mehrabad and other airports in the country in an attempt to prevent Ayatollah Ruhollah Khomeini's return from exile in Paris. It ultimately relented and permitted his arrival at Mehrabad aboard a chartered Air France plane eight days later.

At the beginning of the Iran–Iraq War in September 1980, Iraq carried out an air strike on the airport. In the 1980s, Mehrabad's route network spanned from Paris to Beijing.

By 2000, the airport was serving nine million passengers annually, in addition to military flights. Due to the congestion, airlines advised travellers to arrive at Mehrabad three hours prior to departure. The new airport, now called Imam Khomeini International Airport, opened in 2004. However, political factors delayed the transfer of all international flights to the new facility. All international flights had moved to Imam Khomeini Airport by March 2008.

=== 2008–present ===
After the transfer of all International flights to Imam Khomeini, Mehrabad became solely for domestic traffic. Despite this, it has faced being overcrowded with the expansion of air travel in the country. In 2015 a proposal for a seventh terminal at Mehrabad was made, with plans to open a new twenty-gate terminal located between terminal 1, 2, 4, 6. The proposal estimated completion of this expansion by 2020, however construction never began and it is unclear if the proposal will move forward.

In 2019, a proposal to transfer domestic flights to Imam Khomeini airport was made. However it was abandoned and has not been officially considered due it being protested by Iranians and Tehranis as it would require a longer travel from the city to the further Imam Khomeini airport.

During the Twelve-Day War (June 2025) between Iran and Israel, the airport was closed after explosions at the site on 14 June 2025. An Israeli airstrike at the airport hit two Iranian F-14 fighter jets with one of those being destroyed.

On 3 March 2026, during the 2026 Iran war, the Mehrabad Airport was hit in an Israeli airstrike.

== Operations ==
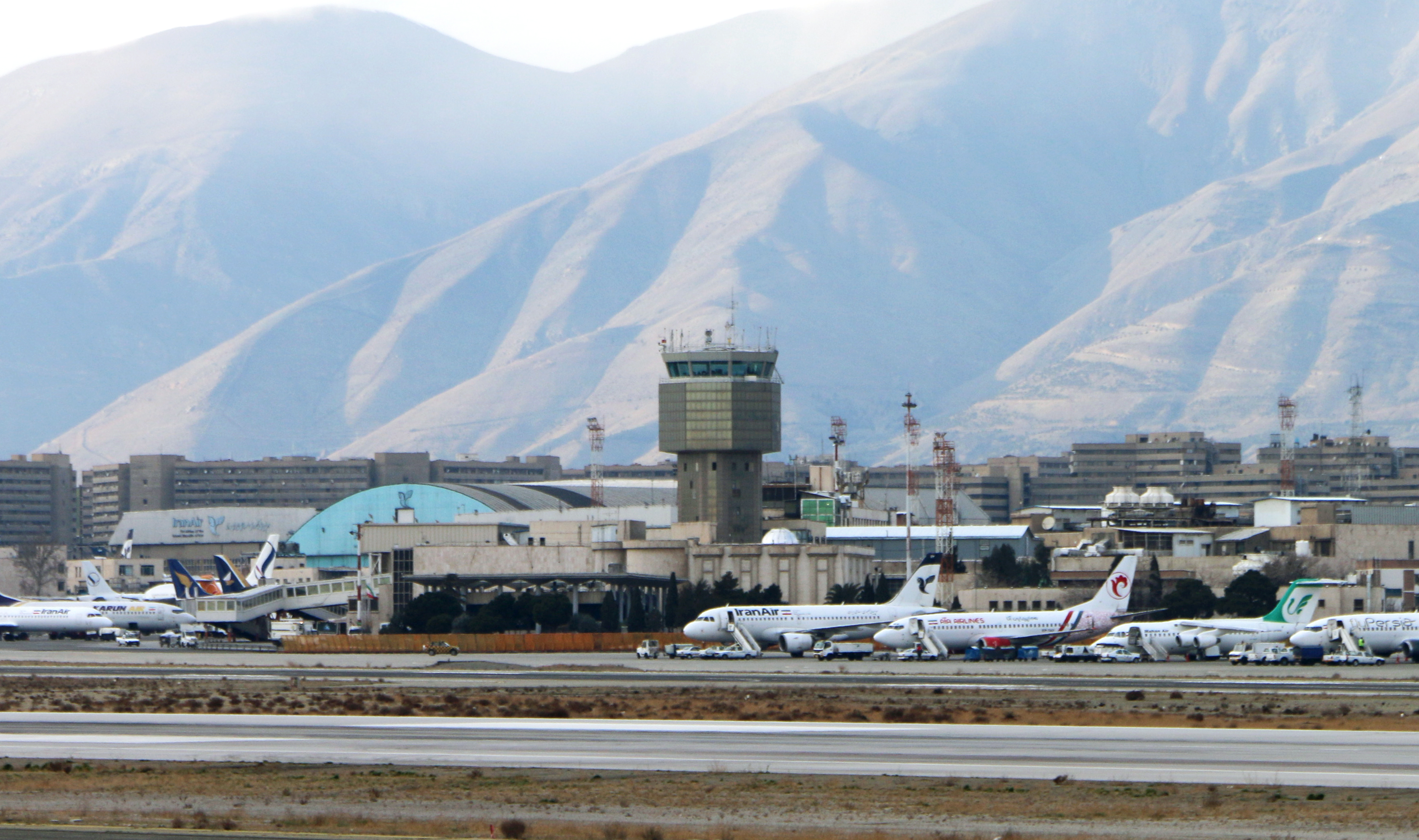
Mehrabad Airport in 2024

Mehrabad Airport handles only domestic flights. Between March 2022 and March 2023, the airport received 12.3 million passengers.

== Terminals and facilities ==
Mehrabad International Airport consists of four terminals.

=== Terminal 1 ===
Terminal 1 opened in 1955 as Mehrabad Airports main terminal, it was the first advanced airport in the Middle East. The building has been registered as a national historical monument in Iran due to its architecture and its importance in the countries development. It is responsible for flights operated by the following airlines: Air1Air, Chabahar Airlines, Kish Air, Varesh Airlines, and Zagros Airlines.

=== Terminal 2 ===
Terminal 2 opened in 1977 in order to help with the expansion of the airport, located near terminal 1, it is the busiest terminal in the airport. It is responsible for flights operated by Asajet, ATA Airlines, Ava Air, Iran Air, Iran Airtour, Karun Airlines, Meraj Airlines, and Qeshm Air.

=== Terminal 4 ===
Terminal 4 opened in 2007 as part of another expansion within the airport complex. Located further from terminal 1 and 2, it helps with reducing traffic while increasing capacity. It handles flights operated by Caspian Airlines, FlyPersia, Iran Aseman Airlines, Mahan Air, Pars Air, Pouya Air, Saha Airlines, Sepehran Airlines, Taban Air, and Yazd Airways.

=== Terminal 6 ===
Terminal 6 opened in 2012 in order to assist as the arrival hall of terminal 4. It handles the arrival of all airlines that depart from terminal 4.

=== Former terminals ===
Formerly, Mehrabad had a Terminal 3 that was used for Hajj flights, which were transferred to Imam Khomeini. It also had a Terminal 5 that was used for cargo flights, which were also transferred to Imam Khomeini.

=== Ground transportation ===
Mehrabad Airport is located near Azadi Tower and the Western Tehran Passenger Bus Terminal. It is accessible through Makhsus Karaj Expressway.

Mehrabad is also accessible through the Tehran Metro, it has two stations on the complex, Mehrabad Airport Terminal 1 and 2 station, and Mehrabad Airport Terminal 4 and 6 station

=== Offices ===
The airport is home to the head offices of Iran Air and the Iran Civil Aviation Organization. The Iranian Airports Company also has its head office at Mehrabad Airport, near Terminal 2.

== Airlines and destinations ==
Since 2007, after international routes were moved to a new airport located in Vahnabad. The airport only serves domestic flights to 41 Iranian cities.

Airlines	Destinations
ATA Airlines	Kermanshah
Chabahar Airlines	Khorramabad, Urmia
Fly Kish	Yazd
Iran Air	Hamadan
Iran Airtour	Birjand
Iran Aseman Airlines	Bojnord
Mahan Air	Bojnord, Jask, Saravan
Nasim Air	Mashhad
Pars Air	Birjand, Yasuj
Raimon Airways	Rasht
Yazd Airways	Sabzevar, Yazd

== Accidents and incidents ==
- On 15 March 1974, a Sterling Airways Sud Aviation Caravelle suffered a landing gear failure. As the aircraft was taxiing, the right main landing gear failed, causing the right wing to collapse and catch fire. Fifteen passengers were killed in the accident.
- On 5 December 1974, a roof collapsed, killing 17 and injuring dozens more.
- On 21 January 1980, Iran Air Flight 291 crashed into the Alborz mountains on approach to Mehrabad, killing all 128 people on board.
- On 8 February 1993, a mid-air collision occurred between Iran Air Tours Tupolev Tu-154M and IRIAF Sukhoi Su-24, killing all 133 people on board both aircraft involved.
- On 2 February 2000, During takeoff, a Lockheed C-130 Hercules with eight occupants onboard veered off the runway and had struck an empty Iran Air Airbus A300B2-203 that was being towed to a hangar. Eight people died.
- On 20 April 2005, Saha Airlines Flight 171, a Boeing 707-3J9C, had an accident while landing in Mehrabad airport. After touchdown on runway 29L, problems with the undercarriage (failure of landing gear or a burst tire) caused the Boeing 707 to slide off the runway into the Kan River. Three passengers were killed after they fell in the river during the evacuation.
- 19 June 2005: at 0435 in the morning Tehran local time, Northwest Airlines Flight 41, a McDonnell Douglas DC-10, operating from Mumbai to Amsterdam made an emergency landing at the airport. It was the first American commercial flight to land in Iran in 26 years, since the Iranian Revolution in 1979. Fire had been spotted at the airplane's main cabin.
- On 6 December 2005, an Iranian Air Force Lockheed C-130 Hercules crashed in Tehran shortly after taking off from the airport; 106 people were killed.
- On 2 January 2008, an Iran Air Fokker 100 (EP-IDB) plane carrying 100 passengers skidded off the runway after part of its wing caught fire when attempting to take off on a domestic flight to Shiraz Airport. The landing gear disintegrated and the ensuing fire partially consumed the wings. No one was injured in the accident, which happened around 07:30 IRST amid heavy snowfall at the airport.
- On 10 August 2014, Sepahan Airlines Flight 5915, an HESA IrAn-140, crashed shortly after takeoff from Mehrabad International Airport. The aircraft experienced engine malfunction and attempted a return to the airport four minutes after takeoff, but was unable to maintain altitude and crashed into a residential area. 39 people were killed and nine were injured.
- On 15 October 2015, a Mahan Air Boeing 747 en route to Bandar Abbas in southern Iran lost pieces of an engine after take-off, returning for a successful emergency landing. None of the 300 people on board were injured.
- On 19 March 2019, a Fokker 100 (registration: EP-IDG) had an emergency landing with its main landing gear not extended. Nobody was injured in the accident.

== See also ==
- Iran Civil Aviation Organization
- Meraj Airlines
- Transport in Iran
- List of airlines of Iran
- List of airports in Iran
- List of the busiest airports in Iran
- List of the busiest airports in the Middle East
