= 12th Tactical Reconnaissance Squadron (ROCAF) =

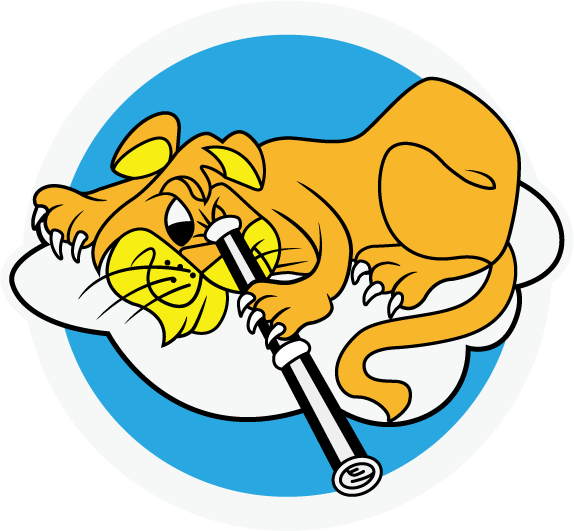
- 12th TRS emblem
- Active: 1932 – present
- Country: Taiwan (Republic of China)
- Allegiance: Republic of China Air Force
- Role: Reconnaissance
- Part of: 401st Tactical Composite Wing
- Garrison/HQ: Hualien Air Force Base
- Equipment: General Dynamics F-16A/B Fighting Falcon; Northrop RF-5E Tigergazer; Northrop F-5F Tiger II

The 12th Tactical Reconnaissance Squadron (12th TRS) is an active unit of the Republic of China Air Force. It is part of the 401st Tactical Composite Wing and operates the General Dynamics F-16A/B Fighting Falcon, Northrop RF-5E Tigergazer and Northrop F-5F Tiger II from Hualien Air Force Base, Hualien County.

== History ==
=== 1997 to present ===
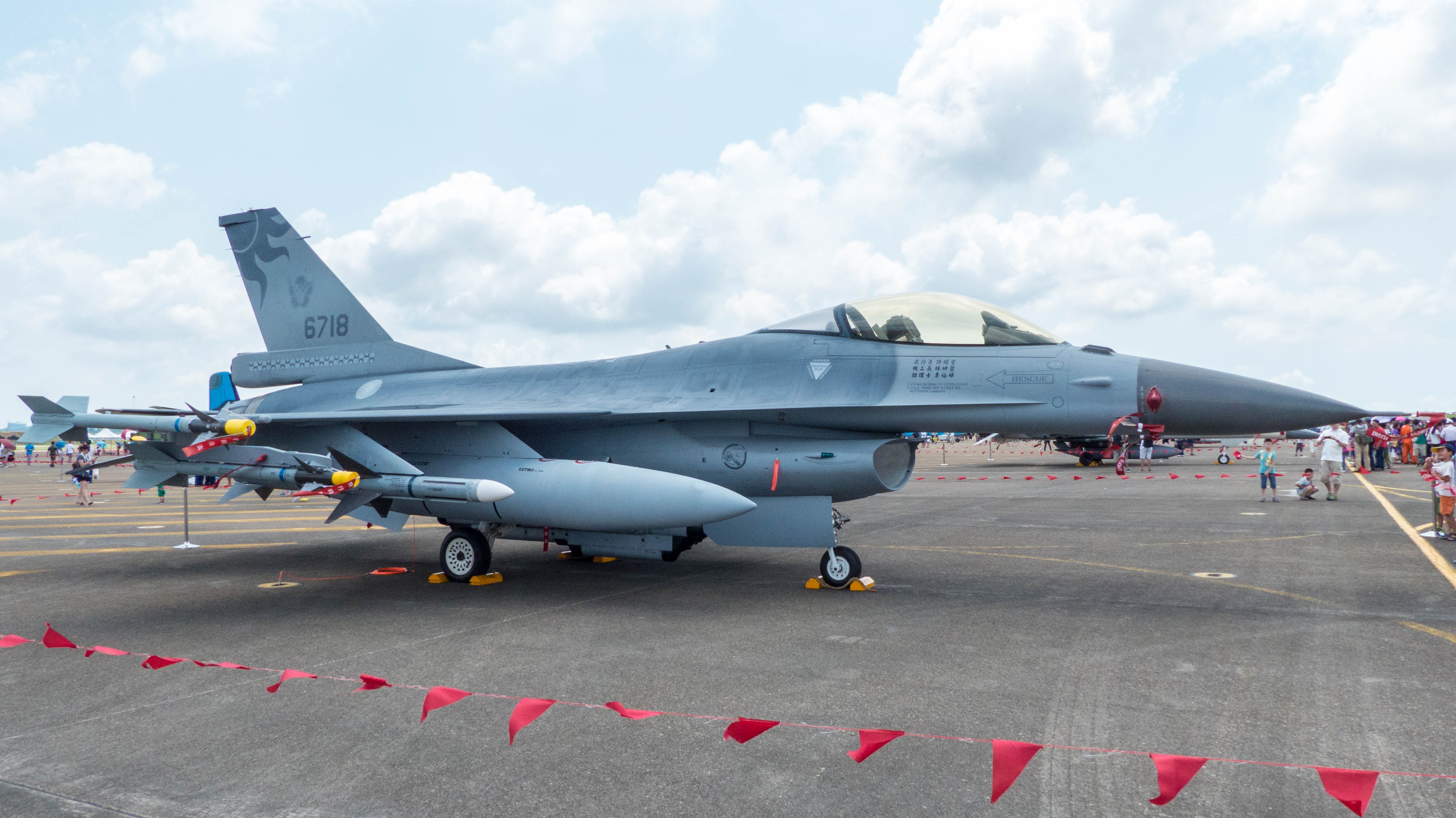
General Dynamics RF-16A Fighting Falcon 6718 of the 12th TRS at Ching Chuan Kang Air Base, 2014.

Up until 1998, the 12th TRS were operating the Lockheed TF/RF-104G Stargazer and Northrop F-5E/F Tiger II from Taoyuan Air Base, Taoyuan. With the forthcoming retirement of the Starfighter, the 12th TRS began to convert to the Northrop RF-5E Tigergazer, with deliveries first arriving in August 1997. On 22 May 1998, the last two TF-104Gs (4186 and 4196) were retired in a ceremony at Ching Chuan Kang Air Base, Taichung.

On 1 July 1998, the 12th TRS relocated to Hualien Air Force Base, Hualien County, and converted to the General Dynamics F-16A/B Fighting Falcon, which replaced the F-5Es. The squadron's RF-5Es were also transferred to the 4th Tactical Reconnaissance Squadron during this time. The 12th TRS' F-16As are equipped with Phoenix Eye reconnaissance pods, leading to an unofficial designation of RF-16A.

In May 2011, the 12th TRS began to receive the RF-5E back from the 4th TRS, starting with 5503 and 5506. On 13 September 2011, 5506 and F-5F 5401 of the 4th TRS both crashed into a mountain during a night-time sortie, killing all crew. The squadron completed its conversion to the RF-5E on 12 June 2013, operating them alongside the F-16.

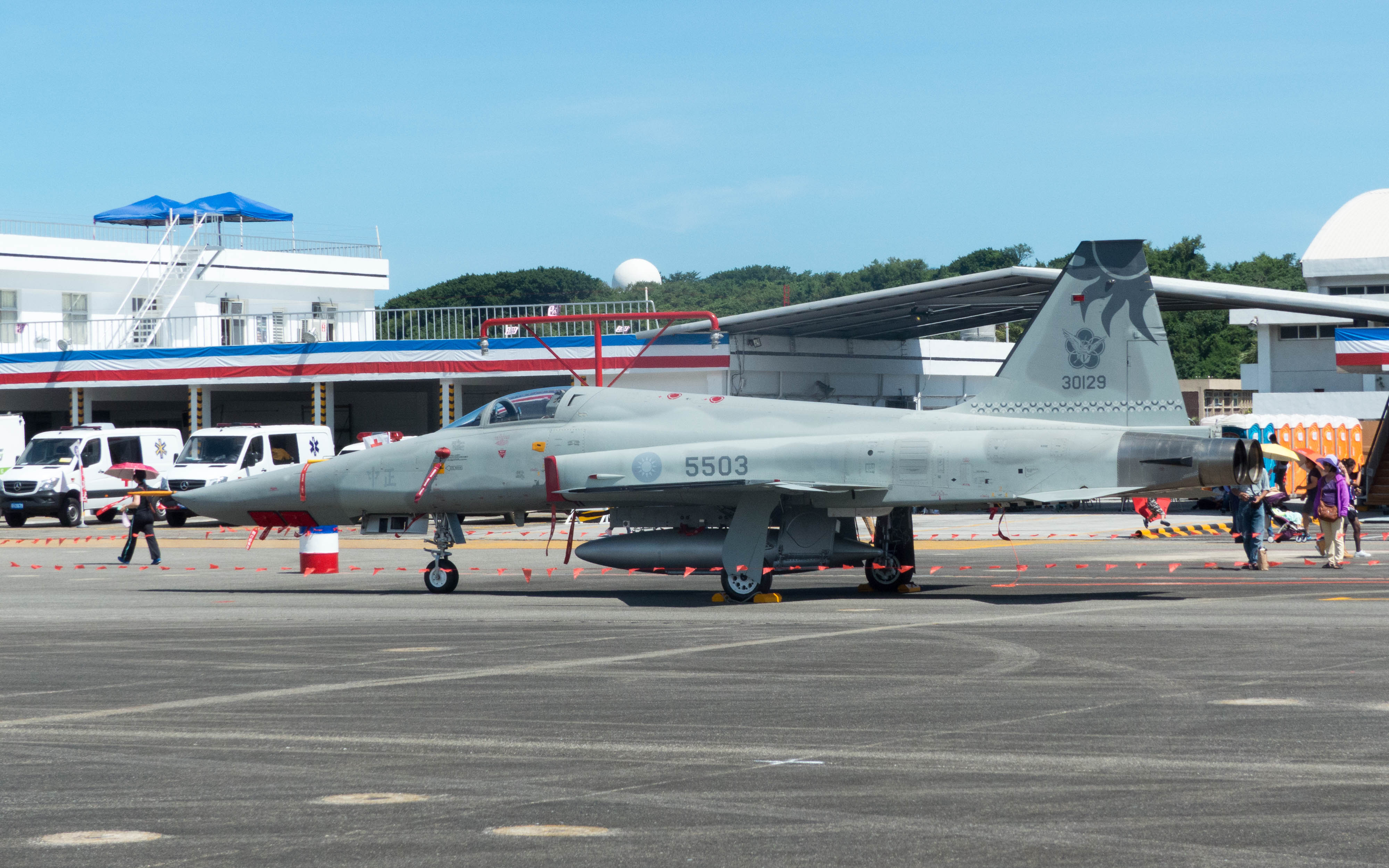
Northrop RF-5E Tigergazer 5503 of the 12th TRS at Hualien Air Force Base, 2017.

In October 2019, it was announced by the Minister of National Defence Yen Teh-fa that Taiwan is looking to replace the Phoenix Eye recon pod with the UTC Aerospace Systems MS-110 pod which would be carried by the RF-16 fleet, allowing for the retirement of the RF-5Es.

== Aircraft operated ==
- RF-101A Voodoo (1973-1973)
- Lockheed RF-104G Stargazer (–1997)
- Lockheed TF-104G Starfighter (–1998)
- Northrop F-5E Tiger II (–1998)
- Northrop F-5F Tiger II (–1998; 2011–present)
- Northrop RF-5E Tigergazer (1997–1998; 2011–present)
- General Dynamics RF-16A Fighting Falcon (1998–present)
- General Dynamics F-16B Fighting Falcon (1998–present)

== See also ==
- Black Bat Squadron
- Black Cat Squadron
