= Black Cat Squadron =

35th Squadron
- Black Cat Squadron official emblem
- Active: 1961–74
- Branch: Republic of China Air Force
- Role: Surveillance
- Garrison/HQ: Taoyuan Air Base
- Nickname: Black Cat Squadron

Commanders
- Notable commanders: Lu Xiliang

Aircraft flown
- Reconnaissance: Lockheed U-2

The Black Cat Squadron (Chinese: 黑貓中隊; pinyin: Hēimāo Zhōngduì), formally the 35th Squadron, was a squadron of the Republic of China Air Force that flew the U-2 surveillance plane out of Taoyuan Air Base in northern Taiwan, from 1961 to 1974. 26 ROCAF pilots successfully completed U-2 training in the US and flew 220 operational missions, with about half over the People's Republic of China.

When the squadron was formed in 1961, Colonel Lu Xiliang (盧錫良) became its first commander and would become its longest-serving squadron commander. Lu was born in Shanghai on December 27, 1923, and completed his training in the US.

During the squadron's 14 years of existence, five U-2s were shot down by PRC air defenses (using S-75 Dvina missiles), with three pilots killed and two captured. Another pilot was killed while performing an operational mission off the Chinese coast, while seven U-2s were lost during training missions, killing six pilots.

A total of 19 U-2s were assigned to the Black Cat Squadron, over fourteen years, although the squadron usually had only two U-2s assigned to it at any one time; sometimes there was just one aircraft.

The intelligence gathered by the Black Cat Squadron, which included evidence of a military build-up on the Sino-Soviet border, may have contributed to the U.S. opening to China during the Nixon administration by revealing the escalating tensions between the two communist nations. Shortly after Nixon's visit to Beijing, all reconnaissance flights over the People's Republic ceased, and the Black Cat Squadron was officially disbanded in the spring of 1974.

== Operational missions ==
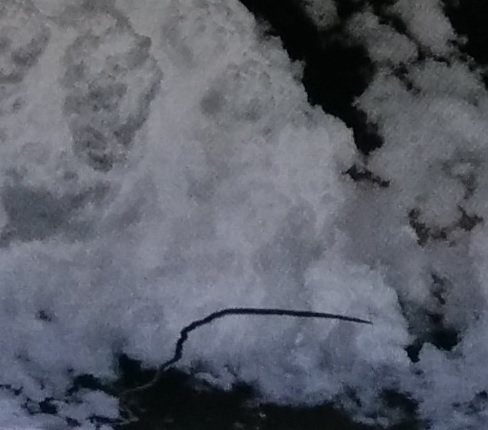
During a reconnaissance mission in Yunnan province, Chuang Ren-Liang saw two incoming missiles in his correction camera and evaded S-75 Dvina missiles that day.

The only other U-2 operator than CIA, USAF and United Kingdom was the Republic of China (Taiwan), which flew missions mostly over the People's Republic of China (PRC). Since the 1950s, the Republic of China Air Force had used the RB-57A/D aircraft for reconnaissance missions over the PRC, but suffered two losses when MiG-17s and S-75 Dvina Surface-to-Air Missiles were able to intercept the aircraft.

In 1958, ROC and American authorities reached an agreement to create the 35th Squadron, nicknamed the Black Cat Squadron, composed of two U-2Cs at Taoyuan Air Base in northern Taiwan, at an isolated part of the airbase. To create the typical misdirections at the time, the unit was created under the cover of high altitude weather research missions for ROCAF. To the US government, the 35th Squadron and any US CIA/USAF personnel assigned to the unit were known as Detachment H on all documents. But instead of being under normal USAF control, the project was known as Project RAZOR, and was run directly by CIA with USAF assistance.

Each of the 35th Squadron's operational missions had to be approved by both the US and the Taiwan/ROC presidents beforehand. To add another layer of security and secrecy to the project, all US military and CIA/government personnel stationed in Taoyuan assigned to Detachment H were issued official documents and ID with false names and cover titles as Lockheed employees/representatives in civilian clothes. The ROCAF pilots and ground support crew would never know their US counterpart's real name and rank/title, or which US government agencies they were dealing with.

Twenty-six of 28 ROC pilots sent to the US completed training between 1959 and 1973, at Laughlin Air Force Base, Texas. On the night of August 3, 1959, a U-2 on a training mission, out of Laughlin AFB, Texas, piloted by Maj. Mike Hua of ROC Air Force, made a successful unassisted nighttime emergency landing at Cortez, Colorado, that was later known as the "Miracle at Cortez". Major Hua was later awarded the US Air Force Distinguished Flying Cross for saving the top secret aircraft.

In January 1961, the CIA provided the ROC with its first two U-2Cs, and in April the squadron flew its first mission over mainland China. Other countries were also covered from time to time by the 35th Squadron, such as North Korea, North Vietnam and Laos, but the main objective of the ROC 35th Squadron was to conduct reconnaissance missions assessing the PRC's nuclear capabilities. For this purpose the ROC pilots flew as far as Gansu and other remote regions in northwest China. Some of the missions, due to mission requirements and range, plus to add some element of surprise, had the 35th Squadron's U-2s flying from or recovered at other US air bases in Southeast Asia and Eastern Asia, such as Kunsan Air Base in South Korea, or Takhli Royal Thai Air Force Base in Thailand. All US airbases in the region were listed as emergency/ alternate recovery airfields and could be used besides the 35th Squadron's home base at Taoyuan Air Base in Taiwan. Initially, all film taken by the Black Cat Squadron was flown to Okinawa or Guam for processing and development, and the US forces would not share any of the mission photos with Taiwan, but in the late 1960s the USAF agreed to share complete sets of mission photos and help Taiwan set up a photo development and interpretation unit at Taoyuan.

On September 9, 1962, the first loss occurred when the PRC downed a U-2 near Nanchang; the pilot Chen Huai died in a PRC hospital. The U.S. denied PRC accusations of involvement in the ROC flights, noting that the previous Eisenhower administration had sold the U-2s to ROC. This was a cover story, however as the CIA maintained Detachment H's U-2s and replaced them as necessary, and CIA pilots from Detachment G began using Detachment H's unmarked U-2 for flights over North Vietnam in February 1962.

The demand for intelligence on the Chinese nuclear program grew but so did the number of PRC SAM sites and use of the Fan Song radar, and ROC overflights became more dangerous. Two more ROC U-2s were shot down, one on 1 November 1963 over Jiangxi and one on 7 July 1964 over Fujian, and ROC demanded improved electronic countermeasures (ECM) equipment. Detachment H's U-2s had the System XII radar detector but not the sophisticated System XIII radar jammer, because the United States Department of Defense feared its loss to the PRC. The need for intelligence on the Chinese nuclear program was so great that the Defense Department agreed to install improved ECM equipment, but insisted that pilots not turn System XIII on until System XII detected FAN SONG. After another ROC U-2 was lost in circumstances that remain classified as of July 2013, ROC refused to conduct further overflights unless its pilots could use System XIII whenever over the PRC.

After China conducted its third nuclear test on May 9, 1966, the US was eager to obtain information on the Chinese capabilities. To this end, the CIA initiated a program, code named Tabasco, to develop a sensor pod that could be dropped into the Taklamakan Desert, near the Chinese Lop Nur nuclear test site. The pod was intended to deploy an antenna after landing and radio back data to the US SIGINT station at Shulinkou Taiwan. After a year of testing in the US, the pod was ready. Two pilots of the 35th squadron were trained in the dropping of the pod. On May 7, 1967, a ROCAF U-2 (article 383) flown by Spike Chuang took off from Takhli with a sensor pod under each wing. The aircraft successfully released the pods at the target, near the Lop Nur, but no data were received from the pods. This was unfortunate, as China conducted a test of its first thermonuclear device in Test No. 6 on 17 June 1967. A second U-2 mission was flown to the area by a Black Cat squadron U-2 flown by Bill Chang on 31 August 1967. This U-2 carried a recorder and an interrogator in an attempt to contact the pods. This mission was unsuccessful, as nothing was heard from the pods. This set the stage for Operation Heavy Tea, conducted by the Black Bat Squadron.

In 1968, the ROC U-2C/F/G fleet was replaced with the newer U-2R. However, with the overwhelming threats from S-75 Dvina missiles and MiG-21 interceptors, along with the rapprochement between the US and the PRC, the ROC U-2 squadron stopped entering Chinese airspace, and instead only conducted electronic surveillance plus photo reconnaissance missions with new Long-Range Oblique Reconnaissance (LOROP) cameras on the U-2R while flying over international waters. The last U-2 aircraft mission over mainland China took place on 16 March 1968. After that, all missions had the U-2 aircraft fly outside a buffer zone at least 20 nautical miles (37 km) around China.

During his visit to China in 1972, US President Richard Nixon promised the Chinese authorities to cease all reconnaissance missions near and over China, though this was also made practical because US photo satellites by 1972 were able to provide better overhead images without risking losing aircraft and pilots, or provoking international incidents. The last 35th Squadron mission was flown by Sungchou "Mike" Chiu on May 24, 1974.

By the end of ROC's U-2 operations, a total of 19 U-2C/F/G/R aircraft had been operated by the 35th Squadron from 1959 to 1974. The squadron flew a total of about 220 missions, with about half over mainland China, resulting in five aircraft shot down, with three fatalities and two pilots captured; one aircraft lost while performing an operational mission off the Chinese coast, with the pilot killed; and another seven aircraft lost in training with six pilots killed. On July 29, 1974, the two remaining U-2R aircraft in ROC possession were flown from Taoyuan Air Base to Edwards AFB, California, US, and turned over to the USAF.

== Members after retirement ==
After his retirement, Col. Lu Xiliang (盧錫良) and his family immigrated to Los Angeles in 1986, where he became an ardent activist for ROCAF POWs' rights, particularly the right of POWs to return to Taiwan to reunite with their families after imprisonment in mainland China. Lu died on December 15, 2008.

In addition to Lu Xiliang, another six former-members of the squadron eventually settled in the US, including Zhuang Renliang (莊人亮), Wang Taiyou (王太佑) in Los Angeles, Yeh Changti in Texas, Hua Xijun (華錫鈞) in Maryland, and the deputy squadron commander Yang Shiju (楊世駒) in Las Vegas.

In 1986, Wang Hsi-chueh (王錫爵) defected to mainland China in a Boeing 747-2R7F/SCD freighter.

== List of ROC U-2 aircraft lost ==
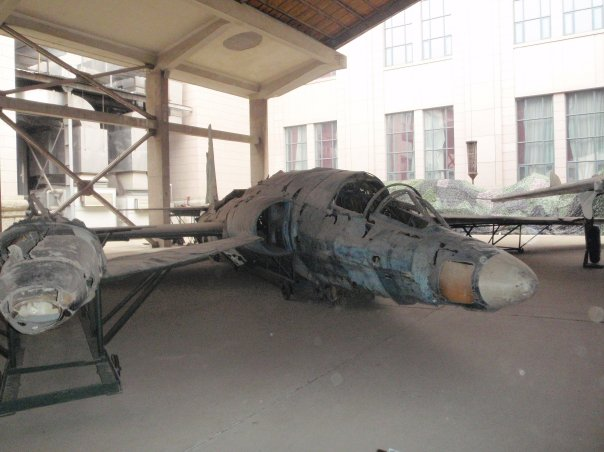
U-2C 56-6691 wreckage (shot down on 10 January 1965) on display at the Military Museum of the Chinese People's Revolution, Beijing

Shot down over mainland China

- September 9, 1962: U-2C N.378 - Major Chen Huai (killed)
- November 1, 1963: U-2C N.355 - Major Yeh Changti (captured, released in 1982), shot down by Yue Zhenghua and his Second Battalion
- July 7, 1964: U-2G N.362 - Lt. Colonel Lee Nanpin (killed), shot down over Fujian by Yue Zhenghua and his Second Battalion
- January 10, 1965: U-2C N.358 - Major Chang Liyi (captured, released in 1982), shot down over Baotou by Wang Lin and his First Battalion
- September 8, 1967: U-2C N.373 - Captain Huang Jungpei (killed), shot down over Jiaxing by Xia Cunfeng and the 14th Battalion, first success by a Chinese-made surface-to-air missile

Lost due to technical failure during operational missions

- May 16, 1969: model and number unknown - Major Chang Hsieh (killed)

Lost during training missions

- March 19, 1961: U-2C N.351 - Major Chih Yaohua (killed)
- March 23, 1964: U-2F N.356 - Captain Liang Tehpei (killed)
- October 22, 1965: U-2A N.352 - Major Wang Chengwen (killed)
- February 17, 1966: U-2F N.372 - Captain Wu Tsaishi (killed)
- March 22, 1966: model and number unknown - Captain Fan Hungdi (survived)
- June 21, 1966: U-2C N.384 - Major Yu Chingchang (killed)
- November 24, 1970: U-2R N.057 - Major Huang Chihsien (killed)

== See also ==
- 12th Tactical Reconnaissance Squadron (ROCAF)
