= Jack Chang =

Jack Chang may refer to:

- Chang Liyi (1929–2019), Republic of China Air Force pilot
- Chang Chen-kuang (born 1956), Taiwanese actor
