= Republic of China Air Force Thunder Tiger Aerobatics Team =

- Thunder Tiger Aerobatics Team patch
- Active: 1953 – present
- Country: Taiwan (Republic of China)
- Branch: Republic of China Air Force
- Role: Aerobatic flight demonstration team
- Garrison/HQ: Kangshan Air Base

Aircraft flown
- Fighter: AIDC AT-3B (two seat)

The Republic of China Air Force Thunder Tigers Aerobatics Team (Chinese: 中華民國空軍雷虎特技小組) was founded in 1953 and is under the jurisdiction of the Republic of China Air Force.

== History ==
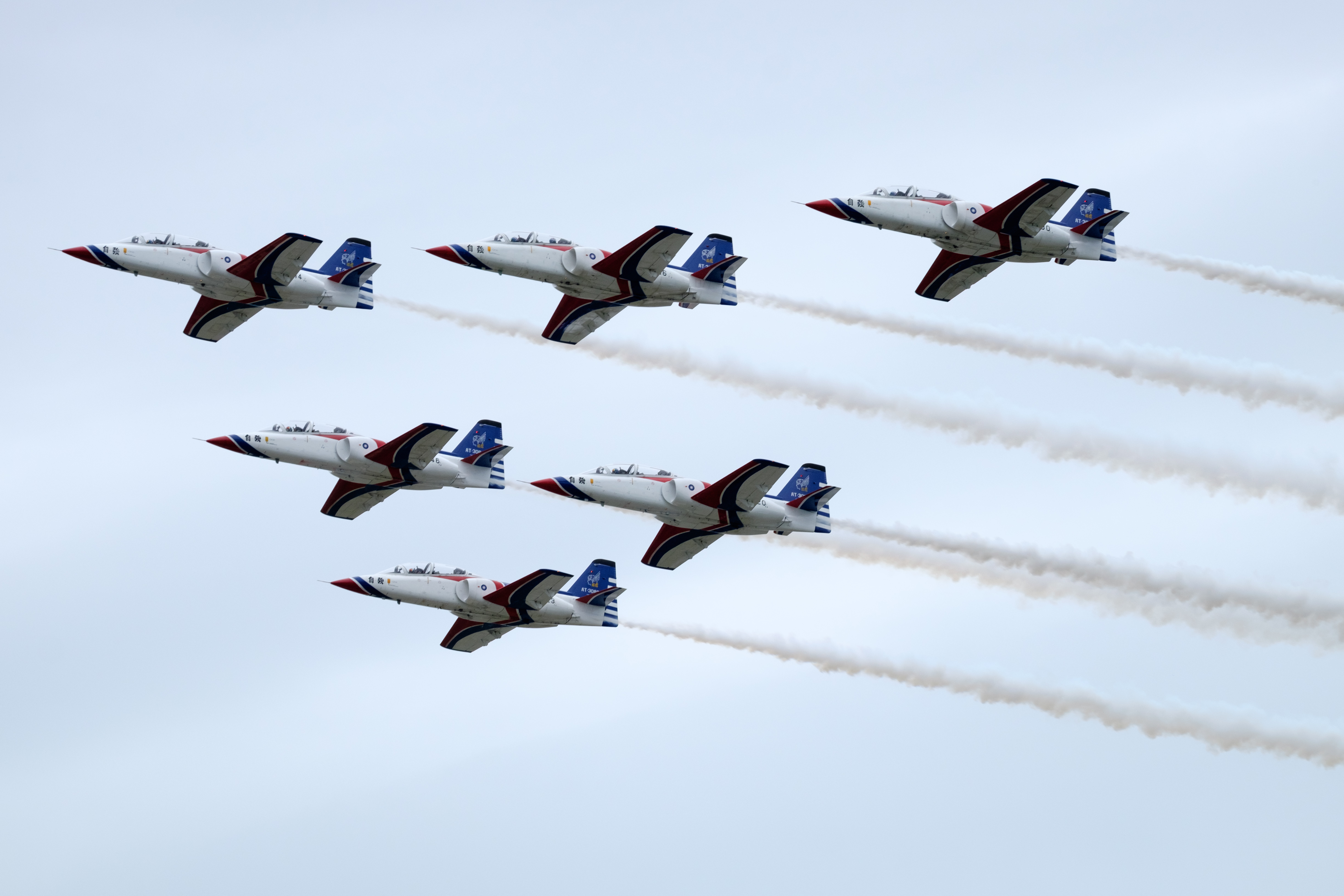
Six AT-3B Thunder Tigers in arrow formation flight over Hualien Air Base, 2016

The Republic of China Air Force Thunder Tiger Aerobatics Team was established at Tainan Air Force Base in 1953. At the time of its founding, most Thunder Tiger pilots lived in Tainan's Shueijiaoshe military compound. Since 1993, the group has been based at the Republic of China Air Force Academy in Gangshan, Kaohsiung. In the past, the team has flown a wide array of aircraft, including the F-84G Thunderjet, and F-86F Sabre, as well as light fighters in the Northrop F-5 family. They now fly the AT-3 developed by the Taiwan-based Aerospace Industrial Development Corporation in air shows. To honor the Republic of China centenary in 2011, the Thunder Tigers participated in the largest flypast held in Taiwan. In October 2014, Lieutenant Colonel Chuang Pei-yuan was involved in a fatal crash while flying an AT-3 owned by the Thunder Tigers on a routine training mission. Team activities were suspended shortly after all AT-3 aircraft were grounded for inspection. The Thunder Tigers flew at Chuang's funeral in November 2014, but did not perform at unofficial public events until November 2016.

== See also ==
- United States Air Force Thunderbirds
- Blue Angels – United States Navy
- Russian Knights – Russian Air Force
- Red Arrows – Royal Air Force
