= Yeh Changti =

Pilot in the Republic of China Air Force (1933–2016)

- Born: 29 November 1933; Huiyang, Guangdong, Republic of China
- Died: 16 November 2016 (aged 82); Taipei, Taiwan
- Other names: Ye Changdi, Robin Yeh
- Military career
- Allegiance: Republic of China
- Branch: Republic of China Air Force
- Rank: Major
- Unit: Black Cat Squadron

Chinese name
- Traditional Chinese: 葉常棣
- Simplified Chinese: 叶常棣
Transcriptions
Standard Mandarin
- Hanyu Pinyin: Yè Chángdì
- Wade–Giles: Yeh⁴ Ch'ang²-ti⁴

Yeh Changti or Ye Changdi (Chinese: 葉常棣; 29 November 1933 – 16 November 2016), also known as Robin Yeh, was a pilot in the Republic of China Air Force with the rank of major. A member of the CIA-trained Black Cat Squadron, he flew the American U-2 reconnaissance aircraft to spy on China's nuclear program. He was shot down on 1 November 1963 over Shangrao, Jiangxi and held in mainland China for 19 years. Yeh was released from China in 1982, but not granted permission to return to Taiwan until 1990, living the interim years in the United States.

== Early life and career ==
Yeh was born in November 1933 in Huiyang, Guangdong, and grew up in British Hong Kong. He graduated from the Republic of China Air Force Academy of Taiwan in 1954. In 1960, he flew a McDonnell F-101 Voodoo on his first reconnaissance mission over the People's Republic of China (PRC). He flew another nine missions the following year, and was personally received by President Chiang Kai-shek of the Republic of China (ROC) twice and awarded two medals.

== U-2 pilot and capture ==
In the late 1950s, the United States and the ROC initiated a top-secret reconnaissance program to spy on the PRC's nuclear bomb project. To reach the project sites located deep inland in Northwest China, ROC pilots were trained by the Central Intelligence Agency in the US to fly the Lockheed U-2 high-altitude reconnaissance aircraft. Yeh was selected to receive U-2 training and joined the Black Cat Squadron in 1963. From 3 August, he flew two missions over the PRC and received the Flying Tiger Medal.

On 1 November 1963, Yeh flew a U-2C aircraft (No. 355) on his third mission to spy on the PRC's missile production facilities at the Jiuquan Missile Base in Gansu, Northwest China. When he flew over Shangrao, Jiangxi, on the return leg, his plane was shot down by an SA-2 surface-to-air missile launched by the 2nd Battalion of the People's Liberation Army Air Force (PLAAF). Lt. Colonel Yue Zhenghua, the commander of the battalion, had made the first ever U-2 kill (No. 378, piloted by Major Chen Huai) in September 1962. Yeh ejected from the plane, whose right wing was torn off. Although hit by 59 missile fragments, he retained enough consciousness to open his parachute before passing out.

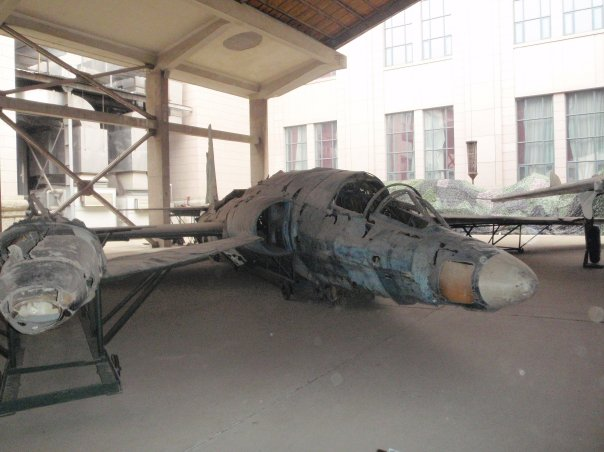
Wreckage of a U-2C on display at the Military Museum of the Chinese People's Revolution, Beijing

After receiving treatment at a PLAAF hospital, Yeh was held at an air force guesthouse in Beijing. Meanwhile, he was declared a "martyr" in Taiwan. In 1965, the ROC Air Force built graves at the Bitan Air Force Martyrs' Cemetery (碧潭公墓) for Yeh Changti and Chang Liyi, another captured Black Cat pilot who was presumed dead. In April 1965, four U-2 aircraft shot down by China were put on display at the Military Museum of the Chinese People's Revolution in Beijing.

Yeh was incarcerated for four years and underwent numerous interrogations. Although some claim he was tortured, Yeh later said he was treated humanely. After the outbreak of the Cultural Revolution, he was released and sent to work on a farm, before being transferred to work at Hanyang Arsenal in Wuhan. Because of his proficiency in English and knowledge in aircraft, he later became an associate professor at Huazhong Institute of Technology and translated papers from Chinese to English for the journal Applied Mathematics and Dynamics (应用数学和力学), edited by Qian Weichang.

== Release and later life ==
In 1982, the PRC government granted Yeh and Chang permission to return to Taiwan and sent them to Hong Kong. However, Chiang Ching-kuo, then President of the Republic of China, considered them compromised and refused to take them back. Yang Shih-Chu (楊世駒), a former commander of the Black Cat Squadron, contacted the CIA, which settled the duo in the United States. Neither pilot received a medal from the CIA, but their shoot-down had a major impact on the agency and the US Air Force, which began to prioritize the development of drones at Area 51. Yeh and Chang were finally granted permission to return to Taiwan in 1990, after the death of Chiang Ching-kuo.

Yeh's wife remarried after he was declared dead in Taiwan. After he was released from China, he only met with his former wife once. He remarried in the 1980s.

On 16 November 2016, Yeh died from a heart attack. ROC President Tsai Ing-wen and Minister of Defence Feng Shih-kuan both attended his funeral and officially recognized his contribution to the country.
