= Black Bat Squadron Memorial Hall =

Memorial hall in East, Hsinchu City, Taiwan

- 黑蝙蝠中隊文物陳列館
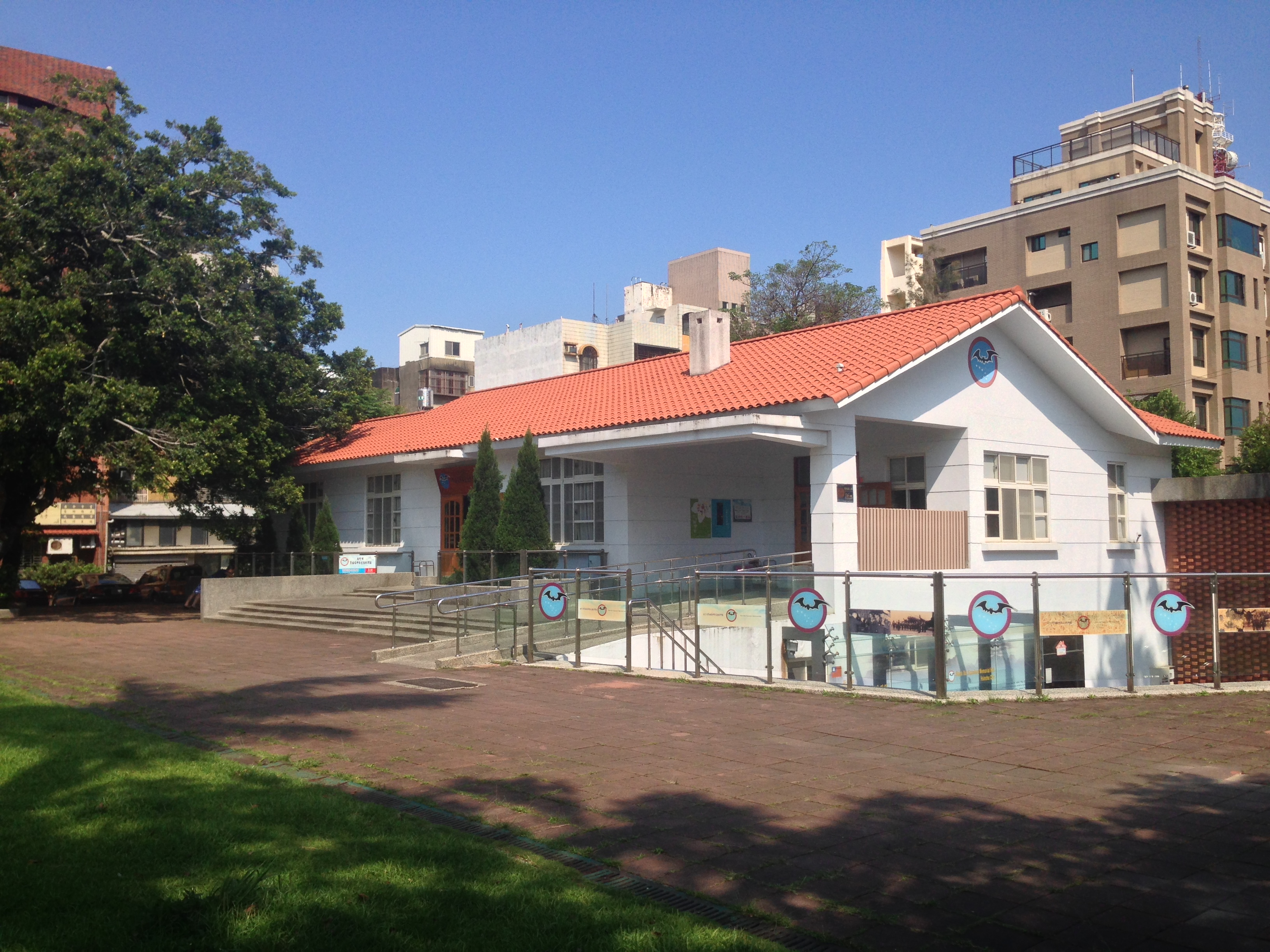
- For Black Bat Squadron
- Established: 22 November 2009
- Location: 24°48′42.8″N 120°58′10.4″E; East, Hsinchu City, Taiwan

The Black Bat Squadron Memorial Hall (traditional Chinese: 黑蝙蝠中隊文物陳列館; simplified Chinese: 黑蝙蝠中队文物陈列馆; pinyin: Hēibiānfú zhōngduì wénwù chénlièguǎn) is a memorial hall dedicated to Black Bat Squadron located in East District, Hsinchu City, Taiwan.

== History ==
On 2 April 2009, the Black Bat Squadron Memorial Hall held a groundbreaking ceremony, located on the original site of the Black Bat Squadron dormitory in the Park 12, Dongda Road by Hsinchu City government, Its mission is to show appreciation and preserve the squadron history and all the airman who have given their lives to defend the nation. The memorial hall cost NT$15 million and the total construction period is 110 days and the hall was opened on 22 November 2009.

== Architecture ==
The memorial hall building is the original building of Black Bat Squadron dormitory. It is designed as the dormitory style for Military Assistance Advisory Group (MAAG) of the United States with a total floor area of 460 m^{2}, comprising between the ground floor and the basement. For additional flexibility, a small open-air square is located left wing of the building for hosting small events. Inside of the square also features a memorial wall of tempered glass that introduces the heroism of the Black Bat Squadron, apart from hosting a complete record of the Black Bat Squadron history, the memorial hall can also support local community events. The memorial hall will therefore introduce people to an important part of history, but also help revitalize local cultural development.

== Exhibitions ==
The memorial hall exhibition space is divided into five thematic areas

- The Story of the Big Era The area provides the general public with an introduction includes a chronology of the Black Bat Squadron, the historical background and a brief outline of the squadron's history.
- Black Bat at the Dark Night This area displays miniature aircraft model inside the cabinets, features 13 types of aircraft that were then flown by the squadron.
- Super Missions This area features major operations and the course of the missions carried out by the squadron.
- The Warriors under The Big Dipper This Area is dedicated to the members of the Black Bat Squadron. It introduces the squadrons previous commanders as well as the 148 casualties who were lost on 15 flights.
- Photos of Squadron Members This area provides photos of the squadron members' daily lives when off duty and related memorabilia provided by former squadron members.

== Transportation ==
The memorial hall is accessible within walking distance north of Hsinchu Station of Taiwan Railway.

== See also ==
- List of tourist attractions in Taiwan
- Chinese Civil War
- Republic of China Air Force
