= AIDC AT-3 =

Taiwan military training aircraft

AT-3 Tzu Chung
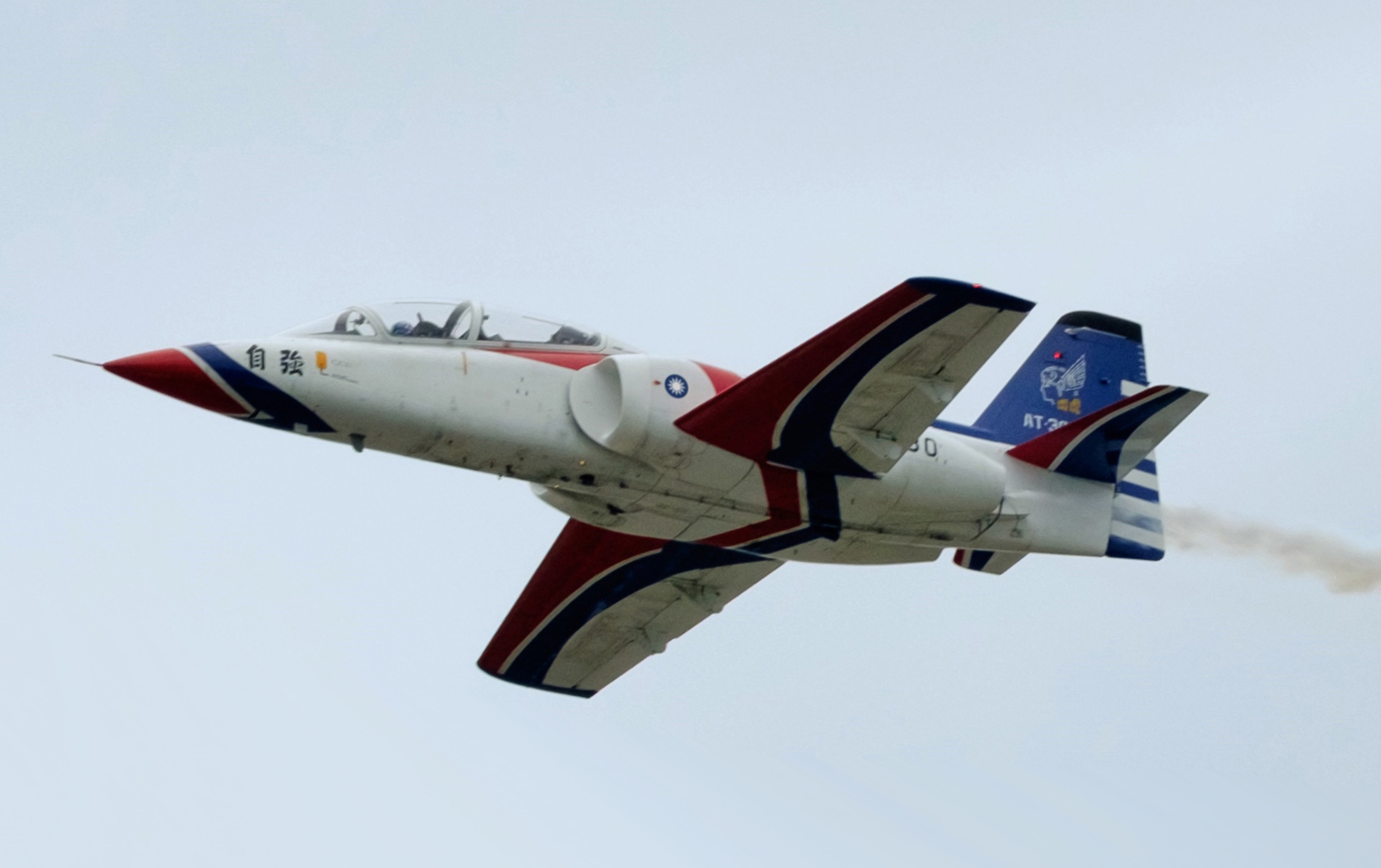
- An AT-3 of the Thunder Tigers Squadron

General information
- Type: Trainer
- National origin: Taiwan
- Manufacturer: Aerospace Industrial Development Corporation
- Status: Retired
- Primary user: Republic of China Air Force
- Number built: 62

History
- Manufactured: 1984–1989
- Introduction date: 1984
- First flight: 16 September 1980
- Retired: 5 August 2025

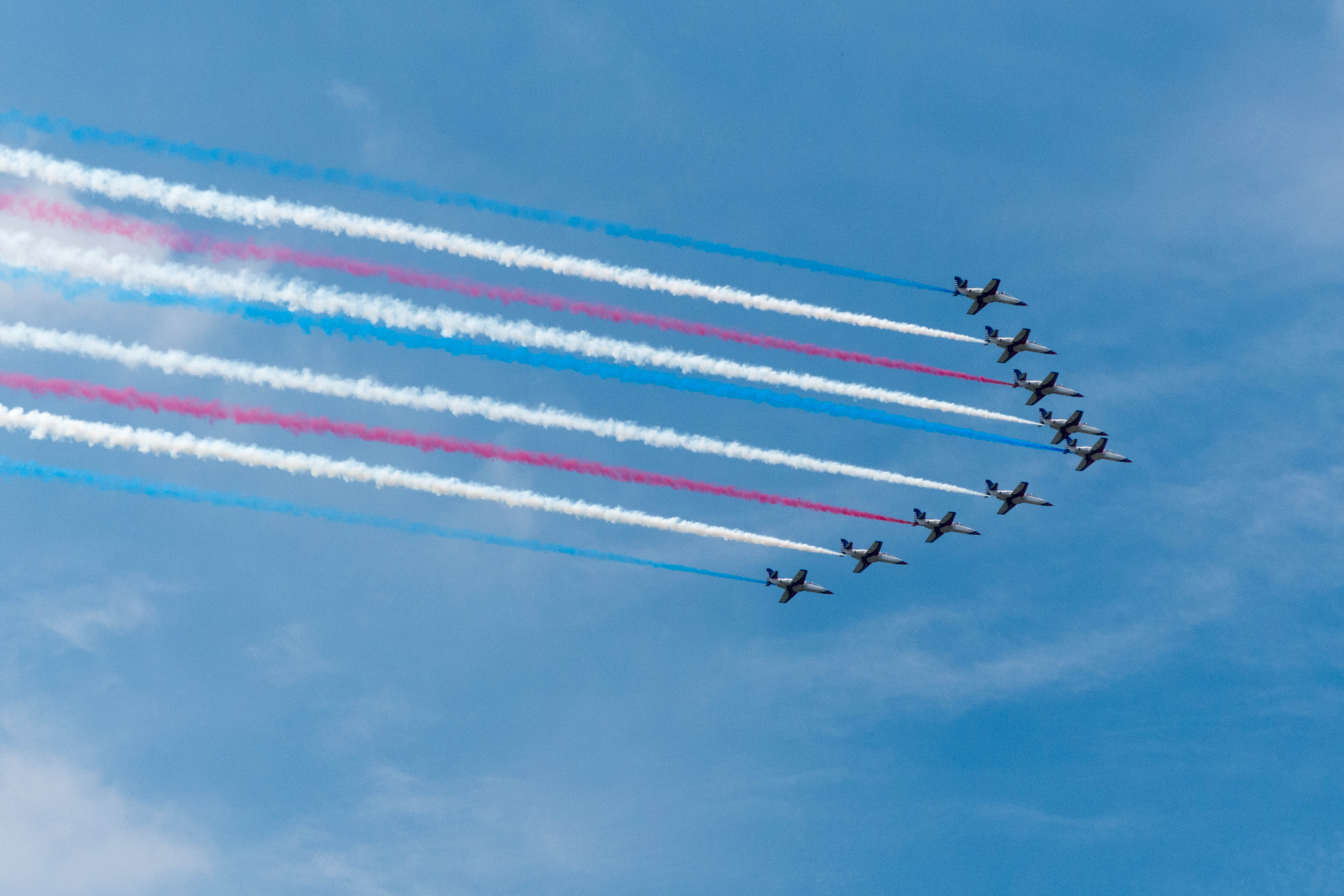
ROCAF Thunder Tigers Flight over ROCMA by V-Shape Formation

The AIDC AT-3 Tzu Chung (Chinese: 自強號高級教練—輕攻擊機; pinyin: Zìqiáng Hào Gāojí Jiàoliàn—Qīng Gōngjījī; Wade–Giles: Tzu^{4}-ch'iang^{2} Hao^{4} Kao^{1}-chi^{2} Chiao^{4}-lien^{4}–Ch'ing^{1} Kung^{1}-chi^{1}-chi^{1}; lit. 'Self Reliance Type Advanced Trainer—Light Attack Aircraft') is an advanced jet trainer and former light attack aircraft operated by the Republic of China Air Force (ROCAF). A total of sixty-two aircraft were manufactured by the Aerospace Industrial Development Corporation of Taiwan in collaboration with American aircraft manufacturer Northrop between 1984 and 1990. Two A-3 single-seat attack version were also built.

== Design and development ==
Design of the advanced jet trainer began in 1975 with a conventional low-wing configuration with a tricycle undercarriage, tandem seat cockpit, and twin turbofans mounted in nacelles on either side of the fuselage. After the design was approved in 1978, two prototypes were produced. The first aircraft rolled out on 17 July 1980 and made its maiden flight on 16 September 1980. Further evaluation resulted in a contract for 60 AT-3As for the ROCAF.

The AT-3 is a low-wing monoplane with a straight wing and a conventional slab tailplane. The AT-3 has five weapon mounts (one centerline, two inboard underwing, two outboard underwing) and wingtip launch rails. There are two Zero-zero Martin-Baker 10 ejection seats in the tandem dual-control cockpit of production models. The rear seat (the Instructor position) is elevated 30 cm to allow better over-the-nose visibility. There's a rarely used small bomb bay feature in the aircraft, now mostly holding an auxiliary fuel tank. AT-3 has two Honeywell/Garrett TFE731-2-2L non-afterburning turbofan engines, producing a total thrust of 3178 kg (31.1 kN; 7000 lb). It is able to carry various size iron bombs, rocket pods, AIM-9 Sidewinder missiles and locally produced TC-1 IR Air-to-air missiles.

== Operational history ==
The first AT-3A operator is the Flight Training Command in ROCAF Academy. In 1988 the Thunder Tiger demonstration team replaced its F-5E aircraft with AT-3s. On 9 September 1989 the 35th Combat Squadron (Night Attack) replaced its Lockheed T-33 Shooting Star trainers with AT-3s painted in SE Asia jungle colors. The AT-3s delivered to the 35th Combat Squadron (Night Attack) were equipped with semi-recessed twin 12.7 mm machine guns in the bomb bay. The 35th Squadron later relocated to ROCAF Academy for logistic reasons, and later stood down in 1999 with its aircraft transferred to the Flight Training Command.

The aircraft operates both as an advanced trainer and for weapons training, and all AT-3 in service with ROCAF are now painted in the Thunder Tiger's Blue, White and Red colors.

The AT-3 went through a mid-life update from 2001 to 2006, which will allow the aircraft to operate beyond 2016.

The XA-3 Lui Meng (simplified Chinese: 雷鸣; traditional Chinese: 雷鳴; pinyin: Léimíng) ("Thunder") single-seat attack version never progressed beyond the prototype stage. Two such aircraft were built, numbered 901 and 902. These aircraft are now retired and on display. AT-3B #825 is on loan to AIDC. These three aircraft were able to carry a shortened version of the HF-2 air-launched anti-ship missile, and were combat-ready with this version of missile during the 1995/1996 Third Taiwan Strait Crisis. The armed two-seat AT-3B upgrade did enter service with the ROCAF.

From 2024, the ROCAF wants to replace the AT-3 with the Brave Eagle trainer jet.

On August 16, 2026, reports from Paraguay suggest that the Paraguayan Air Force is considering to acquire AT-3 with the F-5E/F Tiger IIs in order to restore its supersonic combat capability, which is being weighed against the acquisition of six Super Tucanos worth $101.6 million.

== Variants ==
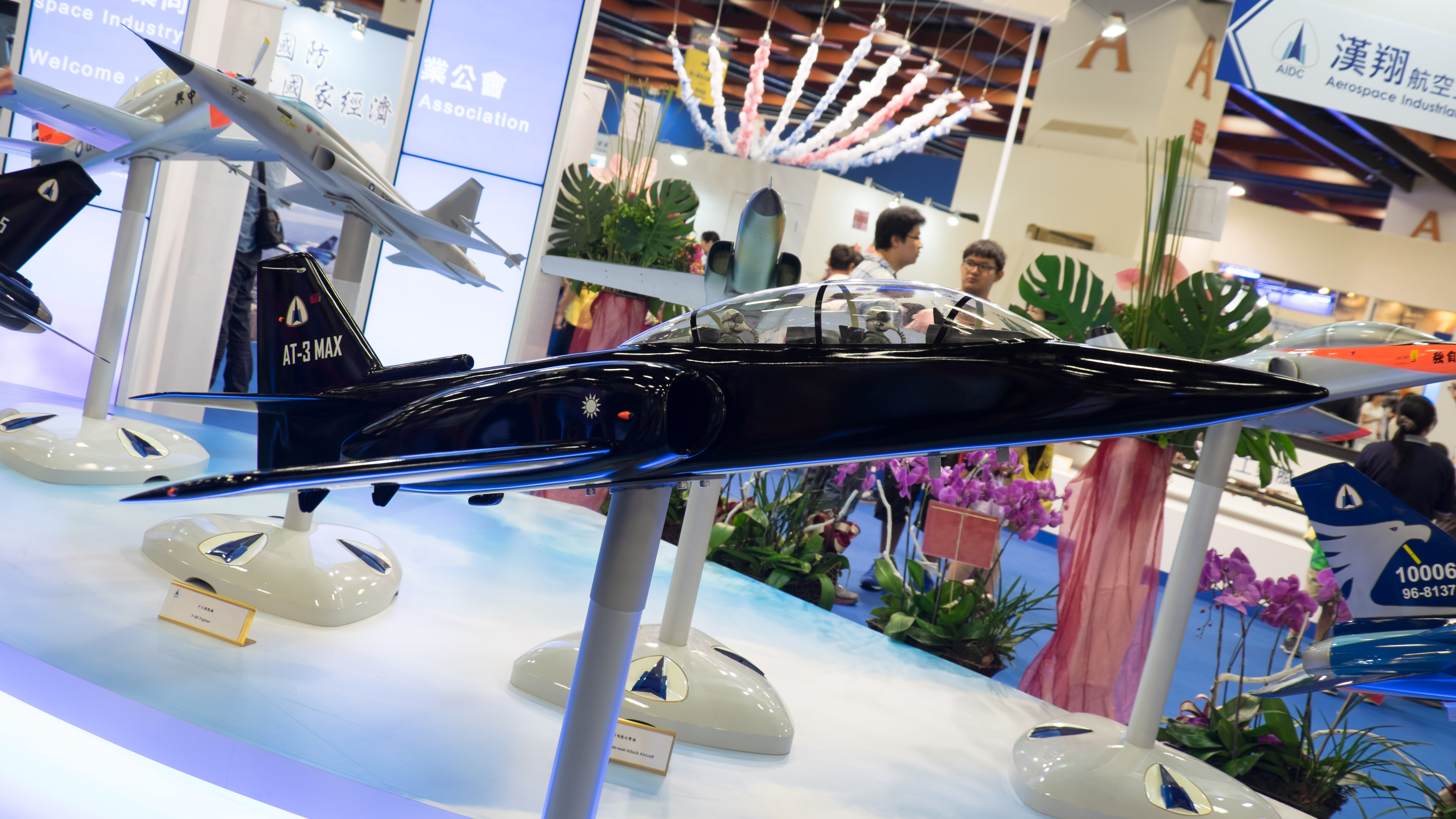
AT-3 Max Advanced Trainer Model Display at AIDC Booth

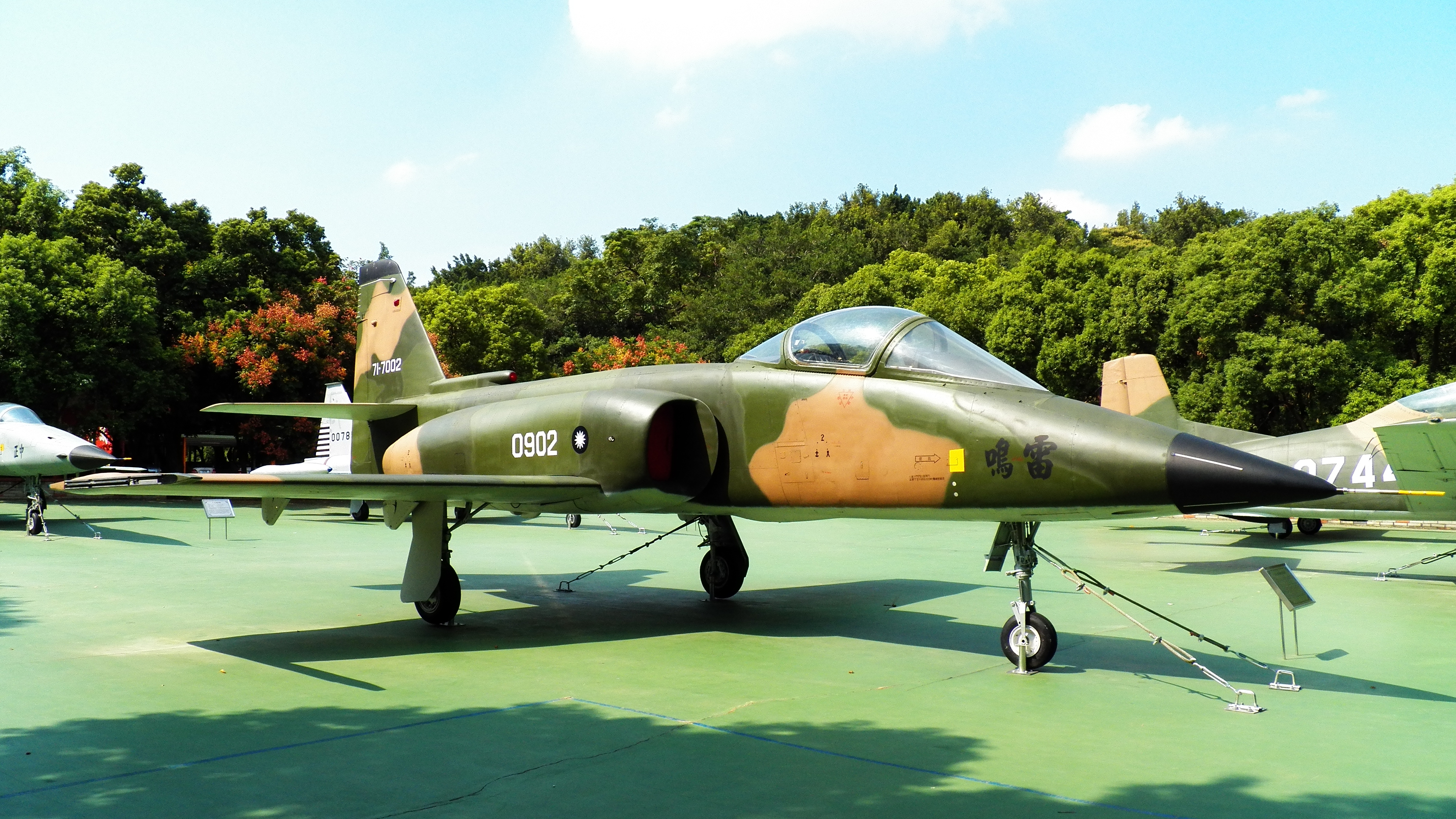
XA-3 in Chengkungling

- XAT-3 : The first two two-seat prototypes.
- AT-3A : Two-seat advanced jet trainer, light attack aircraft for the Republic of China Air Force. 60 production aircraft were built.
- AT-3B : Two-seat ground-attack aircraft for the Republic of China Air Force. 45 of the 60 AT-3A aircraft have been planned for upgrades to the AT-3B standard which includes APG-66T radar and a head-up display (HUD) as its mid-life update project. The status is not currently known.
- XA-3 (Lei Ming): Single-seat ground-attack aircraft. Two prototypes built but program was cancelled due to priorities placed on the AIDC F-CK-1 Ching-kuo. Retired and on display.

== Operators ==
Taiwan

- Republic of China Air Force

== Specifications ==
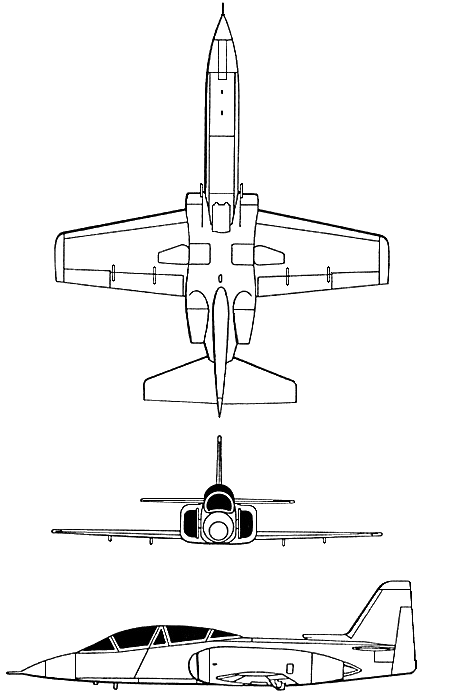
AIDC AT-3

Data from Attack and Interceptor Jets

General characteristics

- Crew: 2
- Length: 12.9 m (42 ft 4 in) (including pitot probe)
- Wingspan: 10.46 m (34 ft 4 in)
- Height: 4.36 m (14 ft 4 in)
- Wing area: 21.93 m^{2} (236.1 sq ft)
- Empty weight: 3,855 kg (8,499 lb)
- Max takeoff weight: 7,940 kg (17,505 lb)
- Powerplant: 2 × Honeywell TFE731-2 turbofan engines, 15.6 kN (3,500 lbf) thrust each

Performance

- Maximum speed: 904 km/h (562 mph, 488 kn) at 11,000 m (36,000 ft)
- Range: 2,280 km (1,420 mi, 1,230 nmi)
- Service ceiling: 14,650 m (48,060 ft)

Armament

- Guns: 2 x .50 (12.7 mm) cal machine guns in ventral pack, 20 mm gun pods
- Hardpoints: Two wing-tip pylons for air-to-air missiles and 5 wing and fuselage hardpoints with a capacity of 2,720 kg (5,997 lb)
- Rockets: 5 in (127 mm) and 2.75 in (70 mm) rocket pods
- Missiles: Sky Sword I and AIM-9P4 Sidewinder air-to-air missiles, HF-2 Mk 2 anti-ship missile.
- Bombs: Mk 82 500 lb (230 kg) bombs, Mk84 2,000 lb (910 kg) bombs, Mk20 cluster bombs

== See also ==
- Republic of China Air Force Thunder Tiger Aerobatics Team

Aircraft of comparable role, configuration, and era

- Aermacchi MB-339
- Aero L-39 Albatros
- BAE Systems Hawk
- CASA C-101
- Dassault/Dornier Alpha Jet
- IAR 99
- Soko G-4 Super Galeb
