= Chang Liyi =

Chinese control systems engineer and professor

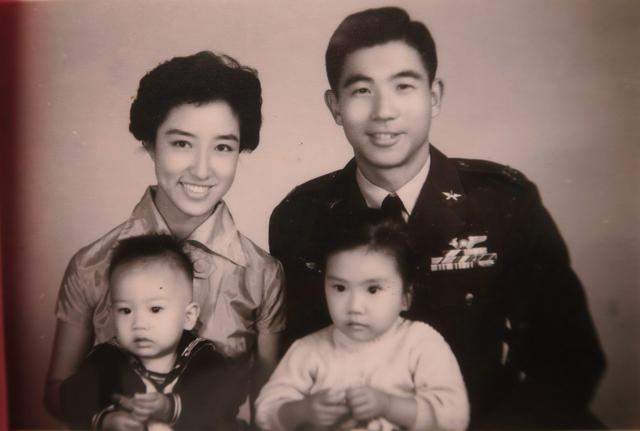
- Chang Liyi with his wife and two of their children
- Born: 7 November 1929; Nanjing, Republic of China
- Died: 12 June 2019 (aged 89); Taipei, Taiwan
- Other names: Zhang Liyi, Jack Chang
- Spouse: Chang Chia-chi
- Children: 3
- Military career
- Allegiance: Republic of China
- Branch: Republic of China Air Force
- Rank: Major
- Unit: Black Cat Squadron

Chinese name
- Traditional Chinese: 張立義
- Simplified Chinese: 张立义
Transcriptions
Standard Mandarin
- Hanyu Pinyin: Zhāng Lìyì
- Wade–Giles: Chang Li-i

Chang Liyi (Chinese: 張立義; pinyin: Zhāng Lìyì; 7 November 1929 – 12 June 2019), also known as Jack Chang, was a pilot in the Republic of China Air Force with the rank of major. A member of the CIA-trained Black Cat Squadron, he flew the American U-2 reconnaissance aircraft to spy on China's nuclear program. He was shot down on 10 January 1965 over Baotou, Inner Mongolia, and held in detention until late 1969. After being released from custody, Chang was sent back to his hometown on the mainland. In 1982 he was given permission to leave the mainland, but Taiwan refused to allow him entry until 1990, and he lived in the United States with his family in the interim.

== Early life ==
Chang was born in Nanjing, the capital of the Republic of China, on 7 November 1929. After the outbreak of the Second Sino-Japanese War, the Japanese army attacked Nanjing in December 1937. Chang's mother fled the city with the children and trekked across China for more than a year, eventually arriving in the wartime capital Chongqing in 1939. His father, who stayed behind to look after his shop, died in the Nanjing Massacre.

In 1943, the Republic of China Air Force established a youth training school in Dujiangyan, Sichuan. Chang, determined to join the military, took the entrance examination and was admitted the next year. Before his graduation, however, the Kuomintang government was losing the Chinese Civil War to the Communists and the school evacuated to Taiwan in 1948. His family was left behind in mainland China, where the Communist Party established the People's Republic of China (PRC) in 1949.

== U-2 pilot and capture ==
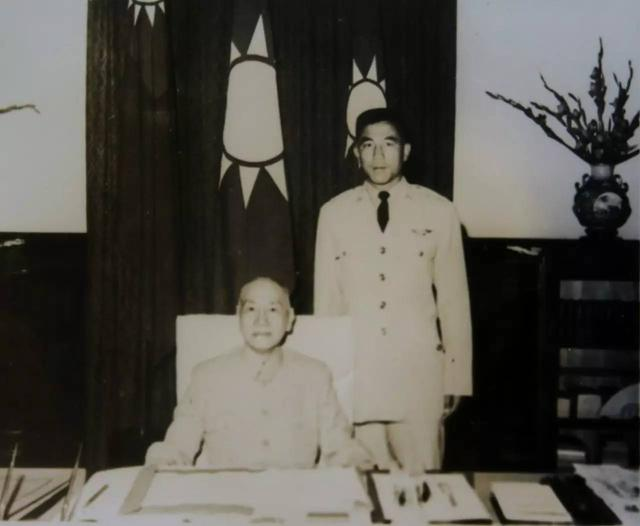
Chang Liyi being received by President Chiang Kai-shek after one of his missions

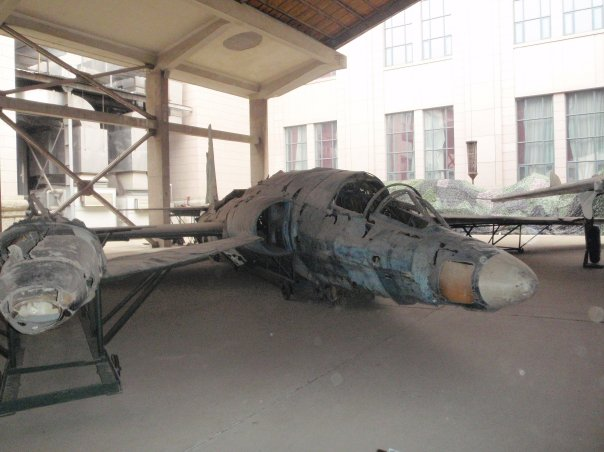
Remains of the shot-down U-2s, cannibalized and converted into a single aircraft for display at the Military Museum of the Chinese People's Revolution, Beijing.

In the late 1950s, the United States and the Republic of China government in Taiwan initiated a top-secret reconnaissance program to spy on Communist China's nuclear bomb project. To reach the project sites located deep inland in Northwest China, ROC pilots were trained by the Central Intelligence Agency in the United States to fly the Lockheed U-2 high-altitude reconnaissance aircraft. Chang was selected to receive U-2 training and joined the Black Cat Squadron in July 1964 with the rank of major.

After Communist China exploded its first nuclear bomb in October 1964, the Black Cat Squadron intensified its reconnaissance flights. On 10 January 1965, Chang flew a U-2C aircraft (No. 358) from Taiwan, on a mission to take infrared photographs of atomic bomb production facilities in Northwest China. When he flew over Baotou, Inner Mongolia, his plane was shot down by a surface-to-air missile launched by the 1st Battalion of the People's Liberation Army Air Force under the command of Wang Lin.

When his plane was hit, Chang ejected and parachuted down to a farm. He was captured and held in a guesthouse of the PLA Air Force in Beijing, guarded by four soldiers. Meanwhile, in Taiwan he was presumed killed in action and the Central Daily News reported his "death" on 12 January. The ROC Air Force built graves at the Bitan Air Force Martyrs' Cemetery (碧潭公墓) for Chang Liyi and Yeh Changti, another captured Black Cat pilot who was presumed dead.

In April 1965, four U-2 aircraft were shot down by China, including the U-2C piloted by Chang, were put on display at the Military Museum of the Chinese People's Revolution in Beijing. Decades later, Chang was invited and brought to the museum to see the wreckage of his plane.

Chang was released from detention in late 1969, almost five years after his capture. He was later sent to live in his hometown Nanjing, where he reunited with his mother and siblings for the first time in 27 years. He worked as a farmer, a factory worker, and eventually as an engineer at the Nanjing Institute of Aeronautics.

== Return to Taiwan ==
In 1982, the PRC government granted Chang and Yeh Changti permission to return to Taiwan and sent them to Hong Kong. However, Chiang Ching-kuo, then President of the Republic of China, considered them compromised and refused to take them back. Yang Shiju (楊世駒), a former commander of the Black Cat Squadron, contacted the CIA, which settled the duo in the United States. Neither pilot received a medal from the CIA, but their shoot-down had a major impact on the agency and the US Air Force, which began to prioritize the development of pilotless drones at Area 51.

Chang finally was granted permission to return to Taiwan in 1990, after the death of Chiang Ching-kuo. On 12 June 2019, Chang died from a heart attack at Songshan Hospital in Taipei. He was 89.

== Personal life ==
In 1956, Chang Liyi married Chang Chia-chi (張家淇), a fellow native of Nanjing, and they had three children. Eight years after he was shot down in 1965 and declared dead in Taiwan, she married an army officer. Still not fully convinced that Liyi was dead, she made an agreement with her second husband that she would reunite with Liyi if he would ever come back. In 1983, she met with Liyi in Hong Kong following his release from China, and expressed her guilt for having remarried while he remained single in China. After he was given permission to return to Taiwan, she divorced her second husband and remarried Liyi in April 1991. She died in August 2003 from kidney disease.
