= Taoyuan Air Base =

Taoyuan Air Base 海軍桃園基地

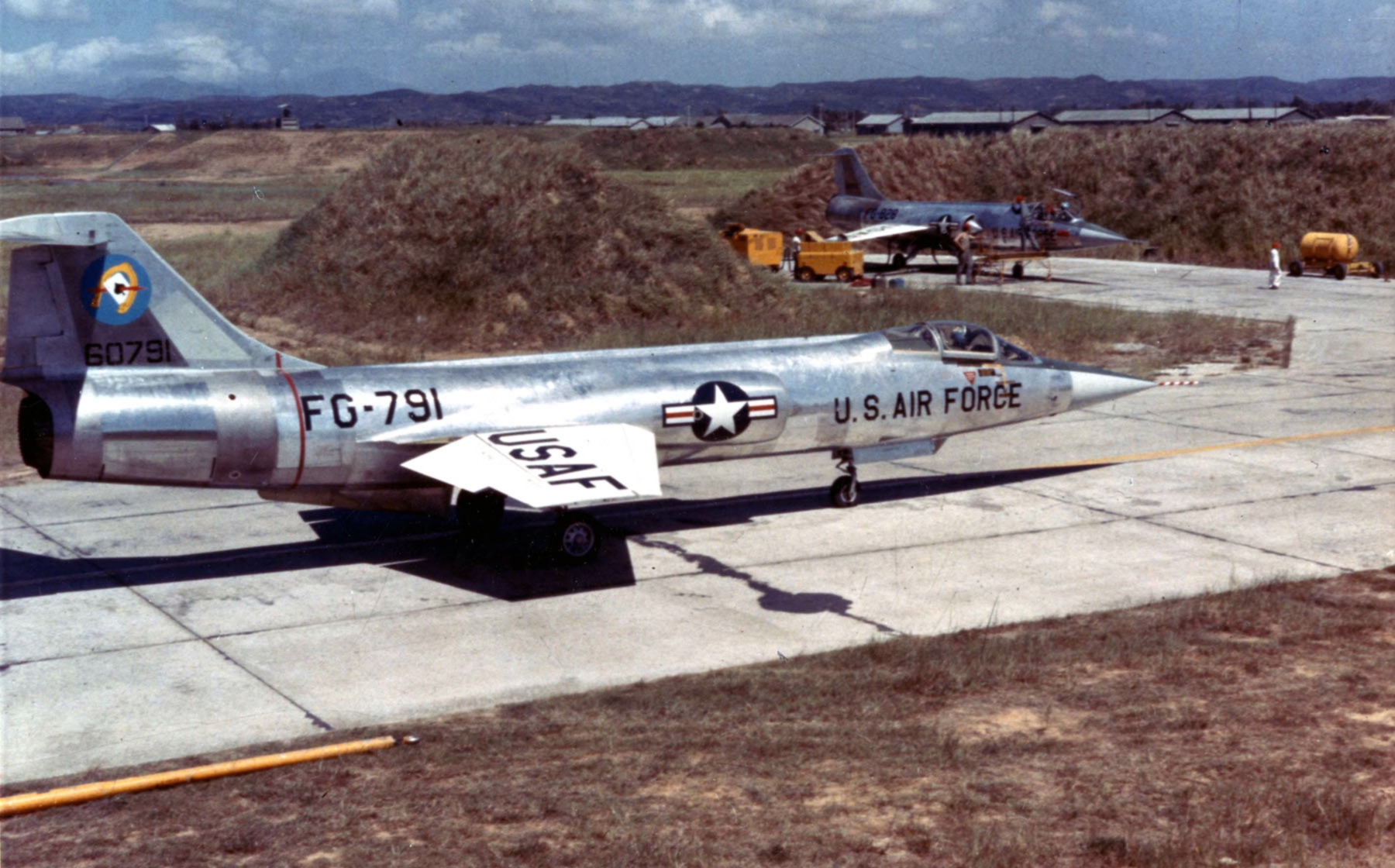
- F-104As of the 83rd Fighter Interceptor Squadron at Taoyuan Air Base in September 1958
- IATA: none; ICAO: RCGM

Summary
- Airport type: Defunct
- Operator: Taoyuan International Airport Corporation
- Location: Taoyuan City, Taiwan
- Opened: 1944
- Closed: 1 August 2013
- Coordinates: 25.050°N 121.233°E
- Interactive map of Taoyuan Air Base

Runways
Direction	Length		Surface
Direction	m	ft	Surface
05/23	3,061	10,044	Concrete/Asphalt

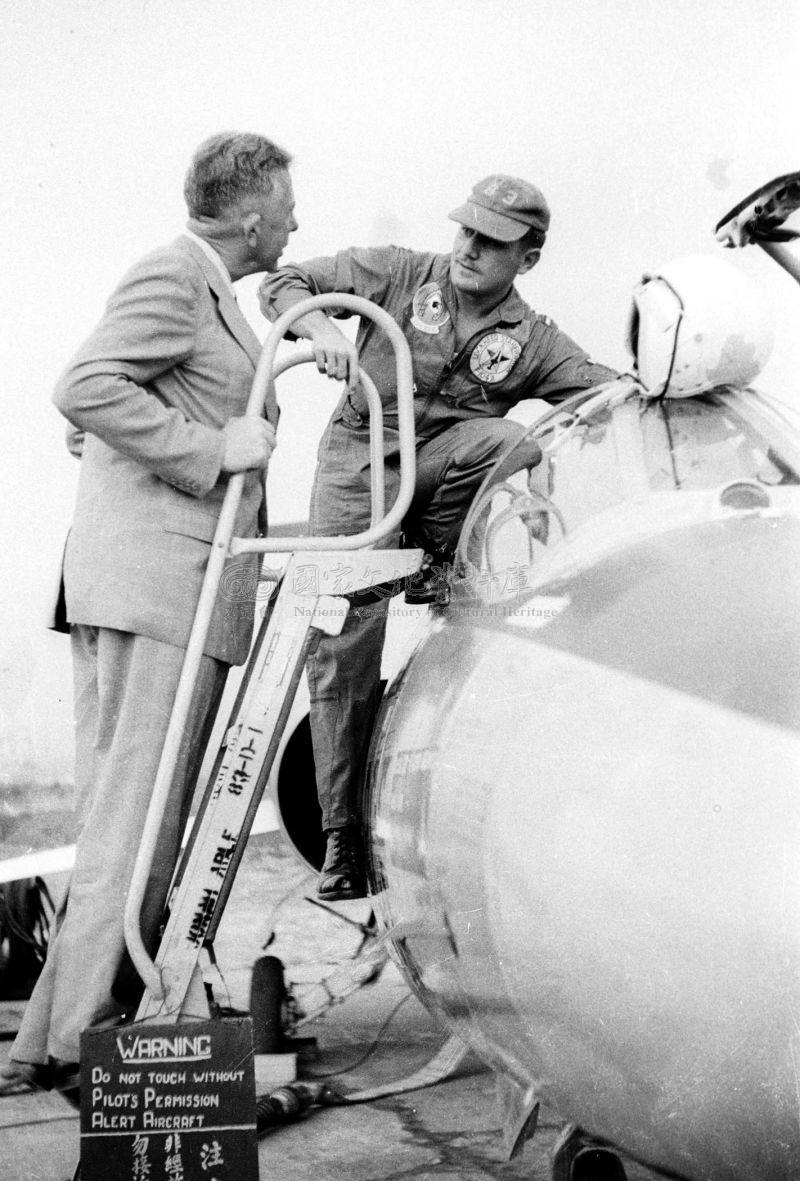
US Secretary of Defense Neil H. McElroy in Taoyuan Air Base, Taiwan, inspected the 83rd Fighter-Interceptor Squadron, 12 October 1958

Taoyuan Air Base (ICAO: RCGM) was a Republic of China Air Force base located in Taoyuan City, Taiwan, southeast of Taipei's civilian Taoyuan International Airport. In 2007, the site was turned over to the Republic of China Navy and was renamed to Taoyuan Naval Base.

== History ==
The United States Air Force's 44th Fighter-Bomber Squadron operating the F-86 Sabre was deployed here from 27 January to 17 February 1955 and again from 3–30 September 1955. In 1957 two RB-57A reconnaissance aircraft of the 6021st Reconnaissance Squadron were based here to take part in project Heartthrob missions over the People's Republic of China and these were later replaced by RB-57Ds operated as part of project Diamond Lil.

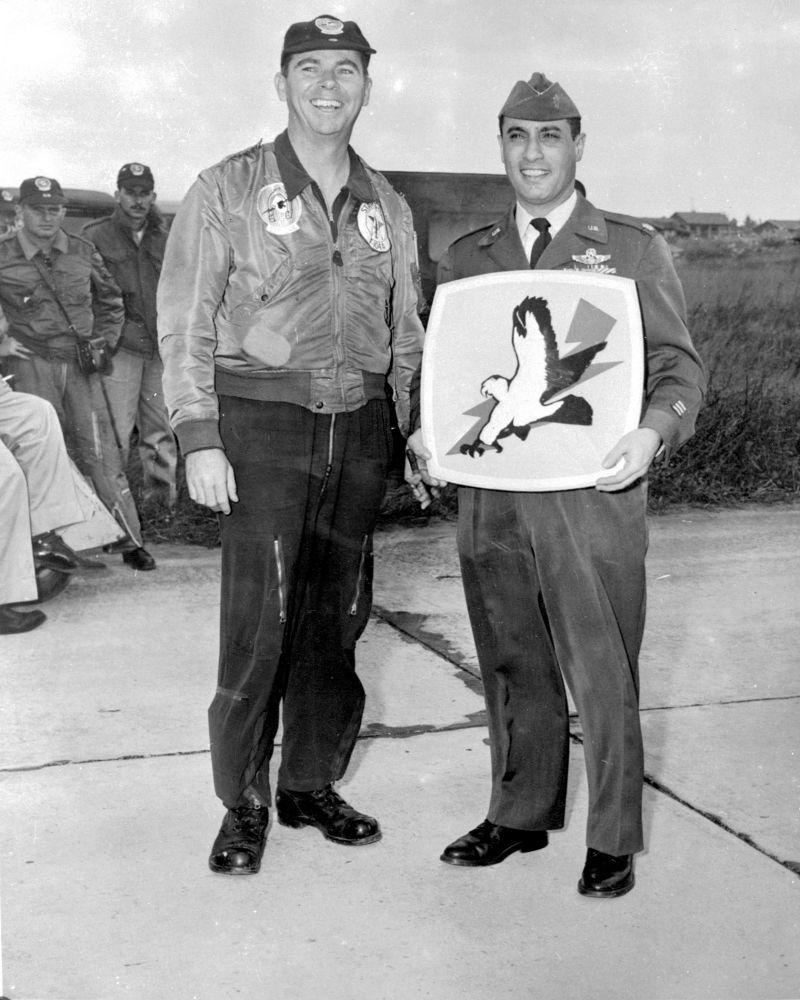
USAF 83rd Fighter Interceptor Squadron welcomed the 327th to relieve them.

On 10 September 1958, as part of the U.S. response to the 1958 Quemoy Crisis, disassembled F-104A Starfighters of the 83rd Fighter-Interceptor Squadron were airlifted by C-124s to Taoyuan where they were reassembled as part of Operation Jonah Able. The first F-104A was operational 30 hours after arriving and by 19 September the entire squadron was operational. On December 6, 1958, the men of the 83rd FIS were relieved by the men of the 337th Fighter-Interceptor Squadron under the command of Col. James Jabara and in March 1959 the F-104s were again disassembled and loaded aboard C-124s for return to the 83rd FIS at McClellan Air Force Base.

The Black Cat Squadron flying U-2 surveillance aircraft was based here from 1961 to 1974. The 5th/401st Tactical Combined Wing operating F-104 Starfighters and later F-5s was also based here.

=== Present ===
Since 2013, the site has hosted the Taoyuan Land Art Festival (Chinese: 桃園地景藝術節; pinyin: Táoyuán dì jǐng yìshù jié), featuring large sculptures from contemporary artists such as Florentijn Hofman and Zhang Huan. In 2014, after the Chung Cheng Aviation Museum was closed to make way for construction at Taoyuan International Airport, the 18 aircraft displayed there were moved to Taoyuan Naval Base.

== Accidents & incidents ==
- On 19 March, 1961 a Lockheed U-2C crashed at Taoyuan Air Base during a training mission killing Chih Yao Hua.
- In November 1965 Li Xianbin (Chinese: 李顯斌; pinyin: Lǐ Xiǎnbīn), a defecting Chinese pilot, landed his IL-28/H-5 bomber here against the wishes of his navigator Li Caiwang (李才旺; Lǐ Cáiwàng) and tail gunner Lian Baosheng (廉保生; Lián Bǎoshēng). Lian committed suicide upon landing in Taiwan.
- On November 24, 1970, a Lockheed U-2R crashed at Taoyuan Air Base during a training mission.
