= Black Bat Squadron =

34th Squadron
- (Chinese: 黑蝙蝠中隊; pinyin: hēi biānfú zhōngduì)
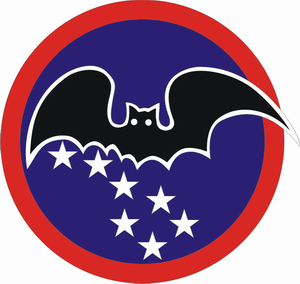
- Black Bat Squadron official emblem
- Founded: 1953
- Disbanded: 1973
- Country: Republic of China
- Role: Reconnaissance
- Nickname: Black Bat Squadron

Black Bat Squadron (Chinese: 黑蝙蝠中隊; pinyin: hēi biānfú zhōngduì), formally the 34th Squadron, was a squadron of CIA reconnaissance plane pilots and crew based in Taiwan during the Cold War. Citizens of the Republic of China flew missions over mainland China controlled by the People's Republic of China (PRC) to drop agents and gather military signal intelligence around military sites. The 34th Squadron was formed in 1953 and flew its last operational mission in 1967. The squadron's emblem was a bat and seven stars surrounded by a red ring. The bat & stars allude to night operations. The bat's wing piercing the "red circle" intentionally and the position of the stars representing the numbers 3 & 4 for its formal name; the 34th Squadron of the ROC Air Force. The unit's aircraft included the Boeing B-17G, Douglas A-26C/B-26C Invader, 7 Lockheed RB-69A, Douglas C-54, 11 Fairchild C-123B/K Provider, Lockheed C-130E Hercules, and 3 "black" Lockheed P-3A Orion (149669, 149673, 149678). The P-3As and RB-69As were armed with AIM-9 Sidewinder missiles for self-defense. 34th Squadron specialized in very low level air space penetration (100–200 meters altitude) to hug the ground in order to evade enemy radars and fighter interceptions. Later when operating P-3A, its main mission was flying in international water, 40 miles outside of mainland China, to collect signals intelligence.

Overall, from 1953 to 1967, 34th Squadron flew 838 missions, 148 Black Bat crew members - With two-thirds of the Squadron - went down with 15 aircraft. A few were captured after being shot down and later released in Hong Kong.

The squadron's last operational mission was flown in May 1969. This was the epic operation Heavy Tea. After the failure of the Black Cat Squadron to plant operating sensor pods near the Lop Nur Nuclear Weapons Test Base, the CIA developed a plan to deploy two battery-powered sensor pallets near the base. To deploy the pallets, a Black Bat crew was trained in the US to fly the C-130 Hercules. The crew of 12, led by Col Sun Pei Zhen, took off from Takhli Royal Thai Air Force Base in an unmarked US Air Force C-130E on 17 May. Flying for six and a half hours at low altitude in the dark, they arrived over the target and the sensor pallets were dropped by parachute near Anxi in Gansu province. After another six and a half hours of low altitude flight, they arrived back at Takhli. The sensors worked and uploaded data to a US intelligence satellite for six months, before their batteries wore out. The Chinese conducted two nuclear tests, on 22 September 1969 and 29 September 1969, during the operating life of the sensor pallets. Another mission to the area was planned as operation Golden Whip, but was called off in 1970.

After the 34th Squadron stopped flying over and near mainland China, they moved to special operations over Vietnam, until 1972. 12 members of 34th SQ also involved in CIA's Project Main Street in 1971 to 1972, involving tapping North Vietnam's communication link.

As of 2013, The "Black Bat" squadron has been reactivated as the 134th Squadron under 6th T/EWW (439th CW) in Taiwan, and is operating the S-2Ts that used to be under the ROCN.

This is not to be confused with another top-secret squadron of the ROCAF—The Black Cat Squadron. This 35th Squadron flew U-2 high altitude reconnaissance plane provided by the CIA, losing five aircraft and three ROCAF pilots to PRC air defenses. Their flight provided valuable intelligence deep inside mainland China, specifically China's atomic bomb development. The Black Cat Squadron was disbanded in 1973, and 2 remaining U-2R were returned to US by 1974.

Director Ting Wen-chin (Dīng Wénjìng 丁雯靜) made a documentary about them entitled The Secret Hidden in the Sky of Taiwan (Táiwān tiānkōng de mìmi 臺灣天空的祕密).

== Accidents and incidents ==
- On 25 March 1960, an RB-69A/P2V-7U(7101/140442/54-4040) crashed into a hill near Kunsan Air Base, South Korea, during a low-level ferry flight from Hsinchu City, Taiwan to a staging area in Kunsan, South Korea. All 14 aircrew on board were killed.
- On 6 November 1961, an RB-69A/P2V-7U(7099/140440/54-4039) conducting a low-level penetration flight over mainland China was shot down by ground fire over Liaodong peninsula. All 14 aircrew on board were killed in action.
- On 8 January 1962, a RB-69A/P2V-7U(7097/140438/54-4038) crashed into the Korea Bay while conducting ELINT and leaflet dropping missions. All 14 aircrew on board were killed in action.
- On 19 June 1963, a RB-69A/P2V-7U(7105/141233/54-4041) was conducting ELINT mission over mainland China, and was shot down by a PLAAF MiG-17PF over Linchuan, Jiangxi, after being intercepted repeatedly by multiple MiG-17PFs and Tu-4Ps. All 14 aircrew on board were killed in action.
- On 11 June 1964, a RB-69A/P2V-7U (7047/135612/54-4037) was conducting ELINT mission over mainland China, and was shot down by a PLANAF MiG-15 over the Shandong peninsula, after being intercepted by MiG-15s and Il-28s. All 13 aircrew on board were killed in action.

== See also ==
- Black Bat Squadron Memorial Hall
- 12th Tactical Reconnaissance Squadron (ROCAF)
