= Republic of China Air Force =

Aviation branch of the armed forces of Taiwan

- Emblem of the Republic of China Air Force
- Founded: 1920; 106 years ago (military aviation); 17 August 1946; 80 years ago (in its current form)
- Country: Republic of China (Taiwan)
- Branch: Air force
- Type: Air force
- Role: Aerial warfare
- Size: 35,000 active personnel (2023); 90,000 reservists (2023); 577 aircraft (2023)
- Part of: Republic of China Armed Forces
- Garrison/HQ: Zhongshan, Taipei
- Website: air.mnd.gov.tw (in Chinese) air.mnd.gov.tw/EN/Home/index.aspx (in English)

Commanders
- Commander: General Cheng Jung-feng
- Deputy Commander: Lieutenant-General Liu Feng-yu
- Chief Master Sergeant: Master Sergeant Pang Mao-Hsiung

Insignia
- Roundel

- Flag

- Unit colour

Aircraft flown
- Electronic warfare: E-2T/K, C-130HE
- Fighter: F-CK-1C/D, F-16V/B/AM/BM/A/Block 20
- Helicopter: EC225LP, S-70C, UH-60M
- Interceptor: Mirage 2000-5DI/EI
- Patrol: P-3C
- Reconnaissance: RF-16
- Trainer: T-34C, AT-3B, T-5
- Transport: C-130H, Fokker 50, Beechcraft B-1900C, Boeing 737–800

Chinese name
- Traditional Chinese: 中華民國空軍
- Simplified Chinese: 中华民国空军
Transcriptions
Standard Mandarin
- Hanyu Pinyin: Zhōnghuá Mínguó Kōngjūn
- Bopomofo: ㄓㄨㄥ ㄏㄨㄚˊ ㄇㄧㄣˊ ㄍㄨㄛˊ ㄎㄨㄥ ㄐㄩㄣ
- Wade–Giles: Chunghua Minkuo Kongchün
- Tongyong Pinyin: Jhōnghuá Mínguó Kōngjyūn
other Mandarin
- Xiao'erjing: ژْوڭخُوَا مِنْقُوَ كٗوڭجُنْ
Hakka
- Romanization: Chûng-fà Mìn-koet Khung-kiûn
Yue: Cantonese
- Jyutping: Zong1-waa4 Man4-gwok3 Hong1-gwan1
Southern Min
- Hokkien POJ: Tiong-huâ Bîn-kok Khong-kun

The Republic of China Air Force (ROCAF; Chinese: 中華民國空軍; pinyin: Zhōnghuá Mínguó Kōngjūn), known colloquially as the Taiwanese Air Force (臺灣空軍; Táiwān Kōngjūn), is the military aviation branch of the Republic of China (Taiwan) Armed Forces.

The history of the ROCAF traces back to 1920, when military aviation was first introduced by the Kuomintang within its National Revolutionary Army as its air force. It later became a fully independent service branch from 17 August 1946 under the name Chinese Air Force.

The ROCAF's primary mission is the defense of the airspace over and around the Taiwan Area under the territorial jurisdiction of the government of the Republic of China (Taiwan). Priorities of the ROCAF include the development of long range reconnaissance and surveillance networks, integrating C4ISTAR systems to increase battle effectiveness, procuring counterstrike weapons, next generation fighters, and hardening airfields and other facilities to survive a surprise attack.

== Organization ==
Like most of the other branches of the ROC armed forces, much of the ROCAF's structure and organization is patterned after the United States Air Force. Like the USAF, the ROCAF used to have a wing → group → squadron structure. After November 2004, tactical fighter wing switch to wing → Tactical Fighter Group, with some fighter squadrons stood down, with each tactical fighter group, still pretty much the same size as a squadron, now commanded by a full colonel.

The main operational units in Taiwan Air Force include:

- 6 tactical combat aircraft wings.
- 1 transport and antisubmarine wing.
- 1 tactical control wing.
- 1 communication and ATC wing.
- 1 weather forecasting wing.
- 1 Air Defense and Artillery command, comprising combat control center, 5 Brigade, 16 air defense artillery battalions.

=== Republic of China Air Force Command Headquarters ===
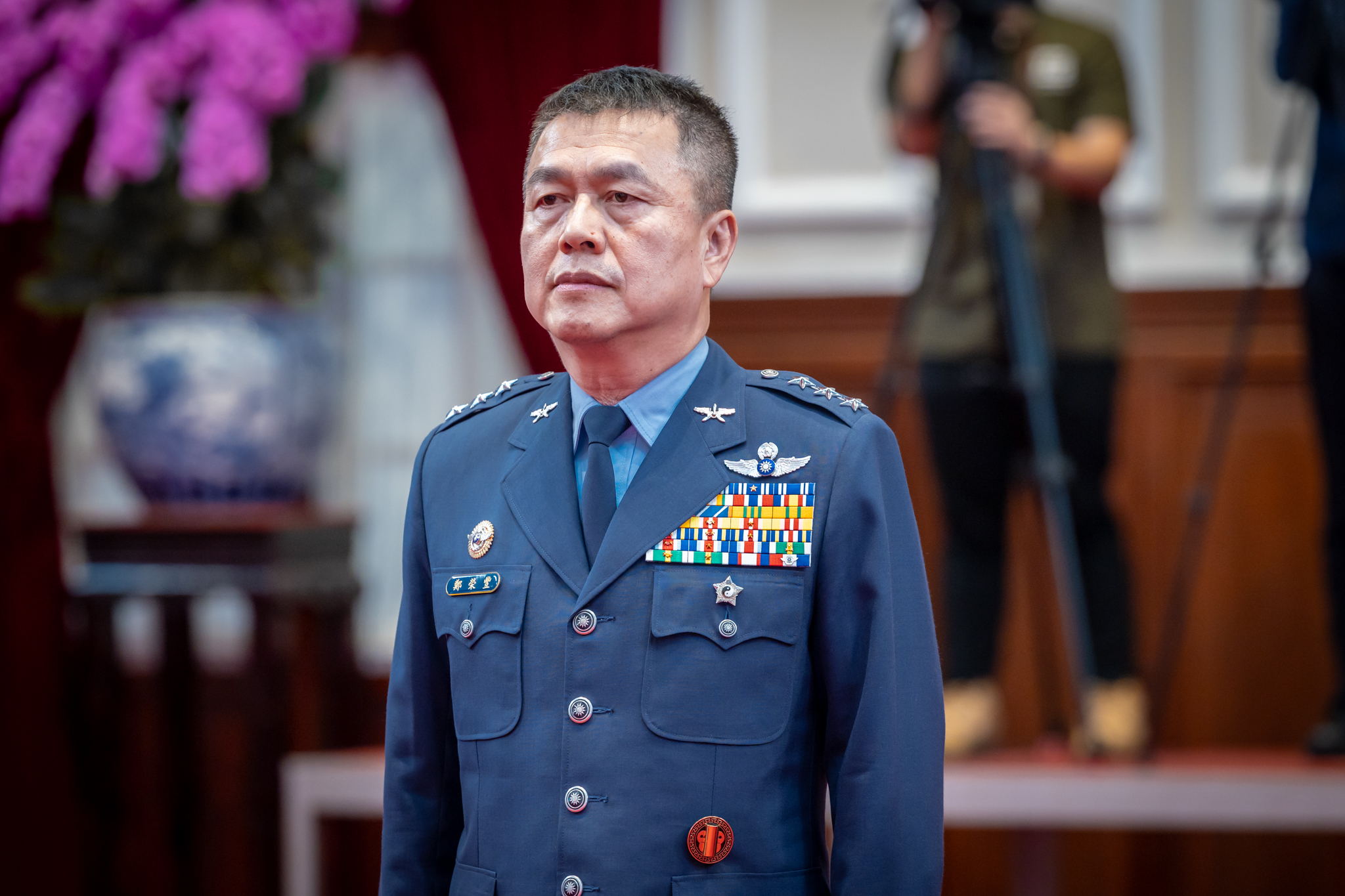
General Cheng Jung-feng, the current Commanding-General

Air Force GHQ is subordinate to the Chief of the General Staff (military), the Minister of National Defense (civilian) and the President.
- Internal Units: Personnel, Combat Readiness and Training, Logistics, Planning, Communications, Electronics & Information, General Affairs, Comptroller, Inspector General, Political Warfare.
- Republic of China Air Force Academy
- Aviation Science and Technology Development Center

==== Major commands ====
- Air Force Combatant Command

- Weather Wing: Tamsui, New Taipei City
- Communications, Air Traffic Control & Information Wing : Taipei City
- Air Tactical Control Wing

- Ground fixed and mobile long-range air search radar sites, consist of various TPS-117, TPS-75V, FPS-117, GE-592 and HADR radars, plus 1 PAVE PAWS (Phased Array Warning System) early warning radar site in northern Taiwan, will enter service late 2012.

- Air Force Maintenance and Support Command
- Air Force Air Defense and Missile Command

- 5 Air Force Air Defense and Artillery Brigade:791st Brigade, 792nd Brigade, 793rd Brigade, 794th Brigade,795th Brigade

- 2 Air Defense Missile I-HAWK battalions, 621st, and 623rd battalions, with 9 companies/batteries.
- 2 TK-1/2 Air Defense Missile battalion, 793rd Brigade, 611th battalion with 6 companies/batteries.
- 4 TK-3 Air Defense Missile battalion, 792nd Brigade.
- 3 Patriot PAC-2+ GEM/PAC-3 Air Defense/Anti-Ballistic Missile battalion, with 9 mixed companies/batteries that are all upgrading to PAC-3 standard, with 6 more PAC 3 companies/batteries on order.
- 1 Skyguard Short Range Airbase Air Defense battalion, with 6 companies/batteries and radar sub units with OTO 35 mm AAA, s
- 2 Antelope Short Range Airbase Air Defense battalions, with unknown companies/batteries.
- At least 2 AAA Air Defense Artillery battalions, with 40 mm/L70 and 20 mm AAA guns.

- Air Defense Artillery Training Center: Pingtung
  - Target Service Squadron
  - Education Service Support Company
  - First training company
  - Second training company
  - Third training company

- Education, Training & Doctrine Command

==== Combat wings ====
Combat wing	Combat group/squadron	Air base	Model
Air Force Songshan Base Command	Special Transport Squadron, Presidential Flight	Songshan Airport, Taipei, Taiwan	Beech 1900, Fokker 50, Boeing 737–800
Air Force Makung Base Command	1 detachment	Makung Airport, Huxi, Taiwan	AIDC F-CK-1 Ching-kuo
1st (443rd) Tactical Fighter Wing	1st, 3rd, 9th Tactical Fighter Groups	Tainan Air Base, Tainan, Taiwan Penghu Airport, Magong, Penghu	AIDC F-CK-1 Ching-kuo
2nd (499th) Tactical Fighter Wing	41st and 42nd Tactical Fighter Groups, 48th Training Group	Hsinchu Air Base, Hsinchu, Taiwan	Mirage 2000-5
3rd (427th) Tactical Fighter Wing	7th and 28th Tactical Fighter Groups	Ching Chuan Kang Air Base, Taichung, Taiwan	AIDC F-CK-1 Ching-kuo
4th (455th) Tactical Fighter Wing	21st, 22nd, 23rd Tactical Fighter Groups, Air Rescue Group	Chiayi Air Base, Chiayi, Taiwan	F-16AM/BM, Sikorsky S-70, UH-60M, EC-225
5th (401st) Tactical Fighter Wing	17th, 26th, 27th, Tactical Fighter Groups, 12th Tactical Reconnaissance Squadron	Hualien Airport; Chiashan Air Force Base, Hualien, Taiwan	F-16AM/BM, RF-16
6th (439th) Tactical Mixed Wing	10th Tactical Airlift Group, 20th EW Group, 2nd and 6th EW Squadrons	Pingtung Air Base, Pingtung, Taiwan; Kinmen Airport, Kinmen; Dongsha Airport; Taiping Island Airport	E-2K, C-130H, P-3C
7th (737th) Tactical Fighter Wing	7th Tactical Fighter Group	Chihhang Air Base, Taitung, Taiwan	F-16C/D, T-5
Flight training command	Air Force Academy	Gangshan Air Base, Kaohsiung, Taiwan	T-5, T-34

== History ==
=== Early ===
During the Qing dynasty, aircraft operations first began at the Beijing Nanyuan airfield in 1909, just before the end of their rule following the Double Ten Revolution in 1911, and Nanyuan airfield became the place where Chinese military aviation begins.

In July 1917, Qing loyalist general Zhang Xun led the Manchu Restoration, and then-Premier of the Republic Duan Qirui ordered the aerial bombing of the Forbidden City; the mission was carried out in a Caudron Type D aircraft piloted by Pan Shizhong (潘世忠) and bombardier Du Yuyuan (杜裕源) flying out of Nanyuan airfield, dropping three bombs over the Forbidden City, which caused the fatality of a eunuch, but otherwise inflicted minor damage.

On 29 November 1920, the Chinese Nationalist Party (Kuomintang, KMT) established the "Aviation Department" within the National Revolutionary Army commanding structure, began with four Curtiss JN-4 "Jenny" training aircraft. The "Aviation Department" was reformed into "Aviation Ministry" on 1 November 1928, and later on 17 August 1933, the "Aviation Ministry" was expanded as the Aviation Affairs Commission (Chinese: 航空委員會) directly under the Military Affairs Commission, thereby technically the arrangement was more like an "army air service". The "Command Post of the Air Force" served as the executive body of the Aviation Affairs Commission.

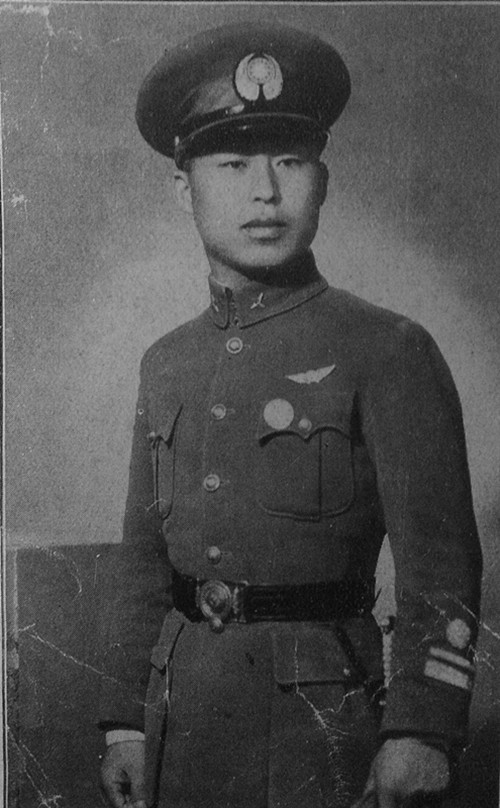
Chinese Nationalist Air Force ace Second Sino-Japanese War, Colonel Kao Chih-hang

The "Nationalist Air Force", emerged as a centralised air arm during the 1930s, consolidating various provincial warlord air units and integrating overseas Chinese aviators. This unification gained urgency in the 1930s as Imperial Japan expanded its aggression in East Asia. Notably, the Kwangsi Clique, was the last major faction to merge into the central air command in November 1937, shortly before their airmen earned recognition at the Battle of T’aierhchuang

The Air Force first engaged Japanese forces during the 28 January Incident of 1932; the Japanese launched combat aircraft from Hungchiao Aerodrome in Shanghai, as well as Type 3 fighters and Type 13 attack-bombers from the aircraft carriers Hōshō and Kaga, where a Chinese Junkers K 47 engaged them in a dogfight on their raid over Qiaosi Air Base, with neither side losing aircraft, however U.S. Reserve Lt. Robert McCawley Short, while ferrying Chinese aircraft, scored an aerial victory before being shot down killed in action. His posthumous promotion to colonel marked the early involvement of foreign personnel in Chinese air operations.

By the start of the Second Sino-Japanese War/World War II (1937–45), the Air Force operated Curtiss Hawk IIs/IIIs, Boeing P-26s, and Fiat CR.32s as frontline fighters, while bomber/attack aircraft included A-12 Shrikes, He-111s, Northrop Gammas. On 14 August 1937 — "Air Force Memorial Day” — Chinese Hawk IIIs of the 4th Pursuit Group under Col. Kao Chih-hang intercepted Japanese G3M bombers over Chienchiao Aerodrome, commemorating the first major aerial battle engagement of the Second Sino-Japanese War/WWII. Chinese-American volunteer combat aviators (e.g. Art Chin, John Wong Pan-yang, et al.) as well as former warlord-air force aviators (e.g. Cen Zeliu, Zhu Jiaxun, et al.) valiantly distinguished themselves in service to the Republic of China Air Force. As the war progressed, the Chinese Air Force remained a viable fighting force with replenishment Polikarpov I-15 and I-16 fighter planes, as well as a volunteer group of Soviet pilots, all made possible under the 1937 Sino-Soviet Non-Aggression Pact.

As major cities like Shanghai, Nanjing, and Taiyuan fell, and the cutting off of high-octane aviation fuel supplies and war material increased, the Chinese wartime capital was pushed-back to Wuhan under Japan's superior aircraft production, technological development and training regiment, further widening of the performance gap. In 1938, Chinese Martin B-10 bombers led by Captain Hsu Huang-Sheng conducted a then-unprecedented long-range leaflet-dropping raid over Japanese cities, "alerting the conscience of the Japanese people" of the imperialist Japanese aggressions and war crimes in China; one of the earliest Chinese attempts at strategic psychological warfare.

As the Chinese faced further setbacks under the Imperial Japanese juggernaut, the Chinese Air Force was forced to withdraw into the mountainous Sichuan interior, now having to resist the increased brutality of the massed-terror carpet-bombing campaigns of Operations “100”, “101” and "102" against new wartime capital Chongqing. Codebreaking efforts went both ways, with the Japanese naval intelligence compromising Chinese air defences, and Chinese intelligence compromising joint-strike bombing campaigns by the IJAAS and IJNAS. The introduction of the Mitsubishi A6M Zero in 1940–41 gave Japan near-total air dominance. This overwhelming aerial dominance contributed to the Japanese high command's confidence in launching Operation Z, the strategic planning for the attack on Pearl Harbor.

Following the Soviet withdrawal in 1939, China was largely on its own, however after the Empire of Japan invaded French Indochina, the United States imposed an oil and steel embargo against Japan and included China in the Lend-Lease Act of 1941. The American Volunteer Group (AVG), or “Flying Tigers,” arrived later in 1941 with Curtiss P-40s to protect the Allied supply route over “The Hump” from India to Kunming.

After the Pearl Harbor attack, direct U.S. military aid increased in earnest as successful war against the Empire of Japan relied on keeping the Chinese well-supplied. By late 1941, the Chinese Air Force had only 364 operational aircraft, but Lend-Lease deliveries in 1942—P-40s, A-29s, and P-43s—restored some capacity. In 1944, the Chinese-American Composite Wing (Provisional) was formed, integrating Chinese and U.S. personnel under the USAAF Fourteenth Air Force. The Chinese-American wing fielded modern aircraft and proved highly effective in joint operations, helping turn the tide of the air war in China's favour during the final years of World War II.

On 16 August 1946, the "Aviation Affairs Commission" was reorganised as the "Air Force Command Headquarters" in the Ministry of National Defense, and the Chinese Nationalist air force was officially given the name Republic of China Air Force (Chinese: 中華民國空軍).

=== Retreat to Taiwan ===
From 1946 to 1948, during the Chinese Civil War, the ROCAF participated in combat against the People's Liberation Army, prior to the Retreat of the nationalist regime to Taiwan. The Air Force GHQ was evacuated to Taiwan along with the rest of the Republic of China Government in April 1949 following the defeat of the nationalist regime in the Chinese Civil War on mainland. Nevertheless, the ROCAF, particularly the P-51 aircraft fleet, provided effective assistance to the ROC ground forces in halting the PLA advance during the Battle of Kuningtou on Kinmen.

After the outbreak of the Korean War, to reequip the ROCAF, the United States first handed over surplus piston-engined combat aircraft to the ROCAF, include F-47D, additional F-51D, and F-47N. From 1954 then the United States supplied the ROCAF with military jet aircraft, at the beginning, include the T-33A and the F-84G, and then later the F-86F.

Before and during the First Taiwan Strait Crisis, the ROCAF was involved in combat air patrols over the Taiwan Strait and engaged Chinese communist forces, include the air force and the naval aviation branch, on several occasions. The ROCAF claimed 32 aerial victories during those operations with the loss of only 2 aircraft of its own. One of those aerial victories was the first successful kill scored by an air-to-air missile, in human military history, which was accomplished by an ROCAF F-86 Sabre fighter aircraft with then experimental AIM-9 Sidewinder.

=== Cold War ===
In according to the Sino-American Mutual Defense Treaty, the ROCAF received large number of additional equipment from the United States during the cold war, included but not limited to the T-33A, T-38A, B-57B, F-84G, F-84F, F-86D, F-100A, F-101C, F-104G and F-5E/F.

ROCAF aviators also flew U-2 recon overflights of the PRC during this time with assistance from the USAF. Known as the Black Cat Squadron they flew a total of 220 missions, with 102 missions over mainland China, losing 5 aircraft. All five were shot down by SA-2 surface-to-air missiles, the same type of surface-to-air missile that shot down Gary Powers over the USSR in 1960. The 34th "Black Bat Squadron" flew low level missions into China as part of its mapping PRC growing air defense networks, conducting ESM and ECM missions, inserting agents behind enemy lines, and air drop resupply missions.

Taiwan formed an important part of the US's cold war era air and missile defense perimeter with a network of radar stations integrated with the United States Taiwan Defense Command developed in the 1950s and expanded in the subsequent decades. These included a high altitude (2,600 meters) radar station above Leshan. Some of these stations had assigned USAF weapons officers.

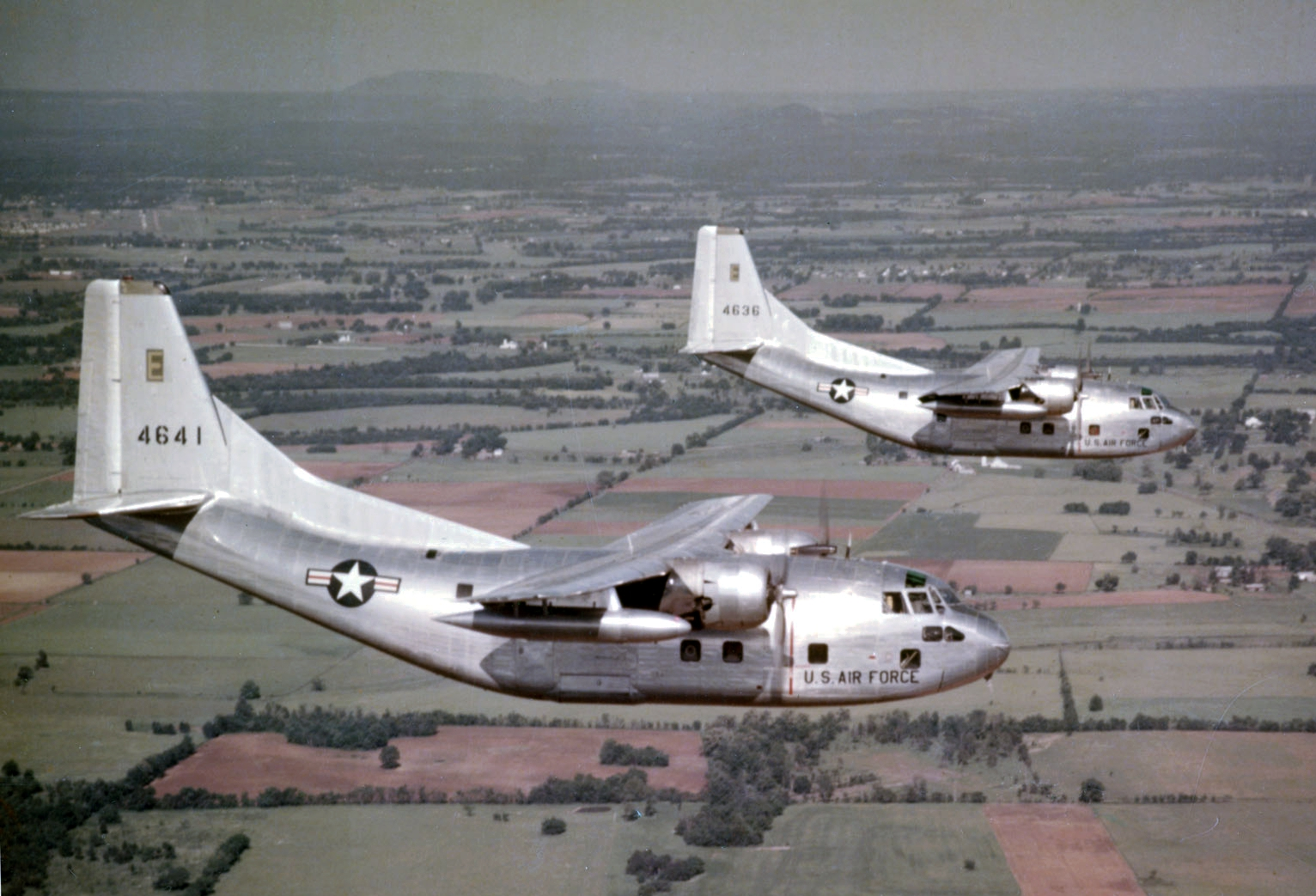
C-123Bs in flight over US 1950s, Aircraft 641 was later transferred to Taiwan to support CIA operations

Starting in November 1967, the ROC secretly operated a cargo transport detachment to assist the US and the ROV as part of its participation in the Vietnam War. It was based on existing formation of the 34th squadron of ROC Air force. The unit's strength included two C-123 cargo aircraft, seven flight officers and two mechanics, even though a higher number of military personnel was involved through rotation. It was tasked with air transportation, airdrop and electronic reconnaissance. Some 25 members of the unit were killed, among them 17 pilots and co-pilots, and three aircraft were lost. Other ROC involvement in Vietnam included a secret listening station, special reconnaissance and raiding squads, military advisers and civilian airline operations (which cost a further two aircraft due to Vietnamese individually operated AA missiles).

The radar network was upgraded in the 1970s under the Sky Net (Tianwang) program. FPS-43 radars were procured, existing FPS-88 radars were upgraded to FPS-110s and a new 1,000-meter elevation radar site was constructed on a mountain north of Taipei. Sky Net was activated in 1979.

From 1979 to 1990, the ROCAF engaged in a classified military aid program in the Yemen Arab Republic, known as the Great Desert Program. The program started after American President Jimmy Carter rushed 14 F-5s to the Yemeni Air Force who had no pilots or ground crew trained to operate the type or even any Western aircraft (they previously operated MiG-15s). The Americans and the Saudis (who were bankrolling the Yemen Arab Republic's military) requested military aid from Taiwan who provided 80 F-5 pilots, ground crews, early warning radars, and anti-aircraft missile batteries. All told more than a thousand ROCAF personnel were deployed to Yemen. The detachment in Yemen was normally commanded by a lieutenant colonel who reported to the military attaché in Saudi Arabia.

The opposing Air Force of South Yemen was made up of Cuban pilots and maintainers with some Soviet advisors and pilots as well. The ROCAF force were actively involved in combat with the Cubans/Soviets and for all intents and purposes constitutes the Yemen Arab Republic's Air Force during this time. Taiwanese pilots scored a number of kills in Yemen. The program ended in 1990 when Saudi Arabia withdrew its diplomatic recognition of Taiwan.

=== Modern era ===
In the 1990s the Air Force embarked on an air and missile defense upgrade, the Chiangwang system. This system was designed to have higher levels of automation and make use of the Air Force's new E-2T Hawkeyes. AN/FPS-117 and AN/FPS-77 were procured. The Leshan site was upgraded with a PAVE PAWS long range early warning and surveillance radar. The Chiangwang system was replaced by the Huanwang system which makes widespread use of Link-16 and newer computers. The Huanwang system was the first to allow for all command centers to share a common understanding of the battlespace and is integrated with Army and Navy systems.

The transition to democracy was difficult for the ROCAF and the Taiwanese military overall. During the martial law period the military was a pillar of totalitarianism and dictatorship and for this reason was mistrusted by the Taiwanese public. Spending and personnel levels fell from the beginning of democratization until the Tsai Ing-wen administration began increasing military spending in 2016. Efforts have been made to enhance the status of the military in the eyes of the public.

In May 2005, the Ministry of National Defense indicated its intention to transfer command of all defensive missile systems to the ROCAF, while future offensive missiles would be placed under a newly formed missile command. As of 2006, all medium and long range SAM units were transferred from ROC Army's Missile Command to ROCAF, while ROCAF's airbase security units were transferred to ROC Army Military Police. However, it was revealed that in January 2011, five years of problems of integrating those long range ex-ROC Army SAM units into ROCAF has forced ROCAF high command to return those units back to ROC Army's Missile Command. Missile Command is now directly under Defense Ministry's GHQ control.

In July 2010, former United States Air Force deputy undersecretary for international affairs, Bruce Lemkin, said that Taiwan's ability to defend its airspace had degraded due to its aging fighters and that the sale of new US fighter aircraft to Taiwan was an urgent priority. However, the ROC Air Force has trouble getting fighter planes from abroad due to mainland China's attempts to suppress fighter sales from any country. The People's Republic of China has called the F-16 fighter or any foreign fighter sales a "red line". It is believed that mainland China plans to eliminate the ROC Air Force by preventing any sale of new aircraft whilst gradually wearing its ageing fighters into an inoperable state as they have to frequently intercept PLAAF aircraft who perform almost daily approaches to ROC airspace. According to the former Republic of China's defense minister, Yen Teh-fa, the People's Republic of China sends about 2,000 bomber patrols per year to the Taiwan Strait separating Taiwan and mainland China. These patrols significantly increased since 2019 and now routinely crosses the median line in Taiwan's air defense zones, causing the scrambling of fighters. These air scrambles put heavy strain on ROC airforce aircraft and cost around 9% of Taiwan's national defense budget or about T$25.5 billion ($886.49 million) in 2020 alone.

ROCAF strategy until some years ago was to use IDF fighters for low altitude interception and ground attack, F-16s for mid-altitude interception and ground attack and Mirage 2000-5s for high altitude interception. Taiwan had to upgrade F-5 fighters due to issues in buying modern fighters. In proposed defense policy, the ROCAF seeks to deny the PLAAF air operations around Taiwan by deploying integrated air defenses, including Patriot PAC-3 batteries and Tian Kung-2/3 surface to air missiles assigned to defend air bases, and smaller mobile air defense systems to prevent the PLA from providing air support to invading forces. The ROCAF has been under increasing financial and physical pressure due to an increase in PLA Air Force intrusions into Taiwanese airspace and subsequent interception by Taiwanese fighters.

On 29 November 2020, the ROCAF celebrated its 100th birthday. On the event of their 100th birthday Taiwanese President Tsai Ing-wen commended the "loyal and fearless heroes" of the Air Force and added that "The sound of the roaring engine is our guardian, the voice of democracy and freedom."

In August 2019, the Trump administration of the United States approved the sale of 66 new Lockheed Martin F-16C/D Block 70 fighter aircraft, worth up to $8 billion to Taiwan. The first aircraft was handed over to the ROCAF on 29 March 2025 in the Lockheed Martin Plant in Greenville, South Carolina.

The ROCAF retired the last of its Northrop F-5s in 2025, the type had first entered service in 1965.

==== Humanitarian operations ====
The ROCAF has also taken part in numerous humanitarian operations. Some of the more major ones include the following:

- Indian Ocean earthquake and tsunami, December 2004
- Haiti earthquake, January 2010
- Typhoon Haiyan, November 2013

== Equipment and procurement ==
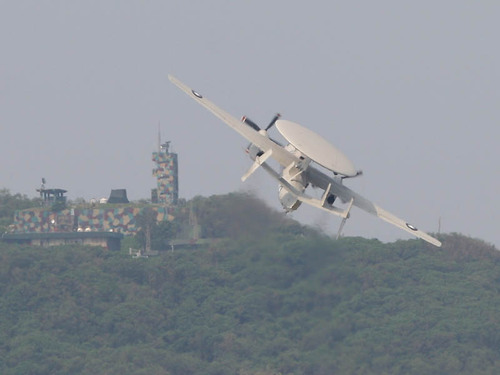
ROCAF E-2K take-off from Chihhang Air Force Base

=== Inventory ===
Current ROCAF inventory includes over 400 combat aircraft, the mainstays being the AIDC F-CK-1 Ching-kuo IDF (Indigenous Defense Fighter) and F-16, while the Mirage 2000–5 is the primary interceptor aircraft.

The United States serves as the ROCAF's main supplier of equipment and also provides training for ROCAF and ROC Navy pilots at Luke AFB in Arizona. This base which is between Phoenix and Tucson has an instrumented flight area for training approximately the size of the State of Connecticut. As of 2019 the US Air Force is assisting the Taiwanese Air Force in sourcing new and surplus F-5 parts.

=== Domestic development ===
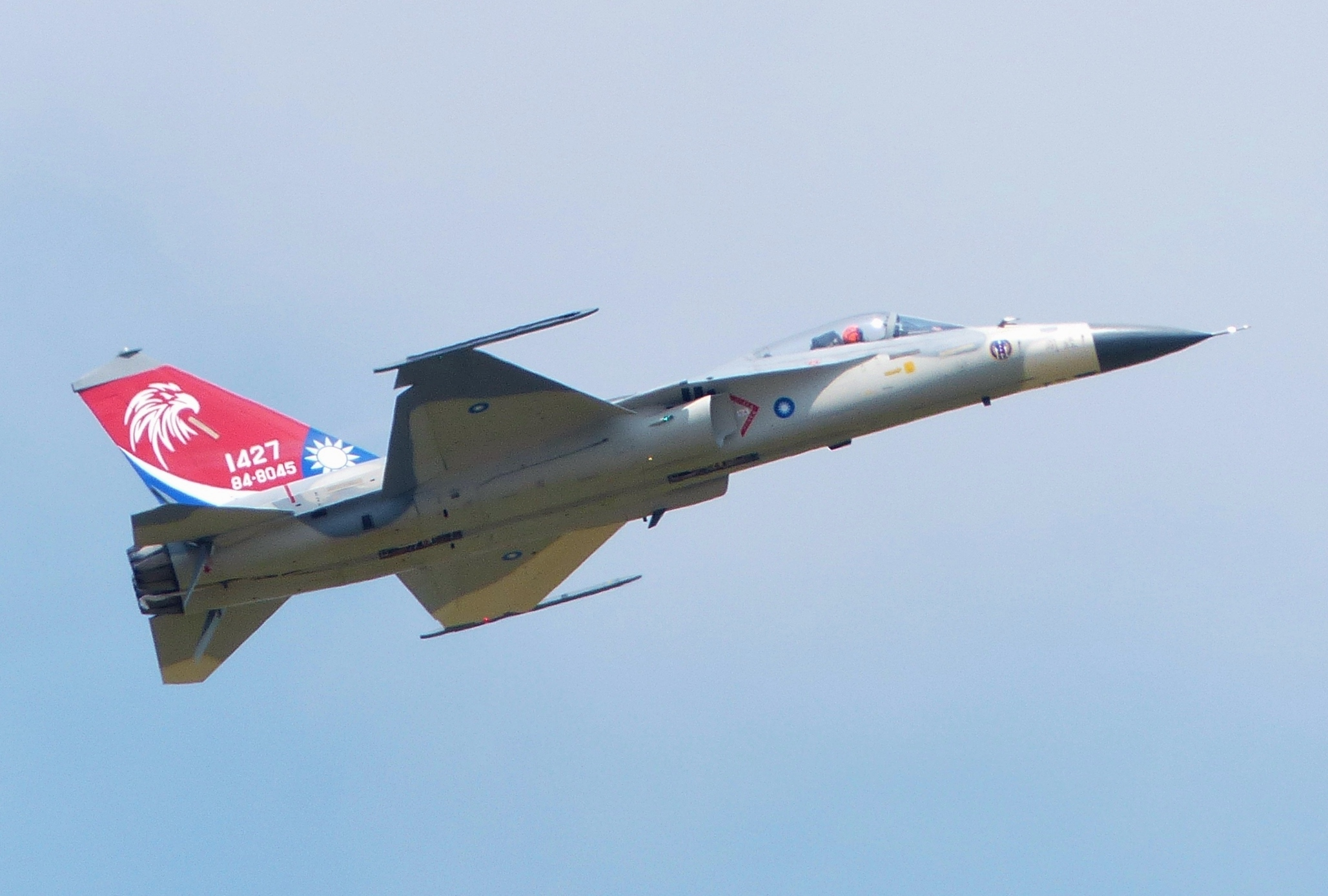
An F-CK-1A on a demo flight

Prior to 1984, ROCAF fighters were almost exclusively American-made aircraft sold under terms of a mutual defense treaty between the Republic of China and the United States. Development of the F-CK-1 Ching-kuo Indigenous Defense Fighter (IDF) began in 1984 due to U.S. refusal to sell F-20s and F-16s to the ROCAF as a result of changes in national policy between the U.S. and the People's Republic of China. After a successful maiden flight in 1989, the domestically produced fighter entered service in 1994. However, the ROCAF was subsequently able to obtain F-16s from the United States as well as Mirage 2000-5 fighters from France, resulting in delays to later IDF development that had been anticipated.

In response to American refusals to supply "smart bombs", Taiwan is developing their own equivalent of the Joint Direct Attack Munition for attacks against the PRC mainland in case of invasion preparations.

Taiwan is looking to replace its current fleet of AT-3 jet trainers and F-5 LIFT planes with 66 advanced trainers. In 2008 the Republic of China Air Force released a request for information (RFI) and two companies including Lockheed Martin for the T-50 and Alenia Aermacchi's M-346 responded to the request. These planes were expected to be license produced in Taiwan with a local partner firm, and the overall estimated contract value was 69 billion New Taiwan dollars (US$2.2 billion). However, after the election of President Tsai Ing-wen, who intends to make Taiwan's defense industry a cornerstone for future development, it was decided to domestically design and build 66 AIDC T-5 Brave Eagle supersonic trainers instead of selecting the T-50 or M-346. The T-5, with a program cost of NT$68.6 billion, will be a new aircraft whose design will draw upon Taiwan's expertise gained by building the domestically produced Indigenous Defense Fighter.

In 2019 the Taiwan Air Force's Air Defense and Missile Command announced a five-year, NT$80b (US$2.54b) project to build up a full force of anti-radiation UAVs made by NCSIST.

In 2021 April 15 NCSIST stated that its development of a next-generation fighter was progressing ahead of schedule and that the overall design and engine production would be completed by 2024.

=== Foreign procurement ===
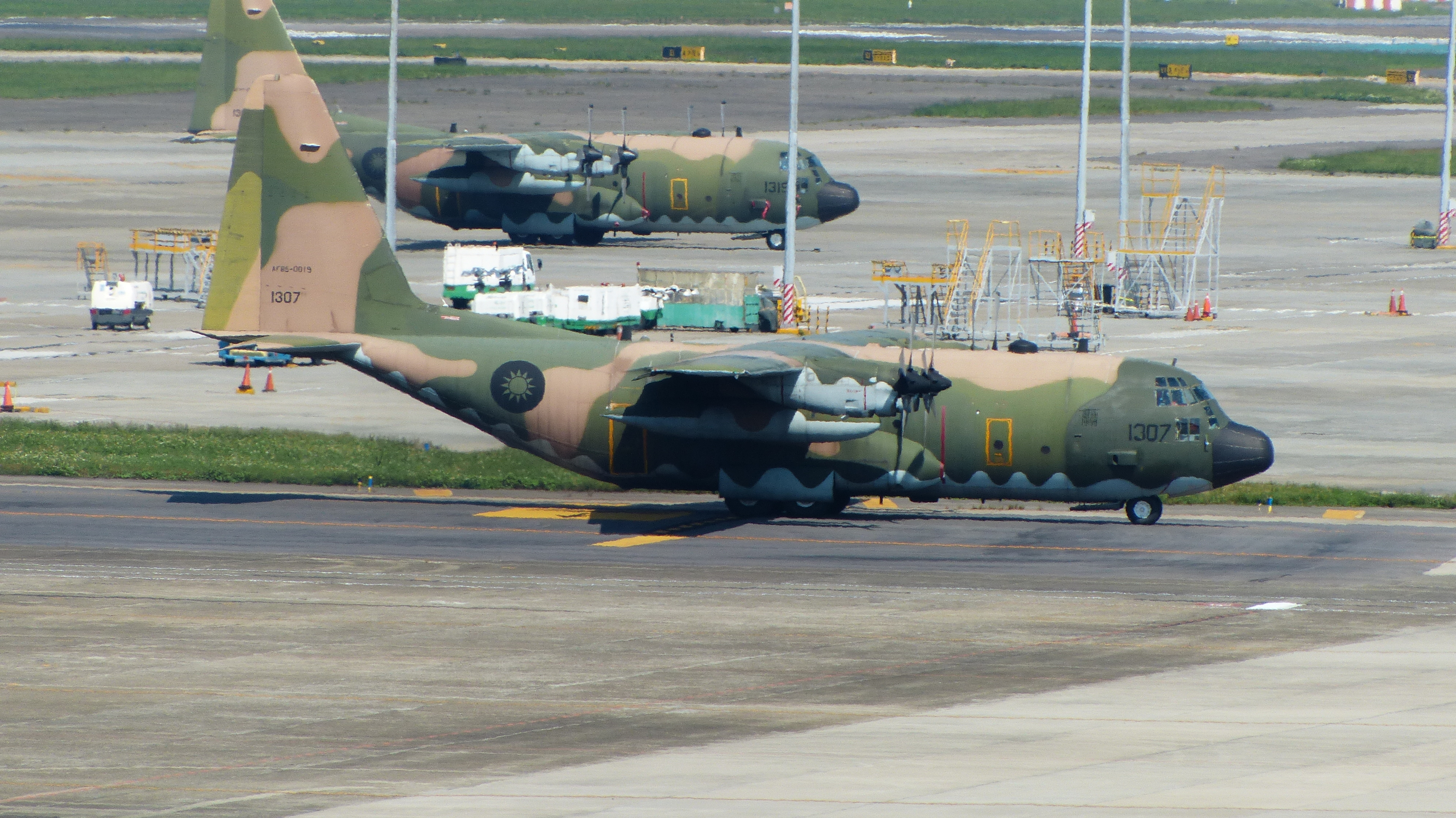
A C-130H taxiing at Songshan Air Base

One of the first modern jets purchased was the Northrop F-5. In 1974 a total of 308 were purchased but, lacking spare parts, the ROC has been forced to salvage them from inoperable F-5s. Taiwan is considering reusing engines from inoperable F-5s in cruise missiles.

The Aerospace Industrial Development Corporation (AIDC), previously known as Aero Industry Development Center, was founded in 1969 under the authority of the Republic of China Air Force to locally produce spares and military aircraft. It was transferred to Chung-Shan Institute of Science and Technology (CSIST) in 1983. By 1973 AIDC had built 242 F-5Es and 66 F-5Fs under license.

In 1992 Taiwan purchased 150 F-16A/B fighter jets from the United States. In the same year, 60 Dassault Mirage 2000–5s were ordered. Forty-eight would be single-seat Mirage 2000-5EI interceptors and 12 would be Mirage 2000-5DI trainers. The version of Mirage 2000-EI5 has the mid-air refuel capability and ground attack ability deleted.

On 28 February 2007, the US Defense Department approved an order made by the ROC for 218 AIM-120C-7 AMRAAM missiles, as well as 235 AGM-65G2 Maverick missiles, associated launchers and other equipment. The total value of this order was revealed to be US$421 million.

In June 2007, the Legislative Yuan also approved the upgrade of the existing Patriot PAC-2 batteries to PAC-3 standard, and, in November, the Pentagon notified the U.S. Congress of the Patriot upgrade order. On 10 August 2007, a shipment of Harpoon anti-ship missiles, valued at an estimated $125 million, was also authorised by the U.S. Defense Department, including 60 AGM-84L Block II missiles and 50 upgrade kits to bring the ROCAF's existing Harpoons up to Block II, Mark L standard.

On 3 October 2008, arms notifications were sent to Congress concerning, amongst other things, the sale of 330 PAC-3 missiles, four missile batteries, radar sets, ground stations and other equipment valued up to US$3.1 billion, the upgrade of four E-2T aircraft to the Hawkeye 2000 standard and US$334 million worth of spare parts for the ROCAF's F-16s, IDFs, F-5E/Fs and C-130s.

Late in January 2010, ROCAF received the first batch of new Sky Sword II BVR missiles ordered from CSIST, believed to have new radar seeker and improved performance from the original version which entered service over 10 years previously. The U.S. government also announced five notifications to Congress for additional arms sales totaling some US$6.39 Billion, under which the ROCAF will receive three PAC-3 batteries with 26 launchers and 114 PAC-3 missiles. On 3 February 2010, ROCAF also announced at a Singapore Airshow that it had signed a new contract for three EC-225 SAR (Search-And-Rescue) helicopters that was awarded to Eurocopter back in December 2009 for US$111 million, along with options for 17 more EC-225s. On 26 November 2011, the three EC-225 C-SAR helicopters were loaded on board an An-124 cargo aircraft and delivered to Chai-yi AB in Taiwan, and should enter service on 1 July 2012.

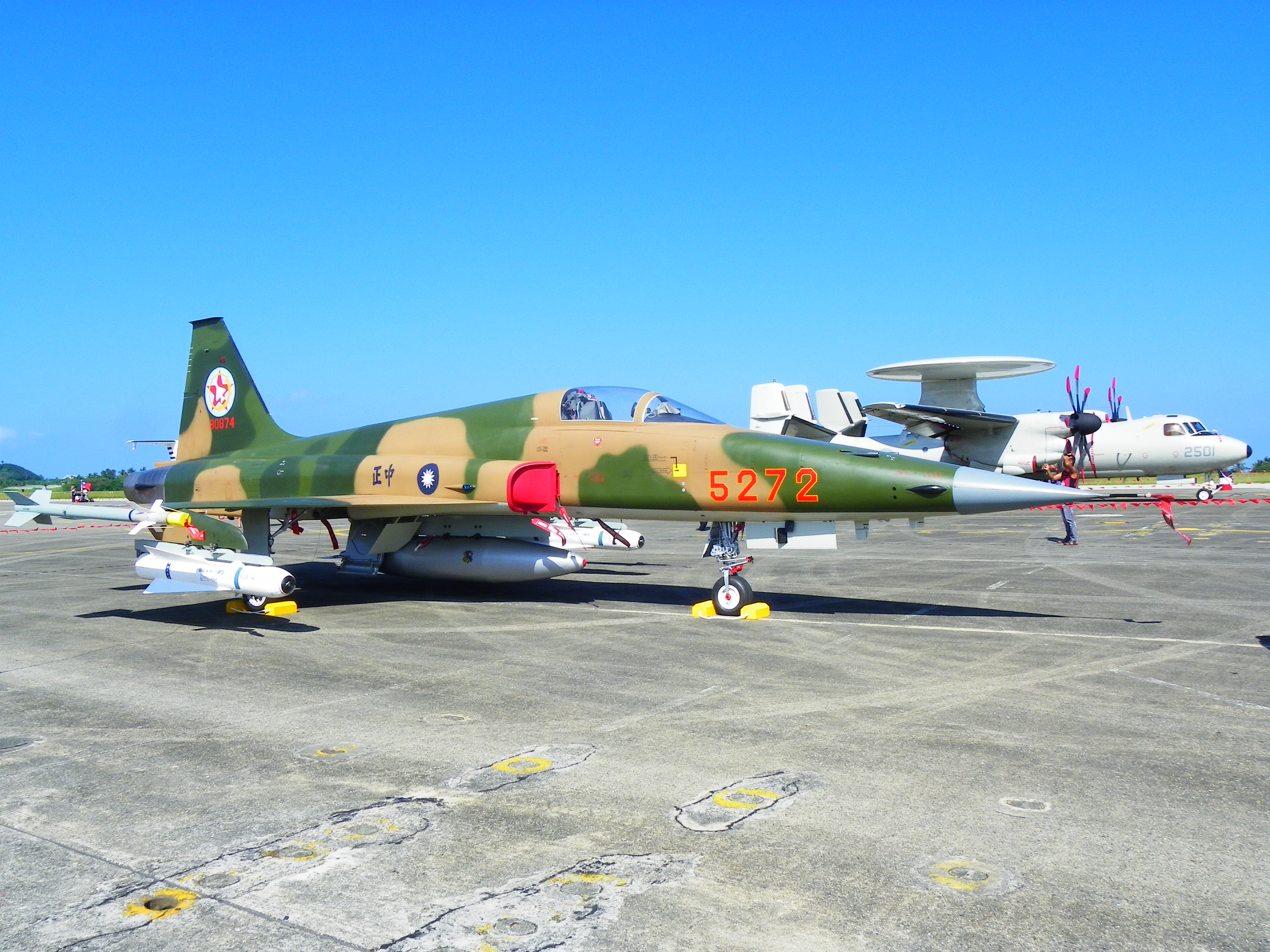
An F-5E from the 46th Fighter aggressor squadron.

On 31 August 2010, it was announced for next year's defense budget, ROCAF's "Medium Transport aircraft" plan to replace 12 B-1900 VIP/transport training aircraft, believed to be 6–8+ Lockheed C-27J, has been put on hold and might be axed, due to lack of budget, but will allocate 20+ million US dollars over next four years for quick runway repair. Other items mentioned including increases in runways from 3 to 6 at Eastern Taiwan's three airbases, moving two I-HAWK batteries to Eastern Taiwan to protect those airbases, which will double to four batteries, and others. On 8 November 2011, a second pair of E-2T Hawkeye AEW (s/n 2501 and 2502) were loaded on a ship and sent to the US for upgrade to the E-2C 2000 standard. The first pair of E-2T (s/n 2503 and 2504) were sent to the US in June 2010 and returned to Taiwan on 18 December 2011, and will be return to service by end of the year.

On 15 August 2011, the United States again deferred the ROCAF request to purchase 66 new F-16C/Ds but offered an upgrade for ROCAF's older F-16A/Bs to F-16V standard, including AN/APG-83 Scalable Agile Beam AESA radars. Due to the discovery of rust near the end of 2018, the delivery of the first four upgraded F-16A/Bs was expected to be delayed until Spring of 2019. The upgrades were still expected to be completed by 2023, despite this initial delay.

In November 2011, the United States-China Economic and Security Review Commission recommended that new fighters be sold to the ROCAF. Taiwan baulked at the cost of the radar upgrade, not wanting to be the lead customer paying to develop the V-standard upgrade, and felt it would be unable to afford both the upgrade and new fighters should those be offered. In response to a vote in the US House of Representatives to force sale of C/D models, the ROC MND said that the V-standard upgrade package offered superior capabilities over the C/D model aircraft. Some defense officials said that in light of the PRC's increasing capabilities, only F-35s would be sufficient to defend Taiwan. A Pentagon report corroborated that claim, asserting that the PRC would probably seek to destroy ROCAF airfields in the first stages of any attack, making a STOVL fighter such as the F-35B vital for effective defense.

In July 2012, Taiwan's Aerospace Industrial Development Corp. and Lockheed Martin announced plans to establish a maintenance and overhaul center to upgrade and maintain the F-16s in place without having to ship them back to the United States. In 2012 a letter of acceptance was agreed on for a US$3.8 billion deal that included the radars, electronic warfare, structural improvements and new weapons. The Air Force received the first upgraded F-16V in 2018.

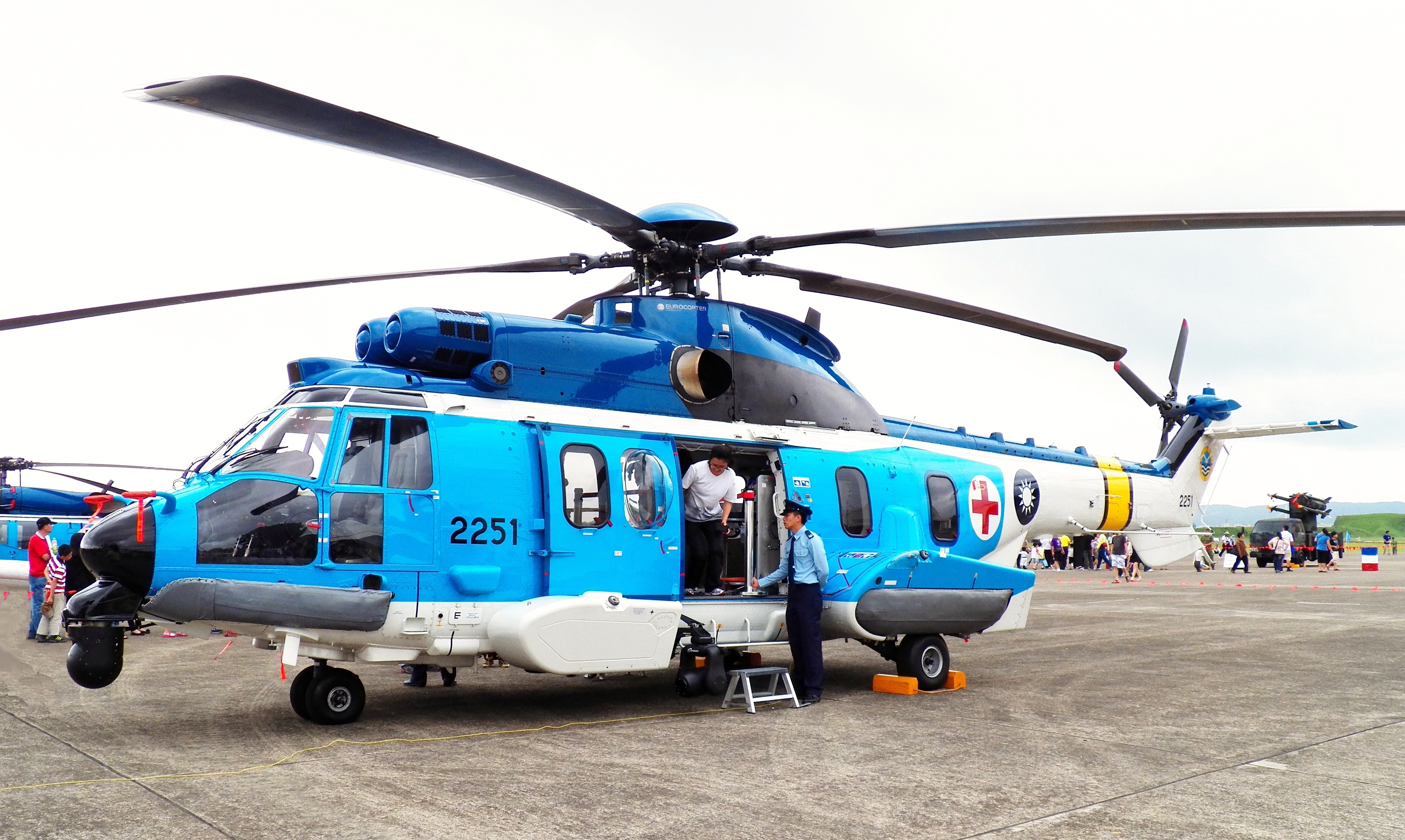
A EC225 on display at the Hsinchu Air Base open house

On 10 April 2019, Air Force Chief of Staff Liu Jen-yuan stated that the Air Force is asking for a total of 66 new-build F-16Vs from the U.S. to replace its aging and obsolete F-5 fighters. On 20 August 2019, the sale of F-16Vs was approved by the State Department and submitted to Congress for approval. The 66 F-16s will be supplied with 75 General Electric F110 engines and 75 AN/APG-83. They will also have new mission computers, datalinks, electronic warfare systems, and compatibility with the Joint Helmet Mounted Cueing System II which Taiwan will equip part of its new F-16s with. The final signing of the Letter of Offer and Acceptance (LOA) for the purchase of 66 F-16V fighter jets was confirmed on 21 December 2019.

To arm the modernized F-16 fleet, the ROCAF has ordered stocks of AIM-120C8, AIM-9X Block II, AGM-88F HCSM, AGM-84H SLAM-ER, and AGM-154C Block III JSOWs. The AIM-120C8 and AIM-9X Block II missiles will enhance the air-to-air capabilities of the F-16s. The AIM-120C8s in particular will help narrow the gap with the PLAAF's increasing dominance in BVR combat with its longer range PL-15 missiles. The AGM-88F will give the ROCAF a badly needed capability to suppress PLA surface-to-air missile batteries along the Chinese coastline. The longer ranged systems already in service with the PLA can deny the airspace over the Taiwan Strait to conventional fourth-generation fighters, including Taiwan's F-16s. The AGM-84H adds an impressed stand-off precision strike capability. Using the missile's GPS/INS navigational waypoints, imaging infrared seeker's telemetry, and two-way datalink, it boasts the ability to be redirected in flight, including against targets moving at highway speeds. It can automatically recognize targets and has the highest precision of precision guided munition in the U.S. Navy inventory. The JSOW glide bomb provides a cheap means of delivery precision guided munitions against targets at long range using both GPS/INS and an imaging infrared seeker for terminal guidance. The Block III (C-1) variant ordered has the added ability to target moving maritime targets, giving the ROCAF another method for interdicting PLAN ships, using glide bombs with a smaller radar and infrared cross section than larger, powered anti-ship missiles.

=== Hardened bases and survivability ===
Taiwan faces the threat of Chinese missile strike on its airfields. PLA's accurate ballistic missiles and cruise missiles can damage or destroy airfields and aircraft on the ground. Taiwan has hardened key Air Force facilities and built redundancies into critical infrastructure so that it can absorb and survive a long-range missile precision attack.

Taiwan Air Force built at least 400 protected revetments in its 9 bases, approximately half of them covered. Underground hangars were built at Chiashan Air Force Base in Hualien that reportedly can protect over half of Taiwan's tactical fighter aircraft. Other underground shelters exist at Chihhang Air Base and perhaps elsewhere. But missiles can target the runways with warheads designed to crater them and so prevent Taiwan's aircraft from taking off.

Taiwan regularly practices dispersing its aircraft from the more vulnerable West coast bases to the East coast. Units are also moved between bases to make it more difficult to know where they might be at any given time. Dummy aircraft are parked on bases and inside shelters to confuse Chinese intelligence. Besides this Taiwan maintains emergency highway strips where planes can land, refuel, rearm and take off in the event that bases are out of service. Each Taiwanese airbase has an engineering unit attached for rapidly repairing runways.

Taiwan is working to provide additional layers of defenses around military airfields against cruise missiles, antiradiation missiles and small drones, as well as potentially larger threats, such as helicopters and low-flying aircraft. Ground version of Sea Oryx SAM and Phalanx CIWS are being developed and deployed to improve air defense.

One of the primary methods of surviving in case of war will be deception and the use of decoy targets. This applies to decoy planes, SAM launchers, radars, etc. Decoys makes use of Taiwan's geographic advantages, especially its mountainous and urban terrain which complicate enemy targeting and kill chain completion.

=== Accidents and incidents ===
Date	Unit	Crew	Aircraft	Comments
25 March 1960	34 Squadron	14	RB-69A	Crashed near Kunsan Air Base, South Korea
6 November 1961	34 Squadron	14	RB-69A	Downed by PLA ground fire over the Liaodong peninsula
8 January 1962	34 Squadron	14	RB-69A	Crashed near the Korea Bay
19 June 1963	34 Squadron	14	RB-69A	Downed by a PLAAF MiG-17PF over Linchuan, Jiangxi
11 June 1964	34 Squadron	13	RB-69A	Downed by a People's Liberation Army Naval Air Force MiG-15 over the Shandong peninsula
8 September 1967	35 Squadron	1	U-2	Downed by PLA SAM-2 over Jiaxing
22 August 1967	34 Squadron	5	C-123B	Reported missing over South China Sea
13 January 1967	8 Squadron	1	F-104G	Failed to return after air-to-air combat with PLA J-6

== Rank and rating insignia ==
Officers

Rank group	General/Flag/Air officers				Senior officers			Junior officers
Republic of China Air Force
Republic of China Air Force	一級上將; Yījí shàngjiàng	二級上將; Èrjí shàngjiàng	中將; Zhōngjiàng	少將; Shàojiàng	上校; Shàngxiào	中校; Zhōngxiào	少校; Shàoxiào	上尉; Shàngwèi	中尉; Zhōngwèi	少尉; Shàowèi

Enlisted

Rank group	Senior NCOs					Junior NCOs		Enlisted
Republic of China Air Force
Republic of China Air Force	一等士官長; Yīděng shìguānzhǎng	二等士官長; Èrděng shìguānzhǎng	三等士官長; Sānděng shìguānzhǎng	上士; Shàngshì	中士; Zhōngshì	下士; Xiàshì	上等兵; Shàngděngbīng	一等兵; Yīděngbīng	二等兵; Èrděngbīng

== ROCAF Squadron emblems ==
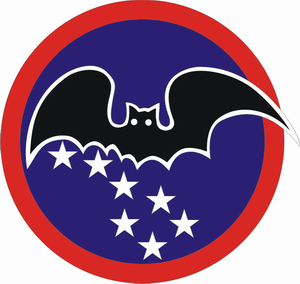
34th Squadron, "Black Bat"

35th Squadron, "Black Cat"

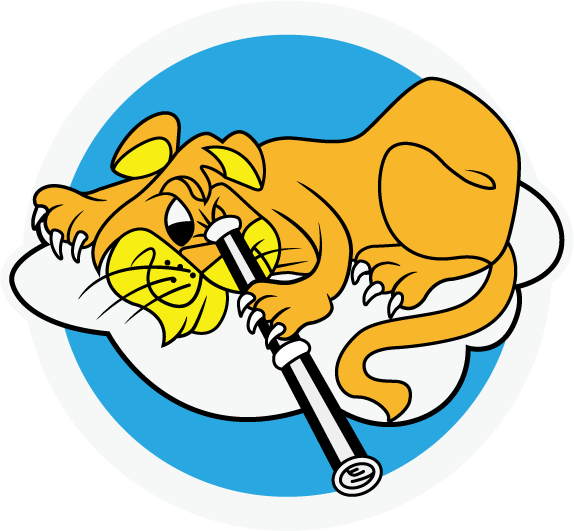
12th Tactical Reconnaissance Squadron, "Leo Gazer"

== See also ==
- Development of the Chinese Nationalist air force (1937–1945)
- Central Aircraft Manufacturing Company, also known as CAMCO
- Flying Tigers
- Black Bat Squadron
- Black Cat Squadron
- Republic of China Air Force Academy
- Republic of China Air Force Museum
- Ministry of National Defense (Republic of China)
- Republic of China Armed Forces
  - Republic of China Army
  - Republic of China Navy
    - Republic of China Marine Corps
  - Republic of China Military Police
- People's Liberation Army Air Force
- Political status of Taiwan
