= List of defunct airlines of Iran =

This is a list of defunct airlines of Iran.

| Airline | Image | IATA | ICAO | Callsign | Commenced operations | Ceased operations | Notes |
|---|---|---|---|---|---|---|---|
| Aban Air | | K5 | ABE | | 2006 | 2007 | |
| Air Taxi company | | | | | 1958? | 1980 | Merged to create Iran Aseman Airlines |
| Air Service | | | | | 1980 | | |
| Aram Air | | | IRW | | 2000 | 2002 | |
| Aria Air Tour | | | IRX | | 1999 | 2001 | |
| Aria Air | | | IRX | ARIA | 2001 | 2014 | |
| Arvand Airlines | | | | | | | |
| Atlas Air | | | | | 2000 | 2001 | |
| Atrak Air | | AK | ATR | ATRAK | 2013 | 2018 | |
| AWA Airways | | | | | 2016 | | did not start |
| Bon Air | | | | | 1997 | 1998 | |
| Bonyad Airlines | | | | | | | |
| Dena Airways | | D9 | DAI | DENA | 2016 | 2021-2022 | Government Airline |
| Eagle Air | | | | | 1948 | 1949 | merged into Iranian Airways |
| Esquith Air | | | | | 1997 | | |
| Eram Air | | YE | IRY | ERAM AIR | 2005 | 2013 | |
| Fly Qeshm | | | | | 2016 | | Joint airline between Iranian and chinese investors, did not launch, operated CRJ 900 |
| Fars Air Qeshm | | QE | QFZ | FARS AIR | 2006 | 2013 | |
| Fars Air Qeshm | | QE | QFZ | FARS AIR | 2017 | 2021 | |
| Faraz Qeshm Airlines | | | | | | | renamed to Qeshm Air |
| Helicopter Company of Iran | | | | | | 1980 | |
| HESA Airlines | | H8 | SPN | | 2011 | 2014 | Rebranded as Sepahan Airlines |
| Hoor Aseman Airlines | | | | | 1980 | | merged into Iran Aseman Airlines |
| Iran Air Joint Stock Company | | | | | 1944 | 1961 | First Incarnation of Iranair |
| Iranair Regional | | | | | 2018 | | never launched |
| Iranian Air Transport | | IRG | IATC | | 1992 | 2009 | Rebranded as Naft Airlines |
| Iranian Airlines | | | | | 2010 | 2010 | Formed by Saha Airlines. Project cancelled July 2010. |
| Iran National Airlines | | IR | | | 1962 | 1973 | Renamed/merged to Iran Air |
| Iranian Airways | | | | | 1944 | 1961 | Renamed/merged to United Iranian Airlines |
| Iranian Post & Telecom Aviation Services | | | | | 1990 | 1997 | |
| Iranian State Airlines | | | | | 1938 | 1946 | State owned, replaced by Iranian Airways which later became Iran Air |
| Jam Air | | | | | 2018 | 2018 | Never Launched |
| Junkers Airline Company in Iran | | | | | 1927 | 1932 | First Commercial Iranian Airline, owned by Junkers |
| Mohann Air | | | | | 2001 | | |
| Naft Airlines | | NV | IRG | | 2009 | 2017 | Renamed/merged to Karun Airlines |
| National Iranian Oil Co. (NIOC) Airlines | | | | | 1960s | ???? | |
| North Star Maritime | | | | | 1977 | | |
| Pariz Air | | | IRE | | 1997 | 2001 | |
| Pardis Air | | | | | 2020 | 2024? | AOC suspended |
| Pars Air | | | PRA | | 2006 | 2008 | |
| Pars Air Company | | | | | 1970 | 1980 | merged into Iran Aseman Airlines |
| Pasargad Airlines | | | | | 2013 | ???? | Cancelled |
| Persian Air Services | | | PAS | | 1954 | 1962 | Merged with Iran Air |
| Qeshm Air | | | | | 2000 | 2006 | renamed to Pars Air |
| Sabalan Airlines | | | | | 2012 | 2020s | failed |
| Saffatt Airlines | | | IRV | | 1998 | 2017 | |
| Safiran Airlines | | | SFN | SAFIRAN | 1988 | 2007 | |
| South Air Services | | | | | 1963 | 1992 | rebranded as Iranian Air Transport Company |
| TA Air | | | | | 2004 | 2005 | |
| Tara Airlines | | | | | 1994 | 1995 | renamed to Tara Helicopter Company |
| Tehran Airlines | | | THR | | 2016 | 2020 | never commenced |
| United Iranian Airlines | | | | | 1961 | 1962 | Renamed/merged to Iran National Airlines |
| Yas Air | | | MHD | | 2008 | 2014 | |

== See also ==
- List of airlines of Iran
- List of airports in Iran
