= List of accidents and incidents involving the Avro York =

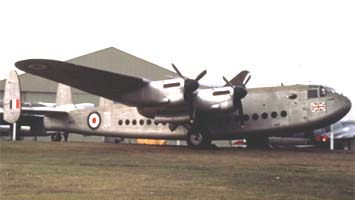
A Royal Air Force Avro York

The Avro York was a British transport aircraft, derived from the Second World War Lancaster bomber and used in both military and civil roles.

== 1940s ==
- 26 July 1944: A Royal Air Force (RAF) York crashed after overshooting at Gibraltar.
- 14 November 1944: An RAF York crashed near Grenoble, France.
- 1 February 1945: An RAF York crashed off Lampedusa Island.
- 8 February 1945: An RAF York was damaged beyond repair during a landing accident at Mauripur, India.
- 3 November 1945: RAF York C.1 MW120 slid off the runway following landing gear failure while landing at Ratmalana Airport, Ceylon (now Sri Lanka). There were no casualties, but the aircraft was written off.
- 29 December 1945: RAF York C.1 MW134 crashed into Beehive Hill at Bashley due to a loss of control while attempting a three-engined overshoot at RAF Holmsley South, killing one.
- 11 April 1946: RAF York C.1 MW180 crashed on landing at RAF Lyneham after the landing gear collapsed; there were no casualties, but the aircraft was written off.
- 11 April 1946: RAF York C.1 MW252 crashed at RAF Woodbridge after overshooting the runway following a heavy landing, one of the six crew on board was killed.
- 28 April 1946: RAF York C.1 MW256 crashed short of the runway on landing at RAF Valley; one of the main landing gear separated after the aircraft struck a sand dune.
- 23 May 1946: RAF York C.1 MW191 landed hard at RAF Mauripur, causing an undercarriage leg to collapse; the aircraft ground-looped as a result.
- On 7 September 1946: British South American Airways York 1 (G-AHEW, Star Leader) took off from Yundum Airport near of Bathurst (now Banjul), the Gambia. The captain lost control of the aircraft as it was climbing. The accident killed all 24 passengers and crew on board. The cause of the loss of control was not determined, but mishandling of the controls by the pilot was a possibility.
- 9 September 1946: RAF York C.1 MW184 struck a pony while landing at night at RAF Holmesley South.
- 6 October 1946: RAF York C.1 MW125 crashed in the Bay of Bengal 100 mi west of Penang, Malaysia, killing all 21 on board.
- 20 October 1946: An RAF York crashed on take off from Dum Dum, Calcutta, India.
- 3 November 1946: An RAF York was damaged beyond repair on landing at Delhi-Palam, India.
- 20 November 1946: An RAF York crashed in the desert south of Helwan, Egypt.
- 28 November 1946: An RAF York crashed on take off from RAF Brize Norton.
- 2 December 1946: An RAF York crashed short of the runway at RAF Luqa, Malta.
- 19 December 1946: An RAF York was destroyed by fire during maintenance at RAF Honington.
- 23 December 1946: A Flota Aérea Mercante Argentina York crashed into a mountain 31 km from Rio de Janeiro, Brazil. All 21 on board died, including aviator Dorothy Spicer.
- 11 February 1947: An RAF York crashed on landing at RAF Waterbeach.
- 14 March 1947: An RAF York crashed on landing at RAF Lyneham.
- 18 March 1947: An RAF York crashed and burnt out near Negombo Town after departure from Negombo, Ceylon.
- 13 April 1947: British South American Airways York Star Speed crashed on landing at Dakar, Senegal.
- 24 May 1947: An RAF York crashed on landing at Luqa, Malta.
- 11 June 1947: An RAF York crashed on landing at RAF Oakington.
- 1 July 1947: An RAF York crashed after overshooting at RAF Oakington.
- 16 July 1947: A BOAC York crashed near Basra, Iraq.
- 25 July 1947: A Flota Aérea Mercante Argentina Avro 685 York I crashed at Moron Air Base, Buenos Aires, Argentina, after hitting a lorry shortly after landing.
- 25 July 1947: A Skyways York was damaged beyond repair on landing at London Heathrow Airport.
- 2 September 1947: An RAF York crashed and was destroyed by fire on landing at RAF Dishforth.
- 4 September 1947: An RAF York was destroyed by a hangar fire at Habbinya, Iraq.
- 30 October 1947: An RAF York was damaged beyond repair in a taxying accident at Negombo, Ceylon.
- 5 November 1947: An RAF York crashed on landing at RAF Lyneham.
- 16 November 1947: An RAF York crashed on landing at RAF Santa Cruz, Bombay, India.
- 17 November 1947: An RAF York crashed while overshooting at RAF Dishforth, Yorkshire.
- 16 February 1948: An RAF York was damaged beyond repair during a landing at RAF Hullavington.
- 4 July 1948: An RAF collided with a Scandinavian Airlines System DC-6 over Northwood, London, killing all seven passengers and crew on the Avro York and 31 passengers and crew on the DC-6. See 1948 Northwood mid-air collision.
- 27 July 1948: An RAF York crashed on landing at RAF Abingdon.
- 11 August 1948: An RAF York crashed on landing at Desford in Leicestershire.
- 19 September 1948: An RAF York crashed on take off from Wunstorf, West Germany.
- 23 September 1948: An RAF York crashed on take off from Wunstorf, West Germany
- 10 October 1948: An RAF York crashed on landing at Gatow, West Berlin.
- 10 November 1948: An RAF York crashed on take off from Wunstorf, West Germany.
- 2 December 1948: An RAF York crashed on landing at Gatow, West Berlin.
- 14 December 1948: Two RAF Yorks crashed, one on take-off and one landing at RAF Gatow, West Berlin.
- 16 December 1948: An RAF York crashed on landing at RAF Abingdon, Oxfordshire.
- 5 January 1949: British South American Airways York Star Venture crashed at Caravellos Bay, Brazil.
- 1 February 1949: An RAF York crashed after take off at Castel Benito, Libya.
- 15 March 1949: A Skyways York crashed on approach to Gatow, West Germany.
- 21 April 1949: An RAF York was damaged beyond repair during a landing at RAF Gutersloh, West Germany.
- 19 June 1949: A Skyways York crashed at Neustadt near Wundstorf, British Zone of Germany.
- 30 July 1949: An RAF York crashed on take off from Wunstorf in the British Zone of Germany.
- 15 November 1949: An RAF York crashed while landing at Nairobi West instead of Eastleigh in Kenya.

== 1950s ==
- 2 June 1950: RAF York C.1 MW164 burned out during refueling at RAF Bassingbourn.
- 25 October 1950: RAF York C.1 MW102 was written off after it crashed on landing at RAF Changi.
- 11 March 1952: An Air Charter York 1 (G-AMGL) was being ferried to Hamburg when it force-landed near Fuhlsbüttel Airport after all four engines failed due to fuel exhaustion; all 10 on board survived, but the aircraft was written off.
- 24 August 1952: An Eagle Aviation York C.1 (G-AGNZ) force-landed near Potsdam due to an engine fire while attempting to land at RAF Gatow following engine problems, killing one of three crew.
- 27 November 1952: A Surrey Flying Service York 1 (G-AMGM) was on a positioning flight from London to Lyneham when it entered a steep descent short of the runway; it then struck treetops and crashed on a ridge near RAF Lyneham. Cause attributed to pilot error and weather (downdraft).
- 2 February 1953: A Skyways York 1 (G-AHFA) disappeared off Newfoundland with 39 on board.
- 13 April 1954: A Scottish Airlines York C.1 (G-AMUM) overran the runway during takeoff at Luqa Airport. The starter motor on one of the engines failed; the pilot attempted to start the engine by taxiing at high speed. Although the engine started, it was too late as the pilot failed to throttle back and apply the brakes in time.
- 26 June 1954: A Skyways York C.1 (G-AGNY) crashed at Kyritz while descending for Berlin after a loss of control following engine separation, killing the three crew; the cause was not determined.
- 22 September 1954: A Scottish Airlines York C.1 (G-ANRC) crashed on takeoff from Stansted Airport; during a crosswind takeoff the aircraft swung to the left, however the pilot overcompensated and the aircraft swung to the right. Takeoff was aborted, but the left gear collapsed and the aircraft left the runway. The aircraft caught fire and burned out but all 49 on board survived.
- 11 April 1955: An Associated Airways York crashed on takeoff at Yellowknife, Canada.
- 12 April 1955: An Arctic Wings York was damaged beyond repair after hitting a snow bank at Hall Lake, Canada.
- 26 May 1955: An Associated Airways York C.1 (CF-HMY) lost control and crashed on takeoff from Edmonton Municipal Airport after it struck an obstacle due to pilot error in bad weather, killing both pilots.
- 14 September 1955: A Persian Air Services York crashed 40 miles south-east of Basra, Iraq.
- 29 September 1955: An Associated Airways York C.1 (CF-HMV) ditched in the Thoa River near Yellowknife due to fuel exhaustion. Although the aircraft partially sank, both pilots were able to escape and climbed onto a wing flap. The pilot died within two days, the co-pilot was rescued ten days later.
- 24 January 1956: A Maritime Central Airways York was damaged beyond repair during a forced landing at Fort Chimo, Quebec, Canada.
- 18 February 1956: A Scottish Airlines York C.1 crashed near Żurrieq, Malta due to engine failure and subsequent pilot error killing all 50 passengers and crew. See 1956 Scottish Airlines Malta air disaster.
- 30 April 1956: A Scottish Airlines crashed on take off from Stansted Airport, Essex.
- 13 September 1956: A Pacific Western Airlines York was damaged beyond repair after an accident at Cape Perry, North West Territories, Canada.
- 13 September 1956: A Transair (Canada) York was damaged beyond repair after overrunning runway at Fox, Northwest Territories, Canada.
- 17 September 1956: A Persian Air Services York was destroyed when a fuel tank exploded during maintenance at Stansted Airport, Essex, England.
- 26 September 1956: A Maritime Central Airways York was damaged beyond repair in a forced landing in Quebec, Canada.
- 8 January 1957: A Transair (Canada) York was destroyed by fire after crash landing on a lake in Hudson Bay, Canada.
- 23 December 1957: A Scottish Airlines cargo York crashed near London Stansted Airport on approach to the airport, killing all four crew.
- 20 May 1958: A Dan-Air York was damaged beyond repair while landing at Luqa, Malta.
- 25 May 1958: A Dan-Air York crashed at Guragon, Punjab, India.
- 29 September 1958: A Middle East Airlines York went missing over the Mediterranean Sea somewhere between Beirut and Rome.
- 15 July 1959: A Persian Air Services York crashed near Kuwait City, Kuwait.

== 1960s ==
- 27 May 1960: A Trans Mediterranean Airways York was damaged beyond repair on take off from Mehrabhad Airport, Tehran, Iran.
- 24 May 1961: A Trans Mediterranean Airways York crashed during an emergency landing at Azaiba, Muscat.
- 6 April 1962: A Trans Mediterranean Airways aircraft on lease to Kuwait Airways was damaged beyond repair in a landing accident at Lahore, Pakistan
- 11 September 1962: A Trans Mediterranean Airways York crash-landed in Saudi Arabia.
- 15 March 1963: A Trans Mediterranean Airways York crashed seven miles southeast of Karai, Iran.
