= Persian Air Services =

Iranian airline (1954–1961)

Perisan Air Services
IATA	ICAO	Call sign
-	-	-
- Founded: 1954
- Ceased operations: February 24, 1961 (merged to form Iranair
- Destinations: 12+ across history
- Key people: Ahmed Shafiq

Persian Air Services was an Iranian airline that merged to form Iranair.

== History ==
The airline was founded in 1954 by Ahmed Shafiq, who was the son of the Shah's late sister. The airline was one of two Iranian airlines during the 1950s along with Iranair.

Persian Air Services would begin to operate cargo flights from Tehran to Geneva using a fleet of Avro York aircraft. The airline had flights operated for the Lebanese Trans Mediterranean Airways. The airline did this with a Douglas DC-7 leased from the Belgian flag carrier, Sabena. The airline would fly from Tehran to the cities of Geneva, Paris, Brussels, and London.

Persian Air Services would pick blue, grey, and black as the colours of the airline and signed another contract with the British airline Skyways. The airline made PAS its trading name.

In 1960 after initially only operating freight services the airline began passenger operations on flights to Europe.

== Merger and subsequent successors ==
On February 24, 1961, Persian Air Services merged with Iranian Airways. These two would later form United Iranian Airlines, which later became Iran National Airlines, which then became Iranair. Iranair in 1980 became Islamic Republic of Iran Airlines, though it is still known as Iranair.

== Fleet ==
- Douglas DC-7
- Lockheed L-188 Electra
- Douglas DC-4
- Douglas DC-6
- Avro York
- Boeing 707

== Destinations ==
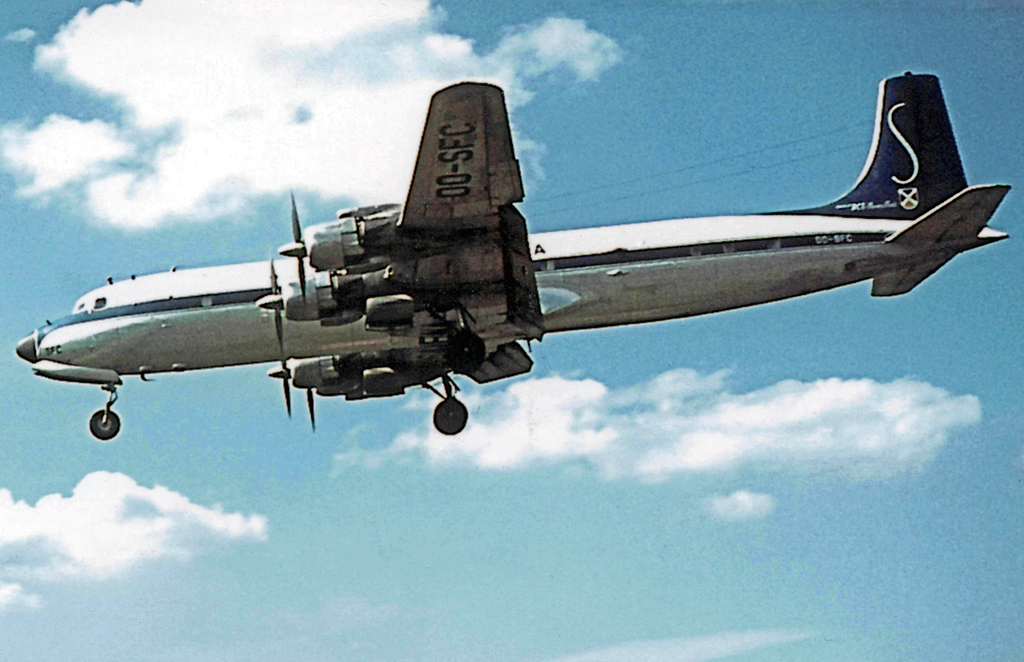
A Douglas DC 7 of Sabena

=== Belgium ===
- Brussels

=== France ===
- Paris

=== Egypt ===
- Cairo

=== Greece ===
- Athens

=== Iran ===
- Abadan
- Shiraz
- Tehran

=== Iraq ===
- Baghdad

=== Kuwait ===
- Kuwait City

=== Lebanon ===
- Beirut

=== Qatar ===
- Doha

=== Saudi Arabia ===
- Dhahran

=== Switzerland ===
- Basel
- Geneva

== See also ==
- List of defunct airlines of Iran
- Iran Air Joint Stock Company
