= Iran Air Flight 742 =

2011 aviation accident in Iran

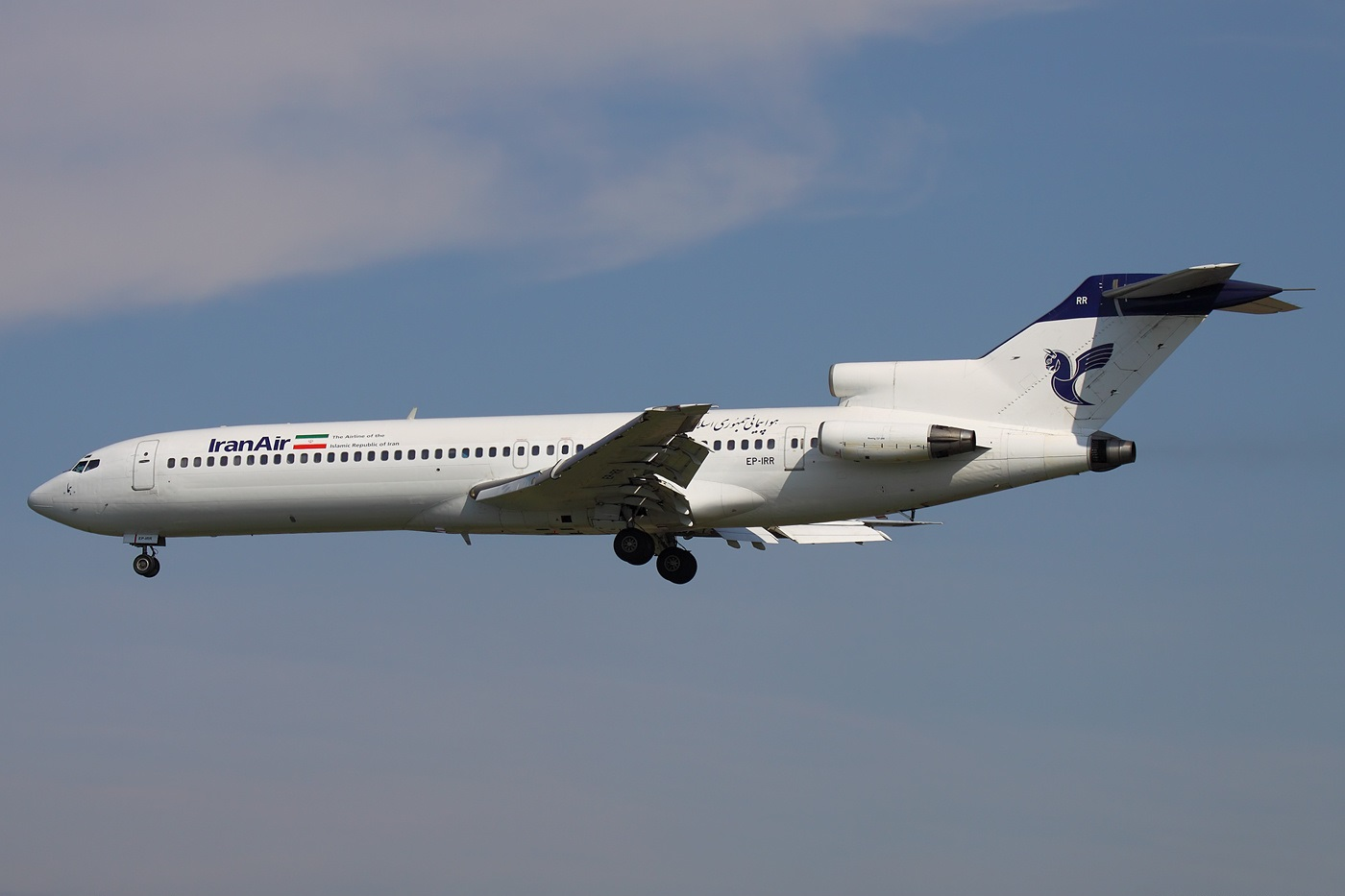
- EP-IRR, the aircraft involved in the accident, seen in 2012

Accident
- Date: 18 October 2011
- Summary: Nose-gear up landing following nose gear failure
- Site: Mehrabad International Airport, Tehran, Iran

Aircraft
- Aircraft type: Boeing 727-200
- Operator: Iran Air
- IATA flight No.: IR742
- ICAO flight No.: IRA742
- Call sign: IRANAIR 742
- Registration: EP-IRR
- Flight origin: Sheremetyevo International Airport, Moscow, Russia
- Destination: Tehran Imam Khomeini International Airport, Tehran, Iran
- Occupants: 113
- Passengers: 94
- Crew: 19
- Fatalities: 0
- Survivors: 113

Iran Air Flight 742 was a Boeing 727 passenger jet on a scheduled service from Moscow, Russia, to Tehran, Iran, which on 18 October 2011 made an emergency landing at Tehran's Mehrabad International Airport, after the nose landing gear failed to deploy. All 113 occupants on board survived without accident.

== Accident ==
External videos
- Footage of the landing on YouTube

Arriving from Moscow's Sheremetyevo International Airport with 94 passengers and 19 crew, at 15:20 local time flight 742 was approaching Tehran Imam Khomeini International Airport, when the crew received a "not down and locked" indication for the nose gear and aborted the approach.

Following an unsuccessful attempt at troubleshooting, the crew, led by captain Hushang Shahbazi (Note: Persian: هوشنگ شهبازی), decided to divert to Mehrabad where a low approach confirmed the nose gear was not extended. The crew subsequently landed the aircraft without the nose gear on runway 29L at about 16:00 local time and came to a stand still on both main gear and the nose of the aircraft. The aircraft was evacuated. No injuries occurred.

== Aftermath ==
Although initially subjected to a ban from flying while the incident was investigated, Captain Shahbazi was acclaimed as a national hero, and received more than 11,000 emails from people in Iran and overseas. He was subsequently forced into early retirement due to his alleged portrayal of Iranian airlines as being unsafe as well as his public opposition to US sanctions, which restricted the sale of spare aircraft parts to Iran.

The aircraft was repaired and returned to service with Iran Air. In 2013 it was placed into storage.
