= Sabalan Airlines =

Planned Iranian airline

IATA	ICAO	Call sign
-	-	-
- Founded: 2012
- Operating bases: Ardabil Airport
- Fleet size: 4
- Destinations: 3
- Employees: 77

Sabalan Airlines was a planned Iranian airline. The administrative affairs of the airline have been completed. The airline is based in Ardabil, Ardabil Province and has bought four aircraft. The airline was given government funding in April 2012. It was founded after other airlines opted not to fly to Ardabil due to bad refueling at Ardabil Airport. The airline was reported to begin flights twenty days after launching but as of 2026 it is unknown whether Sabalan Airlines has actually started operations.

== Founding ==
The airline can be traced back to an airline called Tablan Airlines owned by Mansour Haghighatpour. It is unclear what happened to Tablan, but in 2012 a new airline called Sabalan Airlines was founded. The airline announced it would have four aircraft.

The officials in the region also announced that the airport in Ardabil would also be improved to better help the start up of the airline.

== Status ==
In 2022, another airline called Ardabil Airlines was created after Sabalan Airlines reportedly lost interest in the region, as sanctions were a challenge for the start up of Ardabil Airlines.

It was never announced whether Sabalan officially ceased operations or not therefore making the status of the airline unknown.

== Fleet ==
The airline plans to operate a fleet of four aircraft.

== Destinations ==
- Ardabil
- Azhaz
- Mashhad

== See also ==
- List of defunct airlines of Iran
