= Dena Airways =

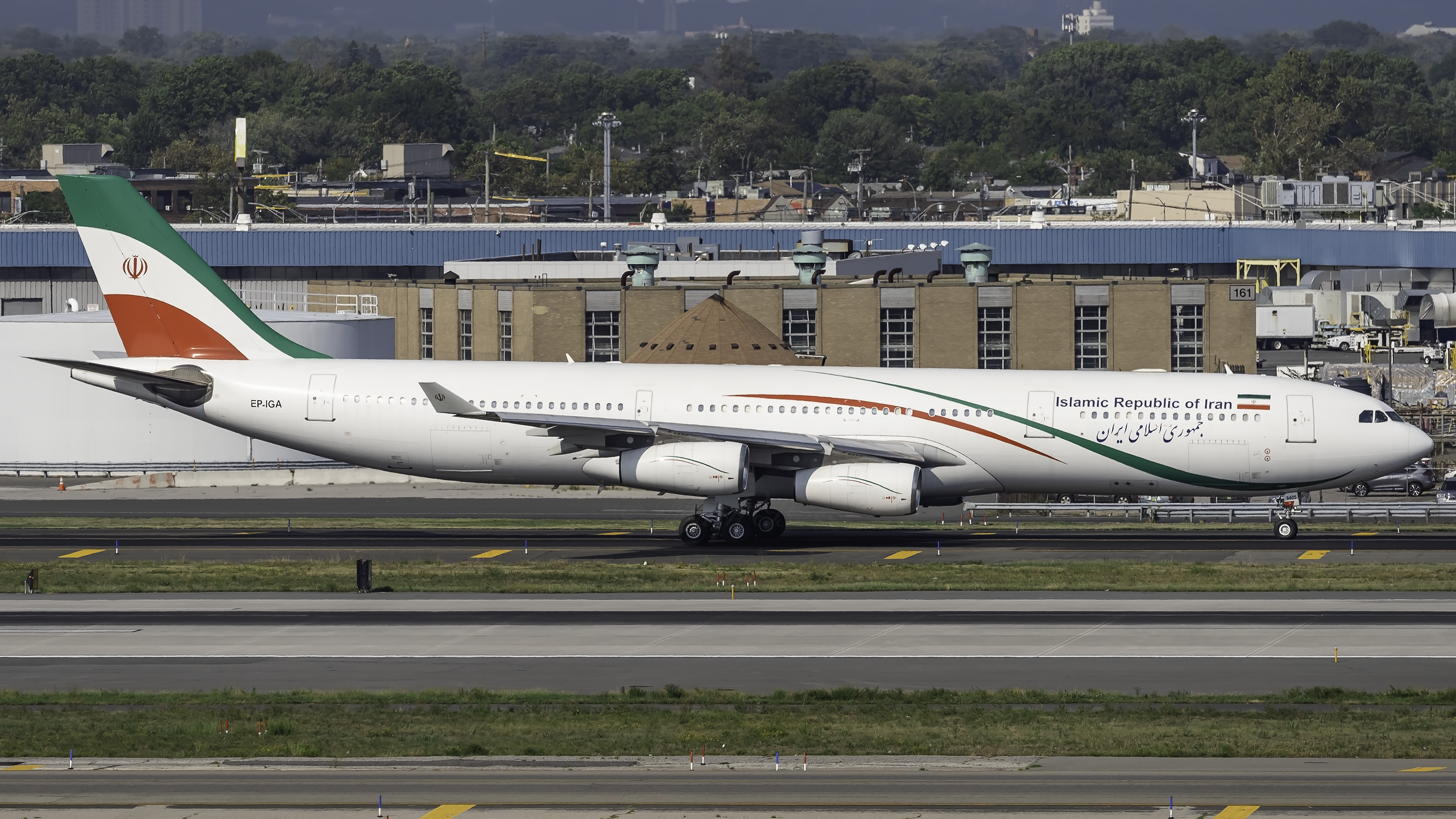
- A340 of Dena Airways
IATA	ICAO	Call sign
D9	DAI	DENA
- Founded: 2016
- Ceased operations: 2021-2022
- Fleet size: 1

Dena Airways was an Iranian airline that operated flights for the government.

== History ==
When Meraj Airlines was sanctioned, officials started up a new airline called Dena Airways. The US government caught on and Dena was added to the sanctions list. The airline was created to operate one plane only which was owned by Hassan Rouhani. In 2021 to 2022 the airline ceased all operations ending its use.

== Fleet ==
The airline was created to operate one aircraft, an Airbus A340 belonging to Hassan Rouhani which was later sanctioned.

== See also ==
- List of defunct airlines of Iran
