= Yas Air =

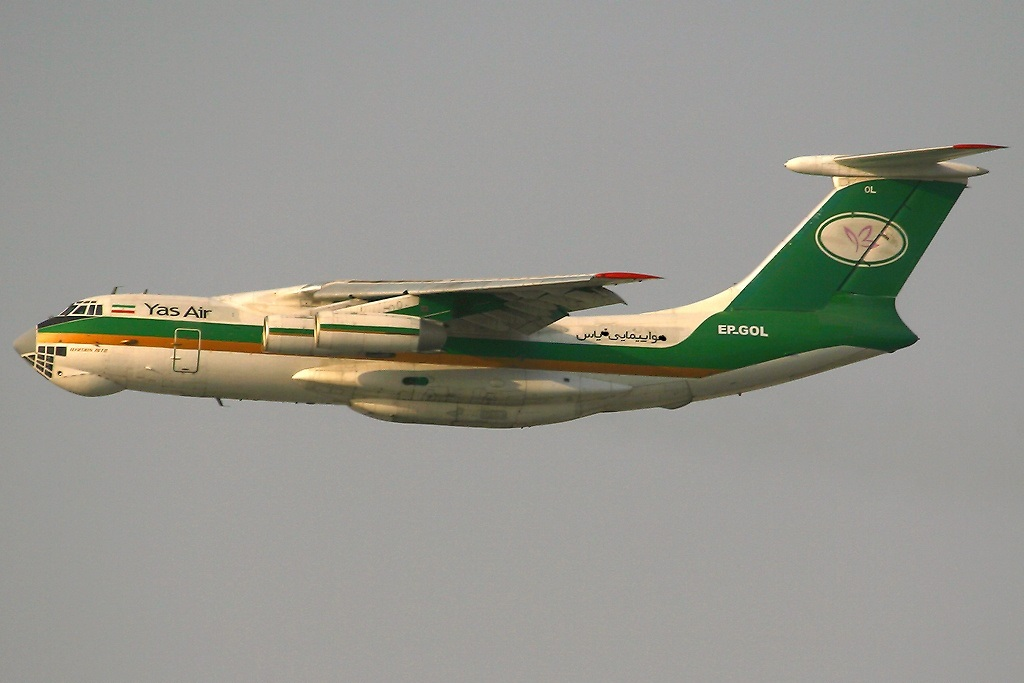
- An Il-76 operated by Yas Air.
IATA	ICAO	Call sign
—	MND	YasAir
- Commenced operations: 2008
- Ceased operations: 2014
- Operating bases: Tehran Mehrabad International Airport
- Fleet size: 2
- Destinations: 2
- Headquarters: Tehran, Iran
- Key people: Mansour Avizheh (Commercial Manager)
- Website: www.yasair.com

Yas Air (Persian: هواپیمایی یاس, Havâpeymâyi-ye Yâs) is an Iranian airline which was a commercial airline but now focuses on cargo only.

== History ==
The airline was founded in 2000 under the name Qeshm Air.

Yas Air was the new name for the airline Pars Air which was an airline that was under sanctions.

The airline commenced operations in 2008, in 2014 export controlled General Electric CF6 engines were brought to Iran via Yas Air. In March 2011, the airline would fly items to the IRGC in Syria.

In 2014 the airline was renamed to Pouya Air.

== Destinations ==
- (Iran) Tehran — Tehran Mehrabad International Airport (Hub/Base)
- (Iran) Mashhad — Mashhad International Airport

== Fleet ==
=== Current ===
- 2 Ilyushin Il-76

=== Past ===
- 1 Antonov An-74 (Cargo)
- 1 Antonov An-74T
- 2 Antonov An-74TK
- 1 Airbus A320-211 (Passenger)

== Accidents and incidents ==
In March 2011, a flight operated by Yas Air heading to Syria when it was intercepted by Turkish Authorities.
