= Fars Air Qeshm =

Iranian cargo airline

Fars Qeshm Air
IATA	ICAO	Call sign
-	QFZ	FARS AIR
- Founded: 2003
- Commenced operations: 2017
- Ceased operations: 2021
- Operating bases: Tehran Imam Khomeini International Airport
- Fleet size: 2
- Destinations: 16
- Headquarters: Tehran, Iran
- Key people: Gholamreza Ghasemi, Chairman
- Website: farsairlines.com

Fars Air Qeshm is an Iranian cargo airline based in Qeshm.

== History ==
Fars Air Qeshm was established in 2003 with the aim of creating efficient passenger and cargo services serving Qeshm Island. The airline was created with the aid of private sector investment. It temporarily ceased operations in 2013 due to bad management and financial problems. Operations were restarted with new management team in March 2017 based in Tehran with two Boeing 747-281F Combi (Passenger / cargo) aircraft.

Multiple intelligence sources has accused Iranian government of using Fars Air Qeshm aircraft and its cargo route to Beirut in order to transport weapons for Hezbollah and cover up as civilian jets.

In autumn 2024 a 747 delivered humanitarian aid that seemed to be weapons to Syria. It flew there four times.

== Destinations ==
As of March 2017, the airline operated cargo flights to the following destinations:

Country	City	Airport	Notes
Armenia	Yerevan	Zvartnots International Airport	
Georgia	Tbilisi	Tbilisi International Airport	
Iran	Tehran	Tehran Imam Khomeini International Airport	Hub
Iraq	Erbil	Erbil International Airport	
Kazakhstan	Almaty	Almaty International Airport	
Kyrgyzstan	Bishkek	Manas International Airport	
Lebanon	Beirut	Beirut–Rafic Hariri International Airport	
Malaysia	Kuala Lumpur	Kuala Lumpur International Airport	
Mongolia	Ulaanbaatar	Buyant-Ukhaa International Airport	
Pakistan	Karachi	Jinnah International Airport	
Qatar	Doha	Hamad International Airport	
Syria	Damascus	Damascus International Airport	
Turkey	Istanbul	Istanbul Sabiha Gökçen International Airport	
United Arab Emirates	Dubai	Al Maktoum International Airport	

== Fleet ==
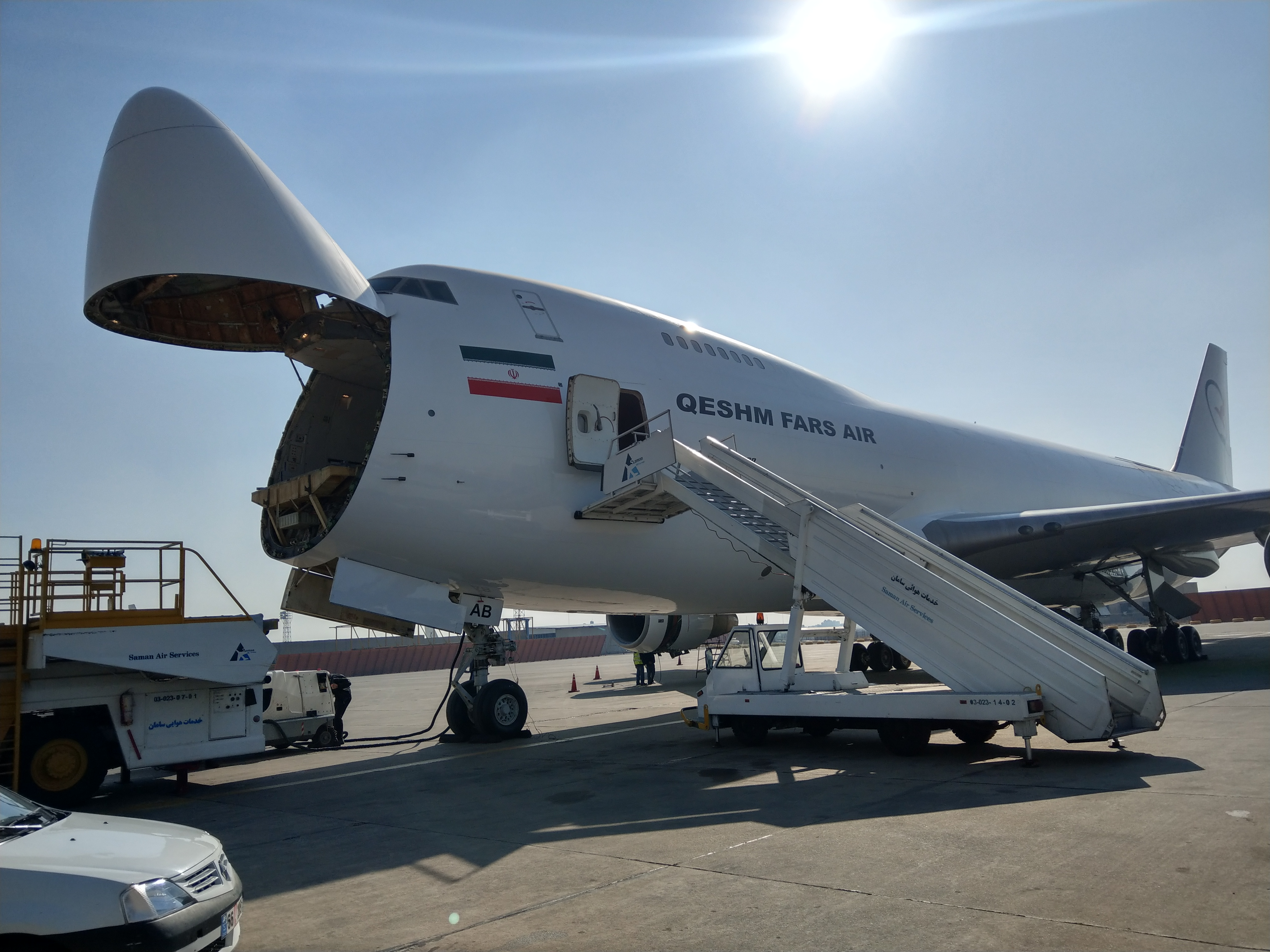
Fars Air Qeshm Boeing 747-200F

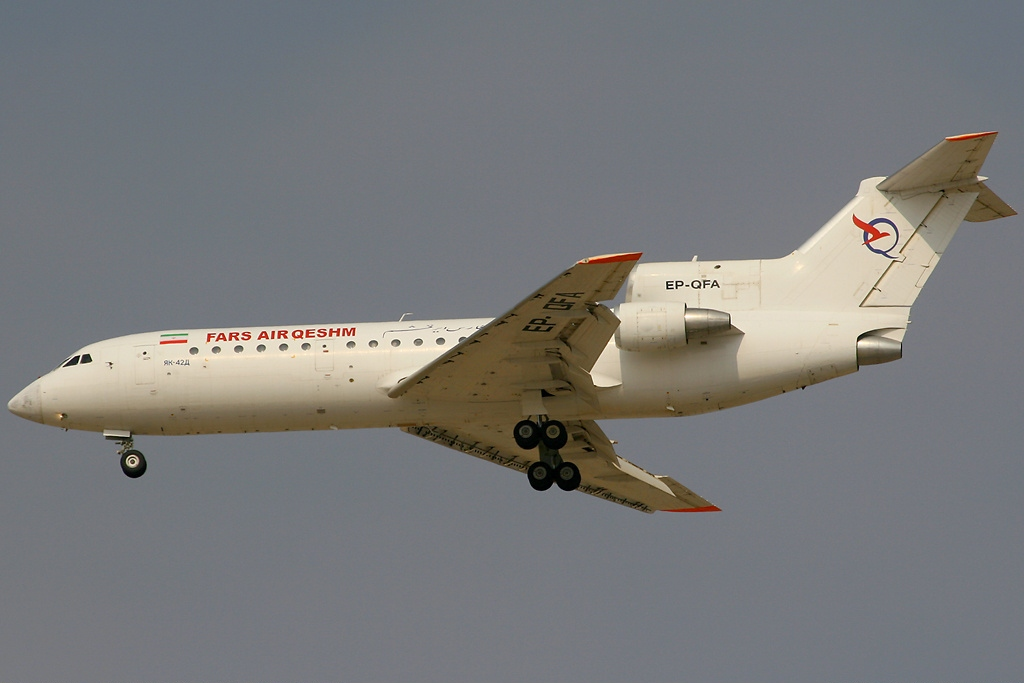
A Fars Air Qeshm Yakovlev Yak-42 landing at Dubai International Airport, United Arab Emirates. (2006)

=== Current fleet ===
As of July 2026, Fars Air Qeshm operates the following aircraft:

Fars Air Qeshm Fleet
Aircraft	In Fleet	Notes
Boeing 747-200FSCD	2	
Total	2	

=== Former fleet ===
The airline also operated the following aircraft:

Fars Air Qeshm Historic Fleet
Aircraft	Notes
McDonnell Douglas MD-83	Operated by Bukovyna Airlines
Yakovlev Yak-42	

== Incidents and accidents ==
- In September 2018, Israeli sources published some pictures claiming that a Boeing 747 belonging to Fars Air Qeshm was hit during an Israeli air force operation at Damascus International Airport.
- In March 2019, a Boeing 747 belonging to Fars Air Qeshm was damaged, with no injuries reported, at Hamad International Airport in Doha during cargo unloading.
