= Iran Air Joint Stock Company =

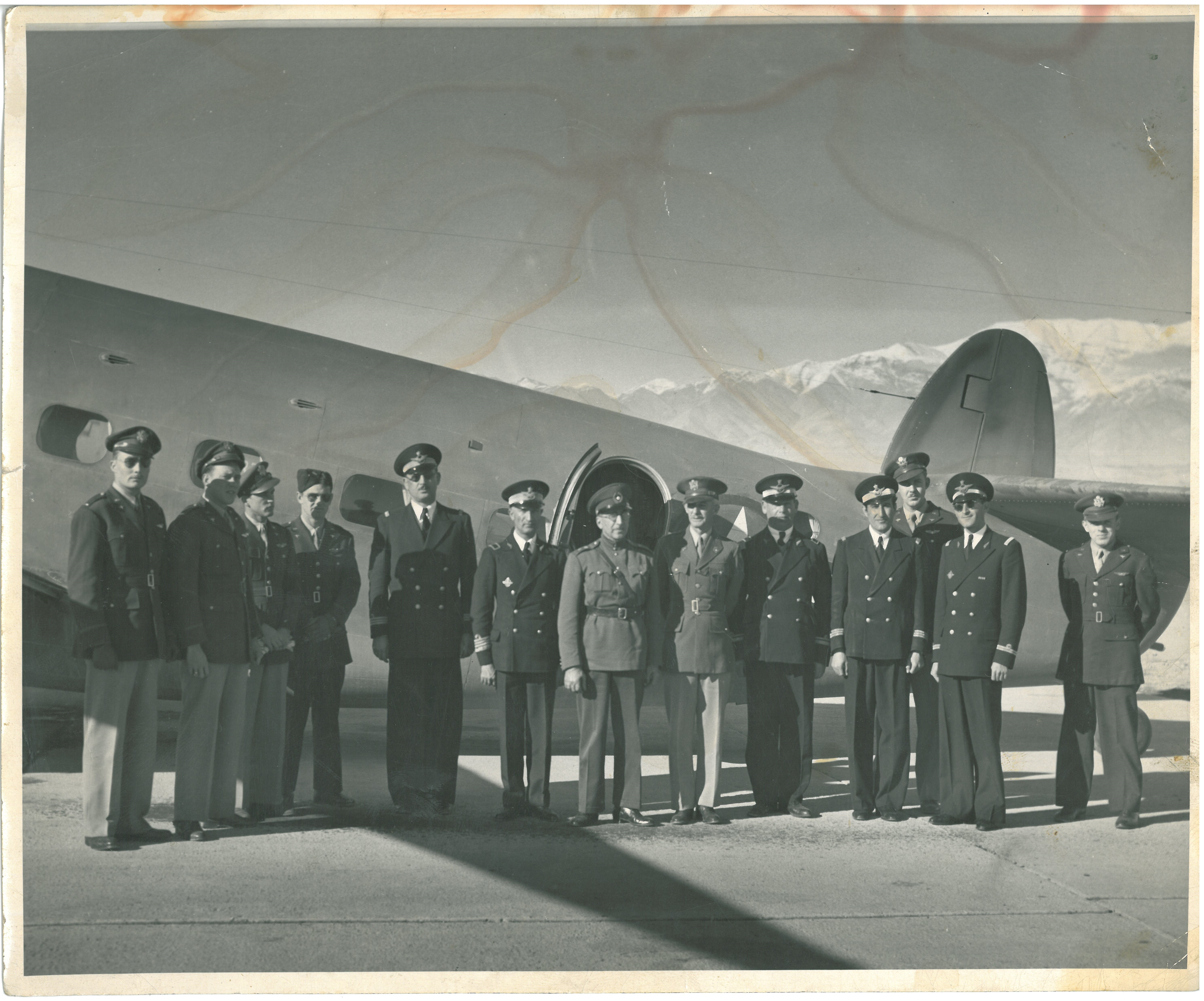
- Industry: Air Transport
- Founded: 1944
- Defunct: 1961
- Headquarters: Saadi Street, Tejarat Bank Alley, Tehran, Iran

The Iran Air Joint Stock Company was an airline based out of Iran which owned Iranian Airways. The airline initially began operations in 1944 and eventually started flying to Europe using the Douglas DC 4 and Douglas DC 3s. The airline would grow as Iran developed.

== Accident ==
On January 4, 1952 an Iran Air Joint Stock Company Douglas DC 3 crashed due to thick fog which killed 27 people.
