= TMA Cargo =

Inactive cargo airline in Lebanon

Trans Mediterranean Airways الخطوط الجوية عبر المتوسط
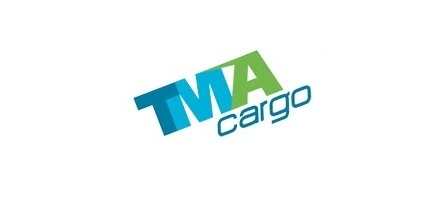

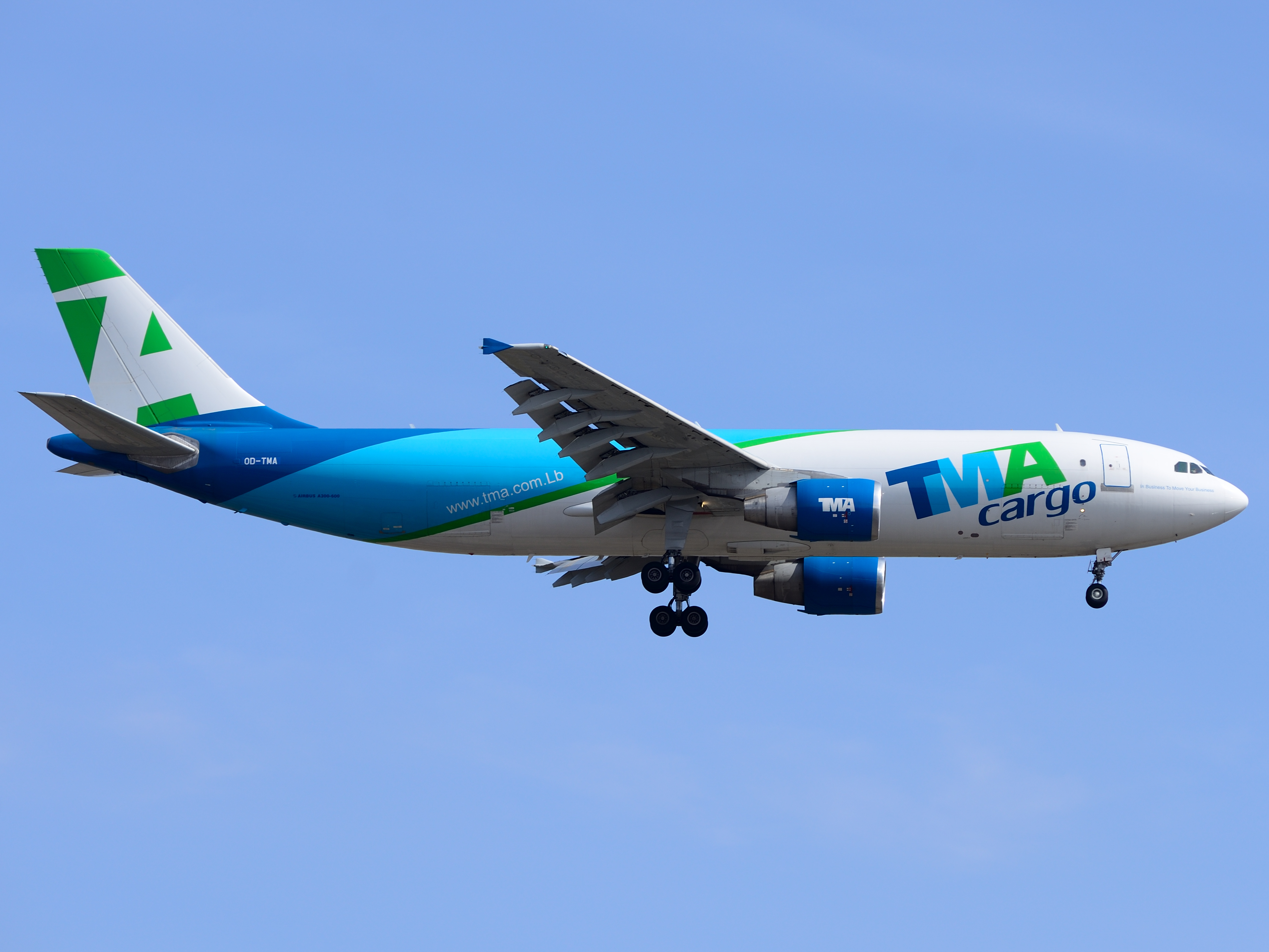
- Airbus A300-600RF landing at Amsterdam Schiphol airport
IATA	ICAO	Call sign
TL	TMA	TANGO LIMA
- Founded: 1953
- Commenced operations: 1953–2004; 2010–2014
- Ceased operations: 2014
- Hubs: Beirut Rafic Hariri International Airport
- Fleet size: 1
- Destinations: 15 (59 prior to February 2004)
- Headquarters: Beirut, Lebanon
- Key people: Mazen Bsat (CEO); Ralph Nehme (CFO)
- Website: www.tma.com.lb/

Trans Mediterranean Airways SAL, styled as TMA Cargo (Arabic: الخطوط الجوية عبر المتوسط), was a cargo airline based in Beirut, Lebanon. The airline restarted operations in 2010, following a six-year hiatus. It suspended operations once again in September 2014.

TMA Cargo was a member of IATA and of the Arab Air Carriers' Organization.

== History ==
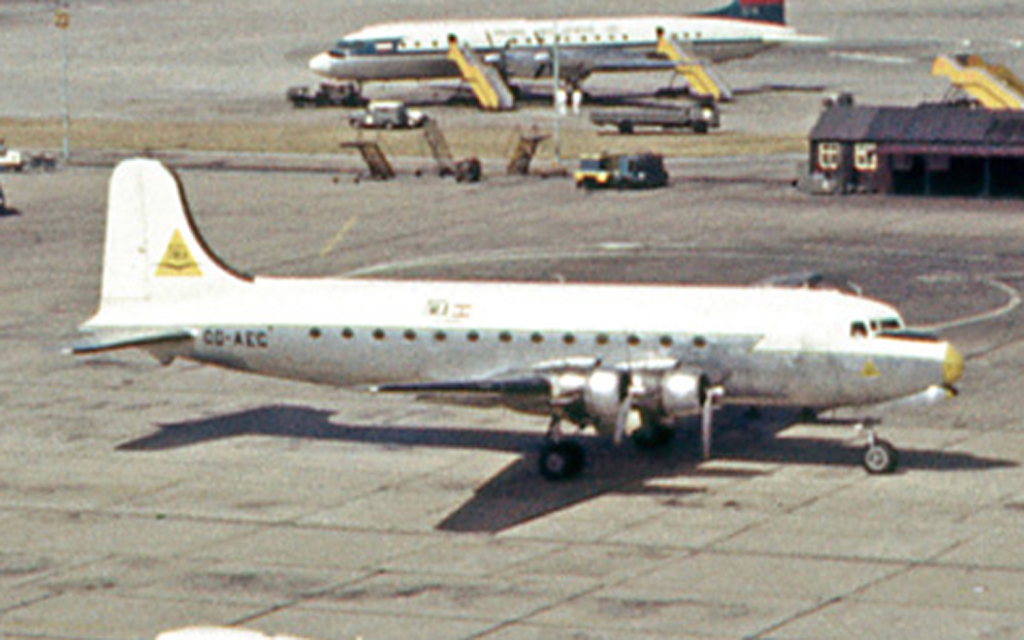
A Douglas DC-4 freighter at London Heathrow Airport in 1962

The airline was established and started operations in 1953 as a non-scheduled carrier operating cargo and passenger services. It was certified as the only Lebanese scheduled all-cargo carrier in 1959. It acquired its first Douglas DC-4 four-engine cargo aircraft in May 1959 and its first pressurized Douglas DC-6A freighter in March 1963.

Trans Mediterranean Airways (TMA) was the first all-cargo carrier to establish round the world services in both directions. However the Lebanese crisis adversely affected TMA growth and operation. In November 1996, following the Lebanese "Horizon 2000" reconstruction plan, investment banker Fadi Saab was appointed Chairman and President and the airline took measures to modernise its operations, restructure activities and increase capital to around $40 million. TMA was owned by Lebanese Air Investment Holding (99.9%) and private investors (0.1%).

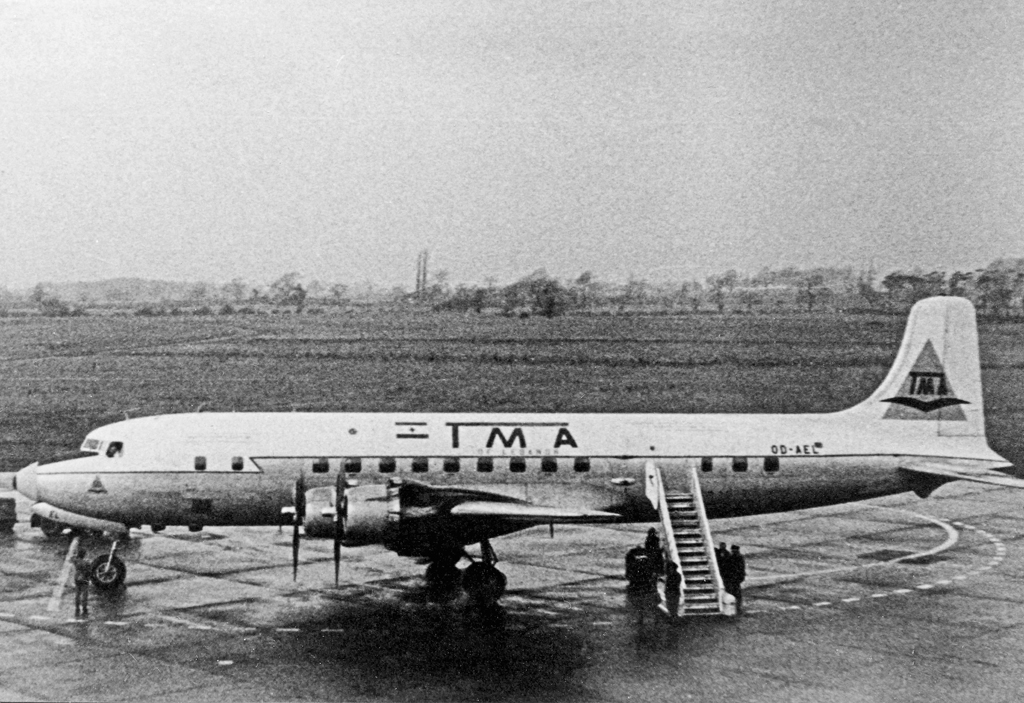
A Douglas DC-6A at Manchester Airport in 1964

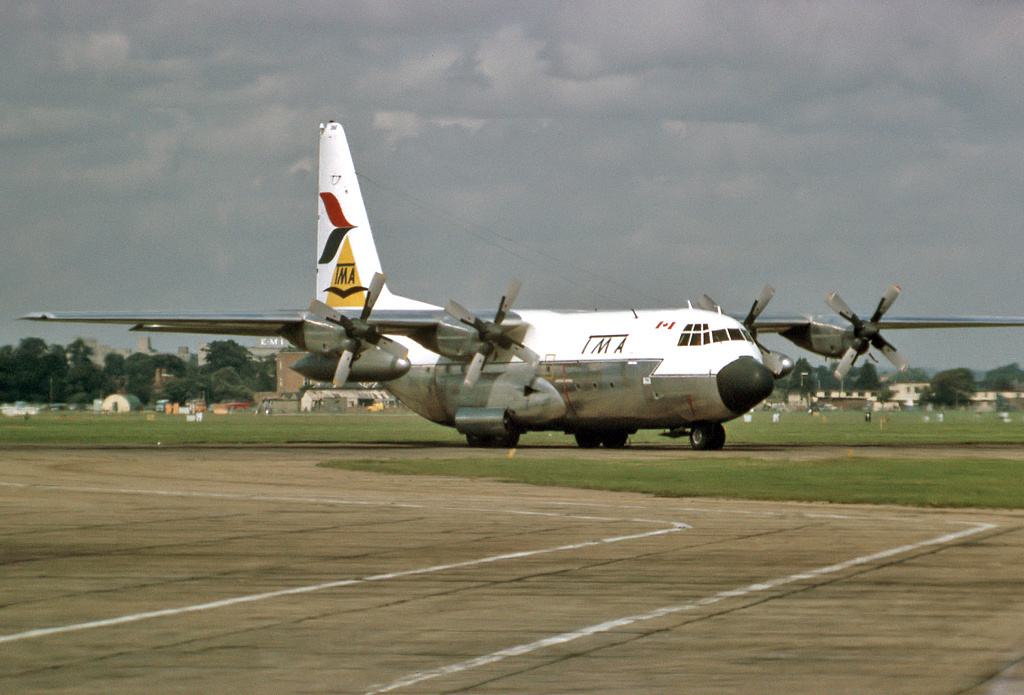
A Pacific Western Airlines Hercules, operating for TMA, at London Heathrow Airport in August 1967

In 2000, TMA introduced a new livery to their fleet. The new livery featured a white body with a grey belly, green 'TMA' and yellow 'CARGO' titles across the fuselage and new green decals on the tail.

In 2002, TMA leased an Airbus A310-304F from Islandsflug during April to November, to operate their European routes as the Boeing 707's had been banned from Europe. The airline also planned a new passenger charter airline called TMA-Leisure which would have leased an Airbus A320 aircraft to operate for Lebanese tour-operators. However, this never happened. During 2002, TMA made a $11 million loss.

TMA ceased all flights in February 2004 when the Lebanese Civil Aviation Authority (LCAA) pulled its Air Operating Certificate (AOC) citing safety concerns over its aging Boeing 707 fleet. The airline was in serious financial troubles and as a result was unable to modernize its fleet.

In September 2005, there were reports that TMA was planning to relaunch operations with a renewed fleet by acquiring medium-haul freight aircraft to replace their grounded 707 fleet, small freighter aircraft for feeder routes, and two Boeing 747-200F aircraft for long-haul freighter flights to the far east, this never happened.

In 2008, Mazen Bsat, Lebanese investor, owner and CEO of Med Airways (formally Flying Carpet), bought TMA for $1 in exchange of clearing the airlines $60 million debt.

In October 2009, TMA launched renovated facilities and a new image, following this TMA also announced that they are to relaunch services. They acquired an Airbus A300-600F for the new cargo operations. In February 2010, the aircraft was painted in the new TMA Cargo livery. In September or December 2014, its last aircraft was returned to lessor. Prior to suspending operations in 2014, TMA Cargo had planned to add Airbus A300 freighters once they were beginning to expand.

== Destinations ==
TMA Cargo resumed scheduled operations to 14 destinations from their hub in Beirut. As well as the 14 scheduled destinations, TMA Cargo also introduced charter flights on special request to various countries throughout Europe.

== Fleet ==
TMA old logo, used until 2004.

TMA Cargo operated the following aircraft as of December 2012:

TMA Cargo fleet
Aircraft	In fleet	Comment
Airbus A300F4-622R	1	
Boeing 767-300F	1	operated by euroAtlantic Airways

=== Previous fleet ===
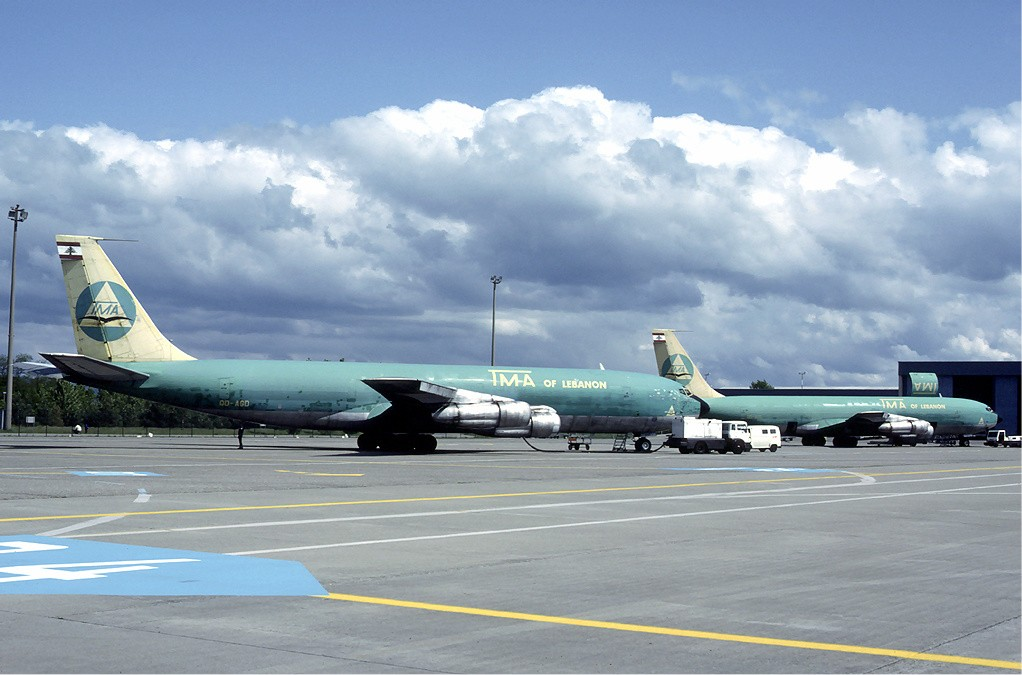
Boeing 707s at EuroAirport Basel-Mulhouse-Freiburg (Switzerland) in 1984

TMA operated the following aircraft in its operating life:

- Airbus A310-304F – leased from Islandsflug
- Avro York
- Boeing 707-320C
- Boeing 707-330C
- Boeing 747-100SF
- Canadair CL-44 – operated by Seaboard World Airlines
- Douglas DC-4
- Douglas DC-6

== Incidents and accidents ==
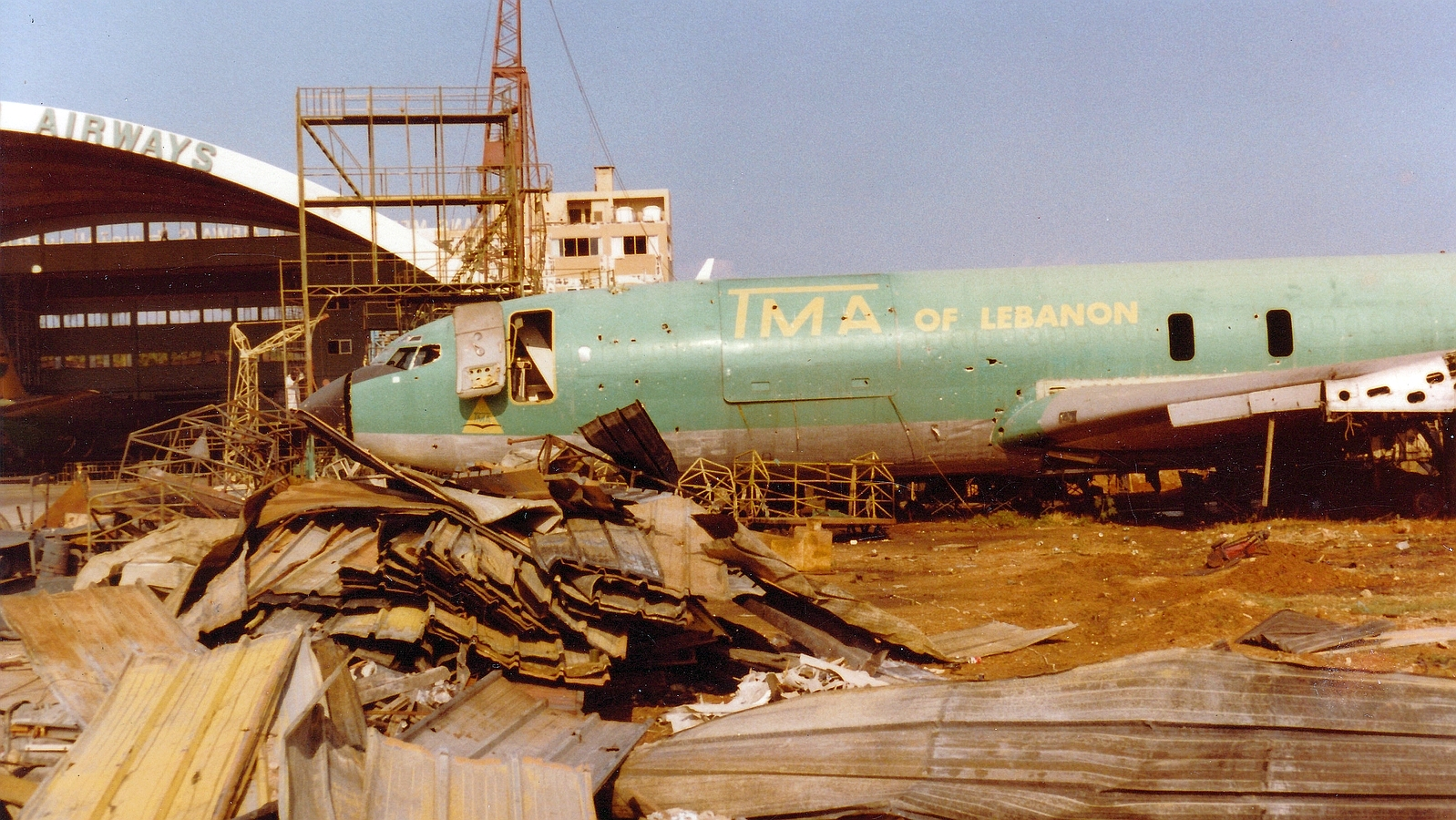
A Boeing 707 at Beirut airport damaged during the Lebanese Civil War of 1982

TMA had 14 incidents and accidents, four of which had fatalities. The total fatality count during operations (1953–2004) was 20.

TMA had the following incidents and accidents until ceasing operations in February 2004;

- On 9 July 1962, TMA Flight 104, a Douglas DC-4, crashed shortly after take-off from Brindisi Airport, Brindisi, Italy. The flight took off at 21:41 (GMT), however the plane struggled to gain height and began to descend followed by the plane tilting to the left and colliding with the sea. All 6 crew members were killed.
- On 12 December 1963, a TMA Douglas DC-4, flying from Kuwait International Airport, Kuwait to Kabul International Airport, Afghanistan, crashed into the White Mountains, Afghanistan. The plane was diverting to Lahore due to weather condition at Kabul. All three crew members were killed.
- On 10 March 1966, a TMA Douglas DC-6, flying from Beirut International Airport, Lebanon to Frankfurt Airport, Germany, crashed into Mt Parnon, Greece. All five crew members were killed.
- On 23 July 1979, a TMA Boeing 707-320C, on a test flight for 4 co-pilots due to be promoted to captains, crashed whilst on a third touch-and-go at Beirut International Airport. The plane touched down but then yawed right to left to right again before the wing clipped the ground causing the plane to flip and come to rest inverted across a taxiway. All six crew were killed.
