= Iran Air =

National airline of Iran

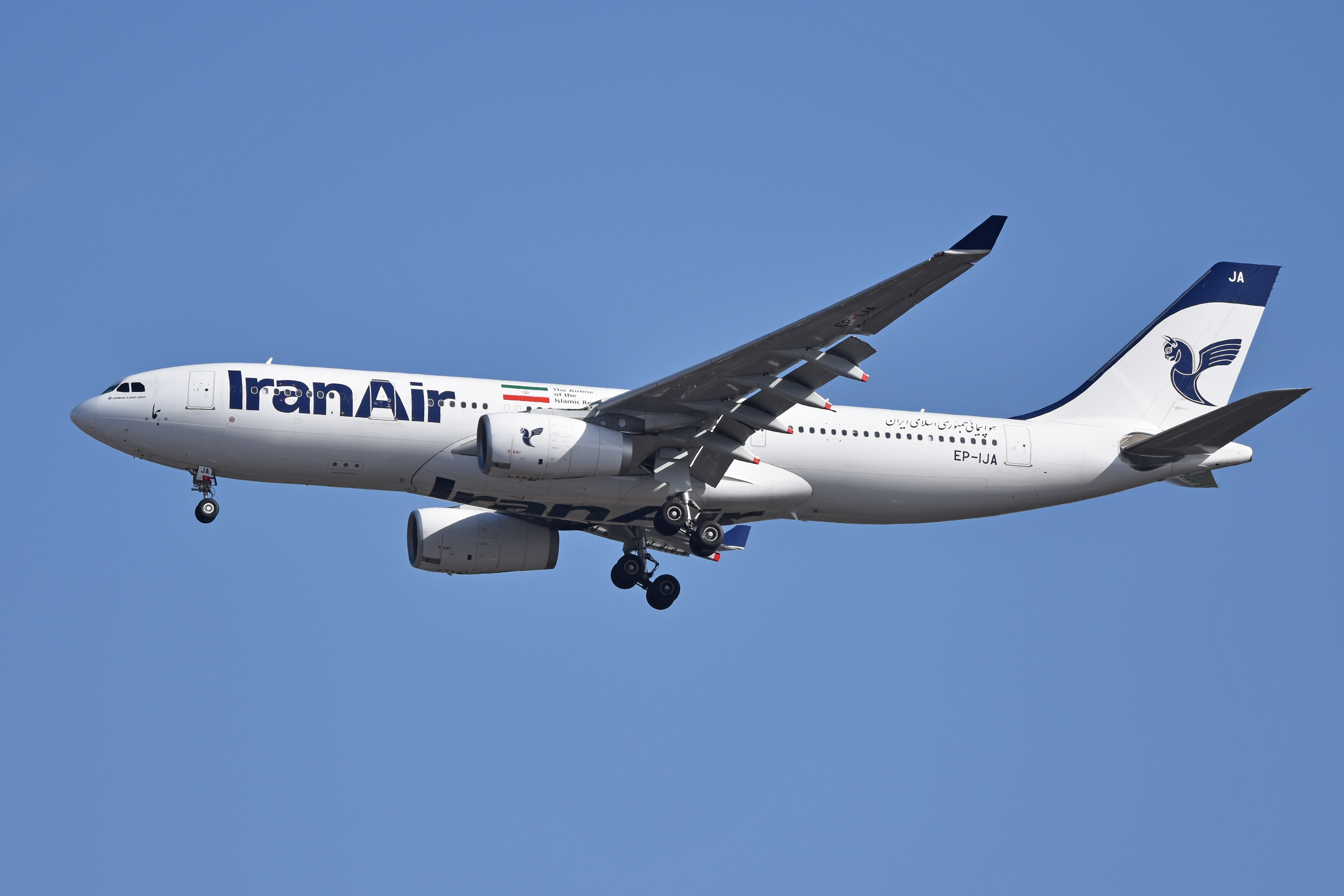
- Iran Air Airbus A330-200
IATA	ICAO	Call sign
IR	IRA	IRANAIR
- Founded: May 1944; 82 years ago as Iranian Airways Company
- Commenced operations: February 1961; 65 years ago (as Iran Air)
- AOC #: FS-100
- Hubs: Tehran–Imam Khomeini; Tehran–Mehrabad
- Focus cities: Bandar Abbas; Isfahan; Mashhad; Shiraz
- Frequent-flyer program: SkyGift
- Subsidiaries: Iran Air Cargo; Iran Air Ground Services; Iran Air Catering; Homa Aviation Training Center
- Fleet size: 32
- Destinations: 62
- Parent company: Ministry of Roads and Urban Development (60%)
- Headquarters: Mehrabad International Airport, Tehran, Iran
- Key people: Taher Abdolhai, chairman & CEO
- Revenue: ▲$329.74 million (2013)
- Operating income: ▼$7.99 million (2013)
- Net income: ▼ -$71.67 million (2013)
- Total assets: ▼$477.62 million (2013)
- Total equity: ▼$34,972 (2013)
- Employees: 10,696 (2013)
- Website: IranAir.com

Iran Air, officially known as The Airline of the Islamic Republic of Iran (Persian: هواپیمایی جمهوری اسلامی ایران, romanized: Havâpeymâyi-ye Jomhuri-ye Eslâmi-ye Irân), and previously as The National Airline of Iran (هواپیمایی ملی ایران, Havâpeymâyi-ye Melli-ye Irân), is the flag carrier of Iran, which is headquartered at Mehrabad Airport in Tehran. Until 2024, before being sanctioned by Europe, it operated scheduled services to 72 destinations in Asia and Europe. Iran Air's main bases are Imam Khomeini International Airport and Mehrabad International Airport, both serving Tehran, the capital of Iran. Domestically, Iran Air is commonly known as "Homa" (هما), which is the name of a mythical Persian phoenix or griffin, and also the acronym of Iran National Airlines in the Persian language. The airline's cargo division, Iran Air Cargo, operates scheduled services internationally using one cargo aircraft.

The airline has been sanctioned in 2024 by the United States and the European Union for its role in the provision of Iranian weaponry to Russia during the Russo-Ukrainian War.

== History ==
=== Early years ===
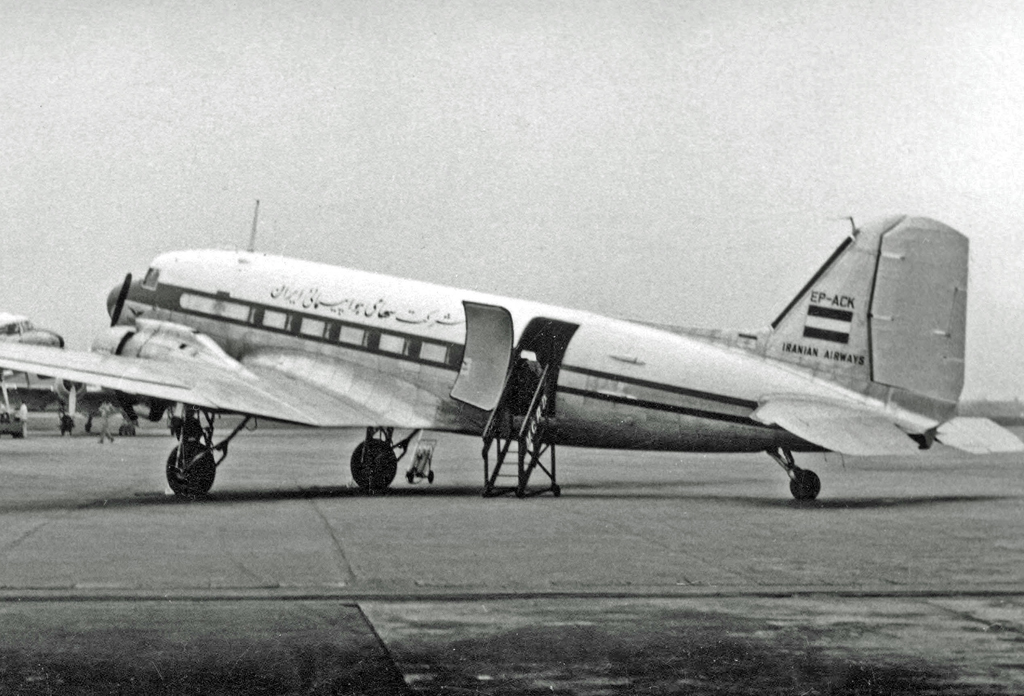
An Iranian Airways Douglas DC-3 freighter in 1954

Iranian Airways was founded in May 1944 by Reza Afshar and Gholam Ebtehaj. Post-war, its first passenger flight was from Tehran to Mashhad, followed by a Tehran-Esfahan-Shiraz-Bushehr-Abadan-Ahwaz service. In 1946 the airline established service to Cairo, Baghdad, and Tel Aviv, and in April 1947, to Paris. Between 1945 and 1961, the airline became a major domestic carrier, also operating some international flights to Europe each week. The fleet consisted of Douglas DC-3s initially, supplemented by Douglas DC-4 and Vickers Viscount aircraft later on.

In 1954, the privately owned airline Persian Air Services (PAS) was established. PAS initially operated only freight services, followed by passenger operations between Tehran and other major cities in Iran. In 1960, PAS initiated passenger service to several European destinations, including Geneva, Paris, Brussels and London, using Boeing 707 and Douglas DC-7 aircraft leased from Belgium's Sabena airline.

Iranian Airways was nationalized in 1961. On 24 February 1961, Iranian Airways and PAS merged to form the Iran National Airlines Corporation (HOMA), known as Iran Air, using the Homa bird as a symbol. HOMA was a public sector venture that combined the two predecessor air carriers. Among the aircraft used were Avro Yorks, Douglas DC-3s, Douglas DC-6s, and Vickers Viscounts. The carrier became a full member of the International Air Transport Association (IATA) in 1964. Iran Air and South African Airways were the launch customers for the Boeing 747SP.

=== Rise to global prominence ===
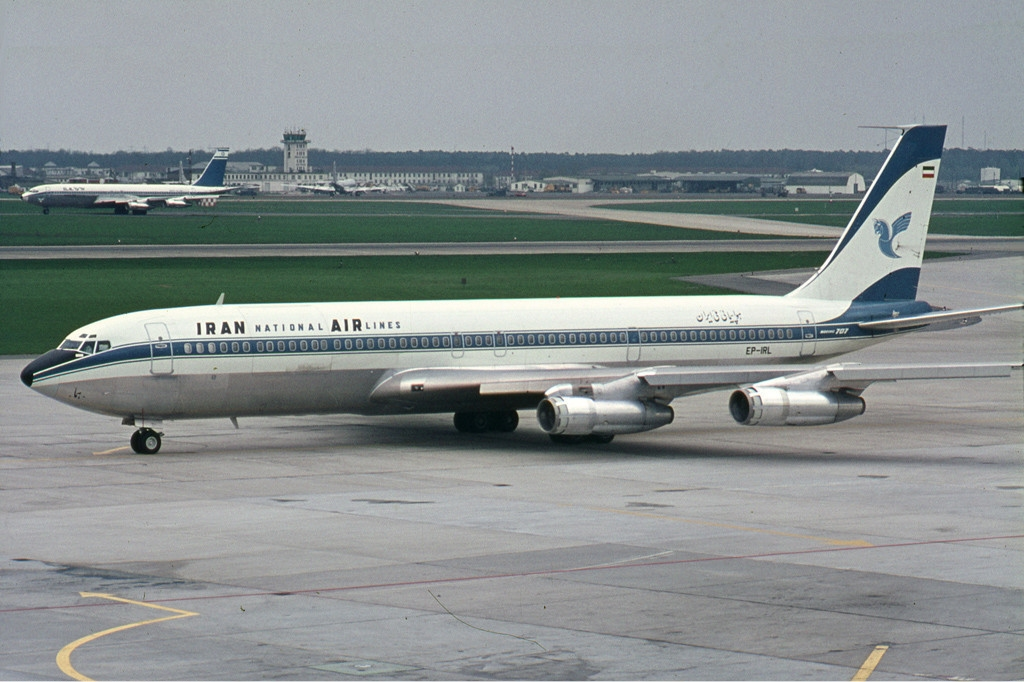
Iran Air Boeing 707-320 at Frankfurt Airport in 1970

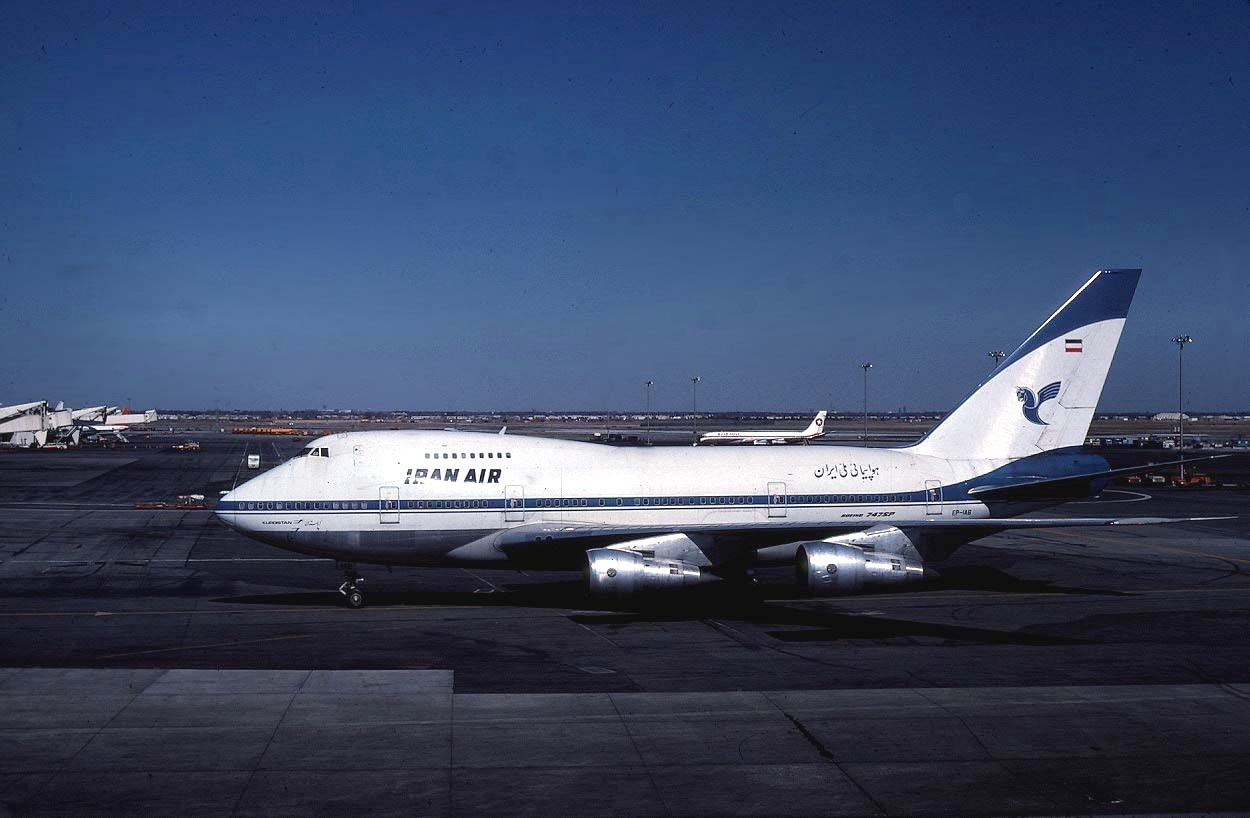
Iran Air Boeing 747SP at John F. Kennedy International Airport in 1976

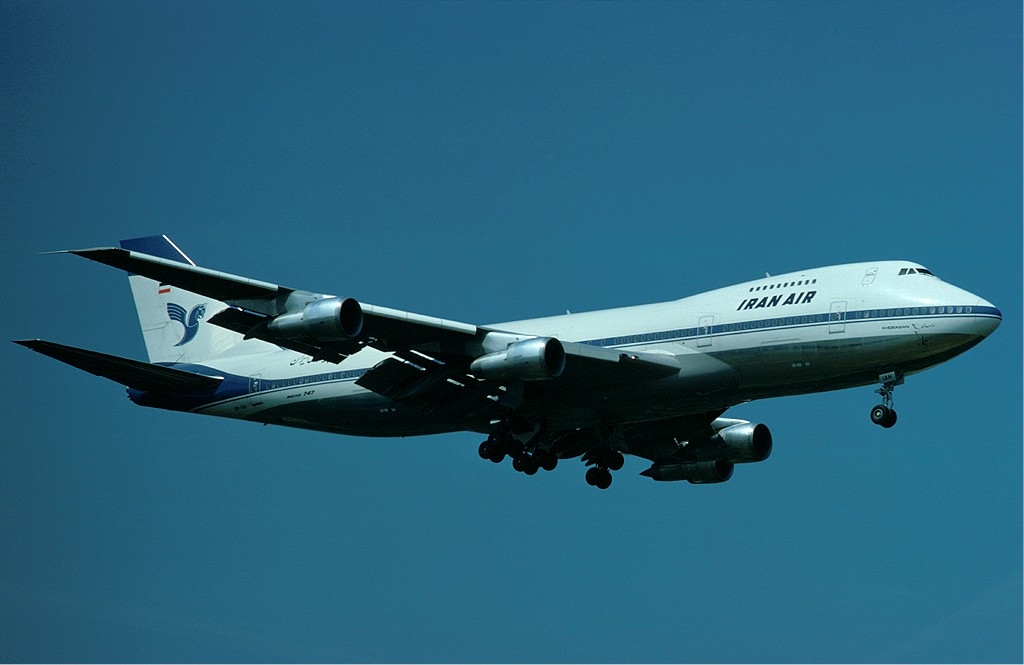
Iran Air Boeing 747-200 in 1977

In 1965, Iran Air took delivery of its first jet aircraft, the Boeing 707 and six Boeing 727-100, followed by the Boeing 737-200 in 1971, three of the stretched Boeing 727-200 in 1974, and three variants of Boeing 747 (one 747-100B, two −200M and four SP), starting in 1978–1979. By the mid-1970s, Iran Air was serving cities in Europe with non-stop and one-stop flights, including over 30 flights a week to London alone.

On 29 May 1971, the Tehran to New York City route was inaugurated, using Boeing 707s making a stop-over at Heathrow Airport. Shortly thereafter, the route was upgraded to a non-stop flight using Boeing 747SPs, making Iran Air the second Middle Eastern carrier (after El Al), to offer non-stop service to New York. With this flight, Iran Air set a new world record in time and distance for a non-stop, scheduled long-haul flight (12 hours and 15 minutes, 9,867 km – 6,131 mi – 5,328 nm). In 1978, the airline acquired six Airbus A300 aircraft for use on its domestic trunk and busy regional routes. By the end of that year, Iran Air was serving 31 international destinations stretching from New York City to Beijing and Tokyo. Plans were made to offer direct services to Los Angeles and to Sydney, for which the airline's long range Boeing 747SP aircraft were ideal. This would have allowed Iran Air to use Tehran as a midway point between East and West, because of its favorable geographical location. Such plans were never realized but they bear considerable resemblance to the hub-and-spoke strategies later adopted by the ME3 carriers and Turkish Airlines.

Lt. Gen. Ali-Mohammad Khademi was the general manager of Iran Air from 1962 to 1978.

=== The Islamic Revolution ===
As a result of economic sanctions against Iran, Iran Air was unable to expand or replace its fleet. The airline as such saw little progress during this time as planes had to be parted out. In 1980 the airline changed its official name to Islamic Republic of Iran Airlines and carried 1.7 million passengers that year. The airline had suffered its worst accident to date in the year of 1988 when Iran Air flight 655 was shot down killing 290 people. The last time Iran Air was delivered brand-new Western aircraft prior to the 2016 lifting of nuclear-related sanctions was in 1994 when it received two Airbus A300-B4s in compensation for the downing of Iran Air Flight 655 by an American cruiser in 1988.

In 2001, Iran Air purchased six second-hand Airbus A300s from Turkey, but after only two years, all six of them ended up grounded at airports in Tehran, Mashhad and Moscow. This caused significant controversy in Iran where officials cited GE engine design flaw and subsequent overheating as the reason for grounding the planes. One of these six planes was later confirmed to have returned to service by 2010.

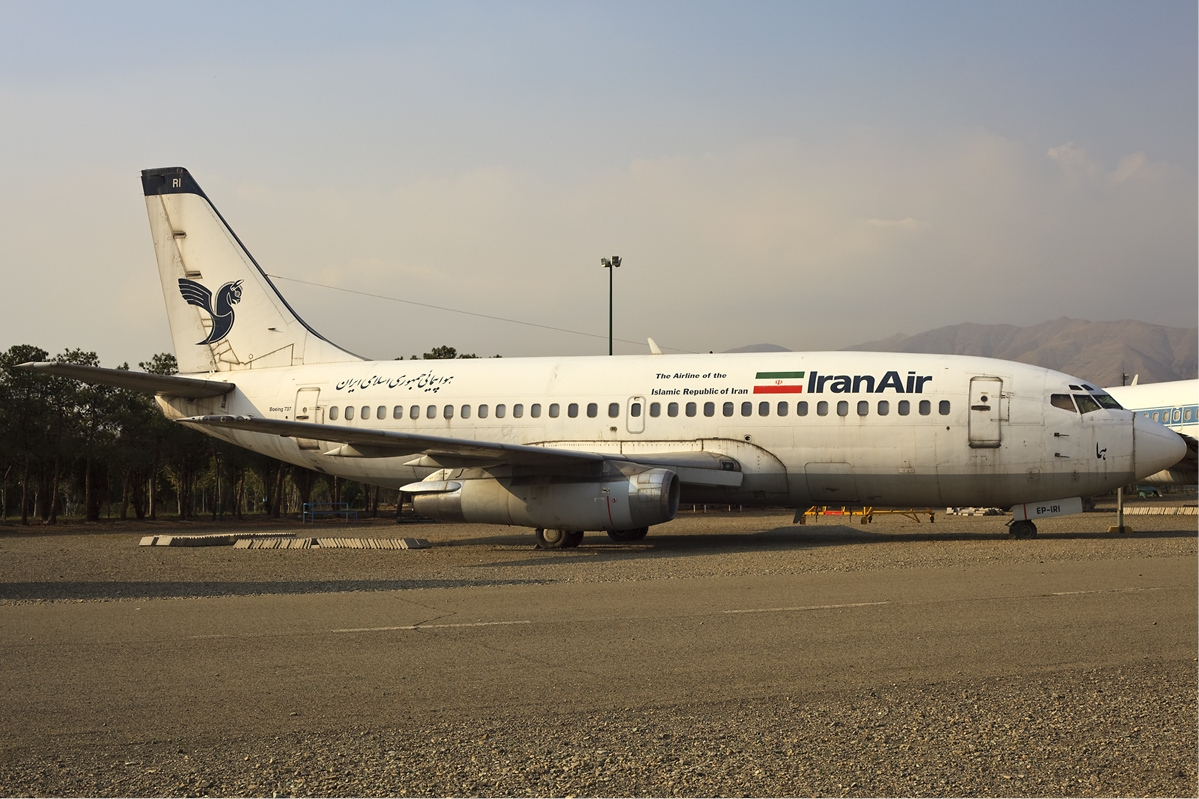
A Boeing 737-200 of Iran Air in 2009.

As a result of the close ties between Iran and Venezuela, Iran Air launched a route from Tehran to Caracas via Damascus in March 2007. The airline codeshared with Conviasa on the flight, and the passengers included Iranian tourists and Lebanese Venezuelans. The service was costly to operate. Iran Air utilised a Boeing 747SP, which consumed large amounts of fuel. In addition, the company had to restrict the number of passengers on the flight from Damascus to Caracas, as the high altitude and heat prevented the plane from taking off with a full cabin and fuel tanks. Ultimately, Iran Air lost over US$100,000 per flight. In October 2007, it handed the route over to Conviasa. In 2007 the Fokker 100 was added to the fleet.

Prior to the separation of Iran Air Tours from Iran Air in 2011, Russian-made Tupolev Tu-154s formed the backbone of the former's fleet. However, several successive disasters involving this plane ultimately led to a 2011 blanket ban on its operations within Iranian airlines, including Iran Air Tours. The Tu-154 fleet was gradually replaced with MD-83s over the course of a few months.

According to Iran's Deputy Minister of Roads and Urban Development in 2014, Iran had more than 100 planes, some of them owned by Iran Air, grounded due to the lack of access to new parts and technical expertise during the sanctions era.

The prolonged period of time that Iran Air was under international sanctions and barred from purchasing spare parts and new planes led to a dramatic rise in its average fleet age and plunging safety record. As of March 2017, Iran Air's average fleet age stands at 24.1 years, though this figure is set to improve through addition of new deliveries.

Iran Air's subpar on-time performance, amongst those of most other Iranian airlines, has led to public anger and frustration, often inciting protests in the form of violent confrontations with the airline employees or airplane sit-ins for many hours after a severely delayed flight has finally landed. Officials routinely attribute the delays to the economic sanctions, although at least one pro-revolutionary ideologue has cited "inefficiency and mismanagement" as the chief cause of this issue.

=== EU ban and refueling issues ===
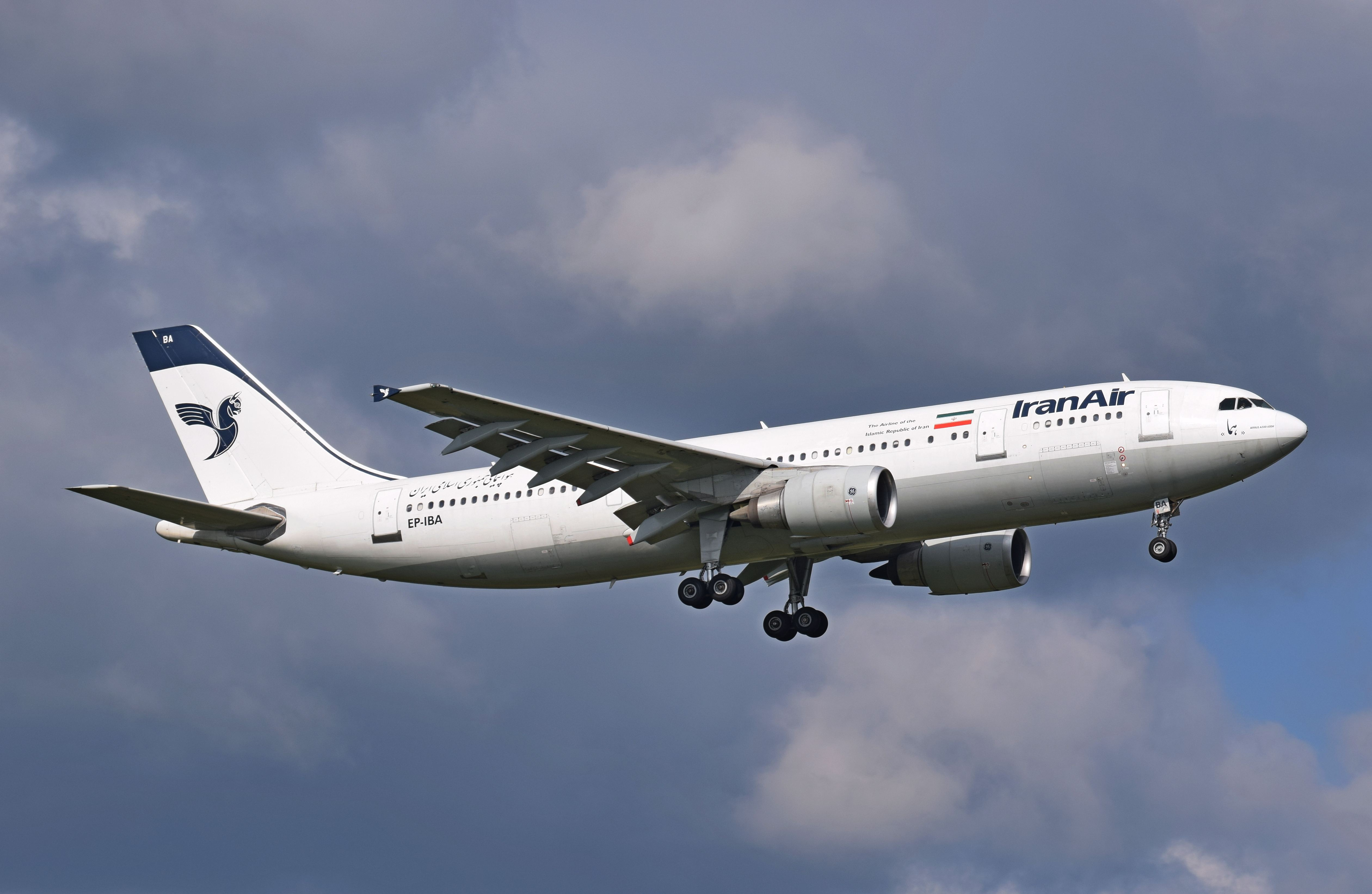
An Iran Air Airbus A300B4-600R, 2014. As of 2026, Iran Air is one of the last remaining commercial operators of the Airbus A300.

On 5 July 2010, an aviation official of Iran accused the UK, Germany and the United Arab Emirates of refusing to refuel Iranian passenger jets. This move followed unilateral sanctions imposed by the US over the nuclear weapons dispute. Iran Air and Mahan Air both claimed to have been denied refuelling. A spokeswoman for Abu Dhabi Airports Company (ADAC) said that a contract was in place to refuel Iranian passenger flights and ADAC would continue to do so. A spokesperson for the United Kingdom Civil Aviation Authority said that it was the sole decision of independent suppliers if aircraft were to be refuelled or not. Germany's Transport Ministry said the refuelling of Iranian aircraft was not banned under EU or UN sanctions but did not say whether any independent refuellers were denying refuelling. Later in the day, Dubai Airport revealed that it continued to refuel Iranian passengers flights in and out of Dubai. The next day, a spokesperson for Iran said that no such limitation had been imposed.

On 6 July 2010, it was announced that the European Commission would ban all of Iran Air's Airbus A320, Boeing 727 and Boeing 747 fleet from the EU over safety concerns. This move came as a major blow to Iran Air, limiting flights to Europe with its own aircraft.

In 2012, the EU re-allowed the refuelling of Iran Air aircraft at secondary European airports such as Ljubljana and Budapest, in an effort to retain the refuelling contracts within the EU, rather than letting them go to Serbia or later Belarus and Ukraine.

In January 2012, Iran Air's flights to and from London Heathrow operated with a fuel stop at Manston Airport in Kent. However, the airport announced in December 2011 that this arrangement was to end and it would no longer refuel the company's aircraft. This announcement swiftly followed the closure of Iran's embassy in London as the consequence of the ransacking of the British embassy in Tehran. The airport stressed that it had not breached any trade agreements, as it had no connections with the US.

=== Lifting of sanctions and modernization plans ===
Iran Air orders after the JCPOA
Manufacturer	Aircraft type	Orders	Deliveries	Contract value (in billions)	List prices (in billions)
Airbus	A320-200	6	—N/a	—N/a	$0.606
Airbus	A320neo	32	—N/a	—N/a	$3.232
Airbus	A321-200	9	1	—N/a	$0.946
Airbus	A330-200	9	2	—N/a	$1.908
Airbus	A330-900	28	—N/a	—N/a	$8.299
Airbus	A350-1000	16	—N/a	—N/a	$5.864
	A380-800	12	—N/a	—N/a	
Total		100	3	< $10.0	$20.856
Boeing	737 MAX 8	50	—N/a	—N/a	$5.620
Boeing	777-300ER	15	—N/a	—N/a	$5.207
Boeing	777-9	15	—N/a	—N/a	$6.132
Total		80	0	$8.0 to $9.5	$16.959
ATR	72-600	20	13	$0.536	$1.09
Total		200	16	$18.5 to $20.0	$38.334

In anticipation of a deal being reached for the lifting of sanctions, the chairman of Iran Air, Farhad Parvaresh, stated that the airline would then seek to obtain at least 100 wide-body and short-haul jets.

On Friday 15 January 2016 US president Barack Obama authorized his secretary of state, John Kerry, to lift the sanctions on Iran civil aviation. Following Iran's implementation of the Joint Comprehensive Plan of Action (JCPOA) on 16 January 2016, all sanctions on Iran civil aviation were lifted. As a result, Iranian airlines, including Iran Air, were granted permission to purchase new civil aircraft from any manufacturer as well as to refuel at all European airports, except for two Swedish destinations, Stockholm and Gothenburg, due to the fuel supplier BP still refusing to provide fuel to the Iranian carriers.

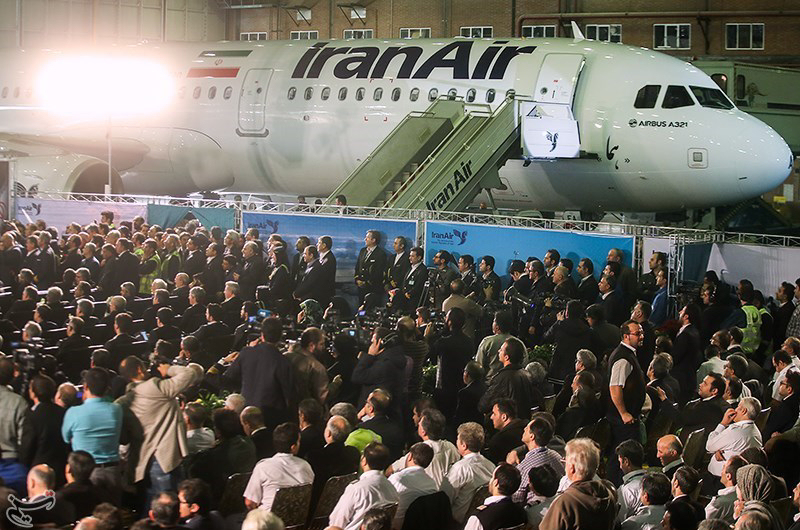
An A321 of Iran Air that just arrived

On 24 January 2016 Tehran hosted the CAPA Iran Aviation Summit organised by CAPA - Centre for Aviation in order to bring both Iranian and international aviation authorities together for considering development plans for Iran's aviation industry. CAPA put the size of Iran's economy somewhere between those of Turkey and Australia, whose commercial airline fleets are in the order of 500-600 aircraft. Bombardier presented its regional models during the CAPA summit in Tehran. In a statement, Mr. Parvaresh announced that his airline expected to spend some 3-5 billion US dollars purchasing regional aircraft from manufacturers Airbus, Boeing, Bombardier and Embraer.

=== Further sanctions ===
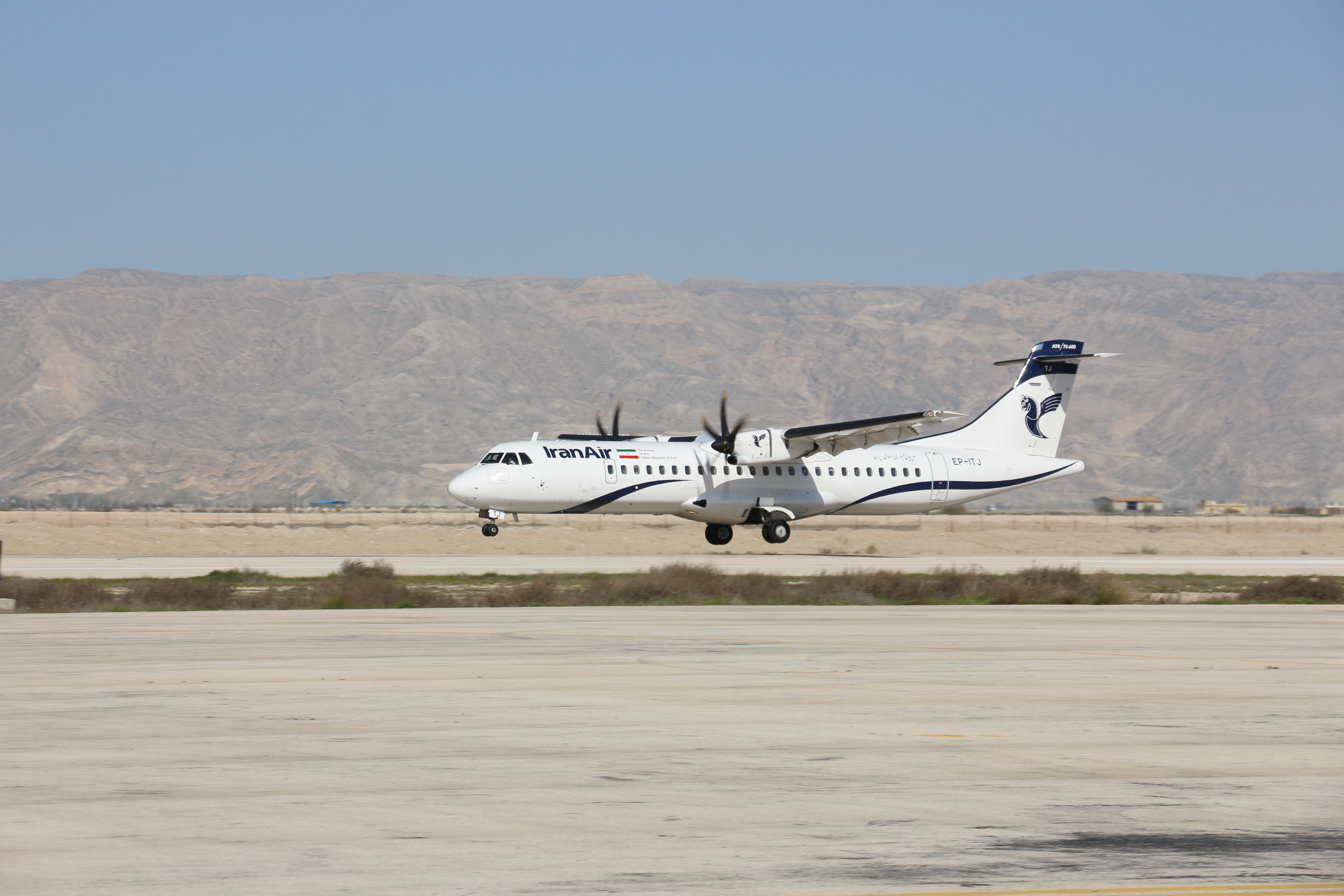
One of the final ATR 72-600s which was delivered to Iran August 2018.

On 8 May 2018, following US withdrawal from the Iran nuclear deal, and as part of the reinstatement of the United States sanctions against Iran lifted in 2015, US Treasury Secretary Steven Mnuchin announced the decision to revoke all Iran sales licenses already granted to plane manufacturers Boeing and Airbus after a 90-day period.

It was announced that Iran Air had to cancel the order for Boeing aircraft due to President Trump's decision to reimpose sanctions against Iran, despite this it has been announced that Iran Air will still be receiving ATR aircraft. It has not yet been announced if Airbus aircraft will still be delivered. Any aircraft being delivered to Iran Air must be delivered within a 90 to 180 day period before the sanctions begin. While members of the Trump administration have advised European companies to stop doing business with Iran now, Federica Mogherini said the European aim was "maintaining and deepening economic relations with Iran. "The technical experts plan to propose ways to avert disruptions in air, sea and land transport from and to Iran and keep channels open for "effective banking transactions."

In September 2024, Germany, France and the United Kingdom announced a new row of sanctions against Iran Air, restricting the airline's ability to operate into European airspace. That same month, the United States Department of the Treasury sanctioned Iran Air due to its role in the transfer of weaponry to Russia during the Russia-Ukraine war. In October 2024, the European Union sanctioned Iran Air due to its role in transferring ballistic missiles to Russia.

In 2026, after a six day suspension the airline restarted operations.

== Onboard restrictions ==
Iran Air is one of the few airlines in the world that, pursuant to Islamic law, does not serve alcoholic beverages on any of its flights. Moreover, there is no choice of non-Halal food selections, such as those containing pork, on Iran Air's menu. This is a policy similar to many other airlines based in predominantly Muslim countries.

== Network ==
=== Destinations ===
As of May 2026, Iran Air operated flights to various domestic and international destinations across Asia and Europe. In late 2024, the European Union imposed sanctions on Iran Air, leading to the cancellation of all flights to the European Union.

Country	City	Airport	Notes	Refs
Afghanistan	Kabul	Kabul International Airport		
Armenia	Yerevan	Zvartnots International Airport	Seasonal	
Austria	Vienna	Vienna International Airport	Suspended	
Azerbaijan	Baku	Heydar Aliyev International Airport		
Bangladesh	Dhaka	Hazrat Shahjalal International Airport	Terminated	
Bahrain	Manama	Bahrain International Airport	Terminated	
China	Beijing	Beijing Capital International Airport	Terminated	
Cyprus	Larnaca	Larnaca International Airport	Terminated	
Denmark	Copenhagen	Copenhagen Airport	Terminated	
Egypt	Cairo	Cairo International Airport	Terminated	
France	Paris	Charles de Gaulle Airport	Suspended	
France	Paris	Orly Airport	Terminated	
Germany	Cologne	Cologne Bonn Airport	Suspended	
Germany	Hamburg	Hamburg Airport	Suspended	
Germany	Frankfurt	Frankfurt Airport	Suspended	
Germany	Munich	Munich Airport	Suspended	
Greece	Athens	Athens International Airport	Terminated	
Hungary	Budapest	Budapest Ferenc Liszt International Airport	Terminated	
India	Ahmedabad	Ahmedabad Airport		
India	Delhi	Indira Gandhi International Airport	Terminated	
India	Mumbai	Chhatrapati Shivaji Maharaj International Airport		
Iran	Abadan	Abadan Ayatollah Jami International Airport		
Iran	Abu Musa	Abu Musa Airport		
Iran	Arak	Arak International Airport		
Iran	Ardabil	Ardabil Airport		
Iran	Ahvaz	Qasem Soleimani International Airport		
Iran	Ardabil	Ardabil Airport		
Iran	Bam	Bam Airport		
Iran	Bandar Abbas	Bandar Abbas International Airport		
Iran	Bandar Bushehr	Bushehr Airport		
Iran	Bandar Lengeh	Bandar Lengeh Airport		
Iran	Birjand	Birjand International Airport		
Iran	Bojnord	Bojnord Airport		
Iran	Chahbahar	Chabahar Konarak Airport		
Iran	Gorgan	Gorgan Airport		
Iran	Hamedan	Hamedan International Airport		
Iran	Ilam	Ilam Airport		
Iran	Isfahan	Isfahan Shahid Beheshti International Airport	Focus city	
Iran	Iranshahr	Iranshahr Airport		
Iran	Jahrom	Jahrom International Airport		
Iran	Jiroft	Jiroft Airport		
Iran	Kalaleh	Kalaleh Airport		
Iran	Kerman	Ayatollah Hashemi Rafsanjani Airport		
Iran	Kermanshah	Kermanshah Airport		
Iran	Khorramabad	Khorramabad Airport		
Iran	Khoy	Khoy Airport		
Iran	Kish Island	Kish International Airport		
Iran	Lamerd	Lamerd International Airport		
Iran	Lar	Larestan Ayatollah Ayatollahi International Airport		
Iran	Lavan Island	Lavan Airport		
Iran	Mashhad	Mashhad Shahid Hasheminejad International Airport	Focus city	
Iran	Parsabad	Parsabad-Moghan Airport		
Iran	Qeshm Island	Qeshm International Airport		
Iran	Rafsanjan	Rafsanjan Airport		
Iran	Ramsar	Ramsar International Airport		
Iran	Rasht	Rasht Airport		
Iran	Sahand	Sahand Airport		
Iran	Sanandaj	Sanandaj Airport		
Iran	Sari	Dasht-e Naz Airport		
Iran	Sirjan	Sirjan Airport		
Iran	Shahrekord	Shahrekord Shahid Estaki International Airport		
Iran	Shahroud	Shahroud Airport		
Iran	Semnan	Semnan Municipal Airport		
Iran	Shiraz	Shiraz Shahid Dastgheib International Airport	Focus city	
Iran	Tabriz	Tabriz Shahid Madani International Airport		
Iran	Tehran	Mehrabad International Airport	Hub	
Iran	Tehran	Imam Khomeini International Airport	Hub	
Iran	Urmia	Urmia Shahid Bakeri International Airport		
Iran	Yasuj	Yasuj Airport		
Iran	Yazd	Shahid Sadooghi Airport		
Iran	Zabol	Zabol Airport		
Iran	Zahedan	Zahedan Airport		
Iraq	Baghdad	Baghdad International Airport		
Iraq	Najaf	Al Najaf International Airport	Seasonal	
Italy	Milan	Milan Malpensa Airport	Suspended	
Italy	Rimini	Rimini Fellini Airport	Suspended	
Italy	Rome	Rome Fiumicino Airport	Suspended	
Japan	Tokyo	Haneda Airport	Terminated	
Japan	Tokyo	Narita International Airport	Terminated	
Jordan	Amman	Queen Alia International Airport	Terminated	
Kazakhstan	Almaty	Almaty International Airport	Terminated	
Kuwait	Kuwait City	Kuwait International Airport		
Lebanon	Beirut	Beirut–Rafic Hariri International Airport	Suspended	
Kenya	Nairobi	Jomo Kenyatta International Airport	Terminated	
Malaysia	Kuala Lumpur	Kuala Lumpur International Airport	Terminated	
Morocco	Marrakesh	Marrakesh Menara Airport	Terminated	
Netherlands	Amsterdam	Amsterdam Airport Schiphol	Terminated	
Norway	Oslo	Oslo Airport, Gardermoen	Terminated	
Oman	Muscat	Muscat International Airport	Terminated	
Pakistan	Karachi	Jinnah International Airport		
Pakistan	Lahore	Allama Iqbal International Airport		
Pakistan	Quetta	Quetta International Airport		
Poland	Warsaw	Warsaw Chopin Airport	Terminated	
Qatar	Doha	Hamad International Airport		
Russia	Moscow	Sheremetyevo International Airport	Terminated	
Russia	Saint Petersburg	Pulkovo Airport	Terminated	
Saudi Arabia	Dammam	King Fahd International Airport		
Saudi Arabia	Jeddah	King Abdulaziz International Airport	Seasonal	
Saudi Arabia	Medina	Prince Mohammad bin Abdulaziz International Airport	Seasonal	
Serbia	Belgrade	Belgrade Nikola Tesla Airport	Terminated	
Singapore	Singapore	Changi Airport	Terminated	
South Korea	Seoul	Incheon International Airport	Terminated	
Spain	Barcelona	Josep Tarradellas Barcelona–El Prat Airport	Terminated	
Spain	Madrid	Madrid–Barajas Airport	Terminated	
Sri Lanka	Colombo	Bandaranaike International Airport	Terminated	
Syria	Damascus	Damascus International Airport	Terminated	
Sweden	Gothenburg	Göteborg Landvetter Airport	Terminated	
Sweden	Malmö	Malmö Airport	Terminated	
Sweden	Stockholm	Stockholm Arlanda Airport	Terminated	
Switzerland	Geneva	Geneva Airport	Terminated	
Tajikistan	Dushanbe	Dushanbe International Airport	Terminated	
Thailand	Bangkok	Suvarnabhumi Airport	Terminated	
Tunisia	Tunis	Tunis–Carthage International Airport	Terminated	
Turkey	Ankara	Ankara Esenboğa Airport	Terminated	
Turkey	Istanbul	Atatürk Airport	Airport Closed	
Turkey	Istanbul	Istanbul Airport		
Turkey	İzmir	İzmir Adnan Menderes Airport	Seasonal	
United Arab Emirates	Dubai	Dubai International Airport		
United Kingdom	London	Heathrow Airport	Suspended	
United Kingdom	Manchester	Manchester Airport	Terminated	
United States	New York City	John F. Kennedy International Airport	Terminated	
Uzbekistan	Tashkent	Tashkent International Airport	Terminated	

=== Hubs ===
Since its establishment, Iran Air has been based in Tehran, the capital city of Iran. Operating all of it flights from Mehrabad Airport, the airline began operating its international flights at Imam Khomeini Airport in 2005. All Iran Air international flights were transferred to Imam Khomeini airport by 2007.

Iran Air also has multiple focus cities across the country including Isfahan, Mashhad, Shiraz, and Tabriz.

=== Pilgrims and Hajj ===
Until 2016, Hajj charter operations formed a major part of Iran Air's annual activities. Every year, tens of thousands of pilgrims flew from major cities in Iran to Jeddah, Saudi Arabia's air gateway to Mecca, to take part in pilgrimage ceremonies. In 2016, due to escalating tensions between Iran and Saudi Arabia, all Hajj flights from Iran were suspended indefinitely. These flights resumed from 2017.

=== Codeshare agreements ===
Iran Air had codeshare agreements with the following airlines:

- Turkish Airlines

== Fleet ==
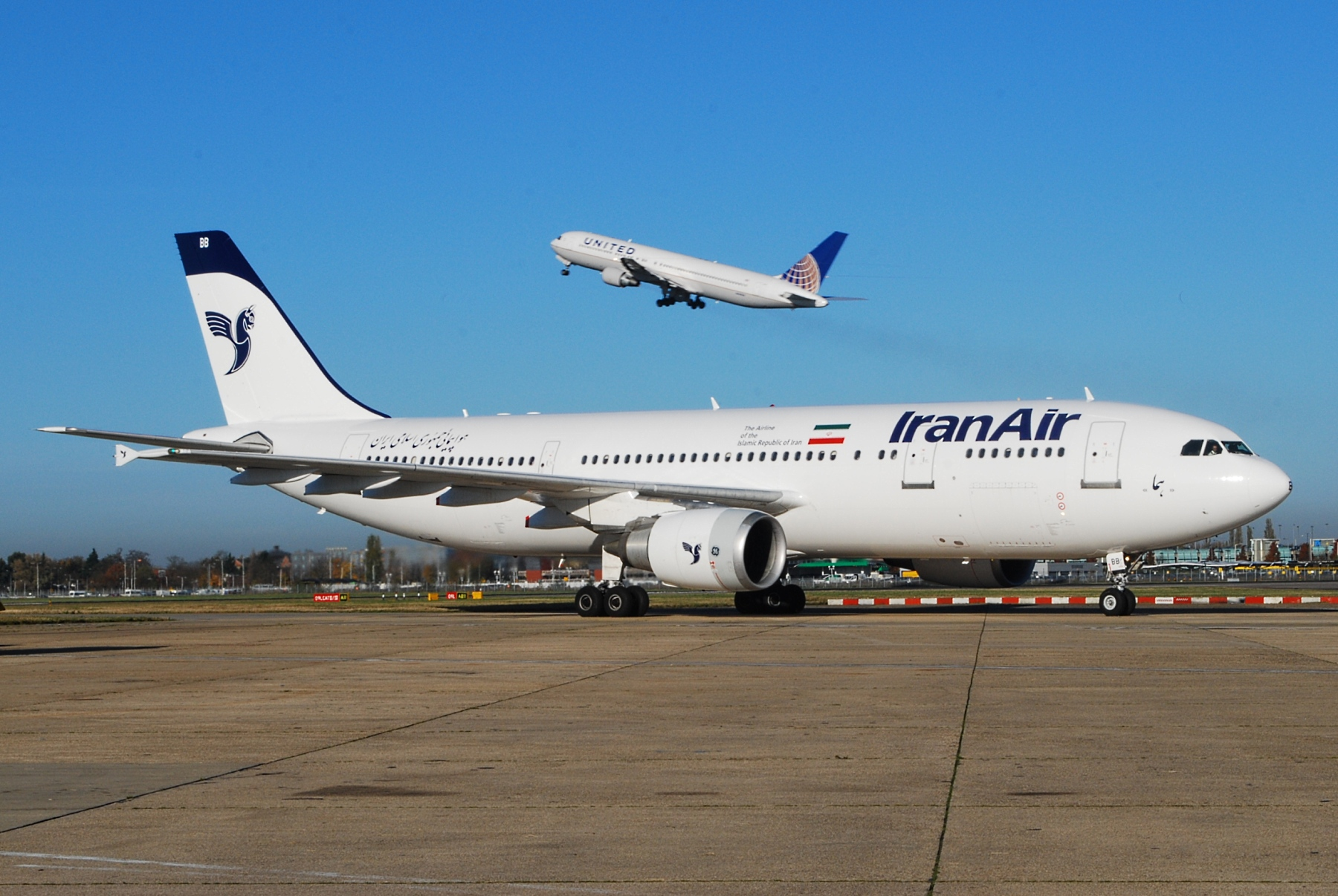
Iran Air Airbus A300-600R

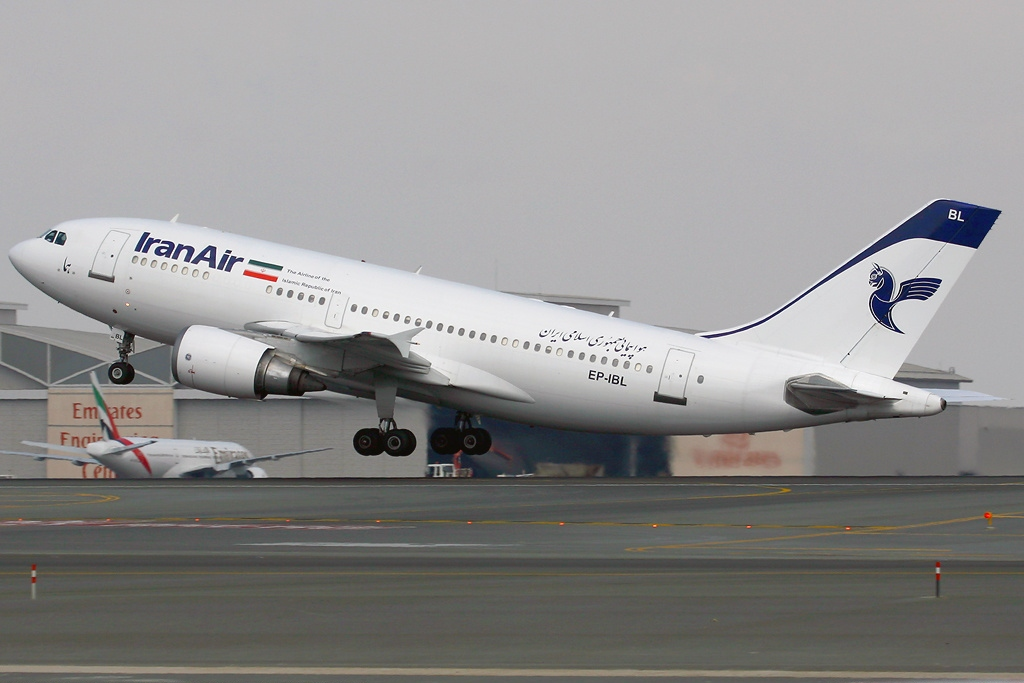
Iran Air Airbus A310-300

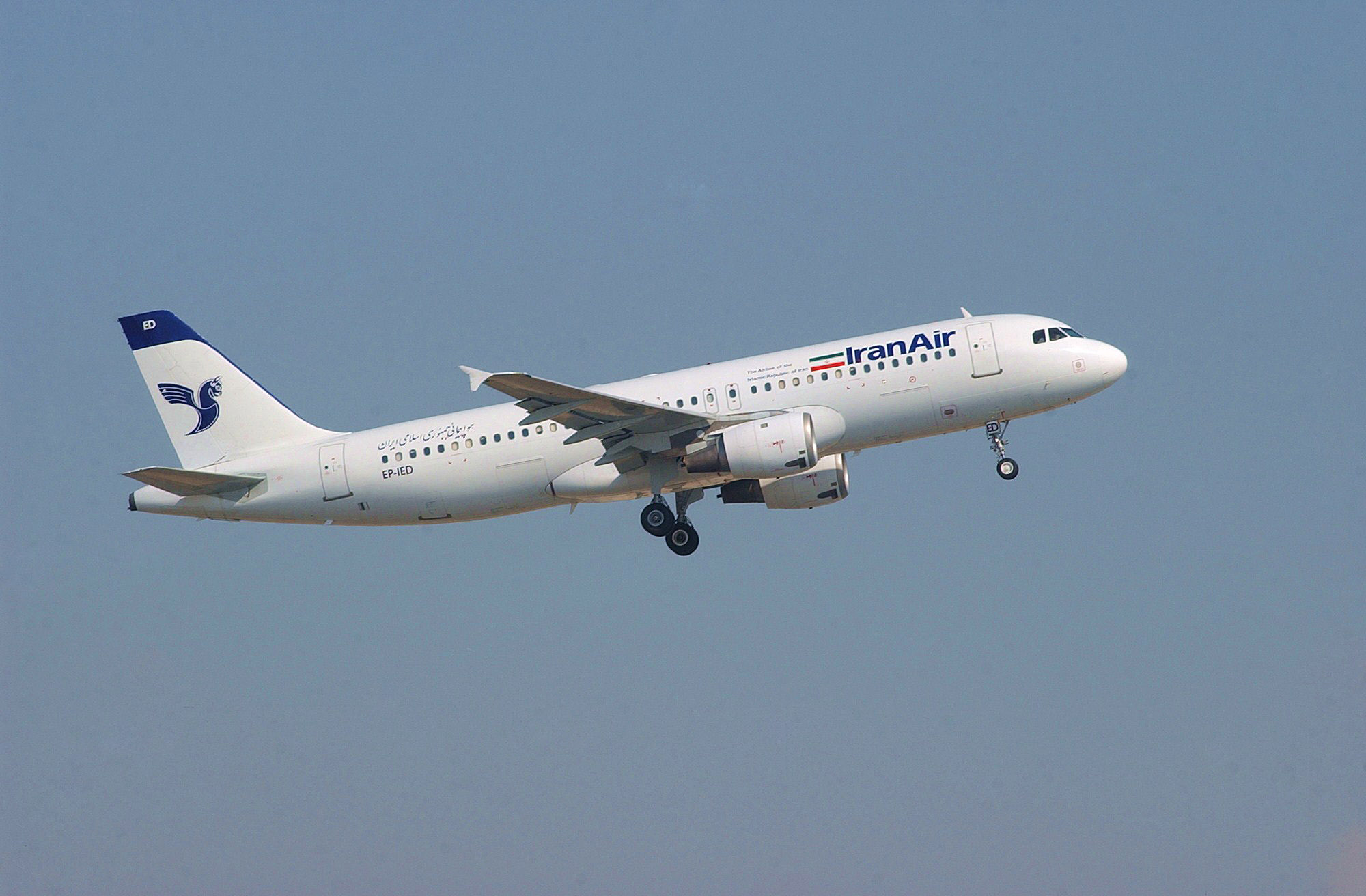
Iran Air Airbus A320-200

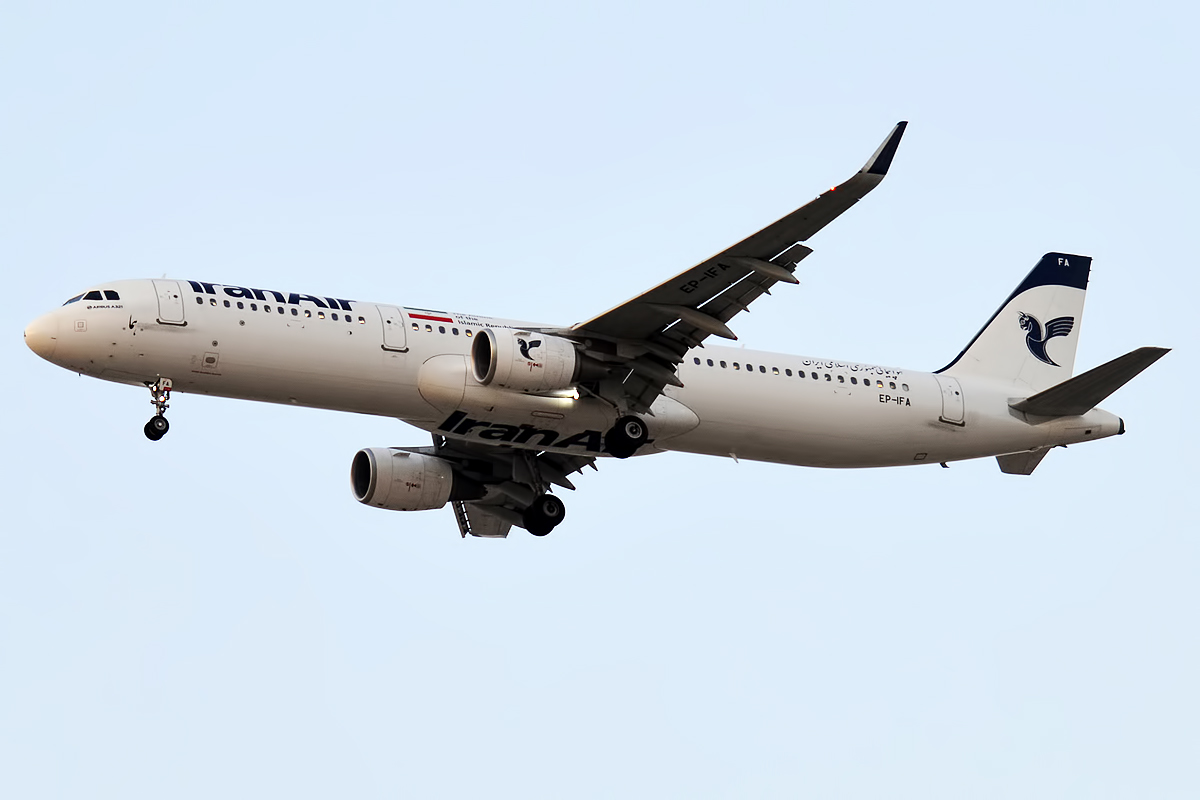
Iran Air Airbus A321-200

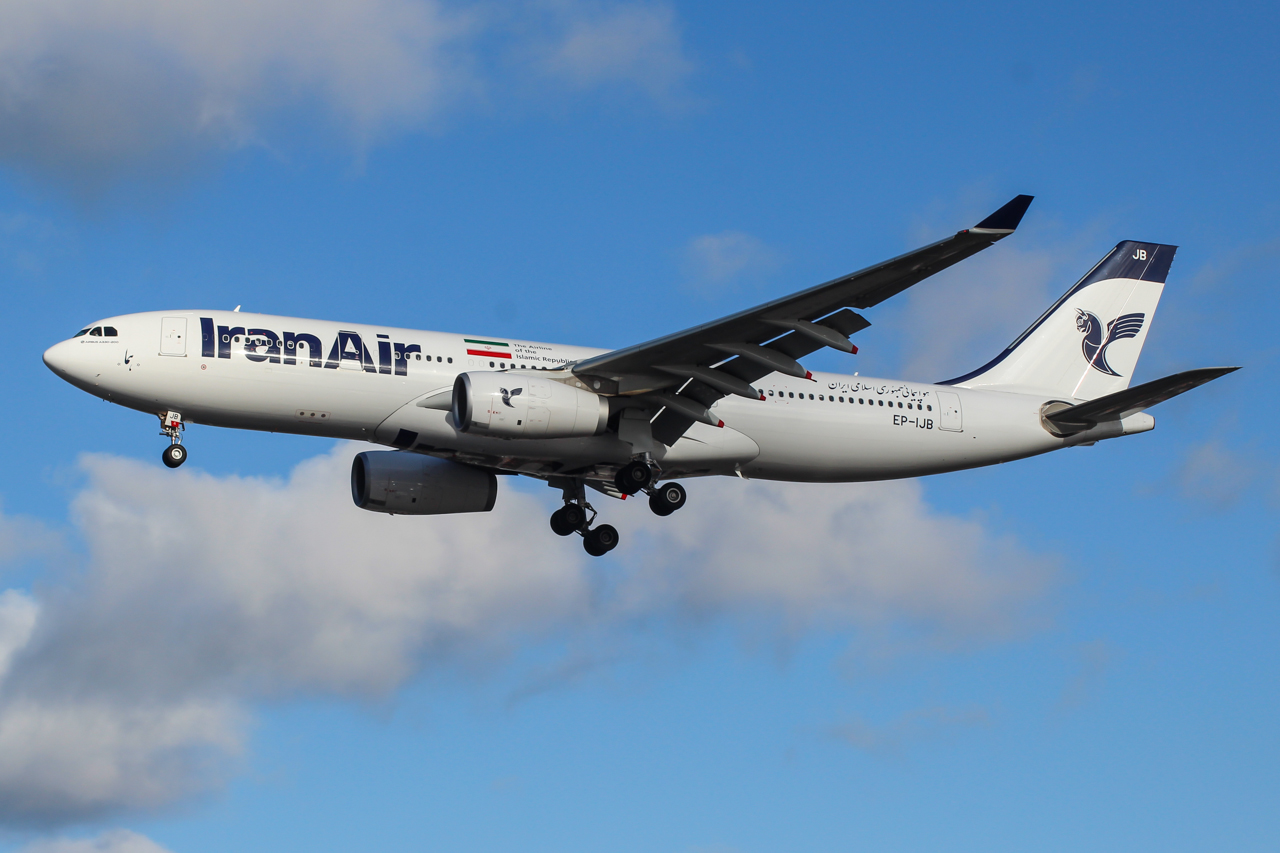
Iran Air Airbus A330-200

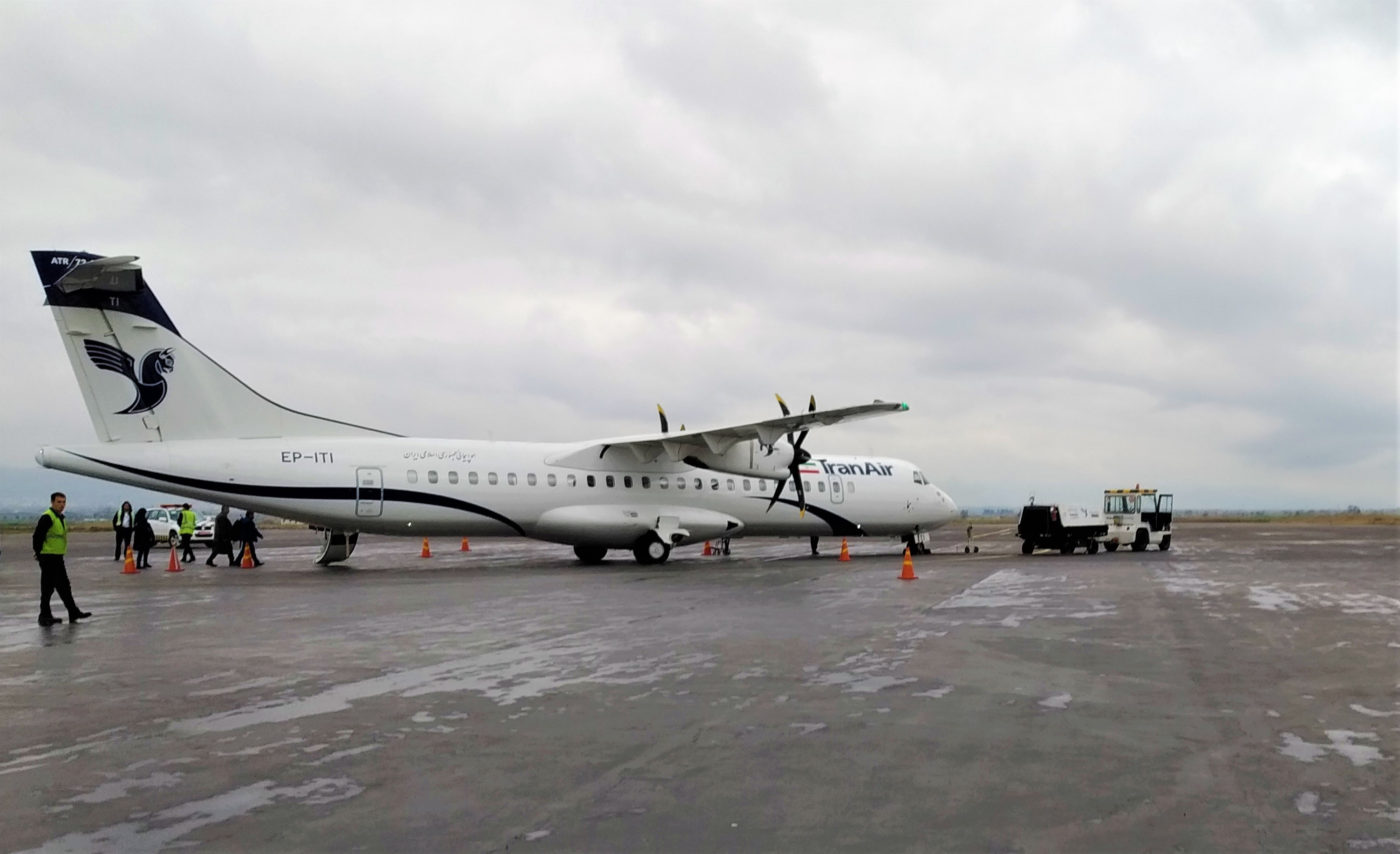
Iran Air ATR 72-600

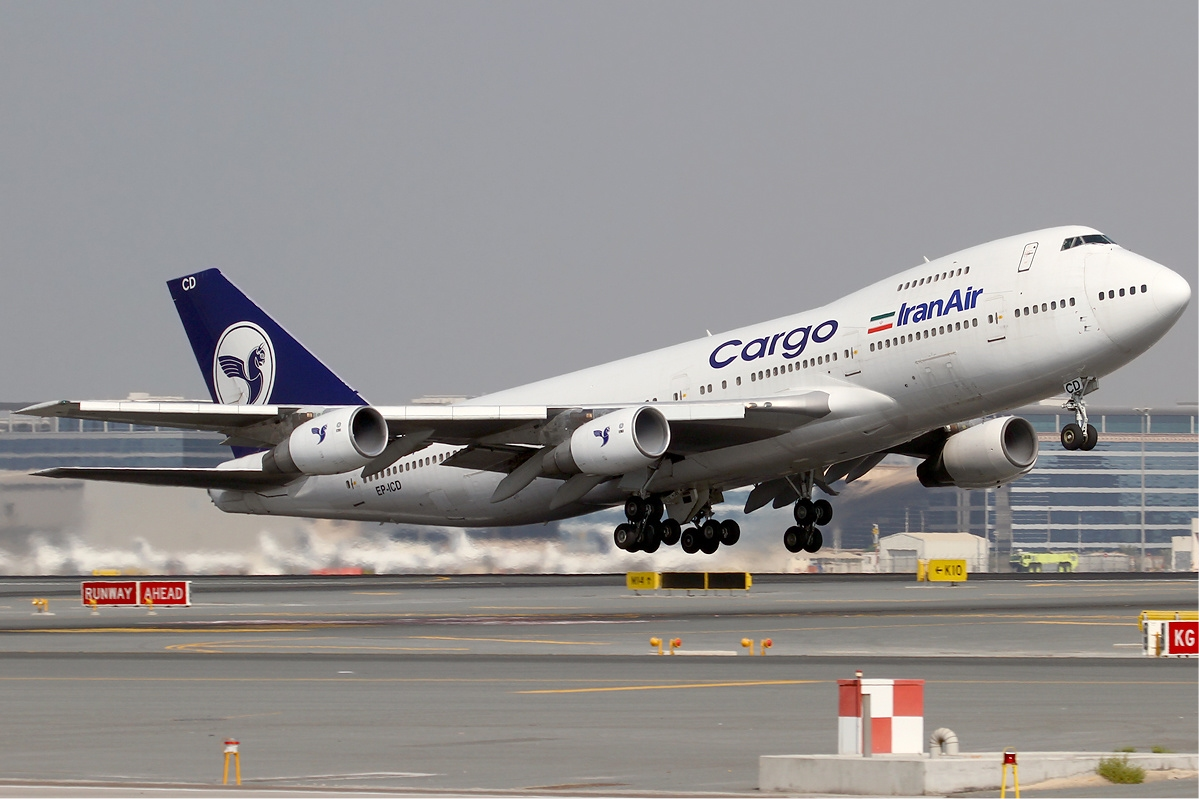
Iran Air Cargo Boeing 747-200C

=== Current fleet ===
As of July 2026, Iran Air operates the following aircraft:

Iran Air fleet
Aircraft	In service	Passengers			Notes
Aircraft	In service	H	E	Total	Notes
Airbus A300-600R	4	22	239	261	
Airbus A310-300	1	14	198	212	
Airbus A319	2	12	108	120	
Airbus A320	2	12	144	156	
Airbus A321	1	12	182	194	
Airbus A330-200	2	32	206	238	
Airbus A330-200	2	18	246	264	
ATR 72-600	13	—	68	68	All parked
Fokker 100	3	—	104	104	
Iran Air Cargo fleet
Boeing 747-200C/SF	1	Cargo			
Total	31				

=== Former fleet ===
Iran Air has previously operated the following aircraft:

Aircraft	Fleet	Introduced	Retired	Notes/Refs
Airbus A300B2-200	7	1980	2019	
Airbus A300B2-200	1	1980	1988	Shot down as flight IR655 by the US Navy.
Airbus A300B4-200	4	2006	2025	
Airbus A300B4-200F	2	2008	Unknown	Aircraft are currently stored.
Airbus A310-200	6	2001	2009	Former Turkish Airlines fleets. 3 aircraft are currently stored.
Airbus A319-100	1	2019	2026	EP-IEP destroyed following airstrikes on Bushehr Airport during 2026 Iran War
Avro York	Unknown	Unknown	Unknown	Operated by Persian Air Services prior to 1962 merger with Iranian Airways.
Beechcraft Model 18	Unknown	Unknown	Unknown	Operated by Iranian Airways prior to 1962 merger with Persian Air Services.
Boeing 707-300	5	1965	2000	Operated by Persian Air Services prior to 1962 merger with Iranian Airways.
Boeing 727-100	3	1965	2006	
Boeing 727-100	1	1965	1980	Crashed as flight IR291.
Boeing 727-200/Adv	5	1974	2014	3 aircraft are currently stored.
Boeing 727-200/Adv	1	1974	2011	Crashed in icing conditions as flight IR277.
Boeing 737-200	6	1971	2004	Stored at Tehran Aerospace Exhibition
Boeing 747-100B	6	1974	2014	EP-IAM is currently stored. 5 aircraft were leased from Pan Am and Cargolux. Iran Air was the first and the last operator of its model.
Boeing 747-100SF	3	1983	1986	Disposed to Iran Air Force. One of these would later be destroyed.
Boeing 747-200B	1	2007	2010	
Boeing 747-200F	4	1980	2004	EP-ICC is preserved. Leased from the Iran Air Force.
Boeing 747-200M	3	1976	2016	EP-IAG and EP-IAI are currently stored.
Boeing 747-400	1	2017	2017	Leased from Kabo Air for Hajj flights.
Boeing 747SP	4	1976	2018	All aircraft are stored. last commercial operator. two are still airworthy.
Convair 240	Unknown	Unknown	1960	Operated by Iranian Airways prior to 1962 merger with Persian Air Services.
de Havilland Dove	Unknown	Unknown	Unknown	Operated by Iranian Airways prior to 1962 merger with Persian Air Services.
de Havilland Dragon Rapide	Unknown	Unknown	Unknown	Operated by Iranian Airways prior to 1962 merger with Persian Air Services.
Douglas DC-3	Unknown	Unknown	1972	Operated by Iranian Airways prior to 1962 merger with Persian Air Services.
Douglas DC-4	Unknown	Unknown	1960	Prior to 1962 merger, passenger versions operated by Iranian Airways, freight versions operated by Persian Air Services.
Douglas DC-6B	Unknown	Unknown	1972	
Douglas DC-7C	Unknown	Unknown	Unknown	Operated by Persian Air Services prior to 1962 merger with Iranian Airways.
Douglas DC-8	1	1976	1977	Leased from Martinair.
McDonnell Douglas DC-9	1	1976	1976	Leased from Martinair.
Lockheed L-749 Constellation	Unknown	Unknown	Unknown	
Vickers Viscount	Unknown	Unknown	1960	

==== Concorde order ====
On 8 October 1972, Iran Air placed an order with British Aircraft Corporation for two Aérospatiale-BAC Concorde supersonic jets plus an option for one, rendering it the last airline to place Concorde orders for commercial use. However, Iran Air – having had briefly chartered one Concorde jet on flights between Tehran and Paris – cancelled these orders in April 1980.

== Former subsidiaries ==
=== Iran Air Tours ===
Iran Air Tours was founded in 1973 as a wholly owned subsidiary of Iran Air, focusing on charter flights and tourism. In 2011, the company was purchased by Hesayar Cooperative Company, itself a subsidiary of the Ministry of Defense and Armed Forces Logistics. However, Hesayar failed to meet its financial commitments and the airline promptly returned to private hands in 2016. The airline will increase the number of flights from Isfahan and Shiraz airports to Kuwait International Airport as of 17 April 2022.

=== Homa Hotel Group ===
Homa Hotel Group was founded in 1979 by the Government of Iran after it completed a nationalization of the hotel industry. As of 2016, it was owned by Iran's Social Security Organization.

== Accidents and incidents ==
=== Overview ===
Before the two companies merged in 1962 to form Iran Air, Iranian Airways and Persian Air Services had several aircraft hull losses. Iranian Airways lost six Douglas DC-3s in crashes and a fire between 1949 and 1959; and one of its Douglas DC-4s was shot down in 1961; while Persian Air Services lost three Avro Yorks in crashes and a maintenance accident between 1955 and 1959. Since 1962, Iran Air has had more than a dozen aircraft hull losses in crashes and the shooting-down of Iran Air Flight 655; the airline has also experienced twenty hijacking incidents on its aircraft.

==== Incidents ====
- On 14 September 1950, an Iranian Airways Douglas DC-3, (registration: EP-AAG), bound for Saudi Arabia, crashed shortly after taking off from Tehran Mehrabad International Airport. The nine people on board, all employees of the airline, were killed.
- On 25 December 1952, an Iranian Airways Douglas DC-3 (registered EP-ACJ) with twenty-one passengers and a crew of four on board crashed while on approach to Tehran airport. There was only one survivor.
- On September 24 1958, a DH.104 of Iranian Airways crashed after a failed aborted takeoff.
- On the evening of 21 January 1980, a Boeing 727-100 operating as Iran Air Flight 291 (registered EP-IRD) hit high ground north of Tehran in a snowstorm during its landing approach to Tehran's Mehrabad Airport, after the pilot failed to follow the correct path to the runway. All 128 passengers and crew on board were killed.
- In 1986, a 737-200 operated by Iran Air (registered EP-IRG) was destroyed by an air-to-ground missile fired by an Iraqi fighter jet attacking the airport while taxiing at Shiraz airport, killing 3 people.
- On 3 July 1988, Iran Air Flight 655, an A300B2-203 (registered EP-IBU) was shot down while flying over the Persian Gulf on its way to Dubai from Bandar Abbas. According to the U.S. version of events, the crew of the United States Navy cruiser USS Vincennes mistook the airliner for an Iranian Air Force Grumman F-14 Tomcat jet fighter and the cruiser shot the airliner down with a missile, killing all 16 crew and 274 passengers. Iran maintains that it was an intentional act of barbarism.
- On 9 June 1996, a Boeing 727-200 (registered EP-IRU) on a pilot training flight landed on its belly at Rasht Airport on its fifteenth touch-and-go landing in a series, after the crew forgot to extend the landing gear. The aircraft slid for more than 2 kilometres (1.2 mi) along the runway; instead of allowing the aircraft to stop, the crew lifted off again and circled the airport to return for a landing with the gear extended. While circling, a fire broke out in the aircraft's rear fuselage, damaging its flight control systems. As the aircraft neared the ground it rolled left, the wing hit the ground, and the aircraft crashed in a field, killing four of the seven crew on board.
- On 2 February 2000, a Lockheed C-130 Hercules owned by the Iranian Air Force lost control and veered off the runway, striking an Airbus A300B2-203 owned by Iran Air, (registered EP-IBR) killing eight people. Both aircraft were written off.
- On 2 January 2008, an Iran Air Fokker 100 (registration: EP-IDB) carrying 100 passengers skidded off the runway after its wing caught fire, when taking off for a domestic flight to Shiraz International Airport from Mehrabad Airport. No one was injured in the accident, which happened amid heavy snowfall at the airport. The aircraft was written off.
- On 9 January 2011, Iran Air Flight 277, a Boeing 727-200 (registration: EP-IRP) originating from Tehran, crashed near its destination city of Orumiyeh, 740 kilometres (460 mi) northwest of Tehran, during an attempted go-around in poor weather. It was carrying 105 people, of whom at least 78 were killed.
- On 18 October 2011, a Boeing 727-200 (registration: EP-IRR) operating a flight from Moscow as Flight 742 landed with the nose landing gear jammed in the retracted position at Mehrabad International Airport. All 113 occupants on board survived without incident.
- On 3 March 2026, an Airbus A319-111 (registration: EP-IEP), was destroyed in an air strike at Bushehr Airport in southern Iran during the 2026 Iran war.

== See also ==
- Airlines of Iran
- Airports of Iran
- Iran Civil Aviation Organization
- Privatization in Iran
- Tourism in Iran
- Transport in Iran
