= List of Iranian Air Force bases =

This page lists bases and airports operated or used by the Islamic Republic of Iran Air Force (IRIAF).

Categories include: (1) Tactical Air Bases (TAB), the 17 major IRIAF operational air bases, (2) Underground tactical air bases having Oghab 44, (3) Other Military Aviation Installations and joint civil/military, installations without TAB designation numbers, and (4) Civil Airports, facilities under civil authority that sources indicate to be of strategic importance to the IRIAF for contingency scenarios, etc.

== Tactical air bases ==
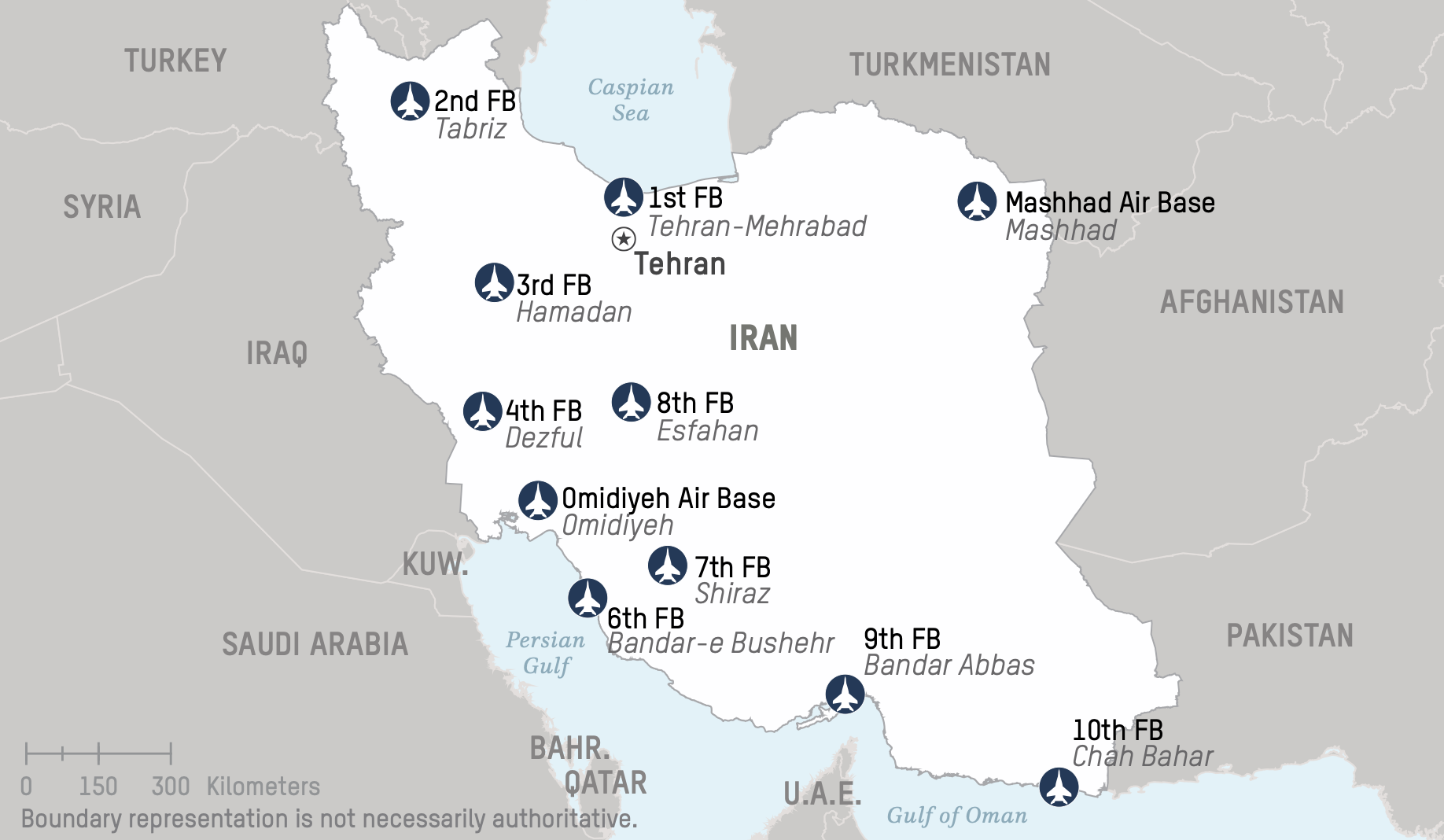
A map of Iranian airbases

- TAB 1 – Mehrabad International Airport – 35°41′19″N 51°18′46″E – F-14s located at this base
- TAB 2 – Tabriz Air Base – 38°07′44″N 46°14′24″E
- TAB 3 – Hamadan Airbase (Shahrokhi Air Base) – 35°12′37″N 48°39′12″E – F-4D/Es reported to serve here, 1990s
- TAB 4 – Vahdati Air Base (Dezful) – 32°25′57″N 48°24′07″E
- TAB 5 – Omidiyeh Air Base – 30°49′51″N 49°32′35″E
- TAB 6 – Bushehr Airport – 28°56′41″N 50°50′04″E – F-4D/Es reported to serve here, 1990s
- TAB 7 – Shiraz International Airport – 29°32′11″N 52°35′18″E
- TAB 8 – Isfahan International Airport – 32°44′49″N 51°51′17″E – F-14 Tomcats based here
- TAB 9 – Bandar Abbas International Airport – 27°13′5″N 56°22′40″E – F-4D/Es and Su-22's based here
- TAB 10 – Chahbahar Air Airport – 25°26′41″N 60°22′55″E
- TAB 11 – Doshan Tappeh Air Base – 35°42′11″N 51°28′31″E
- TAB 12 – Birjand International Airport – 32°53′53″N 59°15′58″E
- TAB 13 – Zahedan International Airport – 29°28′29″N 60°54′22″E
- TAB 14 – Mashhad International Airport – 36°14′07″N 59°38′38″E
- TAB 15 – Kermanshah Airport – 34°21′00.51″N 047°09′53.26″E
- TAB 16 – Kerman Airport – 30°15′57″N 56°57′34″E
- TAB 17 – Shahid Asyaee Airport (Masjed Soleyman) – 31°59′58″N 49°16′16″E

== Underground tactical air bases ==
- Oghab 44 28°03′23″N 55°30′24″E (underground base)

== Former military aviation installations ==
- TAB 00 – Ghale Morghi Air Base (Qaleh Morgi) – 35°38′41″N 51°22′51″E

converted into VELAYAT park

== Other military aviation installations ==
- Ahmadi Military Air Field – 29°05′57″N 51°02′7″E
- Badr Air Base (Sepah Air Base) – 32°37′16″N 51°41′49″E
- Bishe Kola Air Base – 36°39′18″N 52°20′58″E
- Darrahi Military Air Field – 29°22′33″N 51°04′03″E
- Gorreh Military Air Field – 29°54′25″N 50°25′43″E
- Hesa Air Base – 32°55′44″N 51°33′40″E
- Jask Air Field – 25°39′11″N 57°47′51″E
- Kashan Air Base – 33°53′43″N 51°34′37″E
- Kish Island Airport (civil/military) – 26°31′33″N 53°58′52″E
- Kushke Nosrat Airport (Manzariyeh) – 34°59′02″N 50°48′22″E
- Nain Air Base – 32°51′46″N 53°03′36″E
- Naja Air Base – 35°46′34″N 50°52′51″E
- Qezel Qeshl Ag Military Air Field – 39°06′40″N 45°20′02″E
- Shahid Vatan Pour Air Base – 32°34′09″N 51°41′12″E
- Soga Air Base – 37°37′40″N 56°10′23″E
- Urumiyeh Airport (civil/military) – 37°40′15″N 45°04′19″E

== Civil airports ==
- Abadan-Ayatollah Jami International Airport – 30°21′52″N 48°13′52″E
- Abdanan Air Field – 32°56′01″N 47°29′08″E
- Abamusa Island Airport – 25°52′32″N 55°01′58″E
- Aghajari Airport – 30°44′40″N 49°40′38″E
- Ahvaz Airport – 31°20′13″N 48°45′40″E
- Bandar Lengeh Airport – 26°31′53″N 54°49′17″E
- Bastak Airport – 27°12′45″N 54°19′06″E
- Gachsaran Air Field – 30°20′14″N 50°49′41″E
- Gorgan Airport – 36°54′25″N 54°24′16″E
- Ilam Airport – 33°37′33″N 46°25′05″E
- Khanian Air Field – 37°29′00″N 45°55′00″E
- Khark Island Airport – 29°15′32″N 50°19′26″E
- Khorramabad Airport – 33°26′03″N 48°17′03″E
- Noshahr Airport – 36°39′48″N 51°27′53″E
- Parsabad-Moghan Airport – 39°36′17″N 47°52′40″E
- Qazvin Airport – 36°14′23″N 50°02′54″E
- Rasht Airport – 37°19′25″N 49°36′32″E
- Ramsar Airport – 36°54′31″N 50°40′47″E
- Sabzevar Airport – 36°10′05.10″N 057°35′42.66″E
- Sahand Airport (Maragheh) – 37°20′52″N 46°07′34″E
- Shahabad Highway Strip – 34°04′06″N 46°35′56″E
- Yazd Shahid Sadooghi Airport – 31°54′05″N 54°16′51″E

== See also ==
- List of airports in Iran
- Islamic Republic of Iran Air Force
- Military of Iran
- Iranian underground missile bases
