= List of military accidents in Taiwan =

This is a list of military accidents in Taiwan (formally known as the Republic of China), primarily involving the Republic of China Armed Forces and the United States Armed Forces.

Notable people who have died in military accidents in Taiwan include Tsunamasa Shidei, Subhas Chandra Bose, George V. Holloman, Chalermkiat Watanangura, and Shen Yi-ming.

== 1944 ==
On 23 October 1944, a Japanese passenger transport plane crashed into the Taiwan Grand Shrine on Jiantan Mountain shortly after take-off from then Matsuyama Airfield. Many parts of the shrine, including the Torii ceremonial archway and stone toro lanterns, were damaged in the crash.

== 1945 ==
On 18 August 1945 an Imperial Japanese Army Air Service Mitsubishi Ki-21 crashed after takeoff from Taipei resulting in the deaths of four people including Tsunamasa Shidei and Subhas Chandra Bose.

== 1946 ==
On 19 March 1946 Col. George V. Holloman, an aviation-instrument inventor and early experimenter with guided missiles, was killed in a Boeing B-17G-95-DL (44–83779, piloted by Major General James Edmund Parker) accident due to bad weather in Hokusekiko, Taiwan, en route from China to the Philippines. Holloman had received the DFC for conducting the first instrument-only landing of an aircraft. Alamogordo Army Air Base in New Mexico was renamed Holloman AFB on 13 January 1948.

== 1950 ==
On 6 November 1950 a US Navy aircraft with 12 aboard disappeared over the Taiwan Strait.

== 1956 ==
On January 23, 1956, Lts Keith Hanna and Lee Banigan took off from an airbase in Taiwan to practice intercepts in their F-86F Sabres. Tragedy struck, a midair collision occurred and Lee Banigan vanished and remains missing to this day.

== 1957 ==
On 15 February 1957 a Republic of China Air Force patrol plane returning from a mission over the Taiwan Strait crashes into a row of houses southwest of Taipei, killing all nine crewmen and injuring ten civilians.

== 1960 ==
In April 1960 Marshal of the Royal Thai Air Force Chalermkiat Watanangura, his wife and sixteen other individuals were killed when the Royal Thai Air Force C-54 they were flying in crashed into Mount Wu Tse near Taipei after takeoff. Chalermkiat had been in Taipei attending a meeting of air chiefs from anti-communist governments from around the Pacific.

In May a ROCAF North American F-86 Sabre crashed into a neighborhood in Kaohsiung's Zuoying District killing 11 and injuring 45.

== 1961 ==
On 19 March 1961 a Lockheed U-2C crashed at Taoyuan Air Base during a training mission killing Chih Yao Hua.

== 1969 ==
In March 1969 a US Air Force Lockheed C-130 Hercules crashed on Taiwan killing nine and leaving three injured.

On May 16 a Black Cat Squadron Lockheed U-2 crashed due to a technical failure on mission killing Major Chang Hsieh.

== 1970 ==
In October 1970 a US Air Force C-130 Hercules of the 314th Tactical Airlift Wing with 43 people aboard crashed soon after taking off from Taipei International Airport.

On November 24 a Lockheed U-2R crashed at Taoyuan Air Base during a training mission.

== 1973 ==
On 14 August 1973, an American F-4D 66-7606 from the 523d Tactical Fighter Squadron, 405th Fighter Wing ditched into the Taiwan Straits on a ferry flight.

On 16 September 1973, an American F-4C from the 44th Tactical Fighter Squadron crashed in Taiwan. The crew ejected without injury.

== 1974 ==
On 18 January 1974, an F-4D 64-0936 from the 90th Tactical Fighter Squadron, 405th Fighter Wing written off at Ching Chuan Kang AB, Taiwan.

== 1997 ==
A Taiwanese C-130 crashed at Taipei Songshan Airport in 1997.

== 2007 ==
In April, eight people aboard a Bell UH-1H military helicopter were killed in a crash. In May a F-5F fighter crashed into base housing occupied by Singaporean personnel, killing the pilots. Nine Singaporeans on the ground were injured and two were killed.

== 2008 ==
An S-70C Seahawk crash killed one crew member, injured two and left two others missing,

Two pilots were killed after crash-landing their AH-1W Super Cobra attack helicopter in the island's north.

== 2011 ==
A RF-5 surveillance plane and a two-seater F-5F trainer crashed, killing three pilots.

== 2015 ==
In 2015, two United States Marine Corps F/A-18C Hornets made an unscheduled landing at Tainan Airport after one of them developed an engine anomaly in-flight. The aircraft were accommodated in an air force hangar until a Lockheed C-130 Hercules full of American technicians could be flown in to repair the aircraft.

== 2016 ==
On 1 July 2016, a Hsiung Feng III missile was accidentally launched from a Republic of China Navy vessel from waters off Kaohsiung towards Penghu. The missile hit a fishing boat at 8:40 a.m., killing one person and injuring three.

== 2019 ==
In 2019, a Singaporean soldier was seriously injured during nighttime parachute training. He underwent intensive surgery in Taiwan. In 2020 he was flown back to Singapore aboard a Singapore Air Force A330 Multi-Role Tanker Transport.

== 2020 ==
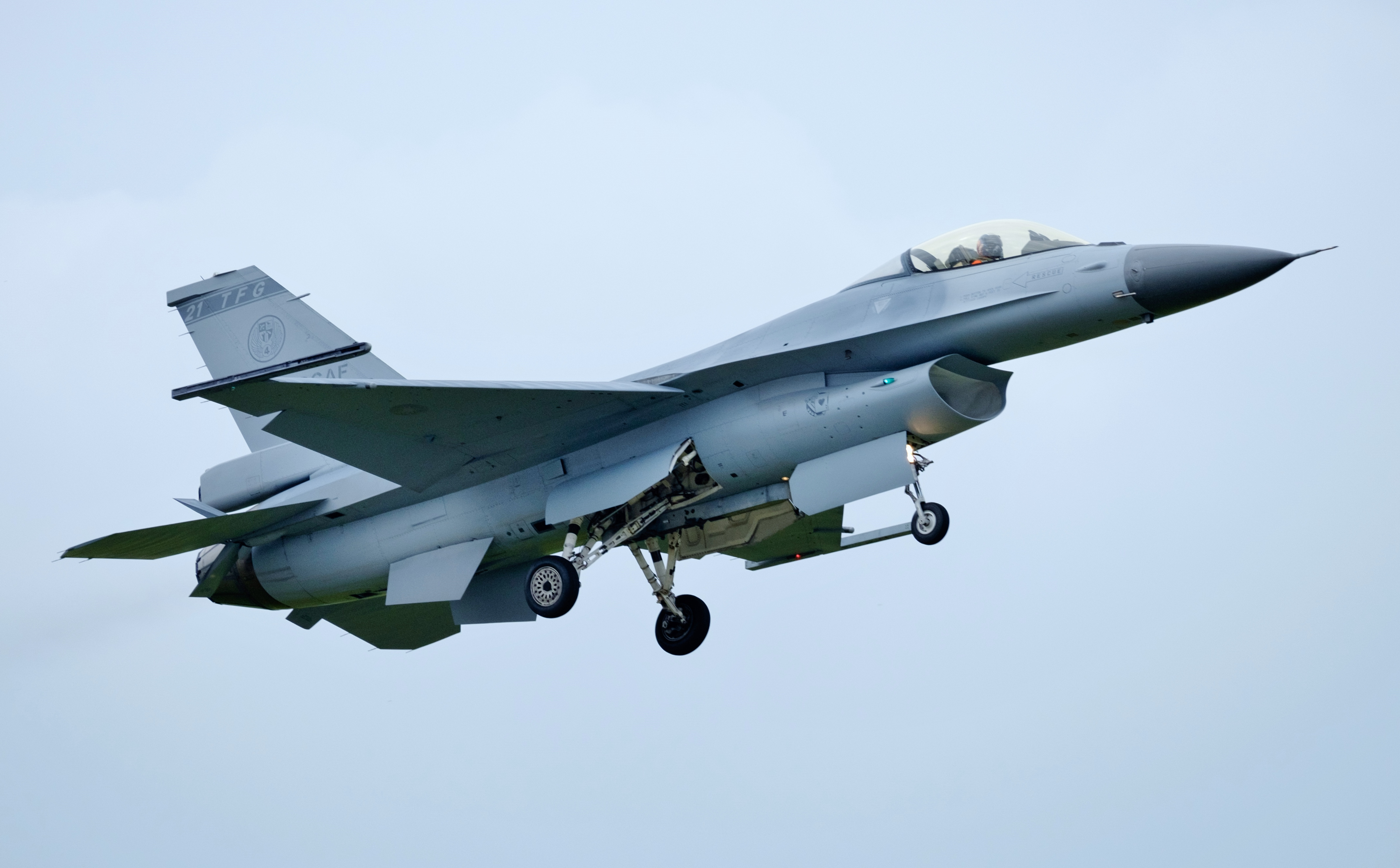
A ROCAF F-16A similar to the one that crashed on 17 November

In January, Taiwan's top military chief Shen Yi-Ming was killed along with eight other senior officers when their Black Hawk helicopter crashed in the mountains near Taipei.

In July, Taiwan's Bell OH-58 Kiowa helicopter fleet was grounded after a crash at Hsinchu Air Force base, killing the two pilots. Also in July two marines died after their small boat capsized during amphibious training operations.

In October, a F-5 fighter jet crashed and its pilot was killed after it plunged into the sea several hundred meters (a half-mile) off the coast of Taitung County.

In November, a F-16 fighter jet crashed minutes after takeoff from Hualien Air Base.

In December, a hiker on a coastal trail on Shoushan in Kaohsiung was injured by a stray bullet believed to have originated from an offshore firing range.

== 2021 ==
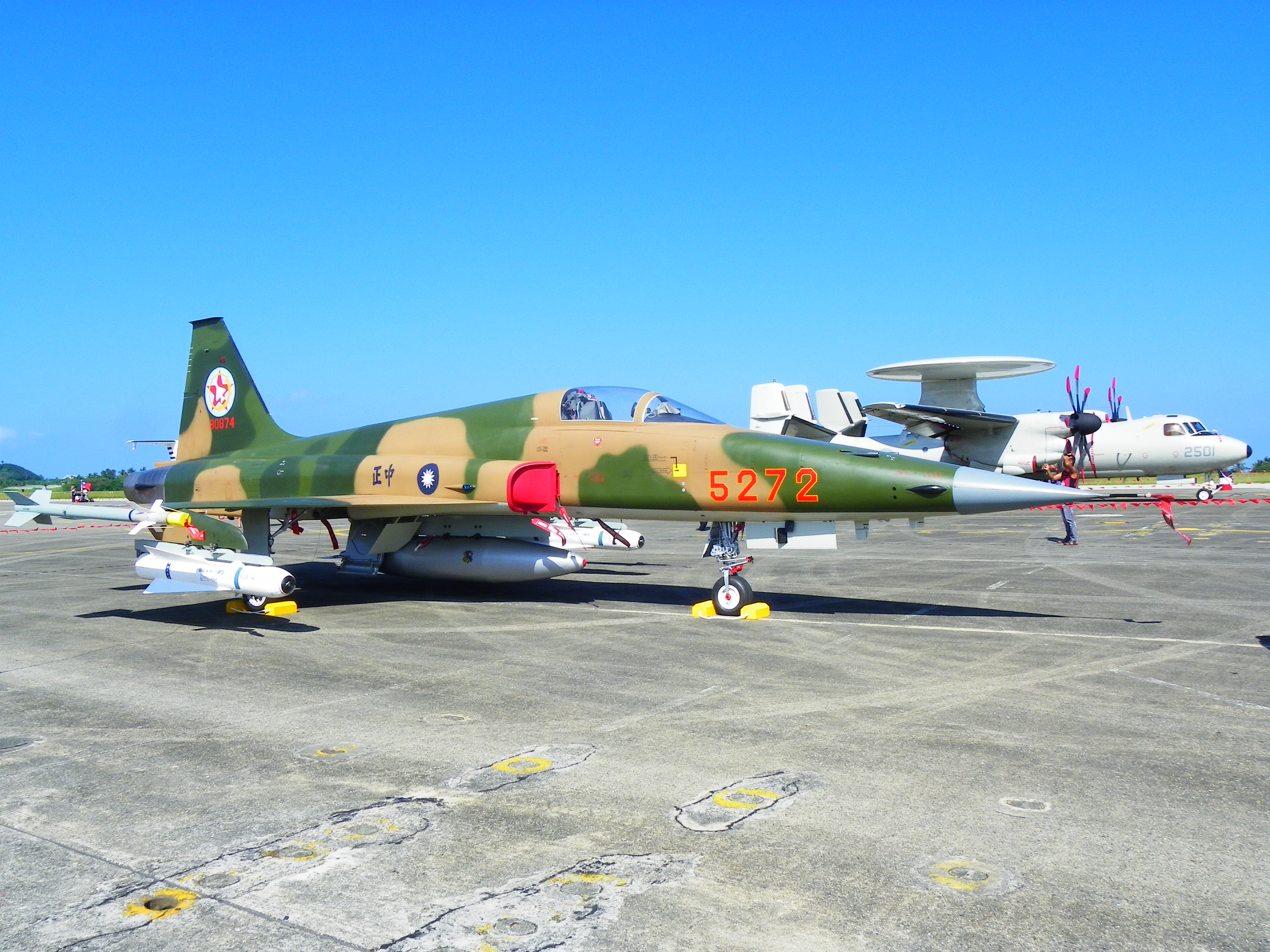
An F-5E fighter similar to the one that crashed on 22 March

Two F-5 fighter jets crashed into the sea near the southeastern coast in an apparent collision, resulting in two deaths. The air force later grounded all F-5s and suspended all training missions, after concerns were raised about both training and maintenance.

In February one prototype of the first generation NCSIST Teng Yun crashed in Taitung Forest Park during a test flight.

== 2022 ==
In January, a F-16 fighter jet crashed into the sea while taking part in training exercises. Combat training for Taiwan's F-16 fleet was suspended in the aftermath of the crash.

On 14 March, a Dassault Mirage 2000 fighter jet crashed into the sea after a mechanical problem while on a training mission from Chihhang Air Base.

In May, a AIDC AT-3 training aircraft crashed minutes after taking off from the southern port city of Kaohsiung during a training mission. The air force halted all academy training flights as President Tsai Ing-wen ordered an investigation into the cause of the incident.

In June, a Taiwanese Sikorsky S-70C(M) crashed, leaving four injured.

== 2024 ==
A Taiwanese Dassault Mirage 2000 crashed during a training exercise on 10 September 2024; the pilot ejected safely.

== 2025 ==
An AIDC T-5 Brave Eagle crashed in February 2025, the pilot survived with minimal injuries.

In June 2025 a master sergeant died after being ingested by an engine on an AIDC F-CK-1 Ching-kuo at Ching Chuan Kang Air Base.

== 2026 ==
On January 6, a F-16 fighter jet of the ROCAF crashed off the coast of Hualien County. The location of the black box of the F-16 was found on January 15 but the pilot remains missing.

On June 2, a T-34 Mentor of the ROCAF crashed at Ganshang Air Force Base, Gangshan District, killing the two pilots on board.
