= GZW =

GZW may refer to:

- Qazvin Airport (IATA: GZW), an airport in Qazvin, Iran
- Upper Silesian Coal Basin (Górnośląskie Zagłębie Węglowe, GZW), a coal basin in Silesia, in Poland and the Czech Republic
