= Buochs Airport =

Buochs Airport Flugplatz Buochs
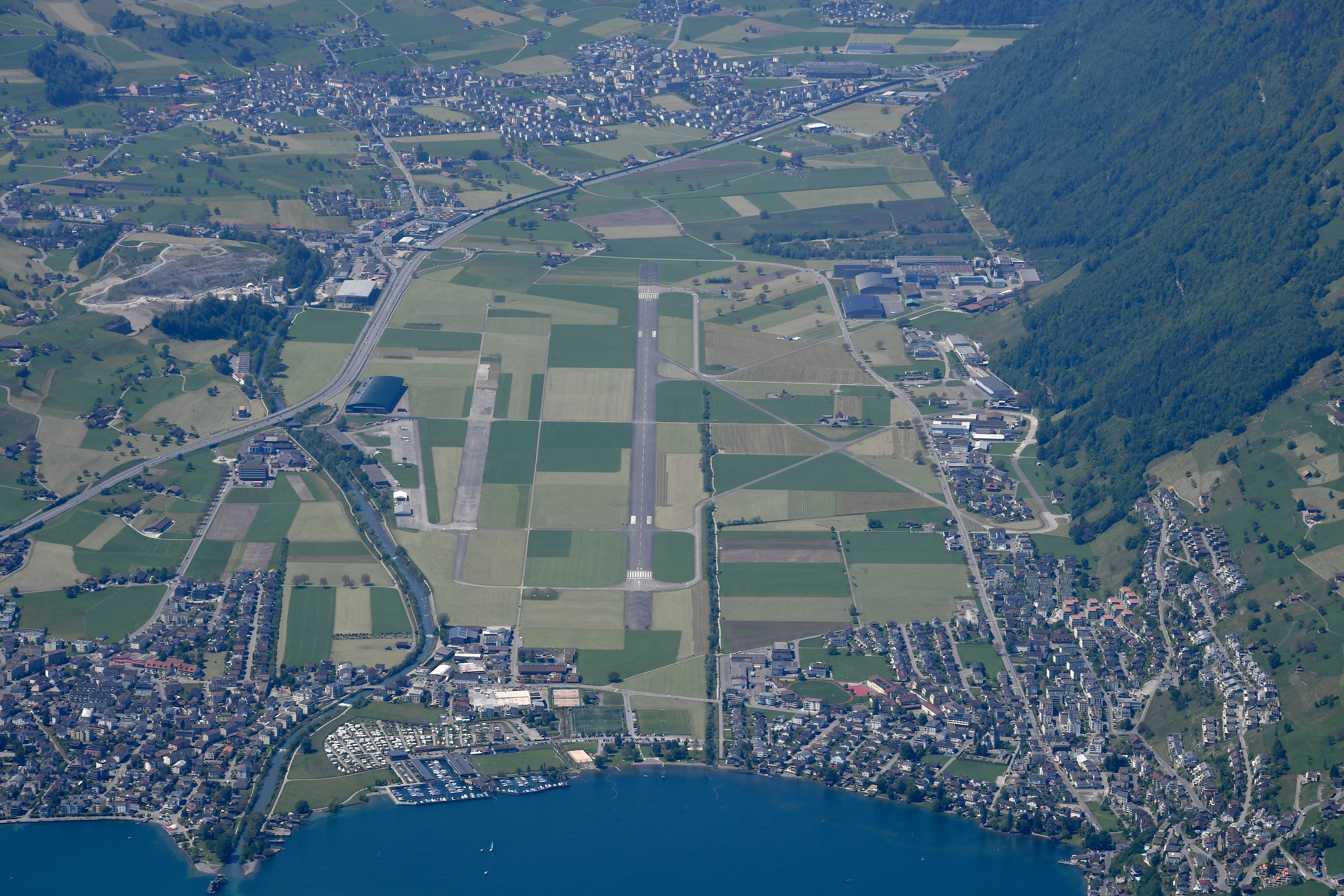
- Aerial image of the Buochs airport
- IATA: BXO; ICAO: LSZC / LSMU

Summary
- Airport type: Military and civil
- Serves: Buochs
- Occupants: Swiss Air Force; Pilatus Aircraft
- Elevation AMSL: 1,475 ft (450 m)
- Coordinates: 46°58′28″N 8°23′49″E

Map
- Location in Switzerland

Runways
Direction	Length		Surface
Direction	ft	m	Surface
06/24	6,561	2,000	Concrete

The Buochs Airport (Note: German: Flughafen Buochs, French: Aéroport de Buochs, Italian: Aeroporto di Buochs) (IATA code BXO) (ICAO code LSZC Mil: LSMU) is a regional airport in the town of Buochs in the canton of Nidwalden in Switzerland. Its facilities include a concrete runway with a length of 2000 meters and a width of 40 meters, several taxiways, and hangars.

== Operation ==
The airfield is formally the responsibility of the Swiss Air Force, but is operated by the Civil Airport Buochs AG. Since 1 January 2004, the Buochs airport is a "sleeping base" of the Air Force. In case of an extraordinary situation, the entire military infrastructure of the airfield can be made operational again. However, there are considerations that the military withdraws completely from the airfield.

== Use ==
Next to the aircraft cavern, near the airport, are the factory premises of Pilatus Aircraft who currently use the airfield including for test and delivery flights.

== History ==
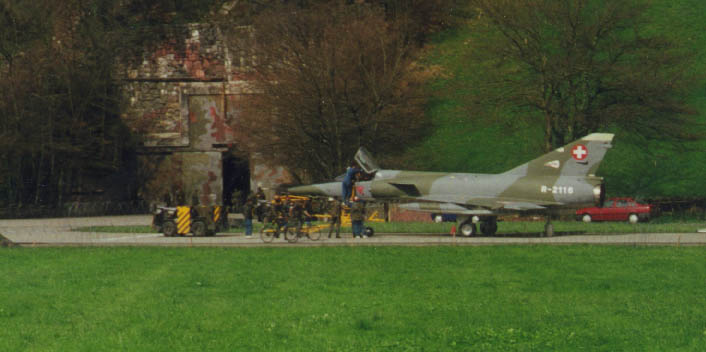
Mirage in front of cavern door

Aircraft most used by the Swiss Air Force in Buochs comprise of different variants of the Dassault Mirage III, and the Northrop F-5E. Also, Pilatus, an aircraft manufacturer, have used this airfield for test and delivery flights for such products as the Pilatus P-3, Pilatus PC-7, Pilatus PC-8D Twin Porter, Pilatus PC-9, Pilatus PC-12 and Pilatus PC-21.

Buochs Airport is equipped with an aircraft cavern (underground hangar). The A2 motorway was built so that Dassault Mirage III aircraft using JATO booster rockets could take off from this highway. However, such capabilities were never used. The air base is, at both ends of the runway, equipped with retractable arresting gear devices (used by the F/A-18 and in case of a problem by the F-5).

The airfield was active as a Swiss Air Force facility until 2003. It was the home of military Squadron 8 who flew Northrop F-5E aircraft, along with the reconnaissance Squadron 10 with Mirage IIIRS. With the end of Buochs as active military airfield and the MirageIIIRS pass out of service, 2 MirageIIIRS received about a special painting in black and white. The in the 1999 decommissioning Mirage IIIS were turned to a hardstand at Buochs Airport for several years until their scrapping. Also often Pilatus PC-6, PC-7, Alouette III, Super Puma, Mirage IIIDS were used from Buochs, rarely was its use as alternate airport for F/A-18 . With the exercise "REVITA" in spring 2014 Buochs was activated by the Air Command Meiringen for 4 days and there were missions with F-5E and F/A-18 flown from Buochs.

The airfield is also used for special occasions, such as the "Iheimisch" trade show. Nidwaldner the trader was held there in May 2012 and in September of the same year, the 4th Air Show Swiss Aero Expo In July 2010, the 35th World Championship of the Army paratroopers took place in the square, parallel to this, a big concert with Bonnie Tyler was held. On 1 August 2014, the Airshow PC-7 Team has for the first time officially, the show flown with smoke generators on the airfield Buochs. The reason for this event was the Swiss National Day, the 25th anniversary of the PC-7 Team and the roll-out of the Pilatus PC-24. The Modellfluggruppe Nidwalden (MGN) uses the airfield.

== See also ==
- Military significance of Switzerlands Motorways
- Pilatus Aircraft
- RUAG
