= Aircraft cavern =

Underground hangar used by the Swiss Air Force

Aircraft cavern, a calque of the German word Flugzeugkaverne, is an underground hangar amongst others used by the Swiss Air Force.

== Historical ==
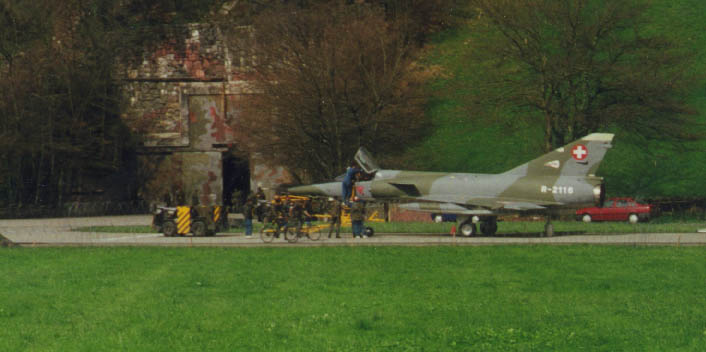
A Mirage III RS in front of an aircraft cavern in Buochs airfield, Switzerland

During World War II, the neutral Swiss military airfields were equipped with simple arched concrete U-43 type shelters to protect the aircraft parked underneath. After World War II, starting in 1947, these open objects became even better protected with metal doors, thus creating the U-68 type shelter.

In the 1940s, the Swiss army had already built so-called retablierstollen (re-equipping tunnels) at some airfields. These retablierstollen consisted of 100m long straight tunnels excavated in the rock, making it possible to store and eventually re-arm small Swiss fighter aircraft such as the then used Messerschmitt Bf 109 and the Morane-Saulnier M.S.406. The airfields with such facilities were Alpnach, Buochs, Meiringen, St.Stephan and Saanen, all located in the Alps.

In the early 1950s, the first large-scale excavations in rock took place, creating more space in the existing tunnels. The expanded space created by these excavations was now used to service the aircraft and to execute some minor repairs. The first large-scale but still simple constructions inside the tunnels were at the airfield of Ambrì. These were followed by Alpnach, Buochs, Meiringen, Raron and Turtmann in a more sophisticated manner, starting operations from 1951 to 1954.

Later the installations were further modernized and extended. Underground command and communication posts were constructed together with ammunition and fuel storage facilities, generator and technical rooms to keep the facility running, as well as personnel quarters.

The cavernes have been used to shelter and service the following aircraft types:

- de Havilland DH 100 Vampire
- de Havilland DH 112 Venom
- Hawker Hunter F Mk 58
- Dassault Mirage IIIS / RS
- Northrop F-5E Tiger II
- McDonnell Douglas F/A-18C Hornet (Meiringen only)

== Design and construction ==
A Swiss cavern has space to hold 22 F-5 Tiger aircraft. The outside door usually consists of composite material, steel with a wooden core. Past the door is an S-shaped tunnel leading to the main blast doors. The blast doors are made of concrete reinforced steel and as long as they are closed, the aircraft parking area remains fully CBRN protected.

There are two or more tunnels. The first tunnel provides space for eleven aircraft and is equipped to handle major overhauls such as engine replacements. The aircraft are moved by lifting them by cranes. Once they are lifted, they can be moved through the whole length of the tunnel. There is a linking tunnel to the weapon storage area (WSA) which is extra protected by a sealed door. In case of fire the weapon storage may be filled with inert Halon gas to prevent fire and explosions. The WSA not only holds the munitions needed to re-arm the aircraft (missiles and cannon shells) but also the small arms ammunition for all military working in the cavern.

On the opposite side of the WSA is the command facility holding the workshops to service all aircraft systems, the communications cell, briefing room, kitchen, food & water storage, mess, personnel quarters and no-break generators to maintain electrical power under all circumstances. The command facility is also protected by hermetically sealed doors when working under CBRN conditions.

Next to the command tunnel is another tunnel with the same dimensions as the first one, also capable of holding eleven aircraft.

Fuel storage is located behind all tunnels allowing the cavern to sustain 22 aircraft for about 10 days without re-supplying of electricity, fuel, ammunition etc. from the outside world.

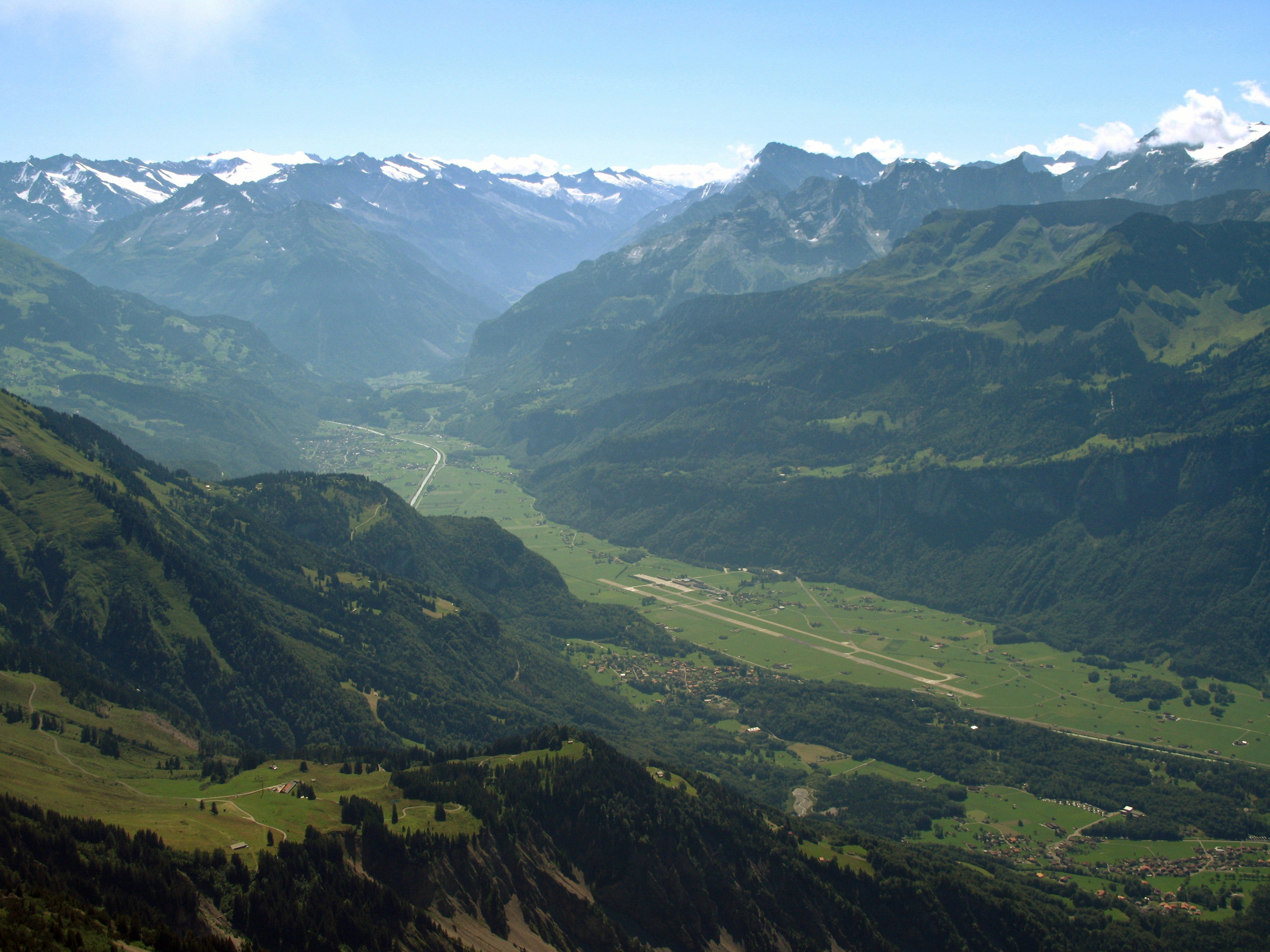
Meiringen Air Base viewed from the Rothorn - note the taxiways leading to the rock face

== Operational use ==
Meiringen Air Base is now the only airfield with fully operational cavernes. The cavern at Meiringen was extended and refurbished for about 120 million Swiss Francs to comply to the needs of the current Swiss airforce F/A-18 fighters. Instead of the earlier crane handling an extra tunnel connects both caverns and their additional dispersals allowing to operate 22 F/A-18s. A linking tunnel constructed directly before the main blast doors allows to refuel and rearm an aircraft immediately after its mission without opening the main blast doors.

The former cavernes at Alpnach, Ambrì, Raron and Turtmann have been deactivated and closed. The caverne at Buochs Airport has been mothballed but it is estimated that the facility could be reactivated to operate F-5's within two months.

== Origin ==
The idea of using roads as runways, known as highway strips, was later part of the design demands for the Swiss motorway network.

== Other countries ==
Other countries that have aircraft shelters built inside mountains on their territory include Albania, Bosnia and Herzegovina, Croatia, the People's Republic of China, Italy, Serbia, Montenegro, Norway, North Korea, Iran and Sweden.

== See also ==
- Index of aviation articles
- Underground hangar

== Sources and references ==
- Aeronautica / Flugwehr - und - Technik/ mag.1969.
- Brochure 2010 Militärische Denkmäler im Bereich Luftwaffe.
- Jubilee book 50 Jahre Flugplatz Meiringen
- www.zone-interdite.net/
- Uno Zero Zero – Ein Jahrhundert Schweizer Luftwaffe. Aeropublications, Teufen/ZH 2013, ISBN 978-3-9524239-0-5
- Book 25 Jahre Fliegerbrigade 32 . Fl Br32 1990.
