= Underground hangar =

Military aircraft hangar

External images
- Aircraft cavern
- M113 in Cavern Turtmann
- F-5E in Cavern
- Hawker Hunter in Cavern
- Patrouille Suisse F-5E in Cavern
- F/A-18 and F-5 Cavern Meiringen

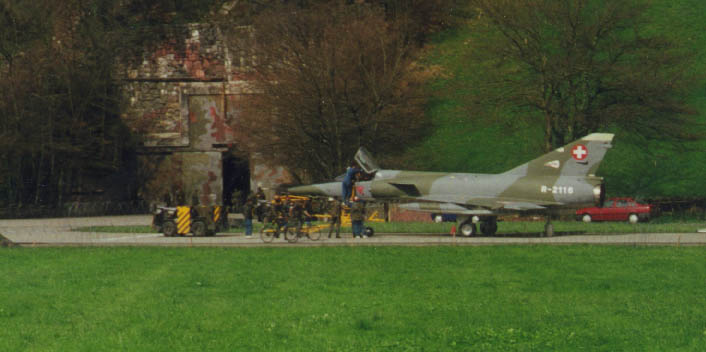
A Mirage IIIRS in front of an aircraft cavern in Buochs Airport, Switzerland

An underground hangar is a type of hangar for military aircraft, usually dug into the side of a mountain for protection. It is bigger and more protected than a hardened aircraft shelter (HAS).

An underground hangar complex may include tunnels containing the normal elements of a military air base—fuel storage, weapon storage, rooms for maintaining the aircraft systems, a communications center, briefing rooms, a kitchen, dining rooms, sleeping areas, and generators for electrical power.

Countries that have used underground hangars include Albania, China, Italy, North Korea, Norway, Sweden, Switzerland, Taiwan, Yugoslavia, Iran, Vietnam, South Africa, and Pakistan.

== By country ==
=== Albania ===
Underground hangar at Kuçovë Aerodrome near Perondi.

Underground hangar at Gjadër Aerodrome.

=== Iran ===
In 2023, Iran unveiled a large underground base called "Eagle 44": in this base, Iran's upgraded F-4 Phantom fighters were present under Shahid Doran. Also, pictures and replicas of the Su-35 were seen at that base. This base, where Iranian drones are also present, is probably somewhere in the south of Iran. While broadcasting a video of another base, on the other side of which Su-24 Fencer aircraft with +2000 km range are stationed, Iran announced that it has more underground bases that will be unveiled in the future.

=== Israel ===
Eight Israeli air force F-16I Sufa fighter aircraft were damaged in the winter of early 2020 by flooding when they were improperly left inside underground hangars in a Negev desert airbase during severe flooding. The Washington Post reported in 2012 based on the results FOIA requests to the US government that the US Army Corps of Engineers brought in US construction contractors to build installations in the south of Israel including underground hangars for fighter-bombers as a part of US military aid to Israel.

=== Italy ===
Built in World War II on the Island of Pantelleria at Pantelleria Airport.

=== North Korea ===
There are at least twenty major airfields with underground hangars in North Korea, including Onchon air base, Kang Da Ri Airport and Sunchon Airport.

=== Norway ===
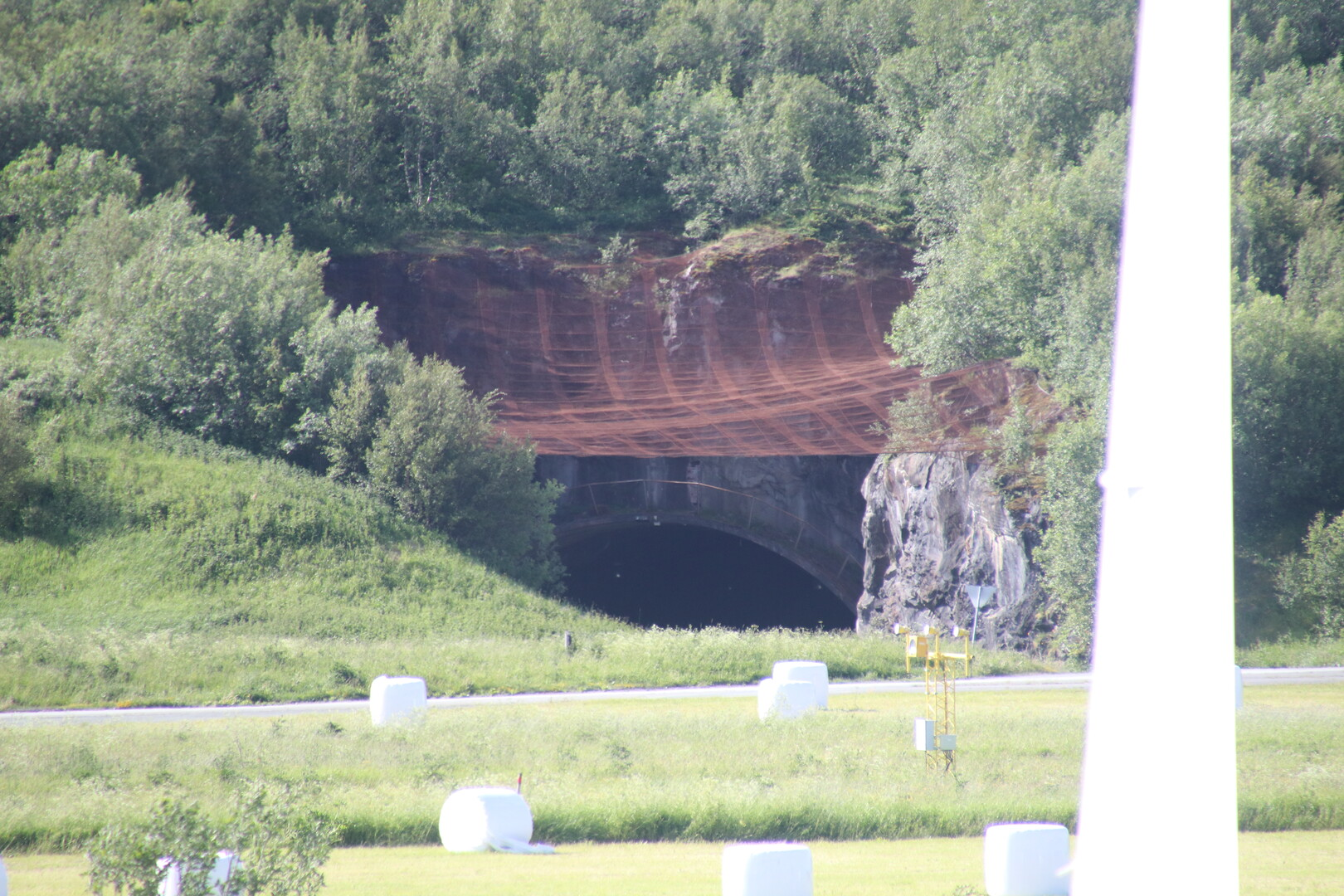
Underground hangar portal at Bodø.

Underground hangars were built in Bodø Main Air Station and Bardufoss Air Station.

=== Sweden ===
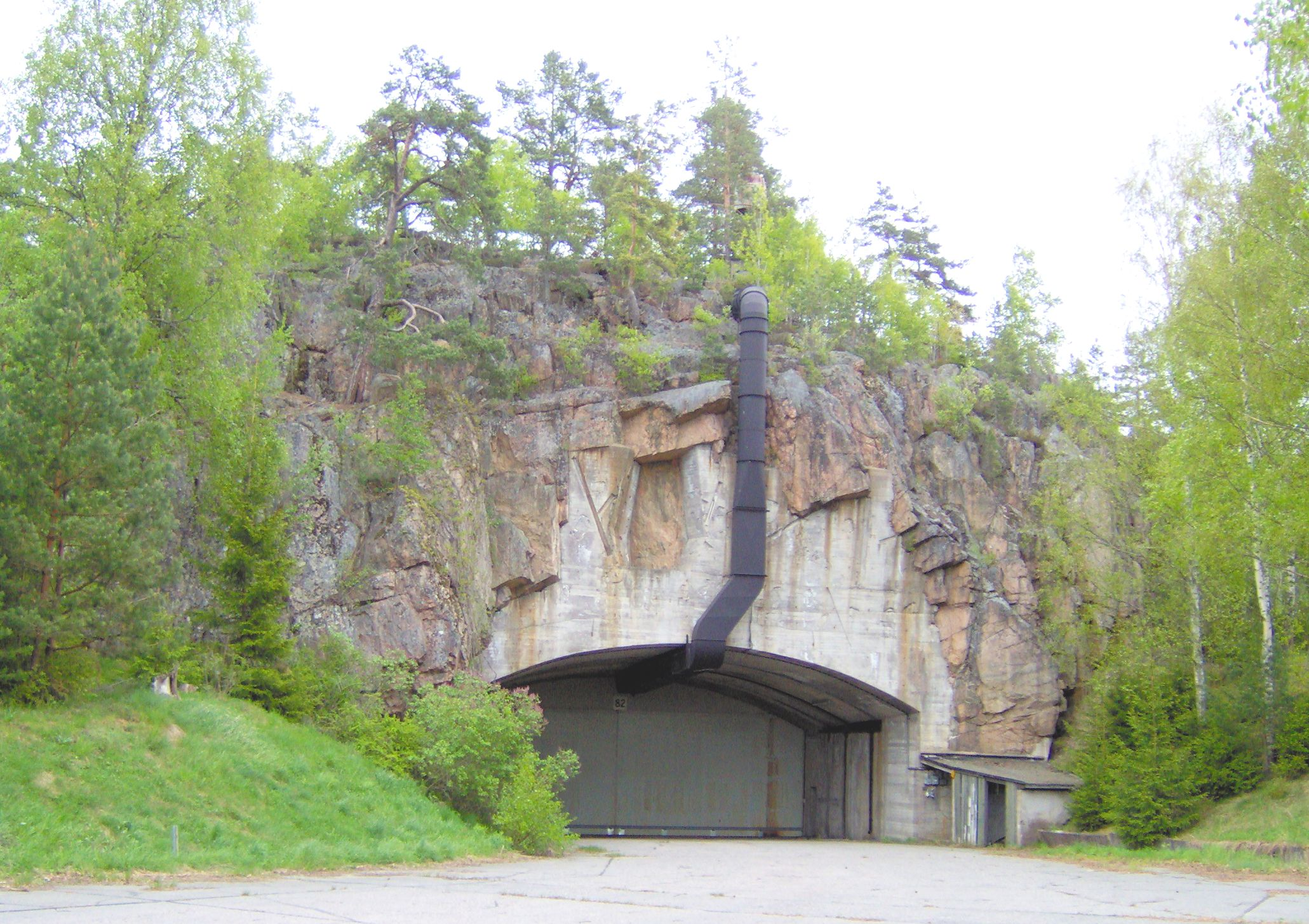
Sweden

In 1941 the Swedish Air Force began building its first underground hangar at Göta Wing (F 9), located near Gothenburg in south-west Sweden, it was commissioned in 1944. After World War II plans were made up for building underground hangars at every air force base that had suitable rock conditions. These ambitious building plans proved too expensive and were reduced to hangars at select air bases. A second underground hangar was built in 1947 at Södertörn Wing (F 18). After that plans were finalized for building underground hangars capable of surviving close hits by tactical nuclear weapons. This required that these new hangars be much deeper, with 25 to 30 meters of rock cover, and heavy-duty blast doors in concrete. The Saab 37 Viggen aircraft was designed with a folding tail fin to fit into low hangars. Aeroseum, an aircraft museum open to the public in Gothenborg, is housed in the larger Cold War-era Underground Hangar at Säve.

=== Switzerland ===
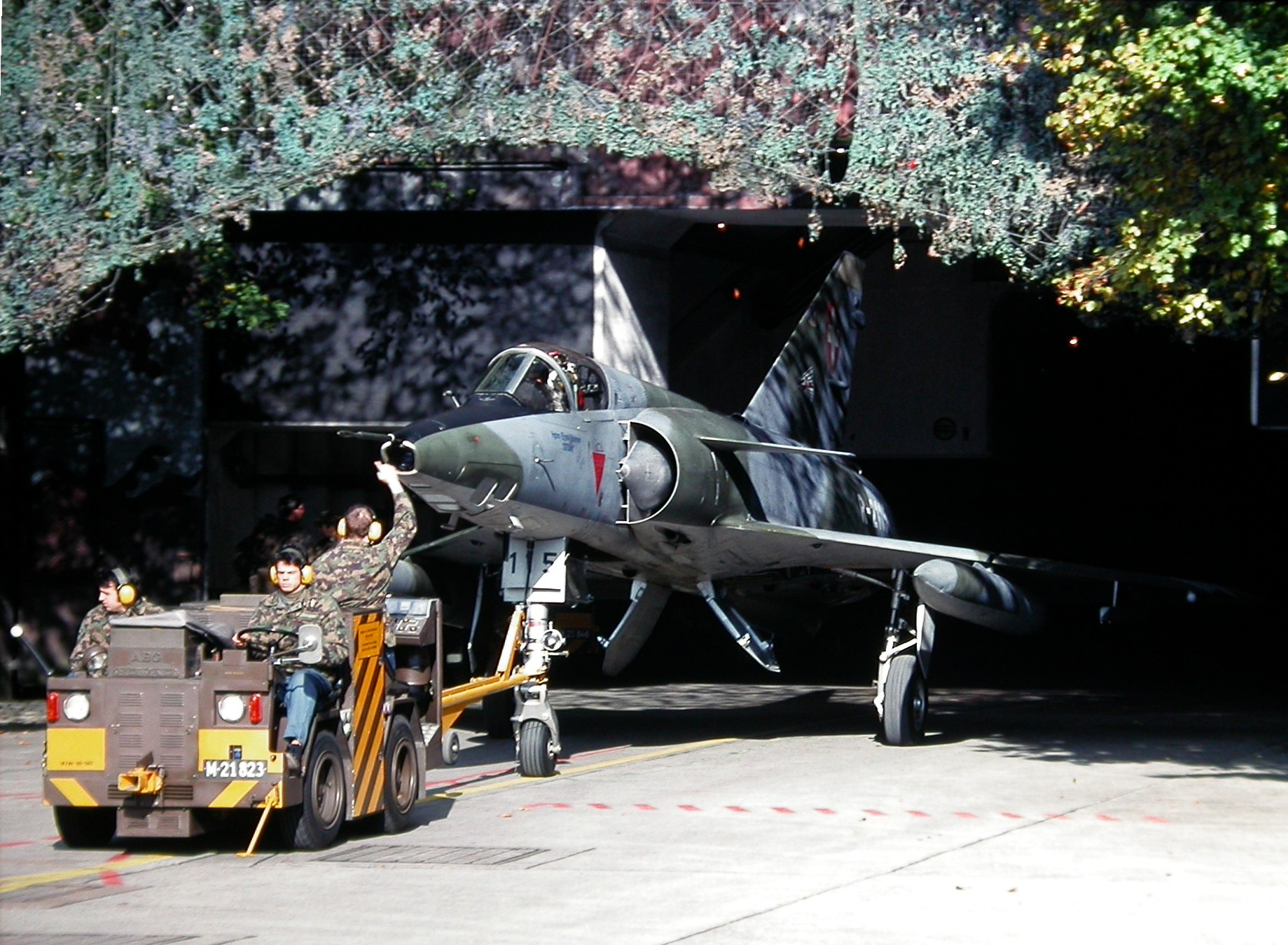
A Mirage IIIRS being towed out of a cavern on Buochs Airport, Switzerland (1999)

Six Flugzeugkaverne (aircraft caverns), each with space for 30 or more aircraft, were constructed for the Swiss Air Force. One at Meiringen Air Base has been expanded to operate F/A-18 Hornet aircraft. Originally, the plan for the aircraft hangar (German Kavernenflugplatz) included the possibility of launching combat aircraft from the mountain air base. High costs and technical difficulties prevented these plans from being realized. The idea of using roads as runways was later part of the design demands for the Swiss motorway network.

=== Taiwan ===
Chiashan Air Force Base, located in Hualien, has an extensive underground hangar system that can accommodate two hundred aircraft.

Chihhang Air Base in Taitung County can accommodate eighty aircraft in underground hangars.

=== Former Yugoslavia ===
==== "Object 505", code name "Klek" ====
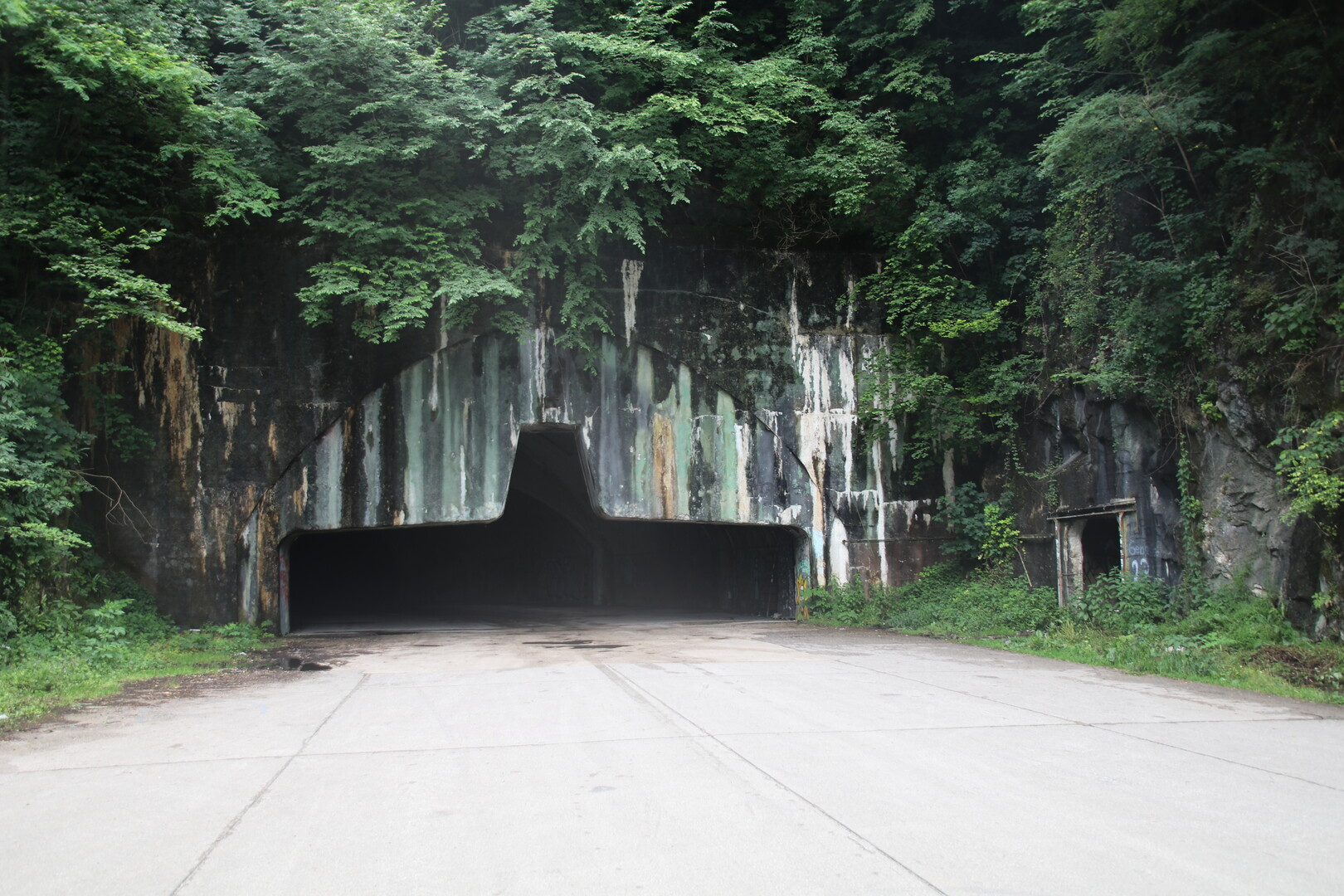
One of five main portals at Objekat 505, Željava.

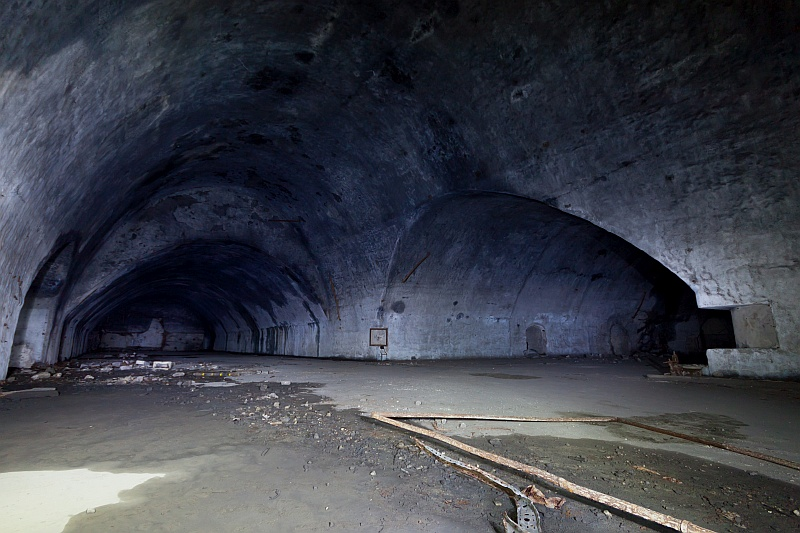
Large underground room used as mechanic workshop.

The "Object 505", code named "Klek", at Željava Airport near Bihać, located on the border between Bosnia and Herzegovina and Croatia, is now derelict underground complex which served as military air base and the air-force hangar. It was built between 1958 and 1968 by the Ministry of defence of Socialist Federal Republic of Yugoslavia (SFRJ) as a series of military installations in secluded but strategically important areas at the border between two constituent Socialist Federal Republics of former SFR Yugoslavia, Bosnia-Herzegovina and Croatia. It was the largest military underground base and the hangar complex in former Yugoslavia, and one of the largest in Europe, with enough space for 80 MiG-21s and 3000 personnel. There was an intercept and surveillance radar facility, code name "Celopek", at the top of the nearby mountain Gola Plješevica (1648 m).

During the Yugoslav Wars, most of the complex was used by the Serbian forces in certain operations. Still, toward the end of the war and due to operations conducted by the joint forces of the Army of Bosnia and Herzegovina and the Croatian Armed forces, Serbs were forced to withdraw. In the process of withdrawal, they destroyed facilities that were later rendered useless for any purpose, including military use. Nowadays, they are popular for urban exploration, which is risky due to the possibility of anti-personnel landmines being located in unexplored areas.

==== Other facilities in former Yugoslavia ====
Object "Morava" at Slatina Air Base (42.571°N 21.007°E), located at Pristina International Airport. The second largest underground hangar complex in Yugoslavia.

Object "Buna" at Mostar International Airport (43.293°N 17.847°E). Built in 1969-1971.

Object "Cetina" near Split Airport (43.532°N 16.277°E). Built in 1969-1970.

Object "Šipčanik" at Podgorica Airbase near Podgorica (1946-1992 Titograd) (42.375°N 19.32°E). Today, a wine cellar.

== See also ==
- Aircraft cavern
- Highway strip
- Satellite airfield
