= Ghale Morghi Air Base =

Former military installation in Tehran, Iran

Ghale Morghi Air Base
- District 19, southwest Tehran in Iran
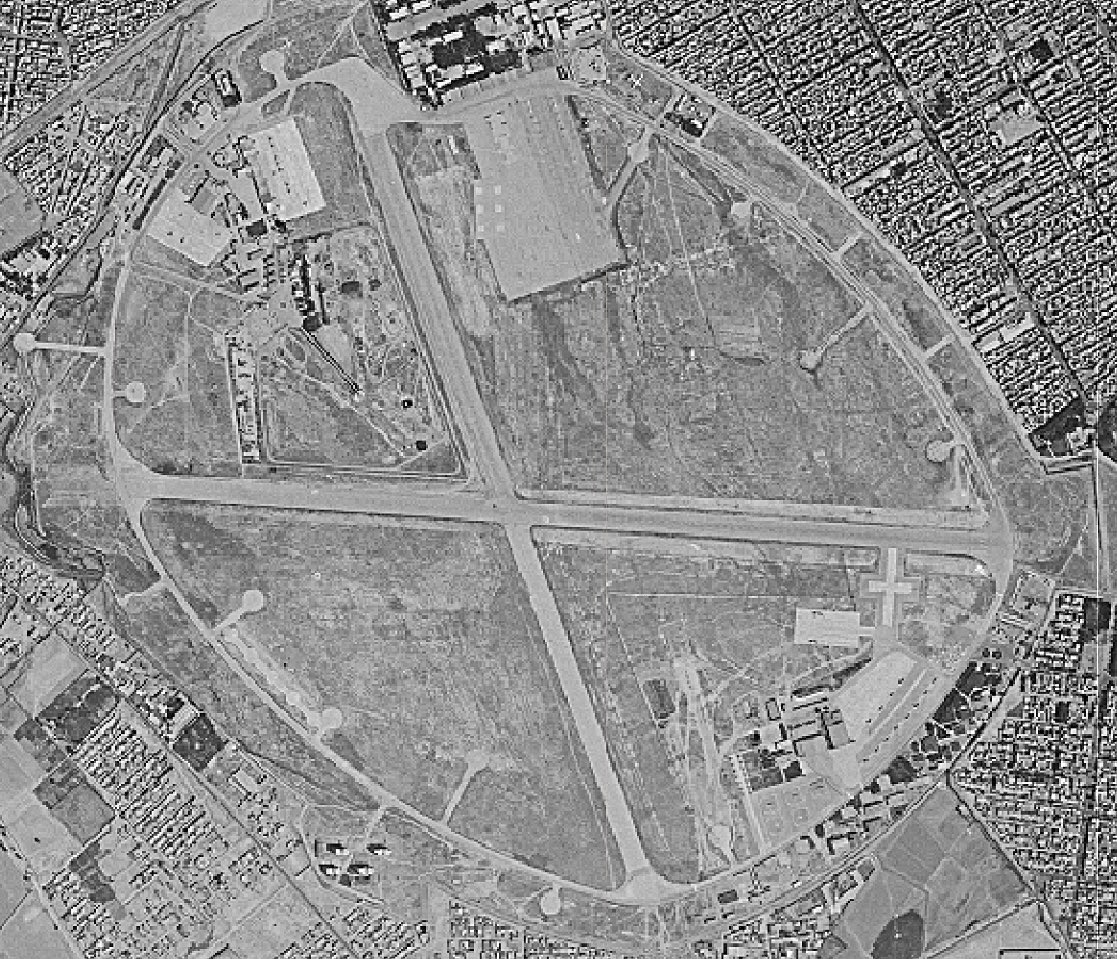
- Aerial imagery depicting Ghale Morghi Air Base captured by KH-9 on 24 June 1978.

Site information
- Code: Tactical Air Base 11 (TAB 11)
- Owner: Islamic Republic of Iran Army
- Operator: Islamic Republic of Iran Air Force

Location
- Location in Iran
- Coordinates: 35°38′41″N 51°22′51″E

Site history
- Built: 1923
- In use: 2011
- Fate: Redevelopment

Airfield information
- Identifiers: ICAO: OIIG
- Elevation: 1,113 metres (3,652 ft) AMSL

Ghale Morghi Air Base (Persian: پایگاه هوایی قلعه‌مرغی) (ICAO: OIIG) was a military installation located in District 19 of southwestern Tehran, Iran. Inaugurated on 30 July 1923, it was the earliest airport in Iran and served as the birthplace of the Imperial Iranian Air Force (IIAF). After World War II, it served as the principal training base for the IIAF and, after 1979, the Islamic Republic of Iran Air Force. In 2011, it was closed and converted into the Velayat Park, though minimal redevelopment has been made, and its original runways were retained.

== History ==
In 1922, an Air Office was established in the Iranian Army Headquarters when the then Prime Minister Reza Khan prospected a military air arm. Afterwards, a Junkers F-13 was bought and flown in by a German pilot on behalf of the Army. Before aerodromes existed across Iran, aircraft flying into Tehran utilised improvised landing areas, most of which were open agricultural fields. Located in southwest of central Tehran, Ghale Morghi was one of those, and on 30 July 1923, it was inaugurated as the first aerodrome in Iran. The establishment of a second aerodrome soon followed, located west of Tehran in Doshan-Tapeh. A second aircraft—an Aero A-30 army co-operation biplane—was purchased from subscriptions raised by the Guilan and Austrabad Brigade. To house newly acquired aircraft, a tent and hangar made of matting was installed. In the summer of 1924, the Iranian Imperial Air Force (IIAF) was officially established, having its main base at Ghale Morghi Air Base. Colonel Ahmad Khan Nakhjavan, one of Iran's earliest trained pilots, returned from training in France and arrived at Ghale Morghi on 25 February 1925.

In September 1932, training commenced for IIAF pilots aboard in the United Kingdom. Further collaboration was made between 1933 and 1935, when the IIAF began acquiring British aircraft to modernise and further develop their structure. By 1936, the IIAF established four Air Regiments to operate as the first-line strength. The 1st Air Regiment was based at Ghale Morghi Air Base, comprising one fighter squadron equipped with Hawker Furies and two lighter bomber squadrons equipped with De Havilland Tiger Moths and Hawker Harts.

=== World War II ===
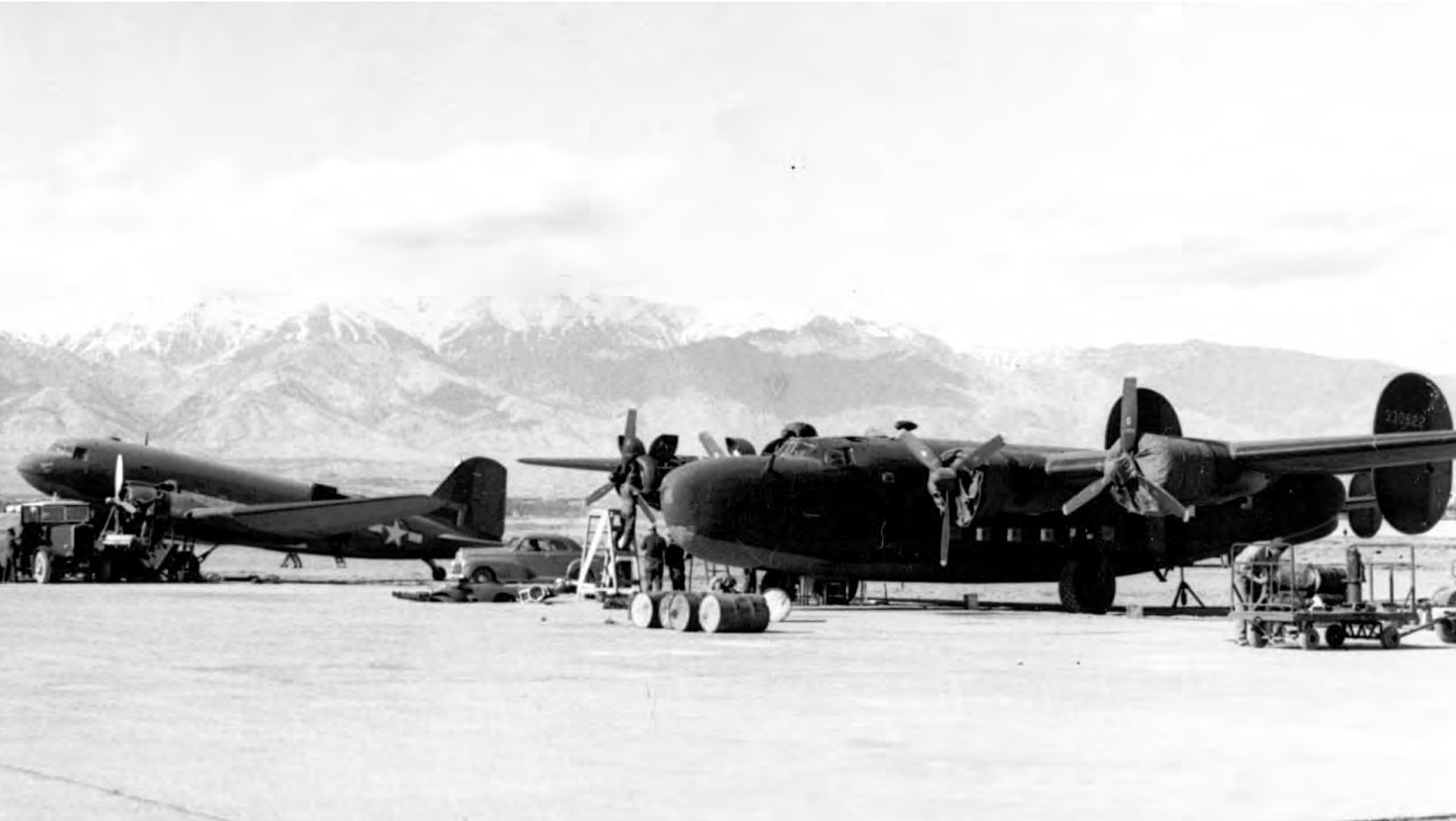
Douglas DC-47 of the Air Transport Command at Ghale Morghi Airfield, 1940s.

In August 1941, Iranian neutrality ended during the Anglo-Soviet invasion of Iran, resulting in the Soviet occupation of Ghale Morghi Air Base. Afterwards, most aircraft were dismantled and personnel from the Iranian airforce were dismissed, and Allied forces were permitted to operate at the airfield. The United States Army Air Forces Air Transport Command began operating from the airfield, and upgrades were done including the development of a temporary terminal, repairs for an existing hangar, installation of runway lights, along with other improvements. The Persian Gulf Command provided facilities and administrative services for the ATC. Other additions included swimming pools and air-conditioning apparatus to benefit stationed personnel. In September 1945, Allied forces vacated the airfield except for intourist personnel.

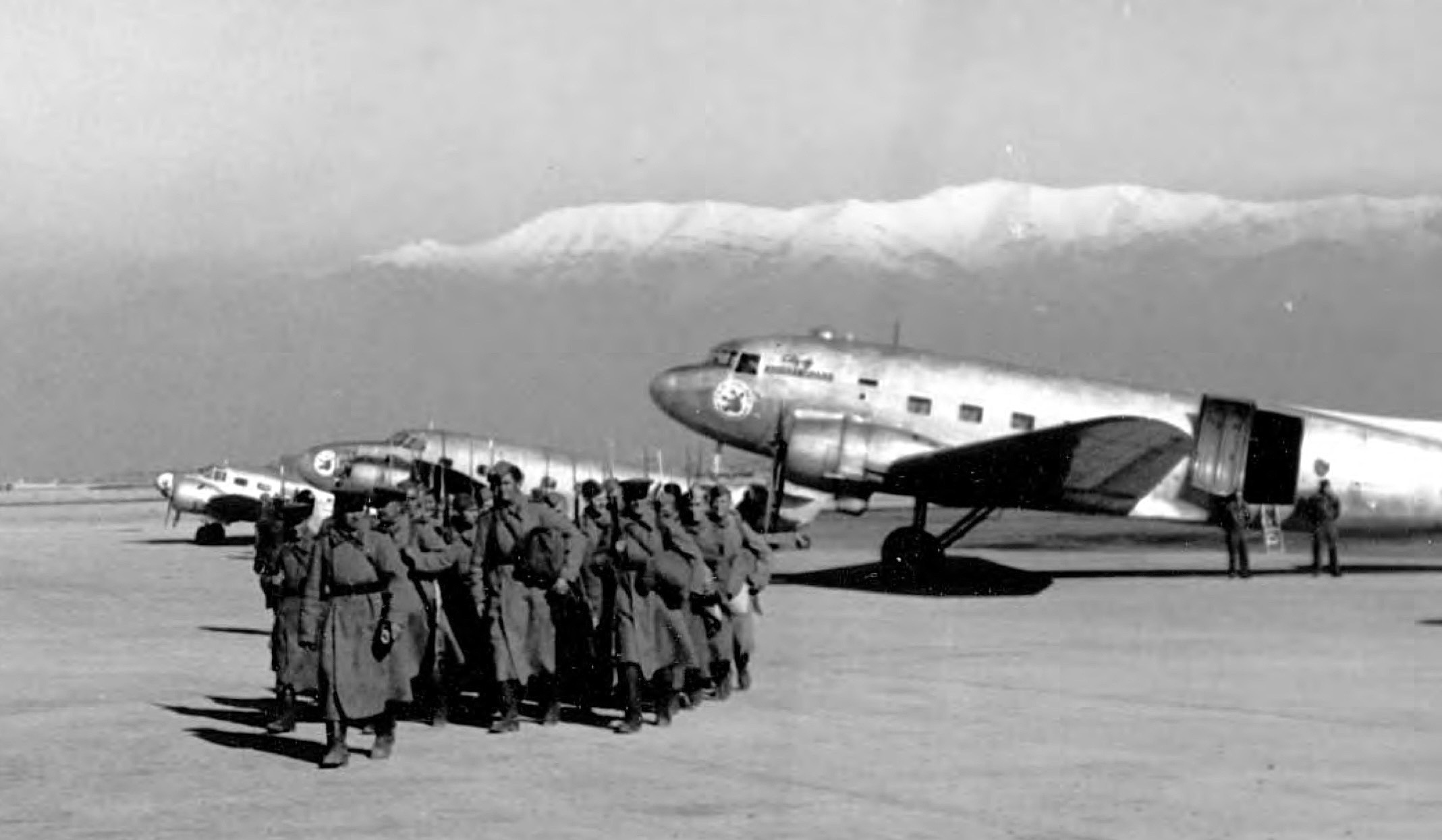
Detachment of Russian soldiers walk past an Air Transport Command Douglas C–47 at Ghale Morghi Airfield, 1940s.

=== Post-war ===
After World War II, Ghale Morghi Air Base began operating as a training base, and fighter-bomber squadrons were based elsewhere. By the 1950s, a training wing was based here, utilising the Lockheed T-33A, North American T-6 Texan, Boeing-Stearman PT-13 Kaydet, and the de Havilland Tiger Moth aircraft. The 3rd Training Squadron was operating out of the airfield, hosting a target-towing detachment and utilising the North American T-6G Texan acquired under the Military Assistance Program. In parallel to Ghale Morghi Air Base's development, the nearby Nazi Abad neighbourhood had encroached the eastern side of the airfield, influenced by post-war urban growth.

In 1975, a radar bright display link was provided to the air traffic control tower at Ghale Morghi Air Base. On 14 January 1989, the Council of Ministers approved transferring the Ghale Morghi garrison from the Ministries of Defence and the Revolutionary Guard to the Ministry of the Interior. Afterwards, it directed that the site be used as a future public green space and sports facility. By 1989, Ghale Morghi Air Base housed the Flying Training School of the Iranian Air Force and training units of the Army Air Force. It was designated as Tactical Air Base 11, with multiple tactical training squadrons and a single basic training squadron based here. By 1999, five TTS squadrons of the air force and three belonging to the army remained at the airport, operating the MFI-17 Mushshak, Beech F33A/C Bonanza, EMB-312 Tucano, and PC-7 Turbo-Trainer.

=== Closure ===
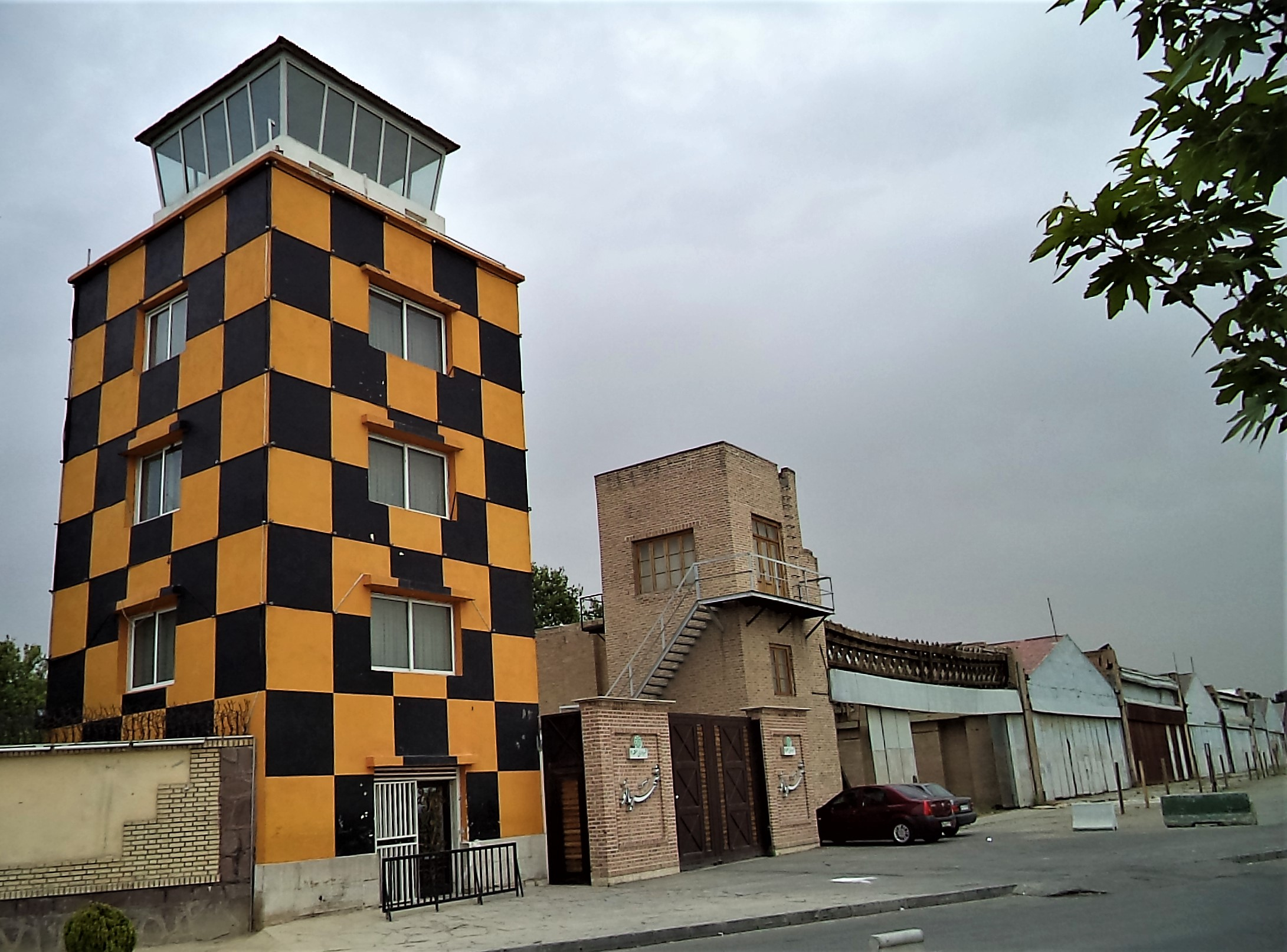
Former ATC and hangars of Ghale Morghi Airport, taken in April 2015.

In 2011, Ghale Morghi Air Base was closed and Doshan Tappeh Air Base assumed TAB 11 designation. At the time of closure, it provided 270 hectares of inner-city space. Afterwards, Tehran Municipality began the redevelopment of the former airport land, establishing Velayat Park. Additionally, a highway was built over the perimeter taxiway. The site is often compared to the Tempelhof Airfield in Berlin, both comprising similar size, location, and circumstances.

== Units ==
The following units that were based at Ghale Morghi Air Base:

Islamic Republic of Iran Air Force (1989)

- 111st Tactical Training Squadron, equipped with four JT2-2 Tazarve
- 112nd Tactical Training Squadron, equipped with four Parastu
- 113th Tactical Training Squadron, equipped with four Parastu
- 114th Tactical Training Squadron, equipped with nine EMB-312
- 115th Tactical Training Squadron, equipped with four Pilatus PC-7
- 116th Tactical Training Squadron, equipped with six Pilatus PC-7
- 117th Basic Training Squadron, equipped with 25 PAC MFI-17 Mushshak
- 111st Search and Rescue Squadron (Base flight), equipped with two Bell AB-205 and two Bell AB-206

Islamic Republic of Iran Army Aviation (1999)

- Helicopter Training Squadron, equipped with Bell AB 205 and Bell AB 206
- Helicopter Training Squadron, equipped with Hughes 300C
- Fixed Wing Training Squadron, equipped with Dassault Falcon 50

== Facilities ==
Ghale Morghi Air Base was equipped with two concrete runways: 6,000 x 150 ft orientated E/W and 6,000 x 150 ft orientated NN W/SSE. Both had a pavement bearing capacity of 140,000 lb, and the air base had a storage capacity of 17,000 gallons for Avgas. Facilities included seven brick hangars, headquarters and administrative building, stores and workshops, and permanent accommodation for 1,000 personnel.

== Accidents and incidents ==
- During late September 1953, a hangar containing 26 Republic F-47 Thunderbolt fighters and six North American T-6 trainers were set alight by Air Force saboteurs. Each aircraft's communication and wiring equipment were cut, and an ignited wick was tied to each T-6 trainers. At the time, all aircraft were fuelled in preparation for a reconnaissance mission amidst political unrest following the 1953 Iranian coup d'état. A sentry spotted the smoke, and firefighters extinguished the fire early.
- On 27 January 1962, a de Havilland Canada U-1A Otter of the U.S. Army 64th Engineer Battalion Topographic Training Team crashed into a snow-covered ridge during a sever snowstorm at approximately 12,500 feet. The crash occurred following departure from Ghale Morghi Air Base, and all five occupants survived the overturned wreckage, including pilots Captain Daniel L. Knotts and Major Donald Carder. The 10th Special Forces Group engaged a successful rescue operations afterwards.
- In March 2001, a private light aircraft crashed near Ghale Morghi Air Base, killing both the pilot and flight instructor.
