= Chihhang Air Base =

Military airbase in Taiwan

Coordinates: 22°47′34″N 121°10′55″E

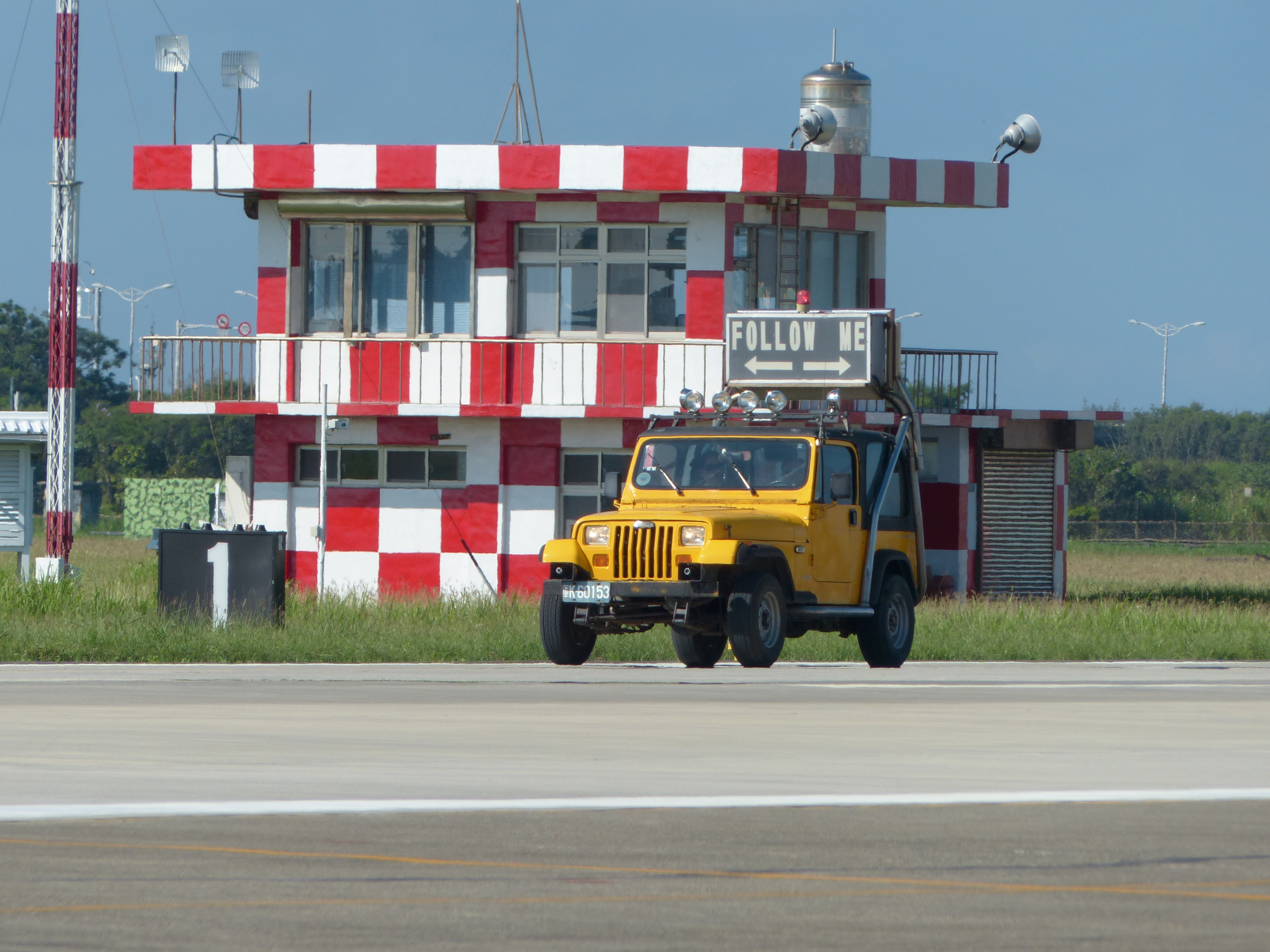
Follow-me car on runway of Chihhang Air Force Base

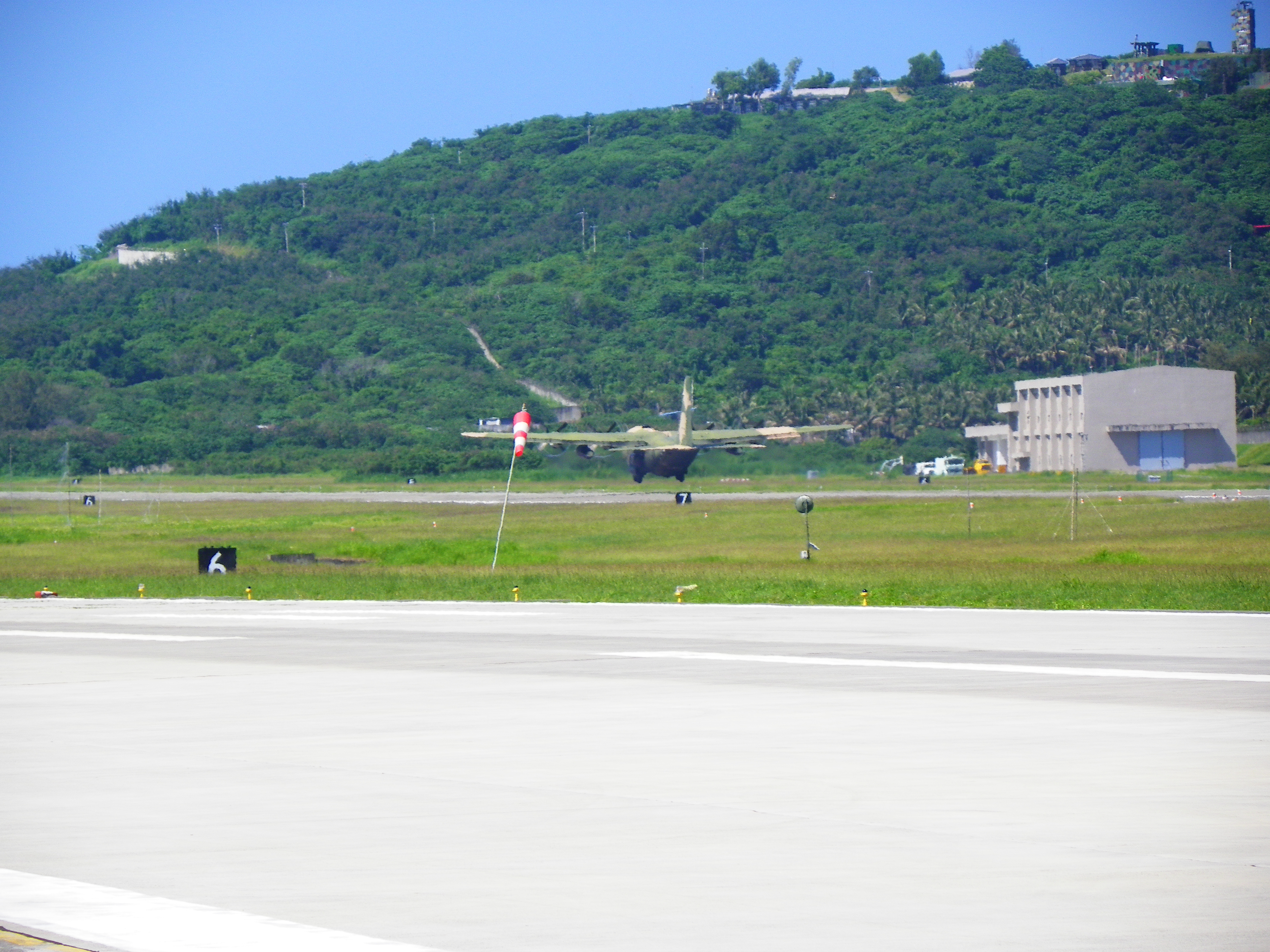
ROCAF C-130H 1309 taking off from Chihhang Air Force Base Runway

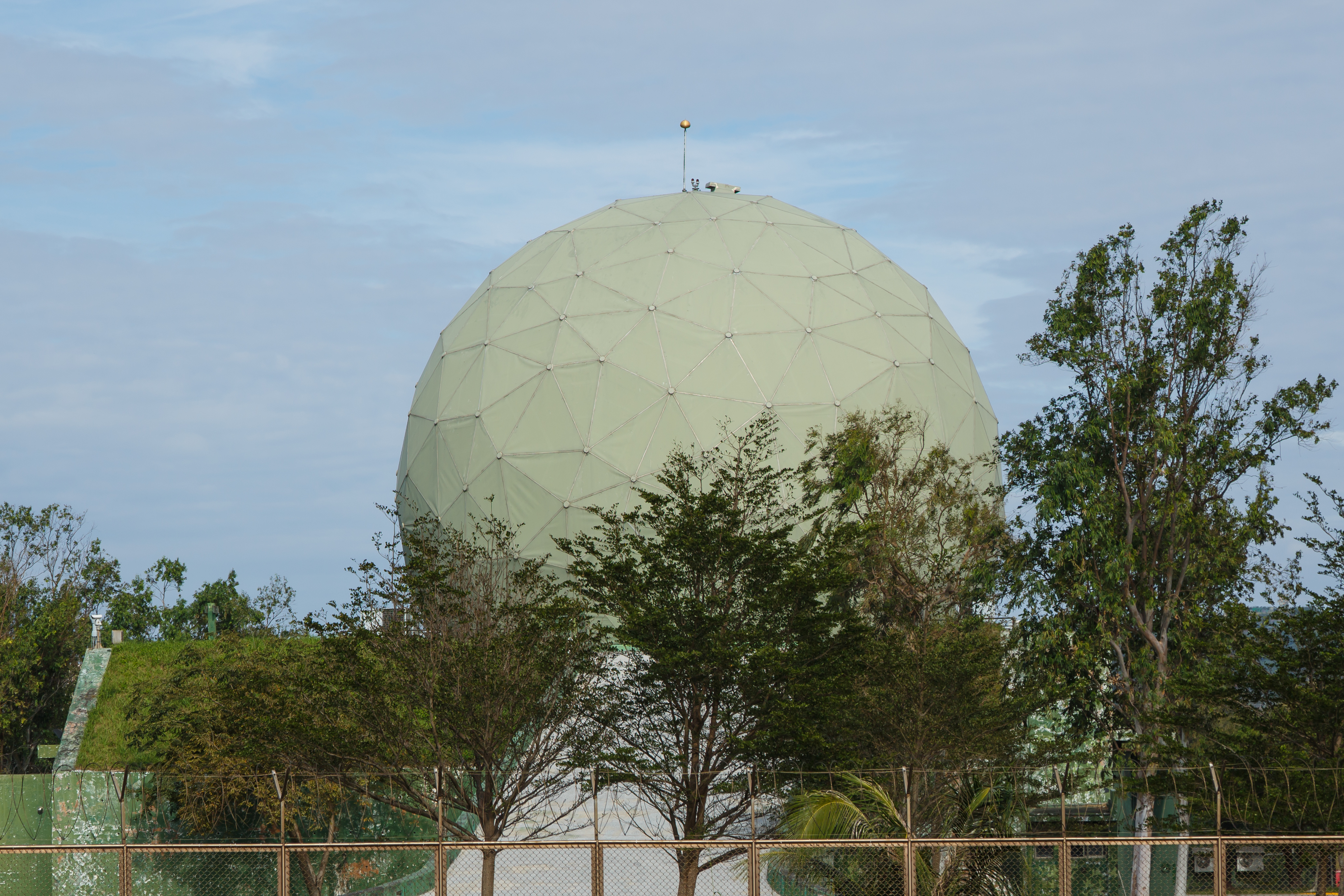
Radar Station at Taitung Air Force Base

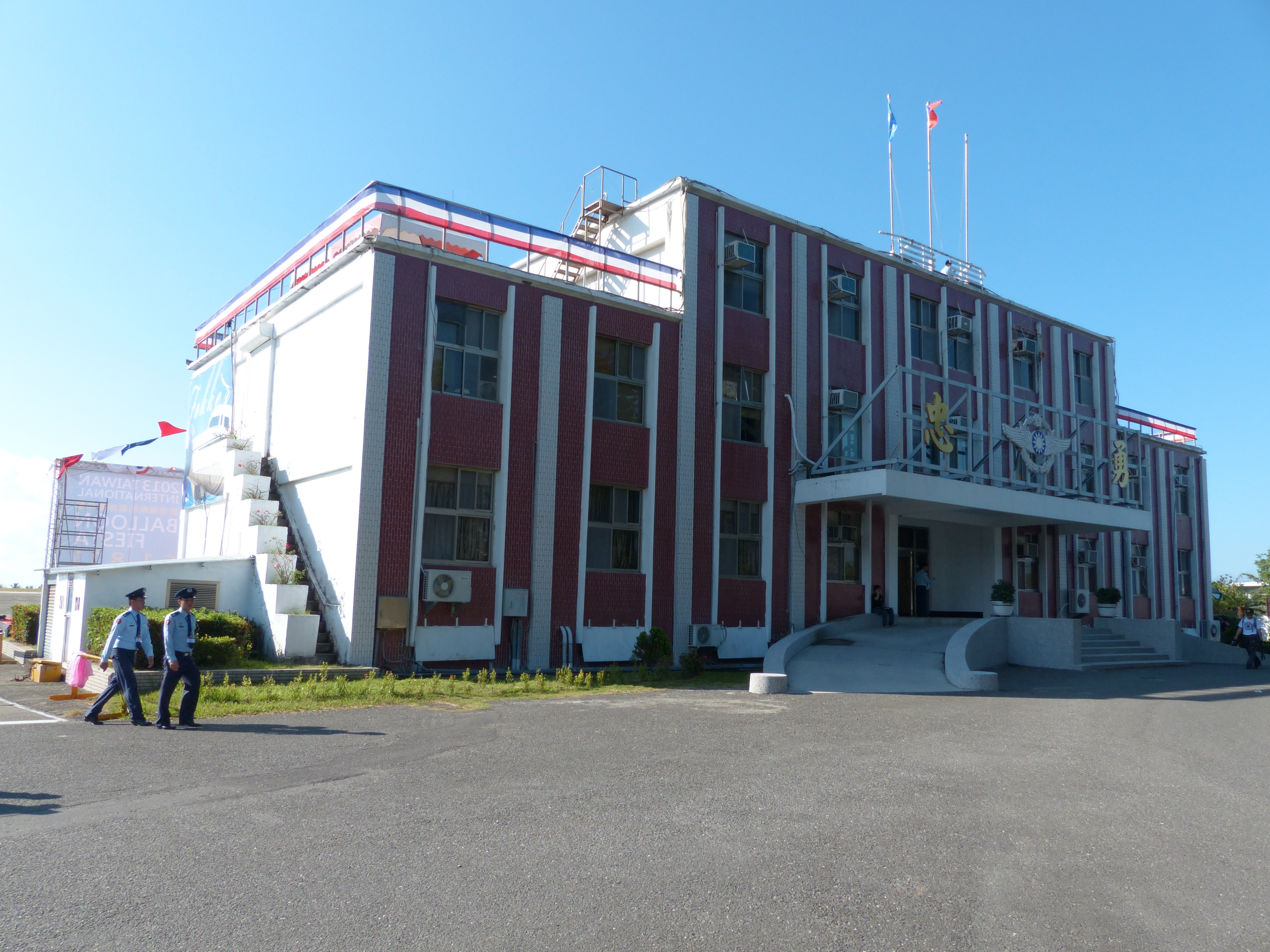
Chihhang Air Force Base main building

Chihhang Air Base, also known as Taitung Air Force Base, is a military airport operated by the Republic of China Air Force in Taitung County, Taiwan. It is best known for its extensive underground hangars.

== History ==
In 2018 the Air Force issued a solicitation for an automated CIWS system to add an additional layer of protection to Chihhang Air Base.

It has been named as the likely home for two squadrons of F-16Vs Taiwan will acquire from the US starting in 2023. The location was recommended by the Institute for National Defense and Security Research.

== Facilities ==
The Shihzishan (石子山) or “Stone Mountain” complex is an underground hangar and support complex located at the north end of the air base. Its tunnels can shelter up to eighty aircraft.

== See also ==
- Taoyuan Air Base
- Ching Chuan Kang Air Base
- Chiashan Air Force Base
