= Chiashan Air Force Base =

Military airport in Taiwan

Coordinates: 24°01′35″N 121°35′26″E

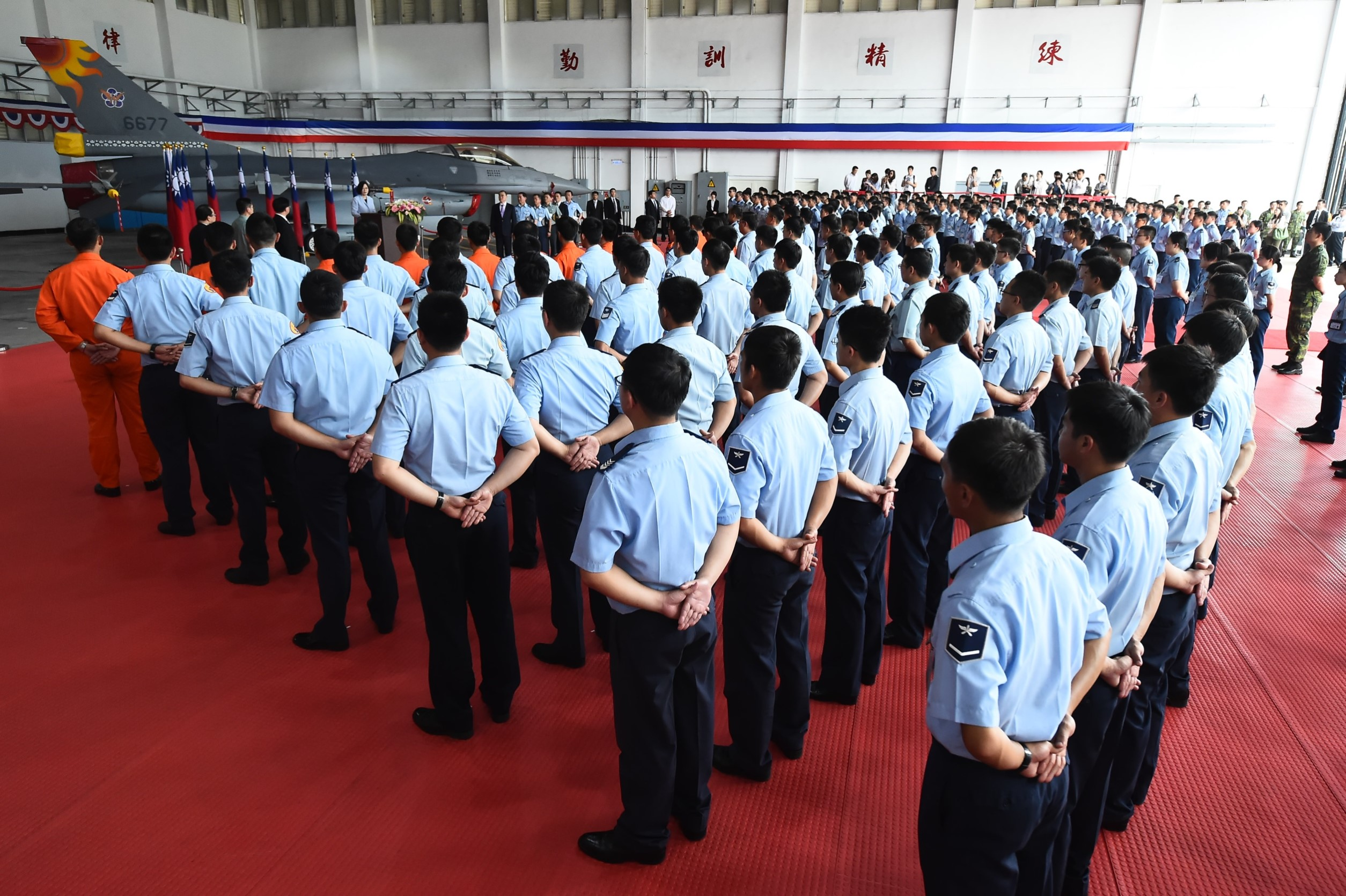
Chiashan Air Force Base aboveground hangar interior

Chiashan Air Force Base (Chinese: 佳山基地) is a military airport operated by the Republic of China Air Force in Hualien County, Taiwan. It is known for its extensive underground hangars. Hualien Airport operates within a 28-acre civilian section of the base. It is one of the most important defense installations on Taiwan as it houses the military's most survivable aerial counter-attack forces.

== History ==
In 2018 the Air Force issued a solicitation for an automated CIWS system to add an additional layer of protection to Chihhang Air Base and Chiashan Air Force Base.

== Facilities ==
Construction of the main underground section of the base spanned from 1985 to 1993 and cost more than 27 billion NTD to build. The underground hangars can accommodate approximately 200 fighters. The underground complex has ten blast doors which exit to multiple runways. It also has its own hospital as well as multiple underground gas stations.

== See also ==
- Taoyuan Air Base
- Ching Chuan Kang Air Base
- Jiashan Plan
