= George V. Holloman =

American Army inventor (1902–1946)

George Vernon Holloman (1902–1946) was an American inventor in the United States Army.

George Holloman was born in Rich Square, North Carolina in 1902.

With Carl J. Crane, Holloman developed and demonstrated an automatic landing system for airplanes. For his invention he was awarded the Mackay Trophy in 1938. He died in a crash in Formosa in 1946.

On 19 March, 1946 Holloman was killed in a Boeing B-17G-95-DL (44-83779, piloted by Major General James Edmund Parker) accident due to bad weather in Hokusekiko, Taiwan, en route from China to the Philippines. Holloman had received the DFC for conducting the first instrument-only landing of an aircraft. Alamogordo Army Air Base in New Mexico was renamed Holloman AFB on 13 January 1948.
