= Hesa Air Base =

- IATA: IFH; ICAO: OIFE

Summary
- Airport type: Military
- Owner: Iran Aircraft Manufacturing Industrial Company
- Operator: Iran Aircraft Manufacturing Industrial Company
- Location: Shahin Shahr, Isfahan Province, Iran
- Elevation AMSL: 5,256 ft / 1,602 m
- Coordinates: 32°55′43.8″N 051°33′40.2″E

Map
- Location of airport in Iran

Runways
Direction	Length		Surface
Direction	ft	m	Surface
07/25	9,830	2,996	Asphalt
- Source: SkyVector

Hesa Air Base (IATA: IFH, ICAO: OIFE) belongs to the Iran's Aircraft Manufacturing Industrial Company HESA and it has been built near of Esfahan.
