= Oghab 44 =

Underground airbase in Iran

Coordinates: 28°03′23″N 55°30′24″E

- Iran

Site information
- Type: Iranian underground Air Force Base
- Owner: Islamic Republic of Iran Air Force
- Controlled by: Islamic Republic of Iran Air Force
- Condition: Operational

Location

Site history
- Built: 2023
- In use: 2023 – present

Oghab 44 or Eagle 44 (in Persian: عقاب 44) is an Iranian underground airbase unveiled in February 2023. It is the first tactical and secret airbase for the army's air force that accommodates fighters, bombers, and unmanned aerial vehicles.

Oghab 44 includes: an alert area, a command post, aircraft hangars, repair and maintenance facilities, navigation and airport equipment and fuel storage.

The underground bases are used to protect fighter jets in secure locations and outfit aircraft with electronic warfare systems and a variety of bombs and missiles, including Yasin, Qaem and Asef missiles, enabling long-range airstrikes and expanding strategic strikes to distant targets.

Satellite imagery of the Oghab-44 airbase reveals strikes during the 2026 Iran war.

== Nomination ==
The "44" in the name refers to the forty-fourth anniversary of the 1979 revolution in Iran. The Islamic Republic of Iran Air Force has called Oghab 44 a "hybrid" base capable of operating UAVs and crewed fighters.
