= Doshan Tappeh Air Base =

- IATA: none; ICAO: OIID

Summary
- Airport type: Military
- Owner: IRIAF
- Operator: IRIAF
- Location: Tehran, Iran
- Elevation AMSL: 4,021 ft / 1,226 m
- Coordinates: 35°42′10.74″N 51°28′30.47″E

Map
- Location of airport in Iran

Runways
Direction	Length		Surface
Direction	ft	m	Surface
04/22	7,550	2,301	Asphalt
- Source: World Aero Data

Doshan Tappeh Airport (ICAO: OIID) is located in the Piroozi street (Formerly Farahabad) east of Tehran, the capital of Iran. It is in the middle of IRIAF main base.

Doshan Tappeh became operational as an airfield in the 1930s, being the site of one of Iran's early aircraft factories.

Nowadays the airport is closed since it is surrounded by houses and other urban areas. In the last decade the airport was used as a flight training base for IRIAF and there were some glider and kite flights within it, but now all of the flights are stopped. The airport runways are still in operational condition to serve emergency flights during probable earthquakes or other accidents in eastern Tehran. This airport and other offices of IRIAF have occupied a lot of space in urban area of eastern Tehran and are one of the main reasons for very heavy traffic in Piroozi street and Damavand street.
