= Qazvin Airport =

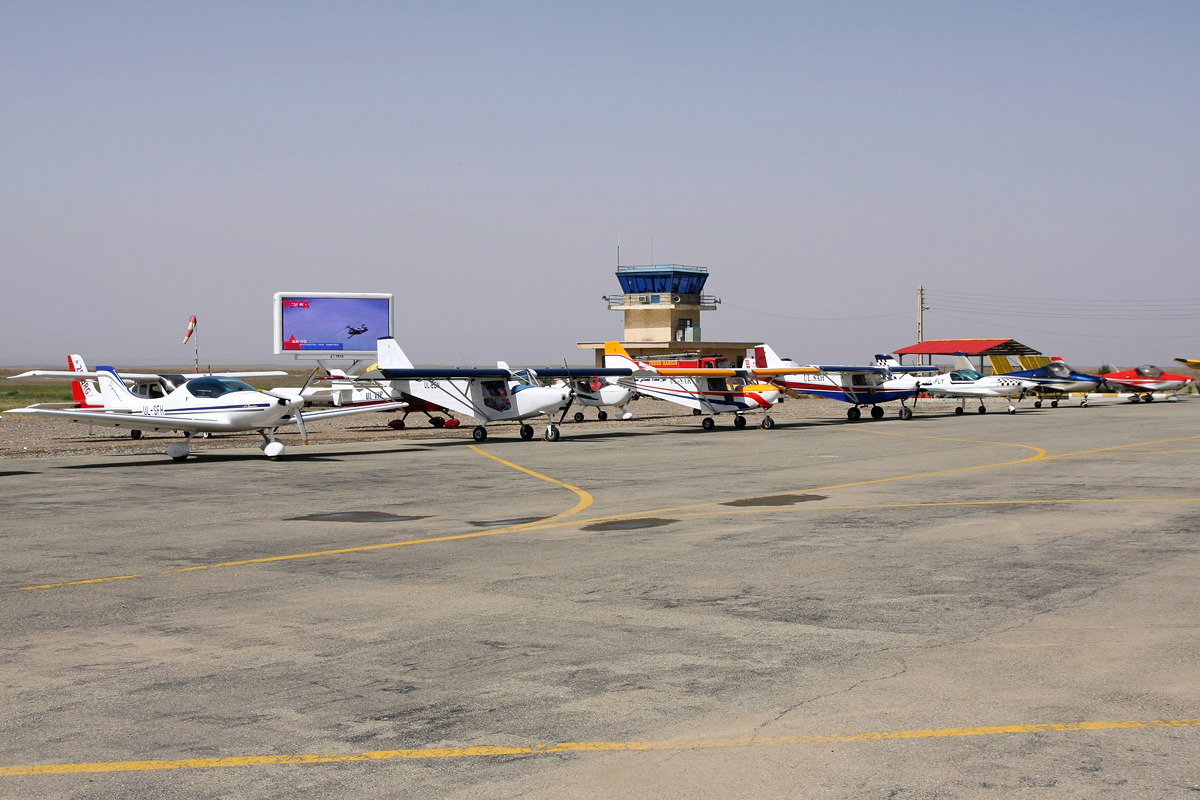
- IATA: GZW; ICAO: OIIK

Summary
- Airport type: Public
- Owner: Qazvin Municipality
- Operator: Qazvin Municipality
- Serves: Qazvin Province
- Location: Qazvin, Iran
- Elevation AMSL: 4,184 ft / 1,275 m
- Coordinates: 36°14′24.2″N 050°02′49.8″E

Map
- Location of airport in Iran

Runways
Direction	Length		Surface
Direction	ft	m	Surface
10/28	3,670	1,119	Asphalt
- Source:World Aero Data

Qazvin Airport (IATA: GZW, ICAO: OIIK) is an airport in Qazvin, which is the capital city of Iran's Qazvin province.
