= Bandar Abbas International Airport =

Bandar Abbas International Airport فرودگاه بین المللی بندرعباس
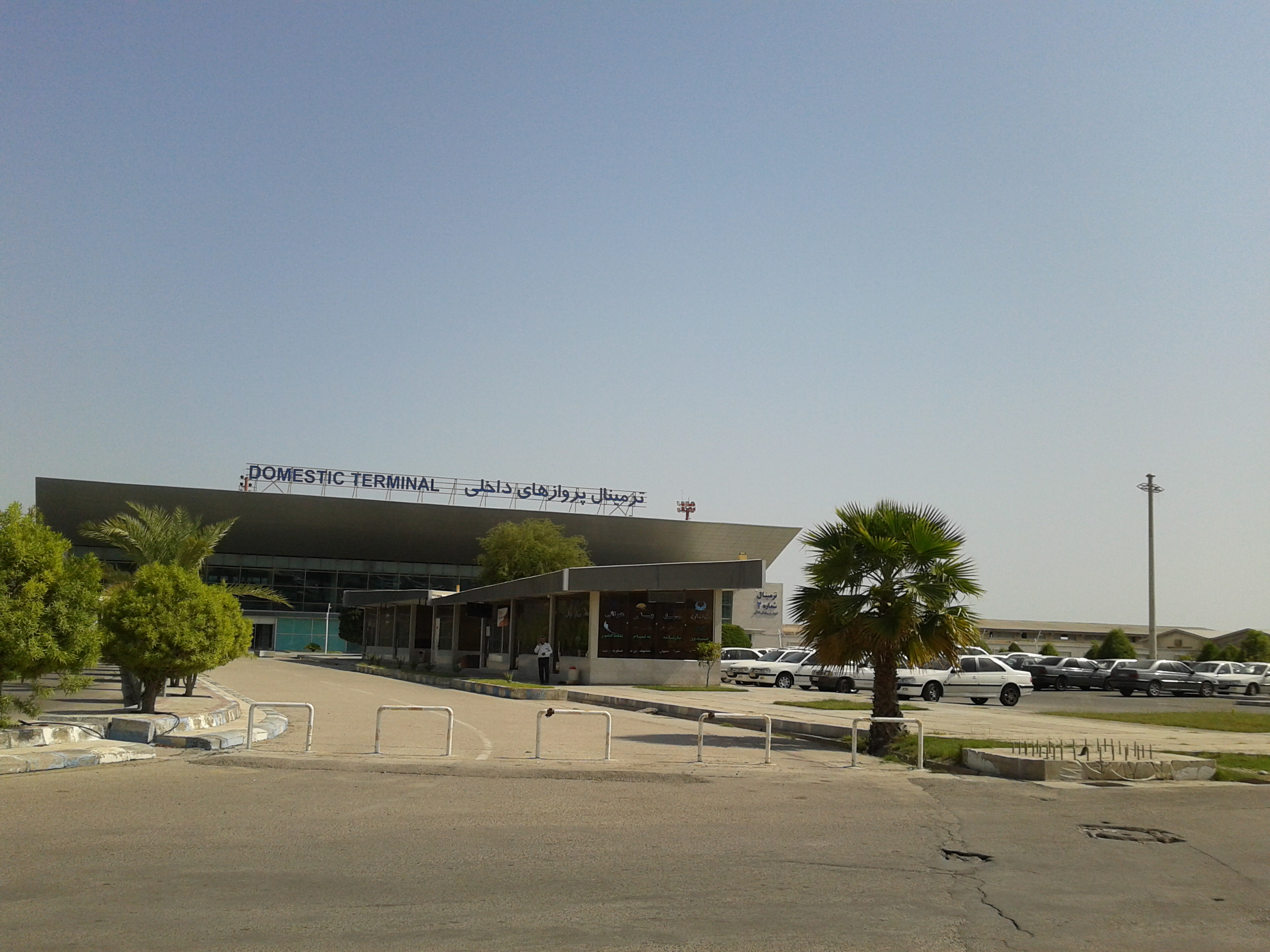
- IATA: BND; ICAO: OIKB

Summary
- Airport type: Public/Military
- Owner: Government of Iran
- Operator: Iran Airports Company; Iranian Air Force; Islamic Republic of Iran Navy Aviation; Islamic Revolutionary Guard Corps
- Serves: Bandar Abbas, Hormozgan
- Location: Bandar Abbas, Iran
- Focus city for: Iran Air; Karun Airlines
- Elevation AMSL: 22 ft / 7 m
- Coordinates: 27°13′05″N 56°22′40″E
- Website: bandarabbas.airport.ir

Map
- Location of airport in Iran

Runways
Direction	Length		Surface
Direction	m	ft	Surface
03R/21L	3,660	12,008	Asphalt
03L/21R	3,457	11,341	Asphalt

Statistics (2017)
- Aircraft Movements: 11,406 ▲11%
- Passengers: 1,289,063 ▲15%
- Cargo: 12,717 tons ▲18%
- Source: Iran Airports Company

Bandar Abbas International Airport (IATA: BND, ICAO: OIKB) (Persian: فرودگاه بین المللی بندرعباس) is an international airport located 12 kilometers east of the city of Bandar Abbas, Hormozgan Province, in southern Iran. The airport has flight connections to different parts of Iran and countries of south of Persian Gulf, and about 1,289,000 passengers passed through it in 2017. This airport is able to handle widebody aircraft such as Boeing 777 or Boeing 747.

== Airlines and destinations ==
Airlines	Destinations
Air1Air	Tehran–Mehrabad
Asa Jet	Tehran–Mehrabad
ATA Airlines	Tehran–Mehrabad
AVA Airlines	Tehran–Mehrabad
Caspian Airlines	Sharjah, Tehran–Mehrabad
Chabahar Airlines	Tehran–Mehrabad
Flydubai	Dubai–International
FlyPersia	Tehran–Mehrabad
Iran Air	Abu Musa, Ahvaz, Chabahar/Konarak, Doha, Isfahan, Kish, Shiraz, Tehran–Mehrabad, Yazd; Seasonal: Jeddah, Medina
Iran Airtour	Mashhad, Tabriz, Tehran–Mehrabad
Iran Aseman Airlines	Rasht, Shiraz, Tehran–Mehrabad
Karun Airlines	Abu Musa, Ahvaz, Isfahan, Lamerd, Shiraz, Sirri Island, Tehran–Mehrabad
Kish Air	Isfahan, Kish, Mashhad, Tabriz, Tehran–Mehrabad; Seasonal: Najaf
Mahan Air	Tehran–Mehrabad
Pars Air	Shiraz, Tehran–Mehrabad
Pouya Air	Abu Musa, Bushehr, Chabahar/Konarak, Greater Tunb, Mashhad, Shiraz, Sirri Island, Tehran–Mehrabad
Qeshm Air	Dubai–International, Kish, Tehran–Mehrabad
Saha Airlines	Tehran–Mehrabad
Sepehran Airlines	Mashhad, Tehran–Mehrabad
Taban Air	Shiraz, Tehran–Mehrabad
Varesh Airlines	Sari, Tehran–Mehrabad
Zagros Airlines	Tehran–Mehrabad

== Incidents ==
- Iran Air Flight 655 was shot down after departing from Bandar Abbas in 1988.
- IRIAF F-4 Phantom II crashed near Bandar Abbas on October 14, 2012, killing two airmen.

== Gallery ==
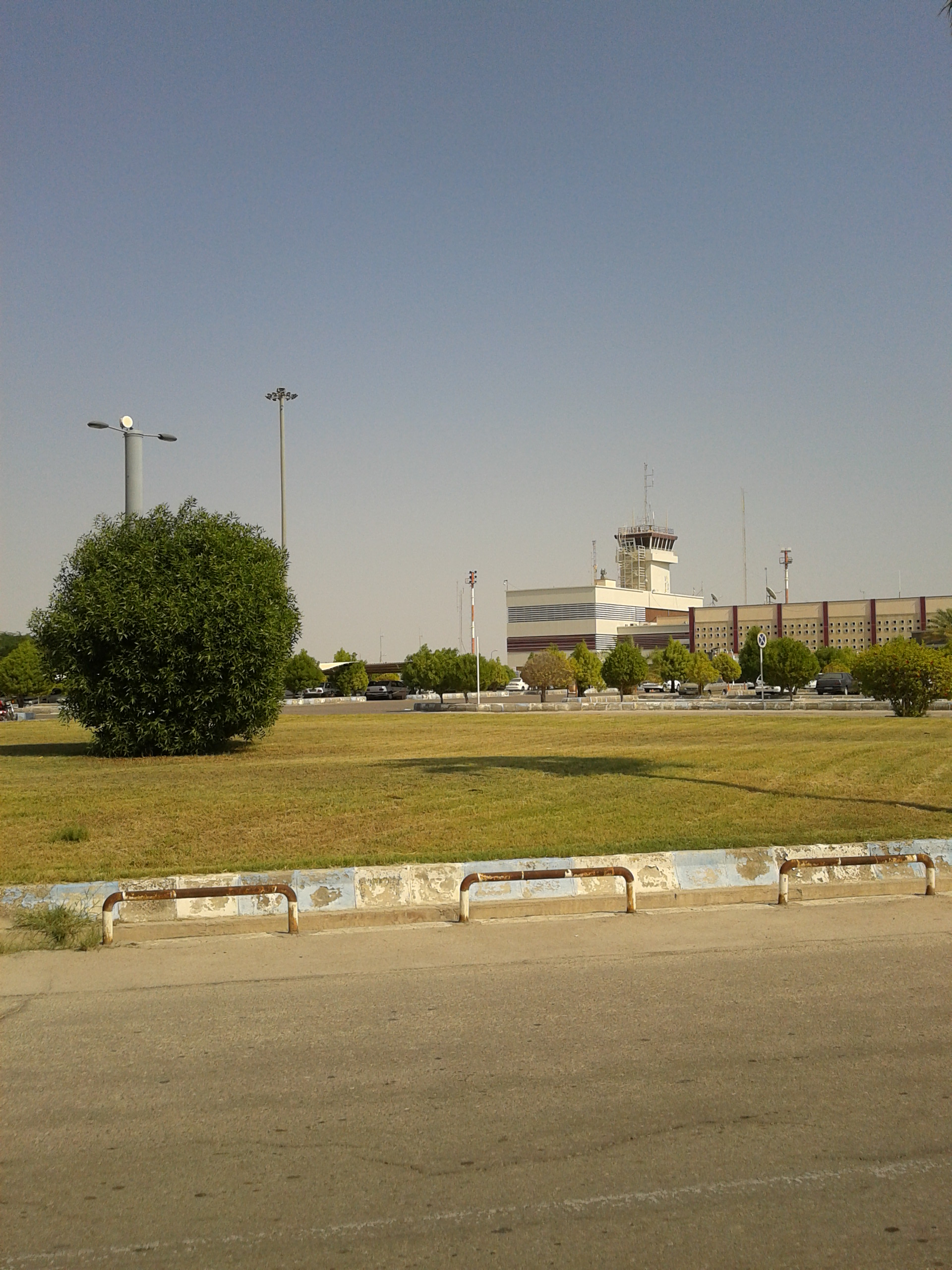

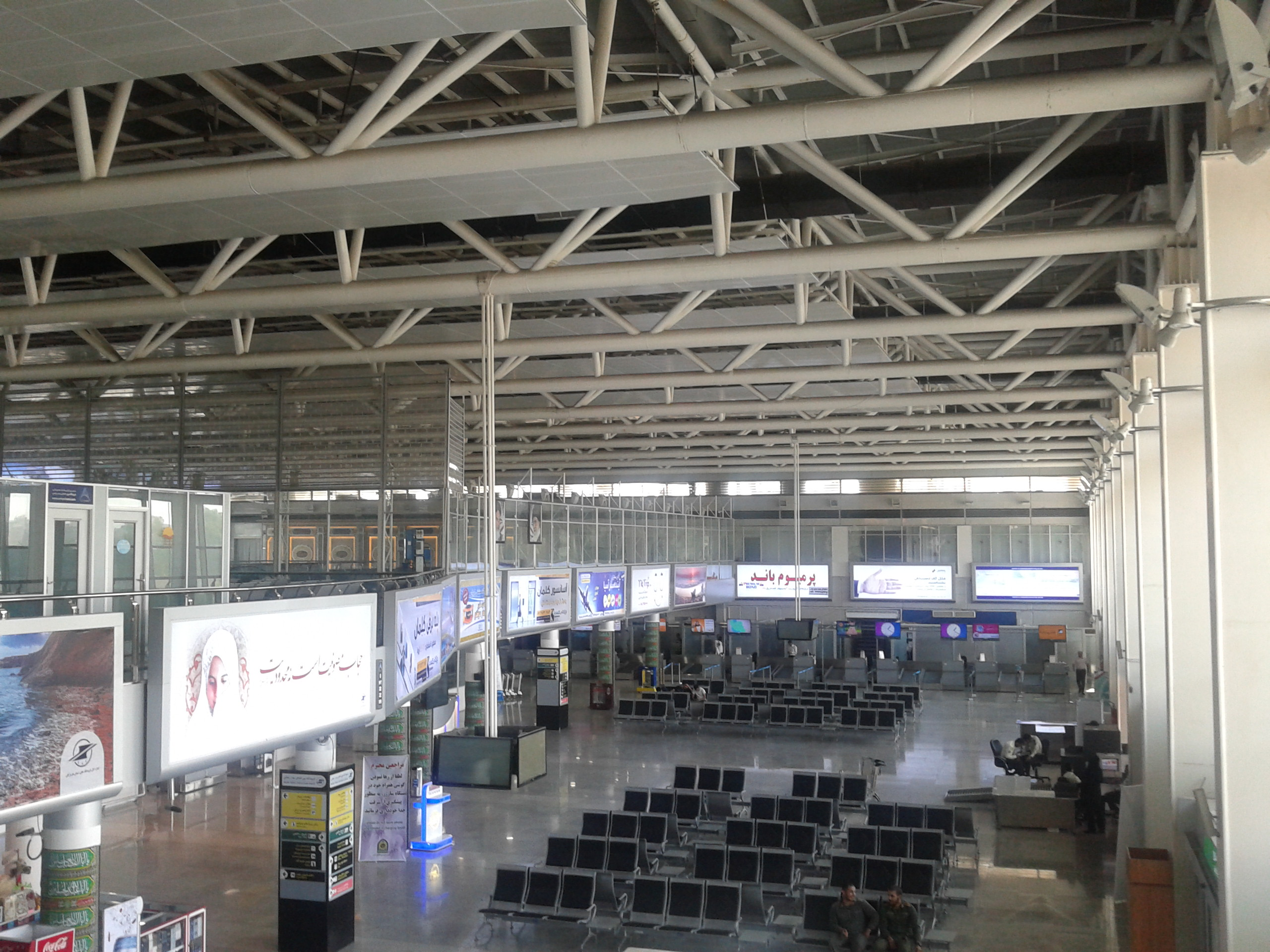

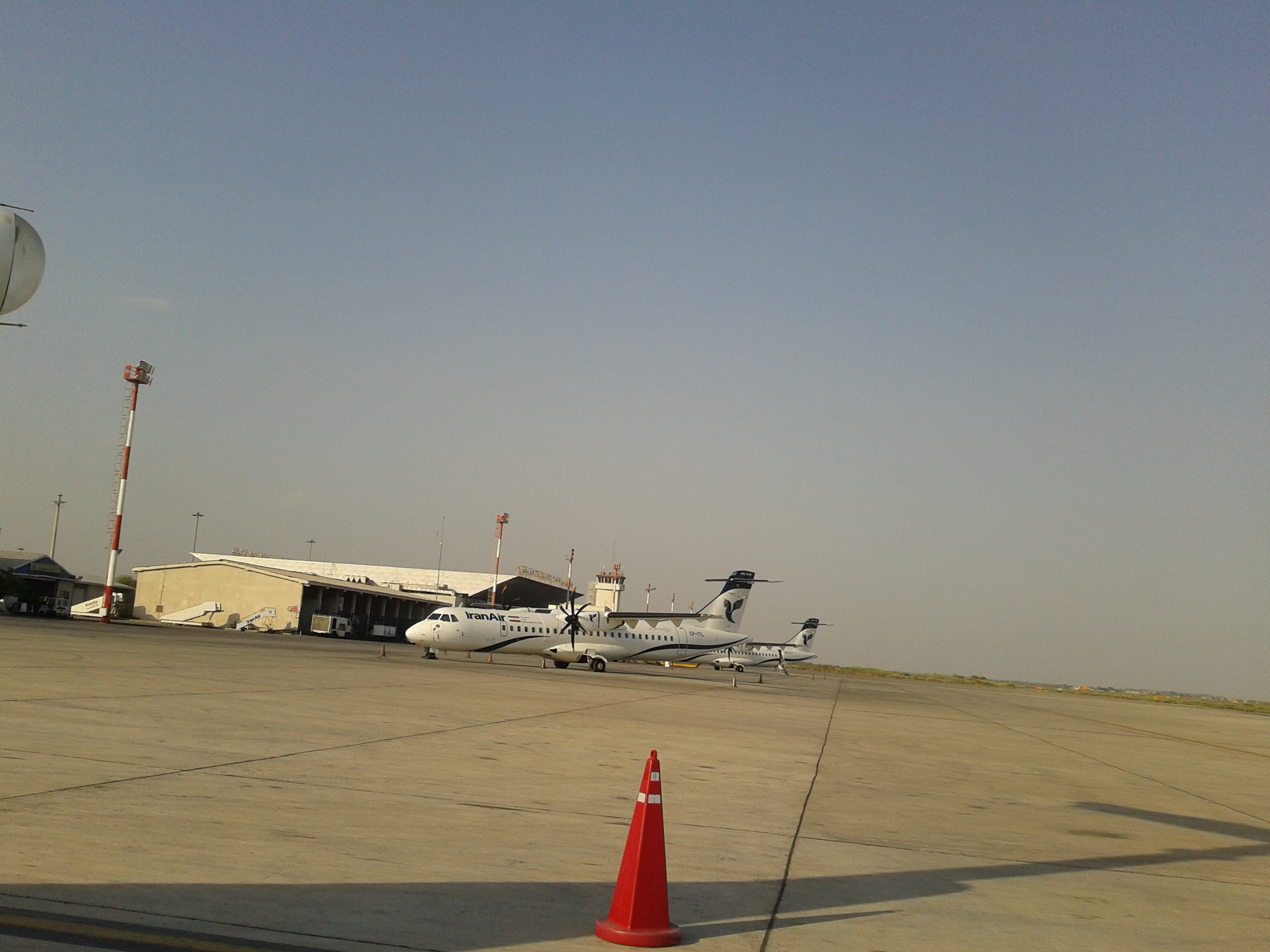

== See also ==
- Iran Civil Aviation Organization
- Transport in Iran
- List of airports in Iran
- List of the busiest airports in Iran
- List of airlines of Iran
- Bandar Abbas
- Iran
