= Azerbaijan Square =

Square in Tabriz, Iran

Coordinates: 38.112789°N 46.269789°E

Azerbaijan Square is the largest square in Tabriz. The square is in the vicinity of Tabriz International Airport.
