= Qeshm International Airport =

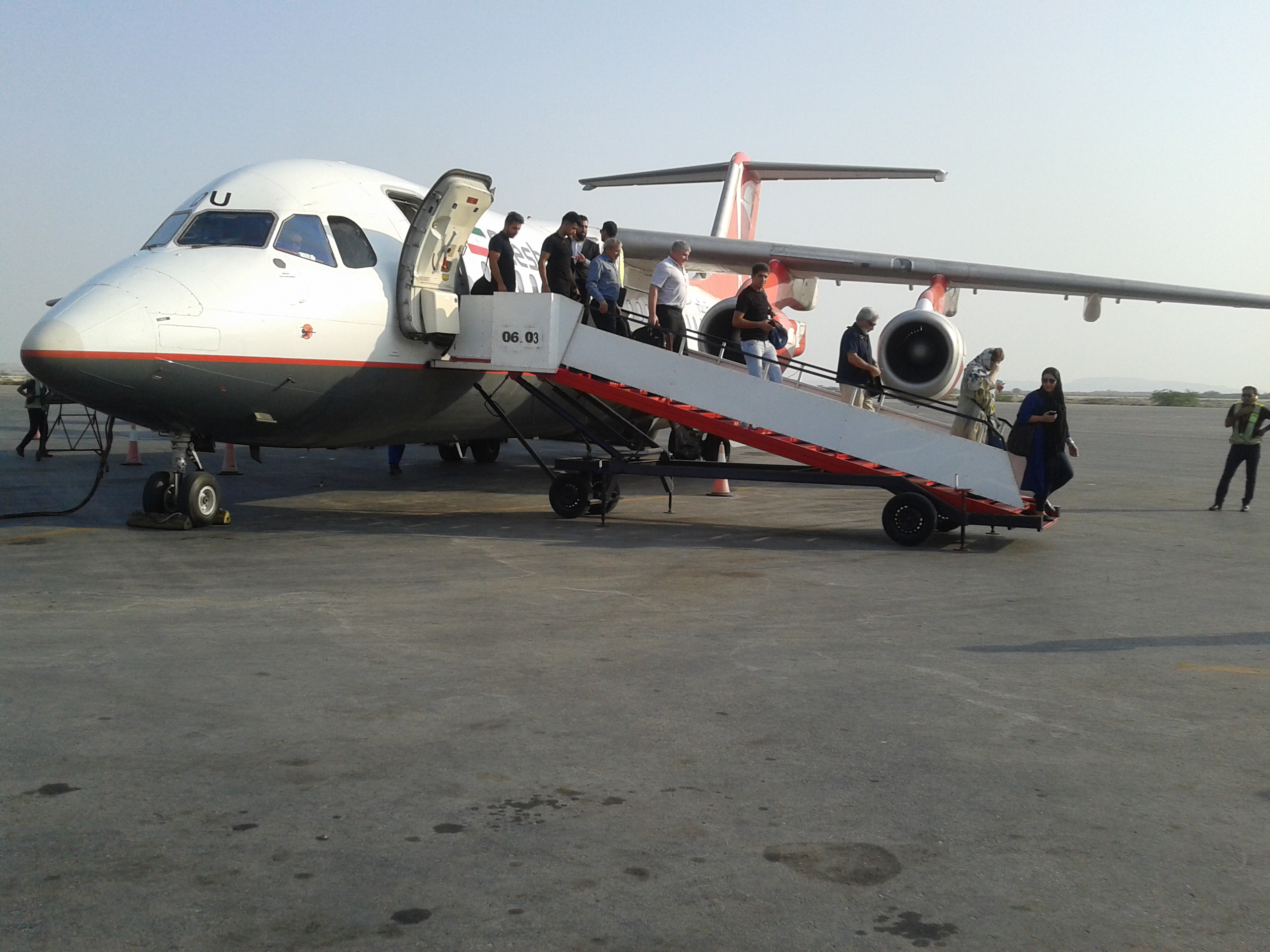
- IATA: GSM; ICAO: OIKQ

Summary
- Airport type: Public
- Owner: Qeshm Free Zone Organization
- Operator: Iran Airports Company
- Serves: Qeshm, Hormozgan
- Location: Dayrestan, Iran
- Hub for: Qeshm Air
- Elevation AMSL: 45 ft (14 m)
- Coordinates: 26°45′16.70″N 055°54′08.47″E

Map
- Location of airport in Iran

Runways
Direction	Length		Surface
Direction	ft	m	Surface
05/23	13,864	4,226	Asphalt

Statistics (2017)
- Aircraft Movements: 5,521 ▲3%
- Passengers: 517,097 ▲19%
- Cargo: 4,943 tons ▲11%
- Source: Iran Airports Company

Qeshm International Airport (IATA: GSM, ICAO: OIKQ) (Persian: فرودگاه بين المللي قشم) is an international airport near the village of Dayrestan, roughly in the centre of Qeshm Island, off the south coast of Iran.

== Facilities ==
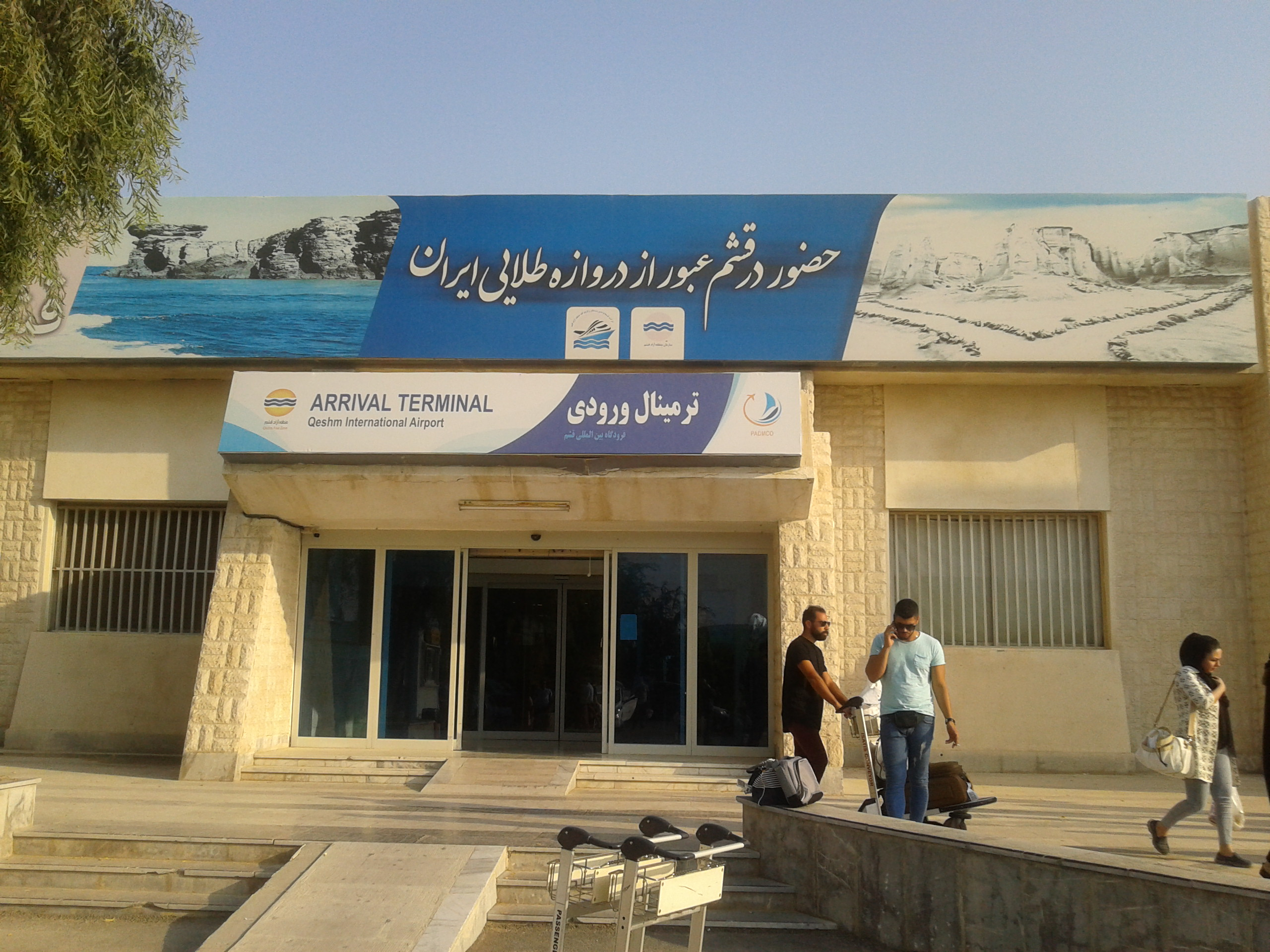
Qeshm International Airport - 2019

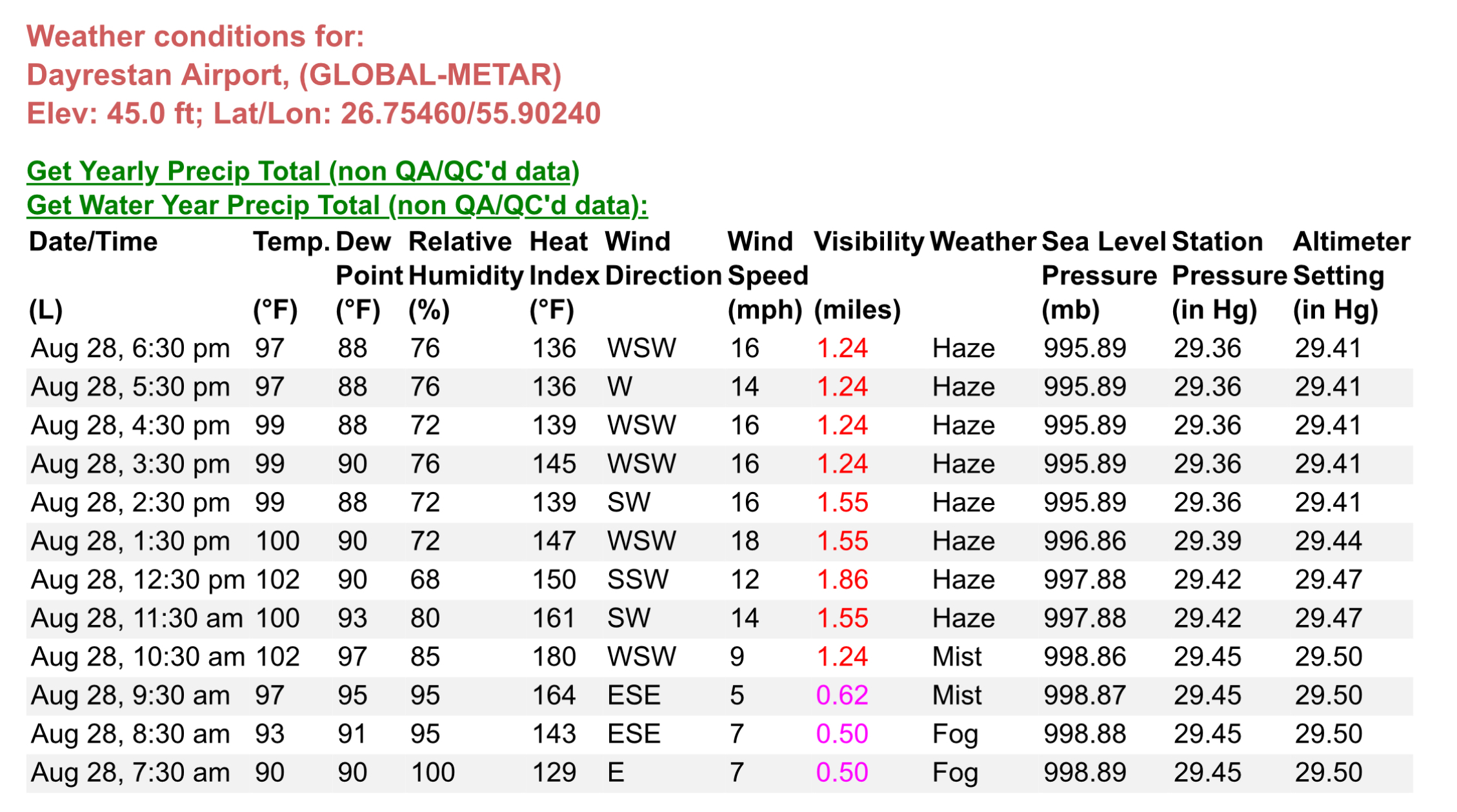
METAR data from the airport on 28 August 2024

Dr Allan Wain, economics and policy advisor, stated that the overall site area available for expansion of airport uses measures approximately 2,032 ha (218,700,000 ft^{2}), although only a very small area on the northwest side of the property is used for aviation activities. Dr Wain further indicated that most of the airport facilities that currently exist were constructed in 1996 and 1997, and the airport opened to commercial air traffic in July 1997. The fuel farm and ATC tower were constructed in 2002/3.

The airport is served by commercial air services that link Qeshm Island to the United Arab Emirates and to Tehran.

Dr Wain said that passenger traffic amounts to some 206,570 passengers (2004 figure), which is an overall increase of 30 per cent in passenger volumes since 2002. All of this increase is in the international sector, as there has been a slight decline (2.6%) in domestic passengers in this time. 73% of passenger traffic is international, although approximately half of that is "visa traffic" on quick turnaround flights, which are generated in response to the visa regulations for migrant workers in the UAE states.

A small amount of cargo traffic is handled by the airport, but this is limited in extent and handled informally through the passenger terminal, as no facilities exist to accommodate air cargo operations.

The airport has registered some of the highest dew points ever measured, including 97 on both 28 August 2024 and 31 July 2025.

== Airlines and destinations ==
Airlines	Destinations
Air1Air	Tehran–Mehrabad
Asa Jet	Isfahan, Rasht, Tehran–Mehrabad
ATA Airlines	Isfahan, Tehran–Mehrabad
AVA Airlines	Tehran–Mehrabad
Caspian Airlines	Mashhad, Sharjah, Tehran–Mehrabad
Chabahar Airlines	Tehran–Mehrabad
flydubai	Dubai–International
FlyPersia	Isfahan, Shiraz, Tehran–Mehrabad
Iran Air	Shiraz, Tehran–Mehrabad; Seasonal: Jeddah, Medina
Iran Airtour	Tehran–Mehrabad
Iran Aseman Airlines	Tehran–Mehrabad
Karun Airlines	Ahvaz
Kish Air	Tehran–Mehrabad
Meraj Airlines	Isfahan, Mashhad, Tehran–Mehrabad
Pars Air	Tehran–Mehrabad
Pouya Air	Rasht, Tehran–Mehrabad
Qeshm Air	Dubai–International, Isfahan, Kermanshah, Mashhad, Muscat, Shiraz, Tehran–Mehrabad
Saha Airlines	Tehran–Mehrabad
Sepehran Airlines	Mashhad, Tehran–Mehrabad
Taban Air	Mashhad, Tehran–Mehrabad
Varesh Airlines	Isfahan, Mashhad, Sari, Tehran–Mehrabad
Yazd Airways	Isfahan, Shiraz, Tehran–Mehrabad, Yazd
Zagros Airlines	Mashhad, Tehran–Mehrabad
