= Sohar Airport =

Suhar International Airport
- IATA: OHS; ICAO: OOSH

Summary
- Airport type: Military/Public
- Owner: Oman
- Operator: Oman Airports Management Company S.A.O.C.
- Serves: Suhar, Al Batinah Region, Oman
- Elevation AMSL: 144 ft / 44 m
- Coordinates: 24°23′10″N 56°37′32″E
- Website: https://www.suharairport.co.om

Map

Runways
Direction	Length		Surface
Direction	m	ft	Surface
15/33	4,015	13,173	Asphalt
- GCM Google Maps

Suhar International Airport (IATA: OHS, ICAO: OOSH) is an international airport situated in the wilayat of Suhar in Al Batinah Region of Oman. Suhar is a coastal city on the Gulf of Oman.

The airport is 7 kilometres (4 mi) inland. The runway length does not include 120 metres (390 ft) displaced thresholds on both ends. The Fujairah VOR-DME (Ident: FJR) is located 45.5 nautical miles (84 km) north-northwest of the airport.

== Construction ==
The airport was built in three packages. Package 1 included site preparation, package 2 included the infrastructure works, and package 3 included the construction of airport facilities. The construction of the airport cost 100 million rials to build.

A temporary airport was opened on 18 November 2014 before the completion of the passenger terminal building. Sohar airport was opened by Dr. Ahmed bin Mohammed bin Salim Al Futaisi, Minister of Transport and Communications, as part of 44th National Day celebrations in November 2014, and Oman Air operated an inaugural flight to mark the official opening. International flights to and from Sohar Airport commenced on 9 July 2017, with Air Arabia service to Sharjah.

== Airlines and destinations ==
Airlines	Destinations
Air Arabia	Sharjah
Pars Air	Shiraz
Taban Air	Shiraz
SalamAir	Salalah

== See also ==
- Transport in Oman
- List of airports in Oman
