= Kish Air =

Iranian airline

Kish Airlines

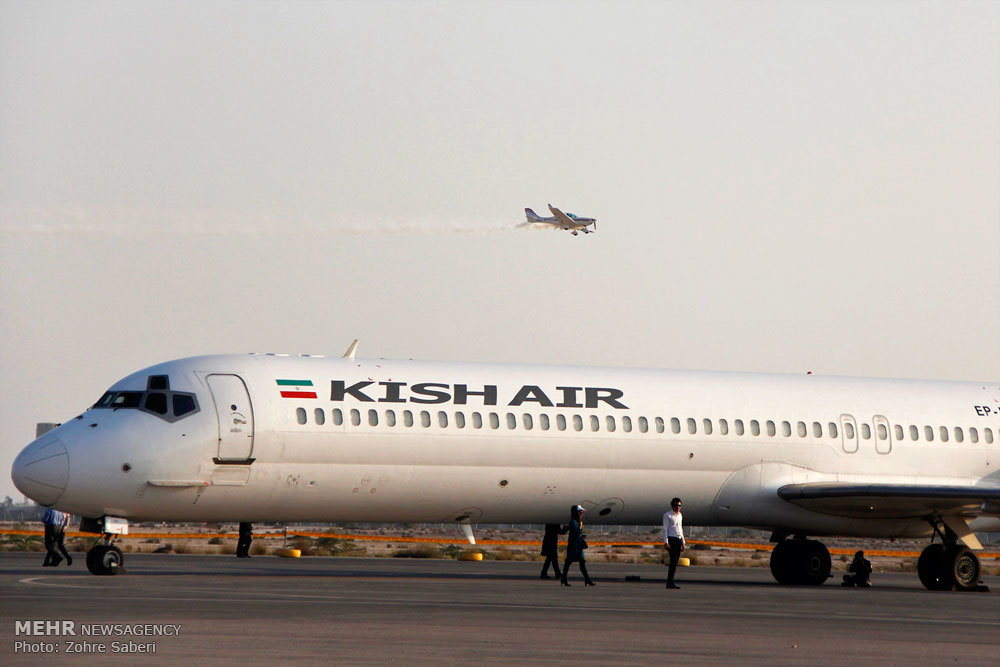
- A Kish Air aircraft from the MD 80 family at the 2014 Kish Airshow
| IATA | ICAO | Call sign |
|---|---|---|
| Y9 | KIS | KISH AIR |
- Founded: December 16, 1989; 36 years ago
- Commenced operations: 1990; 36 years ago
- Hubs: Kish International Airport; Mashhad Shahid Hasheminejad International Airport; Tehran Mehrabad International Airport
- Fleet size: 9
- Destinations: 27
- Parent company: Kish Free Zone Organization
- Headquarters: Kish Island, Persian Gulf, Iran
- Key people: Cap. Ebrahim Siyahjani (CEO)
- Website: Kishairlines.ir

Kish Airlines (Persian: هواپیمایی کیش, Havâpeymâyi-ye Kiš) is an airline operating from Kish Island, Iran. It operates international, domestic and charter services as a scheduled carrier. Its main bases are Kish International Airport and Mehrabad International Airport, Tehran.

== History ==
The airline was established on December 16, 1989, and started operations in 1990. It is owned by Kish Free Zone Organisation (79%), Kish Investment and Development (11%) and Kish Development and Servicing (10%).

To start its passenger operations, after receiving temporary operations permission, the airline leased two aircraft (three Tupolev Tu-154 and four McDonnell Douglas MD-82/MD-83) from Bulgaria Airlines on a wet lease. Kish Air received its air operator certificate (AOC) in 1991, thus becoming the first private company to receive its AOC from Civil Aviation of Iran. At this time the company began wet-leasing three Tupolev Tu-154Ms from Russian leasing companies, returning the previously leased Bulgarian aircraft. The company also wet-leased two Yakovlev Yak-42D aircraft from Russia.

Towards the end of 1992, the company was at the verge of bankruptcy, and most of the key managers were replaced. In 1999, Kish Air having enough financial strength, decided to replace its wet-leased fleet with dry leased and purchased aircraft, and was able to operate two dry leased and two purchased Tupolev Tu-154 aircraft and hire and train the required aircrew and maintenance personnel.

Its Tu-154 fleet was retired between this time.

In February of 2017 Kish Air was bound to receive its E195 fleet.In August of 2017 Kish Air reportedly had a deal for 10 737 MAX aircraft that were never delivered, and also looked to obtain six repossessed A320 aircraft. In July of 2017 Kish Air made plans to fly to Yerevan. In 2018 Kish Air had plans to fly seasonally between Shiraz and Belgrade. In 2018 it also made a return to the Omani city of Muscat. In 2022 the airline returned to Afghanistan serving the city of Kabul. Officials announced that Kish Air was going to be privatized in the first half of 2023 .In March of 2024 Kish Air bought an MD 82 from Kam Air of Afghanistan. In March of 2025 Kish Air began operating flights to Dushanbe. In March of 2026 the airline owner reportedly protested the privatization of the airline.

== Destinations ==
As of September 2023, Kish Air operates services to the following destinations:

| Country | City | Airport | Notes | Refs |
|---|---|---|---|---|
| Iran | Abadan | Ayatollah Jami International Airport | | |
| Iran | Ahvaz | Qasem Soleimani International Airport | | |
| Iran | Asaluyeh | Persian Gulf Airport | | |
| Iran | Bandar Abbas | Bandar Abbas International Airport | | |
| Iran | Chabahar | Chabahar Konarak Airport | | |
| Iran | Gorgan | Gorgan Airport | | |
| Iran | Isfahan | Shahid Beheshti International Airport | | |
| Iran | Kish | Kish International Airport | Hub | |
| Iran | Lamerd | Lamerd International Airport | | |
| Iran | Mashhad | Shahid Hasheminejad International Airport | Hub | |
| Iran | Qeshm | Qeshm Airport | | |
| Iran | Rasht | Rasht Airport | | |
| Iran | Sari | Dasht-e Naz Airport | | |
| Iran | Shiraz | Shahid Dastgheib International Airport | | |
| Iran | Tabriz | Shahid Madani International Airport | | |
| Iran | Tehran | Imam Khomeini International Airport | Hub | |
| Iran | Tehran | Mehrabad International Airport | Hub | |
| Iran | Yazd | Shahid Sadooghi Airport | | |
| Iran | Zahedan | Zahedan Airport | | |
| Iraq | Najaf | Al Najaf International Airport | | |
| Kazakhstan | Aktau | Aktau International Airport | | |
| Kazakhstan | Almaty | Almaty International Airport | | |
| Oman | Muscat | Muscat International Airport | | |
| Tajikistan | Dushanbe | Dushanbe International Airport | | |
| Turkey | Istanbul | Istanbul Airport | | |
| United Arab Emirates | Dubai | Dubai International Airport | | |

== Fleet ==
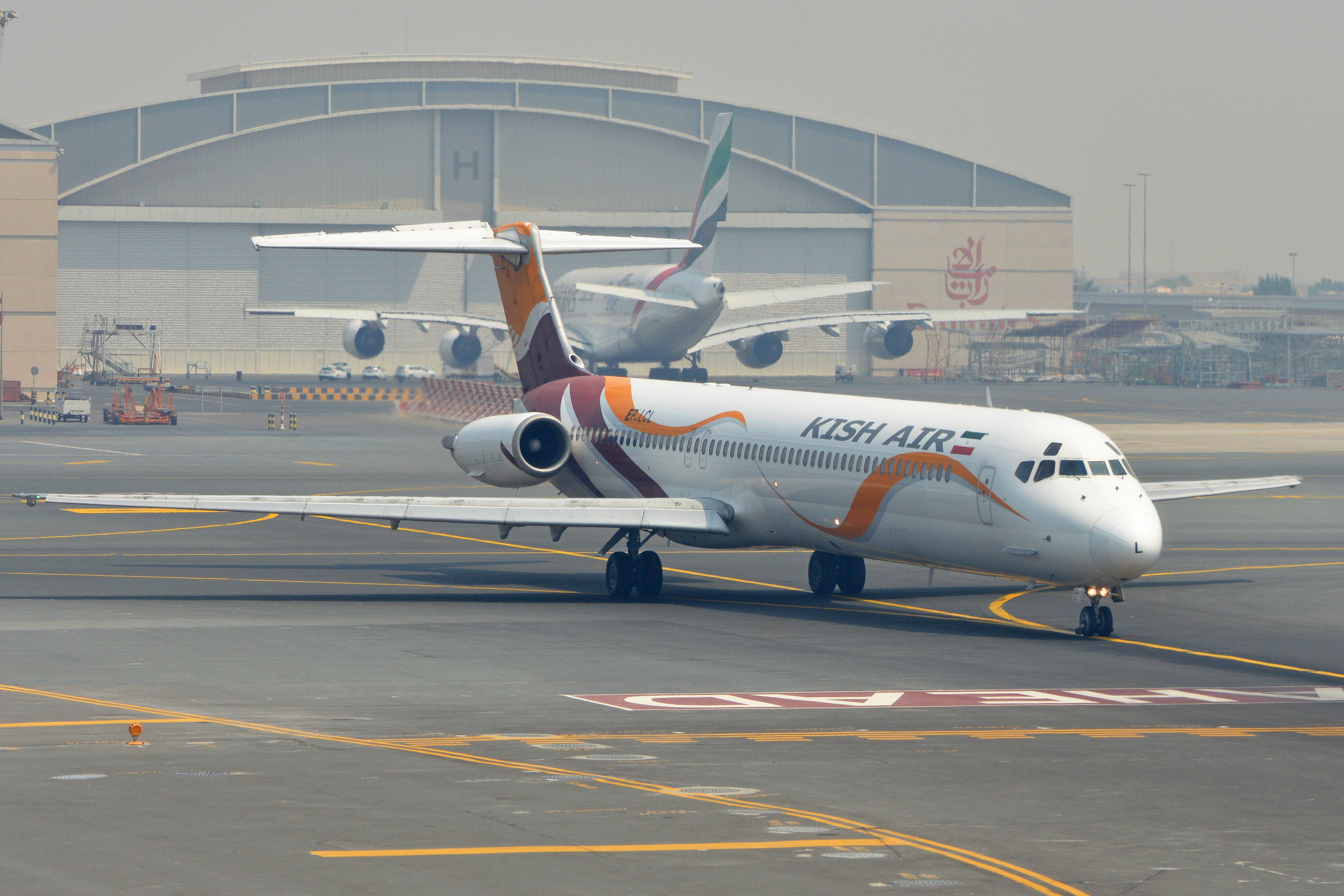
Kish Air McDonnell Douglas MD-82 at Dubai International Airport

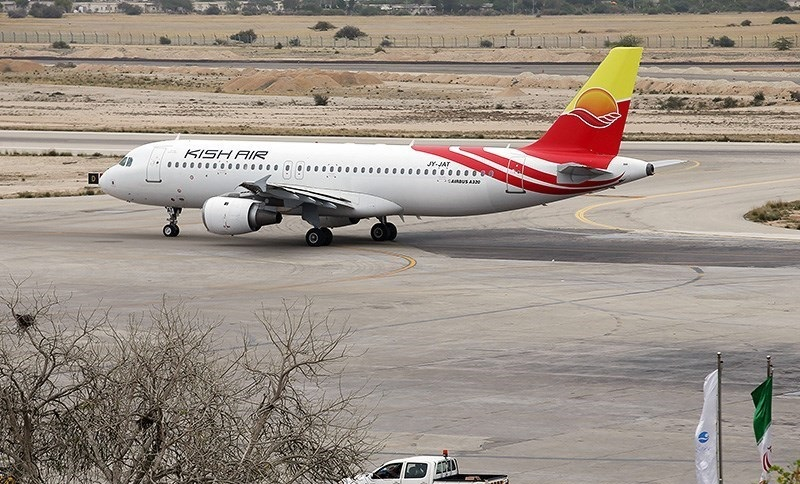
Kish Air Airbus A320 at Mehrabad Airport, Tehran

=== Current fleet ===
As of July 2026, Kish Air operates the following aircraft:

Kish Air fleet
| Aircraft | In service | Order | Passengers | | | Notes |
| Aircraft | In service | Order | C | Y | Total | Notes |
|---|---|---|---|---|---|---|
| Airbus A321 | 2 | — | 28 | 142 | 170 | |
| Airbus A321 | 2 | — | 28 | 142 | 170 | |
| Fokker 100 | 1 | — | — | 100 | 100 | |
| McDonnell Douglas MD-82 | 4 | — | — | 161 | 161 | |
| McDonnell Douglas MD-83 | 2 | — | — | 156 | 156 | |
| Total | 9 | — | | | | |

=== Fleet development ===
In April 2017, it was announced that the airline planned to order six aircraft from ATR, with variant and delivery dates announced if, and when, the deal is signed by the airline. The aircraft were planned to be used to increase the number of flights on domestic flights in Iran.

=== Former fleet ===
As of August 2025, Kish Air operated 2 Airbus A321, 1 Fokker 100, 4 McDonnell Douglas MD-82 and 2 McDonnell Douglas MD-83.

The airline also previously operated the following aircraft (at November 2017):

- 2 Airbus A320 leased from Jordan Aviation
- 1 Boeing 737-500 leased from Bukovyna Airlines
- 7 Fokker 50

== Accidents and incidents ==
- On 19 September 1995, Kish Air Flight 707 was hijacked by flight attendant Reza Jabbari and landed in Israel, where the hijacker was arrested. Jabbari requested asylum and declared his intention of converting to Judaism. Sentenced to eight years in prison, he served four years but was granted asylum and remained in Israel. He eventually became an Israeli citizen and converted to Judaism.
- On 10 February 2004, Kish Air Flight 7170, operated by a Fokker 50 Mk.050, crashed at Sharjah International Airport killing 43 people. There were three survivors with serious injuries. The cause was that the propellers were put into reverse pitch while the aircraft was in flight.

== See also ==
- List of airlines of Iran
