= Caspian Airlines =

Airline in Iran

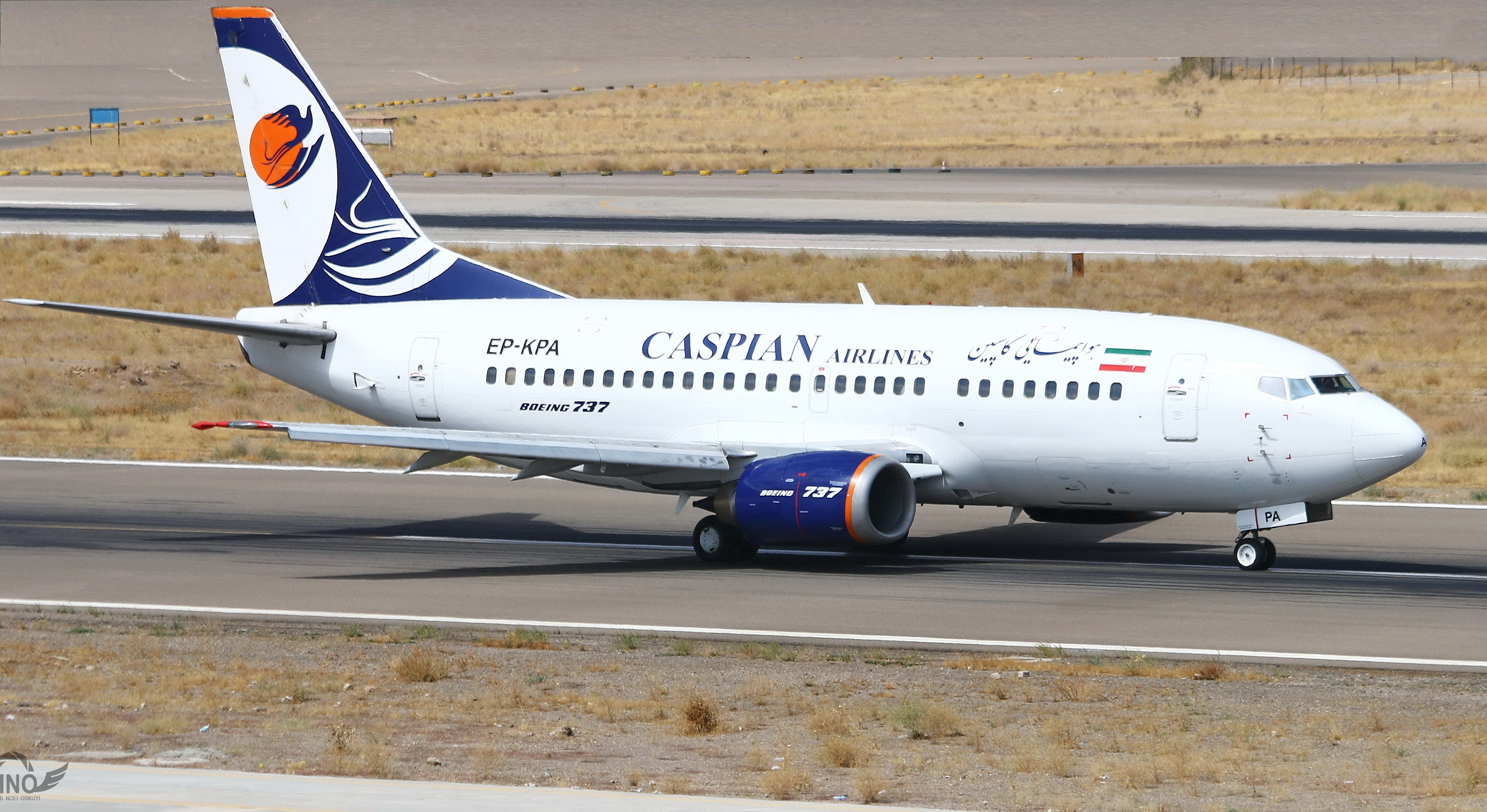
- Caspian Airlines Boeing 737-500
IATA	ICAO	Call sign
N/A	CPN	CASPIAN
- Founded: 1993; 33 years ago
- Hubs: Mashhad Shahid Hasheminejad International Airport; Tehran Imam Khomeini International Airport; Tehran Mehrabad Airport
- Fleet size: 13
- Destinations: 22
- Parent company: Iran National Airlines Corporation
- Headquarters: Tehran, Iran
- Website: https://www.caspianairlines.com

Caspian Airlines (Persian: هواپیمایی کاسپین, Havâpeymâyi-ye Kâspian) is an airline headquartered in the Iranian capital of Tehran. Established in 1993, it operates services between Tehran and other major cities in Iran as well as international flights to Turkey and Iraq. Its main base is Mehrabad International Airport, Tehran.

As of December 2016, Caspian Airlines is sanctioned by the US Department of Treasury for providing support to IRGC elements by transporting personnel and illicit material, including weapons, from Iran to Syria.

== History ==
The airline was established in 1993 and commenced operations in September 1993. It was set up as a joint venture between Iranian and Russian interests. Caspian Airlines finished building its headquarters in 1993. Later this tower was exchanged with three Tupolev-154s from Mahan Air.

In 2016 the US Department of Treasury sanctioned Caspian for transporting IRGC related weapons and illicit material.

In 2019 Caspian Air and Taban Air grew their Boeing 737 fleets.

On December 8, 2025, it was reported that Caspian Airlines had begun flying to Sharjah which opened routes to a total of 5 Iranian cities. On January 23 2026 a Caspian Airlines flight to Yerevan was cancelled six times in 8 days.

== Destinations ==
Country	City	Airport	Notes	Refs
Iran	Abadan	Ayatollah Jami International Airport		
Iran	Ahvaz	Qasem Soleimani International Airport		
Iran	Asaluyeh	Persian Gulf Airport		
Iran	Bandar Abbas	Bandar Abbas International Airport		
Iran	Bushehr	Bushehr Airport		
Iran	Chabahar	Chabahar Konarak Airport		
Iran	Isfahan	Shahid Beheshti International Airport		
Iran	Jask	Jask Airport		
Iran	Kerman	Ayatollah Hashemi Rafsanjani Airport		
Iran	Kish	Kish International Airport		
Iran	Mashhad	Shahid Hasheminejad International Airport	Hub	
Iran	Qeshm	Qeshm International Airport		
Iran	Rasht	Rasht Airport		
Iran	Sari	Dasht-e Naz Airport		
Iran	Shiraz	Shahid Dastgheib International Airport		
Iran	Tabriz	Shahid Madani International Airport		
Iran	Tehran	Imam Khomeini International Airport	Hub	
Iran	Tehran	Mehrabad International Airport	Hub	
Iran	Yazd	Shahid Sadooghi Airport		
Iran	Zahedan	Zahedan Airport		
Iraq	Baghdad	Baghdad International Airport		
Iraq	Najaf	Al Najaf International Airport		
Turkey	Istanbul	Istanbul Airport		
UAE	Sharjah	Sharjah International Airport		

== Fleet ==
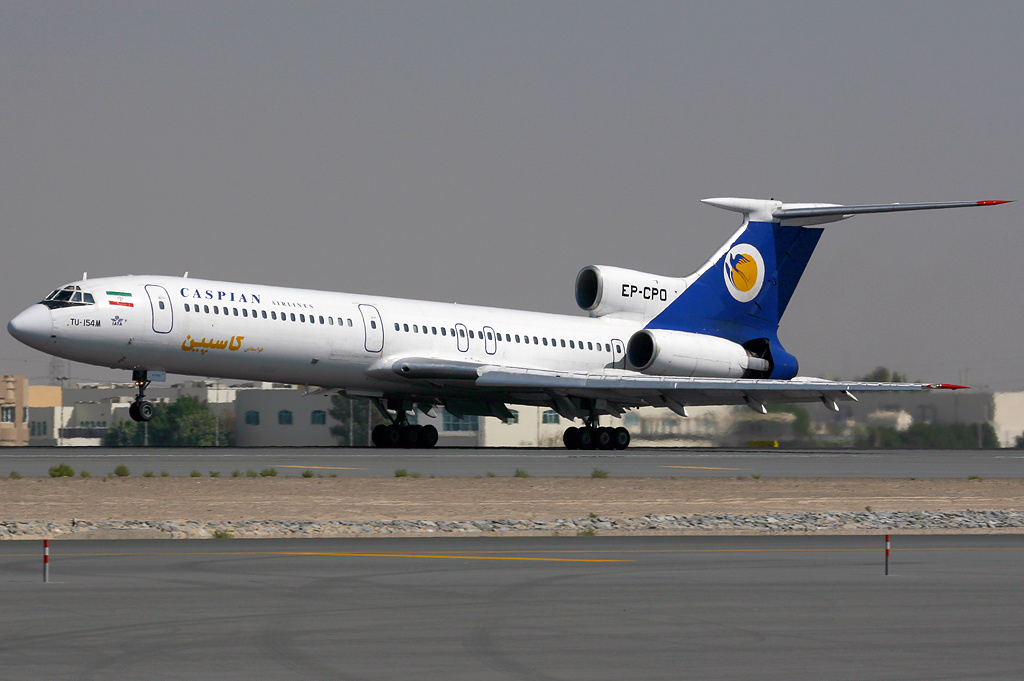
Caspian Airlines Tupolev Tu-154M in 2011

=== Current fleet ===
As of July 2026, Caspian Airlines operates the following aircraft:

Caspian Airlines Fleet
Aircraft	In service	Orders	Passengers	Notes
Boeing 737-300	2	—	140	
Boeing 737-400	3	—	168	
Boeing 737-500	3	—	126	
McDonnell Douglas MD-82	1	—	168	
McDonnell Douglas MD-83	4	—	168	
Total	13	2		

=== Former fleet ===
As of August 2025, Caspian Airlines operated 1 Boeing 737-300, 3 Boeing 737-400, 3 Boeing 737-500 and 5 McDonnell Douglas MD-83.

The airline also previously operated the following aircraft:

- 1 Boeing 737-500, leased from Khors Aircompany
- 1 Boeing 737-300
- 2 McDonnell Douglas-82
- 2 McDonnell Douglas-83
- ? Tupolev Tu-154

== Accidents and incidents ==
- On 15 July 2009, Caspian Airlines Flight 7908, a Tupolev Tu-154M, traveling from Tehran to Yerevan crashed near the Iranian town of Qazvin, killing all 168 people (153 passengers, 15 crew) on board.
- On 27 January 2020, Caspian Airlines Flight 6936, a McDonnell Douglas MD-83 (registered EP-CPZ) suffered a runway excursion at Bandar Mahshahr Airport, Iran. The aircraft came to a stop on a road, injuring 2 of the 144 passengers and crew on board.
- On April 12, 2021, a Caspian Airlines McDonnell Douglas MD-83 performing Flight 6984 from Tehran to Kish rose above its assigned altitude due to an autopilot malfunction. As a result, a Qatar Airways Airbus A350 operating Flight 739, en route from Doha to Los Angeles received a traffic collision avoidance system alert and performed an evasive climb. The Aviation Herald claimed the Qatar jet produced automated warnings about its speed and an impending stall, something Qatar Airways denied. Both aircraft continued to their destinations and landed safely.
- On January 5, 2022, Caspian Airlines Flight 6904, a Boeing 737-400 (registration EP-CAP) veered off the runway during landing at Isfahan International Airport following a collapse of the left main landing gear, injuring five of the 116 people on board.

== See also ==
- List of airlines of Iran
