= Dayrestan =

Dayrestan ديرستان
- Village
- Location within Iran
- Coordinates: 26°44′47″N 55°56′06″E
- Country: Iran
- Province: Hormozgan
- County: Qeshm
- Bakhsh: Shahab
- Rural District: Suza

Population (2006)
  - Total: 1,453
- Time zone: UTC+3:30 (IRST)

Dayrestan (Persian: ديرستان, also Romanized as Dayrestān) is a village in Suza Rural District, Shahab District, Qeshm County, Hormozgan Province, Iran. At the 2006 census, its population was 1,453, in 294 families. The village suffered heavily in the 2005 Qeshm earthquake.

== See also ==
- Qeshm International Airport
