= Isfahan Shahid Beheshti International Airport =

Isfahan Shahid Beheshti International Airport فرودگاه بین‌المللی شهید بهشتی اصفهان

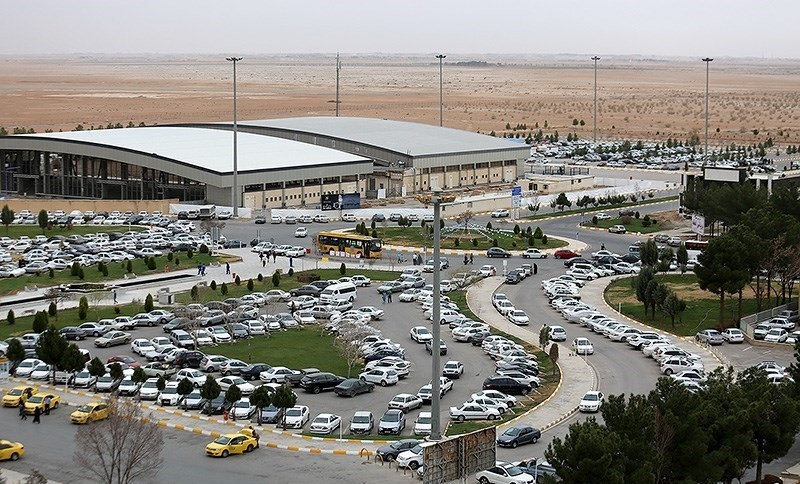
- IATA: IFN; ICAO: OIFM

Summary
- Airport type: Public/military
- Owner: Government of Iran
- Operator: Iran Airports Company; Iranian Air Force
- Serves: Isfahan
- Location: Isfahan, Iran
- Hub for: Iran Aseman Airlines
- Focus city for: Asa Jet; Iran Air; Karun Airlines; Pars Air; Qeshm Air
- Elevation AMSL: 5,059 ft (1,542 m)
- Coordinates: 32°45′03″N 51°51′40″E
- Website: esfahan.airport.ir

Map
- Location of airport in Iran

Runways
Direction	Length		Surface
Direction	ft	m	Surface
07R/25L	14,425	4,397	Asphalt
07L/25R	14,425	4,397	Asphalt

Statistics (2017)
- Passengers: 2,784,616 ▲7%
- Aircraft movements: 24,269 ▲5%
- Cargo: 25,695 tons ▲6%
- Source: Iran Airports Company

Isfahan Shahid Beheshti International Airport (IATA: IFN, ICAO: OIFM) (Persian: فرودگاه بین‌المللی شهید بهشتی اصفهان) is an international airport serving the city of Isfahan, Iran.

== History ==
It is the oldest airport in the country. The original terminal was located in Soffeh and some commercial flights were moved after the new terminal was built, it is located 18.5 kilometers east of Isfahan, in a desert area at an altitude of 1,542 meters above sea level, covering 1,315 hectares. It began operations in 1982 to handle passenger flights and provide pilot training.

== Overview ==
The airport is named in honor of Shahid Beheshti. For administrative and census purposes, it is considered a village in Qahab-e Shomali Rural District, in the Central District of Isfahan County, Isfahan province, Iran. The airport has two terminals, one for domestic flights and one for international flights.

Just adjacent to the airport is Khatami Air Base, which was built in the 1970s specifically to cater to Iran's fleet of F-14 Tomcats.

== Airlines and destinations ==
Airlines	Destinations
Asa Jet	Abadan, Chabahar/Konarak, Mashhad, Qeshm, Rasht, Tehran–Mehrabad
ATA Airlines	Kish, Mashhad, Najaf (suspended), Qeshm, Tabriz, Tehran–Mehrabad
AVA Airlines	Kish, Mashhad
Caspian Airlines	Asaluyeh, Kish, Mashhad, Najaf (suspended), Tehran–Mehrabad
Chabahar Airlines	Mashhad, Tehran–Mehrabad
Flydubai	Dubai–International
Fly Kish	Mashhad
FlyPersia	Kish, Mashhad, Qeshm, Tehran–Mehrabad
Iran Air	Bandar Abbas, Dubai–International, Kuwait City, Mashhad, Najaf (suspended), Tehran–Mehrabad; Seasonal: Jeddah, Medina
Iran Airtour	Mashhad, Tehran–Mehrabad
Iran Aseman Airlines	Abadan, Ahvaz, Mashhad, Najaf (suspended), Rasht, Sari, Tehran–Mehrabad
Iraqi Airways	Baghdad, Najaf
Karun Airlines	Ahvaz, Asaluyeh, Bahregan, Bandar Abbas, Kharg, Lavan, Mahshahr, Mashhad, Sirri Island, Tehran–Mehrabad
Kish Air	Asaluyeh, Bandar Abbas, Kish, Mashhad, Tehran–Mehrabad; Seasonal: Najaf (suspended)
Mahan Air	Asaluyeh, Kerman, Mashhad, Tabriz, Tehran–Mehrabad, Zahedan
Meraj Airlines	Asaluyeh, Kish, Mashhad, Najaf (suspended), Qeshm, Tehran–Mehrabad
Pars Air	Aghajari, Asaluyeh, Chabahar/Konarak, Kish, Mashhad, Najaf (suspended), Qeshm, Shiraz, Tehran–Mehrabad
Pouya Air	Tehran–Mehrabad
Qatar Airways	Doha
Qeshm Air	Dubai–International, Kharg, Kish, Mashhad, Najaf (suspended), Qeshm, Tehran–Mehrabad
Saha Airlines	Asaluyeh, Kish, Mashhad, Tehran–Mehrabad
Sepehran Airlines	Mashhad
Taban Air	Mashhad, Tehran–Mehrabad
Varesh Airlines	Kish, Mashhad, Muscat, Najaf (suspended), Qeshm, Sari, Tehran–Mehrabad
Yazd Airways	Qeshm, Tehran–Mehrabad
Zagros Airlines	Ahvaz, Kish, Mashhad, Najaf (suspended), Tehran–Mehrabad

== Accidents and incidents ==
- On 15 February 1965, a Vickers Viscount EP-AHC operated by Iranian Airlines was damaged beyond economic repair when the port undercarriage collapsed as a result of a heavy landing.
- On 18 November 2009, Iran Air Fokker 100 EP-CFO suffered an undercarriage malfunction on take-off. The aircraft was on a flight to Mehrabad Airport, Tehran when the undercarriage failed to retract. The aircraft landed at Isfahan but was substantially damaged when the left main gear collapsed.
- On 15 January 2010, Iran Air Fokker 100 EP-IDA, operating Flight 223 was substantially damaged when the nose gear collapsed after landing.
- On 24 January 2010, Taban Air Flight 6437, a Tupolev Tu-154M, crashed whilst making an emergency landing at Mashhad International Airport due to a medical emergency; all 157 and 13 crew survived the accident, with 42 receiving minor injuries. The flight originated from Abadan the day before but had to overnight stop in Isfahan due to weather in Mashhad.

== See also ==
- List of the busiest airports in Iran
