= Kish International Airport =

International Airport In Kish Island, Iran

Kish International Airport فرودگاه بین المللی جزیره کیش
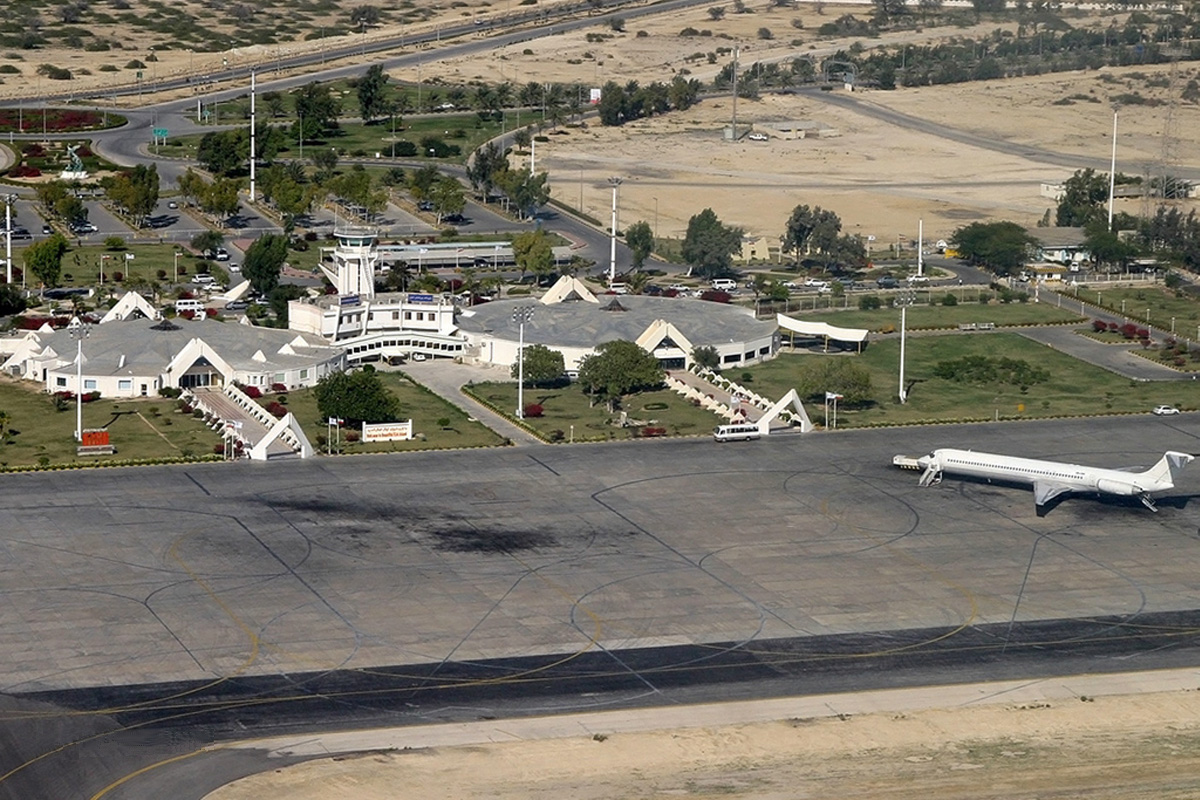
- IATA: KIH; ICAO: OIBK

Summary
- Airport type: Public
- Owner: Kish Free Zone Organization
- Operator: Iran Airports Company
- Serves: Kish, Hormozgan
- Location: Kish Island, Iran
- Hub for: Kish Air
- Elevation AMSL: 101 ft (31 m)
- Coordinates: 26°31′34.16″N 053°58′48.76″E
- Website: kishairport.ir

Map
- Location of airport in Iran

Runways
Direction	Length		Surface
Direction	ft	m	Surface
09L/27R	12,005	3,659	Asphalt
09R/27L	12,005	3,659	Asphalt

Statistics (2017)
- Aircraft movements: 23,776 ▼1%
- Passengers: 2,926,752 ▲4%
- Cargo: 32,344 tons ▲4%
- Source: Iran Airports Company

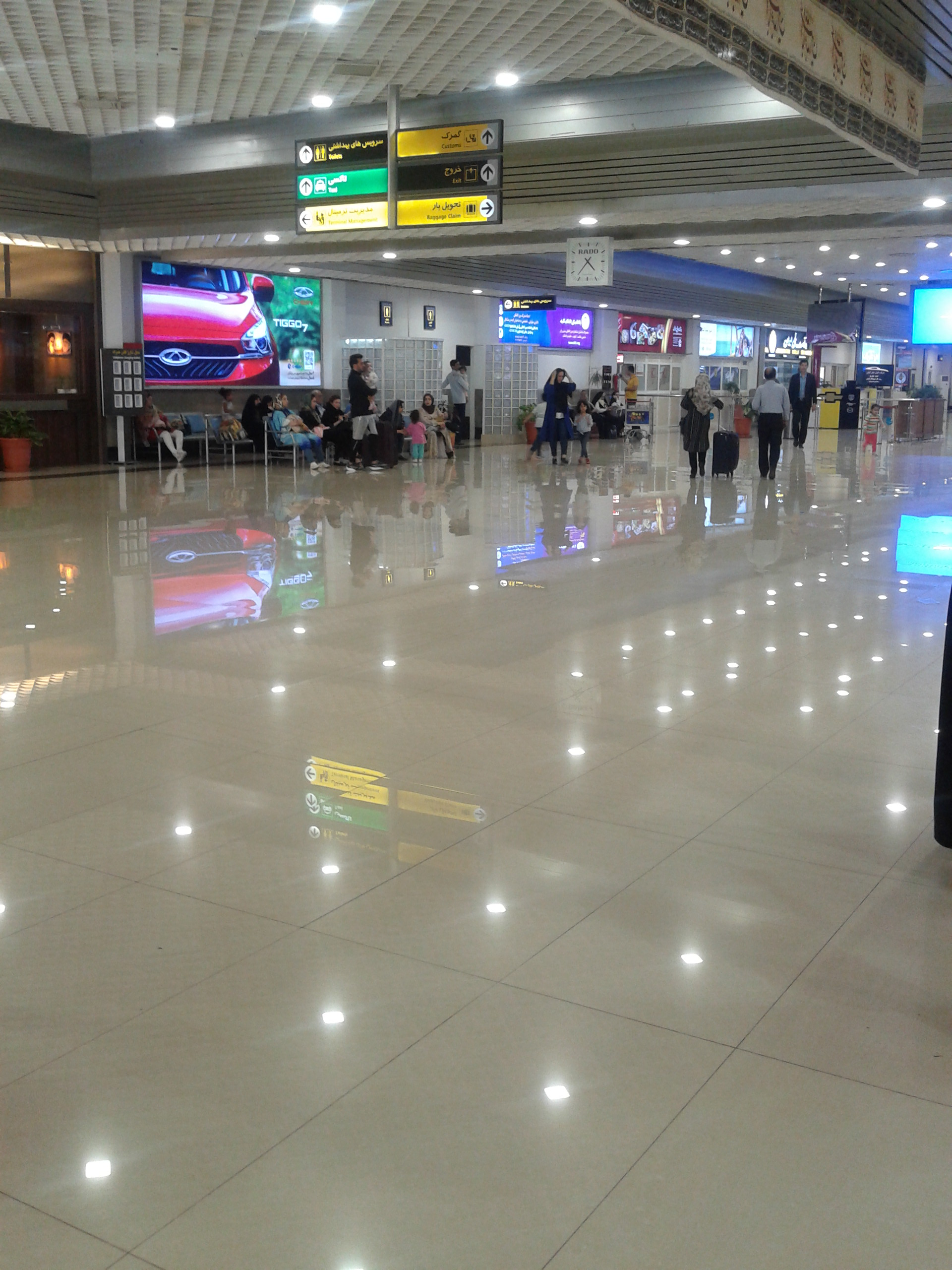
Kish International Airport - 2019

Kish International Airport (IATA: KIH, ICAO: OIBK) (Persian: فرودگاه بین المللی کیش, Foroudgâh-e Beyn Almelali-ye Kish) is an international airport on Kish Island, Iran.

== Description ==
The Kish International Airport serves as the entry point for the hundreds of thousands of tourists who come to Kish Island. The airport grants 14-day visa-free entry to foreign citizens who enter from a foreign country under a different scheme from that of mainland Iran.

Prior to the Iranian Revolution, Iran had an outstanding order for two Concorde aircraft. These aircraft were supposed to be used on Kish-Paris and Kish-London routes to serve the luxury tourism market that Kish was supposed to serve. The airport had been designed to handle the Concorde's landings and take-offs.

== History ==
In the 1980s, the Kish Free Zone Organisation (KFZO) was created. It offered visa-free travels to the islands for foreigners, and 15-year tax exemptions to foreign investors. The plan was to compete with Dubai's attractiveness for international business. The plan failed as the airport was mainly served by Iranian airlines. It became mainly used by Iranians coming to enjoy the looser rules of the island.

In 1998, the 11-month construction of Terminal 5 started, covering a 5,500 square meters area, with a budget of RIs 2,245 million financed by the Organization of Kish Free Trade Zone (FTZ).

In 2015, a new terminal was planned that would turn Kish International Airport into the second-largest airport of the country with a 4.5 million passengers capacity per year. 2.7 million passengers travelled through the airport that year.

In March 2026, during the 2026 Iran War, it was reported by Iran International that a military strike had been carried out on the airport of Kish Island.

== Operational departments ==
Air Traffic Service and Aviation Electronics are two major departments of Kish Airport responsible for aeronautical operations services.

== Airlines and destinations ==
Airlines	Destinations
Air1Air	Tehran–Mehrabad
Asa Jet	Tehran–Mehrabad
ATA Airlines	Isfahan, Mashhad, Shiraz, Tabriz, Tehran–Mehrabad, Yazd
AVA Airlines	Isfahan, Kermanshah, Mashhad, Tehran–Mehrabad
Caspian Airlines	Gorgan, Isfahan, Mashhad, Shiraz, Tehran–Mehrabad
Chabahar Airlines	Shiraz, Tehran–Mehrabad
flydubai	Dubai–International
FlyPersia	Isfahan, Mashhad, Shiraz, Tehran–Mehrabad
Iran Air	Asaluyeh, Bandar Abbas, Shiraz, Tehran–Mehrabad
Iran Airtour	Mashhad, Rasht, Shiraz, Tabriz, Tehran–Mehrabad
Iran Aseman Airlines	Mashhad, Shiraz, Tehran–Mehrabad
Iraqi Airways	Baghdad
Kish Air	Abadan, Ahvaz, Asaluyeh, Bandar Abbas, Dubai–International, Gorgan, Isfahan, Kerman, Mashhad, Rasht, Sari, Shiraz, Tabriz, Tehran–Mehrabad, Urmia, Yazd, Zahedan, Zanjan; Seasonal: Najaf; Seasonal charter: Dushanbe
Mahan Air	Kerman, Mashhad, Tehran–Mehrabad
Meraj Airlines	Isfahan, Mashhad, Tehran–Mehrabad
Pars Air	Abadan, Ahvaz, Isfahan, Shiraz, Tehran–Mehrabad, Yazd
Qeshm Air	Ahvaz, Bandar Abbas, Isfahan, Shiraz, Tehran–Mehrabad
Saha Airlines	Isfahan, Shiraz, Tehran–Mehrabad
Sepehran Airlines	Mashhad, Tehran–Mehrabad
Taban Air	Baghdad, Mashhad, Najaf, Shiraz, Tehran–Mehrabad
Varesh Airlines	Isfahan, Mashhad, Rasht, Sari, Tehran–Mehrabad
Yazd Airways	Yazd
Zagros Airlines	Ahvaz, Isfahan, Mashhad, Tehran–Mehrabad

== Iran Kish Air Show ==
The Kish International Airport is the main host of the Iran Kish Air Show, the aviation airshow held biennially.

== See also ==
- Transport in Iran
- List of airports in Iran
- List of the busiest airports in Iran
- List of the busiest airports in the Middle East
