= Al Najaf International Airport =

Najaf International Airport

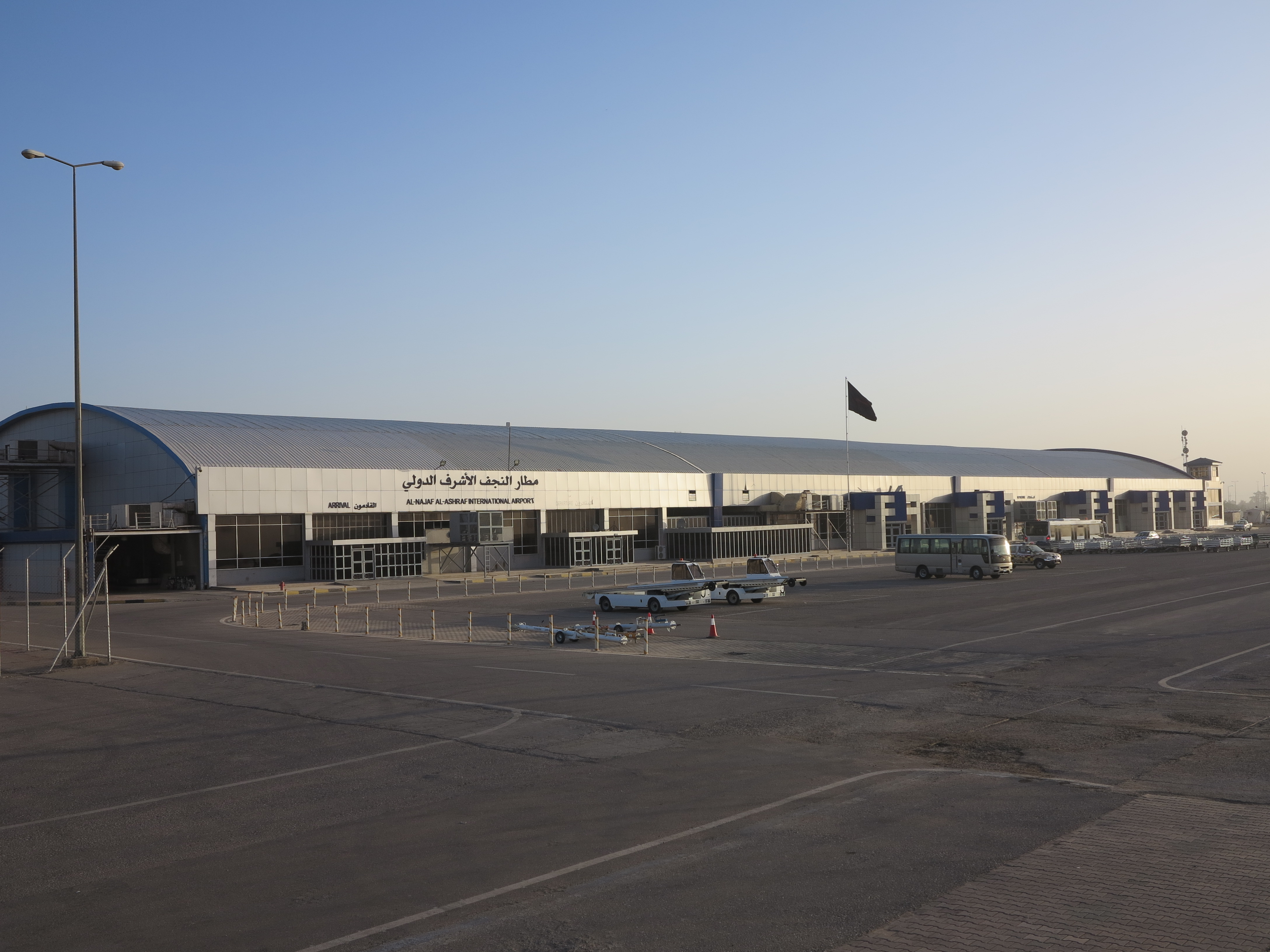
- IATA: NJF; ICAO: ORNI

Summary
- Airport type: Private
- Operator: Najaf Airport Authority
- Serves: Najaf, Iraq
- Hub for: Iraqi Airways; UR Airlines
- Elevation AMSL: 103 ft (31 m)
- Coordinates: 31°59′23″N 44°24′15″E
- Website: airport.online/alnajaf-airport

Maps
- Location of airport in Iraq
- Interactive map of Najaf International Airport

Runways
Direction	Length		Surface
Direction	ft	m	Surface
10/28	9,842	3,000	Asphalt

Statistics (2022)
- Passengers: 2,686,074
- Aircraft operations: 23,327
- Source: ICAA, COSIT.

Najaf International Airport (IATA: NJF; ICAO: ORNI) is an international airport serving Najaf, Iraq, and is located on the eastern side of the city. Formerly a military airbase, the airport consists of one asphalt runway, measuring 3,000 metres (9,800 ft) long and 45 metres (148 ft) wide. The airport is expanding to provide four departure gates, two arrival gates, immigration and passenger services.

== History ==
On 20 July 2008 the Najaf Authorities hosted the ceremonial opening attended by the Iraqi Prime Minister Nouri Al-Maliki who stepped out of the first official plane.

The Najaf Governorate represented by the Deputy Governor Abd al-Husayn Abtan and Najaf Investment Commission signed a Memorandum of Agreement dated 24 June 2008 with Al-Aqeelah Holding authorizing it for one year to finalize the construction of the airport and five years subject to renewal to manage the airport. Currently Aqeeq Aviation Holding a subsidiary of Al-Aqeelah Holding is overseeing this.

The construction phase comprises the construction of the VIP lounge, Arrival and Departure Halls, Taxiway, Air cargo, purchasing all airport equipments including Ground Handling Equipments, technical supplies, Navigation Aids, Dining Facilities and lodging sites for employees.

Since 2009, more airlines have begun service to Najaf, including Gulf Air, Middle East Airlines, Qatar Airways, Syrian Air and Turkish Airlines.

== Airlines and destinations ==
Airlines	Destinations
Air Arabia	Sharjah
ATA Airlines	Isfahan, Mashhad, Tabriz, Tehran–Imam Khomeini, Yazd (all flights suspended)
AVA Airlines	Mashhad (suspended)
Caspian Airlines	Isfahan, Mashhad, Tehran–Imam Khomeini (all flights suspended)
Flydubai	Dubai–International
Flynas	Dammam
Gulf Air	Bahrain
Iran Air	Isfahan, Mashhad, Tabriz, Tehran–Imam Khomeini (all flighs suspended)
Iran Airtour	Mashhad, Tabriz, Tehran–Imam Khomeini (all flights suspended)
Iran Aseman Airlines	Isfahan, Mashhad, Shiraz, Tehran–Imam Khomeini (all flights suspended)
Iraqi Airways	Ahmedabad, Baghdad, Bahrain, Beirut, Copenhagen, Erbil, Isfahan, Islamabad, Istanbul, Karachi, Kuwait City, Mashhad, Muscat, Mumbai, Sulaimaniyah, Tehran–Imam Khomeini
Jazeera Airways	Kuwait City
Kam Air	Kabul
Kish Air	Seasonal: Isfahan, Kish, Shiraz, Tehran–Imam Khomeini (all flights suspended)
Kuwait Airways	Kuwait City
Mahan Air	Tehran–Imam Khomeini (suspended)
Meraj Airlines	Isfahan, Mashhad, Tehran–Imam Khomeini (all flights suspended)
Middle East Airlines	Beirut
Pars Air	Kerman, Mashhad, Shiraz (all flights suspended)
Pouya Air	Seasonal: Rasht (suspended)
Qatar Airways	Doha
Qeshm Air	Isfahan, Mashhad, Tehran–Imam Khomeini (all flights suspended)
Royal Jordanian	Amman–Queen Alia
Sepehran Airlines	Mashhad (suspended)
SpiceJet	Charter: Ahmedabad, Mumbai
Taban Air	Kish, Mashhad, Tehran–Imam Khomeini (all flights suspended)
Turkish Airlines	Istanbul (suspended)
UR Airlines	Beirut
Varesh Airlines	Isfahan, Mashhad, Sari, Tehran–Imam Khomeini (all flights suspended)
Zagros Airlines	Isfahan, Mashhad, Tehran–Imam Khomeini; Seasonal: Ardabil (all flights suspended)

== Statistics ==
In 2015 and 2016, Al Najaf International Airport was the busiest airport in Iraq by passenger traffic, but as of 2022 it ranks as the second-busiest, only behind Baghdad International Airport. However, it is still the busiest airport in the country by international passenger traffic.

Year	Passengers		Cargo		Aircraft operations	
Year	Total	%YoY	Tons	%YoY	Movements	%YoY
2015	2,783,444	N.D.	N.D.	N.D.	20,510	N.D.
2016	3,435,783	▲23.4%	5.2	N.D.	27,652	▲34.8%
2017	3,198,043	▼6.9%	7.8	▲50.0%	27,234	▼1.5%
2018	2,793,219	▼12.7%	8.6	▲10.3%	22,835	▼16.2%
2019	1,989,680	▼28.8%	1.6	▼81.4%	18,346	▼19.7%
2020	272,770	▼86.3%	N.D.	▼100.0%	2,836	▼84.6%
2021	885,264	▲224.5%	N.D.	0.0%	8,448	▲197.9%
2022	2,686,074	▲203.4%	24,174.7	N.D.	23,327	▲176.1%

Source: COSIT. Air Transport Activity Statistics, years 2015, 2016, 2017, 2018, 2019, 2020, 2021 and 2022.

== See also ==
- List of airports in Iraq
