= Shiraz Shahid Dastgheib International Airport =

Shiraz International Airport فرودگاه بین‌المللی شیراز
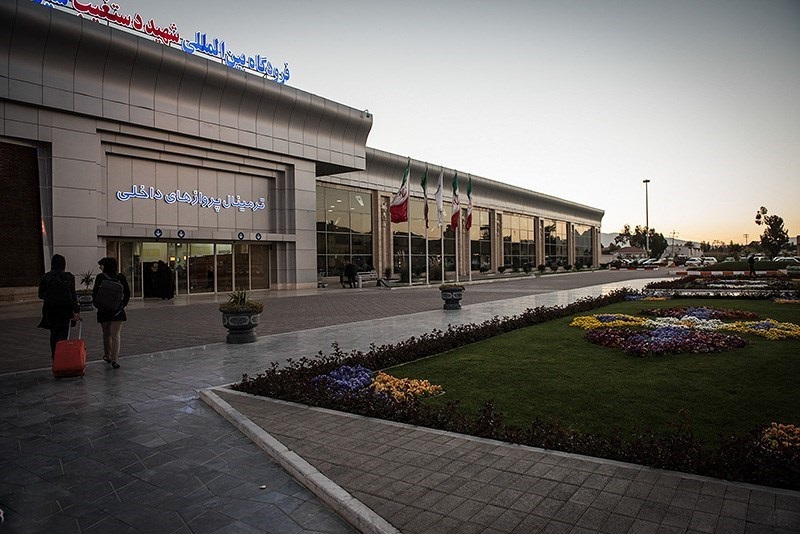
- IATA: SYZ; ICAO: OISS

Summary
- Airport type: Public/military
- Owner: Government of Iran
- Operator: Iran Airports Company; Islamic Republic of Iran Air Force; Islamic Revolutionary Guard Corps; Islamic Republic of Iran Navy Aviation; Iranian Police Aviation
- Serves: Shiraz, Fars
- Location: Shiraz, Iran
- Hub for: FlyPersia; Iran Airtour; Iran Aseman Airlines; Pars Air
- Focus city for: Iran Air; Karun Airlines; Qeshm Air; Taban Air
- Elevation AMSL: 4,920 ft (1,500 m)
- Coordinates: 29°32′21″N 52°35′24″E
- Website: http://shiraz.airport.ir

Maps
- Location of airport in Iran
- Interactive map of Shiraz International Airport

Runways
Direction	Length		Surface
Direction	ft	m	Surface
11R/29L	14,020	4,275	Asphalt
11L/29R	14,225	4,335	Asphalt

Statistics (2017)
- Passengers: 3,530,525 ▲7%
- Aircraft movements: 33,857 ▲9%
- Cargo: 32,982 tons ▲7%
- Source: Iran Airports Company

Shiraz International Airport (IATA: SYZ, ICAO: OISS) (Persian: فرودگاه بین‌المللی شیراز) is an international airport located in Shiraz, Iran. It is the main international airport of Fars province as well as the largest airport in the southern region of Iran.

After undergoing renovation and redevelopment work in 2005, it was identified as the second most reliable and modern airport in Iran, after Tehran Imam Khomeini International Airport, in terms of flight safety, including electronic and navigation control systems of its flight tower.

== Terminals ==
Shiraz International Airport has two main passenger terminals which are connected to each other.

=== Domestic Terminal ===
Domestic Terminal or Terminal 1 is the older and larger than the other terminal, and exclusively handles domestic flights within Iran.

=== International Terminal ===
International Terminal or Terminal 2 is used for all scheduled and charter international flights. An international terminal is under construction for international flights, and was due to be built by 2024. After its completion the current International Terminal will be used for Hajj flights.

== Airlines and destinations ==
The following airlines operate passenger flights at Shiraz International Airport:

Airlines	Destinations
Air1Air	Tehran–Mehrabad
Air Arabia	Sharjah
Asa Jet	Tehran–Mehrabad
ATA Airlines	Kish, Mashhad, Tehran–Mehrabad
AVA Airlines	Tehran–Mehrabad
Caspian Airlines	Asaluyeh, Kish, Mashhad, Tehran–Mehrabad
Chabahar Airlines	Kish, Tehran–Mehrabad
Flydubai	Dubai–International
FlyPersia	Asaluyeh, Bandar Abbas, Chabahar/Konarak, Isfahan, Kish, Mashhad, Qeshm, Tabriz, Tehran–Mehrabad
Iran Air	Bandar Abbas, Bandar Lengeh, Doha, Dubai–International, Kuwait City, Lamerd, Mashhad, Qeshm, Tehran–Mehrabad; Seasonal: Jeddah, Medina
Iran Airtour	Dubai–International, Kish, Mashhad, Tabriz, Tehran–Mehrabad
Iran Aseman Airlines	Abadan, Ahvaz, Bandar Abbas, Kish, Mashhad, Rasht, Sari, Tabriz, Tehran–Mehrabad, Zahedan
Jazeera Airways	Kuwait City
Karun Airlines	Ahvaz, Bahregan, Bandar Abbas, Kharg, Lavan, Mahshahr, Sirri Island, Tehran–Mehrabad
Kish Air	Asaluyeh, Kish, Mashhad, Tehran–Mehrabad
Kuwait Airways	Kuwait City
Mahan Air	Ahvaz, Kerman, Tehran–Mehrabad
Oman Air	Muscat
Pars Air	Aghajari, Ahvaz, Bandar Abbas, Gorgan, Isfahan, Jask, Kermanshah, Kish, Mashhad, Muscat, Najaf (suspended), Sohar, Tabriz, Tehran–Mehrabad
Pouya Air	Bandar Abbas, Rasht, Tehran–Mehrabad
Qatar Airways	Doha
Qeshm Air	Dubai–International, Isfahan, Kharg, Kish, Mashhad, Muscat, Noshahr, Qeshm, Tehran–Mehrabad
Raimon Airways	Rasht
Saha Airlines	Asaluyeh, Chabahar/Konarak, Kish, Lavan, Mashhad, Tehran–Mehrabad
SalamAir	Muscat
Sepehran Airlines	Mashhad, Tehran–Mehrabad
Taban Air	Bandar Abbas, Kish, Mashhad, Muscat, Sohar, Tehran–Mehrabad
Varesh Airlines	Dubai–International, Mashhad, Muscat, Sari, Tehran–Mehrabad
Yazd Airways	Qeshm, Tehran–Mehrabad
Zagros Airlines	Mashhad, Tehran–Mehrabad

== Accidents and incidents ==
- On 15 June 1971, Douglas C-47A EP-ADG of the Air Taxi Co was damaged beyond economic repair in an accident at Shiraz Airport.
- On 14 December 2018, a Boeing 737 MAX 8 LN-BKE, operated by Norwegian Air Shuttle, flight DY 1933, delivered only in October 2018, made a forced landing at Shiraz Airport after a technical failure with one of its two engines. The passengers and crew disembarked and the next day continued their journey originating in Dubai, UAE to Oslo, Norway. Until February 2019, the aircraft had not yet been recovered due to strict technical embargoes by the United States against the state of Iran. By the end of January 2019, the status of LN-BKE had changed to "stored". On 22 February, the aircraft was finally recovered and flown to Sweden. It was then transferred to Norwegian Air Sweden and its registration was then changed to SE-RYB. The aircraft was then stored again when all Boeing 737 MAX's were grounded worldwide.

== See also ==
- Iran Civil Aviation Organization
- Transport in Iran
- List of airports in Iran
- List of the busiest airports in Iran
- List of airlines of Iran
