= Tabriz Shahid Madani International Airport =

Airport in Iran

Tabriz Shahid Madani International Airport فرودگاه بین‌المللی شهید مدنی تبریز
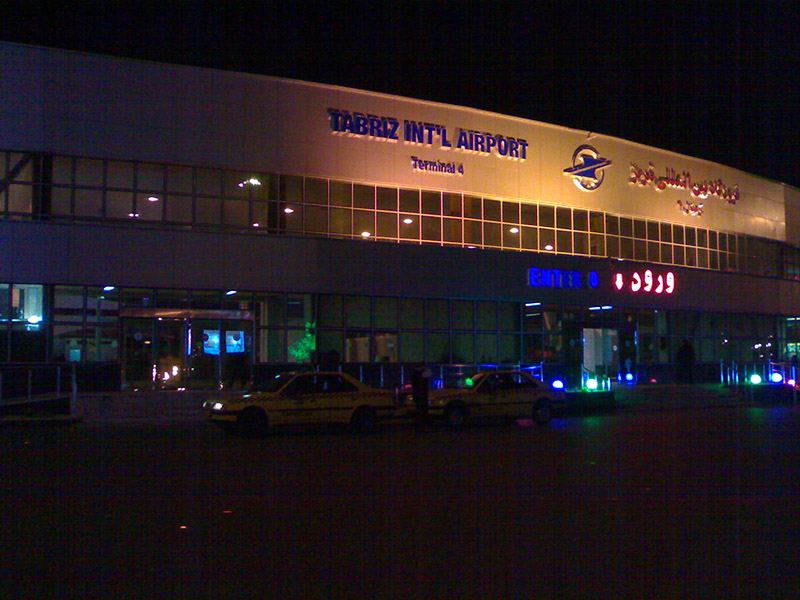
- IATA: TBZ; ICAO: OITT

Summary
- Airport type: Public/military
- Owner: Government of Iran
- Operator: Iran Airports Company; Iranian Air Force
- Serves: Tabriz, East Azarbaijan
- Location: Tabriz, Iran
- Hub for: ATA Airlines; Iran Airtour
- Elevation AMSL: 4,459 ft (1,359 m)
- Coordinates: 38°08′02″N 46°14′06″E
- Website: tabriz.airport.ir

Map
- Location of airport in Iran

Runways
Direction	Length		Surface
Direction	ft	m	Surface
12L/30R	11,995	3,656	Concrete
12R/30L	11,537	3,516	Asphalt

Statistics (2017)
- Aircraft movements: 15,602 ▲10%
- Passengers: 1,942,726 ▲10%
- Cargo: 14,680 tons ▲11%
- Source: Iran Airports Company

Tabriz Shahid Madani International Airport (Persian: فرودگاه بین‌المللی شهید مدنی تبریز) (IATA: TBZ, ICAO: OITT) is an airport that serves the Iranian city of Tabriz. It is the primary airport of this city in the East Azerbaijan province of northwestern Iran. The runway of the airport is also used by Tactical Air Base 2 of the Islamic Republic of Iran Air Force.

The airport has been damaged from Israeli airstrikes on 13 June 2025 leading to a full closure that lasted 23 days. The airport reopened for both domestic and international operations on 5 July 2025.

== Airlines and destinations ==
Airlines	Destinations
Asa Jet	Mashhad, Tehran–Mehrabad, Yerevan
ATA Airlines	Isfahan, Kish, Mashhad, Najaf (suspended), Tehran–Mehrabad
Caspian Airlines	Asaluyeh, Mashhad, Tehran–Mehrabad
Flydubai	Dubai–International
FlyPersia	Shiraz
Iran Air	Baku, Najaf (suspended), Tehran–Mehrabad; Seasonal: Jeddah, Medina
Iran Airtour	Baku, Bandar Abbas, Kish, Mashhad, Najaf (suspended), Shiraz, Tehran–Mehrabad
Iran Aseman Airlines	Shiraz, Tehran–Mehrabad
Karun Airlines	Ahvaz, Tehran–Mehrabad
Kish Air	Bandar Abbas, Kish, Tehran–Mehrabad
Mahan Air	Asaluyeh, Isfahan, Kerman, Tehran–Mehrabad
Meraj Airlines	Asaluyeh, Mashhad, Tehran–Mehrabad
Pars Air	Asaluyeh, Shiraz, Tehran–Mehrabad, Yazd
Pouya Air	Mashhad, Tehran–Mehrabad, Yazd
Qeshm Air	Tehran–Mehrabad
Saha Airlines	Tehran–Mehrabad
Sepehran Airlines	Mashhad, Tehran–Mehrabad
Taban Air	Mashhad, Tehran–Mehrabad
Varesh Airlines	Mashhad, Tehran–Mehrabad
Yazd Airways	Tehran–Mehrabad
Zagros Airlines	Mashhad, Tehran–Mehrabad

== History ==
In June 2025, the airport was damaged in airstrikes during Israel's Operation Rising Lion on 13 June 2025. The focus of the attacks was on military aircraft and aircraft hangars. As of 14 June, the airport is closed and all flights are grounded.

== Accidents and incidents ==
- On 6 June 2018 the Tapandegan (Palpitaters in Persian), an Iranian hacker group, hacked the arrival and departure monitors at Tabriz International Airport, and defaced signboards in the evening, showing a protest message against “wasting Iranians’ resources" and expressing support for Iranian truckers who had been on strike across Iran for several weeks.
- On June 13, 2025, the Israeli Air Force conducted an airstrike targeting the military airbase at Tabriz International Airport as part of Operation Rising Lion. The strike resulted in significant damage to military infrastructure within the airport complex.

== See also ==
- Iran Civil Aviation Organization
- Transport in Iran
- List of airports in Iran
- List of the busiest airports in Iran
- List of airlines of Iran
