= Qasem Soleimani International Airport =

Qasem Soleimani Airport
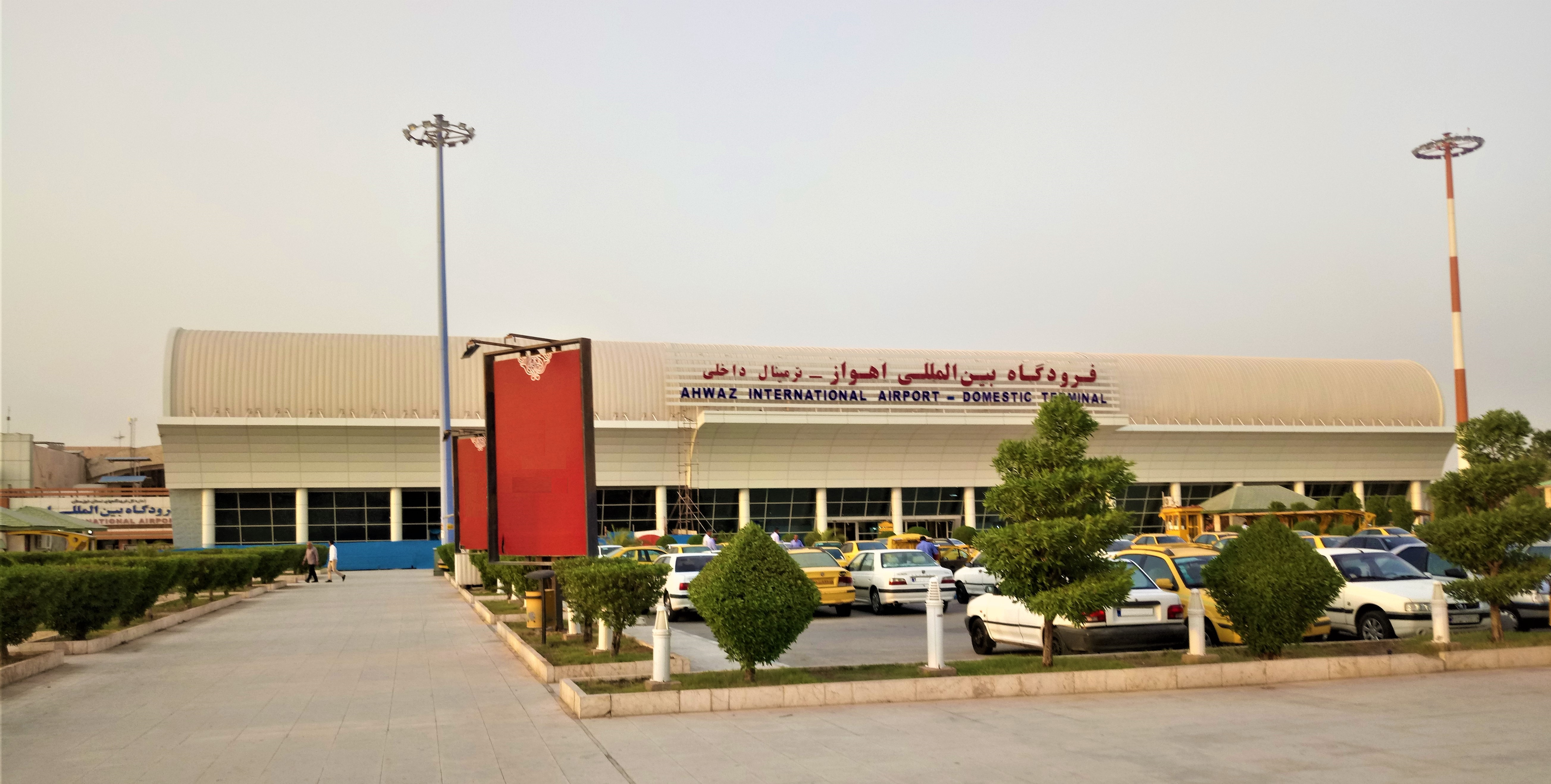
- IATA: AWZ; ICAO: OIAW

Summary
- Airport type: Public
- Owner: Government of Iran
- Operator: Iran Airports Company
- Serves: Ahvaz, Khuzestan
- Location: Ahvaz, Iran
- Hub for: Karun Airlines
- Elevation AMSL: 20 m (66 ft)
- Coordinates: 31°20′15″N 048°45′43″E
- Website: http://ahwaz.airport.ir/

Map
- Location of the airport in Iran

Runways
Direction	Length		Surface
Direction	m	ft	Surface
12/30	3,398	11,148	Asphalt

Statistics (2017)
- Aircraft Movements: 24,449 ▲3%
- Passengers: 2,939,958 ▲10%
- Cargo: 26,312 tons ▲28%
- Source: Iran Airports Company

Qasem Soleimani International Airport formerly known as Ahvaz International Airport (IATA: AWZ, ICAO: OIAW) (Persian: فرودگاه بین‌المللی قاسم سلیمانی) is an airport serving the city of Ahvaz, Iran. It offers flights to domestic destinations as well as regional international destinations, such as Dubai, Kuwait City, Muscat, and Istanbul.

== Airlines and destinations ==
Airlines	Destinations
Air1Air	Tehran–Mehrabad
ATA Airlines	Mashhad, Tehran–Mehrabad
AVA Airlines	Mashhad, Tehran–Mehrabad
Caspian Airlines	Mashhad, Sharjah, Tehran–Mehrabad
FlyPersia	Tehran–Mehrabad
Iran Air	Bandar Abbas, Dubai–International, Mashhad, Tehran–Mehrabad; Seasonal: Jeddah, Medina
Iran Airtour	Mashhad, Tehran–Mehrabad
Iran Aseman Airlines	Isfahan, Mashhad, Sari, Shiraz, Tehran–Mehrabad
Karun Airlines	Asaluyeh, Bandar Abbas, Bushehr, Isfahan, Kharg, Kuwait City, Lamerd, Lavan, Mashhad, Qeshm, Rasht, Shiraz, Sirri Island, Tabriz, Tehran–Mehrabad, Yazd
Kish Air	Kish, Mashhad, Tehran–Mehrabad
Mahan Air	Asaluyeh, Kerman, Shiraz, Tehran–Mehrabad
Pars Air	Kish, Muscat, Shiraz, Tehran–Mehrabad
Pouya Air	Tehran–Mehrabad
Qeshm Air	Dubai–International, Kish, Mashhad, Tehran–Mehrabad
Sepehran Airlines	Mashhad, Tehran–Mehrabad
Taban Air	Mashhad, Tehran–Mehrabad
Varesh Airlines	Mashhad, Tehran–Mehrabad
Zagros Airlines	Isfahan, Kish, Mashhad, Tehran–Mehrabad

== Accidents and incidents ==
On 13 April 1970, Douglas C-47B EP-AGZ of the Air Taxi Co. stalled on take-off and crashed. The aircraft was destroyed by the subsequent fire. It was operating a non-scheduled passenger flight. All 25 people on board survived.

== Airport move and rename ==
In December 2012, Agence France-Presse reported that Ahwaz airport was to be relocated because oil had been discovered underneath it.

In June 2017, Ahwaz Airport measured a record breaking temperature as it hit 129.2 °F (54.0 °C), breaking its previous record of 127.4 °F (53.0 °C).

On January 3, 2020, Ahwaz city officials renamed this facility from Ahvaz International Airport to Qasem Soleimani International Airport, honoring the Iranian General shortly after his death.

== See also ==
- Iran Civil Aviation Organization
- Transport in Iran
- List of airports in Iran
- List of the busiest airports in Iran
- List of airlines of Iran
