= Lavan Airport =

Lavan Airport فرودگاه لاوان
- IATA: LVP; ICAO: OIBV

Summary
- Airport type: Public
- Owner: Government of Iran
- Operator: Iran Airports Company
- Serves: Lavan Island, Hormozgan
- Location: Lavan Island, Iran
- Elevation AMSL: 76 ft / 23 m
- Coordinates: 26°48′37″N 053°21′22″E

Map
- Location of airport in Iran

Runways
Direction	Length		Surface
Direction	m	ft	Surface
11/29	2,077	6,815	Asphalt
- Source: DAFIF

Lavan Island Airport (IATA: LVP, ICAO: OIBV) (Persian: فرودگاه لاوان) is a regional airport located near the city of Lavan, Hormozgan Province, in south of Iran. The airport is used by the Iran Ministry of Petroleum for transferring of employees of Iran Oil Company.

== Airlines and destinations ==
Airlines	Destinations
Karun Airlines	Ahvaz, Isfahan, Shiraz, Tehran–Mehrabad
Saha Airlines	Shiraz, Tehran–Mehrabad
