= List of airlines of Iran =

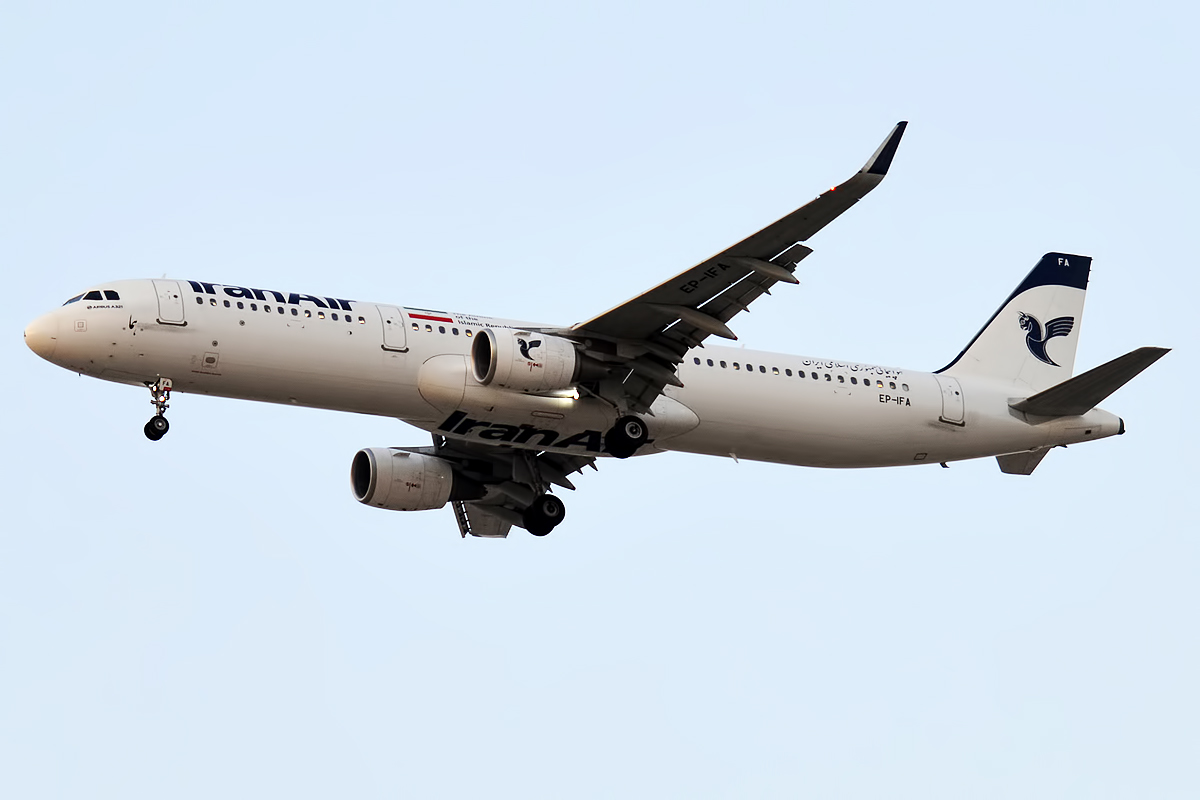
Iran Air A321

Iran has several private and public airline companies in operation. The oldest is the Iranian Airways Company, founded in 1944 (known as Iran Air since 1961).

As of June 2009, Iranian planes fly 45 international flight routes. Most of the fleet of Iranian airlines today consist of old Boeings and used or leased Airbus and regional jets such as British Aerospace 146 and ATR 72 and Fokker 100. Economic sanctions from the United States prevents Iran from purchasing most new western made aircraft to update its rapidly aging fleet. This has resulted in a series of ongoing disasters and incidents. Because of this, in the last 25 years there have been 17 plane crashes, and 1500 deaths (From 2000 to 2006, 11 Iranian plane crashes claimed about 700 lives).

Iran has initiated manufacturing aircraft on its own such as the IR.AN-140. A number of 108 airliners have been added to the fleet of Iranian passenger planes during the last five years. As of July 2015, Iran had 251 commercial planes with 41,218 seats and 6 cargo planes, many (around 100) of which are not functional because of a lack of spare parts. In 2021, Iranian media reported than 50% of Iran's fleet is grounded because of lack of spare parts and other technical problems.

In 2016, Iran announced its intention to buy over 200 heavy airplanes from Boeing and Airbus at a cost of more than $50 billion. This, in addition to more planned orders of 100 medium-range planes to Japan's Mitsubishi, Brazil's Embraer and Canada's Bombardier. Iran says these deals include authorization to maintain these planes inside of Iran, including the production of parts and training.

Iran plans to buy 400 passenger planes by 2025 worth some $20 billion, if US sanctions are lifted.

During the summer of 2023 Iran had a scarcity of available plane tickets.

== Commercial airlines ==
Airline	Image	IATA	ICAO	Callsign	Founded	Hub	Notes
Air1Air		INA	INA	AVICENNA	2023	Tehran–Mehrabad	
Air Parsiana					2025		Planned
Air Shiraz					2025		Planned and sanctioned
Ana Air					2021		
Anna Airlines					2017		
Asa Jet		EP	SJT	ASA JET	2018	Tehran–Mehrabad	
Ardabil Airlines					2022	Ardabil Airport	may be defunct
Arta Airlines					2022		Or Arta Air
Arta Kish Pilot Training Center						Tehran	Flight school
Atlas Air					2011		First Air Taxi in Iran
AVA Airlines			AXV	AVA	2024		
ATA Airlines		I3	TBZ	ATAAIR	2010	Mashhad, Tabriz, Tehran–Imam Khomeini, Tehran–Mehrabad	
Caspian Airlines		RV	CPN	CASPIAN	1993	Mashhad, Tehran–Imam Khomeini, Tehran–Mehrabad	
Chabahar Airlines		-	IRU	CHABAHAR	1999	Tehran–Mehrabad	
Diliran Airlines					2019		
DOT One Airlines					2025		owned by Alibaba bus company
Fly Kish			TKN	TOUCAN	2025		
FlyPersia		FP	FPI	FLYPERSIA	2018	Shiraz, Tehran–Mehrabad	
Ilam Airlines					2013		
Iran Air		IR	IRA	IRANAIR	1961	Tehran–Imam Khomeini, Tehran–Mehrabad	Flag carrier of Iran
Iran Airtour		B9	IRB	AIRTOUR	1973	Mashhad, Shiraz, Tabriz, Tehran–Imam Khomeini, Tehran–Mehrabad	
Iran Aseman Airlines		EP	IRC	ASEMAN	1980	Isfahan, Mashhad, Shiraz, Tehran–Imam Khomeini, Tehran–Mehrabad	
Iranian Helicopter Company					1979		
Jey Air					2021?		
JSKY Airlines		-	ISP	ESPADANA	2025		ACMI Operator
Karun Airlines		NV	IRG	NAFT	1992	Ahvaz, Tehran–Mehrabad	
Kish Air		Y9	IRK	KISHAIR	1989	Kish, Mashhad, Tehran–Mehrabad	
Lad Airways			LMB		2024	Lar Airport	
Mahan Air		W5	IRM	MAHAN AIR	1992	Tehran–Imam Khomeini, Tehran–Mehrabad	Largest Iranian airline.
Makran Airlines					2024		
Mehr Airways			MEH		2025	Tehran	
Meraj Airlines		JI	MRJ	MERAJ	2010	Mashhad, Tehran–Imam Khomeini, Tehran–Mehrabad	Operating for the Government of Iran
Nasim Airlines			NSN		2016 (Commenced in 2025)	Isfahan Shahid Beheshti International Airport	
Navid Air			IRI		1980		
Pars Air		PR	PRS	PARS AIR	2015 (Commenced in 2021)	Shiraz, Tehran–Mehrabad	
Pouya Air		PY	PYA	POUYA	2008	Tehran–Mehrabad	
Qeshm Air		QB	IRQ	QESHM AIR	1996	Qeshm, Tehran–Imam Khomeini, Tehran–Mehrabad	
Raimon Airways		-	RAI	RAIMON	2025	Tehran–Mehrabad	
Roham Airways					2023?	Mashhad Shahid Hasheminejad International Airport	
Saha Airlines			IRZ	SAHA	1990	Tehran–Mehrabad	
Sahand Airlines		DH	IRS	SAHAND AIR	2009	Tehran–Mehrabad	
Sepehran Airlines		IS	SHI	SHIRAZI	2017	Mashhad, Tehran–Imam Khomeini, Tehran–Mehrabad	
Soroush Air					2025		
Taban Air		HH	TBM	TABAN AIR	2005	Mashhad, Tehran–Imam Khomeini, Tehran–Mehrabad	
Taftan Airlines			SBT	TAFTAN	2004	Zahedan Airport	
Tara Helicopter Company					1995		Founded as airline with YAK 42 aircraft, rebranded to Tara Helicopter company in 1995
Toos Airlines			IRT	TOOS AIR	2024	Mashhad Shahid Hasheminejad International Airport	
Varesh Airlines		VR	VRH	SKY VICTOR	2017	Mashhad, Sari, Tehran–Imam Khomeini, Tehran–Mehrabad	
Yazd Airways			DZD	YAZD AIRWAYS	2022	Tehran–Imam Khomeini, Tehran-Mehrabad Yazd Shahid Sadooghi Airport	
Zagros Airlines		ZV	IZG	ZAGROS	2005	Mashhad, Tehran–Imam Khomeini, Tehran–Mehrabad	
Zahedan Air					2026		

== Cargo airlines ==
Airline	Image	IATA	ICAO	Callsign	Founded	Hub	Notes
Atlas Air Cargo					2024		
Iran Air Cargo		IR	IRA	IRAN AIR	1961?		
Iran Aseman Airlines Cargo							former 727 operator, now uses only belly space
Payam Air		2F	IRP	PAYAMAIR	1996	Karaj-Payam	Dormant
Pouya Cargo Air		PY	PYA	POUYA	2008	Tehran-Mehrabad	

== See also ==
- List of airlines
- List of defunct airlines of Iran
- List of defunct airlines of Asia
- Tourism in Iran
- List of airports in Iran
- Iran Aviation Industries Organization
- International Rankings of Iran in Transportation
- Iran airshow
- Iran Civil Aviation Organization
- List of Iranian Aviation Accidents and Incidents
- Transport in Iran
