= Taban Air =

Airline in Iran

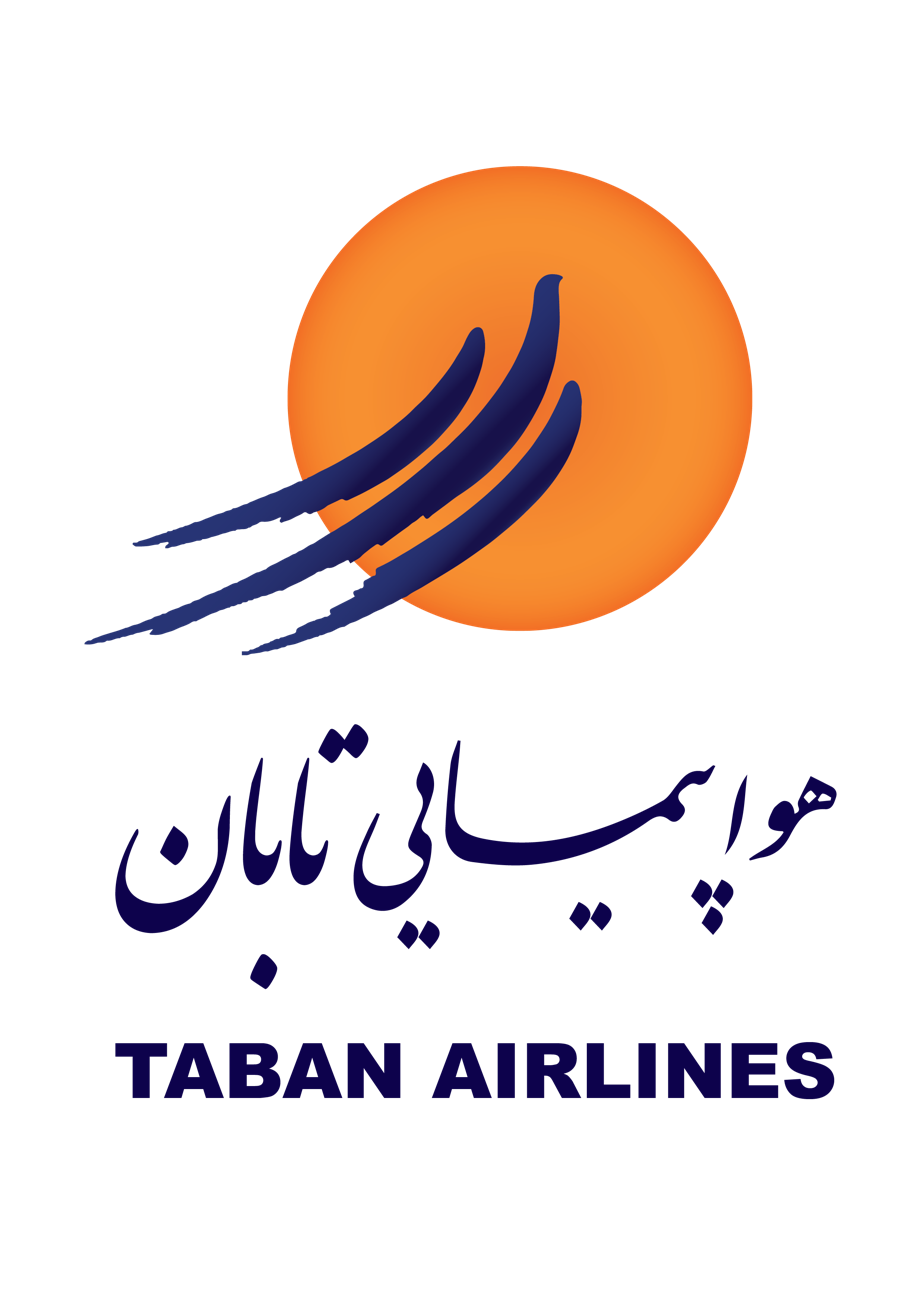

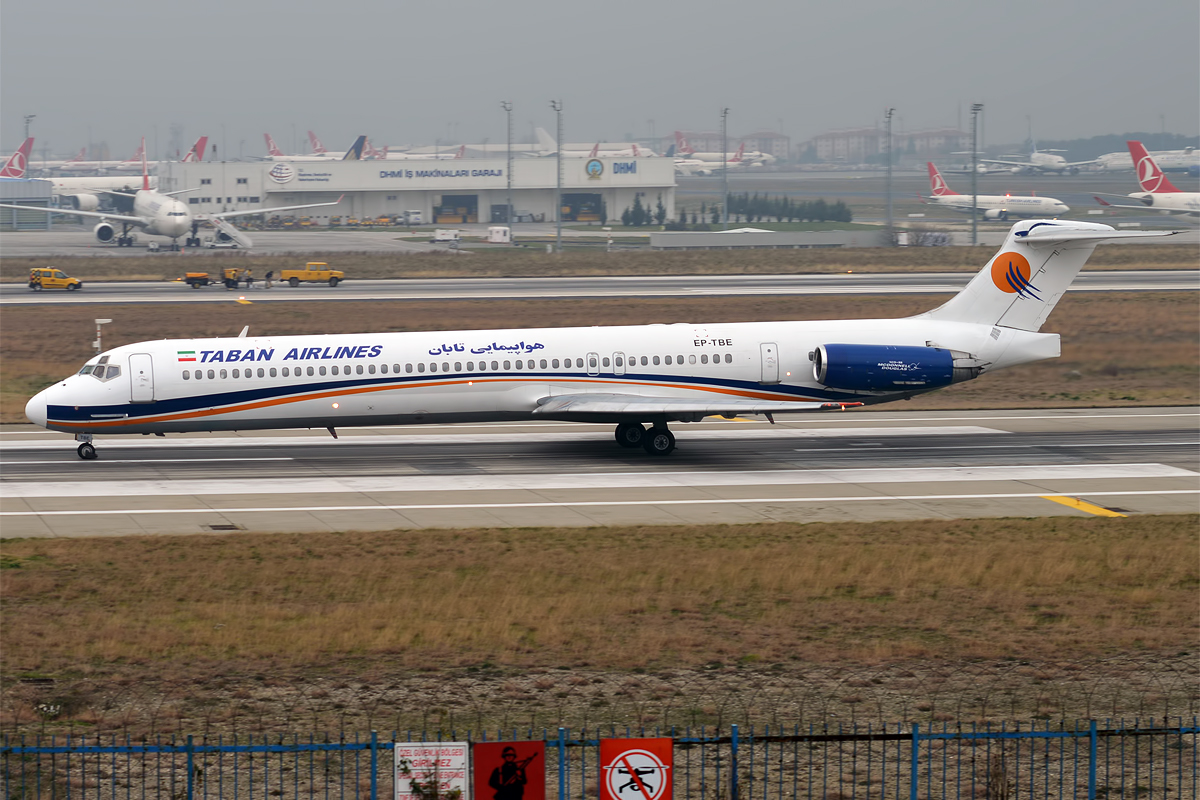
- Taban Air MD-88
IATA	ICAO	Call sign
HH	TBM	TABAN AIR
- Founded: 2005; 21 years ago
- Commenced operations: 2006; 20 years ago
- Hubs: Mashhad Shahid Hasheminejad International Airport; Tehran Imam Khomeini International Airport; Tehran Mehrabad Airport
- Focus cities: Shiraz Shahid Dastgheib International Airport
- Fleet size: 5
- Destinations: 33
- Headquarters: Mashhad, Iran
- Key people: Cpt. Asghar Abdollahpour (Chairman, CEO)
- Website: https://taban.aero/?lang=en

Taban Air (Persian: هواپیمایی تابان, Havâpeymâyi-ye Tâbân), officially known as Taban Airlines, is an airline headquartered in the Ekbatan Complex in Tehran, Iran, with its main operational base in Mashhad. It operates international, domestic, and charter routes as a scheduled carrier.

== History ==
The airline operates domestic and international flights and was founded in 2005, beginning operations in 2006. Taban Air initially started as a charter airline but later expanded to offer scheduled flights, and was founded by Captain Asghar Abdollahpour.

In 2016 the airline added it's singular Boeing 757 which was removed in 2017.In 2023 the airline began flights to Karachi. In 2025 it was reported that Taban Air leased an MD 82 to Iranian airline LAD Airways.

== Fleet ==
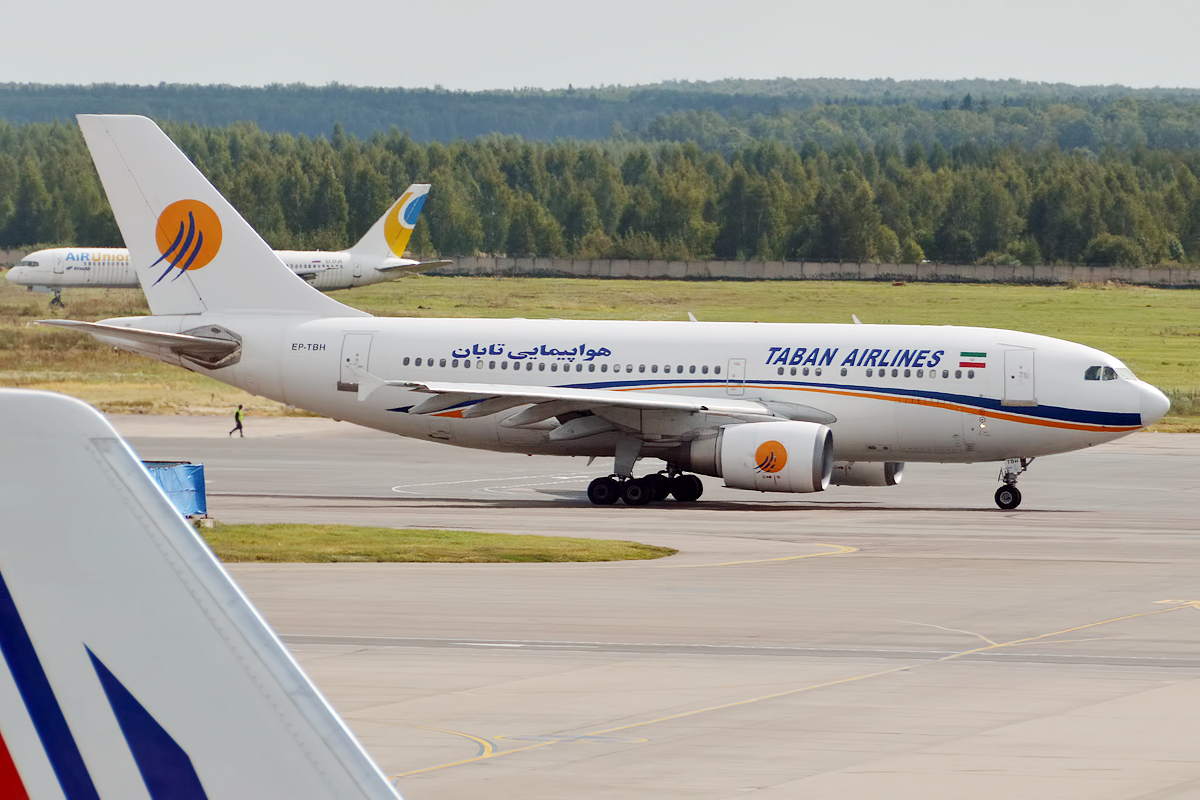
Taban Air Airbus A310-300

=== Current fleet ===
As of July 2026, Taban Air operates the following aircraft:

Taban Air Fleet
Aircraft	In Service	Orders	Passengers			Notes
Aircraft	In Service	Orders	C	Y	Total	Notes
Boeing 737-400	1	—	—	168	168	
McDonnell Douglas MD-82	1	—	—			
McDonnell Douglas MD-88	3	—	—	165	165	
Total	5	—				

=== Former fleet ===
As of August 2025, Taban Air operated 1 Airbus A320, 1 Boeing 737-400 and 4 McDonnell Douglas MD-88.

Taban Air Fleet
Aircraft	In Service	Orders	Passengers			Notes
Aircraft	In Service	Orders	C	Y	Total	Notes
Tupolev Tu-154	11	—	—	––	154	
Boeing 757-200	1	—	—	—	245	
BAE 146	1	—	—	—	165	
Airbus A310-300	1	—	—	—	300	
Total	14	—				

== Destinations ==
Taban Air has 15 domestic destinations and 18 international destinations

Destinations of Taban Air
Country	City	Airport	Notes
Iran	Tehran	Mehrabad International Airport	Hub
Iran	Tehran	Imam Khomeini International Airport	Hub
Iran	Mashhad	Mashhad Shahid Hasheminejad International Airport	Hub
Iran	Shiraz	Shiraz Shahid Dastgheib International Airport	
Iran	Isfahan	Isfahan Shahid Beheshti International Airport	
Iran	Karaj	Payam International Airport	
Iran	Ahvaz	Qasem Soleimani International Airport	
Iran	Kish Island	Kish International Airport	
Iran	Qeshm Island	Qeshm International Airport	
Iran	Rasht	Rasht Airport	
Iran	Kerman	Ayatollah Hashemi Rafsanjani Airport	
Iran	Tabriz	Tabriz Shahid Madani International Airport	
Iran	Bandar Abbas	Bandar Abbas International Airport	
Iran	Zahedan	Zahedan Airport	
Iran	Urmia	Urmia Shahid Bakeri International Airport	
Iraq	Baghdad	Baghdad International Airport	
Iraq	Najaf	Al Najaf International Airport	
Oman	Muscat	Muscat International Airport	
Oman	Sohar	Sohar Airport	
Georgia	Tbilisi	Tbilisi International Airport	
Georgia	Batumi	Batumi International Airport	
United Arab Emirates	Dubai	Dubai International Airport	
Afghanistan	Kabul	Kabul International Airport	
Syria	Damascus	Damascus International Airport	
Turkey	Istanbul	Istanbul Airport	
Ukraine	Kyiv	Kyiv International Airport	Suspended
Russia	Moscow	Sheremetyevo International Airport	
Russia	Saint Petersburg	Pulkovo Airport	
China	Guangzhou	Guangzhou Baiyun International Airport	
Uzbekistan	Tashkent	Tashkent International Airport	
Uzbekistan	Samarkand	Samarkand International Airport	
Uzbekistan	Bukhara	Bukhara International Airport	
Uzbekistan	Fergana	Fergana International Airport	
Vietnam	Nha Trang	Cam Ranh International Airport	
Thailand	Phuket	Phuket International Airport	
Saudi Arabia	Jeddah	King Abdulaziz International Airport	
Saudi Arabia	Medina	Prince Mohammad bin Abdulaziz International Airport	
Spain	Madrid	Madrid–Barajas Airport	

== Incidents and accidents ==
- On 24 January 2010, Taban Air Flight 6437, a Tupolev Tu-154, crashed whilst making an emergency landing at Mashhad International Airport due to a medical emergency; all 157 passengers and 13 crew survived the accident with 42 receiving minor injuries.
