= Central Organization for Statistics =

Iraq's principal government institution in charge of statistics and census data

- Commission Statistics and GIS
- هيأة الاحصاء ونظم المعلومات الجغرافية
- Abbreviation: COSIT
- Purpose: Statistics
- Headquarters: Baghdad
- Parent organization: Ministry of Planning

The Commission Statistics and GIS (COSIT) or the Commission Statistics and GIS (COS, Arabic: هيأة الاحصاء ونظم المعلومات الجغرافية) is the Government of Iraq's statistics agency. It has its headquarters in Hay Al-Elwiya, Baghdad.
