= Iran Airtour =

Airline in Iran

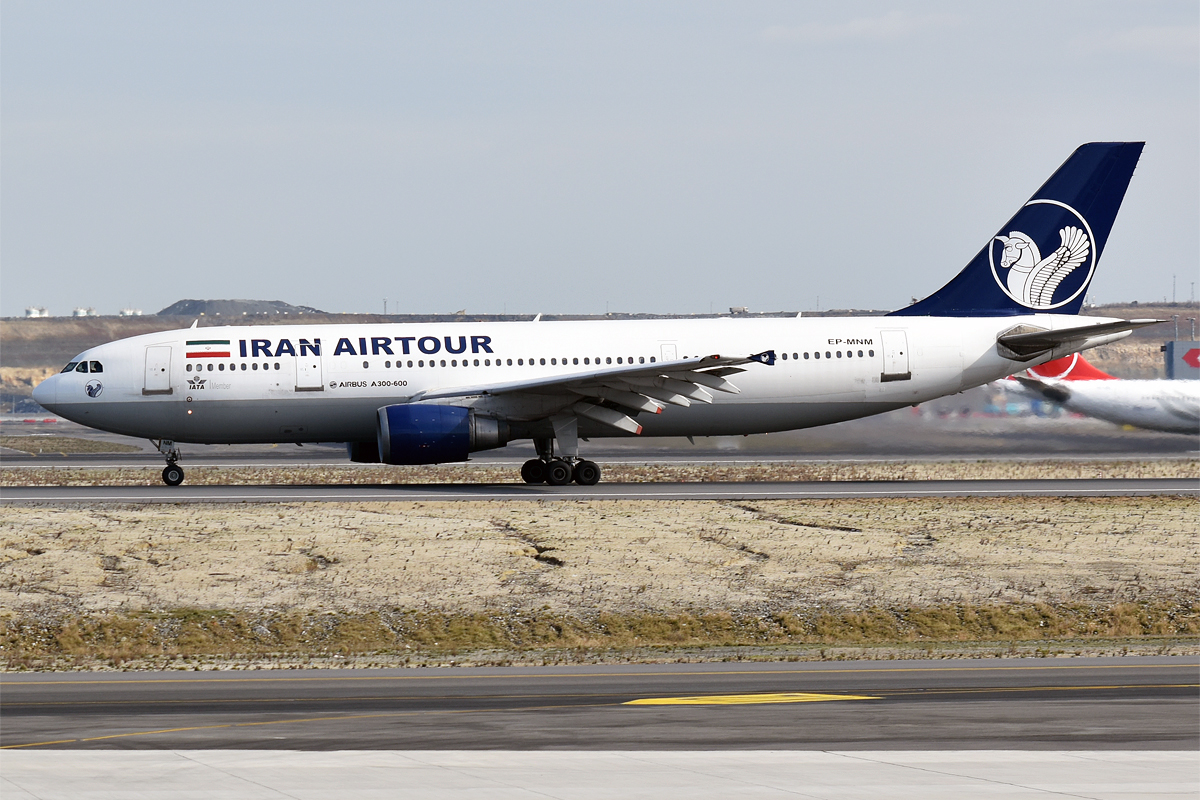
- Iran Airtour Airbus A300-600
IATA	ICAO	Call sign
B9	IRB	AIRTOUR
- Founded: 1973; 53 years ago
- Hubs: Mashhad Shahid Hasheminejad International Airport; Shiraz Shahid Dastgheib International Airport; Tabriz Shahid Madani International Airport; Tehran Imam Khomeini International Airport; Tehran Mehrabad Airport
- Fleet size: 18
- Destinations: 23
- Headquarters: Tehran, Iran
- Key people: Majid Shekari (owner)
- Employees: 1300
- Website: www.iranairtour.ir

Iran Airtour (Persian: ایران ایرتور, romanized: Irân Eyrtur) is a privately owned Iranian airline that was launched in 1973. Its main base is Mashhad Airport.

== History ==
=== Foundation and early years ===
Iran Airtour is one of Iran's private airlines, established in 1973 by Iran Air with the aim of launching tours to the cities of Iran and different countries. In 1982, Iran Airtour started scheduled domestic tours from all over Iran to Mashhad. Two years later, the airline started to develop foreign tours to China, UAE, India, Singapore and Malaysia.

Iran Airtours flight activity as an independent airline started in 1992 in Mashhad, which became the operations center of the airline. A direct air link from Mashhad to the centers of 13 provinces ensued. Iran Airtour was also responsible for operating flights from different cities to Mecca for pilgrimage, as well as regional flights with 19 aircraft to Damascus, Stockholm, Moscow, and Ashgabat.

=== Development since 2010 ===
Until 2010, Iran Airtour was one of the state-owned airline companies in Iran, but subsequently, in accordance with Article 44 of the Constitutional law, ownership was assigned to Hesayar Co., a subsidiary of the Iranian Ministry of Defence. Because four of five consecutive payment checks from Hesayar Co. bounced for insufficient funds, the original assignment was canceled. After another auction in 2016, the airline was conceded to the private sector.

In October 2021, Iran Airtour got permission to fly in the European airspace, making it the second Iranian airline to be able to do so. Iran Airtour is also one of the companies that has a license for aviation training in Iran (ATO) from the National Aviation Organization. Iran Airtour is a member of the International Air Transport Association (IATA) and holds the IATA Operational Safety Audit (IOSA), audited by IATA-approved auditors. Iran Airtour Airlines consists of more than 1300 specialized and skilled personnel in different parts.

On 17 January 2025, it was reported that Iran Airtour will launch non-stop flights between Tehran and Paris commencing 31 January 2025. The route will be serviced two times weekly with its Airbus A300-600 aircraft. In addition, new routes to Germany, Spain and Italy are in the pipeline and will be launched in March 2025.

== Destinations ==
Iran Airtour's primary base is Mashhad Airport. As of April 2023, Iran Airtour operates scheduled services to the following destinations.

Country	City	Airport	Notes	Refs
Armenia	Yerevan	Zvartnots International Airport		
Georgia	Batumi	Batumi International Airport		
Georgia	Tbilisi	Tbilisi International Airport		
Kazakhstan	Aqtau	Aqtau International Airport	Seasonal	
Tunisia	Munastir	Monastir Habib Bourguiba International Airport		
Iran	Abadan	Abadan Ayatollah Jami International Airport		
Iran	Ahvaz	Qasem Soleimani International Airport		
Iran	Asaluyeh	Persian Gulf Airport		
Iran	Bandar Abbas	Bandar Abbas International Airport		
Iran	Birjand	Birjand International Airport		
Iran	Bushehr	Bushehr Airport		
Iran	Isfahan	Isfahan Shahid Beheshti International Airport		
Iran	Kish	Kish International Airport		
Iran	Mashhad	Mashhad Shahid Hasheminejad International Airport	Hub	
Iran	Rasht	Rasht Airport		
Iran	Shiraz	Shiraz Shahid Dastgheib International Airport		
Iran	Tabriz	Tabriz Shahid Madani International Airport		
Iran	Tehran	Imam Khomeini International Airport	Hub	
Iran	Tehran	Mehrabad International Airport	Hub	
Iran	Zahedan	Zahedan Airport		
Iraq	Baghdad	Baghdad International Airport		
Iraq	Najaf	Al Najaf International Airport		
Malaysia	Kuala Lumpur	Kuala Lumpur International Airport		
Russia	Sochi	Adler-Sochi International Airport	Seasonal	
Turkey	Denizli	Denizli Çardak Airport	Seasonal	
Turkey	Istanbul	Istanbul Airport		
Turkey	İzmir	İzmir Adnan Menderes Airport		
United Arab Emirates	Dubai	Dubai International Airport		

== Fleet ==
Airbus A310-300.

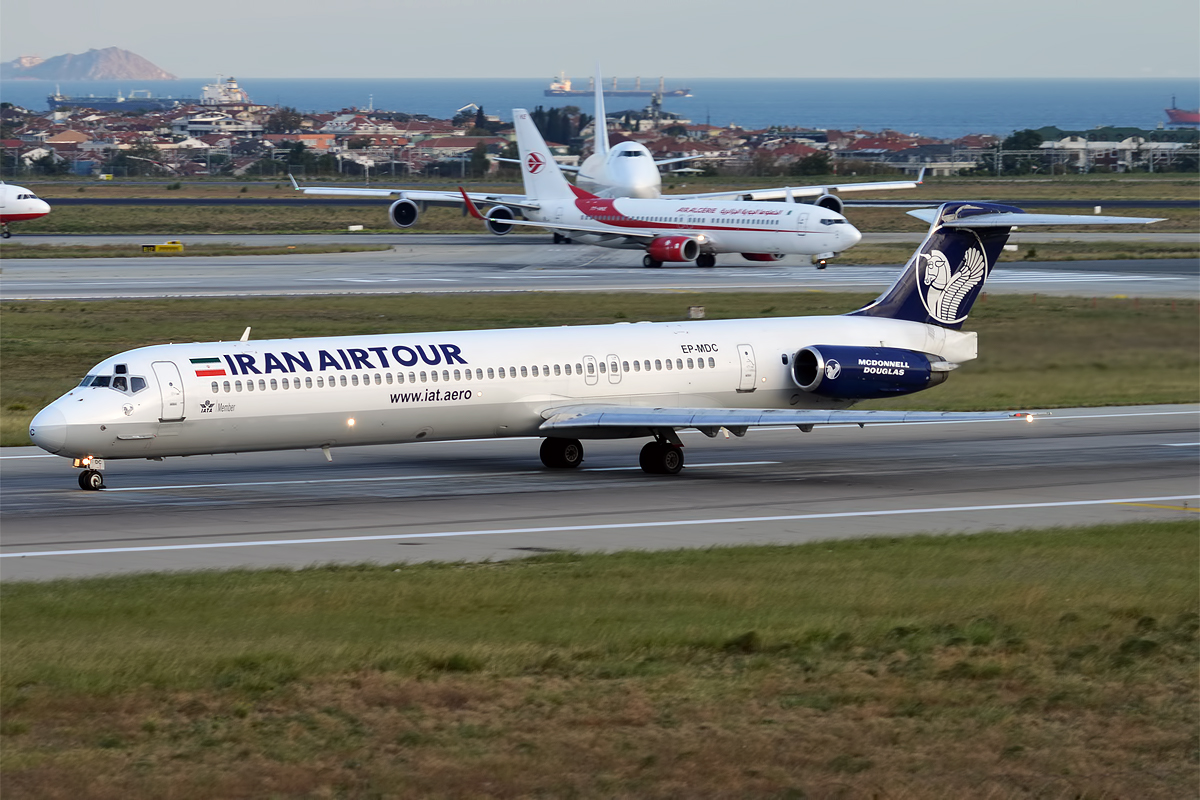
McDonnell Douglas MD-82.

=== Current fleet ===
As of July 2026, Iran Airtour operates the following aircraft:

Iran Airtour fleet
Aircraft	In service	Orders	Passengers			Notes
Aircraft	In service	Orders	B	E	Total	Notes
Airbus A300-600	5	—	22	258	280	
Airbus A310-300	4	—	18	232	250	
Airbus A320-200	3		—	180	180	
McDonnell Douglas MD-82	4	—	—	160	160	
McDonnell Douglas MD-83	1	—	—	160	160	
McDonnell Douglas MD-87	1	—	—	130	130	
Total	18	0				

=== Former fleet ===
As of August 2025, Iran Airtour operated 2 Airbus A300, 3 Airbus A310, 1 Airbus A320, 4 McDonnell Douglas MD-81, 1 McDonnell Douglas MD-83 and 1 McDonnell Douglas MD-87.

== Accidents and incidents ==
Since 1993, Iran AirTour has had three fatal aircraft accidents.

- On 8 February 1993, a Tupolev Tu-154, Iran Airtour Flight 962, shortly after departure from Tehran International Airport, crashed into a Sukhoi Su-24 of the Iranian Air Force which was landing. In this accident, all 133 people – both pilots of the Su-24 and Tu-154, all 12 crew members, and 119 passengers on board – died. The main cause of this accident was the Sukhoi Su-24 pilot's error.
- On 12 February 2002, a Tupolev Tu-154, Iran Airtour Flight 956, flying from Tehran to Khorramabad, crashed into the Sefid Kooh mountains during heavy rain, snow and dense fog. All 12 crew members and 107 passengers died.
- On 1 September 2006, a Tupolev Tu-154, Iran Airtour Flight 945, flying from Bandar Abbas to Mashhad, with 11 crew and 137 passengers on board, burst into flames upon landing at Mashhad International Airport, 28 out of the 148 passengers and crew died.

== See also ==
- List of airlines of Iran
