= FlyPersia =

Iranian airline

flyPersia هواپیمایی فلای پرشیا Havâpeymâyi-ye Flây Peršyâ
IATA	ICAO	Call sign
FP	FPI	FLYPERSIA
- Founded: 2018; 8 years ago
- Commenced operations: 2018; 8 years ago
- Operating bases: Shiraz Shahid Dastgheib International Airport; Tehran Mehrabad International Airport
- Fleet size: 2
- Destinations: 13
- Headquarters: Tehran, Iran
- Website: flypersiaairlines.ir

FlyPersia (Persian: هواپیمایی فلای پرشیا, Havâpeymâyi-ye Flây Peršyâ) is an Iranian airline based in Shiraz that operates scheduled domestic flights in Iran as well as international flights to Iraq.

== History ==
Fly Persia, after registering with the Companies Registration Office in 2018, started its activity to receive the flight operations certificate from the National Aviation Organization, and after receiving this certificate in 2019 by making the first passenger flight from the origin of Shiraz to the holy city of Mashhad began its activities. The company was approved by the Supreme Aviation Council in 2017, and this airline was registered in the center of Shiraz. The Shiraz-based company operates at Shahid Dastgheib International Airport in Shiraz. Fly Persia began its operations with three aircraft.

== Destinations ==
FlyPersia serves these destinations (as of May 2023):

Country	City	Airport	Notes	Refs
Iran	Abadan	Ayatollah Jami International Airport		
Iran	Ahvaz	Qasem Soleimani International Airport		
Iran	Asaluyeh	Persian Gulf Airport		
Iran	Chabahar	Chabahar Konarak Airport		
Iran	Isfahan	Shahid Beheshti International Airport		
Iran	Kish	Kish International Airport		
Iran	Mashhad	Shahid Hasheminejad International Airport		
Iran	Qeshm	Qeshm International Airport		
Iran	Shiraz	Shahid Dastgheib International Airport	Hub	
Iran	Tehran	Imam Khomeini International Airport		
Iran	Tehran	Mehrabad International Airport	Hub	
Iran	Yazd	Shahid Sadooghi Airport		
Iraq	Najaf	Al Najaf International Airport		

== Fleet ==
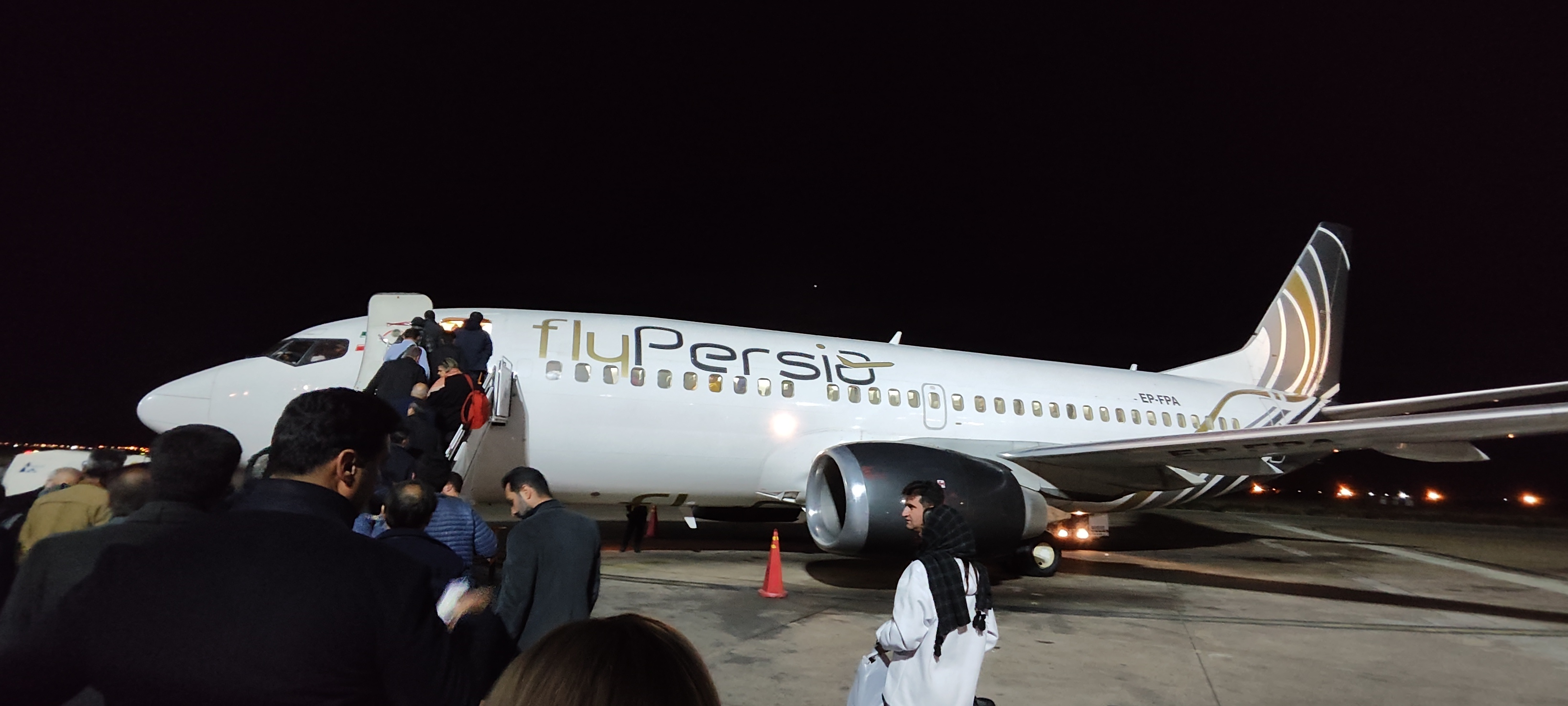
FlyPersia Boeing 737

=== Current fleet ===
As of July 2026, FlyPersia operates the following aircraft:

FlyPersia Fleet
Aircraft	In service	Notes
Boeing 737-300	2	
Total	2	

=== Former fleet ===
As of August 2025, FlyPersia operated 2 Boeing 737-300.
