= List of the busiest airports in Iran =

This is the list of the busiest airports in Iran.

== 2019 Statistics ==
| Rank | Airport | City | Passengers Domestic | Passengers International | Passengers Total | Change |
|---|---|---|---|---|---|---|
| 1 | Mehrabad International Airport | Tehran | 14,931,796 | 2 | 14,931,798 | ▼2% |
| 2 | Mashhad International Airport | Mashhad | 7,361,524 | 1,499,795 | 8,861,319 | ▼2% |
| 3 | Imam Khomeini International Airport | Tehran | 18,718 | 7,036,441 | 7,055,159 | ▼7% |
| 4 | Kish International Airport | Kish | 3,158,141 | 48,355 | 3,206,496 | ▲9% |
| 5 | Shiraz International Airport | Shiraz | 2,547,721 | 463,490 | 3,011,211 | ▼6% |
| 6 | Ahwaz International Airport | Ahwaz | 2,337,242 | 37,175 | 2,374,417 | ▼4% |
| 7 | Isfahan International Airport | Isfahan | 1,652,167 | 229,220 | 1,881,387 | ▼14% |
| 8 | Tabriz International Airport | Tabriz | 1,411,870 | 222,713 | 1,634,583 | ▲3% |
| 9 | Bandar Abbas International Airport | Bandar Abbas | 1,171,689 | 46,132 | 1,217,821 | ▼2% |
| 10 | Abadan International Airport | Abadan | 898,889 | 0 | 898,889 | ▲28% |
| 11 | Kerman Airport | Kerman | 742,052 | 26,044 | 768,096 | ▼2% |
| 12 | Persian Gulf Airport | Asaluyeh | 742,020 | 0 | 742,020 | ▼8% |
| 13 | Kermanshah Airport | Kermanshah | 561,175 | 6,218 | 567,393 | ▼1% |
| 14 | Shahid Sadooghi Airport | Yazd | 522,508 | 10,192 | 532,700 | ▼8% |
| 15 | Zahedan International Airport | Zahedan | 482,161 | 3,305 | 485,466 | ▼3% |
| 16 | Bushehr Airport | Bushehr | 479,822 | 1,950 | 481,772 | ▼2% |
| 17 | Qeshm International Airport | Qeshm | 390,481 | 44,712 | 435,193 | 0% |
| 18 | Rasht Airport | Rasht | 401,446 | 1,444 | 402,890 | ▼7% |
| 19 | Urmia Airport | Urmia | 321,601 | 21,737 | 343,338 | ▼12% |
| 20 | Dasht-e Naz Airport | Sari | 311,832 | 13,931 | 325,763 | ▼4% |
| | Total (55 airports including 27 international airports) | | 41,999,087 | 9,847,650 | 51,846,737 | ▼3% |

== 2018 Statistics ==
=== Notes ===
1. The results had been converted from a report generated in Persian Solar Hijri calendar
2. The reports of the airports in Iranian islands had not been published since 2017; All the existing reports are estimates.

| Rank | Airport | City | Passengers Domestic | Passengers International | Passengers Total | Change |
|---|---|---|---|---|---|---|
| 1 | Mehrabad International Airport | Tehran | 14,826,107 | 0 | 14,826,107 | ▼15% |
| 2 | Mashhad International Airport | Mashhad | 7,253,837 | 1,571,809 | 8,825,646 | ▼16% |
| 3 | Imam Khomeini International Airport | Tehran | 19,512 | 7,251,826 | 7,271,338 | ▼19% |
| 4 | Shiraz International Airport | Shiraz | 2,662,263 | 444,050 | 3,106,313 | ▼14% |
| 5 | Ahwaz International Airport | Ahwaz | 2,327,002 | 61,330 | 2,338,332 | ▼18% |
| 6 | Kish International Airport | Kish | - | - | - | - |
| 7 | Isfahan International Airport | Isfahan | 1,745,253 | 267,453 | 2,012,706 | ▼28% |
| 8 | Tabriz International Airport | Tabriz | 1,315,485 | 233,140 | 1,548,625 | ▼20% |
| 9 | Bandar Abbas International Airport | Bandar Abbas | 1,157,934 | 45,397 | 1,203,331 | ▼10% |
| 10 | Persian Gulf Airport | Asaluyeh | - | 0 | - | - |
| 11 | Kerman Airport | Kerman | 740,858 | 30,864 | 771,722 | ▼11% |
| 12 | Shahid Sadooghi Airport | Yazd | 515,391 | 14,828 | 530,219 | ▼31% |
| 13 | Kermanshah Airport | Kermanshah | 535,611 | 4,091 | 539,702 | ▼19% |
| 14 | Abadan International Airport | Abadan | 715,963 | 7,314 | 723,277 | ▲11% |
| 15 | Bushehr Airport | Bushehr | 439,143 | 2,505 | 441,648 | ▼30% |
| 16 | Zahedan International Airport | Zahedan | 477,369 | 6,220 | 483,589 | ▼14% |
| 17 | Qeshm International Airport | Qeshm | - | - | - | - |
| 18 | Urmia Airport | Urmia | 334,545 | 34,591 | 369,136 | ▼20% |
| 19 | Rasht Airport | Rasht | 401,756 | 6,201 | 407,957 | ▼13% |
| 20 | Dasht-e Naz Airport | Sari | 300,151 | 20,510 | 320,661 | ▼22% |

== 2017 Statistics ==
| Rank | Airport | City | Passengers Domestic | Passengers International | Passengers Total | Change |
|---|---|---|---|---|---|---|
| 1 | Mehrabad International Airport | Tehran | 17,464,216 | 0 | 17,464,216 | ▲7% |
| 2 | Mashhad International Airport | Mashhad | 8,853,506 | 1,605,871 | 10,459,377 | ▲4% |
| 3 | Imam Khomeini International Airport | Tehran | 8,647 | 8,843,585 | 8,852,232 | ▲13% |
| 4 | Shiraz International Airport | Shiraz | 3,095,468 | 435,057 | 3,530,525 | ▲7% |
| 5 | Ahwaz International Airport | Ahwaz | 2,838,040 | 101,918 | 2,939,958 | ▲10% |
| 6 | Kish International Airport | Kish | 2,878,168 | 48,584 | 2,926,752 | ▲4% |
| 7 | Isfahan International Airport | Isfahan | 2,258,806 | 525,810 | 2,784,616 | ▲7% |
| 8 | Tabriz International Airport | Tabriz | 1,641,410 | 301,316 | 1,942,726 | ▲10% |
| 9 | Bandar Abbas International Airport | Bandar Abbas | 1,200,684 | 88,379 | 1,289,063 | ▲15% |
| 10 | Persian Gulf Airport | Asaluyeh | 852,990 | 0 | 852,990 | ▲6% |
| 11 | Kerman Airport | Kerman | 765,309 | 81,008 | 846,317 | ▲3% |
| 12 | Shahid Sadooghi Airport | Yazd | 730,757 | 33,317 | 764,074 | ▲14% |
| 13 | Kermanshah Airport | Kermanshah | 659,148 | 3,456 | 662,604 | ▲18% |
| 14 | Abadan International Airport | Abadan | 610,739 | 34,176 | 644,915 | ▲0% |
| 15 | Bushehr Airport | Bushehr | 599,891 | 26,085 | 625,976 | ▲40% |
| 16 | Zahedan International Airport | Zahedan | 532,717 | 21,966 | 554,683 | ▲14% |
| 17 | Qeshm International Airport | Qeshm | 474,432 | 44,665 | 519,097 | ▲19% |
| 18 | Urmia Airport | Urmia | 396,465 | 55,502 | 451,967 | ▲15% |
| 19 | Rasht Airport | Rasht | 432,931 | 13,645 | 446,576 | ▲16% |
| 20 | Dasht-e Naz Airport | Sari | 341,577 | 66,225 | 407,802 | ▲18% |

== 2016 Statistics ==
| Rank | Airport | City | Passengers Domestic | Passengers International | Passengers Total | Change |
|---|---|---|---|---|---|---|
| 1 | Mehrabad International Airport | Tehran | 16,327,359 | 0 | 16,327,359 | ▲21% |
| 2 | Mashhad International Airport | Mashhad | 8,394,648 | 1,635,582 | 10,030,230 | ▲17% |
| 3 | Imam Khomeini International Airport | Tehran | 6,966 | 7,814,403 | 7,821,369 | ▲8% |
| 4 | Shiraz International Airport | Shiraz | 2,891,208 | 416,903 | 3,308,111 | ▲21% |
| 5 | Kish International Airport | Kish | 2,744,733 | 80,816 | 2,825,549 | ▲3% |
| 6 | Ahwaz International Airport | Ahwaz | 2,592,624 | 78,998 | 2,671,622 | ▲15% |
| 7 | Isfahan International Airport | Isfahan | 2,067,871 | 525,543 | 2,593,414 | ▲24% |
| 8 | Tabriz International Airport | Tabriz | 1,521,063 | 247,335 | 1,768,398 | ▲20% |
| 9 | Bandar Abbas International Airport | Bandar Abbas | 1,046,624 | 77,017 | 1,123,641 | ▲20% |
| 10 | Kerman Airport | Kerman | 733,949 | 84,098 | 818,047 | ▲6% |
| 11 | Persian Gulf Airport | Asaluyeh | 808,230 | 0 | 808,230 | ▲3% |
| 12 | Shahid Sadooghi Airport | Yazd | 624,858 | 47,309 | 672,167 | ▲23% |
| 13 | Abadan International Airport | Abadan | 601,129 | 43,486 | 644,615 | ▲19% |
| 14 | Kermanshah Airport | Kermanshah | 548,107 | 12,219 | 560,326 | ▲33% |
| 15 | Zahedan International Airport | Zahedan | 465,314 | 20,420 | 485,734 | ▲17% |
| 16 | Bushehr Airport | Bushehr | 436,101 | 11,769 | 447,870 | ▲38% |
| 17 | Qeshm International Airport | Qeshm | 377,638 | 59,452 | 437,090 | ▲10% |
| 18 | Urmia Airport | Urmia | 355,330 | 38,471 | 393,801 | ▲15% |
| 19 | Rasht Airport | Rasht | 380,221 | 5,689 | 385,910 | ▲27% |
| 20 | Dasht-e Naz Airport | Sari | 274,933 | 69,882 | 344,815 | ▲12% |

== 2015 Statistics ==
| Rank | Airport | City | Passengers Domestic | Passengers International | Passengers Total | Change |
|---|---|---|---|---|---|---|
| 1 | Mehrabad International Airport | Tehran | 13,515,543 | 150 | 13,515,693 | ▼2% |
| 2 | Mashhad International Airport | Mashhad | 6,680,495 | 1,865,103 | 8,545,598 | ▲6% |
| 3 | Imam Khomeini International Airport | Tehran | 1,981 | 7,241,139 | 7,243,120 | ▲20% |
| 4 | Kish International Airport | Kish | 2,433,951 | 306,125 | 2,740,076 | ▲2% |
| 5 | Shiraz International Airport | Shiraz | 2,244,263 | 486,225 | 2,730,488 | ▲12% |
| 6 | Isfahan International Airport | Isfahan | 1,733,062 | 515,167 | 2,248,229 | ▲2% |
| 7 | Ahwaz International Airport | Ahvaz | 2,051,693 | 107,622 | 2,159,315 | ▼1% |
| 8 | Tabriz International Airport | Tabriz | 1,214,767 | 257,083 | 1,471,850 | ▲3% |
| 9 | Bandar Abbas International Airport | Bandar Abbas | 860,100 | 73,953 | 934,053 | ▼4% |
| 10 | Persian Gulf Airport | Asaluyeh | 784,002 | 1 | 784,003 | ▲8% |
| 11 | Kerman Airport | Kerman | 685,840 | 88,962 | 774,802 | ▼4% |
| 12 | Shahid Sadooghi Airport | Yazd | 492,714 | 53,357 | 546,071 | ▲1% |
| 13 | Abadan International Airport | Abadan | 506,583 | 33,874 | 540,457 | ▲28% |
| 14 | Kermanshah Airport | Kermanshah | 390,327 | 31,849 | 422,176 | ▼14% |
| 15 | Zahedan International Airport | Zahedan | 203,455 | 210,340 | 413,795 | ▼5% |
| 16 | Qeshm International Airport | Qeshm | 302,274 | 94,825 | 397,099 | ▲16% |
| 17 | Urmia Airport | Urmia | 314,581 | 28,961 | 343,542 | ▲3% |
| 18 | Bushehr Airport | Bushehr | 306,063 | 18,141 | 324,204 | ▼18% |
| 19 | Dasht-e Naz Airport | Sari | 219,679 | 87,829 | 307,508 | ▼23% |
| 20 | Rasht Airport | Rasht | 280,474 | 23,671 | 304,145 | ▼9% |

== 2014 Statistics ==
| Rank | Airport | City | Passengers Domestic | Passengers International | Passengers Total | Change |
|---|---|---|---|---|---|---|
| 1 | Mehrabad International Airport | Tehran | 13,207,909 | 583,124 | 13,791,033 | ▲9% |
| 2 | Mashhad International Airport | Mashhad | 6,280,009 | 1,788,858 | 8,068,767 | ▲16% |
| 3 | Imam Khomeini International Airport | Tehran | 1,327 | 6,047,735 | 6,049,062 | ▲27% |
| 4 | Kish International Airport | Kish | 2,447,359 | 250,995 | 2,698,354 | ▲2% |
| 5 | Shiraz International Airport | Shiraz | 1,989,184 | 455,720 | 2,444,884 | ▲9% |
| 6 | Isfahan International Airport | Isfahan | 1,697,583 | 516,956 | 2,214,539 | ▲12% |
| 7 | Ahwaz International Airport | Ahvaz | 2,054,422 | 120,336 | 2,172,888 | ▲12% |
| 8 | Tabriz International Airport | Tabriz | 1,149,208 | 274,663 | 1,423,871 | ▲21% |
| 9 | Bandar Abbas International Airport | Bandar Abbas | 888,246 | 80,195 | 968,441 | ▲3% |
| 10 | Kerman Airport | Kerman | 686,556 | 116,662 | 802,918 | ▲16% |
| 11 | Persian Gulf Airport | Asaluyeh | 723,185 | 62 | 723,247 | ▲1% |
| 12 | Shahid Sadooghi Airport | Yazd | 449,768 | 91,711 | 541,479 | ▲22% |
| 13 | Kermanshah Airport | Kermanshah | 443,767 | 47,971 | 491,738 | ▲15% |
| 14 | Zahedan International Airport | Zahedan | 405,477 | 30,211 | 435,688 | ▲10% |
| 15 | Abadan International Airport | Abadan | 417,417 | 3,864 | 421,281 | ▲29% |
| 16 | Dasht-e Naz Airport | Sari | 155,652 | 183,480 | 339,132 | ▲58% |
| 17 | Bushehr Airport | Bushehr | 362,801 | 30,186 | 392,987 | ▼6% |
| 18 | Qeshm International Airport | Qeshm | 313,318 | 28,734 | 342,052 | ▲39% |
| 19 | Rasht Airport | Rasht | 299,620 | 34,492 | 334,112 | ▲12% |
| 20 | Urmia Airport | Urmia | 293,756 | 39,215 | 332,971 | ▲2% |

== 2013 Statistics ==
| Rank | Airport | City | Passengers Domestic | Passengers International | Passengers Total | Change |
|---|---|---|---|---|---|---|
| 1 | Mehrabad International Airport | Tehran | 12,173,396 | 494,248 | 12,667,644 | ▼8% |
| 2 | Mashhad International Airport | Mashhad | 5,605,644 | 1,380,238 | 6,985,882 | ▲2% |
| 3 | Imam Khomeini International Airport | Tehran | 679 | 4,755,333 | 4,756,012 | ▲0.4% |
| 4 | Kish International Airport | Kish | 2,412,552 | 231,029 | 2,643,581 | ▲1% |
| 5 | Shiraz International Airport | Shiraz | 1,885,345 | 357,621 | 2,242,966 | ▼7% |
| 6 | Isfahan International Airport | Isfahan | 1,579,454 | 398,510 | 1,977,964 | ▼2% |
| 7 | Ahwaz International Airport | Ahvaz | 1,867,414 | 81,274 | 1,948,688 | ▼8% |
| 8 | Tabriz International Airport | Tabriz | 978,545 | 198,976 | 1,177,521 | ▼11% |
| 9 | Bandar Abbas International Airport | Bandar Abbas | 865,253 | 75,373 | 940,626 | ▼15% |
| 10 | Persian Gulf Airport | Asaluyeh | 704,250 | 8,857 | 713,107 | ▼1% |
| 11 | Kerman Airport | Kerman | 607,934 | 82,862 | 690,796 | ▼12% |
| 12 | Shahid Sadooghi Airport | Yazd | 377,703 | 64,479 | 442,182 | ▲3% |
| 13 | Kermanshah Airport | Kermanshah | 392,978 | 33,594 | 426,572 | ▼16% |
| 14 | Bushehr Airport | Bushehr | 394,012 | 23,777 | 417,789 | ▼3% |
| 15 | Zahedan International Airport | Zahedan | 375,950 | 21,098 | 397,048 | ▼20% |
| 16 | Abadan International Airport | Abadan | 326,712 | 0 | 326,712 | ▲35% |
| 17 | Urmia Airport | Urmia | 295,736 | 30,390 | 326,126 | ▲3% |
| 18 | Rasht Airport | Rasht | 279,860 | 18,084 | 297,944 | ▼10% |
| 19 | Dasht-e Naz Airport | Sari | 170,871 | 81,580 | 252,451 | ▼11% |
| 20 | Qeshm International Airport | Qeshm | 208,374 | 37,590 | 245,964 | ▲18% |

== 2012 Statistics ==
| Rank | Airport | City | Passengers Domestic | Passengers International | Passengers Total | Change |
|---|---|---|---|---|---|---|
| 1 | Mehrabad International Airport | Tehran | 13,204,276 | 619,648 | 13,823,924 | ▲5% |
| 2 | Mashhad International Airport | Mashhad | 5,670,780 | 1,162,757 | 6,833,537 | ▲13% |
| 3 | Imam Khomeini International Airport | Tehran | 46 | 4,735,043 | 4,735,089 | ▼6% |
| 4 | Kish International Airport | Kish | 2,440,603 | 183,390 | 2,623,993 | ▲14% |
| 5 | Shiraz International Airport | Shiraz | 2,028,646 | 372,629 | 2,401,275 | ▲0.2% |
| 6 | Ahwaz International Airport | Ahvaz | 2,014,769 | 103,456 | 2,118,225 | ▲10% |
| 7 | Isfahan International Airport | Isfahan | 1,625,608 | 389,974 | 2,015,582 | ▲5% |
| 8 | Tabriz International Airport | Tabriz | 1,071,974 | 249,372 | 1,321,319 | ▼3% |
| 9 | Bandar Abbas International Airport | Bandar Abbas | 1,001,172 | 104,663 | 1,105,835 | ▼1% |
| 10 | Kerman Airport | Kerman | 685,342 | 101,744 | 787,086 | ▲4% |
| 11 | Persian Gulf Airport | Asaluyeh | 716,734 | 144 | 716,878 | ▲16% |
| 12 | Kermanshah Airport | Kermanshah | 462,421 | 44,116 | 506,537 | ▼8% |
| 13 | Zahedan International Airport | Zahedan | 457,888 | 39,480 | 497,368 | ▼2% |
| 14 | Bushehr Airport | Bushehr | 404,923 | 26,316 | 431,239 | ▲12% |
| 15 | Shahid Sadooghi Airport | Yazd | 362,278 | 66,553 | 428,831 | ▼9% |
| 16 | Rasht Airport | Rasht | 281,897 | 47,618 | 329,515 | ▼14% |
| 17 | Urmia Airport | Urmia | 277,266 | 40,622 | 317,888 | ▼6% |
| 18 | Dasht-e Naz Airport | Sari | 148,408 | 136,396 | 284,804 | ▲12% |
| 19 | Ardabil Airport | Ardabil | 241,008 | 20,136 | 261,144 | ▲0.3% |
| 20 | Gorgan Airport | Gorgan | 205,858 | 54,951 | 260,809 | ▲0.5% |

== 2011 Statistics ==
| Rank | Airport | City | Passengers Domestic | Passengers International | Passengers Total | Change |
|---|---|---|---|---|---|---|
| 1 | Mehrabad International Airport | Tehran | 12,500,340 | 692,424 | 13,192,764 | |
| 2 | Mashhad International Airport | Mashhad | 4,993,205 | 1,046,582 | 6,039,787 | |
| 3 | Imam Khomeini International Airport | Tehran | 854 | 5,019,982 | 5,020,836 | |
| 4 | Shiraz International Airport | Shiraz | 1,972,260 | 423,536 | 2,395,796 | |
| 5 | Kish International Airport | Kish | 2,126,440 | 178,083 | 2,304,523 | |
| 6 | Isfahan International Airport | Isfahan | 1,501,432 | 421,237 | 1,922,669 | |
| 7 | Ahwaz International Airport | Ahvaz | 1,788,548 | 133,638 | 1,922,186 | |
| 8 | Tabriz International Airport | Tabriz | 1,064,171 | 302,776 | 1,366,947 | |
| 9 | Bandar Abbas International Airport | Bandar Abbas | 1,000,812 | 114,555 | 1,115,367 | |
| 10 | Kerman Airport | Kerman | 673,264 | 85,831 | 759,095 | |
| 11 | Persian Gulf Airport | Asaluyeh | 617,966 | 1,410 | 619,376 | |
| 12 | Kermanshah Airport | Kermanshah | 509,580 | 43,044 | 552,624 | |
| 13 | Zahedan International Airport | Zahedan | 466,760 | 42,934 | 509,694 | |
| 14 | Shahid Sadooghi Airport | Yazd | 383,258 | 85,977 | 469,235 | |
| 15 | Abadan International Airport | Abadan | 382,291 | 12,492 | 394,784 | |
| 16 | Rasht Airport | Rasht | 339,306 | 44,645 | 383,951 | |
| 17 | Urmia Airport | Urmia | 310,183 | 27,496 | 337,679 | |
| 18 | Ardabil Airport | Ardabil | 247,021 | 13,397 | 260,418 | |
| 19 | Gorgan Airport | Gorgan | 220,686 | 38,899 | 259,585 | |
| 20 | Dasht-e Naz Airport | Sari | 122,101 | 133,210 | 255,311 | |

== See also ==
- List of airports in Iran
- List of airlines of Iran
- Iran Civil Aviation Organization
- Transport in Iran
- Iran
- List of the busiest airports in the Middle East
