= Sepehran Airlines =

Iranian airline

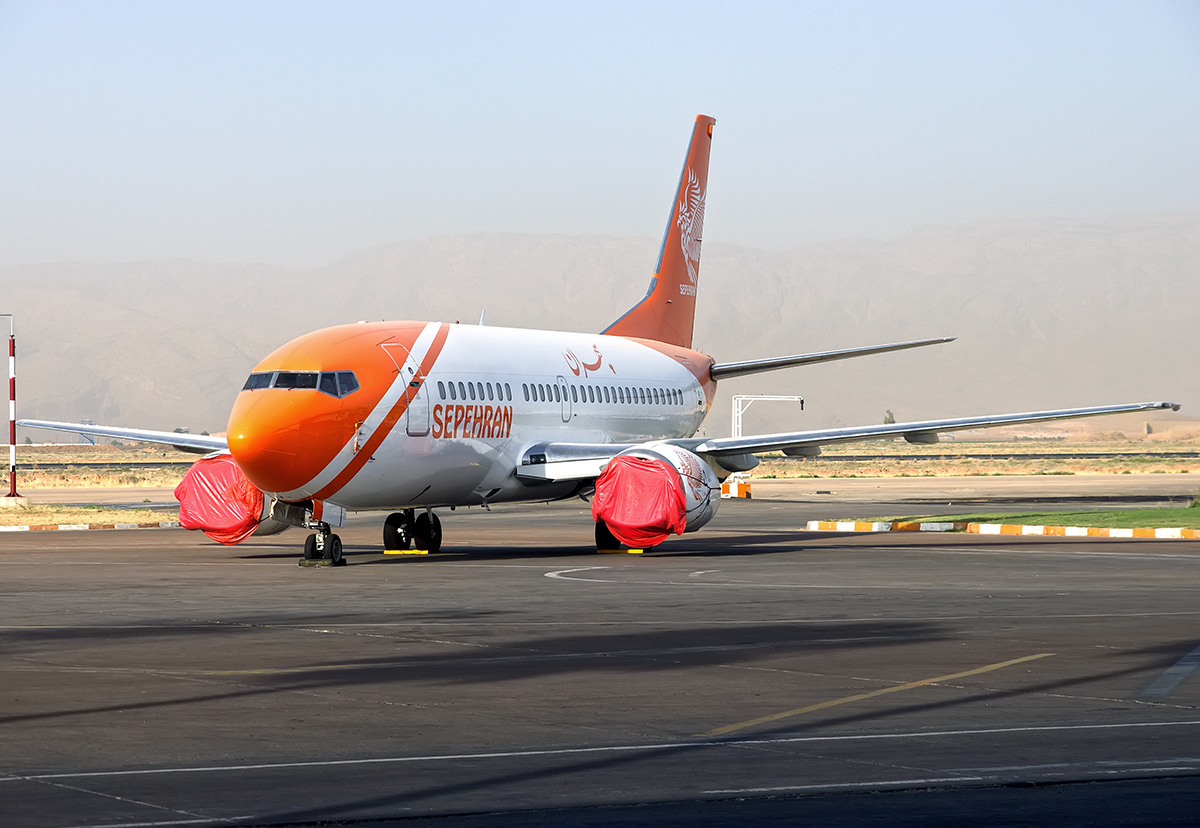
IATA	ICAO	Call sign
IS	SHI	SHIRAZI
- Founded: 10 July 2016; 10 years ago
- Commenced operations: 31 January 2018; 8 years ago
- Hubs: Mashhad Shahid Hasheminejad International Airport; Tehran Imam Khomeini International Airport; Tehran Mehrabad International Airport
- Frequent-flyer program: RedMiles Customers Club
- Fleet size: 13
- Destinations: 21
- Headquarters: Mashhad International Airport
- Key people: Hefzolah Ataherian, Arash Jahani
- Employees: More than 1000 people
- Website: www.flysepehran.com

Sepehran Airlines also known as flysepehran (Persian: هواپیمایی سپهران, Havâpeymâyi-ye Sepehrân) is an Iranian airline headquartered in Mashhad.

With the largest fleet of Boeing 737 aircraft in Iran, Sepehran Airlines' hubs are located at Mashhad International Airport (MHD), Imam Khomeini International Airport (IKA), and Tehran Mehrabad Airport (THR).

== History ==
- 2016: established to provide passenger, cargo, and freight services.
- 2018: Official launch of operations with two aircraft (EP-FSB and EP-FSI) - Launch of flysepehran Catering Department - Received the Approved Training Organization (ATO) certificate from the Civil Aviation Organization of Iran - Established flysepehran’s Engineering and Maintenance Department -Workforce reached 350 employees.
- 2019–2020: EP-FSA joined the fleet, bringing the total to three aircraft - Launch of the flysepehran Loyalty Club (RedMiles) - Workforce numbered 339 employees (pandemic period).
- 2021: Fleet expanded to four aircraft with the addition of EP-FSK - Workforce increased to 401 employees.
- 2022: Fleet expanded to six aircraft with the addition of EP-FSU and EP-FSV - Workforce increased to 535 employees.
- 2023: Fleet expanded to nine aircraft with the addition of EP-FSG, EP-FSL, and EP-FSF - Workforce increased to 820 employees.
- 2024: Fleet expanded to twelve aircraft with the addition of EP-FSE, EP-FST, and EP-FSQ - Workforce increased to 1,002 employees. (reference)
- 2026: The airline was the first airline to restart flights after the war with the route reopening on July 1 2026.

== Destinations ==
As of April 2023, Sepehran operates flights to the following destinations:

Country	City	Airport	Notes	Refs
Iran	Abadan	Ayatollah Jami International Airport		
Iran	Ahvaz	Qasem Soleimani International Airport		
Iran	Asaluyeh	Persian Gulf Airport		
Iran	Bandar Abbas	Bandar Abbas International Airport		
Iran	Bushehr	Bushehr Airport		
Iran	Chabahar	Chabahar Konarak Airport		
Iran	Kermanshah	Kermanshah Airport		
Iran	Kish	Kish International Airport		
Iran	Mashhad	Shahid Hasheminejad International Airport	Hub	
Iran	Qeshm	Qeshm International Airport		
Iran	Rasht	Rasht Airport		
Iran	Shiraz	Shahid Dastgheib International Airport		
Iran	Tabriz	Shahid Madani International Airport		
Iran	Tehran	Imam Khomeini International Airport	Hub	
Iran	Tehran	Mehrabad International Airport	Hub	
Iran	Yazd	Shahid Sadooghi Airport		
Iran	Zahedan	Zahedan Airport		
Iraq	Najaf	Al Najaf International Airport		
Kuwait	Kuwait City	Kuwait International Airport		
Turkey	Istanbul	Istanbul Airport		
Oman	Muscat	Muscat International Airport		
United Arab Emirates	Dubai	Dubai International Airport		

== Fleet ==
Sepehran Airlines Boeing 737-300

=== Current fleet ===
As of July 2026, Sepehran Airlines operates the following aircraft:

Sepehran Airlines Fleet
Aircraft	In service	Orders	Passengers	Notes
Boeing 737-300	6	—	132	
Boeing 737-500	6	—	132	
Dornier 328JET	1	—		
Total	13	—		

== Academy ==
In 2018, Sepehran Airlines was certified as an Approved Training Organization (ATO) by the Civil Aviation Organization of Iran (IRICAO). Since then, it has become one of Iran's leading aviation training centers.

== Accidents and incidents ==
- On 25 August 2026, Sepehran Airlines Flight 4310 from Tehran to Mashhad overran the runway upon landing and suffered a nose gear collapse. All 127 on board the Boeing 737-500 (registered EP-FSF) evacuated safely without injuries.
- On 14 September 2026, Sepehran Airlines Flight 4358 bound for Kermanshah suffered a mid-air emergency caused by a tire panel bursting shortly after takeoff from Mashhad, which caused violent shaking alongside a falling overhead panel. The Boeing 737-300 (registered EP-FSU) returned and landed safely with no preliminary injuries. Videos of passengers exclaiming Ya Ali surfaced, leading to criticism on social media regarding possible transgressions of tawhid, most notably by Haredi rabbi Yosef Mizrachi.
