= Chabahar Konarak Airport =

Chabahar Konarak International Airport فرودگاه کنارک
- IATA: ZBR; ICAO: OIZC

Summary
- Airport type: Public/Military
- Owner: Government of Iran
- Operator: Iran Airports Company; Iranian Air Force
- Serves: Chabahar and Konarak; Sistan and Baluchestan
- Location: Konarak, Iran
- Elevation AMSL: 13 m (43 ft)
- Coordinates: 25°26′36″N 060°22′55″E

Map
- Location of airport in Iran

Runways
Direction	Length		Surface
Direction	m	ft	Surface
09R/27L	3,000	9,844	Asphalt
09L/27R	3,814	12,514	Asphalt

Statistics (2017)
- Aircraft Movements: 1,971 ▲6%
- Passengers: 221,859 ▲20%
- Cargo: 2,422 tons ▲19%
- Source: Iran Airports Company

Chabahar/Konarak International Airport (IATA: ZBR, ICAO: OIZC) (Persian: فرودگاه بین المللی کنارک/چابهار) is an international airport located in 49 kilometers west of the city of Chabahar, Sistan and Baluchestan Province, Iran, in Konarak. The airport has flight connections to different parts of Iran and serves both cities. There are also flights offered to United Arab Emirates and to Oman.

== Airlines and destinations ==
Airlines	Destinations
Asa Jet	Isfahan, Tehran–Mehrabad
ATA Airlines	Tehran–Mehrabad
AVA Airlines	Tehran–Mehrabad
Caspian Airlines	Mashhad, Tehran–Mehrabad
Chabahar Airlines	Tehran–Mehrabad
FlyPersia	Shiraz
Iran Air	Bandar Abbas, Tehran–Mehrabad, Zahedan
Iran Airtour	Mashhad, Tehran–Mehrabad
Iran Aseman Airlines	Mashhad, Tehran–Mehrabad
Kish Air	Karachi, Muscat, Tehran–Mehrabad
Mahan Air	Mashhad, Tehran–Mehrabad, Zahedan
Meraj Airlines	Tehran–Mehrabad
Pars Air	Gorgan, Tehran–Mehrabad
Pouya Air	Bandar Abbas, Mashhad, Tehran–Mehrabad
Saha Airlines	Shiraz, Tehran–Mehrabad
Sepehran Airlines	Mashhad, Tehran–Mehrabad
Varesh Airlines	Sari, Sharjah, Tehran–Mehrabad
Zagros Airlines	Mashhad, Tehran–Mehrabad

== Accidents ==
- On July 2, 2024, a Boeing 737 of Varesh Airlines, registration EP-VAF, was undergoing maintenance: the right-hand engine was running with the cowlings open, when a maintenance engineer entered the safety zone to retrieve tools, was sucked into the engine and was killed.
