= Zahedan Airport =

Zahedan Airport زاہدان بالی پَٹ
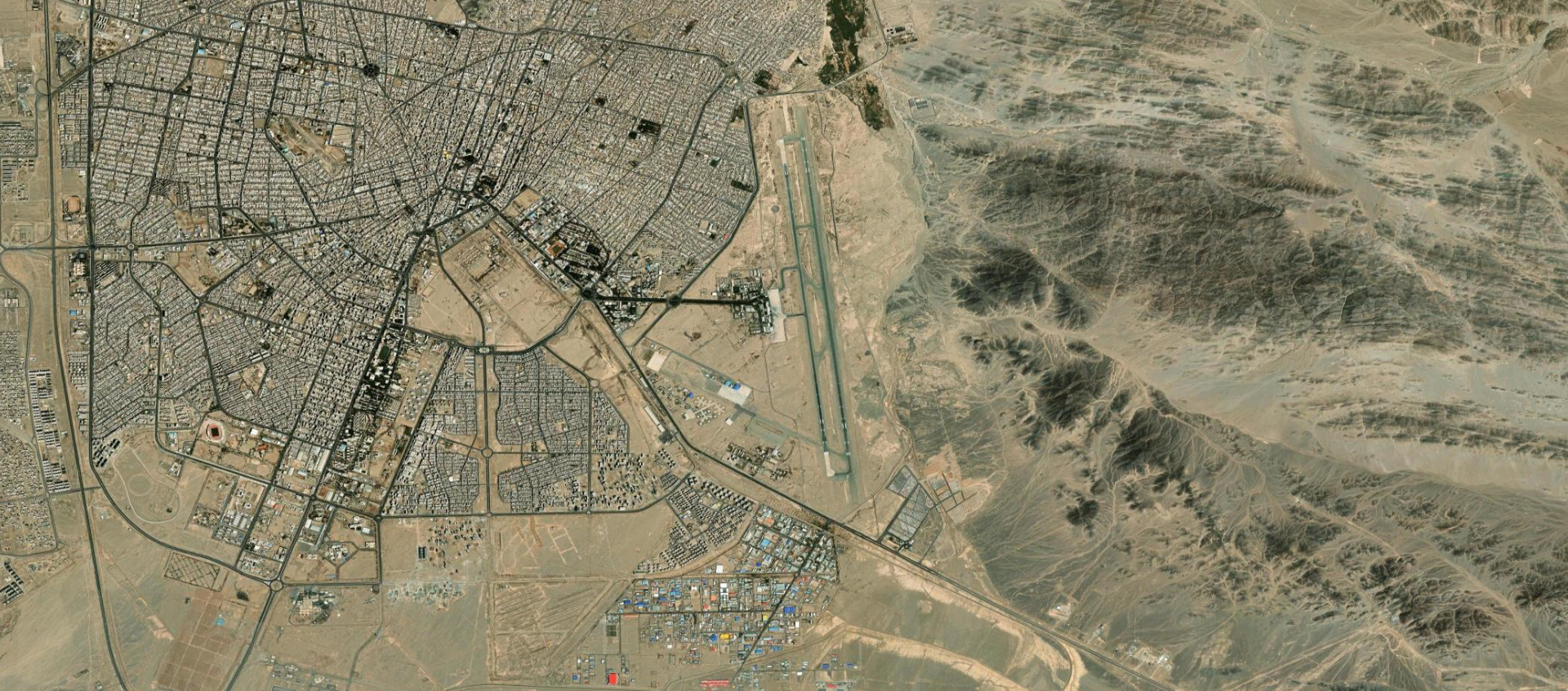
- IATA: ZAH; ICAO: OIZH

Summary
- Airport type: Public/military
- Owner: Government of Iran
- Operator: Iran Airports Company; Islamic Republic of Iran Army Aviation; Islamic Revolutionary Guard Corps; Iranian Police Aviation
- Serves: Zahedan, Sistan and Baluchestan
- Location: Zahedan, Iran
- Elevation AMSL: 1,391 m (4,564 ft)
- Coordinates: 29°28′32.47″N 060°54′22.28″E
- Website: zahedan.airport.ir

Map
- Location of airport in Iran

Runways
| Direction | Length | | Surface |
| Direction | m | ft | Surface |
|---|---|---|---|
| 17R/35L | 4,280 | 14,042 | Asphalt |
| 17L/35R | 4,280 | 14,042 | Asphalt |

Statistics (2017)
- Aircraft movements: 4,578 ▲10%
- Passengers: 554,683 ▲14%
- Cargo: 4,711 tons ▲17%
- Source: Iran Airports Company

Zahedan Airport (IATA: ZAH, ICAO: OIZH) (Persian: فرودگاه بین المللی زاهدان, Balochi: زاہدان بالی پَٹ) is an international airport located 6 kilometers northeast of the city of Zahedan, in Sistan and Baluchestan Province, southern Iran. The airport has flight connections to different parts of Iran and countries south of the Persian Gulf.

== Airlines and destinations ==
| Airlines | Destinations |
|---|---|
| Air1Air | Tehran–Mehrabad |
| ATA Airlines | Mashhad, Tehran–Mehrabad |
| AVA Airlines | Tehran–Mehrabad |
| Caspian Airlines | Gorgan, Mashhad, Tehran–Mehrabad |
| Chabahar Airlines | Tehran–Mehrabad |
| Iran Air | Chabahar/Konarak, Doha, Mashhad, Quetta, Tehran–Mehrabad; Seasonal: Jeddah, Medina |
| Iran Airtour | Mashhad, Tehran–Mehrabad |
| Iran Aseman Airlines | Isfahan, Mashhad, Shiraz, Tehran–Mehrabad |
| Kish Air | Kish, Tehran–Mehrabad |
| Mahan Air | Chabahar/Konarak, Isfahan, Tehran–Mehrabad |
| Pars Air | Tehran–Mehrabad |
| Qeshm Air | Gorgan, Mashhad, Tehran–Mehrabad |
| Saha Airlines | Tehran–Mehrabad |
| Sepehran Airlines | Mashhad, Tehran–Mehrabad |
| Taban Air | Mashhad |

== See also ==
- Transport in Iran
- List of airports in Iran
- List of the busiest airports in Iran
