= Ayatollah Hashemi Rafsanjani Airport =

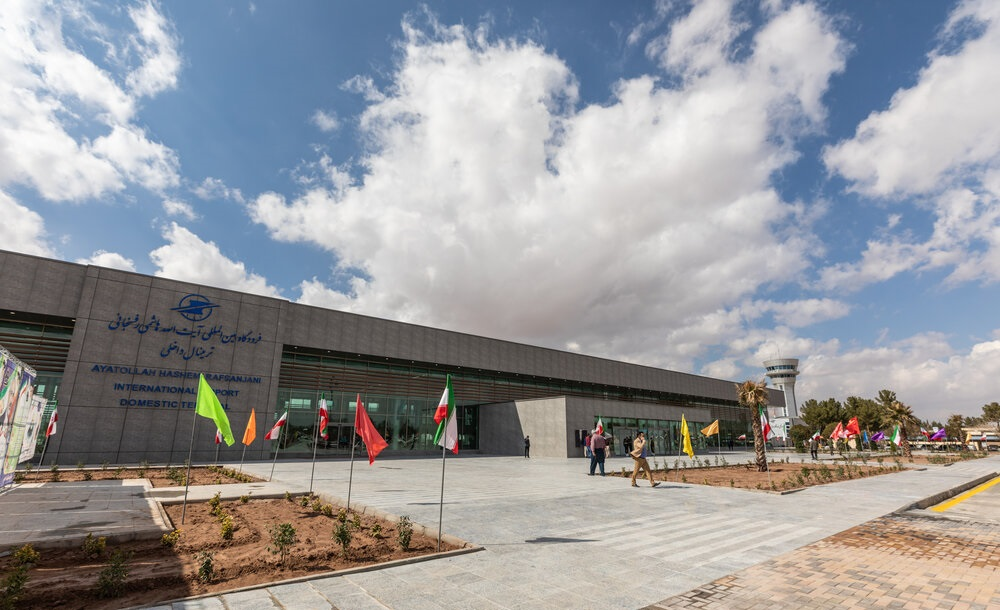
- IATA: KER; ICAO: OIKK

Summary
- Airport type: Public/Military
- Owner: Government of Iran
- Operator: Iran Airports Company; Islamic Republic of Iran Army Aviation; Islamic Revolutionary Guard Corps; Iranian Police Aviation
- Serves: Kerman
- Location: Kerman, Iran
- Focus city for: Mahan Air
- Elevation AMSL: 5,741 ft (1,750 m)
- Coordinates: 30°16′28″N 056°57′04″E
- Website: http://kerman.airport.ir

Map
- Location of airport in Iran

Runways
Direction	Length		Surface
Direction	ft	m	Surface
05/23	6,657	2,029	Asphalt
16/34	12,620	3,847	Asphalt

Statistics (2017)
- Aircraft Movements: 5,795 ▲19%
- Passengers: 846,317 ▲3%
- Cargo: 6,569 tons ▲1%
- Source: Iran Airports Company

Ayatollah Hashemi Rafsanjani Airport (Persian: فرودگاه بین‌المللی آیت‌الله هاشمی رفسنجانی) (IATA: KER, ICAO: OIKK) is an airport in Kerman, Iran. The airport is used for commercial, general aviation and military training purposes. Flights began operating in 1970.

Previously named the Kerman International Airport, the airport received its current name in 2017, after the death of the former Iranian president Akbar Hashemi Rafsanjani, earlier that year.

Mahan Air flight crew's simulator centre and cabin crew training centre is located at the airport. It is also the main hub for Bootia-Mahan Aviation College.

== Airlines and destinations ==
Airlines	Destinations
Asa Jet	Asaluyeh, Tehran–Mehrabad
ATA Airlines	Tehran–Mehrabad
Caspian Airlines	Mashhad, Tehran–Mehrabad
Chabahar Airlines	Tehran–Mehrabad
Flydubai	Dubai–International
Karun Airlines	Tehran–Mehrabad
Kish Air	Kish
Iran Air	Tehran–Mehrabad; Seasonal: Jeddah, Medina
Mahan Air	Ahvaz, Isfahan, Kish, Mashhad, Shiraz, Tabriz, Tehran–Mehrabad
Pars Air	Mashhad, Najaf (suspended), Tehran–Mehrabad
Pouya Air	Tehran–Mehrabad
Qeshm Air	Tehran–Mehrabad
Zagros Airlines	Tehran–Mehrabad

== See also ==
- List of airports in Iran
- List of the busiest airports in Iran
