= Ilam Airport =

- IATA: IIL; ICAO: OICI

Summary
- Airport type: Public
- Owner: Government of Iran
- Operator: Iran Airports Company
- Serves: cities of Ilam province
- Location: Ilam, Iran; Keshvari Rural District, Central County, Ilam Province
- Elevation AMSL: 4,404 ft (1,342 m)
- Coordinates: 33°35′11.78″N 046°24′17.43″E

Map
- Location of the airport in Iran

Runways
Direction	Length		Surface
Direction	ft	m	Surface
14/32	10,335	3,150	Asphalt
- Source: World Aero Data

Ilam Airport (Persian: فرودگاه ایلام) (IATA: IIL, ICAO: OICI) is a domestic airport located about 6 kilometres (3.7 mi) from the center of the city of Ilam, Iran. It serves the cities of Ilam province.

== Airlines and destinations ==
Airlines	Destinations
Iran Air	Tehran–Mehrabad
Iran Aseman Airlines	Mashhad, Tehran–Mehrabad
Mahan Air	Tehran–Mehrabad
Pouya Air	Tehran–Mehrabad
Qeshm Air	Tehran–Mehrabad
Zagros Airlines	Mashhad
