= List of Kuwait Airways destinations =

Kuwait Airways flies to 54 international destinations in 31 countries across Africa, Asia, Europe and North America from its hub at Kuwait International Airport as of June 2022.

== List of destinations ==
Country	City	Airport	Notes	Refs
Australia	Sydney	Sydney Airport	Terminated	
Austria	Vienna	Vienna International Airport	Seasonal	
Algeria	Algiers	Houari Boumediene Airport	Terminated	
Azerbaijan	Baku	Heydar Aliyev International Airport		
Bahrain	Manama	Bahrain International Airport		
Bangladesh	Chittagong	Shah Amanat International Airport	Terminated	
Bangladesh	Dhaka	Hazrat Shahjalal International Airport		
Bosnia and Herzegovina	Sarajevo	Sarajevo International Airport	Seasonal	
Bulgaria	Varna	Varna Airport	Terminated	
Belgium	Brussels	Brussels Airport	Terminated	
Belgium	Liège	Liège Airport	Terminated	
Canada	Ottawa	Ottawa Macdonald–Cartier International Airport	Terminated	
Canada	Toronto	Toronto Pearson International Airport	Terminated	
China	Guangzhou	Guangzhou Baiyun International Airport		
Cyprus	Larnaca	Larnaca International Airport	Terminated	
Czech Republic	Prague	Václav Havel Airport Prague	Terminated	
Denmark	Copenhagen	Copenhagen Airport	Terminated	
Ethiopia	Addis Ababa	Addis Ababa Bole International Airport		
Egypt	Alexandria	Borg El Arab International Airport	Seasonal	
Egypt	Cairo	Cairo International Airport		
Egypt	Luxor	Luxor International Airport		
Egypt	Sharm El Sheikh	Sharm El Sheikh International Airport	Seasonal	
Egypt	Sohag	Sohag International Airport		
Finland	Helsinki	Helsinki Airport	Terminated	
France	Lyon	Lyon–Saint-Exupéry Airport	Terminated	
France	Nice	Nice Côte d'Azur Airport	Seasonal	
France	Paris	Charles de Gaulle Airport		
Georgia	Tbilisi	Tbilisi International Airport		
Germany	Frankfurt	Frankfurt Airport		
Germany	Munich	Munich Airport		
Greece	Athens	Athens International Airport		
Greece	Mykonos	Mykonos Airport	Seasonal	
India	Ahmedabad	Ahmedabad Airport		
India	Bangalore	Kempegowda International Airport		
India	Chennai	Chennai International Airport		
India	Delhi	Indira Gandhi International Airport		
India	Hyderabad	Rajiv Gandhi International Airport		
India	Kochi	Cochin International Airport		
India	Mumbai	Chhatrapati Shivaji Maharaj International Airport		
India	Thiruvananthapuram	Thiruvananthapuram International Airport		
Indonesia	Jakarta	Soekarno–Hatta International Airport	Terminated	
Iran	Abadan	Abadan Ayatollah Jami International Airport	Terminated	
Iran	Isfahan	Isfahan Shahid Beheshti International Airport	Terminated	
Iran	Mashhad	Mashhad Shahid Hasheminejad International Airport		
Iran	Shiraz	Shiraz Shahid Dastgheib International Airport	Terminated	
Iran	Tehran	Imam Khomeini International Airport		
Iraq	Baghdad	Baghdad International Airport	Terminated	
Iraq	Najaf	Al Najaf International Airport		
Italy	Milan	Milan Malpensa Airport		
Italy	Rome	Rome Fiumicino Airport		
Japan	Osaka	Kansai International Airport	Terminated	
Japan	Tokyo	Haneda Airport	Terminated	
Japan	Tokyo	Narita International Airport	Terminated	
Jordan	Amman	Queen Alia International Airport		
Kenya	Nairobi	Jomo Kenyatta International Airport	Terminated	
Kuwait	Kuwait City	Kuwait International Airport	Hub	
Lebanon	Beirut	Beirut–Rafic Hariri International Airport		
Libya	Tripoli	Tripoli International Airport	Terminated	
Malaysia	Kuala Lumpur	Kuala Lumpur International Airport		
Maldives	Malé	Velana International Airport	Terminated	
Morocco	Casablanca	Mohammed V International Airport		
Netherlands	Amsterdam	Amsterdam Airport Schiphol		
Nepal	Kathmandu	Tribhuvan International Airport		
Norway	Oslo	Oslo Airport, Gardermoen	Terminated	
Oman	Muscat	Muscat International Airport	Seasonal	
Oman	Salalah	Salalah International Airport	Seasonal	
Pakistan	Islamabad	Benazir Bhutto International Airport	Airport closed	
Pakistan	Islamabad	Islamabad International Airport		
Pakistan	Karachi	Jinnah International Airport	Terminated	
Pakistan	Lahore	Allama Iqbal International Airport		
Palestine	East Jerusalem	Jerusalem Airport	Airport closed	
Philippines	Manila	Ninoy Aquino International Airport		
Qatar	Doha	Hamad International Airport		
Russia	Moscow	Moscow Domodedovo Airport		
Saudi Arabia	Dammam	King Fahd International Airport		
Saudi Arabia	Dhahran	Dhahran International Airport	Airport closed	
Saudi Arabia	Gassim	Prince Naif bin Abdulaziz International Airport	Terminated	
Saudi Arabia	Jeddah	King Abdulaziz International Airport		
Saudi Arabia	Medina	Prince Mohammad bin Abdulaziz International Airport		
Saudi Arabia	Riyadh	King Khalid International Airport		
Saudi Arabia	Ta'if	Taif International Airport	Terminated	
Singapore	Singapore	Changi Airport	Terminated	
South Africa	Cape Town	Cape Town International Airport	Terminated	
South Africa	Johannesburg	O. R. Tambo International Airport	Terminated	
South Korea	Seoul	Incheon International Airport	Terminated	
Somalia	Mogadishu	Aden Adde International Airport	Terminated	
Spain	Barcelona	Josep Tarradellas Barcelona–El Prat Airport		
Spain	Madrid	Madrid–Barajas Airport		
Spain	Málaga	Málaga Airport	Seasonal	
Sri Lanka	Colombo	Bandaranaike International Airport		
Sudan	Khartoum	Khartoum International Airport	Terminated	
Sweden	Stockholm	Stockholm Arlanda Airport	Terminated	
Switzerland	Geneva	Geneva Airport		
Switzerland	Zurich	Zurich Airport	Seasonal	
Syria	Damascus	Damascus International Airport		
Thailand	Bangkok	Don Mueang International Airport	Terminated	
Thailand	Bangkok	Suvarnabhumi Airport		
Thailand	Phuket	Phuket International Airport	Terminated	
Turkey	Antalya	Antalya Airport	Seasonal	
Turkey	Bodrum	Milas–Bodrum Airport	Seasonal	
Turkey	Istanbul	Atatürk Airport	Airport closed	
Turkey	Istanbul	Istanbul Airport		
Turkey	Istanbul	Istanbul Sabiha Gökçen International Airport		
Turkey	İzmir	İzmir Adnan Menderes Airport	Terminated	
Turkey	Trabzon	Trabzon Airport	Seasonal	
United Arab Emirates	Abu Dhabi	Zayed International Airport		
United Arab Emirates	Dubai	Dubai International Airport		
United Arab Emirates	Ras Al Khaimah	Ras Al Khaimah International Airport	Terminated	
United Arab Emirates	Sharjah	Sharjah International Airport	Terminated	
United Kingdom	London	Heathrow Airport		
United Kingdom	Manchester	Manchester Airport		
United States	Chicago	O'Hare International Airport	Terminated	
United States	New York City	John F. Kennedy International Airport		
Vietnam	Hanoi	Noi Bai International Airport	Terminated	
Vietnam	Ho Chi Minh City	Tan Son Nhat International Airport	Terminated	
Yemen	Aden	Aden International Airport	Terminated	
Yemen	Sanaa	Sanaa International Airport	Terminated	
