= Persian Gulf Airport =

Persian Gulf International Airport فرودگاه بین‌المللی خلیج فارس
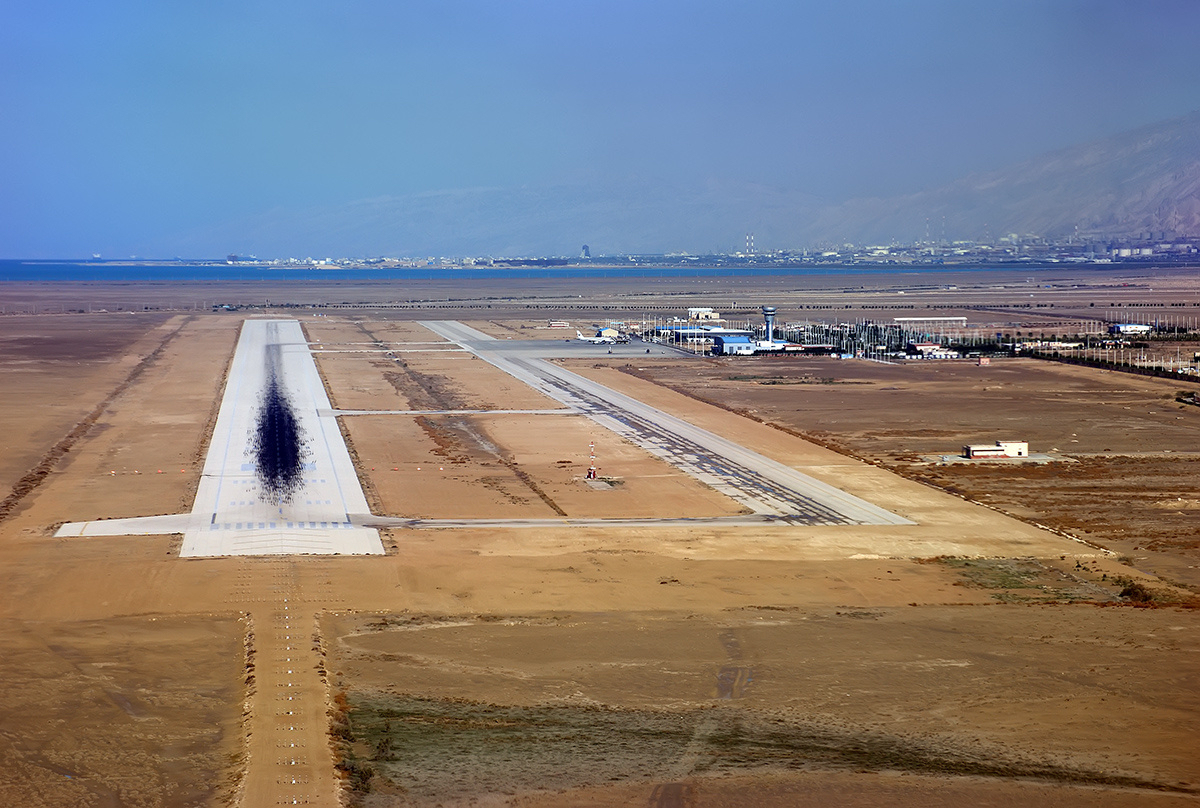
- IATA: PGU; ICAO: OIBP

Summary
- Airport type: Public
- Owner: Iranian Ministry of Oil
- Operator: Iran Airports Company
- Serves: Asaluyeh, Iran
- Location: Pars Special Economy Energy Zone, Asaluyeh, Iran
- Focus city for: Saha Airlines
- Time zone: IRST (UTC+3:30)
  - Summer (DST): IRDT (UTC+04:30)
- Elevation AMSL: 27 ft / 8 m
- Coordinates: 27°22′46″N 052°44′15″E
- Website: http://www.pseez.ir/home-en.html

Map
- Location of airport in Iran

Runways
Direction	Length		Surface
Direction	m	ft	Surface
13/31	3,997	13,115	Asphalt

Statistics (2017)
- Aircraft Movements: 6,469 ▲9%
- Passengers: 852,990 ▲6%
- Cargo: 5,467 tons ▲3%
- Source: Iran Airports Company

Persian Gulf Airport (Persian: فرودگاه خلیج فارس) (IATA: PGU, ICAO: OIBP) is an airport in Asaluyeh, in Iran's Bushehr province.

The airport has been operating since 2005 and, though small, enjoys one of the most modern passenger terminal buildings recently built in the region. There are frequent scheduled and charter passenger flights every day operated by major Iranian airlines to cities across Iran, including Tehran, Mashhad, Isfahan, Shiraz, Kermanshah, Tabriz, Ahwaz, Rasht, and Kish Island

== Development Phase ==
A development phase for the airport has been designed and approved by officials. The project will cost about US$62 million and include a new four-kilometer runway and a new 14,000 square-meter terminal. The latter will have seven air-bridges and be connected to the current terminal by a corridor. On completion of the project, the international and domestic terminals will be separate, although both will use the air-bridges. Project studies and engineering have been finished and execution activities are in preparation.

== Airlines and destinations ==
Airlines	Destinations
Asa Jet	Arak, Kerman, Rasht, Tehran–Mehrabad
ATA Airlines	Tehran–Mehrabad
Caspian Airlines	Isfahan, Mashhad, Shiraz, Tabriz, Tehran–Mehrabad
FlyPersia	Shiraz, Tehran–Mehrabad
Iran Air	Kish, Tehran–Mehrabad
Iran Airtour	Tehran–Mehrabad
Iran Aseman Airlines	Gorgan, Shahrekord, Shiraz, Tehran–Mehrabad
Karun Airlines	Ahvaz, Isfahan, Kermanshah, Mashhad, Tehran–Mehrabad
Kish Air	Isfahan, Kish, Mashhad, Shiraz, Tehran–Mehrabad
Mahan Air	Ahvaz, Isfahan, Mashhad, Tabriz, Tehran–Mehrabad
Meraj Airlines	Isfahan, Mashhad, Tabriz, Tehran–Mehrabad
Pars Air	Isfahan, Tehran–Mehrabad
Pouya Air	Tehran–Mehrabad
Qeshm Air	Gorgan, Sari, Tehran–Mehrabad
Saha Airlines	Isfahan, Mashhad, Rasht, Sari, Shiraz, Tehran–Mehrabad
Sepehran Airlines	Mashhad, Tehran–Mehrabad
Varesh Airlines	Sari

== See also ==
- Iran Civil Aviation Organization
- List of airlines of Iran
- List of airports in Iran
- List of the busiest airports in Iran
- Transport in Iran
