= Urmia Shahid Bakeri International Airport =

Airport in Iran

Urmia Shahid Bakeri International Airport فرودگاه بین‌المللی شهید باکری ارومیه
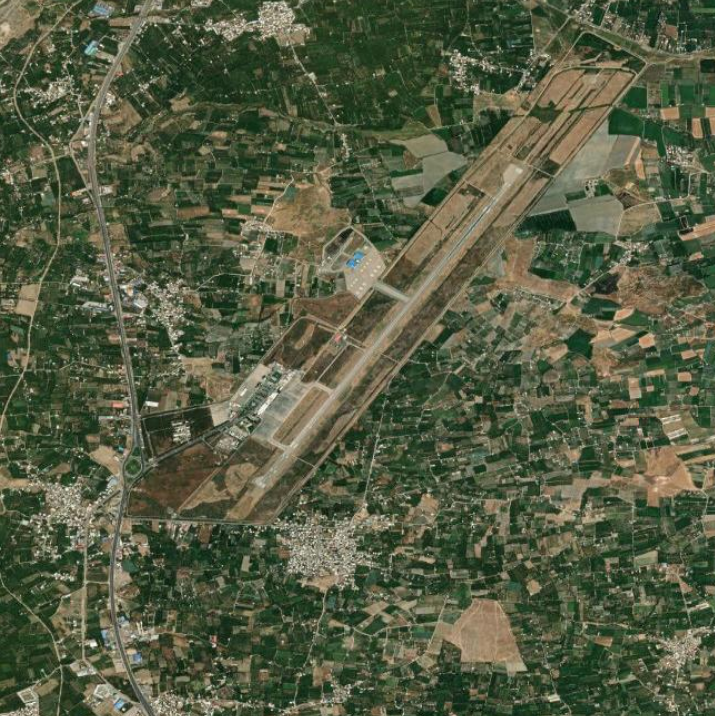
- IATA: OMH; ICAO: OITR

Summary
- Airport type: Public
- Owner: Government of Iran
- Operator: Iran Airports Company
- Serves: Urmia, West Azerbaijan
- Location: Urmia, Iran
- Elevation AMSL: 4,343 ft (1,324 m)
- Coordinates: 37°40′05″N 045°04′07″E

Map
- Location of airport in Iran

Runways
Direction	Length		Surface
Direction	m	ft	Surface
03/21	3,249	10,658	Asphalt

Statistics (2017)
- Aircraft movements: 3,680 ▲3%
- Passengers: 451,967 ▲15%
- Cargo: 3,089 tons ▲16%
- Source: Iran Airports Company

Urmia Shahid Bakeri International Airport (Persian: فرودگاه بین‌المللی شهید باکری ارومیه) (IATA: OMH, ICAO: OITR) is an airport serving the Central District of Urmia County, West Azerbaijan province, Iran.

== Airlines and destinations ==
Airlines	Destinations
ATA Airlines	Mashhad, Tehran–Mehrabad
AVA Airlines	Tehran–Mehrabad
Caspian Airlines	Tehran–Mehrabad
Chabahar Airlines	Tehran–Mehrabad
Iran Air	Mashhad, Tehran–Mehrabad; Seasonal: Jeddah, Medina
Iran Airtour	Mashhad, Tehran–Mehrabad
Iran Aseman Airlines	Mashhad, Tehran–Mehrabad
Karun Airlines	Tehran–Mehrabad
Kish Air	Kish
Mahan Air	Tehran–Mehrabad
Pouya Air	Tehran–Mehrabad
Qeshm Air	Tehran–Mehrabad
Varesh Airlines	Mashhad, Tehran–Mehrabad

== Accidents and incidents ==
- On 9 January 2011, Iran Air Flight 277 crashed after a go-around was initiated during final approach in bad weather conditions, killing 77.
