= SRY (disambiguation) =

SRY is the HUGO Gene Nomenclature Committee assigned symbol for the mammalian gene "sex determining region Y".

SRY is an abbreviation that can also mean:

- Southern Railway of British Columbia
- Shoeburyness railway station (National Rail station code SRY)
- Surrey (Chapman code SRY and ISO 3166-2:GB geocode GB-SRY)
- Dasht-e Naz Airport IATA code
- "Sorry" (see Suffering), as a slang abbreviation for an expression of sympathy for another's suffering
