= Mashhad Shahid Hasheminejad International Airport =

Mashhad International Airport فرودگاه بین‌المللی شهید هاشمی‌نژاد مشهد
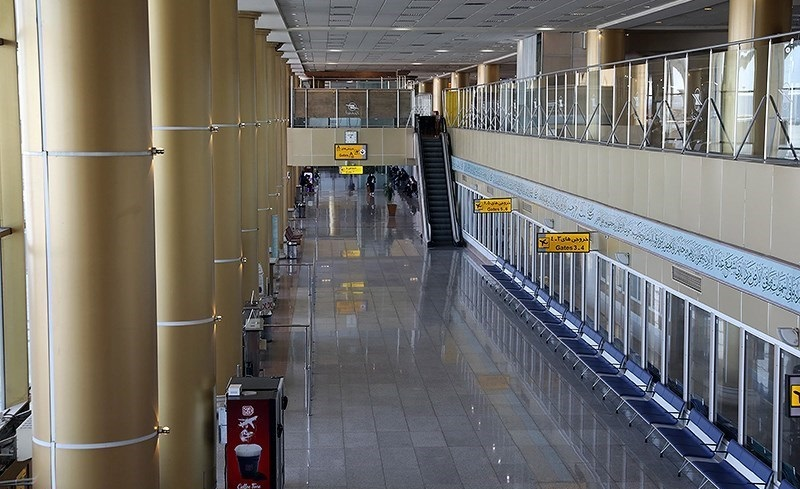
- IATA: MHD; ICAO: OIMM

Summary
- Airport type: Public / Military
- Owner: Government of Iran
- Operator: Iran Airports Company; Iranian Air Force; Islamic Republic of Iran Army Aviation; Islamic Revolutionary Guard Corps; Iranian Police Aviation; Islamic Republic of Iran Air Defense Force
- Serves: Mashhad, Razavi Khorasan
- Location: Mashhad, Iran
- Hub for: ATA Airlines; AVA Airlines; Caspian Airlines; Iran Airtour; Iran Aseman Airlines; Kish Air; Meraj Airlines; Sepehran Airlines; Taban Air; Varesh Airlines; Zagros Airlines
- Focus city for: Iran Air; Mahan Air; Qeshm Air
- Elevation AMSL: 3,263 ft (995 m)
- Coordinates: 36°14′06″N 59°38′27″E
- Website: mashhad.airport.ir

Map
- Location of airport in Iran

Runways
Direction	Length		Surface
Direction	ft	m	Surface
13R/31L	12,877	3,925	Asphalt
13L/31R	12,503	3,811	Asphalt

Statistics (2017)
- Passengers: 10,459,377 ▲4%
- Aircraft movements: 73,499 ▲5%
- Cargo: 94,029 tons ▲8%
- Source: Iran Airports Company

Mashhad International Airport (Persian: فرودگاه بین‌المللی شهید هاشمی‌نژاد مشهد) (IATA: MHD, ICAO: OIMM) is an international airport located in Mashhad, Razavi Khorasan province, Iran. The airbase serves jointly as a civilian airport and a military airbase.

== Overview ==
Mashhad international airport is Iran's second-busiest airport, behind Tehran Mehrabad Airport. In 2016, Mashhad Airport handled a record 10 million-plus passengers, up 17% from 2015, along with 86,681 tons of cargo. It has flights to 57 destinations, including frequent flights to 30 Iranian cities, and 27 destinations in Central Asia, the Middle East, East Asia and Europe.

Mashhad International Airport has three terminals: a domestic flight terminal (Terminal 1), an international flight terminal (Terminal 2), and a Hajj flight terminal (Terminal 3).

The airbase serves jointly as a civilian airport and a military airbase.

== Airlines and destinations ==
The following airlines operate passenger flights at Mashhad International Airport:

Airlines	Destinations
Air1Air	Kish, Tehran–Mehrabad
Air Arabia	Sharjah
Asa Jet	Abadan, Isfahan, Tabriz, Tehran–Mehrabad
ATA Airlines	Abadan, Ahvaz, Ardabil, Baghdad (suspended), Bushehr, Isfahan, Kerman, Kermanshah, Kish, Kuwait City, Najaf (suspended), Rasht, Sari, Shiraz, Tabriz, Tehran–Mehrabad, Urmia, Yazd, Zahedan
AVA Airlines	Abadan, Ahvaz, Baghdad (suspended), Isfahan, Kermanshah, Kish, Najaf (suspended), Tehran–Mehrabad
Caspian Airlines	Abadan, Ahvaz, Asaluyeh, Bushehr, Chabahar/Konarak, Hamadan, Isfahan, Kerman, Khorramabad, Kish, Najaf (suspended), Noshahr, Qeshm, Rasht, Sari, Shiraz, Tabriz, Tehran–Mehrabad, Yazd, Zahedan
Chabahar Airlines	Isfahan, Tehran–Mehrabad
Flydubai	Dubai–International
Fly Kish	Isfahan, Kish, Qeshm, Tehran–Mehrabad, Yazd
Flynas	Seasonal: Jeddah
FlyPersia	Abadan, Isfahan, Kish, Shiraz, Tehran–Mehrabad, Yazd
Iran Air	Ahmedabad, Ahvaz, Birjand, Dammam, Isfahan, Kabul, Karachi, Kuwait City, Lahore, Najaf (suspended), Quetta, Shiraz, Tehran–Mehrabad, Urmia, Zahedan Istanbul Baku (suspended); Seasonal: Jeddah, Medina
Iran Airtour	Abadan, Ahvaz, Baghdad (suspended), Bandar Abbas, Bushehr, Chabahar/Konarak, Dubai–International, Isfahan, Kabul, Kermanshah, Kish, Lahore, Najaf (suspended), Rasht, Shiraz, Tabriz, Tehran–Mehrabad, Urmia, Zahedan
Iran Aseman Airlines	Abadan, Ahvaz, Ardabil, Bushehr, Chabahar/Konarak, Gorgan, Ilam, Isfahan, Kish, Najaf (suspended), Ramsar, Rasht, Sari, Shiraz, Tabriz, Tehran–Mehrabad, Urmia, Yazd, Zahedan
Iraqi Airways	Baghdad, Najaf
Jazeera Airways	Kuwait City
Karun Airlines	Ahvaz, Asaluyeh, Dezful, Mahshahr, Tehran–Mehrabad
Kish Air	Ahvaz, Asaluyeh, Bandar Abbas, Isfahan, Kabul, Kandahar, Kish, Kuwait City, Lahore, Lamerd, Rasht, Sari, Shiraz, Tehran–Mehrabad, Yazd
Kuwait Airways	Kuwait City
Mahan Air	Ardabil, Asaluyeh, Baghdad (suspended), Beirut, Chabahar/Konarak, Isfahan, Kabul, Kerman, Kish, Saravan, Tehran–Mehrabad, Zabol, Zanjan
Meraj Airlines	Asaluyeh, Baghdad (suspended), Isfahan, Kish, Najaf (suspended), Qeshm, Tabriz, Tehran–Mehrabad
Nasim Air	Abadan, Tehran–Mehrabad
Oman Air	Muscat
Pars Air	Abadan, Baghdad (suspended), Isfahan, Kerman, Najaf (suspended), Shiraz, Tehran–Mehrabad
Pouya Air	Bandar Abbas, Chabahar/Konarak, Gorgan, Tabriz, Tehran–Mehrabad, Yazd
Qatar Airways	Doha
Qeshm Air	Abadan, Ahvaz, Isfahan, Muscat, Najaf (suspended), Qeshm, Shiraz, Tehran–Mehrabad, Zabol, Zahedan
Raimon Airways	Dushanbe, Rasht, Yazd
Saha Airlines	Asaluyeh, Isfahan, Shiraz, Tehran–Mehrabad, Yazd
SalamAir	Muscat
Sepehran Airlines	Abadan, Ahvaz, Baghdad (suspended), Bandar Abbas, Chabahar/Konarak, Dubai–International, Isfahan, Kermanshah, Kish, Kuwait City, Muscat, Najaf (suspended), Shiraz, Tabriz, Tehran–Mehrabad
Taban Air	Abadan, Ahvaz, Baghdad (suspended), Isfahan, Karachi, Kish, Lahore, Muscat, Najaf (suspended), Qeshm, Rasht, Sari, Shiraz, Tabriz, Tehran–Mehrabad, Yazd, Zahedan
Varesh Airlines	Abadan, Ahvaz, Baghdad (suspended), Dushanbe, Isfahan, Kish, Kuwait City, Najaf (suspended), Qeshm, Sari, Shiraz, Tabriz, Tehran–Mehrabad, Urmia, Yazd
Yazd Airways	Tehran–Mehrabad, Yazd
Zagros Airlines	Abadan, Ahvaz, Bushehr, Chabahar/Konarak, Ilam, Isfahan, Kish, Najaf (suspended), Qeshm, Shiraz, Tabriz, Tehran–Mehrabad

== Statistics ==
=== Annual traffic ===
Annual passenger traffic
Year	Passengers	% change
2010	5,983,227	Steady
2011	6,039,787	▲1%
2012	6,833,537	▲13%
2013	6,985,882	▲2%
2014	8,068,767	▲16%
2015	8,545,598	▲6%
2016	10,030,230	▲17%
2017	10,459,377	▲4%

== Accidents and incidents ==
- In 1988, Kuwait Airways Flight 422, was hijacked and then diverted to Mashhad. The hijackers made some demands and then ordered the plane to fly to Cyprus and Algeria.
- On 1 September 2006, Iran Air Tours Flight 945, a Tupolev Tu-154 flying from Bandar Abbas skidded off the Mashhad runway after a tire blew during landing. The aircraft caught fire, and 28 of the 147 people on board died in the accident.
- On 24 July 2009, Aria Air Flight 1525, an Ilyushin Il-62, route THR-MHD (Tehran Mehrabad, to Mashhad) crashed with 173 people on board and caught fire; five passengers and 11 crew members died.
- On 24 January 2010, Taban Air Flight 6437, a Tupolev Tu-154M, crashed while making an emergency landing at the airport due to a medical emergency; all 157 passengers and 13 crew survived the accident; 42 received minor injuries. It was reported that the aircraft was on an ILS landing in fog when the tail struck the ground, causing the plane to veer off the runway. This was followed by a nose gear collapse, then the right wing struck the ground, causing the aircraft to burst into flames.
- On 28 January 2016, Zagros Airlines Flight 4010 was landing at Runway 31R when the McDonnell Douglas MD-83, registration EP-ZAB, skidded off the runway. The aircraft was damaged beyond repair and seven people suffered minor injuries.
- On 24 May 2018, the Tapandegan (Palpitaters in Persian), an Iranian hacker group, hacked the arrival and departure monitors at the airport, posting anti-government messages and images on the monitors, forcing airport authorities to manually turn off the monitors one by one.
- On 15 June 2025 during the Iran–Israel war, it was reported that the Israeli Air Force bombed an aerial refueling plane at the airport.

== See also ==
- List of the busiest airports in Iran
- Tehran's International Airport
- List of the busiest airports in the Middle East
