= Kharg Airport =

Kharg Airport فرودگاه خارگ
- IATA: KHK; ICAO: OIBQ

Summary
- Airport type: Public
- Owner: Iran Ministry of Petroleum
- Operator: Iran Airports Company; Islamic Republic of Iran Air Defense Force
- Serves: Kharg, Bushehr
- Location: Kharg Island, Iran
- Elevation AMSL: 17 ft / 5 m
- Coordinates: 29°15′34″N 050°19′24″E

Map
- Location of airport in Iran

Runways
Direction	Length		Surface
Direction	m	ft	Surface
14/32	1,805	5,922	Asphalt

Kharg Airport (IATA: KHK, ICAO: OIBQ) (Persian: فرودگاه خارگ) is a regional airport located in city of Kharg, Bushehr Province, in southern Iran.

The airport is used by the Iran Ministry of Petroleum for transferring employees of Iran Oil Company by Karun Airlines and Mahan Air. The airport is operated by Iran Airports Company.

== Airlines and destinations ==
Airlines	Destinations
Karun Airlines	Ahvaz, Bushehr, Isfahan, Shiraz, Tehran–Mehrabad
Qeshm Air	Isfahan, Shiraz, Tehran–Mehrabad
