= Iran Airtour Flight 945 =

2006 aviation accident

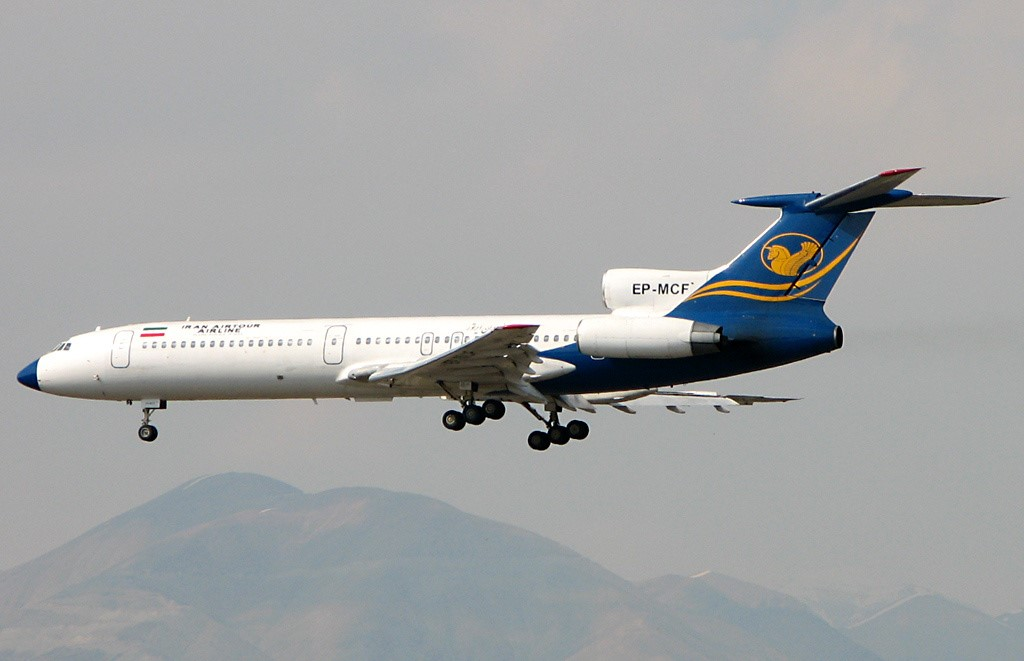
- EP-MCF, the aircraft involved in the accident, seen five months prior

Accident
- Date: September 1, 2006
- Summary: Crashed on landing; cause undetermined
- Site: Mashhad International Airport, Mashhad, Iran; 36.2333°N 59.6417°E

Aircraft
- Aircraft type: Tupolev Tu-154M
- Operator: Iran Airtour
- IATA flight No.: B9945
- ICAO flight No.: IRB945
- Call sign: IRAN AIRTOUR 945
- Registration: EP-MCF
- Flight origin: Bandar Abbas Airport, Bandar Abbas, Iran
- Destination: Mashhad International Airport, Mashhad, Iran
- Occupants: 148
- Passengers: 137
- Crew: 11
- Fatalities: 28
- Survivors: 120

On 1 September 2006, an Iran Airtour Tu-154 aircraft traveling from Bandar Abbas with 11 crew and 137 passengers on board burst into flames upon landing in Mashhad, Iran, at 13:45 local time killing 28 of those on board.

== Possible causes ==
The specific cause is not known, however it is believed that the nose gear tire blew on landing.

== Aircraft ==
The aircraft had been in active service since 1988 and had approximately 19,000 hours of flight time over about 2,200 flights. It was originally owned by Aeroflot. The plane was leased by Iran Airtour in August 2005 after having been operated by a number of other carriers.
