= Abadan Ayatollah Jami International Airport =

Abadan International Airport فرودگاه بین‌المللی آبادان
- IATA: ABD; ICAO: OIAA

Summary
- Airport type: Public
- Owner: Government of Iran
- Operator: Iran Airports Company
- Serves: Abadan, Khuzestan
- Location: Abadan, Iran
- Elevation AMSL: 7 ft / 2 m
- Coordinates: 30°21′55″N 048°13′59″E

Map
- Location of airport in Iran

Runways
Direction	Length		Surface
Direction	m	ft	Surface
14R/32L	3,101	10,174	Asphalt
14L/32R	2,265	7,430	Asphalt

Statistics (2017)
- Aircraft movements: 6,425 ▼5%
- Passengers: 644,915 ▲0%
- Cargo: 5,669 tonnes ▲0%
- Source: Iran Airports Company

Abadan International Airport (IATA: ABD, ICAO: OIAA) is situated 12 kilometres (7.5 mi) away from the city of Abadan, Iran.

== History ==
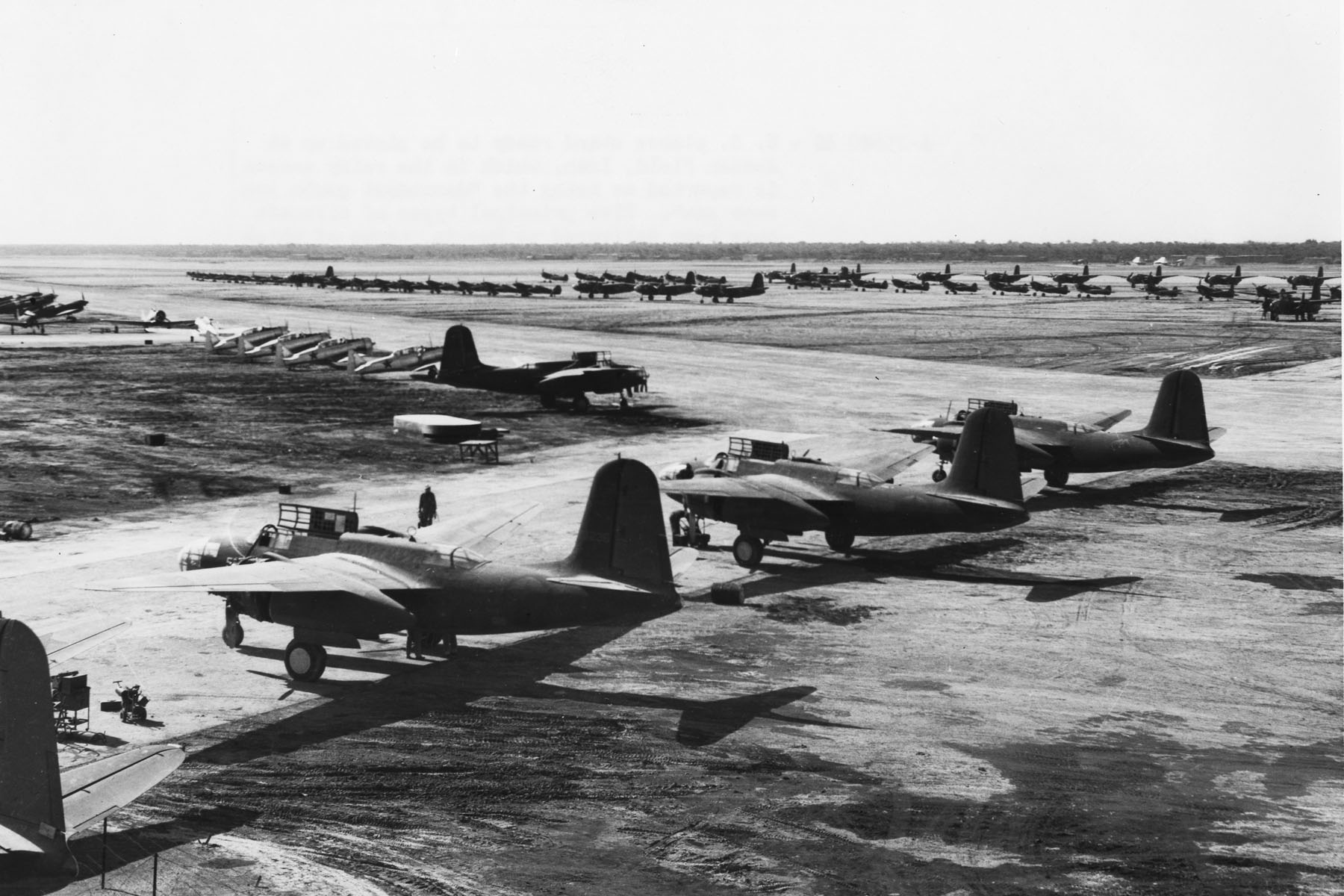
U.S. planes stand ready to be picked up at Abadan Field (1942).

During World War II, Abadan Airport was a major logistics center for Lend-Lease aircraft being sent to the Soviet Union by the United States. Beginning in May 1942, the United States Army Air Forces Air Technical Service Command and the Douglas Aircraft Company established a plant at the airport, with the 17th Air Depot Group assembling newly arrived aircraft and flight-testing them. Once prepared, they were flown to Mehrabad Airport at Tehran for delivery to the Soviets. The airport was designated Station #3 by the Air Transport Command North African Wing, with connecting routes to Mehrabad Airport, Tehran; RAF Habbaniya, Iraq, and Bahrain Airport, Bahrain.

In 1977, it was upgraded as an international airport with the first scheduled international flight to Kuwait City, which was served by a flag carrier Iran Air and operated until 1980, leaving the airport without international flights. In the period 1977 to late 1978, Iran Air operated flights IR754/755 to London Heathrow via Athens, three times weekly. This service discontinued with the start of the Iranian revolution in December 1978.

== Airlines and destinations ==
The following airlines offer scheduled passenger service:

Airlines	Destinations
Asa Jet	Isfahan, Mashhad, Tehran–Mehrabad
ATA Airlines	Mashhad, Tehran–Mehrabad
AVA Airlines	Mashhad
Caspian Airlines	Mashhad, Tehran–Mehrabad
Chabahar Airlines	Tehran–Mehrabad
FlyPersia	Mashhad, Shiraz, Tehran–Mehrabad
Iran Air	Tehran–Mehrabad
Iran Airtour	Mashhad
Iran Aseman Airlines	Isfahan, Mashhad, Shiraz, Tehran–Mehrabad
Kish Air	Kish, Tehran–Mehrabad
Nasim Air	Mashhad
Pars Air	Kish, Mashhad, Tehran–Mehrabad
Pouya Air	Tehran–Mehrabad
Qeshm Air	Mashhad, Tehran–Mehrabad
Sepehran Airlines	Mashhad
Taban Air	Mashhad
Varesh Airlines	Mashhad, Tehran–Mehrabad
Zagros Airlines	Mashhad, Tehran–Mehrabad

== Incidents and accidents ==
- On 10 September 1958, Mariner P-303 was being ferried to the Netherlands from Biak, Indonesia. Due to technical problems, a forced landing was carried out at Abadan, Iran. About two weeks later, repairs had been accomplished, and the aircraft took off. Shortly after takeoff, an oil leak was observed on engine number one. While on finals for landing at Abadan, the aircraft suddenly lost height and crashed, killing all aboard. It appeared that the remaining propeller reversed thrust, causing the crew to lose control.
- On 24 January 2010, Taban Air Flight 6437, a Tupolev Tu-154M, crashed whilst making an emergency landing at Mashhad International Airport due to a medical emergency; all 157 and 13 crew survived the accident with 42 receiving minor injuries. The flight originated from Abadan the day before but had to overnight stop in Isfahan due to weather in Mashhad.
