= Zagros Airlines =

Iranian airline

Zagros Airlines شرکت هواپیمایی زاگرس Šerkat-e Havâpeymâyi-ye Zâgros

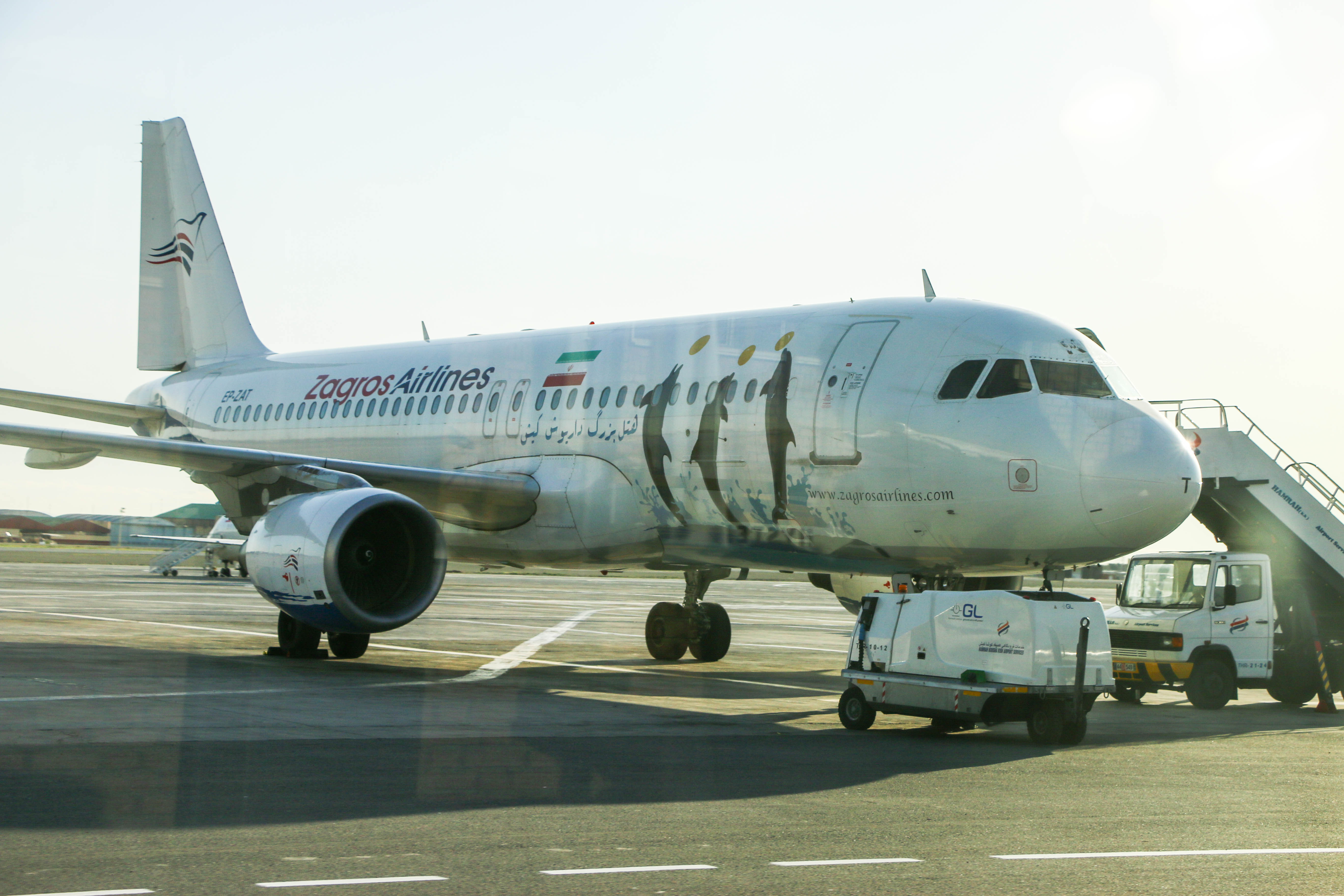
- Zagros A320
IATA	ICAO	Call sign
ZO	IZG	ZAGROS
- Founded: 2005; 21 years ago
- Hubs: Mashhad Shahid Hasheminejad International Airport; Tehran Imam Khomeini International Airport; Tehran Mehrabad International Airport
- Subsidiaries: Zagros Regional; ZagrosScoot
- Fleet size: 11
- Destinations: 23
- Parent company: Zagros Group
- Headquarters: Tehran, Iran
- Key people: Abdolreza Mousavi, owner
- Website: www.zagrosairlines.com

Zagros Airlines (Persian: شرکت هواپیمایی زاگرس, Šerkat-e Havâpeymâyi-ye Zâgros) is an Iranian airline headquartered in Tehran and based at Mehrabad International Airport.

== History ==
Previous logo

Previous logo

Zagros Airlines was founded in 2005 in Abadan, Iran. The airline uses Mehrabad International Airport and Mashhad International Airport as its operating bases. In 2007, Zagros Airlines started its first international route from Tehran to the Syrian capital of Damascus.

In September 2013, the airline took delivery of an Airbus A320-200. In January 2016, Zagros Airlines acquired Iran's first A319. On March 14, 2017, the airline acquired its first A321-200 through wet lease from Khors Aircompany.

In June 2017, it was announced that the airline had signed a memorandum of understanding with Airbus for an order of 20 A320neo and 8 A330neo aircraft. However, the order could never be placed due to newly imposed sanctions.

In July 2019, Neshat Jahandari became both the first Iranian female pilot to operate a passenger airliner since the 1979 Iranian Revolution on a passenger airliner in Iran (Note: While widely recognized as the first female pilot to operate a passenger airliner since the 1979 Iranian Revolution, this claim is disputed and there is no agreement on who the first female Iranian pilot was since the Iranian Revolution.) and the youngest McDonnell Douglas MD-80 captain in Zagros Airlines. In October 2019, exactly 3 months after Jahandari joined the airline, she was part of the first flight manned by an all-female flight crew in Iran, as well as in the Middle East.

== Destinations ==
As of May 2023, Zagros Airlines operated flights to the following destinations:

Country	City	Airport	Notes	Refs
Georgia	Batumi	Batumi International Airport	Seasonal	
Georgia	Tbilisi	Tbilisi International Airport		
Iran	Abadan	Ayatollah Jami International Airport		
Iran	Ahvaz	Qasem Soleimani International Airport		
Iran	Ardabil	Ardabil Airport		
Iran	Bandar Abbas	Bandar Abbas International Airport		
Iran	Bushehr	Bushehr Airport		
Iran	Chabahar	Chabahar Konarak Airport		
Iran	Isfahan	Shahid Beheshti International Airport		
Iran	Kerman	Ayatollah Hashemi Rafsanjani Airport		
Iran	Kish	Kish International Airport		
Iran	Mashhad	Shahid Hasheminejad International Airport	Hub	
Iran	Qeshm	Qeshm International Airport		
Iran	Shiraz	Shahid Dastgheib International Airport		
Iran	Tabriz	Shahid Madani International Airport		
Iran	Tehran	Imam Khomeini International Airport	Hub	
Iran	Tehran	Mehrabad International Airport	Hub	
Iraq	Baghdad	Baghdad International Airport		
Iraq	Najaf	Al Najaf International Airport		
Uzbekistan	Tashkent	Islam Karimov Tashkent International Airport		

== Fleet ==
=== Current fleet ===
As of July 2026, Zagros Airlines operates the following aircraft:

Zagros Airlines fleet
Aircraft	In service	Orders	Passengers			Notes
Aircraft	In service	Orders	J	Y	Total	Notes
Airbus A319	1	—	—	142	142	
Airbus A320	2	—	16	132	148	
McDonnell Douglas MD-82	5	—	—	157	157	
McDonnell Douglas MD-83	3	—	—	172	172	
Total	11	—				

=== Former fleet ===
As of August 2025, Zagros Airlines operated 1 Airbus A319, 7 Airbus A320, 5 McDonnell Douglas MD-82 and 3 McDonnell Douglas MD-83.

== Accidents and incidents ==
- On 28 January 2016, Zagros Airlines Flight 4010 was landing at Mashhad International Airport's Runway 31R when the McDonnell Douglas MD-83, registration EP-ZAB, skidded off the runway, due to weather conditions. The aircraft was badly damaged but there were no injuries.

== See also ==
- List of airlines of Iran
