= Kermanshah Airport =

- IATA: KSH; ICAO: OICC

Summary
- Airport type: Public/Military
- Owner: Government of Iran
- Operator: Iran Airports Company; Islamic Republic of Iran Army Aviation
- Serves: Kermanshah
- Location: Kermanshah, Iran
- Elevation AMSL: 4,301 ft (1,311 m)
- Coordinates: 34°20′45.07″N 047°09′29.26″E
- Website: http://kermanshah.airport.ir

Map
- Location of airport in Iran

Runways
Direction	Length		Surface
Direction	ft	m	Surface
11/29	11,216	3,419	Asphalt
- Source: World Aero Data

Kermanshah Airport (IATA: KSH, ICAO: OICC) is an airport in Kermanshah, Iran. It serves the city of Kermanshah and the surrounding areas with daily domestic and seasonal international destinations. It is located in the eastern part of the city and shares its land with the Havanirooz 1st Combat Base.

== Airlines and destinations ==
Airlines	Destinations
Asa Jet	Tehran–Mehrabad
ATA Airlines	Mashhad, Tehran–Mehrabad
AVA Airlines	Kish, Mashhad, Tehran–Mehrabad
Caspian Airlines	Asaluyeh
Iran Air	Tehran–Mehrabad
Iran Aseman Airlines	Tehran–Mehrabad
Karun Airlines	Asaluyeh
Mahan Air	Tehran–Mehrabad
Pars Air	Asaluyeh, Shiraz, Tehran–Mehrabad
Pouya Air	Tehran–Mehrabad
Qeshm Air	Qeshm, Tehran–Mehrabad
Sepehran Airlines	Mashhad
Varesh Airlines	Mashhad
