= Saha Airlines =

Iranian airline

Saha Airlines هواپیمایی ساها
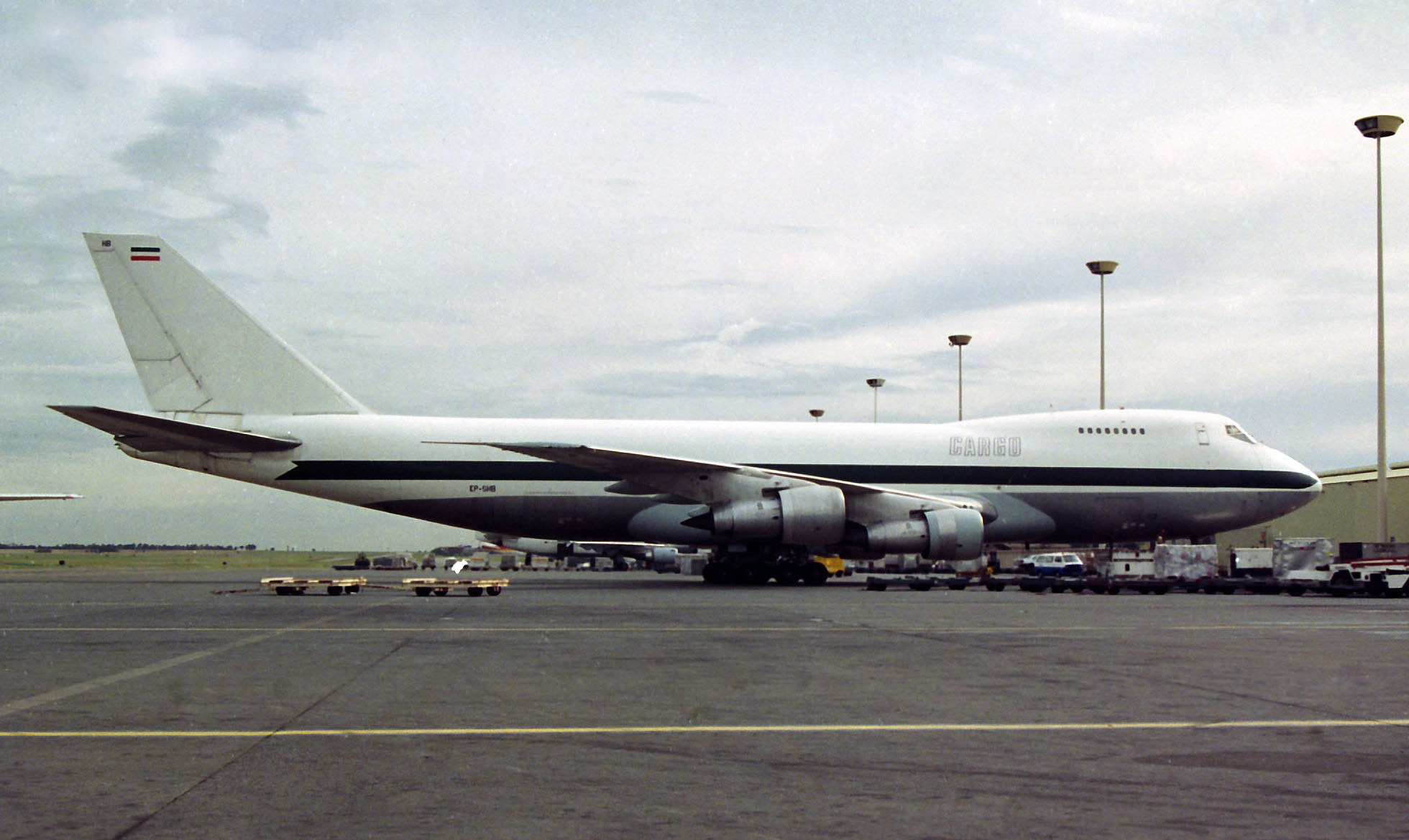
- Boeing 747-200
IATA	ICAO	Call sign
-	IRZ	SAHA
- Founded: 1990; 36 years ago
- Operating bases: Mehrabad International Airport
- Focus cities: Persian Gulf Airport
- Fleet size: 5
- Destinations: 15
- Parent company: Islamic Republic of Iran Air Force
- Headquarters: Tehran, Iran
- Website: sahaair.com

Saha Airlines (Persian: هواپیمایی ساها, Havâpeymâyi-ye Sâhâ) is an Iranian airline based in Tehran that operates scheduled domestic flights. It is owned by the Islamic Republic of Iran Air Force and banned from the European Union. It operates domestic passenger services as well as cargo charters and was the last civil operator of the Boeing 707 in the world.

== History ==
Saha Airlines was established in 1990 and is wholly owned by the Islamic Republic of Iran Air Force for military charters. It initially flew cargo charters from Iran to Singapore. In the summer of 1992 it began to operate with the Fokker F 27 for its civilian charters. In 1998 the airline operated a diverse fleet of Fokker F 28s, Fokker F 27s, Boeing 707s and Boeing 747s.

On 3 May 2013, all flight operations were suspended. Saha Airlines began operating again in 2017 after receiving two Boeing 737 aircraft.

In October 2024. the European Union sanctioned Saha Airlines in response to Iran's shipments of missiles and drones to Russia for the war in Ukraine.

== Destinations ==
Saha Airlines serves the following destinations (as of April 2023):

Country	City	Airport	Notes	Refs
Iran	Ahvaz	Qasem Soleimani International Airport		
Iran	Asaluyeh	Persian Gulf Airport		
Iran	Bandar Abbas	Bandar Abbas International Airport		
Iran	Bushehr	Bushehr Airport		
Iran	Isfahan	Shahid Beheshti International Airport		
Iran	Kish	Kish International Airport		
Iran	Lavan Island	Lavan Airport		
Iran	Mashhad	Shahid Hasheminejad International Airport		
Iran	Qeshm	Qeshm International Airport		
Iran	Rasht	Rasht Airport		
Iran	Sari	Dasht-e Naz Airport		
Iran	Shiraz	Shahid Dastgheib International Airport		
Iran	Tabriz	Shahid Madani International Airport		
Iran	Tehran	Mehrabad International Airport	Hub	
Iran	Yazd	Shahid Sadooghi Airport		

== Fleet ==
=== Current fleet ===
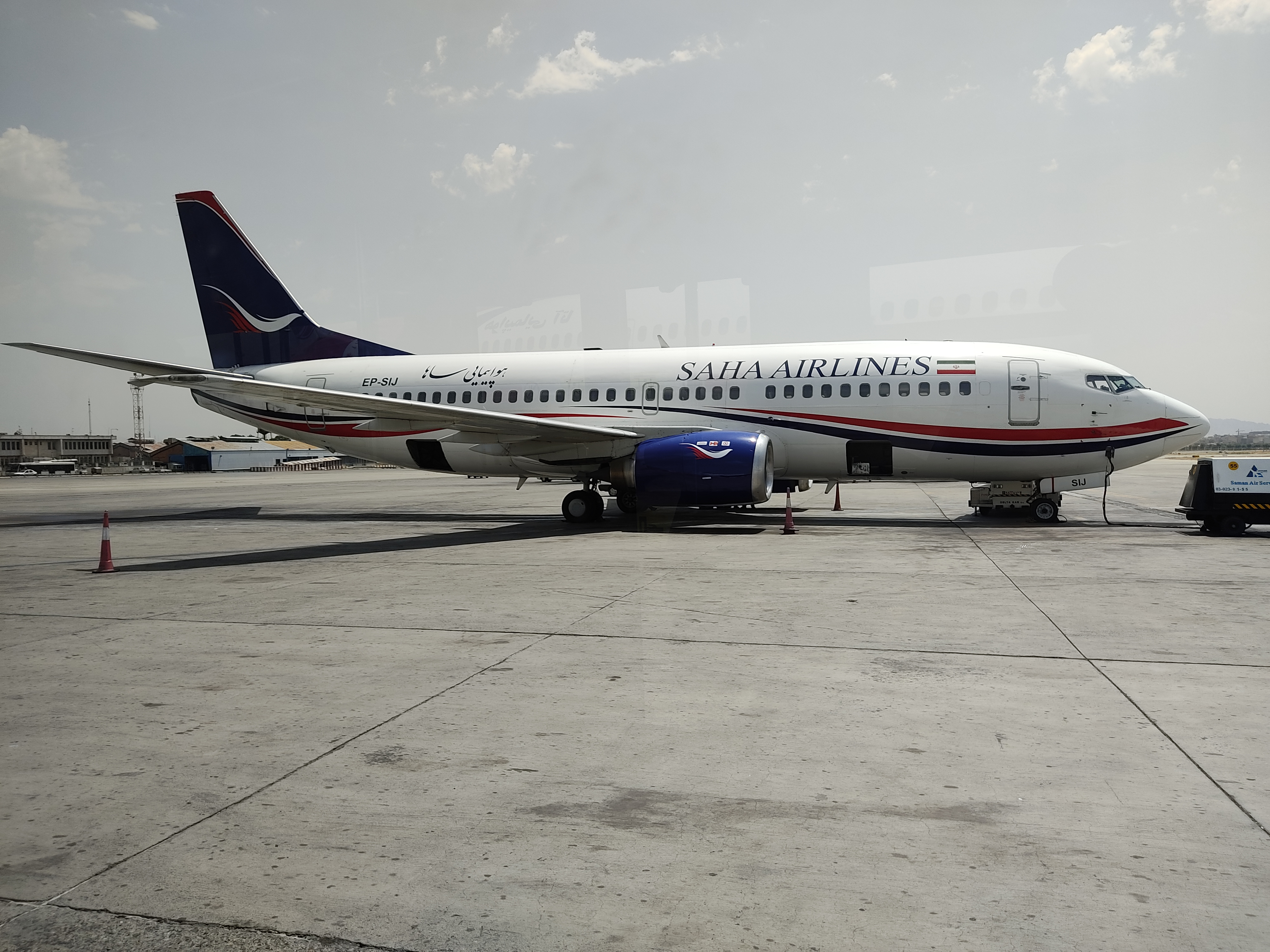
Saha Airlines Boeing 737-300

As of July 2026, Saha Airlines operates the following aircraft:

Saha Airlines fleet
Aircraft	In service	Orders	Notes
Boeing 737-300	4	—	
Boeing 747-200F	1	—	Cargo
Total	5	—	

=== Former fleet ===
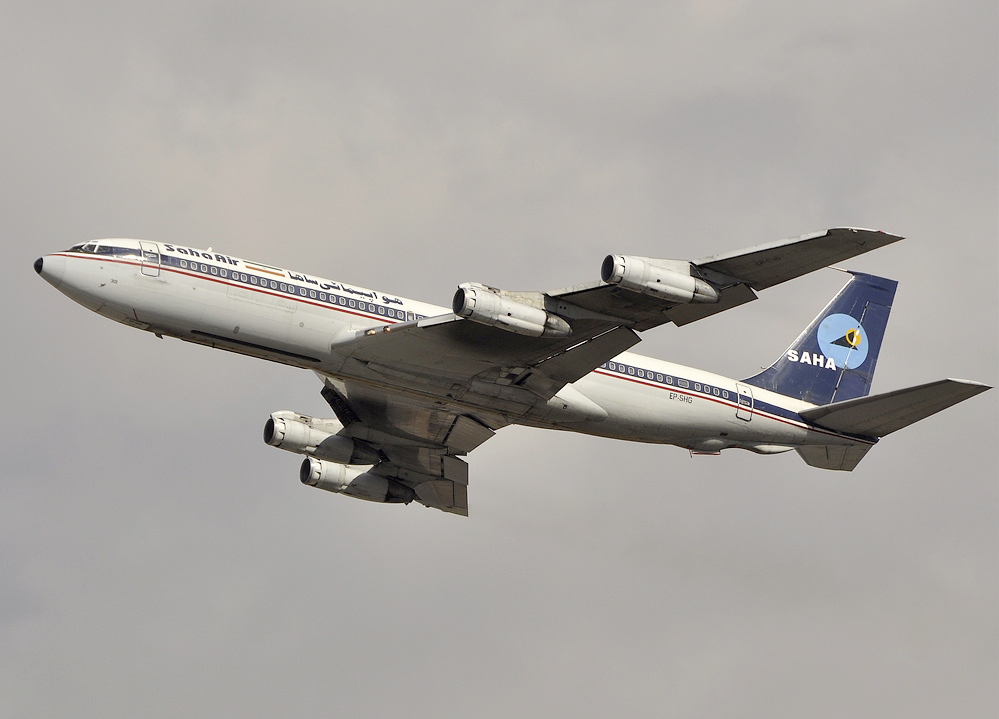
A former Saha Airlines Boeing 707-300 in 2011

As of August 2025, Saha Airlines operated 3 Boeing 737-300 and 1 Boeing 747-200F

Saha Airlines formerly also operated the following aircraft types:

Saha Airlines former fleet
Aircraft	Year Retired	Notes
Boeing 707-300	2019	Crashed in 2019 while on a cargo flight. Was the last commercial 707 in service.

== Accidents and incidents ==
- On 20 April 2005, Saha Airlines Flight 171, a Boeing 707-320C, registration EP-SHE, flying from Kish Island, crashed on landing at Mehrabad Airport, Tehran following an unstabilised approach with a higher than recommended airspeed. Gears and/or a tire failed after touchdown and the flight overran the far end of the runway. Of the 12 crew and 157 passengers on board, three passengers died.
- On August 3, 2009, a Boeing 707-3J9Cof Saha Airlines had an engine fire.
- On 14 Jan 2019, a Boeing 707 freighter crashed near Karaj, Iran The plane was supposed to land at Payam International Airport, but the crew mistakenly landed at Fath Air Base. Of the 16 people on board, only one survived. The aircraft was the last 707 in commercial service worldwide.
