= Karun Airlines =

Iranian airline

Karun Airlines هواپیمایی کارون Havâpeymâyi-ye Kârun
IATA	ICAO	Call sign
NV	IRG	Karun
- Founded: 1992; 34 years ago
- Operating bases: Ahvaz Qasem Soleimani International Airport; Tehran Mehrabad International Airport
- Fleet size: 8
- Destinations: 22
- Headquarters: Ahvaz, Iran & Tehran, Iran
- Key people: M. Parvanezadeh (CEO); S.AMIRMOKRI (managing director)
- Website: https://www.karunair.ir

Karun Airlines (formerly Iranian Naft Airlines) is an airline based in Tehran, Iran. It operates cargo and passenger scheduled and charter services within Iran and to neighbouring regions. Its main bases are Tehran Mehrabad Airport and Ahvaz International Airport with secondary bases at Bandar Abbas International Airport, Isfahan International Airport and Shiraz International Airport.

== History ==
Former logo from 2022.

The airline was established and started operations in 1992. In 2004 it officially became known as Iranian Naft Airline. Owned and operated by the Retirement Organization of National Iranian Oil Company, it has more than 600 employees.

In September 2017, it was announced that the airline was to be renamed as Karun Airlines. In the same year the airline added its Boeing 737 fleet. In 2019 it was sold. In 2022 the airline began its Boeing 737 operations. In 2023 the airline was planning to add the Boeing 777 to its fleet. In 2024 the airline added its first Boeing 737-300. The airline in the same year looked to finance new engines on its fleet.

In 2026 multiple Fokker 50 aircraft owned by Karun Airlines were destroyed in a bombing along with a Pars Air aircraft.

== Destinations ==
As of August 2025, Karun Airlines serves the following destinations:

Country	City	Airport	Notes	Refs
Iran	Ahvaz	Qasem Soleimani International Airport	Hub	
Iran	Asaluyeh	Persian Gulf Airport		
Iran	Kermanshah	Kermanshah International Airport		
Iran	Bandar Abbas	Bandar Abbas International Airport		
Iran	Bushehr	Bushehr Airport		
Iran	Dezful	Dezful Airport		
Iran	Isfahan	Shahid Beheshti International Airport		
Iran	Kharg	Kharg Airport		
Iran	Kish	Kish International Airport		
Iran	Lamerd	Lamerd International Airport		
Iran	Lavan Island	Lavan Airport		
Iran	Mahshahr	Mahshahr Airport		
Iran	Mashhad	Shahid Hasheminejad International Airport		
Iran	Rasht	Rasht Airport		
Iran	Shiraz	Shahid Dastgheib International Airport		
Iran	Sirri Island	Sirri Island Airport		
Iran	Tabriz	Shahid Madani International Airport		
Iran	Tehran	Mehrabad International Airport	Hub	
Iran	Yazd	Shahid Sadooghi Airport		
Kuwait	Kuwait City	Kuwait International Airport		
Oman	Muscat	Muscat International Airport	Terminated	
United Arab Emirates	Dubai	Dubai International Airport	Terminated	
Turkey	Istanbul	Istanbul Airport		

== Fleet ==
=== Current fleet ===
As of July 2026, Karun Airlines operates the following aircraft:

Karun Airlines fleet
Aircraft	In service	Orders	Passengers	Notes
Boeing 737-300	2	_	149	
Fokker 50	2	—	50	
Fokker 100	4	—	100	
Total	8	—		

=== Former fleet ===
As of August 2025, Karun Airlines operated 4 Boeing 737-300, 2 Fokker 50 and 4 Fokker 100.

The airline also previously operated a Boeing 737-300, leased from Khors Aircompany.

== Accident ==
- In 2026 multiple Fokker F 50s of the airline was destroyed

== See also ==
- List of airlines of Iran
