= Ardabil Airport =

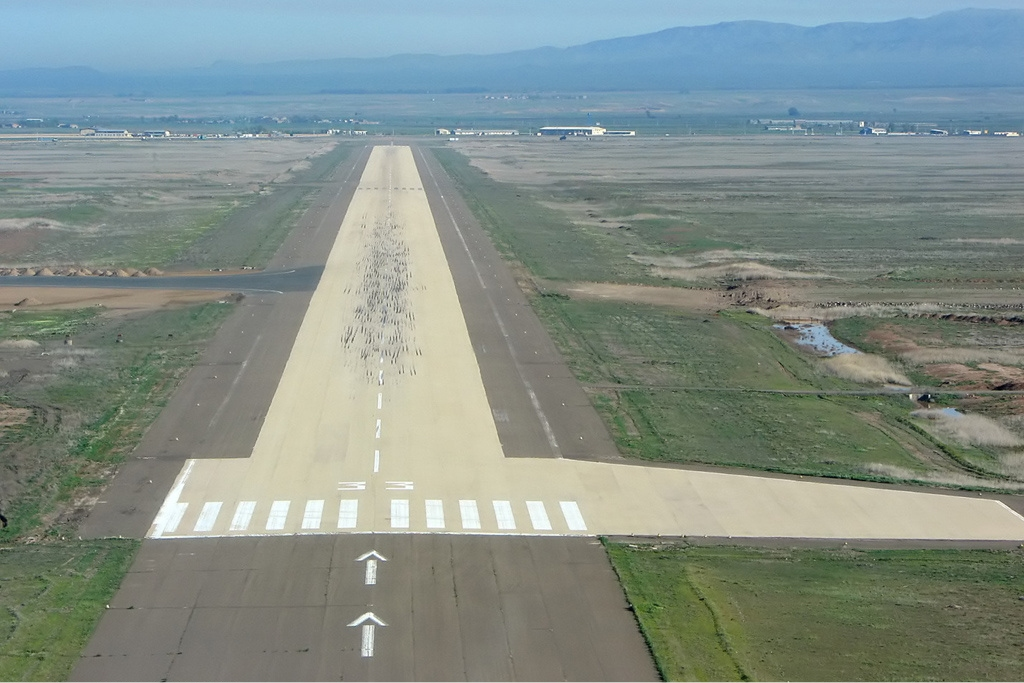
- IATA: ADU; ICAO: OITL

Summary
- Airport type: Public
- Owner: Government of Iran
- Operator: Iran Airports Company
- Serves: Ardabil
- Location: Ardabil, Iran
- Elevation AMSL: 4,315 ft (1,315 m)
- Coordinates: 38°19′32″N 48°25′27″E

Map
- Location of airport in Iran

Runways
Direction	Length		Surface
Direction	m	ft	Surface
15/33	3,298	10,820	Asphalt
07/25	2,500	8,202	Unknown

Statistics (۱۳۹۳ - 2014)
- Aircraft Movements: 1,632
- Passengers: 203,797
- Cargo: 1,534 tons ▲52.8%
- Source: Iranian Airports Holding Company

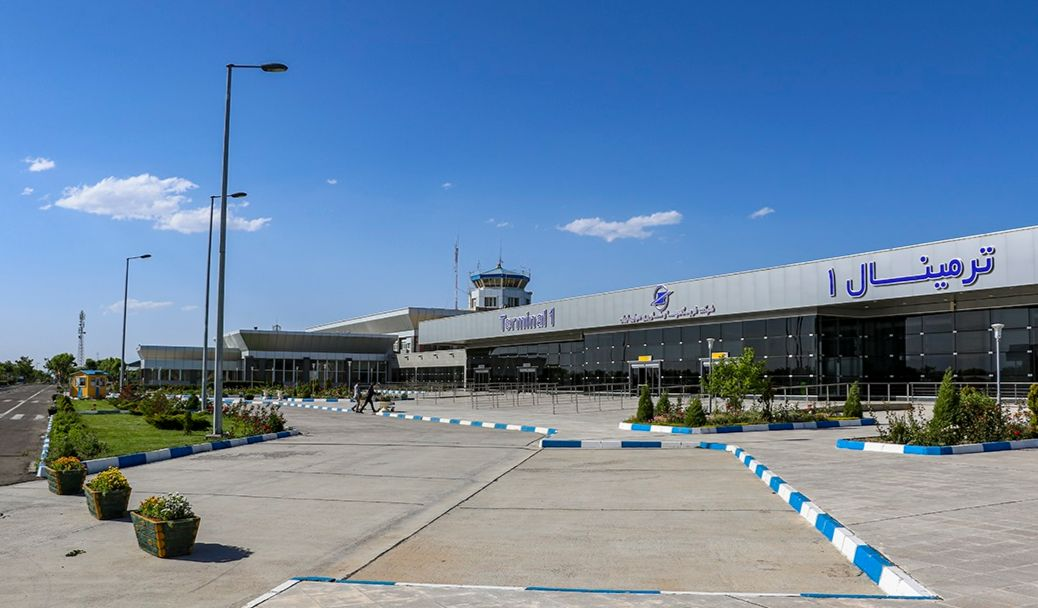
Ardabil Airport - 2021

Ardabil Airport (IATA: ADU, ICAO: OITL) is an airport north-east of Ardabil, in north-western Iran.

== History ==
On 2 July 2015, the Iranian Minister of Roads held a press conference after his recent visit at the Paris Air Show. He announced the installation of an ILS system at Ardabil Airport which will "decrease the flight cancellations by up to 50 percent".

== Airlines and destinations ==
Airlines	Destinations
ATA Airlines	Mashhad, Tehran–Mehrabad
Iran Air	Tehran–Mehrabad; Seasonal: Jeddah, Medina
Iran Aseman Airlines	Mashhad, Tehran–Mehrabad
Mahan Air	Mashhad, Tehran–Mehrabad
Pouya Air	Tehran–Mehrabad
Zagros Airlines	Tehran–Mehrabad; Seasonal: Najaf (suspended)
