= Dasht-e Naz Airport =

- IATA: SRY; ICAO: OINZ

Summary
- Airport type: Public
- Owner: Government of Iran
- Operator: Iran Airports Company
- Serves: Sari, Mazandaran, Iran
- Location: Miandorud-e Bozorg Rural District, Central District, Miandorud County
- Hub for: Varesh Airlines
- Elevation AMSL: 35 ft / 11 m
- Coordinates: 36°38′09″N 53°11′37″E
- Website: sari.airport.ir

Map
- Location of Dasht-e Naz Airport in Iran

Runways
Direction	Length		Surface
Direction	ft	m	Surface
16/34	8,688	2,648	Asphalt

Statistics (2017)
- Aircraft movements: 3,580 ▲3%
- Passengers: 407,802 ▲15%
- Cargo: 3,822 tons ▲16%
- Source: Iran Airports Company

Dasht-e Naz Airport (Persian: فرودگاه دشت ناز) (IATA: SRY, ICAO: OINZ) (Note: Romanized as Ferūdegāh-e Dasht-e Nāz; also known as Sari Dasht-e Naz Airport (فرودگاه دشت ناز ساری), romanized as Ferūdegāh-e Dasht-e Nāz-e Sari) is an airport serving the city of Sari in Mazandaran Province, Iran. It is located in Miandorud-e Bozorg Rural District of the Central District in Miandorud County, Mazandaran. It was established in 1947.

== Airlines and destinations ==
Airlines	Destinations
ATA Airlines	Mashhad
Caspian Airlines	Mashhad, Tehran–Mehrabad
Iran Air	Tehran–Mehrabad; Seasonal: Jeddah, Medina
Iran Aseman Airlines	Ahvaz, Isfahan, Mashhad, Shiraz, Tehran–Mehrabad
Kish Air	Kish, Mashhad
Qeshm Air	Asaluyeh
Saha Airlines	Asaluyeh
Taban Air	Mashhad
Varesh Airlines	Asaluyeh, Bandar Abbas, Chabahar/Konarak, Dubai–Al Maktoum, Isfahan, Kish, Mashhad, Qeshm, Shiraz, Tehran–Mehrabad

== Demographics ==
=== Population ===
At the time of the 2006 National Census, the village of Ferudegah-e Dasht-e Naz's population was 59 in 16 households, when it was in the former Miandorud District of Sari County. The following census in 2011 counted 65 people in 17 households, by which time the district had been separated from the county in the establishment of Miandorud County. The rural district was transferred to the new Central District. The 2016 census measured the population of the village as zero.
