= Shahid Sadooghi Airport =

Yazd Airport فرودگاه يزد
- IATA: AZD; ICAO: OIYY

Summary
- Airport type: Public
- Owner: Government of Iran
- Operator: Iran Airports Company
- Serves: Yazd
- Location: Yazd, Iran
- Hub for: Yazd Airways
- Elevation AMSL: 4,054 ft (1,236 m)
- Coordinates: 31°54′18″N 054°16′35″E
- Website: yazd.airport.ir

Map
- Location of airport in Iran

Runways
Direction	Length		Surface
Direction	m	ft	Surface
13/31	4,098	13,446	Asphalt

Statistics (2017)
- Aircraft Movements: 6,413 ▲5%
- Passengers: 764,074 ▲14%
- Cargo: 4,972 tonnes ▲15%
- Source: Iran Airports Company

Yazd Airport (Persian: فرودگاه یزد) (IATA: AZD, ICAO: OIYY) is an airport in Yazd, Iran. The airport lies 10 kilometers away from the city center of Yazd and serves the city as well as all of the surrounding counties. The Shahid Sadooghi Airport also serves as a part of the important north–south transportation corridor within the Islamic Republic of Iran. For administrative and census purposes, it is a treated as a abadi in Fajr Rural District, in the Central District of Yazd County, Yazd province, Iran. At the 2006 census, its population was 127, in 33 families.

The airport was established in 1970 upon 575 hectares of land. Even though the airport does not have an international status, there are occasional charter flights as well as scheduled passenger services to neighboring countries such as Iraq and Syria. Furthermore, the airport provides routine international service to Jeddah and Medina in Saudi Arabia for the annual Hajj season.

Despite operating at 40-50% capacity, a total of 431,500 passengers traveled through Shahid Sadooghi Airport in 2012, making it the eleventh busiest airport in Iran in terms of passenger traffic and number of flight operations.

== Airlines and destinations ==
Airlines	Destinations
Asa Jet	Tehran–Mehrabad
ATA Airlines	Kish, Mashhad, Tehran–Mehrabad
Caspian Airlines	Mashhad, Najaf (suspended), Tehran–Mehrabad
FlyPersia	Mashhad, Tehran–Mehrabad
Iran Air	Bandar Abbas, Tehran–Mehrabad; Seasonal: Jeddah, Medina
Iran Aseman Airlines	Mashhad, Tehran–Mehrabad
Karun Airlines	Ahvaz, Bandar Abbas, Tehran–Mehrabad
Kish Air	Kish, Mashhad, Tehran–Mehrabad
Mahan Air	Tehran–Mehrabad
Pars Air	Isfahan, Kish, Tabriz, Tehran–Mehrabad
Pouya Air	Mashhad, Tabriz, Tehran–Mehrabad
Raimon Airways	Mashhad
Saha Airlines	Mashhad, Tehran–Mehrabad
Sepehran Airlines	Mashhad, Tehran–Mehrabad
Taban Air	Mashhad
Varesh Airlines	Mashhad
Yazd Airways	Bandar Abbas, Kish, Mashhad, Najaf (suspended), Qeshm, Tehran–Mehrabad

== See also ==
- List of longest runways
