= Pouya Air =

Iranian cargo airline

IATA	ICAO	Call sign
PY	PYA	POUYA
- Founded: 2008; 18 years ago
- Operating bases: Tehran Mehrabad International Airport
- Fleet size: 8
- Destinations: 22
- Parent company: IRGC
- Headquarters: Mehrabad International Airport
- Key people: Mohammad Mohammadi
- Website: www.pouyaair.com

Pouya Air (Persian: هواپیمایی پویا, romanized: Havâpeymâyi-ye Puyâ), trading as Pouya, is an Iranian airline with its head office at Mehrabad International Airport in Tehran. It operates both passenger and cargo flights to domestic locations in Iran, as well as a few international destinations in West Asia.

== History ==
In late 2012, Yas Air changed its name to Pouya Air. The first name change was to Pars Air in 2006 and later to Yas Air in 2008. Pouya Air is identified today as an alias for designated Iranian airline Yas Air, which was designated in March 2012 pursuant to E.O. 13224 for acting for or on behalf of the IRGC-QF for transporting illicit cargo, including weapons, to Iran's clients in the Levant.

== Destinations ==
Pouya Air serves the following destinations (as of May 2023):

Country	City	Airport	Notes	Refs
Iran	Abu Musa	Abu Musa Airport		
Iran	Ardabil	Ardabil Airport		
Iran	Asaluyeh	Persian Gulf Airport		
Iran	Bandar Abbas	Bandar Abbas International Airport		
Iran	Bushehr	Bushehr Airport		
Iran	Chabahar	Chabahar Konarak Airport		
Iran	Gorgan	Gorgan Airport		
Iran	Greater Tunb	Greater Tunb Airport		
Iran	Isfahan	Shahid Beheshti International Airport		
Iran	Kish	Kish International Airport		
Iran	Lamerd	Lamerd International Airport		
Iran	Mashhad	Shahid Hasheminejad International Airport		
Iran	Qeshm	Qeshm International Airport		
Iran	Rasht	Rasht Airport		
Iran	Shiraz	Shahid Dastgheib International Airport		
Iran	Sirri Island	Sirri Island Airport		
Iran	Tabriz	Shahid Madani International Airport		
Iran	Tehran	Mehrabad International Airport	Hub	
Iran	Urmia	Shahid Bakeri International Airport		
Iran	Yazd	Shahid Sadooghi Airport		
Iraq	Najaf	Al Najaf International Airport		
Russia	Astrakhan	Narimanovo Airport	Seasonal	

== Fleet ==
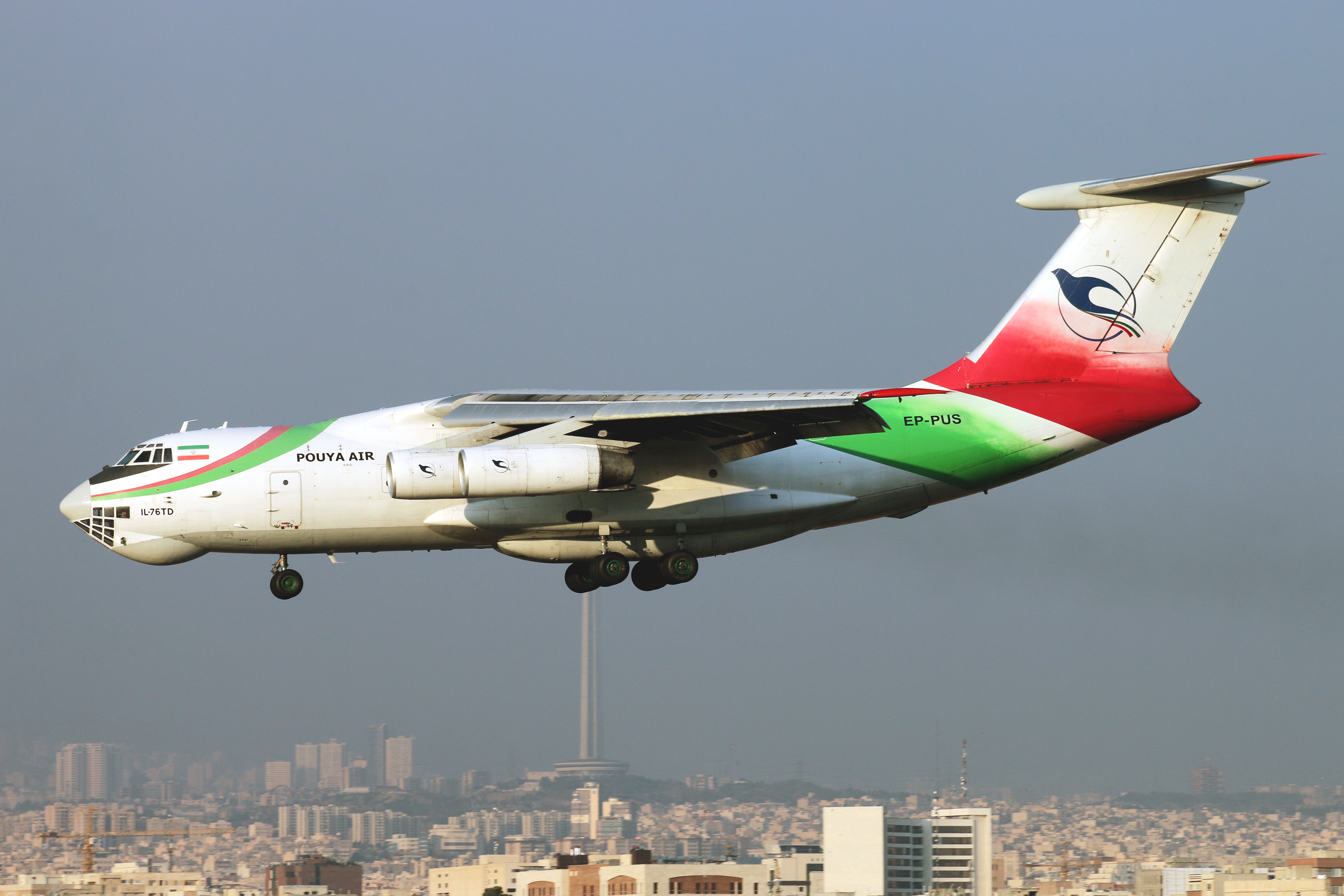
Pouya Air Ilyushin Il-76

=== Current fleet ===
As of April 2023 the Pouya Air fleet consists of the following aircraft:

Pouya Air fleet
Aircraft	In fleet	Notes
Embraer ERJ 145ER	4 (as of July 2026)	Passenger aircraft
Ilyushin Il-76	1 (as of July 2026)	Cargo aircraft
Bombardier Challenger 600	1	Business jet
Bombardier CRJ100/200	1	Business jet
Total	8	

=== Former fleet ===
As of August 2025 Pouya Air operated 1 further Ilyushin IL-76.

== See also ==
- List of airlines of Iran
- Iran Aviation Industries Organization
