= AVA Airlines =

Private Iranian airline

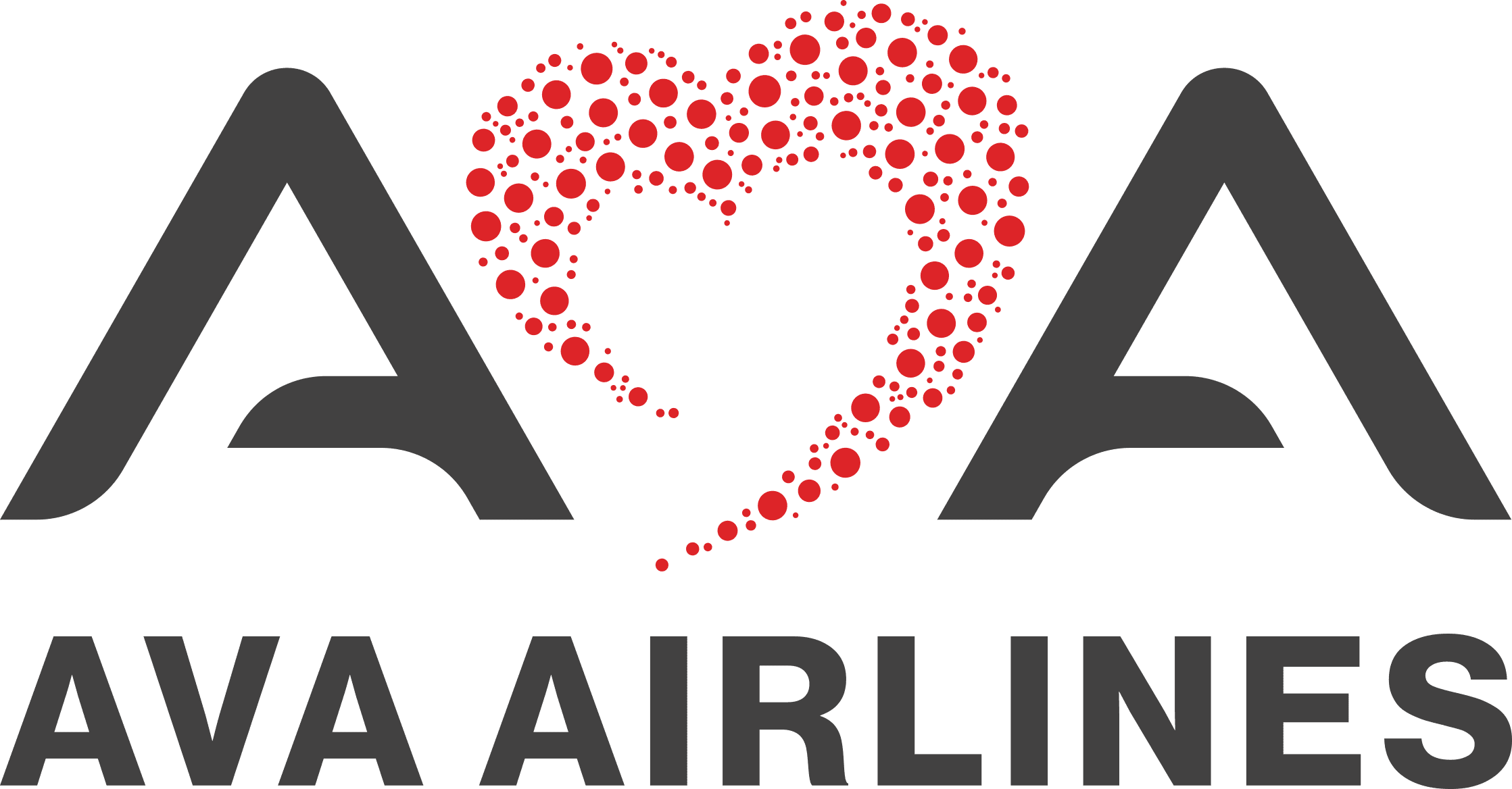

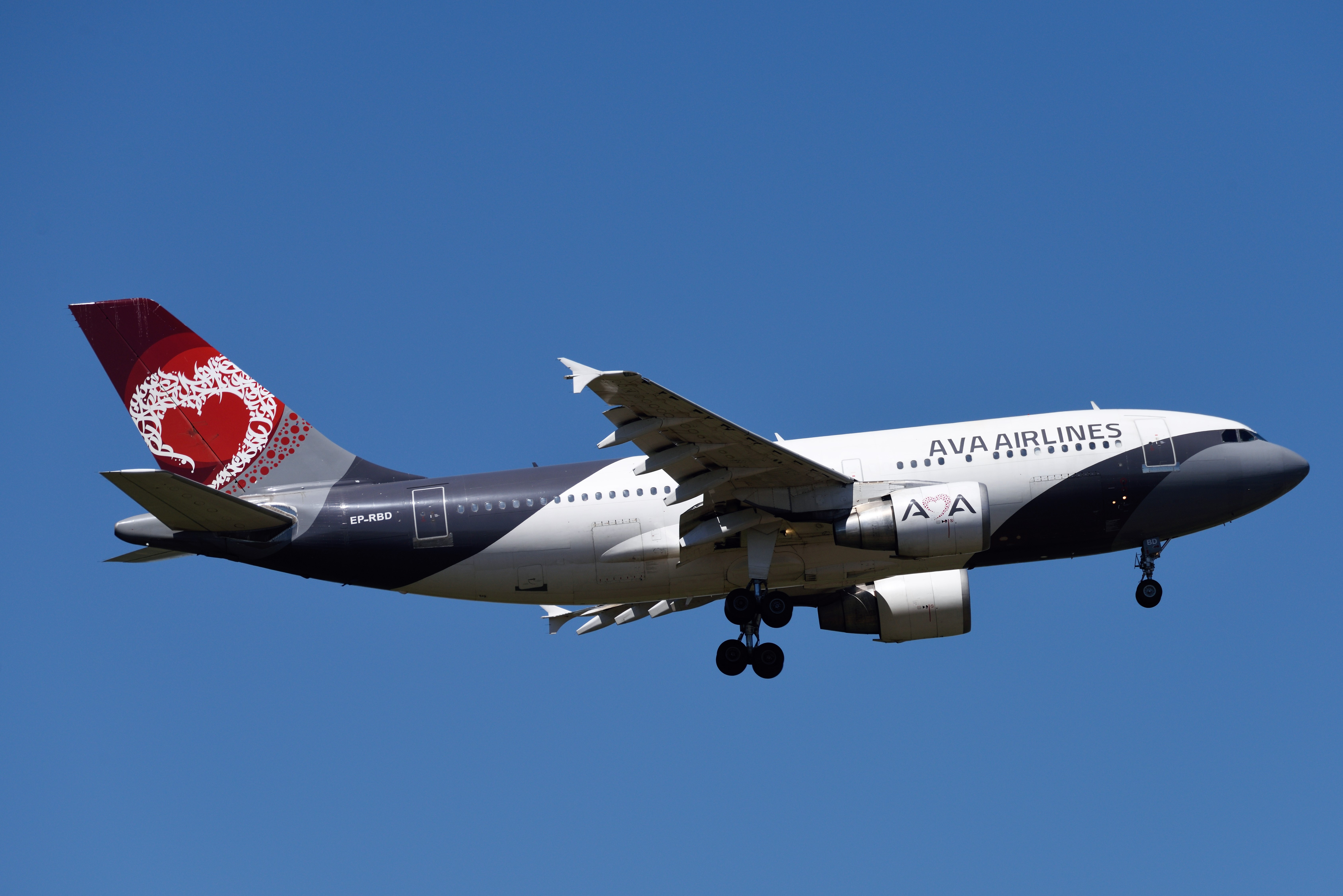
- AVA Airlines Airbus A310-300
IATA	ICAO	Call sign
-	AXV	AVA
- Commenced operations: 2024
- Hubs: Imam Khomeini International Airport
- Fleet size: 4
- Employees: 100–499
- Website: avaair.ir

AVA Airlines (Persian: هواپیمایی آوا, romanized: Havâpeymâyi-ye ÂVÂ) is an Iranian low-cost airline that operates out of its base in Imam Khomeini International Airport. Ava Airlines flights often depart out of terminal 2 at Mehrabad Airport.

In 2025, it had around 100 to 499 employees. AVA Airlines is best known for operating the Airbus A310, an older aircraft.

== History ==
It became operational in February 2024. Its first aircraft was a Boeing 737-500. AVA then expanded with an McDonnell Douglas MD-80 and Airbus A310. Its first flight was the Tehran-Bushehr route. During rising tensions between Iran and Israel AVA Airlines made a surprise decision to fly to Turkey, Istanbul in particular. AVA Airlines was one of the first airlines in Iran to resume service after the brief airspace closure.

In 2026 the Afghan flag carrier Ariana Afghan Airlines would sign an agreement to lease one of the AVA Airlines aircraft for one year. The purpose of the agreement was to help Ariana become more reliable.

== Fleet ==
=== Current fleet ===
As of July 2026, Ava Airlines operates the following aircraft:

Aircraft	In service	Orders	Passengers			Notes
Aircraft	In service	Orders	C	Y	Total	Notes
Airbus A310-300	1	1				
Boeing 737-500	4	—	—			
Total	5	1				

=== Former fleet ===
Plane	Number of	Notes
MD-80	1	
737-500	1	Stored

== Destinations ==
Country	City	Airport	Notes
Iran	Mashhad	Mashhad Shahid Hasheminejad International Airport	
Iran	Kermanshah	Kermanshah Airport	
Iran	Kish	Kish International Airport	
Iran	Tehran	Tehran Mehrabad Airport	Hub
Iran	Shiraz	Shiraz Shahid Dastgheib International airport Airport	
Iran	Avhaz	Qasem Soleimani International Airport	
Iran	Bandar Abbas	Bandar Abbas International Airport	
Iran	Isfahan	Isfahan Shahid Beheshti International Airport	
Iran	Yazd	Shahid Sadooghi Airport	
Iran	Qeshm (island)	Qeshm International Airport	
Iraq	Najaf	Al Najaf Airport	
Iraq	Baghdad	Baghdad International Airport	
Turkey	Istanbul	Istanbul Airport	
