= Civil Aviation Organization (Iran) =

Iranian government civil aviation safety agency

Civil Aviation Authority of Iran
- Abbreviation: CAA.IRI
- Formation: 1946
- Legal status: Statutory corporation
- Purpose: Aviation regulator
- Location: Mehrabad International Airport "Main Office"
- Region served: Iran
- Chief Executive: Abouzar Ghorban Shiroudi
- Parent organization: Ministry of Roads and Transportation of Iran
- Subsidiaries: Iranian Airports Holding Company
- Website: en.caa.gov.ir

The Civil Aviation Authority of Islamic Republic of Iran (CAA.IRI), (Persian: سازمان هواپیمایی کشوری جمهوری اسلامی ایران ) is Iran's civil aviation agency. It is the statutory corporation which oversees and regulates all aspects of civil aviation in Iran. This organization is primarily responsible for regulating aviation, overseeing flight safety, issuing licenses, and evaluating the performance of airlines and airports. The organization was established in July 1946 and its headquartered at Mehrabad International Airport in Tehran. It investigates aviation accidents and incidents in Iran.

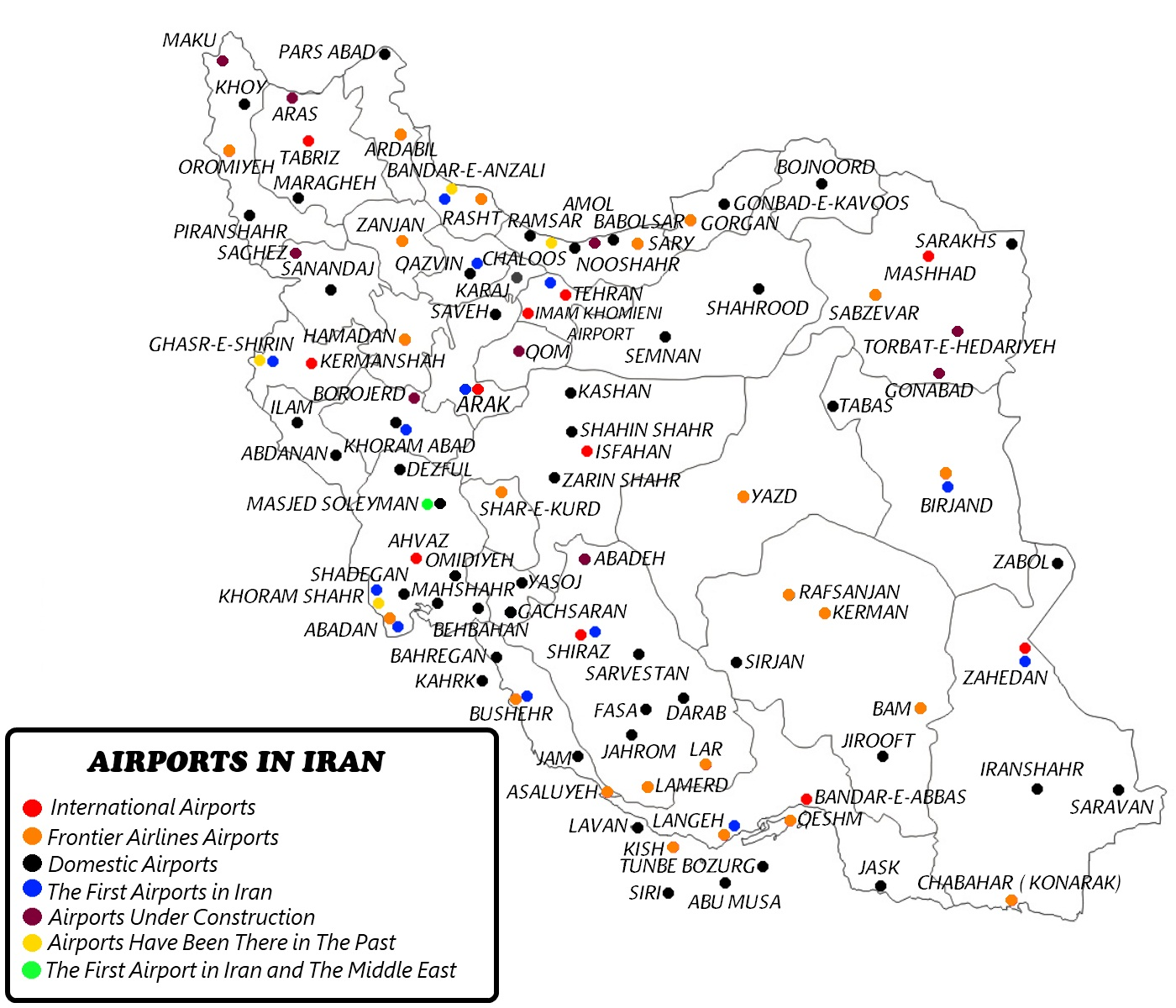
Airports in Iran

== Responsibilities ==
The CAA.IRI responsibilities are:

- Iran's skies Rules and Regulation
- Professional and private pilots
- Licensed aircraft engineers
- Air traffic controllers
- Airlines
- Licensed aerodromes
- Organisations involved in the design (DO), production (PO), continuing airworthiness management (CAMO) and maintenance (AMO) of aeronautical products
- Organisations involved in the training of pilot (ATO), air traffic controller and maintenance engineer (MTO)
- Aircraft registered in Iran
- Aero-Medical Centres (AeMC)

== Previous flight calibration service fleet ==
- Beechcraft F33C Bonanza: Flight Service, registration mark EP-BAO. Derelict at Arak Airport
- Dassault Falcon (Mystere) 20E: Flight Calibration Service, registration mark EP-FIC (since 09 Sep 1975). Crashed while performing navigational aide calibration at Kish International Airport on 3 March 2014.
- Dassault Falcon 2000EX: Flight Calibration Service, registration mark EP-FSC
- Rockwell 500S Shrike Commander: Registration mark EP-MAA, scrapped at Tehran-Ghaleh Morghi Airport in 2011.

== See also ==
- Iranian Airports Holding Company
- Islamic Republic of Iran Air Force
- List of airlines of Iran
- List of airports in Iran
- List of the busiest airports in Iran
- Ministry of Roads & Urban Development
