= Rasht Airport =

- IATA: RAS; ICAO: OIGG

Summary
- Airport type: Public/military
- Owner: Government of Iran
- Operator: Iran Airports Company; Islamic Republic of Iran Navy Aviation
- Serves: Rasht, Gilan
- Location: Rasht, Iran
- Elevation AMSL: −40 ft (−12 m)
- Coordinates: 37°19′31.13″N 49°36′20.94″E
- Website: rasht.airport.ir

Map
- Location of airport in Iran

Runways
Direction	Length		Surface
Direction	ft	m	Surface
09/27	9,571	2,917	Asphalt

Statistics (2017)
- Aircraft movements: 4,646 ▲21%
- Passengers: 446,576 ▲16%
- Cargo: 3,944 tons ▲13%
- Source: Iran Airports Company

Rasht Airport (IATA: RAS, ICAO: OIGG) (Persian: فرودگاه بین المللی رشت) is an international airport located 10 kilometers north of the city of Rasht, Gilan Province, in the north of Iran. It is also known as Sardar Jangal Airport. It has flight connections to different parts of Iran, and about 446,000 passengers passed through it in 2017.

== Airlines and destinations ==
Airlines	Destinations
Asa Jet	Qeshm,
Iran Air	Seasonal: Medina
Pouya Air	Seasonal: Astrakhan, Najaf
Raimon Airways	Shiraz, Tehran–Mehrabad
Tajik Air	Dushanbe International Airport

== See also ==
- Iran Civil Aviation Organization
- Transport in Iran
- List of airports in Iran
- List of the busiest airports in Iran
- List of airlines of Iran
