= Bushehr Airport =

Bushehr Airport فرودگاه بین المللی بوشهر
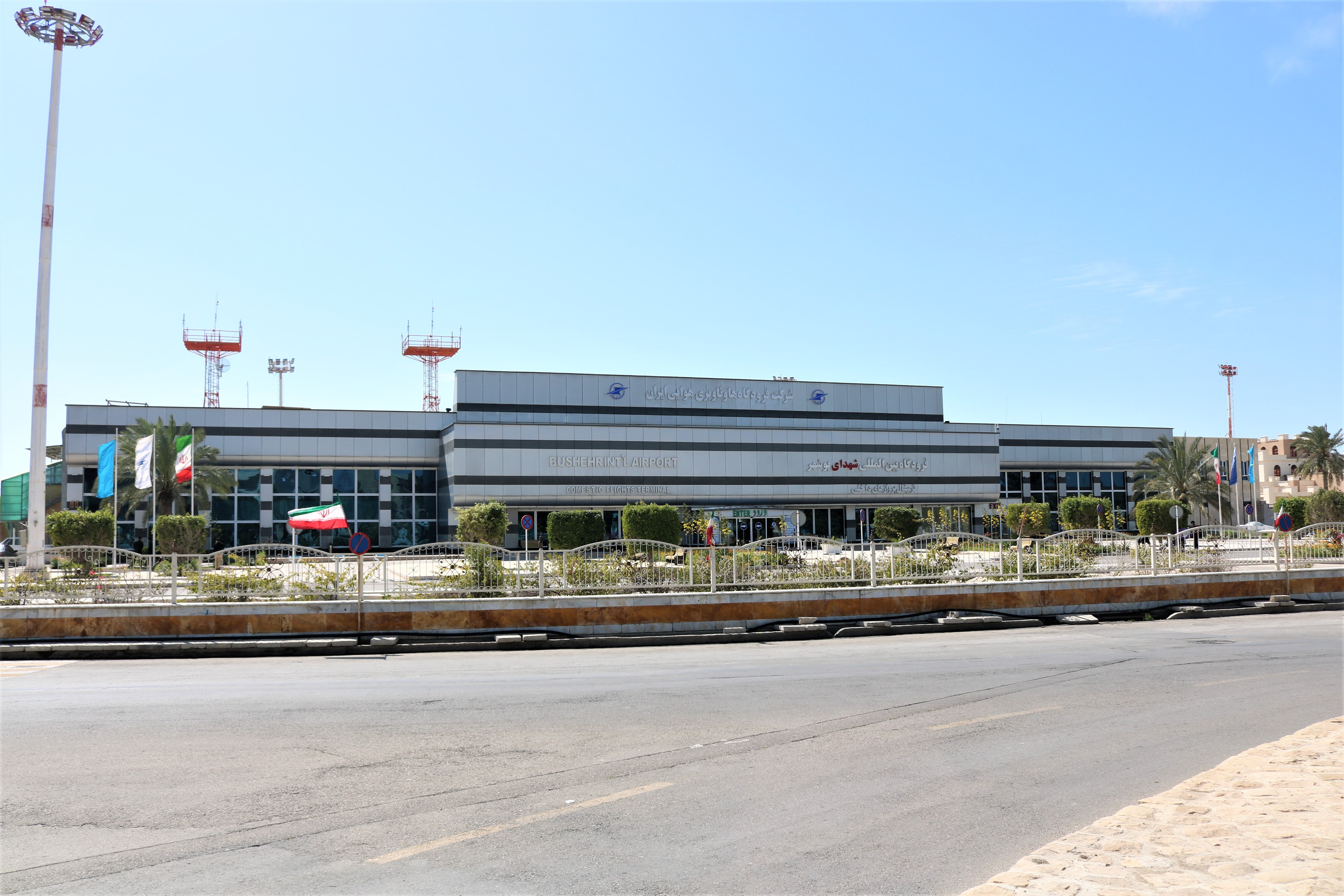
- IATA: BUZ; ICAO: OIBB

Summary
- Airport type: Public/military
- Owner: Government of Iran
- Operator: Iran Airports Company/Iran Air Force
- Serves: Bushehr
- Location: Bushehr, Iran
- Elevation AMSL: 68 ft (21 m)
- Coordinates: 28°56′41.32″N 050°50′04.69″E
- Website: booshehr.airport.ir/

Map
- Location of airport in Iran

Runways
Direction	Length		Surface
Direction	ft	m	Surface
13R/31L	14,664	4,470	Asphalt
13L/31R	14,663	4,469	Asphalt

Statistics (2015)
- Aircraft movements: 2,747
- Passengers: 324,204
- Cargo: 3,901 tons
- Source: Iranian Airports Holding Company

Bushehr Airport (IATA: BUZ, ICAO: OIBB) is a joint civil and military international airport in Bushehr, Iran.

== Airlines and destinations ==
Airlines	Destinations
ATA Airlines	Tehran–Mehrabad
flydubai	Dubai–International
Iran Air	Tehran–Mehrabad; Seasonal: Jeddah, Medina
Iran Airtour	Tehran–Mehrabad
Iran Aseman Airlines	Tehran–Mehrabad
Qeshm Air	Tehran–Mehrabad
Varesh Airlines	Tehran–Mehrabad

== Incidents and accidents ==
- On 3 March 2026, during the 2026 Iran war, an Iran Air Airbus A319 was destroyed by American and Israeli airstrikes.
- On 28 July 2026, Iranian government spokesperson Fatemeh Mohajerani stated that the airport had been rendered inoperable following U.S. airstrikes.

== See also ==
- Iran Civil Aviation Organization
- Transport in Iran
- List of airports in Iran
- List of the busiest airports in Iran
- List of airlines of Iran
