= Qarah Aghaj (disambiguation) =

Qarah Aghaj is a city in East Azerbaijan Province, Iran.

Qarah Aghaj, Qareh Aghaj, Qareh Aqaj, Qara Aqaj, Qarah Aqaj and similar (Persian: قره اغاج) may refer to:

== Ardabil Province ==
- Qarah Aghaj-e Bala, a village in Germi County
- Qarah Aghaj-e Pain, a village in Germi County
- Qarah Aghaj, Meshgin Shahr, a village in Meshgin Shahr County
- Qarah Aghaj Poshteh, a village in Meshgin Shahr County

== East Azerbaijan Province ==
- Qarah Aghaj-e Kushk, a village in Charuymaq County
- Qareh Aghaj Rud, a village in Hashtrud County
- Qarah Aghaj, East Azerbaijan, a village in Shabestar County
- Qarah Aghaj, a city in Charuymaq County.

== Fars Province ==
- Qarah Aqaj Sand Quarry, in Qir and Karzin County

== Golestan Province ==
- Qareh Aghaj, Golestan

== Hamadan Province ==
- Qarah Aghaj, Hamadan

== Isfahan Province ==
- Qarah Aqaj, Isfahan, a village in Semirom County

== North Khorasan Province ==
- Qarah Aqaj, North Khorasan

== Qazvin Province ==
- Qareh Aghaj, Qazvin

== Razavi Khorasan Province ==
- Qareh Aghaj, Razavi Khorasan

== West Azerbaijan Province ==
- Qarah Aghaj, Khoy, a village in Khoy County
- Qareh Aghaj, Maku, a village in Maku County
- Qarah Aghaj, Showt, a village in Showt County
- Qarah Aghaj, Urmia, a village in Urmia County
- Qareh Aghaj, Sumay-ye Beradust, a village in Urmia County
- Qarah Aghaj-e Olya, West Azerbaijan, a village in Urmia County

== Zanjan Province ==
- Qarah Aghaj, Abhar, Zanjan Province
- Qareh Aghaj, Zanjan, Zanjan Province
- Qarah Aghaj-e Olya, Zanjan
- Qarah Aghaj-e Sofla, Zanjan Province
- Qareh Aqajlu, Zanjan Province

== See also ==
- Karaağaç, alternate spelling of the phrase
