= Khalaj, Iran =

Khalaj (Persian: خلج), also rendered as Kalach, in Iran may refer to:

- Khalaj, Ardabil
- Khalaj, East Azerbaijan
- Khalaj, Hamadan
- Khalaj, Isfahan
- Khalaj, Razavi Khorasan
- Khalaj-e Malmir, Markazi Province
- Khalaj-e Olya, Markazi Province
- Khalaj-e Sofla
- Khalaj, West Azerbaijan
- Khalaj, Urmia, West Azerbaijan Province
- Khalaj-e Ajam, West Azerbaijan Province
- Khalaj-e Kord, West Azerbaijan Province
- Khalaj, Khorramdarreh, Zanjan Province
- Khalaj, Mahneshan, Zanjan Province
