= Ali Kandi =

Ali Kandi or Alikandi (Persian: علي كندي) may refer to:

- Ali Kandi, East Azerbaijan
- Ali Kandi, Hormozgan
- Ali Kandi, Showt, West Azerbaijan Province
- Ali Kandi, Qarah Quyun, Showt County, West Azerbaijan Province
- Ali Kandi, Urmia, West Azerbaijan Province
