= Margan =

Margan (Persian: مرگن or مارگان or مرگان) may refer to:

- Margan, Fars (مارگان - Mārgān)
- Margan, Sistan and Baluchestan (مارگان - Mārgān)
- Margan-e Azizabad (مرگن - Margan), West Azerbaijan Province
- Margan-e Esmail Kandi (مرگن - Margan), West Azerbaijan Province
- Margan-e Qadim (مرگن - Margan), West Azerbaijan Province
- Margan-e Vasat (مرگن - Margan), West Azerbaijan Province
- Margan (مرگن - Margan), alternate name of Maraghan, West Azerbaijan Province
- Margan Rural District (مارگان - Mārgān), in Sistan and Baluchestan Province
- Margan Top, a mountain pass in Kashmir Valley
