= Samad Yurdi =

Village in West Azerbaijan province, Iran

Samad Yurdi Persian: صمديوردي
- Village
- Location within Iran
- Coordinates: 38°58′02″N 44°49′34″E
- Country: Iran
- Province: West Azerbaijan
- County: Showt
- District: Qarah Quyun
- Rural District: Cheshmeh Sara

Population (2016)
  - Total: 168
- Time zone: UTC+3:30 (IRST)

Samad Yurdi (Persian: صمديوردي) (Note: Also romanized as Şamad Yūrdī) is a village in Cheshmeh Sara Rural District of Qarah Quyun District in Showt County, West Azerbaijan province, Iran.

== Demographics ==
=== Population ===
At the time of the 2006 National Census, the village's population was 236 in 54 households, when it was in Qarah Quyun-e Jonubi Rural District of the former Showt District in Maku County. The following census in 2011 counted 226 people in 51 households, by which time the district had been separated from the county in the establishment of Showt County. The rural district was transferred to the new Qarah Quyun District, and Samad Yurdi was transferred to Cheshmeh Sara Rural District created in the same district. The 2016 census measured the population of the village as 168 people in 52 households.
