= Kura Bolagh, Showt =

Village in West Azerbaijan province, Iran

Kura Bolagh Persian: كورابلاغ
- Village
- Location within Iran
- Coordinates: 38°57′50″N 44°49′00″E
- Country: Iran
- Province: West Azerbaijan
- County: Showt
- District: Qarah Quyun
- Rural District: Cheshmeh Sara

Population (2016)
  - Total: 208
- Time zone: UTC+3:30 (IRST)

Kura Bolagh (Persian: كورابلاغ) (Note: Also romanized as Kūrā Bolāgh and Kūrābolāgh) is a village in Cheshmeh Sara Rural District of Qarah Quyun District in Showt County, West Azerbaijan province, Iran.

== Demographics ==
=== Population ===
At the time of the 2006 National Census, the village's population was 408 in 92 households, when it was in Qarah Quyun-e Jonubi Rural District of the former Showt District in Maku County. The following census in 2011 counted 300 people in 73 households, by which time the district had been separated from the county in the establishment of Showt County. The rural district was transferred to the new Qarah Quyun District, and Kura Bolagh was transferred to Cheshmeh Sara Rural District created in the same district. The 2016 census measured the population of the village as 208 people in 65 households.
