= Shahr-e Silabi =

Village in West Azerbaijan province, Iran

Shahr-e Silabi Persian: شهر سيلابي
- Village
- Location within Iran
- Coordinates: 39°02′34″N 44°56′26″E
- Country: Iran
- Province: West Azerbaijan
- County: Showt
- District: Qarah Quyun
- Rural District: Cheshmeh Sara

Population (2016)
  - Total: 136
- Time zone: UTC+3:30 (IRST)

Shahr-e Silabi (Persian: شهر سيلابي) (Note: Also romanized as Shahr-e Sīlābī; formerly known as Shamusilabi (شموسيلابي), also romanized as Shamūsīlābī; also known as Shams ʿAlī Kandī (شمسعلي كندي) and Shamū Salāvī) is a village in Cheshmeh Sara Rural District of Qarah Quyun District in Showt County, West Azerbaijan province, Iran.

== Demographics ==
=== Population ===
At the time of the 2006 National Census, the village's population, as Shamusilabi, was 201 in 55 households, when it was in Qarah Quyun-e Jonubi Rural District of the former Showt District in Maku County. The following census in 2011 counted 148 people in 45 households, by which time the district had been separated from the county in the establishment of Showt County. The rural district was transferred to the new Qarah Quyun District, and the village was transferred to Cheshmeh Sara Rural District created in the same district and listed as Shahr-e Silabi. The 2016 census measured the population of the village as 136 people in 51 households.
