= Karaağaç =

Karaağaç ("elm", literally "dark tree"), also spelled Qaraağac or Karaagach or Qarağac, is a Turkic place name and may refer to:

== Places ==
=== Turkey ===
- Karaağaç, Adıyaman
- Karaağaç, Biga
- Karaağaç, Bilecik
- Karaağaç, Bozüyük
- Karaağaç, Çorum
- Karaağaç, Çubuk
- Karaağaç, Daday
- Karaağaç, Edirne
- Karaağaç, Emirdağ
- Karaağaç, Gölpazarı
- Karaağaç, Gömeç
- Karaağaç, Hatay
- Karaağaç, Hınıs
- Karaağaç, İpsala
- Karaağaç, İscehisar
- Karaağaç, İskilip
- Karaağaç, Koçarlı
- Karaağaç, Kumluca
- Karaağaç, Kızılcahamam
- Karaağaç, Kulp
- Karaağaç, Orta
- Karaağaç, Seben
- Karaağaç, Suluova
- Karaağaç, Tekirdağ
- Karaağaç, Şavşat
- Karaağaç railway station

=== Azerbaijan ===
- Qaraağac, Jalilabad
- Qaraağac, Jabrayil
- Qaraağac, Nakhchivan
- Qaraağac, Sabirabad
- Qarağac, Qubadli

=== Other ===
- Karaagach (river), a river in Bulgaria
- Karaağaç, former name of Levski, Pleven Province in Bulgaria
- Karaağaç, former name of Ptelea, Evros in Greece
- Karaagach, Iran, a village in East Azerbaijan Province, Iran
- Karaağaç, Turkish name of Charkeia in Cyprus

== See also ==
- Qarah Aghaj (disambiguation), places with the name in Iran
- Kayragach (disambiguation), placenames with the same etymology in Central Asia
