= Khezerlu, Showt =

Village in West Azerbaijan province, Iran

Khezerlu Persian: خضرلو
- Village
- Location within Iran
- Coordinates: 38°59′04″N 44°51′37″E
- Country: Iran
- Province: West Azerbaijan
- County: Showt
- District: Qarah Quyun
- Rural District: Cheshmeh Sara

Population (2016)
  - Total: 584
- Time zone: UTC+3:30 (IRST)

Khezerlu (Persian: خضرلو) (Note: Also romanized as Khezerloo and Khez̄erlū; also known as Khedarlū, Khezerlū-ye Bālā, and Kheẕerlū-ye Soflá) is a village in Cheshmeh Sara Rural District of Qarah Quyun District in Showt County, West Azerbaijan province, Iran.

== Demographics ==
=== Population ===
At the time of the 2006 National Census, the village's population was 761 in 176 households, when it was in Qarah Quyun-e Jonubi Rural District of the former Showt District in Maku County. The following census in 2011 counted 757 people in 184 households, by which time the district had been separated from the county in the establishment of Showt County. The rural district was transferred to the new Qarah Quyun District, and Khezerlu was transferred to Cheshmeh Sara Rural District created in the same district. The 2016 census measured the population of the village as 584 people in 189 households.
