= Sheykh Silu =

Village in West Azerbaijan province, Iran

Sheykh Silu Persian: شيخ سيلو
- Village
- Location within Iran
- Coordinates: 39°02′19″N 44°51′48″E
- Country: Iran
- Province: West Azerbaijan
- County: Showt
- District: Qarah Quyun
- Rural District: Cheshmeh Sara

Population (2016)
  - Total: 262
- Time zone: UTC+3:30 (IRST)

Sheykh Silu (Persian: شيخ سيلو) (Note: Also romanized as Sheykh Sīlū and Sheykhsīlū; formerly known as Sheykh Selu (شيخ سیلو), also romanized as Sheykh Selū) is a village in Cheshmeh Sara Rural District of Qarah Quyun District in Showt County, West Azerbaijan province, Iran.

== Demographics ==
=== Population ===
At the time of the 2006 National Census, the village's population, as Sheykh Selu, was 431 in 91 households, when it was in Qarah Quyun-e Jonubi Rural District of the former Showt District in Maku County. The following census in 2011 counted 351 people in 61 households, by which time the district had been separated from the county in the establishment of Showt County. The rural district was transferred to the new Qarah Quyun District, and the village was transferred to Cheshmeh Sara Rural District created in the same district and listed as Sheykh Silu. The 2016 census measured the population of the village as 262 people in 83 households.
