= Qaban Basan =

Village in West Azerbaijan province, Iran

Qaban Basan Persian: قابان باسان
- Village
- Location within Iran
- Coordinates: 39°16′39″N 44°51′24″E
- Country: Iran
- Province: West Azerbaijan
- County: Showt
- District: Central
- Rural District: Yowla Galdi

Population (2016)
  - Total: 399
- Time zone: UTC+3:30 (IRST)

Qaban Basan (Persian: قابان باسان) (Note: Also romanized as Qābān Bāsān; formerly known as Sharifabad (شريف اباد), also romanized as Sharīfābād; and Sharif Kandi, also romanized as Sharīf Kandī; also known as Fattāḩ) is a village in Yowla Galdi Rural District of the Central District in Showt County, West Azerbaijan province, Iran.

== Demographics ==
=== Population ===
At the time of the 2006 National Census, the village's population, as Sharifabad, was 382 in 94 households, when it was in the former Showt District of Maku County. The following census in 2011 counted 400 people in 97 households, by which time the district had been separated from the county in the establishment of Showt County. The rural district was transferred to the new Central District and the village was listed as Sharif Kandi. The 2016 census measured the population of the village as 399 people in 111 households, when it was listed as Qaban Basan.

== See also ==
- Sharif Kandi, West Azerbaijan
