= Ezzatabad =

Ezzatabad (Persian: عزت اباد or عزتاباد) may refer to various places in Iran:

- Ezzatabad, Chaharmahal and Bakhtiari
- Ezzatabad, Gilan
- Ezzatabad-e Sharm Dasht, Gilan Province
- Ezzatabad, Hormozgan
- Ezzatabad, Kerman
- Ezzatabad, Markazi
- Ezzatabad, Mazandaran
- Ezzatabad, Razavi Khorasan
- Ezzatabad, Khoy, West Azerbaijan Province
- Ezzatabad, Showt, West Azerbaijan Province
