= Pir Shah =

Village in West Azerbaijan province, Iran

Pir Shah Persian: پير شاه
- Village
- Location within Iran
- Coordinates: 39°02′31″N 44°52′28″E
- Country: Iran
- Province: West Azerbaijan
- County: Showt
- District: Qarah Quyun
- Rural District: Cheshmeh Sara

Population (2016)
  - Total: 227
- Time zone: UTC+3:30 (IRST)

Pir Shah (Persian: پير شاه) (Note: Also romanized as Pīr Shāh; formerly known as Nurabad (نوراباد), also romanized as Nūrābād; also known as Pīrāsheh) is a village in Cheshmeh Sara Rural District of Qarah Quyun District in Showt County, West Azerbaijan province, Iran.

== Demographics ==
=== Population ===
At the time of the 2006 National Census, the village's population, as Nurabad, was 285 in 71 households, when it was in Qarah Quyun-e Jonubi Rural District of the former Showt District in Maku County. The following census in 2011 counted 301 people in 80 households, by which time the district had been separated from the county in the establishment of Showt County. The rural district was transferred to the new Qarah Quyun District, and Nurabad was transferred to Cheshmeh Sara Rural District created in the same district. The 2016 census measured the population of the village as 227 people in 68 households, when it was listed as Pir Shah.
