= Aghbolagh-e Mokhur =

Village in West Azerbaijan province, Iran

Aghbolagh-e Mokhur Persian: اغبلاغ مخور
- Village
- Location within Iran
- Coordinates: 38°59′44″N 44°49′47″E
- Country: Iran
- Province: West Azerbaijan
- County: Showt
- District: Qarah Quyun
- Rural District: Cheshmeh Sara

Population (2016)
  - Total: 72
- Time zone: UTC+3:30 (IRST)

Aghbolagh-e Mokhur (Persian: اغبلاغ مخور) (Note: Also romanized as Āghbolāgh-e Mokhūr; also known as Āqbolāgh) is a village in Cheshmeh Sara Rural District of Qarah Quyun District in Showt County, West Azerbaijan province, Iran.

== Demographics ==
=== Population ===
At the time of the 2006 National Census, the village's population was 125 in 25 households, when it was in Qarah Quyun-e Jonubi Rural District of the former Showt District in Maku County. The following census in 2011 counted 95 people in 26 households, by which time the district had been separated from the county in the establishment of Showt County. The rural district was transferred to the new Qarah Quyun District, and Aghbolagh-e Mokhur was transferred to Cheshmeh Sara Rural District created in the same district. The 2016 census measured the population of the village as 72 people in 24 households.
