= Il Bolaghi =

Village in West Azerbaijan province, Iran

Il Bolaghi Persian: ايل بلاغي
- Village
- Location within Iran
- Coordinates: 39°01′29″N 44°58′38″E
- Country: Iran
- Province: West Azerbaijan
- County: Showt
- District: Qarah Quyun
- Rural District: Cheshmeh Sara

Population (2016)
  - Total: 399
- Time zone: UTC+3:30 (IRST)

Il Bolaghi (Persian: ايل بلاغي) (Note: Also romanized as Īl Bolāghī and Īlbolāghī; also known as Shāh Bolāghī (شاه بلاغي)) is a village in Cheshmeh Sara Rural District of Qarah Quyun District in Showt County, West Azerbaijan province, Iran.

== Demographics ==
=== Population ===
At the time of the 2006 National Census, the village's population was 503 in 124 households, when it was in Qarah Quyun-e Jonubi Rural District of the former Showt District in Maku County. The following census in 2011 counted 508 people in 145 households, by which time the district had been separated from the county in the establishment of Showt County. The rural district was transferred to the new Qarah Quyun District, and Il Bolaghi was transferred to Cheshmeh Sara Rural District created in the same district. The 2016 census measured the population of the village as 399 people in 123 households.
