= Hasan Kandi, Showt =

Village in West Azerbaijan province, Iran

Hasan Kandi Persian: حسن كندي
- Village
- Location within Iran
- Coordinates: 38°58′52″N 44°53′22″E
- Country: Iran
- Province: West Azerbaijan
- County: Showt
- District: Qarah Quyun
- Rural District: Cheshmeh Sara

Population (2016)
  - Total: Below reporting threshold
- Time zone: UTC+3:30 (IRST)

Hasan Kandi (Persian: حسن كندي) (Note: Also romanized as Ḩasan Kandī; also known as Ḩasan Kandī-ye Seyyed Lor) is a village in Cheshmeh Sara Rural District of Qarah Quyun District in Showt County, West Azerbaijan province, Iran.

== Demographics ==
=== Population ===
At the time of the 2006 National Census, the village's population was 19 in seven households, when it was in Qarah Quyun-e Jonubi Rural District of the former Showt District in Maku County. The following census in 2011 counted 32 people in nine households, by which time the district had been separated from the county in the establishment of Showt County. The rural district was transferred to the new Qarah Quyun District, and Hasan Kandi was transferred to Cheshmeh Sara Rural District created in the same district. The 2016 census measured the population of the village as below the reporting threshold.
