= Kesharkhi =

Village in West Azerbaijan province, Iran

Kesharkhi Persian: كش ارخي
- Village
- Location within Iran
- Coordinates: 39°14′49″N 44°44′23″E
- Country: Iran
- Province: West Azerbaijan
- County: Showt
- District: Central
- Rural District: Yowla Galdi

Population (2016)
  - Total: 900
- Time zone: UTC+3:30 (IRST)

Kesharkhi (Persian: كش ارخي) (Note: Also romanized as Kesharkhī; also known as Keshākhī) is a village in Yowla Galdi Rural District of the Central District in Showt County, West Azerbaijan province, Iran.

== Demographics ==
=== Population ===
At the time of the 2006 National Census, the village's population was 754 in 172 households, when it was in the former Showt District of Maku County. The following census in 2011 counted 850 people in 181 households, by which time the district had been separated from the county in the establishment of Showt County. The rural district was transferred to the new Central District. The 2016 census measured the population of the village as 900 people in 226 households.
