= Bash Kahriz =

Village in West Azerbaijan province, Iran

Bash Kahriz Persian: باش كهريز
- Village
- Location within Iran
- Coordinates: 39°03′52″N 44°53′55″E
- Country: Iran
- Province: West Azerbaijan
- County: Showt
- District: Qarah Quyun
- Rural District: Qarah Quyun-e Jonubi

Population (2016)
  - Total: 769
- Time zone: UTC+3:30 (IRST)

Bash Kahriz (Persian: باش كهريز) (Note: Also romanized as Bāsh Kahrīz) is a village in Qarah Quyun-e Jonubi Rural District of Qarah Quyun District in Showt County, West Azerbaijan province, Iran.

== Demographics ==
=== Population ===
At the time of the 2006 National Census, the village's population was 764 in 170 households, when it was in the former Showt District of Maku County. The following census in 2011 counted 861 people in 235 households, by which time the district had been separated from the county in the establishment of Showt County. The rural district was transferred to the new Qarah Quyun District. The 2016 census measured the population of the village as 769 people in 225 households.
