= Dizaj-e Tavil =

Village in West Azerbaijan province, Iran

Dizaj-e Tavil Persian: ديزج طويل
- Village
- Location within Iran
- Coordinates: 39°19′38″N 44°47′59″E
- Country: Iran
- Province: West Azerbaijan
- County: Showt
- District: Central
- Rural District: Yowla Galdi

Population (2016)
  - Total: 375
- Time zone: UTC+3:30 (IRST)

Dizaj-e Tavil (Persian: ديزج طويل) (Note: Also romanized as Dīzaj-e Ţavīl; also known as Dīzaj) is a village in Yowla Galdi Rural District of the Central District in Showt County, West Azerbaijan province, Iran.

== Demographics ==
=== Population ===
At the time of the 2006 National Census, the village's population was 410 in 89 households, when it was in the former Showt District of Maku County. The following census in 2011 counted 332 people in 86 households, by which time the district had been separated from the county in the establishment of Showt County. The rural district was transferred to the new Central District. The 2016 census measured the population of the village as 335 people in 89 households.
