= Ahmadabad, Showt =

Village in West Azerbaijan province, Iran

Ahmadabad Persian: احمد آباد
- Village
- Location within Iran
- Coordinates: 39°15′16″N 44°44′24″E
- Country: Iran
- Province: West Azerbaijan
- County: Showt
- District: Central
- Rural District: Yowla Galdi

Population (2016)
  - Total: 376
- Time zone: UTC+3:30 (IRST)

Ahmadabad (Persian: احمد آباد) (Note: Also romanized as Aḩmadābād; formerly known as Geday (گداي), also romanized as Gedāy) is a village in Yowla Galdi Rural District of the Central District in Showt County, West Azerbaijan province, Iran.

== Demographics ==
=== Population ===
At the time of the 2006 National Census, the village's population, as Geday, was 365 in 101 households, when it was in the former Showt District of Maku County. The following census in 2011 counted 366 people in 104 households, by which time the district had been separated from the county in the establishment of Showt County. The rural district was transferred to the new Central District and the village was listed as Ahmadabad. The 2016 census measured the population of the village as 376 people in 114 households.
