= Soleyman Kandi, West Azerbaijan =

Village in West Azerbaijan province, Iran

Soleyman Kandi Persian: سليمان كندي
- Village
- Location within Iran
- Coordinates: 39°06′06″N 44°49′51″E
- Country: Iran
- Province: West Azerbaijan
- County: Showt
- District: Central
- Rural District: Qarah Quyun-e Shomali

Population (2016)
  - Total: 294
- Time zone: UTC+3:30 (IRST)

Soleyman Kandi (Persian: سليمان كندي) (Note: Also romanized as Soleymān Kandī; also known as Qezeljeh Qal‘eh (قزلجه قلعه)) is a village in Qarah Quyun-e Shomali Rural District of the Central District in Showt County, West Azerbaijan province, Iran.

== Demographics ==
=== Population ===
At the time of the 2006 National Census, the village's population was 542 in 111 households, when it was in the former Showt District of Maku County. The following census in 2011 counted 381 people in 106 households, by which time the district had been separated from the county in the establishment of Showt County. The rural district was transferred to the new Central District. The 2016 census measured the population of the village as 294 people in 95 households.
