= Baboor =

Baboor may refer to:

== Places ==
- Babur, Iran (disambiguation), various places
  - Babur-e Ajam, Iran
  - Babur-e Kord, Iran

== People ==
- Chetan Baboor (born 1974), Indian table tennis champion
