= Duz Aghol =

Village in West Azerbaijan province, Iran

Duz Aghol Persian: دوزاغل
- Village
- Location within Iran
- Coordinates: 39°04′18″N 44°56′27″E
- Country: Iran
- Province: West Azerbaijan
- County: Showt
- District: Qarah Quyun
- Rural District: Qarah Quyun-e Jonubi

Population (2016)
  - Total: 173
- Time zone: UTC+3:30 (IRST)

Duz Aghol (Persian: دوزاغل) (Note: Also romanized as Dūz Āghel and Dūz Āghol; also known as Dooz Aghlī, Dūz Āghlī, and Duzagal) is a village in Qarah Quyun-e Jonubi Rural District of Qarah Quyun District in Showt County, West Azerbaijan province, Iran.

== Demographics ==
=== Population ===
At the time of the 2006 National Census, the village's population was 213 in 56 households, when it was in the former Showt District of Maku County. The following census in 2011 counted 180 people in 53 households, by which time the district had been separated from the county in the establishment of Showt County. The rural district was transferred to the new Qarah Quyun District. The 2016 census measured the population of the village as 173 people in 57 households.
