= Arpaliq =

Arpaliq ارپاليق
- Village
- Location within Iran
- Coordinates: 39°04′54″N 44°46′23″E
- Country: Iran
- Province: West Azerbaijan
- County: Showt
- Bakhsh: Central
- Rural District: Qarah Quyun-e Shomali

Population (2006)
  - Total: 103
- Time zone: UTC+3:30 (IRST)
  - Summer (DST): UTC+4:30 (IRDT)

Arpaliq (Persian: ارپاليق, also Romanized as Ārpālīq; also known as Ārpālīkh) is a village in Qarah Quyun-e Shomali Rural District, in the Central District of Showt County, West Azerbaijan Province, Iran. At the 2006 census, its population was 103, across 22 families.
