= Teymurabad, West Azerbaijan =

Village in West Azerbaijan province, Iran

Teymurabad Persian: تيموراباد
- Village
- Location within Iran
- Coordinates: 39°11′44″N 44°46′26″E
- Country: Iran
- Province: West Azerbaijan
- County: Showt
- District: Central
- Rural District: Qarah Quyun-e Shomali

Population (2016)
  - Total: 291
- Time zone: UTC+3:30 (IRST)

Teymurabad (Persian: تيموراباد) (Note: Also romanized as Teymūrābād) is a village in Qarah Quyun-e Shomali Rural District of the Central District in Showt County, West Azerbaijan province, Iran.

== Demographics ==
=== Population ===
At the time of the 2006 National Census, the village's population was 302 in 72 households, when it was in the former Showt District of Maku County. The following census in 2011 counted 327 people in 88 households, by which time the district had been separated from the county in the establishment of Showt County. The rural district was transferred to the new Central District. The 2016 census measured the population of the village as 291 people in 82 households.
