= Azim Kandi =

Village in West Azerbaijan province, Iran

Azim Kandi Persian: عظيم كندي
- Village
- Location within Iran
- Coordinates: 39°16′10″N 44°46′16″E
- Country: Iran
- Province: West Azerbaijan
- County: Showt
- District: Central
- Rural District: Yowla Galdi

Population (2016)
  - Total: 476
- Time zone: UTC+3:30 (IRST)

Azim Kandi (Persian: عظيم كندي) (Note: Also romanized as ‘Az̧īm Kandī) is a village in, and the capital of, Yowla Galdi Rural District in the Central District of Showt County, West Azerbaijan province, Iran. The previous capital of the rural district was the village of Yowla Galdi, now a city.

== Demographics ==
=== Population ===
At the time of the 2006 National Census, the village's population was 440 in 109 households, when it was in the former Showt District of Maku County. The following census in 2011 counted 446 people in 117 households, by which time the district had been separated from the county in the establishment of Showt County. The rural district was transferred to the new Central District. The 2016 census measured the population of the village as 476 people in 132 households. It was the most populous village in its rural district.
