= Seniq =

Village in West Azerbaijan province, Iran

Seniq Persian: سنيق
- Village
- Location within Iran
- Coordinates: 39°12′27″N 44°52′26″E
- Country: Iran
- Province: West Azerbaijan
- County: Showt
- District: Central
- Rural District: Qarah Quyun-e Shomali

Population (2016)
  - Total: 157
- Time zone: UTC+3:30 (IRST)

Seniq (Persian: سنيق) (Note: Also romanized as Senīq; formerly known as Seneq (سنق)) is a village in Qarah Quyun-e Shomali Rural District of the Central District in Showt County, West Azerbaijan province, Iran.

== Demographics ==
=== Population ===
At the time of the 2006 National Census, the village's population, as Seneq, was 259 in 58 households, when it was in the former Showt District of Maku County. The following census in 2011 counted 265 people in 74 households, by which time the district had been separated from the county in the establishment of Showt County. The rural district was transferred to the new Central District and the village was listed as Seniq. The 2016 census measured the population of the village as 157 people in 53 households.
