= Qarah Quyun =

Qarah Quyun (Persian: قره قويون) may refer to:

- Qarah Quyun District
- Qarah Quyun-e Jonubi Rural District
- Qarah Quyun-e Shomali Rural District
