= Sufi, West Azerbaijan =

Village in West Azerbaijan province, Iran

Sufi Persian: صوفي
- Village
- Location within Iran
- Coordinates: 39°08′12″N 44°50′17″E
- Country: Iran
- Province: West Azerbaijan
- County: Showt
- District: Central
- Rural District: Qarah Quyun-e Shomali

Population (2016)
  - Total: 2,605
- Time zone: UTC+3:30 (IRST)

Sufi (Persian: صوفي) (Note: Also romanized as Soofi, Şowfī, and Şūfī) is a village in, and the capital of, Qarah Quyun-e Shomali Rural District in the Central District of Showt County, West Azerbaijan province, Iran.

== Demographics ==
=== Population ===
At the time of the 2006 National Census, the village's population was 2,523 in 572 households, when it was in the former Showt District of Maku County. The following census in 2011 counted 2,507 people in 697 households, by which time the district had been separated from the county in the establishment of Showt County. The rural district was transferred to the new Central District. The 2016 census measured the population of the village as 2,605 people in 774 households. It was the most populous village in its rural district.
