= Bayram Kandi =

Bayram Kandi (Persian: بايرام كندي) may refer to:

- Bayram Kandi, Charuymaq, East Azerbaijan Province
- Bayram Kandi, Malekan, East Azerbaijan Province
- Bayram Kandi, Khoy, West Azerbaijan Province
- Bayram Kandi, Showt, West Azerbaijan Province
