= Kandal, West Azerbaijan =

Village in West Azerbaijan province, Iran

Kandal Persian: كندال
- Village
- Location within Iran
- Coordinates: 39°10′09″N 44°46′15″E
- Country: Iran
- Province: West Azerbaijan
- County: Showt
- District: Central
- Rural District: Qarah Quyun-e Shomali

Population (2016)
  - Total: 262
- Time zone: UTC+3:30 (IRST)

Kandal (Persian: كندال) (Note: Also romanized as Kandāl; also known as Ja”farābād and Kandil) is a village in Qarah Quyun-e Shomali Rural District of the Central District in Showt County, West Azerbaijan province, Iran.

== Demographics ==
=== Population ===
At the time of the 2006 National Census, the village's population was 441 in 102 households, when it was in the former Showt District of Maku County. The following census in 2011 counted 402 people in 95 households, by which time the district had been separated from the county in the establishment of Showt County. The rural district was transferred to the new Central District. The 2016 census measured the population of the village as 262 people in 72 households.
