= Qarah Zamin =

Village in West Azerbaijan province, Iran

Qarah Zamin Persian: قره زمين
- Village
- Location within Iran
- Coordinates: 39°10′42″N 44°50′36″E
- Country: Iran
- Province: West Azerbaijan
- County: Showt
- District: Central
- Rural District: Qarah Quyun-e Shomali

Population (2016)
  - Total: 394
- Time zone: UTC+3:30 (IRST)

Qarah Zamin (Persian: قره زمين) (Note: Also romanized as Qarah Zamīn) is a village in Qarah Quyun-e Shomali Rural District of the Central District in Showt County, West Azerbaijan province, Iran.

== Demographics ==
=== Population ===
At the time of the 2006 National Census, the village's population was 602 in 130 households, when it was in the former Showt District of Maku County. The following census in 2011 counted 569 people in 147 households, by which time the district had been separated from the county in the establishment of Showt County. The rural district was transferred to the new Central District. The 2016 census measured the population of the village as 394 people in 111 households.
