= Ishkeh Su =

Village in West Azerbaijan province, Iran

Ishkeh Su Persian: اشکه سو
- Village
- Location within Iran
- Coordinates: 38°58′39″N 44°50′22″E
- Country: Iran
- Province: West Azerbaijan
- County: Showt
- District: Qarah Quyun
- Rural District: Cheshmeh Sara

Population (2016)
  - Total: 87
- Time zone: UTC+3:30 (IRST)

Ishkeh Su (Persian: اشکه سو) (Note: Also romanized as Īshkeh Sū; formerly known as Ishgeh Su (ايشگه سو), also romanized as Īshgeh Sū) is a village in Cheshmeh Sara Rural District of Qarah Quyun District in Showt County, West Azerbaijan province, Iran.

== Demographics ==
=== Population ===
At the time of the 2006 National Census, the village's population, as Ishgeh Su, was 94 in 19 households, when it was in Qarah Quyun-e Jonubi Rural District of the former Showt District in Maku County. The following census in 2011 counted 89 people in 22 households, by which time the district had been separated from the county in the establishment of Showt County. The rural district was transferred to the new Qarah Quyun District, and Ishgeh Su was transferred to Cheshmeh Sara Rural District created in the same district. The 2016 census measured the population of the village as 87 people in 26 households, when the village was listed as Ishkeh Su.
