= Qarah Ayaq =

Village in West Azerbaijan province, Iran

Qarah Ayaq Persian: قره اياق
- Village
- Location within Iran
- Coordinates: 39°17′17″N 44°49′57″E
- Country: Iran
- Province: West Azerbaijan
- County: Showt
- District: Central
- Rural District: Yowla Galdi

Population (2016)
  - Total: 2,389
- Time zone: UTC+3:30 (IRST)

Qarah Ayaq (Persian: قره اياق) (Note: Also romanized as Qarah Āyāq and Qarah Ayāq) is a village in Yowla Galdi Rural District of the Central District in Showt County, West Azerbaijan province, Iran.

== Demographics ==
=== Population ===
At the time of the 2006 National Census, the village's population was 1,617 in 343 households, when it was in the former Showt District of Maku County. The following census in 2011 counted 1,962 people in 454 households, by which time the district had been separated from the county in the establishment of Showt County. The rural district was transferred to the new Central District. The 2016 census measured the population of the village as 2,389 people in 556 households.
