= Mokhur, Showt =

Village in West Azerbaijan province, Iran

Mokhur Persian: مخور
- Village
- Location within Iran
- Coordinates: 39°00′24″N 44°47′47″E
- Country: Iran
- Province: West Azerbaijan
- County: Showt
- District: Qarah Quyun
- Rural District: Cheshmeh Sara

Population (2016)
  - Total: 2,321
- Time zone: UTC+3:30 (IRST)

Mokhur (Persian: مخور) (Note: Also romanized as Makhūr, Mokhūr, and Mokhvor; also known as Makhor, Mokhūr-e Qareh Qūyūn, Mūkhor, Mukhur, Mukhuri, and Mūkhvor) is a village in, and the capital of, Cheshmeh Sara Rural District in Qarah Quyun District of Showt County, West Azerbaijan province, Iran.

== Demographics ==
=== Population ===
At the time of the 2006 National Census, the village's population was 2,603 in 524 households, when it was in Qarah Quyun-e Jonubi Rural District of the former Showt District in Maku County. The following census in 2011 counted 2,325 people in 608 households, by which time the district had been separated from the county in the establishment of Showt County. The rural district was transferred to the new Qarah Quyun District, and Mokhur was transferred to Cheshmeh Sara Rural District created in the same district. The 2016 census measured the population of the village as 2,321 people in 606 households. It was the most populous village in its rural district.
