= Mohammad Karim Kandi =

Village in West Azerbaijan province, Iran

Mohammad Karim Kandi Persian: محمدكريم كندي
- Village
- Location within Iran
- Coordinates: 39°06′19″N 44°51′49″E
- Country: Iran
- Province: West Azerbaijan
- County: Showt
- District: Central
- Rural District: Qarah Quyun-e Shomali

Population (2016)
  - Total: 175
- Time zone: UTC+3:30 (IRST)

Mohammad Karim Kandi (Persian: محمدكريم كندي) (Note: Also romanized as Moḩammad Karīm Kandī) is a village in Qarah Quyun-e Shomali Rural District of the Central District in Showt County, West Azerbaijan province, Iran.

== Demographics ==
=== Population ===
At the time of the 2006 National Census, the village's population was 239 in 46 households, when it was in the former Showt District of Maku County. The following census in 2011 counted 225 people in 68 households, by which time the district had been separated from the county in the establishment of Showt County. The rural district was transferred to the new Central District. The 2016 census measured the population of the village as 175 people in 52 households.
