= Tazeh Kand-e Qadim, West Azerbaijan =

Village in West Azerbaijan province, Iran

Tazeh Kand-e Qadim Persian: تازه كند قديم
- Village
- Location within Iran
- Coordinates: 39°06′17″N 44°54′20″E
- Country: Iran
- Province: West Azerbaijan
- County: Showt
- District: Qarah Quyun
- Rural District: Qarah Quyun-e Jonubi

Population (2016)
  - Total: 2,087
- Time zone: UTC+3:30 (IRST)

Tazeh Kand-e Qadim (Persian: تازه كند قديم) (Note: Also romanized as Tāzeh Kand-e Qadīm; formerly known as Tazeh Kand (تازه كند), also romanized as Tāzeh Kand and Tāzehkand; also known as Mollā Qolī and Tāzeh Kand-e Qarah Qūyūn (تازه كندقره قويون)) is a village in Qarah Quyun-e Jonubi Rural District of Qarah Quyun District in Showt County, West Azerbaijan province, Iran.

== Demographics ==
=== Population ===
At the time of the 2006 National Census, the village's population was 1,902 in 494 households, when it was in the former Showt District of Maku County. The following census in 2011 counted 1,910 people in 577 households, by which time the district had been separated from the county in the establishment of Showt County. The rural district was transferred to the new Qarah Quyun District. The 2016 census measured the population of the village as 2,087 people in 649 households. It was the most populous village in its rural district.
