= Dash Feshal =

Dash Feshal داش فشل
- Village
- Location within Iran
- Coordinates: 39°08′31″N 44°41′11″E
- Country: Iran
- Province: West Azerbaijan
- County: Showt
- Bakhsh: Central
- Rural District: Qarah Quyun-e Shomali

Population (2006)
  - Total: 93
- Time zone: UTC+3:30 (IRST)
  - Summer (DST): UTC+4:30 (IRDT)

Dash Feshal (Persian: داش فشل, also Romanized as Dāsh Feshal and Dāsh Feshel; also known as Dāsh Fīshal, Fashal Dash, Feshal, Feshal Dāsh, and Mīshah) is a village in Qarah Quyun-e Shomali Rural District, in the Central District of Showt County, West Azerbaijan Province, Iran. At the 2006 census, its population was 93, in 26 families.
