= Khuk =

Khuk خوك
- Village
- Location within Iran
- Coordinates: 39°15′19″N 44°48′05″E
- Country: Iran
- Province: West Azerbaijan
- County: Showt
- Bakhsh: Central
- Rural District: Yowla Galdi

Population (2007)
  - Total: 309
- Time zone: UTC+3:30 (IRST)
  - Summer (DST): UTC+4:30 (IRDT)

Khuk (Persian: خوك, also Romanized as Khūk and Khowk; also known as Qeyām Kandī and Qīām Kandī) is a village in Yowla Galdi Rural District, in the Central District of Showt County, West Azerbaijan Province, Iran. At the 2006 census, its population was 309, in 82 families.
