= Margan-e Vasat =

Neighborhood in West Azerbaijan province, Iran

Margan-e Vasat Persian: مرگن وسط
- Neighborhood
- Location within Iran
- Coordinates: 39°08′30″N 44°56′55″E
- Country: Iran
- Province: West Azerbaijan
- County: Showt
- District: Qarah Quyun
- City: Marganlar

Population (2006)
  - Total: 564
- Time zone: UTC+3:30 (IRST)

Margan-e Vasat (Persian: مرگن وسط) (Note: Also romanized as Margan-e Vasaţ) is a neighborhood in the city of Marganlar in Qarah Quyun District of Showt County, West Azerbaijan province, Iran.

== Demographics ==
=== Population ===
At the time of the 2006 National Census, Margan-e Vasat's population was 564 in 130 households, when it was a village in Qarah Quyun-e Jonubi Rural District of the former Showt District in Maku County.

In 2007, the district was separated from the county in the establishment of Showt County and the rural district was transferred to the new Qarah Quyun District. At the same time, the villages of Margan-e Azizabad, Margan-e Esmail Kandi, Margan-e Qadim, and Margan-e Vasat were merged to form the new city of Marganlar in the same district.
