= Incheh-ye Qadim =

Village in West Azerbaijan province, Iran

Incheh-ye Qadim Persian: اينچه قديم
- Village
- Location within Iran
- Coordinates: 39°04′32″N 44°52′15″E
- Country: Iran
- Province: West Azerbaijan
- County: Showt
- District: Qarah Quyun
- Rural District: Qarah Quyun-e Jonubi

Population (2016)
  - Total: 293
- Time zone: UTC+3:30 (IRST)

Incheh-ye Qadim (Persian: اينچه قديم) (Note: Also romanized as Īncheh-ye Qadīm; also known as Īncheh-ye Kohneh (اينچه كهنه)) is a village in Qarah Quyun-e Jonubi Rural District of Qarah Quyun District in Showt County, West Azerbaijan province, Iran.

== Demographics ==
=== Population ===
At the time of the 2006 National Census, the village's population was 459 in 93 households, when it was in the former Showt District of Maku County. The following census in 2011 counted 322 people in 79 households, by which time the district had been separated from the county in the establishment of Showt County. The rural district was transferred to the new Qarah Quyun District. The 2016 census measured the population of the village as 293 people in 89 households.
