= Qarah Kahriz, Showt =

Qarah Kahriz قره كهريز
- Village
- Location within Iran
- Coordinates: 39°09′05″N 44°48′08″E
- Country: Iran
- Province: West Azerbaijan
- County: Showt
- Bakhsh: Central
- Rural District: Qarah Quyun-e Shomali

Population (2006)
  - Total: 13
- Time zone: UTC+3:30 (IRST)
  - Summer (DST): UTC+4:30 (IRDT)

Qarah Kahriz (Persian: قره كهريز, also Romanized as Qarah Kahrīz) is a village in Qarah Quyun-e Shomali Rural District, in the Central District of Showt County, West Azerbaijan Province, Iran. At the 2006 census, its population was 13, in 6 families.
