= Kara Agach =

Kara Agach (Persian: کرا اغاچ) may refer to:

- Kara Agach, Maku
- Kara Agach, Showt
