= Ali Kandi, Cheshmeh Sara =

Village in West Azerbaijan province, Iran

Ali Kandi Persian: علي كندي
- Village
- Location within Iran
- Coordinates: 39°01′04″N 44°57′04″E
- Country: Iran
- Province: West Azerbaijan
- County: Showt
- District: Qarah Quyun
- Rural District: Cheshmeh Sara

Population (2016)
  - Total: 166
- Time zone: UTC+3:30 (IRST)

Ali Kandi (Persian: علي كندي) (Note: Also romanized as ʿAlī Kandī; also known as Maḩmūd Kandī (محمود كندي)) is a village in Cheshmeh Sara Rural District of Qarah Quyun District in Showt County, West Azerbaijan province, Iran.

== Demographics ==
=== Population ===
At the time of the 2006 National Census, the village's population was 198 in 48 households, when it was in Qarah Quyun-e Jonubi Rural District of the former Showt District in Maku County. The following census in 2011 counted 195 people in 59 households, by which time the district had been separated from the county in the establishment of Showt County. The rural district was transferred to the new Qarah Quyun District, and Ali Kandi was transferred to Cheshmeh Sara Rural District created in the same district. The 2016 census measured the population of the village as 166 people in 59 households.
