= Khalaj-e Kord =

Village in West Azerbaijan province, Iran

Khalaj-e Kord Persian: خلج چرد
- Village
- Location within Iran
- Coordinates: 39°16′22″N 44°43′57″E
- Country: Iran
- Province: West Azerbaijan
- County: Showt
- District: Central
- Rural District: Yowla Galdi

Population (2016)
  - Total: 770
- Time zone: UTC+3:30 (IRST)

Khalaj-e Kord (Persian: خلج كرد) is a village in Yowla Galdi Rural District of the Central District in Showt County, West Azerbaijan province, Iran.

== Demographics ==
=== Population ===
At the time of the 2006 National Census, the village's population was 691 in 133 households, when it was in the former Showt District of Maku County. The following census in 2011 counted 709 people in 167 households, by which time the district had been separated from the county in the establishment of Showt County. The rural district was transferred to the new Central District. The 2016 census measured the population of the village as 770 people in 205 households.
