= Mukhur =

Mukhur may refer to:

- Yujiulü Mugulü, former of the Rouran Khaganate, also known as Mukhur.
- Mokhor, Showt, a village in Qarah Quyun-e Jonubi Rural District
