= Bayancholi-ye Ajam =

Village in West Azerbaijan province, Iran

Bayancholi-ye Ajam Persian: بيانچلي عجم
- Village
- Location within Iran
- Coordinates: 39°14′06″N 44°48′58″E
- Country: Iran
- Province: West Azerbaijan
- County: Showt
- District: Central
- Rural District: Yowla Galdi

Population (2016)
  - Total: 666
- Time zone: UTC+3:30 (IRST)

Bayancholi-ye Ajam (Persian: بيانچلي عجم) (Note: Also romanized as Bayāncholī-ye ‘Ajam; also known as Bayān Chowlī and Bayāncholī-ye Pā’īn) is a village in Yowla Galdi Rural District of the Central District in Showt County, West Azerbaijan province, Iran.

== Demographics ==
=== Population ===
At the time of the 2006 National Census, the village's population was 644 in 148 households, when it was in the former Showt District of Maku County. The following census in 2011 counted 724 people in 170 households, by which time the district had been separated from the county in the establishment of Showt County. The rural district was transferred to the new Central District. The 2016 census measured the population of the village as 666 people in 169 households.
