= Qiasi =

Village in West Azerbaijan province, Iran

Qiasi Persian: قياسي
- Village
- Location within Iran
- Coordinates: 39°07′09″N 45°01′57″E
- Country: Iran
- Province: West Azerbaijan
- County: Showt
- District: Qarah Quyun
- Rural District: Qarah Quyun-e Jonubi

Population (2016)
  - Total: 279
- Time zone: UTC+3:30 (IRST)

Qiasi (Persian: قياسي) (Note: Also romanized as Qīāsī; also known as Ghiyas, Kiās, Qayās, Qeyās Bālā, Qīās, and Qīās-e Bālā) is a village in Qarah Quyun-e Jonubi Rural District of Qarah Quyun District in Showt County, West Azerbaijan province, Iran.

== Demographics ==
=== Population ===
At the time of the 2006 National Census, the village's population was 256 in 47 households, when it was in the former Showt District of Maku County. The following census in 2011 counted 257 people in 65 households, by which time the district had been separated from the county in the establishment of Showt County. The rural district was transferred to the new Qarah Quyun District. The 2016 census measured the population of the village as 279 people in 71 households.
