= Kord Kandi, Showt =

Kord Kandi كردكندي
- Village
- Location within Iran
- Coordinates: 39°16′34″N 44°51′52″E
- Country: Iran
- Province: West Azerbaijan
- County: Showt
- Bakhsh: Central
- Rural District: Yowla Galdi

Population (2006)
  - Total: 257
- Time zone: UTC+3:30 (IRST)
  - Summer (DST): UTC+4:30 (IRDT)

Kord Kandi (Persian: كردكندي, also Romanized as Kord Kandī; also known as Ḩoseyn ‘Alī Kandī-ye Kord and Ḩoseyn‘alī-ye Kandī Kord) is a village in Yowla Galdi Rural District, in the Central District of Showt County, West Azerbaijan Province, Iran. At the 2006 census, its population was 257, in 51 families.
