= Kuchaluy =

Kuchaluy (Persian: كوچلوي), also known as Kachu, may refer to:

- Kuchaluy-e Olya
- Kuchaluy-e Sofla
