= Hoseyn Ali Kandi-ye Ajam =

Hoseyn Ali Kandi-ye Ajam حسين علي كندي عجم
- Village
- Location within Iran
- Coordinates: 39°16′37″N 44°53′35″E
- Country: Iran
- Province: West Azerbaijan
- County: Showt
- Bakhsh: Central
- Rural District: Yowla Galdi

Population (2006)
  - Total: 153
- Time zone: UTC+3:30 (IRST)
  - Summer (DST): UTC+4:30 (IRDT)

Hoseyn Ali Kandi-ye Ajam (Persian: حسين علي كندي عجم, also Romanized as Ḩoseyn ‘Alī Kandī-ye ‘Ajam and Ḩoseyn‘alī-ye Kandī ‘Ajam; also known as Ḩoseyn‘alī Kandī) is a village in Yowla Galdi Rural District, in the Central District of Showt County, West Azerbaijan Province, Iran. At the 2006 census, its population was 153, in 37 families.
