= Qurd ol Daran-e Kord =

Village in West Azerbaijan province, Iran

Qurd ol Daran-e Kord Persian: قوردالدرن كرد
- Village
- Location within Iran
- Coordinates: 39°16′27″N 44°55′32″E
- Country: Iran
- Province: West Azerbaijan
- County: Showt
- District: Central
- Rural District: Yowla Galdi

Population (2016)
  - Total: 305
- Time zone: UTC+3:30 (IRST)

Qurd ol Daran-e Kord (Persian: قوردالدرن كرد) (Note: Also romanized as Qūrd ol Daran-e Kord; also known as Kūrt Kandī (كورت كندي), Qūrd ol Dūran, and Qurd ol Duran-e Kord (قوردالدرن كرد), also romanized as Qūrd ol Dūran-e Kord) is a village in Yowla Galdi Rural District of the Central District in Showt County, West Azerbaijan province, Iran.

== Demographics ==
=== Population ===
At the time of the 2006 National Census, the village's population was 265 in 47 households, when it was in the former Showt District of Maku County. The following census in 2011 counted 290 people in 56 households, by which time the district had been separated from the county in the establishment of Showt County. The rural district was transferred to the new Central District. The 2016 census measured the population of the village as 305 people in 76 households.
