= Ishgeh Su =

Ishgeh Su (Persian: ايشگه سو) may refer to:

- Ishgeh Su, Showt
- Ishgeh Su, Urmia
