= Kuchaluy-e Sofla =

Village in West Azerbaijan province, Iran

Kuchaluy-e Sofla Persian: كوچلوي سفلي
- Village
- Location within Iran
- Coordinates: 39°02′27″N 44°55′03″E
- Country: Iran
- Province: West Azerbaijan
- County: Showt
- District: Qarah Quyun
- Rural District: Cheshmeh Sara

Population (2016)
  - Total: 29
- Time zone: UTC+3:30 (IRST)

Kuchaluy-e Sofla (Persian: كوچلوي سفلي) (Note: Also romanized as Kūchalūy-e Soflá; also known as Kachū-ye Pā'īn and Kachū-ye Soflá) is a village in Cheshmeh Sara Rural District of Qarah Quyun District in Showt County, West Azerbaijan province, Iran.

== Demographics ==
=== Population ===
At the time of the 2006 National Census, the village's population was 95 in 22 households, when it was in Qarah Quyun-e Jonubi Rural District of the former Showt District in Maku County. The following census in 2011 counted 78 people in 21 households, by which time the district had been separated from the county in the establishment of Showt County. The rural district was transferred to the new Qarah Quyun District, and Kachaluy-e Sofla was transferred to Cheshmeh Sara Rural District created in the same district. The 2016 census measured the population of the village as 29 people in 11 households.
