= Bayancholi-ye Kord =

Bayancholi-ye Kord بيانچلي كرد
- Village
- Location within Iran
- Coordinates: 39°14′12″N 44°48′58″E
- Country: Iran
- Province: West Azerbaijan
- County: Showt
- Bakhsh: Central
- Rural District: Qarah Quyun-e Shomali

Population (2006)
  - Total: 33
- Time zone: UTC+3:30 (IRST)
  - Summer (DST): UTC+4:30 (IRDT)

Bayancholi-ye Kord (Persian: بيانچلي كرد, also Romanized as Bayāncholī-ye Kord) is a village in Qarah Quyun-e Shomali Rural District, in the Central District of Showt County, West Azerbaijan Province, Iran. At the 2006 census, its population was 33, in 7 families.
