= Kachu =

Kachu or Kachow (Persian: كچو) may refer to the following places:

- Kachumesqal, a village in Ardestan County, Isfahan province
- Kachu Rural District, in Isfahan province, Iran
- Kachu-ye Bala, West Azerbaijan province, Iran
- Kachu-ye Pain, West Azerbaijan province, Iran
- Kachu Pukur, Census Town in West Bengal, India
- Kachua, Village in West Bengal, India

== See also ==
- Kaju (disambiguation)
