= Qurd ol Duran =

Qurd ol Duran (Persian: قوردالدرن) may refer to:

- Qurd ol Duran-e Ajam
- Qurd ol Duran-e Kord
