= Qurd ol Duran-e Ajam =

Qurd ol Duran-e Ajam قوردالدرن عجم
- Village
- Location within Iran
- Coordinates: 39°16′28″N 44°55′32″E
- Country: Iran
- Province: West Azerbaijan
- County: Showt
- Bakhsh: Central
- Rural District: Yowla Galdi

Population (2006)
  - Total: 150
- Time zone: UTC+3:30 (IRST)
  - Summer (DST): UTC+4:30 (IRDT)

Qurd ol Duran-e Ajam (Persian: قوردالدرن عجم, also Romanized as Qūrd ol Dūran-e ʿAjam; also known as Qūrd ol Dūran) is a village in Yowla Galdi Rural District, in the Central District of Showt County, West Azerbaijan Province, Iran. At the 2006 census, its population was 150, in 33 families.
