= Bayram Kandi, Showt =

Bayram Kandi بايرام كندي
- Village
- Location within Iran
- Coordinates: 39°07′02″N 44°42′28″E
- Country: Iran
- Province: West Azerbaijan
- County: Showt
- Bakhsh: Central
- Rural District: Qarah Quyun-e Shomali

Population (2006)
  - Total: 51
- Time zone: UTC+3:30 (IRST)
  - Summer (DST): UTC+4:30 (IRDT)

Bayram Kandi (Persian: بايرام كندي, also Romanized as Bāyrām Kandī) is a village in Qarah Quyun-e Shomali Rural District, in the Central District of Showt County, West Azerbaijan Province, Iran. At the 2006 census, its population was 51, in 13 families.
