= Ezzatabad, Showt =

Ezzatabad عزتاباد
- Village
- Location within Iran
- Coordinates: 39°11′30″N 44°44′18″E
- Country: Iran
- Province: West Azerbaijan
- County: Showt
- Bakhsh: Central
- Rural District: Qarah Quyun-e Shomali

Population (2006)
  - Total: 97
- Time zone: UTC+3:30 (IRST)
  - Summer (DST): UTC+4:30 (IRDT)

Ezzatabad (Persian: عزتاباد, also Romanized as ‘Ezzatābād) is a village in Qarah Quyun-e Shomali Rural District, in the Central District of Showt County, West Azerbaijan Province, Iran. At the 2006 census, its population was 97, in 21 families.
