= Bayancholi =

Bayancholi (Persian: بيانچلي), also rendered as Bayan Chowli, may refer to:

- Bayancholi-ye Ajam
- Bayancholi-ye Kord
