= Sharif Kandi, West Azerbaijan =

Village in West Azerbaijan province, Iran

Sharif Kandi Persian: شريف كندي
- Village
- Location within Iran
- Coordinates: 39°05′47″N 44°50′54″E
- Country: Iran
- Province: West Azerbaijan
- County: Showt
- District: Central
- Rural District: Qarah Quyun-e Shomali

Population (2016)
  - Total: 174
- Time zone: UTC+3:30 (IRST)

Sharif Kandi (Persian: شريف كندي) (Note: Also romanized as Sharīf Kandī; also known as Qezeljā Qālāy-ye ‘Olyā) is a village in Qarah Quyun-e Shomali Rural District of the Central District in Showt County, West Azerbaijan province, Iran.

== Demographics ==
=== Population ===
At the time of the 2006 National Census, the village's population was 299 in 53 households, when it was in the former Showt District of Maku County. The following census in 2011 counted 261 people in 68 households, by which time the district had been separated from the county in the establishment of Showt County. The rural district was transferred to the new Central District. The 2016 census measured the population of the village as 174 people in 63 households.
