= Khalaj =

Khalaj may refer to:

- Khalaj language, Turkic language spoken in Iran
- Khalaj people, speakers of the language
- Khalji dynasty, a dynasty which ruled the Delhi Sultanate between 1290 and 1320
- Khalaj, Afghanistan, in Helmand Province
- Khalaj, Armenia
- Khalaj, Iran (disambiguation)
- Xələc, Nakhchivan (Khaladj, Khalaj)
- Halaç District, district in Turkmenistan

== See also ==
- Khalji (disambiguation)
