= Kaju =

Kaju (Persian: كاجو, also rendered as Kahju or Kachu), may refer to:

- Kaju, Sistan and Baluchestan, a village in Iran
- Kaju-ye Pain, South Khorasan Province

Kaju (Hindi, 'cashew nuts') is used in dish names such as:

- Kaju katli
- Kaju barfi

== See also ==
- Kachu (disambiguation)
- Khaju Bridge, in Isfahan, Iran.
