= Khalaj-e Ajam =

Village in West Azerbaijan province, Iran

Khalaj-e Ajam Persian: خلج عجم
- Village
- Location within Iran
- Coordinates: 39°16′54″N 44°43′29″E
- Country: Iran
- Province: West Azerbaijan
- County: Showt
- District: Central
- Rural District: Yowla Galdi

Population (2016)
  - Total: 368
- Time zone: UTC+3:30 (IRST)

Khalaj-e Ajam (Persian: خلج عجم) (Note: Also romanized as Khalaj-e ‘Ajam; also known as Khalaj Kord-e ‘Ajam) is a village in Yowla Galdi Rural District of the Central District in Showt County, West Azerbaijan province, Iran.

== Demographics ==
=== Population ===
At the time of the 2006 National Census, the village's population was 360 in 92 households, when it was in the former Showt District of Maku County. The following census in 2011 counted 289 people in 89 households, by which time the district had been separated from the county in the establishment of Showt County. The rural district was transferred to the new Central District. The 2016 census measured the population of the village as 368 people in 120 households.
