= Hoseyn Ali Kandi =

Hoseyn Ali Kandi or Hoseynali Kandi (Persian: حسين علي كندي) may refer to:

- Hoseyn Ali Kandi-ye Ajam
- Hoseyn Ali Kandi-ye Kord
