= Molla Ahmad, West Azerbaijan =

Molla Ahmad ملااحمد
- Village
- Location within Iran
- Coordinates: 39°15′11″N 44°46′53″E
- Country: Iran
- Province: West Azerbaijan
- County: Showt
- Bakhsh: Central
- Rural District: Yowla Galdi

Population (2006)
  - Total: 225
- Time zone: UTC+3:30 (IRST)
  - Summer (DST): UTC+4:30 (IRDT)

Molla Ahmad (Persian: ملااحمد, also Romanized as Mollā Aḩmad) is a village in Yowla Galdi Rural District, in the Central District of Showt County, West Azerbaijan Province, Iran. At the 2006 census, its population was 225 people divided into 50 families.
