= Mahmud Kandi =

Mahmud Kandi (Persian: محمود كندي) may refer to:

- Mahmud Kandi, Maku
- Mahmud Kandi, Showt
