= Qarah Aghaj-e Olya =

Qarah Aghaj-e Olya (Persian: قره اغاج عليا) may refer to:

- Qarah Aghaj-e Olya, West Azerbaijan
- Qarah Aghaj-e Olya, Zanjan
