= IMQ =

IMQ may refer to:

- Guangmingcheng railway station (China Railway Telegraph code: IMQ), a railway station in Guangming District, Shenzhen, Guangdong, China
- Maku International Airport (IATA: IMQ), an airport serving Maku and Showt, West Azerbaijan Province, Iran
