= KIAS =

KIAS may refer to:

- Korea Institute for Advanced Study
- Knots Indicated Airspeed

== See also ==
- Kias or Qiasi, a village in Qarah Quyun-e Jonubi Rural District, Qarah Quyun District, Showt County, West Azerbaijan Province, Iran
