= Cheshmeh Sara Rural District =

Rural district in West Azerbaijan province, Iran

Cheshmeh Sara Rural District Persian: دهستان چشمه ‌سرا
- Rural District
- Location within Iran
- Coordinates: 39°00′N 44°53′E
- Country: Iran
- Province: West Azerbaijan
- County: Showt
- District: Qarah Quyun
- Established: 2007
- Capital: Mokhur

Population (2016)
  - Total: 5,431
- Time zone: UTC+3:30 (IRST)

Cheshmeh Sara Rural District (Persian: دهستان چشمه‌ سرا) is in the Qarah Quyun District of Showt County, West Azerbaijan province, Iran. Its capital is the village of Mokhur.

== History ==
In 2007, Showt District was separated from Maku County in the establishment of Showt County, and Cheshmeh Sara Rural District was created in the new Qarah Quyun District.

== Demographics ==
=== Population ===
At the time of the 2011 census, the rural district's population was 6,343 inhabitants in 1,635 households. The 2016 census measured the population of the rural district as 5,431 in 1,600 households. The most populous of its 20 villages was Mokhur, with 2,321 people.

=== Other villages in the rural district ===
- Aghbolagh-e Mokhur
- Ali Kandi
- Danabolagh
- Hasan Kandi
- Il Bolaghi
- Ishkeh Su
- Khezerlu
- Khvorablu
- Kuchaluy-e Olya
- Kuchaluy-e Sofla
- Kura Bolagh
- Maleklu
- Pir Shah
- Samad Yurdi
- Shahr-e Silabi
- Sheykh Silu
- Zanjireh
