= Molla Ahmad =

Molla Ahmad (Persian: ملااحمد) may refer to:

- Molla Ahmad, Ardabil
- Molla Ahmad, Gilan
- Molla Ahmad, West Azerbaijan
