= Babur, Iran =

Babur or Baboor (Persian: بابور), also rendered as Babar or Baber, in Iran may refer to:

- Babur-e Ajam
- Babur-e Kord
