= Qarah Kahriz =

Qarah Kahriz or Qareh Kahriz (Persian: قره كهريز) may refer to:

- Qarah Kahriz, Markazi
- Qarah Kahriz, Chaypareh, West Azerbaijan Province
- Qarah Kahriz, Showt, West Azerbaijan Province
- Qarah Kahriz, Zanjan
- Qarah Kahriz District, in Markazi Province
- Qarah Kahriz Rural District, in Markazi Province
