= Qarah Aghaj, Showt =

Village in West Azerbaijan province, Iran

Qarah Aghaj Persian: قره اغاج
- Village
- Location within Iran
- Coordinates: 39°04′29″N 44°59′14″E
- Country: Iran
- Province: West Azerbaijan
- County: Showt
- District: Qarah Quyun
- Rural District: Qarah Quyun-e Jonubi

Population (2016)
  - Total: 804
- Time zone: UTC+3:30 (IRST)

Qarah Aghaj (Persian: قره اغاج) (Note: Also romanized as Qarah Āghāj and Qareh Āghāj; also known as Ghareh Aghaj Ghareh, Ghorboon, Ghorgoon, Kara Agāch, and Qareh Āqāj) is a village in Qarah Quyun-e Jonubi Rural District of Qarah Quyun District in Showt County, West Azerbaijan province, Iran.

== Demographics ==
=== Population ===
At the time of the 2006 National Census, the village's population was 875 in 207 households, when it was in the former Showt District of Maku County. The following census in 2011 counted 817 people in 240 households, by which time the district had been separated from the county in the establishment of Showt County. The rural district was transferred to the new Qarah Quyun District. The 2016 census measured the population of the village as 804 people in 249 households.
