= TBZ =

TBZ, tbz, or TbZ can refer to:

- A computer file, the result of tar and bzip2 operations.
- Tetrabenazine, a drug
- Thiabendazole, a parasiticide
- Tabriz International Airport
- Tahnoun bin Zayed Al Nahyan (national security advisor), National Security Advisor of UAE
- The ICAO Airline Designator of Iranian ATA Airlines
