= Babur-e Ajam =

Village in West Azerbaijan province, Iran

Babur-e Ajam Persian: ببرعجم
- Village
- Location within Iran
- Coordinates: 39°18′28″N 44°45′10″E
- Country: Iran
- Province: West Azerbaijan
- County: Showt
- District: Central
- Rural District: Yowla Galdi

Population (2016)
  - Total: 729
- Time zone: UTC+3:30 (IRST)

Babur-e Ajam (Persian: ببرعجم) (Note: Also romanized as Baboor Ajam, Bābūr ‘Ajam, and Bābūr-e ‘Ajam; also known as Bābār, Bāber, and Bābūr) is a village in Yowla Galdi Rural District of the Central District in Showt County, West Azerbaijan province, Iran.

== Demographics ==
=== Population ===
At the time of the 2006 National Census, the village's population was 602 in 123 households, when it was in the former Showt District of Maku County. The following census in 2011 counted 738 people in 160 households, by which time the district had been separated from the county in the establishment of Showt County. The rural district was transferred to the new Central District. The 2016 census measured the population of the village as 729 people in 169 households.
