= Yowla Galdi =

City in West Azerbaijan province, Iran

Yowla Galdi Persian: يولاگلدي
- City
- Location within Iran
- Coordinates: 39°17′04″N 44°49′01″E
- Country: Iran
- Province: West Azerbaijan
- County: Showt
- District: Central
- Established as a city: 2018

Population (2016)
  - Total: 3,935
- Time zone: UTC+3:30 (IRST)

Yowla Galdi (Persian: يولاگلدي) (Note: Also romanized as Yowlā Galdī) is a city in the Central District of Showt County, West Azerbaijan province, Iran. As a village, it was the capital of Chaybasar-e Sharqi Rural District of the former Poldasht District in Maku County until the rural district's capital was transferred to the village of Eshqabad. It was the capital of Yowla Galdi Rural District until its capital became the village of Azim Kandi.

== Demographics ==
=== Population ===
At the time of the 2006 National Census, Yowla Galdi's population was 3,590 in 789 households, when it was a village in Yowla Galdi Rural District of the former Showt District in Maku County. The following census in 2011 counted 3,845 people in 898 households, by which time the district had been separated from the county in the establishment of Showt County. The rural district was transferred to the new Central District. The 2016 census measured the population of the village as 3,935 people in 1,041 households.

Yowla Galdi was converted to a city in 2018.
