= Babur-e Kord =

Babur-e Kord ببركرد
- village
- Location within Iran
- Coordinates: 39°19′02″N 44°45′13″E
- Country: Iran
- Province: West Azerbaijan
- County: Showt
- Bakhsh: Central
- Rural District: Yowla Galdi

Population (2006)
  - Total: 201
- Time zone: UTC+3:30 (IRST)
  - Summer (DST): UTC+4:30 (IRDT)

Babur-e Kord (Persian: ببركرد, also Romanized as Bābūr-e Kord;babur or baber means Tiger in Persian also known as Qez Qal‘eh) is a village in Yowla Galdi Rural District, in the Central District of Showt County, West Azerbaijan Province, Iran. At the 2006 census, its population was 201, in 39 families.
