= Khalji (disambiguation) =

Khalji or Khilji may refer to:

- Khalji dynasty, a dynasty that ruled parts of the Indian subcontinent during 1290–1320
- Khalji dynasty of Bengal, a dynasty that ruled Bengal during 1204–1231
- Khalji dynasty of Malwa, a dynasty that ruled Malwa during 1436–1531
- Alauddin Khalji, ruler of the Khalji dynasty
- Khalaj people, a Turkic people
- Khalaj language, a Turkic language
- Khilji, Nepal, a village in Nepal
- Ghilji or Khilji, a Pashtun tribal confederacy

== See also ==
- Khalaj (disambiguation)
