= Maku International Airport =

Maku International Airport فرودگاه ماکو
- IATA: IMQ; ICAO: OITU

Summary
- Airport type: Public
- Owner: Government of Iran
- Operator: Iran Airports Company
- Serves: Showt
- Elevation AMSL: 956 m / 3,136 ft
- Coordinates: 39°11′33″N 044°55′31″E

Map
- Location of airport in Iran

Runways
Direction	Length		Surface
Direction	m	ft	Surface
13/31	3,300	10,827	Asphalt
- Source: IATA: IMQ

Maku International Airport (Persian: فرودگاه ماکو, lit. 'Forūdgāh-e Mākūh') (IATA: IMQ, ICAO: OITU), also known as Maku Airport, is an airport serving the cities of Maku and Showt, both located in the West Azerbaijan Province of Iran. The airport is located 20 kilometres (12 mi) on the east of Showt and 40 kilometres (25 mi) on the east-south-east of Maku.

== Airlines and destinations ==
Airlines	Destinations
ATA Airlines	Tehran–Mehrabad
Mahan Air	Tehran–Mehrabad
Pars Air	Tehran–Mehrabad
