= Marganlar =

City in West Azerbaijan province, Iran

Marganlar Persian: مرگنلر
- City
- Location within Iran
- Coordinates: 39°08′46″N 44°57′11″E
- Country: Iran
- Province: West Azerbaijan
- County: Showt
- District: Qarah Quyun
- Established as a city: 2007

Population (2016)
  - Total: 2,294
- Time zone: UTC+3:30 (IRST)

Marganlar (Persian: مرگنلر) (Note: Armenian: Մարական) is a city in, and the capital of, Qarah Quyun District of Showt County, West Azerbaijan province, Iran. It also serves as the administrative center for Qarah Quyun-e Jonubi Rural District. The city is the merger of the villages of Margan-e Azizabad, Margan-e Esmail Kandi, Margan-e Qadim, and Margan-e Vasat in 2007.

== Demographics ==
=== Population ===
At the time of the 2011 National Census, the city's population was 2,247 people in 615 households. The 2016 census measured the population as 2,294 people in 642 households.
