= Kayragach (disambiguation) =

Kayragach (Uzbek: Qayragʻoch, Kyrgyz: Кайрагач, Tajik: Қайрағоч) is the name of several places in Central Asia. The word literally means several local species of elm.

- Kayragach, Batken, Kyrgyzstan
- Kayragach, Osh, Kyrgyzstan
- Former name of Lolazor, Jabbor Rasulov District, exclave of Tajikistan in Kyrgyzstan
- Another name of Ladan-Kara, Suzak District, Jalal-Abad Region, Kyrgyzstan
- Qayragʻoch ore derposit, Ohangaron District, Tashkent Region, Uzbekistan (see Nekrasovite)
- Qayragʻoch, Yakkabogʻ District, Qashqadaryo Region, Uzbekistan

== See also ==
- Karaağaç (disambiguation), placenames of the same etymology
