= Qaraağac, Nakhchivan =

Qaraağac
- Municipality
- Location within Azerbaijan
- Coordinates: 39°42′36″N 44°55′18″E
- Country: Azerbaijan
- Autonomous republic: Nakhchivan
- District: Sadarak

Population (2005)
  - Total: 3,859
- Time zone: UTC+4 (AZT)

Qaraağac (also, Garaaghaj, Garaaghadzh and Karaagach) is a municipality and village in the Sadarak District of Nakhchivan, Azerbaijan. It is located 5 km in the north-east from the district center, in the important strategic position. Its population is busy with grain-growing, vegetable-growing, vine-growing and animal husbandry. There are secondary school and a medical center in the village. It has a population of 3,859.

== Etymology ==
Its name is related with Qaraağac (Garaaghaj) forest which is located in the end of the strait of the Cəhənnəm dərə (Hell valley), in Sadarak. Garaaghaj is a type of the tree. The name of the tree is made out from the Turkic words of qara (black, strong, hard) and ağac (tree) means ( Black tree).

== History ==
In 1997, by the decision of the Supreme Assembly of Nakhchivan Autonomous Republic, it was separated from the Sadarak village and became an independent administrative unit.
