= Khalaj, West Azerbaijan =

Khalaj خلج
- Village
- Location within Iran
- Coordinates: 36°46′03″N 46°36′31″E
- Country: Iran
- Province: West Azerbaijan
- County: Shahin Dezh
- Bakhsh: Keshavarz
- Rural District: Chaharduli

Population (2006)
  - Total: 58
- Time zone: UTC+3:30 (IRST)
  - Summer (DST): UTC+4:30 (IRDT)

Khalaj (Persian: خلج; also known as Khalaj-e Bālā and Khalaj-e ‘Olyā) is a village in Chaharduli Rural District, Keshavarz District, Shahin Dezh County, West Azerbaijan Province, Iran. At the 2006 census, its population was 58, in 14 families.
