= Ali Kandi, East Azerbaijan =

Ali Kandi علي كندي
- Village
- Location within Iran
- Coordinates: 36°53′04″N 47°00′05″E
- Country: Iran
- Province: East Azerbaijan
- County: Charuymaq
- Bakhsh: Central
- Rural District: Charuymaq-e Jonubegharbi

Population (2006)
  - Total: 34
- Time zone: UTC+3:30 (IRST)
  - Summer (DST): UTC+4:30 (IRDT)

Ali Kandi (Persian: علي كندي, also Romanized as ‘Alī Kandī and ‘Alīkandī) is a village in Charuymaq-e Jonubegharbi Rural District, in the Central District of Charuymaq County, East Azerbaijan Province, Iran. At the 2006 census, its population was 34, in 5 families.
