= Ezzatabad-e Sharm Dasht =

Ezzatabad-e Sharm Dasht عزت آباد شرمدشت
- Village
- Location within Iran
- Coordinates: 36°45′09″N 50°15′15″E
- Country: Iran
- Province: Gilan
- County: Rudsar
- Bakhsh: Rahimabad
- Rural District: Eshkevar-e Sofla

Population (2006)
  - Total: 197
- Time zone: UTC+3:30 (IRST)
  - Summer (DST): UTC+4:30 (IRDT)

Ezzatabad-e Sharm Dasht (Persian: عزت آباد شرمدشت, also Romanized as ʿEzzatābād-e Sharm Dasht; also known as Sharm Dasht) is a village in Eshkevar-e Sofla Rural District, Rahimabad District, Rudsar County, Gilan Province, Iran. At the 2006 census, its population was 197, in 48 families.
