= Kaju-ye Pain =

Kaju-ye Pain كاجوپائين
- Village
- Location within Iran
- Coordinates: 32°24′46″N 59°07′33″E
- Country: Iran
- Province: South Khorasan
- County: Khusf
- Bakhsh: Jolgeh-e Mazhan
- Rural District: Jolgeh-e Mazhan

Population (2006)
  - Total: 36
- Time zone: UTC+3:30 (IRST)
  - Summer (DST): UTC+4:30 (IRDT)

Kaju-ye Pain (Persian: كاجوپائين, also Romanized as Kājū-ye Pā’īn, Kāchū-e Pā’īn, and Kāhjū-e Pā’īn) is a village in Jolgeh-e Mazhan Rural District, Jolgeh-e Mazhan District, Khusf County, South Khorasan Province, Iran. At the 2006 census, its population was 36, in 11 families.
