= Qarah Aghaj, Khoy =

Village in West Azerbaijan, Iran

Qarah Aghaj قره اغاج
- Village
- Location within Iran
- Coordinates: 38°51′36″N 44°29′44″E
- Country: Iran
- Province: West Azerbaijan
- County: Khoy
- Bakhsh: Safayyeh
- Rural District: Sokmanabad

Population (2006)
  - Total: 347
- Time zone: UTC+3:30 (IRST)
  - Summer (DST): UTC+4:30 (IRDT)

Qarah Aghaj (Persian: قره اغاج, also Romanized as Qarah Āghāj) is a village in Sokmanabad Rural District, Safayyeh District, Khoy County, West Azerbaijan Province, Iran. At the 2006 census, its population was 347, in 61 families.
