= Bayram Kandi, Charuymaq =

Bayram Kandi بايرام كندي
- Village
- Location within Iran
- Coordinates: 36°59′34″N 47°20′59″E
- Country: Iran
- Province: East Azerbaijan
- County: Charuymaq
- Bakhsh: Shadian
- Rural District: Charuymaq-e Sharqi

Population (2006)
  - Total: 37
- Time zone: UTC+3:30 (IRST)
  - Summer (DST): UTC+4:30 (IRDT)

Bayram Kandi (Persian: بايرام كندي, also Romanized as Bāyrām Kandī) is a village in Charuymaq-e Sharqi Rural District, Shadian District, Charuymaq County, East Azerbaijan Province, Iran. At the 2006 census, its population was 37, in 6 families.
