= Qareh Aghaj, Sumay-ye Beradust =

Qareh Aghaj قره اغاج
- Village
- Location within Iran
- Coordinates: 37°45′45″N 44°49′39″E
- Country: Iran
- Province: West Azerbaijan
- County: Urmia
- Bakhsh: Sumay-ye Beradust
- Rural District: Beradust

Population (2006)
  - Total: 408
- Time zone: UTC+3:30 (IRST)
  - Summer (DST): UTC+4:30 (IRDT)

Qareh Aghaj (Persian: قره اغاج, also Romanized as Qareh Āghāj) is a village in Beradust Rural District, Sumay-ye Beradust District, Urmia County, West Azerbaijan Province, Iran. At the 2006 census, its population was 408, in 64 families.
