= Qarah Aqach =

Qarah Aqach قره‌آقاچ
- village
- Location within Iran
- Coordinates: 37°21′06″N 59°07′43″E
- Country: Iran
- Province: Razavi Khorasan
- County: Dargaz
- Bakhsh: Chapeshlu
- Rural District: Qara Bashlu

Population (2006)
  - Total: 11
- Time zone: UTC+3:30 (IRST)
  - Summer (DST): UTC+4:30 (IRDT)

Qarah Aqach (Persian: قره‌آقاچ, also Romanized as Qarah Āqāch; also known as Qareh Āghāj) is a village in Qara Bashlu Rural District, Chapeshlu District, Dargaz County, Razavi Khorasan Province, Iran. At the 2006 census, its population was 11, in 4 families.
