= ATA Airlines (Iran) =

Iranian airline

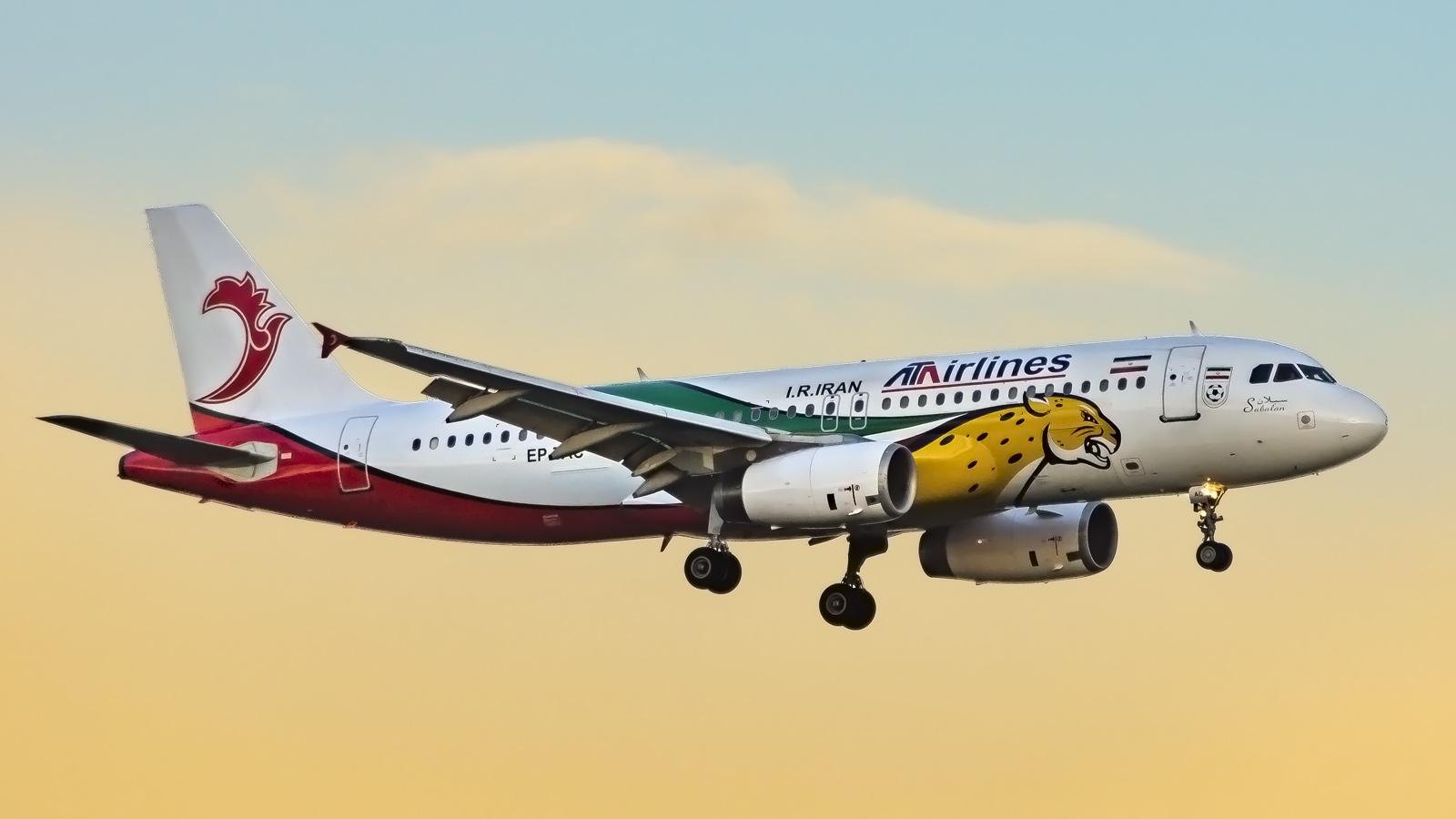
- ATA airlines Airbus A320
IATA	ICAO	Call sign
I3	TBZ	ATALAR
- Founded: 17 December 2008; 17 years ago
- Commenced operations: 2010; 16 years ago
- Hubs: Mashhad Shahid Hasheminejad International Airport; Tabriz Shahid Madani International Airport; Tehran Imam Khomeini International Airport; Tehran Mehrabad Airport
- Fleet size: 17
- Destinations: 36
- Headquarters: Tabriz, Iran
- Website: www.ataair.ir

ATA Airlines (Persian: هواپیمایی آتا, romanized: Havâpeymâyi-ye ÂTÂ) is an Iranian airline based at Tabriz International Airport, in northwestern Iran. It operates scheduled domestic and international services in the Middle East, as well as charter services.

The airline's name translates to 'father' in Azerbaijani languages. Although the company has a logo similar to that of American airline American Trans Air, it bears no relationship to that carrier.

== History ==
Former logo from 2014.

The airline was established on 17 December 2008 and started scheduled operations in 2010 with services on domestic routes. It operated its first flight on 31 December 2009 from Tabriz to Mashhad.

In 2016 the airline began its Tehran-Baku-Tabriz flights. In 2018 it announced its Mashhad-Islamabad flights. Also in the year of 2018 it announced flights to Kazan. In 2021 the airline added three ERJ 145s to the fleet. The route to Kazan was dropped in 2018. In 2021 it was reported that the airline was eyeing a base in the city of Ardabil.

In 2023 the airline due to regulatory issues was given two weeks to shape up to standards or face restrictions, following issues related to safety or regulatory compliance. Also in 2023 there was rumors of an explosion which delayed an ATA Airlines flight, the rumor was denied by the airline. In May of 2023 the airline was forced to suspend international flights, the suspension was lifted two months later.

In 2024 the three ERJ 145s were put into service. In 2024 the airline added its first MD 87. In 2025 after a conflict ATA Airlines was the first airline to restart flight operations out of Tabriz Airport

== Destinations ==
Country	City	Airport	Notes	Refs
Georgia	Tbilisi	Tbilisi International Airport		
Iran	Abadan	Ayatollah Jami International Airport		
Iran	Ahvaz	Qasem Soleimani International Airport		
Iran	Ardabil	Ardabil Airport		
Iran	Asaluyeh	Persian Gulf Airport		
Iran	Bandar Abbas	Bandar Abbas International Airport		
Iran	Birjand	Birjand International Airport		
Iran	Bushehr	Bushehr Airport		
Iran	Hamadan	Hamadan International Airport		
Iran	Isfahan	Shahid Beheshti International Airport		
Iran	Jiroft	Jiroft Airport		
Iran	Kerman	Ayatollah Hashemi Rafsanjani Airport		
Iran	Kermanshah	Kermanshah Airport		
Iran	Kish	Kish International Airport		
Iran	Maku	Maku International Airport		
Iran	Mashhad	Shahid Hasheminejad International Airport	Hub	
Iran	Qeshm	Qeshm International Airport		
Iran	Rasht	Rasht Airport		
Iran	Sabzevar	Sabzevar Airport		
Iran	Sari	Dasht-e Naz Airport		
Iran	Shiraz	Shahid Dastgheib International Airport		
Iran	Sirjan	Sirjan Airport		
Iran	Tabriz	Shahid Madani International Airport	Hub	
Iran	Tehran	Imam Khomeini International Airport	Hub	
Iran	Tehran	Mehrabad International Airport	Hub	
Iran	Urmia	Shahid Bakeri International Airport		
Iran	Yazd	Shahid Sadooghi Airport		
Iran	Zahedan	Zahedan Airport		
Iraq	Baghdad	Baghdad International Airport		
Iraq	Najaf	Al Najaf International Airport		
Kuwait	Kuwait City	Kuwait International Airport		
Russia	Moscow	Vnukovo International Airport	Seasonal charter	
Russia	Kazan		Terminated	
Turkey	Ankara	Ankara Esenboğa Airport		
Turkey	Istanbul	Istanbul Airport		
Turkey	İzmir	Adnan Menderes Airport	Seasonal	

== Fleet ==
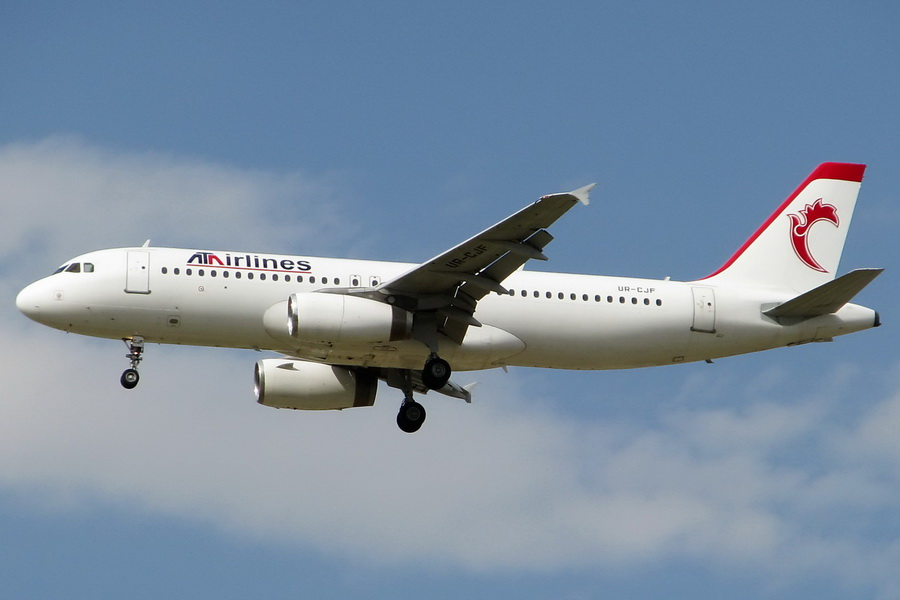
ATA Airlines Airbus A320-200

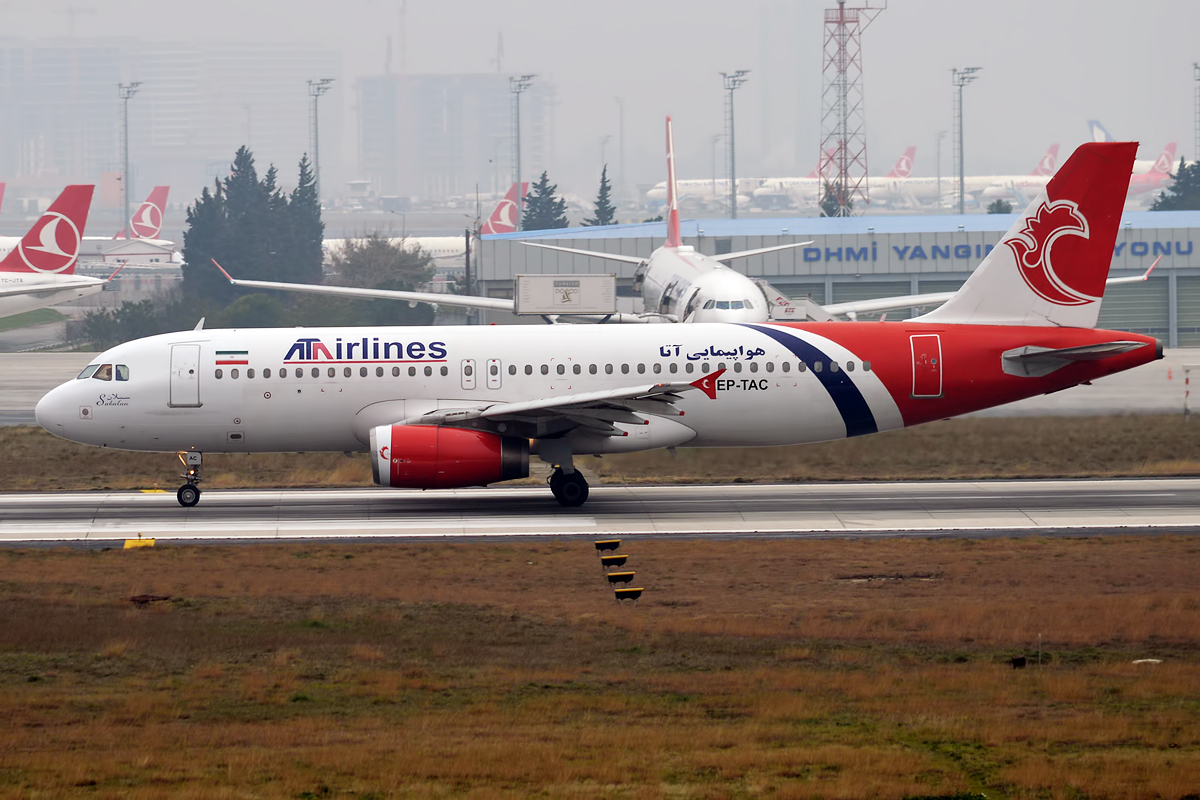
ATA Airlines Airbus A320-200

ATA Airlines McDonnell Douglas MD-83

=== Current fleet ===
As of August 2026, ATA Airlines operates the following aircraft:

ATA Airlines fleet
Aircraft	In service	Orders	Passengers	Notes
Airbus A320-200	2	—	168	
Boeing 737-300	2	—	138	
Boeing 737-500	1	—	129	
Embraer ERJ 145ER	3	—	50	
McDonnell Douglas MD-82	1	—	155	
McDonnell Douglas MD-83	5	—	161	
McDonnell Douglas MD-87	2	—	130	
Total	17	—		

=== Former fleet ===
The airline previously operated the following aircraft (as of August 2026):

- 1 further McDonnell Douglas MD-83 destroyed during the 2026 Iran war.
- 1 further Airbus A320-200
- 1 further Boeing 737-300

== See also ==
- List of airlines of Iran
