= Qareh Aghaj Rud =

Qareh Aghaj Rud قره اغاج رود
- Village
- Location within Iran
- Coordinates: 37°33′08″N 46°48′50″E
- Country: Iran
- Province: East Azerbaijan
- County: Hashtrud
- Bakhsh: Central
- Rural District: Soluk

Population (2006)
  - Total: 24
- Time zone: UTC+3:30 (IRST)
  - Summer (DST): UTC+4:30 (IRDT)

Qareh Aghaj Rud (Persian: قره اغاج رود, also Romanized as Qareh Āghāj Rūd; also known as Qarah Āghāj) is a village in Soluk Rural District, in the Central District of Hashtrud County, East Azerbaijan Province, Iran. As of the 2006 census, its population was 24, in four families.
