= Ezzatabad, Markazi =

Ezzatabad عزت اباد
- Village
- Country: Iran
- Province: Markazi
- County: Shazand
- Bakhsh: Sarband
- Rural District: Hendudar

Population (2006)
  - Total: 15
- Time zone: UTC+3:30 (IRST)
  - Summer (DST): UTC+4:30 (IRDT)

Ezzatabad (Persian: عزت اباد, also Romanized as ‘Ezzatābād) is a village in Hendudar Rural District, Sarband District, Shazand County, Markazi Province, Iran. At the 2006 census, its population was 15, in 4 families.
