= Khalaj, Razavi Khorasan =

Khalaj خلج
- Village
- Location within Iran
- Coordinates: 36°13′29″N 59°34′33″E
- Country: Iran
- Province: Razavi Khorasan
- County: Torqabeh and Shandiz
- Bakhsh: Torqabeh
- Rural District: Torqabeh

Population (2006)
  - Total: 17
- Time zone: UTC+3:30 (IRST)
  - Summer (DST): UTC+4:30 (IRDT)

Khalaj (Persian: خلج) is a village in Torqabeh Rural District, Torqabeh District, Torqabeh and Shandiz County, Razavi Khorasan Province, Iran. At the 2006 census, its population was 17, in 6 families.
