= Qareh Aghaj, Qazvin =

Qareh Aghaj قره اغاج
- Village
- Location within Iran
- Coordinates: 35°37′01″N 49°39′09″E
- Country: Iran
- Province: Qazvin
- County: Avaj
- Bakhsh: Abgarm
- Rural District: Kharaqan-e Sharqi

Population (2006)
  - Total: 150
- Time zone: UTC+3:30 (IRST)
  - Summer (DST): UTC+4:30 (IRDT)

Qareh Aghaj (Persian: قره اغاج, also Romanized as Qareh Āghāj, Qarā Āqāj, Qarah Āqāj, and Qareh Āqāj; also known as Karāghāch and Qarāqāch) is a village in Kharaqan-e Sharqi Rural District, Abgarm District, Avaj County, Qazvin Province, Iran. At the 2006 census, its population was 150, in 32 families.
