= Khalaj, Hamadan =

Khalaj خلج
- Village
- Location within Iran
- Coordinates: 35°33′27″N 49°00′12″E
- Country: Iran
- Province: Hamadan
- County: Razan
- Bakhsh: Central
- Rural District: Kharqan

Population (2006)
  - Total: 242
- Time zone: UTC+3:30 (IRST)
  - Summer (DST): UTC+4:30 (IRDT)

Khalaj (Persian: خلج) is a village in Kharqan Rural District, in the Central District of Razan County, Hamadan Province, Iran. At the 2006 census, its population was 242, in 68 families.
