= Qarah Aghaj-e Kushk =

Village in East Azerbaijan, Iran

Qarah Aghaj-e Kushk قره اغاج كوشك
- Village
- Location within Iran
- Coordinates: 37°02′31″N 47°06′22″E
- Country: Iran
- Province: East Azerbaijan
- County: Charuymaq
- Bakhsh: Shadian
- Rural District: Charuymaq-e Jonubesharqi

Population (2006)
  - Total: 74
- Time zone: UTC+3:30 (IRST)
  - Summer (DST): UTC+4:30 (IRDT)

Qarah Aghaj-e Kushk (Persian: قره اغاج كوشك, also Romanized as Qarah Āghāj-e Kūshk and Qareh Āghāj-e Kushk; also known as Qarah Āghāj-e Koshk) is a village in Charuymaq-e Jonubesharqi Rural District, Shadian District, Charuymaq County, East Azerbaijan Province, Iran. At the 2006 census, its population was 74, in 12 families.
