= Xələc, Nakhchivan =

Xələc
- Municipality
- Location within Azerbaijan
- Coordinates: 39°31′N 44°57′E
- Country: Azerbaijan
- Autonomous republic: Nakhchivan
- District: Sharur

Population (2005)
  - Total: 1,268
- Time zone: UTC+4 (AZT)

Xələc (also, Khaladzh, Khaladj and Khalaj) is a village and municipality in the Sharur District of Nakhchivan, Azerbaijan. It is located near the Khalaj Mount, eight kilometres (5.0 mi) north-west of the district center, on the bank of the Aras River. Its population is mainly busy with farming. There are secondary school, kindergarten, library, club and a medical center in the village. It has a population of 1,268.

== Etymology ==
The name of the village is related with xələclər (khalajlar) who were within the tribe union of Seljuk-Oghuz. A part of the xələclər who have participated in the conquest of the Middle East (12th–13th centuries) now living in Iran and Turkmenistan.

Xələclər (Khalajlar) - is the Turkic tribe that lived on the south bank of the Amu Darya River in the early Middle Ages. They were within of the tribe union of the Seljuk–Oghuz. From written sources, it becomes clear that the Xələclər have served in the armies of the Arab Caliphate. In Seljuk period, some of them came to Iran, and from there to Arran. The Xələclər who consist from several tribes and arms (generation) at the end of the 19th century, have lived in the Javad province. Basically, they were engaged in cattle-breeding. The names of the mountain and the village in the Sharur region are related with Xələclər.

== Khalaj archaeological site ==
Khalaj (Xələc, Khaladj, Халадж) archaeological site is a settlement of the Chalcolithic period. It is located 200 m south of the village of same name in the Sharur region, on the left bank of the Aras River, on the slope of the Khalaj mountain. When the local population used the area as a cemetery, many artifacts were scattered around.

=== Ceramics ===
Red clay pottery (jugs and bowl-type containers) are found here. Some examples is decorated with the scratching methods. From the settlement were found the grain stones, obsidian and flint panels. It attracts attention that it was painted in the back part of the flint panels with the comb-like instrument.

The findings are close to the materials of Ovçular Tepesi. Painted ceramic samples are the same with ceramics of the Eneolithic monuments in the east of the lake of Urmiya (Iran).

Along the sides of the irrigation canal which built from slopes of the mountain were found the samples of the ceramic of the first Bronze Age (Kura–Araxes culture). A bit away from the settlement were found samples of whole colored plates of the middle Bronze Age. Those plates, for ornaments and forms are the same of Kultepe I. Entirely, the settlement of Xələc belongs to the 4th–3rd millennium BC.
