= Ali Kandi, Urmia =

Ali Kandi علي كندي
- Village
- Location within Iran
- Coordinates: 37°42′09″N 45°04′08″E
- Country: Iran
- Province: West Azerbaijan
- County: Urmia
- Bakhsh: Nazlu
- Rural District: Nazlu-e Shomali

Population (2006)
  - Total: 159
- Time zone: UTC+3:30 (IRST)
  - Summer (DST): UTC+4:30 (IRDT)

Ali Kandi (Persian: علي كندي, also Romanized as ‘Alī Kandī and ‘Alīkandī) is a village in Nazlu-e Shomali Rural District, Nazlu District, Urmia County, West Azerbaijan Province, Iran. At the 2006 census, its population was 159, in 44 families.
