= Khalaj, East Azerbaijan =

Khalaj خلج
- Village
- Location within Iran
- Coordinates: 38°19′34″N 47°01′22″E
- Country: Iran
- Province: East Azerbaijan
- County: Heris
- Bakhsh: Central
- Rural District: Bedevostan-e Sharqi

Population (2006)
  - Total: 125
- Time zone: UTC+3:30 (IRST)
  - Summer (DST): UTC+4:30 (IRDT)

Khalaj (Persian: خلج; also known as Khaiash, Khoiash, and Kholash) is a village in Bedevostan-e Sharqi Rural District, in the Central District of Heris County, East Azerbaijan Province, Iran. At the 2006 census, its population was 125, in 29 families.
