= Ishgeh Su, Urmia =

Ishgeh Su ايشگه سو
- Village
- Location within Iran
- Coordinates: 37°45′05″N 44°53′49″E
- Country: Iran
- Province: West Azerbaijan
- County: Urmia
- Bakhsh: Sumay-ye Beradust
- Rural District: Beradust

Population (2006)
  - Total: 126
- Time zone: UTC+3:30 (IRST)
  - Summer (DST): UTC+4:30 (IRDT)

Ishgeh Su (Persian: ايشگه سو, also Romanized as Īshgeh Sū; also known as Ashkeh Sū; in Armenian: Հըշկասու) is a village in Beradust Rural District, Sumay-ye Beradust District, Urmia County, West Azerbaijan Province, Iran. At the 2006 census, its population was 126, in 18 families.
