= Ali Qandi =

Ali Qandi عالي قندي
- Village
- Location within Iran
- Coordinates: 27°18′51″N 54°40′21″E
- Country: Iran
- Province: Hormozgan
- County: Bastak
- Bakhsh: Central
- Rural District: Godeh

Population (2006)
  - Total: 225
- Time zone: UTC+3:30 (IRST)
  - Summer (DST): UTC+4:30 (IRDT)

Ali Qandi (Persian: عالي قندي, also Romanized as ‘Alī Qandī; also known as ‘Alī Kandī) is a village in Godeh Rural District, in the Central District of Bastak County, Hormozgan Province, Iran. At the 2006 census, its population was 225, in 52 families.
