= Margan Top =

- Margan Pass
- Location within Jammu and Kashmir
- Elevation: 3,696 m (12,126 ft)

Location
- Location: Anantnag, Jammu and Kashmir (India)
- Coordinates: 33°44′58″N 75°29′17″E

Margan Top or Margan Pass is a mountain pass, connecting Warwan Valley with the main Kashmir Valley. It is located in Anantnag district in the Indian state of Jammu and Kashmir.
