= Bayram Kandi, Khoy =

Bayram Kandi بايرام كندي
- Village
- Location within Iran
- Coordinates: 38°31′45″N 45°01′24″E
- Country: Iran
- Province: West Azerbaijan
- County: Khoy
- Bakhsh: Central
- Rural District: Qarah Su

Population (2006)
  - Total: 209
- Time zone: UTC+3:30 (IRST)
  - Summer (DST): UTC+4:30 (IRDT)

Bayram Kandi (Persian: بايرام كندي, also Romanized as Bāyrām Kandī; also known as Bahrām Kandī, Bairamkand, and Bayramkend) is a village in Qarah Su Rural District, in the Central District of Khoy County, West Azerbaijan Province, Iran. At the 2006 census, its population was 209, in 50 families.
