= Khalaj-e Malmir =

Khalaj-e Malmir خلج مالمير
- Village
- Location within Iran
- Coordinates: 33°45′44″N 49°06′02″E
- Country: Iran
- Province: Markazi
- County: Shazand
- Bakhsh: Sarband
- Rural District: Malmir

Population (2006)
  - Total: 198
- Time zone: UTC+3:30 (IRST)
  - Summer (DST): UTC+4:30 (IRDT)

Khalaj-e Malmir (Persian: خلج مالمير, also Romanized as Khalaj-e Mālmīr; also known as Khalach and Khalaj) is a village in Malmir Rural District, Sarband District, Shazand County, Markazi Province, Iran. At the 2006 census, its population was 198, in 57 families.
