= Khalaj-e Olya =

Khalaj-e Olya خلج عليا
- Village
- Location within Iran
- Coordinates: 33°41′43″N 49°21′40″E
- Country: Iran
- Province: Markazi
- County: Shazand
- Bakhsh: Sarband
- Rural District: Hendudar

Population (2006)
  - Total: 54
- Time zone: UTC+3:30 (IRST)
  - Summer (DST): UTC+4:30 (IRDT)

Khalaj-e Olya (Persian: خلج عليا, also Romanized as Khalaj-e ‘Olyā; also known as Khalaj-e Bālā) is a village in Hendudar Rural District, Sarband District, Shazand County, Markazi Province, Iran. At the 2006 census, its population was 54, in 14 families.
