= Qaraağac, Sabirabad =

Qaraağac
- Municipality
- Location within Azerbaijan
- Coordinates: 39°54′05″N 48°55′03″E
- Country: Azerbaijan
- Rayon: Sabirabad

Population
  - Total: 2,080
- Time zone: UTC+4 (AZT)
  - Summer (DST): UTC+5 (AZT)

Qaraağac (also, known as Karaagach, Karagach, Kara-Ogatch, and Yakha-Kara-Agach) is a village and municipality in the Sabirabad Rayon of Azerbaijan. The village has a population of 2,080 people.
