= Qaraağac, Jalilabad =

Populated center of Azerbaijan

Qaraağac is a village and municipality in the Jalilabad Rayon of Azerbaijan. It has a population of 276.
