= Qarah Aghaj-e Olya, West Azerbaijan =

Qarah Aghaj-e Olya قره اغاج عليا
- Village
- Location within Iran
- Coordinates: 37°32′17″N 45°08′58″E
- Country: Iran
- Province: West Azerbaijan
- County: Urmia
- Bakhsh: Central
- Rural District: Bakeshluchay

Population (2006)
  - Total: 376
- Time zone: UTC+3:30 (IRST)
  - Summer (DST): UTC+4:30 (IRDT)

Qarah Aghaj-e Olya (Persian: قره اغاج عليا, also Romanized as Qarah Āghāj-e ‘Olyā; also known as Qarah Āghāj and Qareh Āghāj) is a village in Bakeshluchay Rural District, in the Central District of Urmia County, West Azerbaijan Province, Iran. At the 2006 census, its population was 376, in 101 families.
