= Showt =

City in West Azerbaijan province, Iran

Showt Persian: شوط
- City
- Location within Iran
- Coordinates: 39°13′11″N 44°46′20″E
- Country: Iran
- Province: West Azerbaijan
- County: Showt
- District: Central

Population (2016)
  - Total: 25,381
- Time zone: UTC+3:30 (IRST)

Showt (Persian: شوط) (Note: Also romanized as Showţ; also known as Shoţ; Armenian: Շոթ) is a city in the Central District of Showt County, West Azerbaijan province, Iran, serving as capital of both the county and the district.

== Demographics ==
=== Population ===
At the time of the 2006 National Census, the city's population was 19,759 in 4,654 households, when it was capital of the former Showt District in Maku County. The following census in 2011 counted 21,047 people in 5,491 households, by which time the district had been separated from the county in the establishment of Showt County. Showt was transferred to the new Central District as the county's capital. The 2016 census measured the population of the city as 25,381 people in 7,219 households.
