= Qarah Aghaj, East Azerbaijan =

Qarah Aghaj قره اغاج
- Village
- Location within Iran
- Coordinates: 38°21′15″N 45°58′08″E
- Country: Iran
- Province: East Azerbaijan
- County: Shabestar
- Bakhsh: Sufian
- Rural District: Chelleh Khaneh

Population (2006)
  - Total: 470
- Time zone: UTC+3:30 (IRST)
  - Summer (DST): UTC+4:30 (IRDT)

Qarah Aghaj (Persian: قره اغاج, also Romanized as Qarah Āghāj and Qareh Āghāj; also known as Ghareh Aghaj, Karaagach, Qara Agāch, and Qareh Āqāch) is a village in Chelleh Khaneh Rural District, Sufian District, Shabestar County, East Azerbaijan Province, Iran. At the 2006 census, its population was 470, in 118 families.
