= Qareh Khaj =

Qareh Khach قره خاچ
- Village
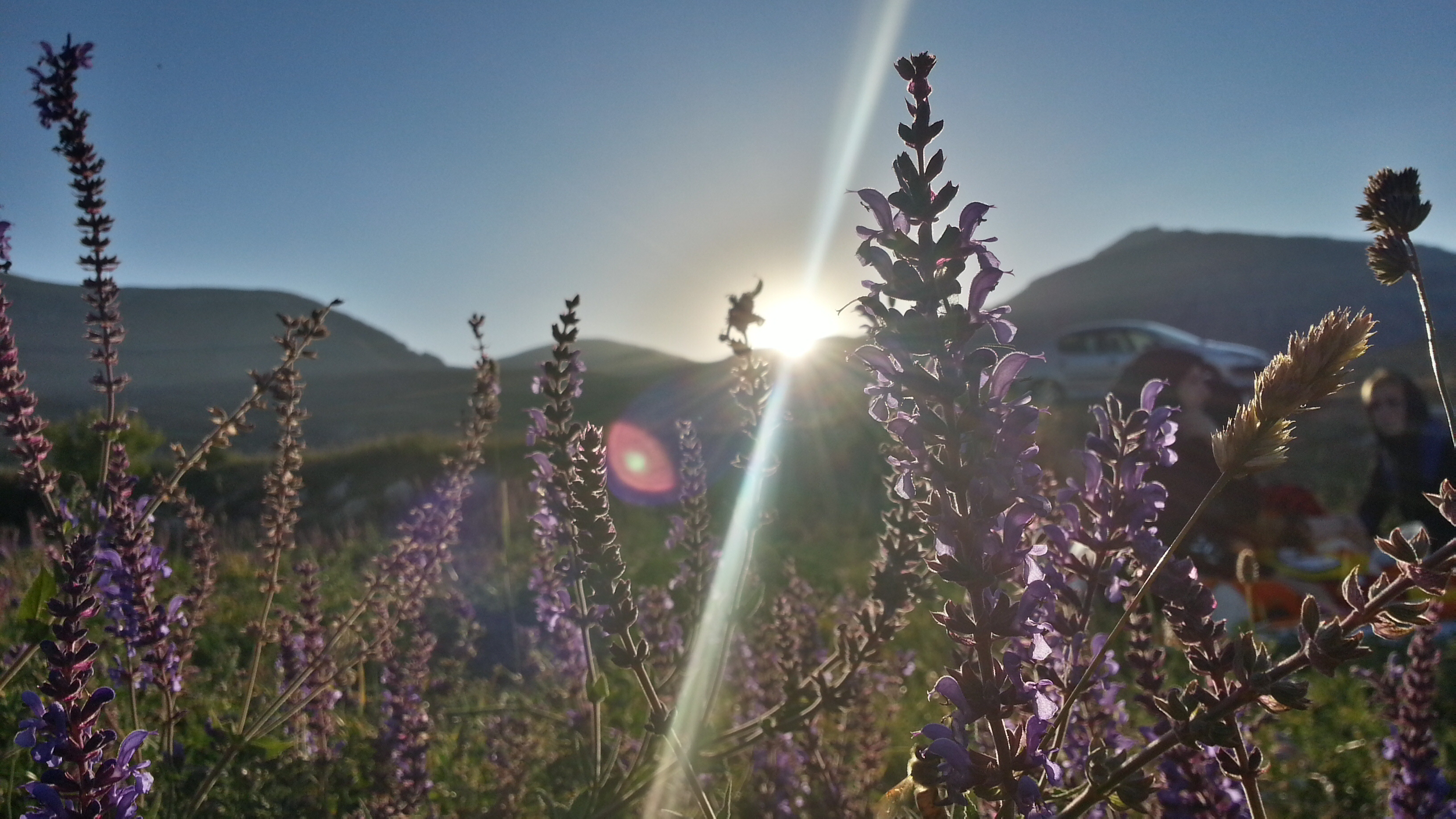

- Location within Iran
- Coordinates: 39°15′31″N 44°27′42″E
- Country: Iran
- Province: West Azerbaijan
- County: Maku
- Bakhsh: Central
- Rural District: Qaleh Darrehsi

Population (2006)
  - Total: 274
- Time zone: UTC+3:30 (IRST)
  - Summer (DST): UTC+4:30 (IRDT)

Qareh Khaj (Persian: قره خاج, also Romanized as Qareh Khāj; also known as Kara Agach, Qarah Khāj, Qareh Āghāj, and Qareh Khāch) is a village in Qaleh Darrehsi Rural District, in the Central District of Maku County, West Azerbaijan Province, Iran. At the 2006 census, its population was 274, in 73 families. This village is populated by Azerbaijani Turks.
