= Yowla Galdi Rural District =

Rural district in West Azerbaijan province, Iran

Yowla Galdi Rural District Persian: دهستان يولاگلدئ
- Rural District
- Location within Iran
- Coordinates: 39°16′N 44°48′E
- Country: Iran
- Province: West Azerbaijan
- County: Showt
- District: Central
- Established: 1991
- Capital: Azim Kandi

Population (2016)
  - Total: 12,871
- Time zone: UTC+3:30 (IRST)

Yowla Galdi Rural District (Persian: دهستان يولاگلدئ) is in the Central District of Showt County, West Azerbaijan province, Iran. Its capital is the village of Azim Kandi. The previous capital of the rural district was the village of Yowla Galdi, now a city.

== Administrative history ==
Yowla Galdi Rural District was established as one of a group of rural districts in Maku County during the reorganisation of administrative divisions in West Azerbaijan province. It later became part of Showt County when that county was established. In 2018, the village of Yowla Galdi was elevated to city status, and the village of Azim Kandi was designated as the new administrative centre of the rural district.

== Demographics ==
=== Population ===
At the time of the 2006 National Census, the rural district's population (as a part of the former Showt District of Maku County) was 11,616 in 2,587 households. There were 12,382 inhabitants in 2,938 households at the following census of 2011, by which time the district had been separated from the county in the establishment of Showt County. The rural district was transferred to the new Central District. The 2016 census measured the population of the rural district as 12,871 in 3,358 households. The most populous of its 26 villages was Azim Kandi, with 476 people.

=== Other villages in the rural district ===
- Ahmadabad
- Babur-e Ajam
- Bayancholi-ye Ajam
- Dizaj-e Tavil
- Kesharkhi
- Khalaj-e Ajam
- Khalaj-e Kord
- Qaban Basan
- Qarah Ayaq
- Qurd ol Daran-e Kord
