= Qarah Quyun-e Shomali Rural District =

Rural district in West Azerbaijan province, Iran

Qarah Quyun-e Shomali Rural District Persian: دهستان قره قويون شمالي
- Rural District
- Location within Iran
- Coordinates: 39°08′N 44°47′E
- Country: Iran
- Province: West Azerbaijan
- County: Showt
- District: Central
- Established: 1987
- Capital: Sufi

Population (2016)
  - Total: 5,284
- Time zone: UTC+3:30 (IRST)

Qarah Quyun-e Shomali Rural District (Persian: دهستان قره قويون شمالي) is in the Central District of Showt County, West Azerbaijan province, Iran. Its capital is the village of Sufi.

== Demographics ==
=== Population ===
At the time of the 2006 National Census, the rural district's population (as a part of the former Showt District in Maku County) was 6,170 in 1,366 households. There were 6,140 inhabitants in 1,647 households at the following census of 2011, by which time the district had been separated from the county in the establishment of Showt County. The rural district was transferred to the new Central District. The 2016 census measured the population of the rural district as 5,284 in 1,592 households. The most populous of its 26 villages was Sufi, with 5,284 people.

=== Other villages in the rural district ===
- Kandal
- Mohammad Karim Kandi
- Qarah Zamin
- Seniq
- Sharif Kandi
- Soleyman Kandi
- Tavreh
- Teymurabad
