= Qarah Quyun-e Jonubi Rural District =

Rural district in West Azerbaijan province, Iran

Qarah Quyun-e Jonubi Rural District Persian: دهستان قره قويون جنوبي
- Rural District
- Location within Iran
- Coordinates: 39°07′N 44°54′E
- Country: Iran
- Province: West Azerbaijan
- County: Showt
- District: Qarah Quyun
- Established: 1987
- Capital: Marganlar

Population (2016)
  - Total: 4,421
- Time zone: UTC+3:30 (IRST)

Qarah Quyun-e Jonubi Rural District (Persian: دهستان قره قويون جنوبي) is in Qarah Quyun District of Showt County, West Azerbaijan province, Iran. It is administered from the city of Marganlar.

== Demographics ==
=== Population ===
At the time of the 2006 National Census, the rural district's population (as a part of the former Showt District in Maku County) was 13,931 in 3,162 households. There were 4,360 inhabitants in 1,253 households at the following census of 2011, by which time the district had been separated from the county in the establishment of Showt County. The rural district was transferred to the new Qarah Quyun District. The 2016 census measured the population of the rural district as 4,421 in 1,345 households. The most populous of its 12 villages was Tazeh Kand-e Qadim, with 2,087 people.

=== Other villages in the rural district ===
- Bash Kahriz
- Duz Aghol
- Incheh-ye Qadim
- Qarah Aghaj
- Qiasi
