= Qarah Quyun District =

District in West Azerbaijan province, Iran

Qarah Quyun District Persian: بخش قره قويون
- District
- Location within Iran
- Coordinates: 39°04′N 44°54′E
- Country: Iran
- Province: West Azerbaijan
- County: Showt
- Established: 2007
- Capital: Marganlar

Population (2016)
  - Total: 12,146
- Time zone: UTC+3:30 (IRST)

Qarah Quyun District (Persian: بخش قره قويون) is in Showt County, West Azerbaijan province, Iran. Its capital is the city of Marganlar.

== History ==
In 2007, Showt District was separated from Maku County in the establishment of Showt County, which was divided into two districts of two rural districts each, with the city of Showt as its capital.

== Demographics ==
=== Population ===
At the time of the 2011 census, the district's population was 12,950 people in 3,503 households. The 2016 census measured the population of the district as 12,146 inhabitants in 3,587 households.

=== Administrative divisions ===
Qarah Quyun District Population
| Administrative Divisions | 2011 | 2016 |
|---|---|---|
| Cheshmeh Sara RD | 6,343 | 5,431 |
| Qarah Quyun-e Jonubi RD | 4,360 | 4,421 |
| Marganlar (city) | 2,247 | 2,294 |
| Total | 12,950 | 12,146 |
RD = Rural District
