= Central District (Showt County) =

District in West Azerbaijan province, Iran

Central District (Showt County) Persian: بخش مرکزی شهرستان شوط
- District
- Location within Iran
- Coordinates: 39°11′N 44°47′E
- Country: Iran
- Province: West Azerbaijan
- County: Showt
- Established: 2007
- Capital: Showt

Population (2016)
  - Total: 43,536
- Time zone: UTC+3:30 (IRST)

The Central District of Showt County (Persian: بخش مرکزی شهرستان شوط) is in West Azerbaijan province, Iran. Its capital is the city of Showt.

== History ==
In 2007, Showt District was separated from Maku County in the establishment of Showt County, which was divided into two districts of two rural districts each, with Showt as its capital. The village of Yowla Galdi was converted to a city in 2018.

== Demographics ==
=== Population ===
At the time of the 2011 census, the district's population was 39,569 people in 10,076 households. The 2016 census measured the population of the district as 43,536 inhabitants in 12,169 households.

=== Administrative divisions ===
Central District (Showt County) Population
Administrative Divisions	2011	2016
Qarah Quyun-e Shomali RD	6,140	5,284
Yowla Galdi RD	12,382	12,871
Showt (city)	21,047	25,381
Yowla Galdi (city) (Note: Became a city after the 2016 census)		
Total	39,569	43,536
RD = Rural District
