= Showt District =

Former district in West Azerbaijan province, Iran

Poldasht District Persian: بخش شوط
- Former District
- Location within Iran
- Coordinates: 39°07′N 44°52′E
- Country: Iran
- Province: West Azerbaijan
- County: Maku
- Established: 1989
- Capital: Showt

Population (2006)
  - Total: 51,476
- Time zone: UTC+3:30 (IRST)

Showt District (Persian: بخش شوط) is a former administrative district of Maku County, West Azerbaijan province, Iran. Its capital was the city of Showt.

== History ==
In 2007, the district was separated from the county in the establishment of Showt County.

== Demographics ==
=== Population ===
At the time of the 2006 census, the district's population was 51,476 in 11,769 households.

=== Administrative divisions ===
Showt District Population
| Administrative Divisions | 2006 |
|---|---|
| Qarah Quyun-e Jonubi RD | 13,931 |
| Qarah Quyun-e Shomali RD | 6,170 |
| Yowla Galdi RD | 11,616 |
| Showt (city) | 19,759 |
| Total | 51,476 |
RD = Rural District
