= Showt County =

County in West Azerbaijan province, Iran

Showt County Persian: شهرستان شوط
- County
- Location of Showt County in West Azerbaijan province (top, purple)

- Location of West Azerbaijan province in Iran
- Coordinates: 39°07′N 44°52′E
- Country: Iran
- Province: West Azerbaijan
- Established: 2007
- Capital: Showt
- Districts: Central, Qarah Quyun

Population (2016)
  - Total: 55,682
- Time zone: UTC+3:30 (IRST)

Showt County (Persian: شهرستان شوط) (Note: South Azerbaijani: شوط بؤلگه‌سی) is in West Azerbaijan province, Iran. Its capital is the city of Showt.

== History ==
In 2007, Showt District was separated from Maku County in the establishment of Showt County, which was divided into two districts of two rural districts each, with Showt as its capital. The village of Yowla Galdi was converted to a city in 2018.

== Demographics ==
=== Population ===
At the time of the 2011 census, the county's population was 52,519 people in 13,572 households. The 2016 census measured the population of the county as 55,682 in 15,756 households.

=== Administrative divisions ===
Showt County's population history and administrative structure over two consecutive censuses are shown in the following table.

Showt County Population
Administrative Divisions	2011	2016
Central District	39,569	43,536
Qarah Quyun-e Shomali RD	6,140	5,284
Yowla Galdi RD	12,382	12,871
Showt (city)	21,047	25,381
Yowla Galdi (city) (Note: Became a city after the 2016 census)		
Qarah Quyun District	12,950	12,146
Cheshmeh Sara RD	6,343	5,431
Qarah Quyun-e Jonubi RD	4,360	4,421
Marganlar (city)	2,247	2,294
Total	52,519	55,682
RD = Rural District

== See also ==
Media related to Showt County at Wikimedia Commons
