= List of accidents and incidents involving the Yakovlev Yak-40 =

The Yak-40 suffered 155 accidents and incidents for a total of 870 fatalities.

== 1970s ==
3 September 1970
Aeroflot Flight Sh-4, a Yak-40 (CCCP-87690), struck the side of Mount Airy-Tash, 56 mi northeast of Leninabad (now Khujand), Tajik SSR at 2,100 m (6,890 ft) due to pilot error, killing all 21 on board.
28 July 1971
An Aeroflot Yak-40 (CCCP-87719), overran the runway on landing at Lipetsk Airport after landing too fast due to pilot error; there were no casualties, but the aircraft was written off.
25 January 1972
A Bakhtar Afghan Airlines Yak-40 (YA-KAD) struck trees while on approach to Khost Airport, Afghanistan, suffering severe damage; there were no casualties, but the aircraft was written off.
4 May 1972
Aeroflot Flight B-608, a Yak-40 (CCCP-87778), crashed while on approach to Bratsk Airport after a loss of control caused by windshear, killing all 18 on board.
22 October 1972
An Aeroflot Yak-40 (CCCP-87819) stalled and crashed on takeoff from Krasnoyarsk Severny Airport due to icing; there were no casualties, but the aircraft was written off.
28 February 1973
Aeroflot Flight X-167, a Yak-40 (CCCP-87602), crashed next to the runway at Semipalatinsk Airport during takeoff, killing all 32 on board; the cause was not determined, but stabilizer failure or pilot errors were theorized.
8 August 1973
Aeroflot Flight A-547, a Yak-40 (CCCP-87790), ran off the runway on takeoff from Arkhangelsk Airport after the elevators locked up due to an electrical problem, killing the co-pilot. The pilot should have aborted the takeoff instead of continuing.
2 November 1973
Aeroflot Flight 19, a Yak-40 (CCCP-87607), was hijacked by four people who demanded money and to be taken to Sweden; the plane was stormed on the ground at Moscow and the hijackers arrested. Two out of the four hijackers died.
21 December 1973
An Aeroflot Yak-40 (CCCP-87629) landed hard at Erebuni Airport in fog; there were no casualties, but the aircraft was written off.
1973
An Aeroflot Yak-40 (CCCP-87746) was reportedly written off in an accident at an unknown location; the aircraft was struck off charge on 7 September 1973.
9 April 1974
An Aeroflot Yak-40 (CCCP-87369) ran off the runway at Kazan Airport following an aborted takeoff; all 34 on board survived, but the aircraft was written off.
2 May 1974
Aeroflot Flight 1255, a Yak-40 (CCCP-87398), ran off the runway at Rostov Airport following an aborted takeoff, killing one of 38 on board.
23 May 1974
Aeroflot Flight 166N, a Yak-40 (CCCP-87579), crashed on approach to Kiev due to possible crew incapacitation caused by carbon monoxide poisoning, killing all 29 on board.
14 December 1974
Aeroflot Flight 124, a Yak-40 (CCCP-87630), overran the runway at Bukhara Airport following an aborted takeoff due to a locked elevator, killing seven of 19 on board.
28 January 1975
An Aeroflot Yak-40 (CCCP-87825) ran off the runway at Zaporozhye Airport following an aborted takeoff due to a loss of control; all 17 on board survived, but the aircraft was written off.
19 February 1975
General Air Flight 1745, a Yak-40FG (D-BOBD), ran off the runway on landing at Saarbrücken Airport following thrust reverser failure; all 16 on board survived, but the aircraft was written off. The aircraft was operating a Frankfurt-Saarbrücken service on behalf of Lufthansa.
15 July 1975
Aeroflot Flight E-15, a Yak-40 (CCCP-87415) struck Mount Mtirala, Caucasus Mountains, during a go-around at Chorokh Airport in poor weather, killing all 41 on board.
15 August 1975
Aeroflot Flight 53A, a Yak-40 (CCCP-87323), entered a downdraft and nearly stalled and subsequently crashed on approach to Krasnovodsk Airport due to pilot error and unfavorable weather conditions, killing 23 of 28 on board in Turkmenistan's worst-ever accident.
6 October 1975
An Aeroflot Yak-40 (CCCP-87328) landed wheels-up short of the runway at Kirov Airport following an unexplained throttle down of all three engines; The aircraft struck obstacles, suffering severe damage and catching fire in the process but all 32 on board survived.
22 October 1975
Aeroflot Flight L-98, a Yak-40 (CCCP-87458), crashed near Novgorod Airport. Visibility was poor at Novgorod due to fog, but this was not forecast to the crew. A straight-in approach was attempted, but the aircraft went off course after passing the outer marker. The descent continued until the landing gear and wing struck a building and later crashed into an apartment building and a car, killing all six on board and five on the ground.
19 March 1976
A Syrianair Yak-40S2 (YK-AQC) was hit by a RPG during boarding at Beirut International Airport; Lebanese Prime Minister Rashid Karam had just boarded the aircraft, but he survived the attack.
2 June 1976
An Aeroflot/Lithuania CAA Yak-40 (CCCP-87541) had to make an emergency landing on a wet meadow while approaching Kiev-Zhulhyany Airport, Ukraine after the flight engineer had accidentally shut down all 3 engines and the flight crew were unable to restart the engines. Everybody on board survived uninjured.
9 September 1976
Aeroflot Flight S-31, a Yak-40 (CCCP-87772) from Rostov Airport to Kerch Airport, collided in mid-air with Aeroflot Flight 7957, an Antonov An-24 (CCCP-46518), over the Black Sea 37 km (23 mi) off Anapa due to ATC errors, killing all 70 on board both aircraft. The fuselage of the Yak-40 was never found.
7 December 1976
Aeroflot Flight 929, a Yak-40 (CCCP-87756), force-landed short of the runway at Armavir Air Base due to fuel exhaustion following a diversion from Mineralnye Vody; all 29 on board survived.
17 December 1976
An Aeroflot Yak-40 (CCCP-88208) performing a cargo flight crashed shortly after takeoff from Ust-Kut Airport in poor visibility, killing all seven on board. An investigation determined that the crew failed to follow the pre-flight checklist.
1976
An Aeroflot Yak-40 (CCCP-87563) was written off in Russia.
30 March 1977
Aeroflot Flight 925N, a Yak-40 (CCCP-87738), crashed on approach to Zhdanov Airport in poor visibility after descending too low, killing eight of 28 on board.
11 October 1977
A CSA Yak-40 was hijacked by two men, each armed with a pistol, and flown to Frankfurt where the hijackers surrendered to German authorities and requested political asylum.
13 October 1977
Aeroflot Flight 75 had its cargo hatch opened mid-flight en route to Mykolaiv Airport, resulting in the deaths of 2 people.
8 April 1978
An Aeroflot Yak-40 (CCCP-87911) stalled on takeoff from Aldan Airport and crashed next to the runway; all 17 on board survived.
17 May 1978
A CSA Yak-40 was hijacked by one man (a resident of Brno) but was overpowered and taken into custody when the aircraft landed in Prague.
29 May 1978
A CSA Yak-40 was hijacked by someone demanding to be taken to West Germany. The hijacker was overpowered by the crew and the aircraft diverted to Prague where the hijacker was arrested.
2 October 1978
An Aeroflot Yak-40 (CCCP-87544) overran the runway on landing at Tbilisi Airport following a high-speed, flapless landing due to hydraulic failure; all 30 on board survived. Water that had accidentally leaked into the hydraulic system froze, causing the failure.
7 October 1978
Aeroflot Flight 1080, a Yak-40 (CCCP-87437), crashed on climbout from Koltsovo Airport following engine failure caused by icing, killing all 38 on board.
20 March 1979
An Aeroflot Yak-40K (CCCP-87930) crashed in a dacha colony near Chardzhou Airport due to a loss of control after the aircraft encountered wake turbulence from an Mi-6; all 35 on board survived.
31 October 1979
An Aeroflot Yak-40K (CCCP-87946) force-landed near Tikhoresk, Russia after all three engines lost power due to fuel exhaustion following a deviation from the flight route due to bad weather; all five crew survived.
16 November 1979
An Aeroflot Yak-40 (CCCP-87454) was being ferried from Velikiy Ustlug to Vologda as Flight 564 when it crashed short of the runway at Vologda Airport after descending too low, killing three of the five crew. ATC had falsified weather bulletins to allow certain aircraft to land.

== 1980s ==
3 February 1980
A Cubana Yak-40 (CU-T1219) crashed on landing at Baracoa Airport, killing one of 37 on board.
8 June 1980
A TAAG Angola Airlines Yak-40K (D2-TYC) crashed near Matala, Angola, killing all 19 on board; the aircraft was probably shot down by a Zambian Shenyang J-6.
12 June 1980
Aeroflot Flight Sh-88, a Yak-40 (CCCP-87689), struck the slope of a mountain 44 km (27 mi) northwest of Dushanbe Airport due to navigational errors by the crew while attempting to avoid bad weather, killing all 29 on board.
18 July 1980
An Aeroflot Yak-40 (CCCP-87793) force-landed on a highway in Arkhangelsk after the flight engineer shut down all three engines by mistake; all 27 on board survived.
29 August 1981
Aeroflot Flight 674, a Yak-40 (CCCP-87346), crashed at Zeya, Russia while on approach after descending too low, killing three of 34 on board.
18 September 1981
Aeroflot Flight V-652, a Yak-40 (CCCP-87455) from Irkutsk Airport to Ilimskiy Airport, collided in mid-air with an Aeroflot Mi-8 helicopter (CCCP-22268) on a training flight while approaching its destination airport. The supposed site of the collision occurred in the clouds. All 33 on board the Yak-40 and seven occupants of the Mi-8 were killed, making it the third deadliest Yak-40 incident at the time.
16 January 1982
An Aeroflot Yak-40 (CCCP-87902) landed wheels-up at Shevchenko, Kazakhstan due to fuel exhaustion; all three crew survived.
31 May 1982
An Aeroflot Yak-40 (CCCP-87485) veered off the runway on landing at Dnepropetrovsk Airport after landing hard in a crosswind; all 35 on board survived.
14 August 1982
A MAP Kazan MSZ Yak-40 (CCCP-98102) broke-up in mid-air and crashed near Bazarnyye Mataki, Russia due to excessive descent following an in-flight fire, killing the four crew.
19 April 1983
Aeroflot Flight E-46, a Yak-40 (CCCP-87291), struck a mountain 26 mi from Leninakan Airport after the crew deviated from the flight route and later descended too low, killing all 21 on board.
29 June 1983
While flying over Kazarman, Kyrgyzstan, an Aeroflot Yak-40 (CCCP-87803) encountered a downdraft at 7,200 m (23,600 ft) and lost 2,000 m (6,600 ft) with a load of 5.5 g. After regaining control, the crew made an emergency landing at Osh Airport with no casualties to the nine on board. During inspection, it was found that the aircraft had suffered severe structural damage in the descent, and it was written off.
15 August 1983
A MAP Arsenyev APO Yak-40K (CCCP-87201) overran the runway on takeoff from Omsukchan Airport after failing to lift off due to overloading; all nine on board survived.
11 October 1985
Aeroflot Flight 07G, a Yak-40 (CCCP-87803), struck a mountain side 29 mi west of Kutaisi in poor weather while climbing to 2,400 m (7,900 ft) from 300 m (980 ft), killing all 14 on board. The accident was attributed to ATC errors.
18 April 1986
An Aeroflot Yak-40 (CCCP-87236) was written off at Kazan Airport after structural damage was found on the pylons of engines one and three.
18 April 1986
An Aeroflot Yak-40 (CCCP-87301) veered off the runway on landing at Chita Airport after the right main landing gear failed due to fatigue; all 32 on board survived.
April 1986
A Bakhtar Afghan Airlines Yak-40 (YA-KAF) overran the runway on takeoff at Qala i Naw Airport, damaging the nosegear; no casualties. The aircraft was written off as it was deemed not repairable.
17 May 1986
An Aeroflot Yak-40 (CCCP-87928) crashed in the Ob River floodplain (11 mi from Khanty-Mansiysk Airport) after a wing separated during a test flight, killing all five on board. The aircraft was being test-flown following repairs from an incident on 18 April 1986.
16 January 1987
Aeroflot Flight U-505, a Yak-40, crashed on takeoff from Yuzhny Airport after encountering a wake vortex from an Ilyushin Il-76 that had taken off a minute before, killing all nine on board.
25 January 1987
An Aeroflot Yak-40 (CCCP-87696) veered off the runway on takeoff from Tarnogsky Gorodok Airport when the nosegear steering failed; all 25 on board survived.
19 June 1987
Aeroflot Flight N-528, a Yak-40 (CCCP-87826), overran the runway on landing at Berdyansk Airport following an aborted go-around in heavy rain and a tailwind, killing eight of 29 on board.
8 January 1988
A TAAG Angola Airlines Yak-40K (D2-TYD) overran the runway on landing at Luanda Airport; no casualties.
24 January 1988
Aeroflot Flight 29674, a Yak-40 (CCCP-87549) experienced failure of number 1 and 3 engines during take-off from Nizhnevartovsk Airport. Engine number 2 also experienced some problems, but recovered while engines one and three eventually failed. The plane stalled, crashed and broke up, killing 27 of 31 on board. Cause was possible crew error.
2 August 1988
At Sofia Airport, a Hemus Air Yak-40 (LZ-DOK) crashed on take-off. All civil traffic had been halted minutes before because of the departure of Bulgarian leader Todor Zhivkov's Tupolev Tu-154. After the delay, air traffic control cleared LZ-DOK for take-off to Varna, asking the crew to expedite their departure. Trying to leave in a hurry, the crew did not set the trim correctly and began their take-off run from the middle of the 3000 m runway. The aircraft failed to become airborne, overran the runway into a ravine and caught fire, killing 29 of 37 on board. The "black box" of the airplane was never found.
26 May 1989
A CSA Yak-40 was hijacked by a man armed with a fake grenade and demanded to be taken to western Europe. A security guard overpowered the hijacker and the aircraft landed at Karlovy Vary without incident. The hijacker was sentenced to 13 years in prison.
31 July 1989
An Ariana Afghan Airlines Yak-40 (YA-KAA) crashed on landing at Qala i Naw Airport; all 20 on board survived.

== 1990s ==
1 August 1990
Aeroflot Flight E-35D, a Yak-40 (CCCP-87453) traveling from Zvartnots Airport, Armenian SSR to Stepanakert Airport struck a mountain 22 km (14 mi) away from its destination killing all 46 on board. The cause was probably pilot error (premature descent).
9 September 1990
An Aeroflot Yak-40K (CCCP-87914) ran off the runway on landing at Pavlodar Airport and struck Yak-40 CCCP-87451, splitting it in two and tearing off the right wing; both aircraft were written off.
5 October 1990
An Aeroflot Yak-40 was hijacked and diverted to Helsinki; the hijacker threatened to blow up the aircraft if his demands weren't met. Upon landing the hijacker surrendered and requested political asylum, but this was denied and he was extradited back to the USSR two months later.
24 October 1990
Cubana Flight 2886, a Yak-40S2 (CU-T1202), struck mountainous terrain while attempting to land at Antonio Maceo Airport following two aborted approaches, killing 11 of 31 on board.
30 November 1990
An Aeroflot Yak-40 (CCCP-87394) overran the runway on landing at Dikson Airport after landing with a tailwind with excessive speed; all 35 on board survived.
11 December 1990
A man attempted to hijack an Aeroflot Yak-40 to Turkey, but his attempt was foiled when the aircraft landed at Tbilisi instead, ostensibly to refuel and was arrested on landing. Despite his threat to blow the plane up with a bomb, no explosives were found.
1991
An Aeroflot Yak-40 (CCCP-87533) suffered nosegear failure after landing hard at Bykovo Airport; there were no casualties, but the aircraft was written off.
7 November 1991
Yugavia Flight S-519, a Yak-40 (CCCP-87526), struck Kukurtbash Mountain (14 mi north-northwest of Makhachkala Airport) in poor visibility, killing all 51 on board; the aircraft was overloaded and was designed to carry 32 passengers, not 47.
30 December 1991
An Aeroflot Yak-40 (CCCP-87521) crashed on takeoff from Velsk Airport in crosswinds and blowing snow; all 25 on board survived. The aircraft was also overloaded.
27 March 1992
An Aeroflot Armenia Yak-40 with 30 passengers and four crew, on an evacuation mission from Stepanakert to Yerevan, was hit after take-off by a MANPADS (reported by a source to be an SA-7) launched by Azeri forces. The missiles damaged one of the plane's engines and —there are conflicting reports— either forced the pilots to land at Sisian (on Armenian-controlled territory) or made it to Yerevan.
9 May 1992
An Ararat Avia Yak-40 (CCCP-87532) on an evacuation mission from Stepanakert to Yerevan with 30 passengers (refugees and wounded) and three crew, was attacked above Kalbajar District (a now Armenian-occupied part of Azerbaijan) by gunfire from an Azeri Sukhoi Su-25 flown by Vagif (or Vaghit) Kurbanov, an Azeri pilot that had defected with his aircraft a month earlier from Russian forces stationed at Sitalchay. The crew managed to make a gear up land at Sisian airfield. Everyone survived but the plane was written off.
1 August 1992
An Ariana Afghan Airlines Yak-40 (YA-KAB) was destroyed during a mortar attack at Kabul Airport.
14 September 1992
A Yakutavia Yak-40 (CCCP-87411) suffered severe damage on climbout from Neryungri Airport following a fire in engine number three; the aircraft is able to return to the airport where it landed safely.
14 November 1992
Vietnam Airlines Flight 474, a Yak-40 flying from Ho Chi Minh City-Tan Son Nhat International Airport to the previously civilian Nha Trang Airport descended too low on approach, struck trees and crashed in bad weather killing all but one passenger.
17 May 1993
An Aeroflot Yak-40 (RA-88244) ran off the runway on landing at Khanty-Mansiysk Airport after the landing gear collapsed; all 22 on board survived. The aircraft was repaired and returned to service.
28 August 1993
During the Tajikistani Civil War, a Tajik Air Yak-40 (87995) operating a non-scheduled flight that was grossly overloaded with 81 passengers and five crew members overran the runway on takeoff at Khorog Airport and crashed into the Panj River. The crew were killed and only four passengers survived. During boarding, militants controlling the adjacent area threatened the crew into taking 81 passengers (the aircraft was designed to carry only 28) and was then forced at gunpoint to take off. This is the deadliest accident involving a Yak-40 as well as the deadliest accident in Tajikistan.
25 February 1994
Expresso Aéreo Flight 028, a Yak-40 (OB-1559), piloted by two Russians and one Peruvian, struck Mount Carpish six minutes after leaving Tingo María, Peru for Lima. The 31 occupants were killed.
26 September 1994
A Cheremshanka Airlines Yak-40 (RA-87468) from Krasnoyarsk Airport, Russia to Tura was unable to land at Tura because of bad weather so was diverted to Vanavara. It ran out of fuel due to crew and ATC errors and crashed while attempting an emergency landing on a river, 41 km (25 mi) from Vanavara. All 28 passengers and crew were killed.
27 October 1994
Rostov Air Enterprise (Donavia) Flight 156, a Yak-40 (RA-88254) was hijacked on October 25 while en route to Rostov from Ashgabad by one man claiming to have a bomb. After reporting the incident the pilot returned to Makhachkala. The hijacker demanded 2 million US dollars and to be flown to Iran. The aircraft landed and some passengers were released, but more hostages were not released until the next afternoon on October 26. By that evening all passengers were released, leaving the hijacker and some of the crew on board. Shortly after midnight on October 27, they too were released. Just before sunrise, as the aircraft was about to be stormed by security forces, the hijacker blew himself up with a homemade bomb. The blast damaged the plane, and it was written off.
5 November 1994
Servicios Aéreos Amazónicos Flight 2079, (reg. OB-1569), serving the Trujillo-Saposoa-Juanjuí-Tocache-Lima schedule, crashed into the Saposoa river after overrunning the airstrip during landing. The aircraft reportedly crashed due to the Ukrainian instructor pilot's decision to land despite heavy rain and poor visual conditions reported at the time, which led the aircraft to touch down halfway through the wet runway, which deprived it of enough space to brake, leading to the accident. Reportedly, the pilot's conflict with the Peruvian student copilot over the decision to land would have been a contributing factor, as the latter claimed to have tried to abort the landing at the last moment. Of the 31 occupants (26 passengers and 5 crew), 5 passengers and the pilot died.
14 January 1995
While landing at Tobolsk Airport, a Chelyabinsk Airlines Yak-40 (RA-87565) steered off the runway and crashed into the fence surrounding the airport. The crew feared that the aircraft would overrun the runway and crash into an embankment and steered the aircraft off the runway; the aircraft had not slowed down enough due to thrust reverser problems. All five on board survived and the aircraft was repaired and returned to service.
25 January 1995
A Volga Airlines Yak-40 (RA-87464) overran the runway on landing at Rostov Airport and crashed into a concrete fence; all ten on board survived. The aircraft had landed with the number two engine operating in forward thrust instead of reverse thrust due to crew errors.
13 April 1995
A Kazakhstan Airlines Yak-40K (UN-88181) ran off the runway on landing at Dzhambul Airport in severe crosswinds; the aircraft then struck a concrete pit cover, breaking off the right side landing gear; all 31 on board survived. An electrical cable for the nosegear steering mechanism had failed before landing.
28 June 1996
A Samorodok Air Company (leased from Sakha Avia) Yak-40 (RA-87423) landed nosegear first with a load of 4 g and bounced several times, collapsing the nose gear; all 11 on board survived. The aircraft had deviated from the glide path on final approach following failure of engine number two.
25 July 1996
A Weasua Air Transport (leased from NovgorodAvia) Yak-40 (RA-87573) landed short of the runway at Sprigg Payne Airport after encountering windshear on final approach; the aircraft then struck the runway edge, breaking off the left landing gear and then slid for 300 m (980 ft); all 11 on board survived.
26 October 1996
While on approach to Mansiysk Airport, the crew of Tyumenaviatrans Yak-40 RA-88257 mistook the helicopter parking area perimeter lights for the runway approach lights. On landing the aircraft struck 4 Mi-8T helicopters, killing five of 37 on board.
6 December 1996
A Krasnoyarsk Airlines Yak-40 was hijacked by a man who wanted to go to the Netherlands. The hijacker was overpowered and the aircraft continued to Boguchany where the hijacker was arrested.
1996
Two Weasua Air Transport Yak-40s (RA-87290 and RA-87999) were destroyed on the ground at Sprigg Payne Airport after being struck by RPG-7 anti-tank rockets during the First Liberian Civil War.
29 January 1997
Krasnoyarsk Airlines Flight 160, a Yak-40 (RA-87752) crashed in taiga near Shushenskoye, Russia due to pilot error; all 27 on board survived.
19 February 1997
A Semeyavia Yakovlev Yak-40 (UN-87233) overshot the runway on landing at Semey Airport, Kazakhstan following a scheduled domestic passenger flight. There were no fatalities among the 14 passengers and four crew members on board, but the aircraft was damaged beyond repair.
15 May 1997
An Azerbaijan Airlines Yak-40 (4K-87504) crashed near Gyandzha Airport during a training flight, killing all six on board. Stray small-arms fire from Azerbaijani soldiers on the ground struck an oxygen cylinder on the Yak-40, starting a fire. Control was lost and the aircraft crashed.
29 October 1997
An Ariana Afghan Airlines Yak-40 (YA-KAE) crashed on landing at Jalalabad Airport, killing one.
May 25, 1998
A Lao Aviation Yak-40 (RDPL-34001) crashed in a jungle near Long Tieng, Xiangkhouang in heavy rain, killing all 26 on board.
August 26, 1999
An Uzbekistan Airways Yak-40 (UK-87848) struck power lines during its second approach to Turtkul Airport; the aircraft landed wheels-up and slid for nearly 500 feet before it hit an embankment, killing two of 33 on board.

== 2000s ==
March 9, 2000
Vologda Aviation Enterprise Flight 9651, a Yak-40 (RA-88170), stalled and crashed shortly after takeoff from Sheremetyevo Airport due to wing icing and crew error, killing all nine on board. The aircraft was operating a charter flight to Kyiv for Aeroteks.
2000
An Ecuato Guineana de Aviación Yak-40 (RA-87847) was written off after its tail was hit by a taxiing Swissair MD-11 at Santa Isabel Airport in Malabo, Equatorial Guinea. The aircraft was leased from NovgorodAvia; the accident occurred sometime after July 2000.
May 17, 2001
A Faraz Qeshm Airlines flight departed Tehran heading for Gorgan Airport carrying 30 people, including the Iranian Transport Minister Rahman Dadman, two deputy ministers and seven more members of parliament was forced to divert due to bad weather conditions and was later discovered crashed into the Elburz mountains, Iran. All on board perished.
January 6, 2003
Belavia Flight 861, a Yak-40 (EW-88161) suffered a shattered windshield en route to Prague. Two Czech Air Force fighters accompanied the plane to a safe landing in Ruzyně International Airport.
April 28, 2003
A Dniproavia Yak-40 (UR-87918) ran off the runway after a hard landing at Dnipropetrovsk International Airport following a scheduled domestic flight. The aircraft came to a rest 100 metres away from the runway and was substantially damaged. There were no fatal injuries amongst the 13 passengers and four crew members on board.
January 13, 2004
Uzbekistan Airways Flight 1154, a Yak-40 (UK-87985) from Termez Airport to Tashkent International Airport carrying 37 passengers and crew, crashed; the crew failed to descend for approach on time. Finding the runway too short to land, a go-around was attempted but failed. The plane touched down beyond the end of the runway and the left wing struck a concrete building, with the subsequent crash and fire killing all on board.
July 19, 2005
An Interisland Airlines Yak-40 (RP-C2803) was damaged beyond repair when it touched down short of the runway at Godofredo P. Ramos Airport after a flight from Ninoy Aquino International Airport. There were no injuries.
November 2, 2006
An Interisland Airlines Yak-40A (RP-C2695) suffered a blown left landing gear tire on landing at Malay Airport. The Yak-40 began drifting left towards a DHC-7, but the crew managed to avoid it; however, the Yak-40 left the runway in the process. All three crew on board survived.

== 2010s ==
January 31, 2010
Guicango Yakovlev Yak-40 D2-FES suffered the collapse of all landing gears on landing after a flight from Cabinda.
March 17, 2011
Two Air Libya Yak-40s (5A-DKG, 5A-DKM) along with an Air Libya Boeing 737 were written off following attacks at Benina International Airport during the First Libyan Civil War.
May 26, 2014
A Constanta Yak-40 (UR-MMK) was damaged while parked at Donetsk Airport during the First Battle of Donetsk Airport and burned out.
February 18, 2015
A BPV Group Yak-40 (UR-MIG) was struck by an out-of-control Antonov An-26B (EW-246TG) that was performing an engine test at Boryspil Airport.
July 9, 2018
An AeroBratsk Yak-40 (RA-87397) overran the runway on landing at Aldan Airport; the aircraft suffered minor damage and all 25 on board were uninjured.
