= Huallaga =

Huallaga may refer to:

- Locations in Peru:
  - Huallaga Province
  - Huallaga River
  - Huallaga Valley
