= Elista (disambiguation) =

Elista is the capital city of the Republic of Kalmykia, Russia.

Elista may also refer to:

- Elista Urban Okrug, a municipal formation which the City of Elista in the Republic of Kalmykia, Russia is incorporated as
- Elista Airport, an airport in the Republic of Kalmykia, Russia
- FC Elista, a defunct association football club from Elista in the Republic of Kalmykia, Russia, which was active in 2005–2006
