= Tingo de Saposoa District =

Coordinates: 7.0925°S 76.6410°W

Tingo de Saposoa
- District
- Interactive map of Tingo de Saposoa
- Country: Peru
- Region: San Martín
- Province: Huallaga
- Founded: May 8, 1936
- Capital: Tingo de Saposoa

Government
  - Mayor: Francisco Yalta Mego

Area
  - Total: 37.29 km^{2} (14.40 sq mi)
- Elevation: 250 m (820 ft)

Population (2005 census)
  - Total: 847
  - Density: 22.7/km^{2} (58.8/sq mi)
- Time zone: UTC-5 (PET)
- UBIGEO: 220406

Tingo de Saposoa District is one of six districts of the province Huallaga in Peru.
