= Sacanche District =

Coordinates: 7.0815°S 76.7046°W

- District
- Interactive map of Sacanche District
- Country: Peru
- Region: San Martín
- Province: Huallaga
- Founded: May 20, 1936
- Capital: Sacanche

Government
  - Mayor: Edgar Fonseca Del Castillo

Area
  - Total: 143.15 km^{2} (55.27 sq mi)
- Elevation: 272 m (892 ft)

Population (2005 census)
  - Total: 2,967
  - Density: 20.73/km^{2} (53.68/sq mi)
- Time zone: UTC-5 (PET)
- UBIGEO: 220405

Sacanche District is one of six districts of the province Huallaga in Peru.
