= Saposoa District =

Coordinates: 6.9335°S 76.7721°W

- District
- Interactive map of Saposoa District
- Country: Peru
- Region: San Martín
- Province: Huallaga
- Capital: Saposoa

Government
  - Mayor: Fernando Grandez Veintemilla

Area
  - Total: 545.43 km^{2} (210.59 sq mi)
- Elevation: 307 m (1,007 ft)

Population (2005 census)
  - Total: 10,806
  - Density: 19.812/km^{2} (51.313/sq mi)
- Time zone: UTC-5 (PET)
- UBIGEO: 220401

Saposoa District is one of six districts of the province Huallaga in Peru.

== Climate ==
Climate data for Saposoa, elevation 307 m (1,007 ft), (1991–2020)
Month	Jan	Feb	Mar	Apr	May	Jun	Jul	Aug	Sep	Oct	Nov	Dec	Year
Mean daily maximum °C (°F)	33.0 (91.4)	32.3 (90.1)	31.8 (89.2)	31.8 (89.2)	31.7 (89.1)	31.5 (88.7)	31.7 (89.1)	33.0 (91.4)	33.1 (91.6)	33.4 (92.1)	33.1 (91.6)	32.6 (90.7)	32.4 (90.4)
Mean daily minimum °C (°F)	22.3 (72.1)	22.4 (72.3)	22.3 (72.1)	22.1 (71.8)	21.9 (71.4)	21.1 (70.0)	20.3 (68.5)	20.2 (68.4)	20.8 (69.4)	21.9 (71.4)	22.5 (72.5)	22.5 (72.5)	21.7 (71.0)
Average precipitation mm (inches)	103.7 (4.08)	148.3 (5.84)	171.2 (6.74)	146.6 (5.77)	98.6 (3.88)	82.9 (3.26)	67.5 (2.66)	68.6 (2.70)	89.2 (3.51)	129.2 (5.09)	151.8 (5.98)	136.6 (5.38)	1,394.2 (54.89)
Source: National Meteorology and Hydrology Service of Peru
