= 2001 Faraz Qeshm Airlines Yak-40 crash =

Plane crash in northern Iran

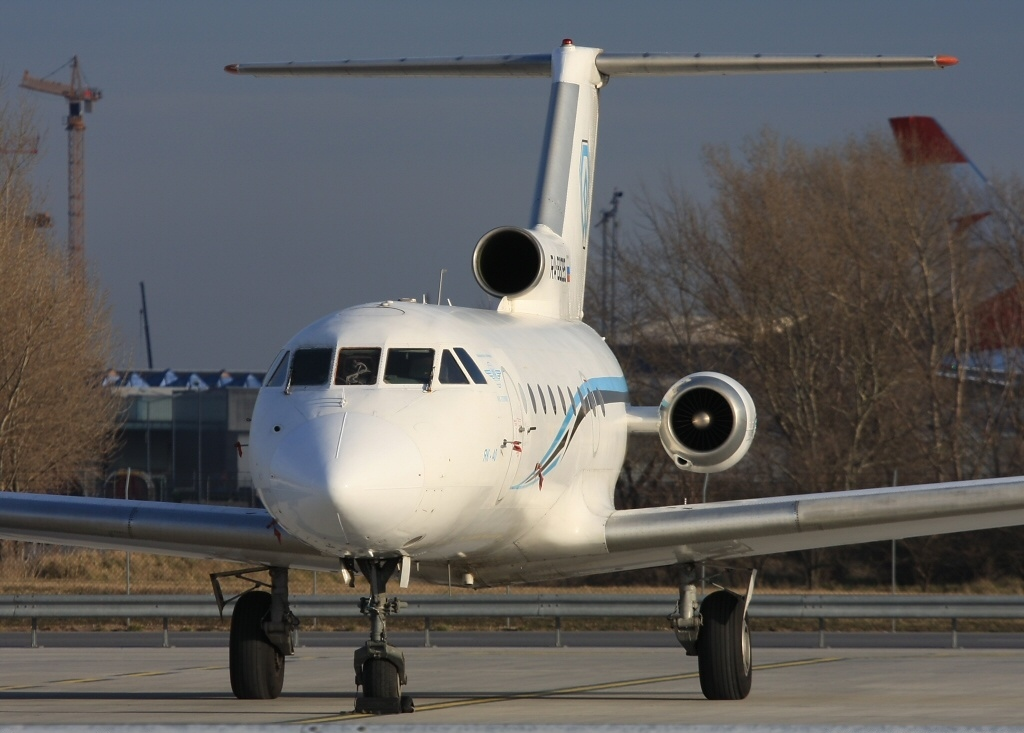
- A Yak-40, similar to the one involved.

Accident
- Date: 17 May 2001
- Summary: Crashed into terrain in poor weather
- Site: Alborz Mountains, Iran; 36°26′24.7″N 53°12′26.4″E

Aircraft
- Aircraft type: Yakovlev Yak-40
- Operator: Faraz Qeshm Airlines
- Registration: EP-TQP
- Flight origin: Tehran-Mehrabad Airport (THR/OIII), Iran
- Destination: Gorgan Airport (GBT/OING), Iran
- Occupants: 30
- Passengers: 25
- Crew: 5
- Fatalities: 30
- Survivors: 0

The 2001 Faraz Qeshm Airlines Yak-40 crash occurred on 17 May 2001 when a short-haul trijet Yakovlev Yak-40 being operated by Faraz Qeshm Airlines crashed while en route to Gorgan Airport from Tehran-Mehrabad Airport in Iran. The aircraft crashed in mountainous terrain while flying in poor weather conditions about twenty kilometers south of Sari killing all thirty people on board. Passengers aboard the aircraft included Rahman Dadman, Iran's Minister of Roads and Transportation, and six members of parliament.

== Aircraft and crew ==
The Yakovlev Yak-40 operated by Faraz Qeshm Airlines was on lease from Armenian Airlines and the crew, including both pilots, consisted of Armenian nationals.

== Accident ==
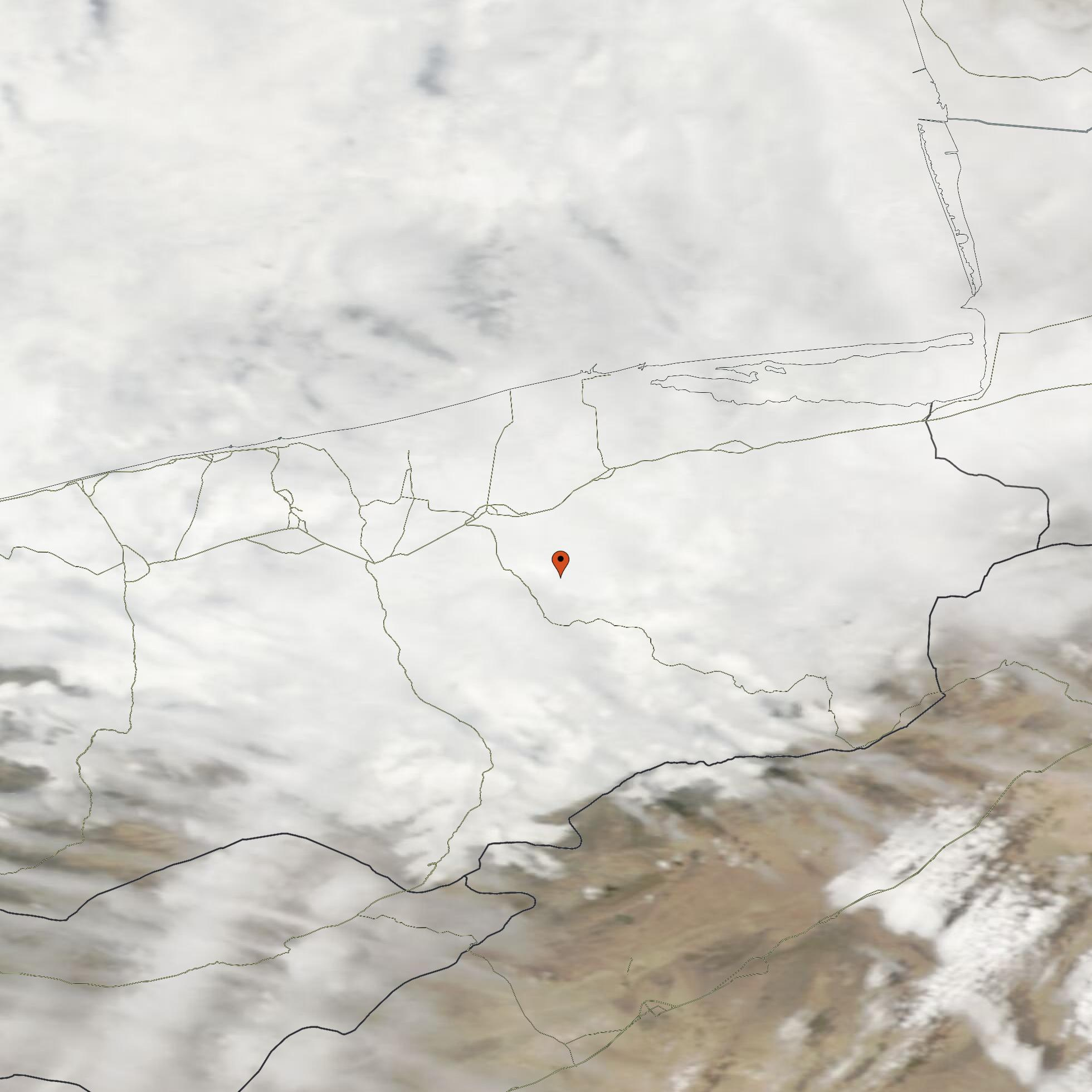
Weather conditions of the Alborz Mountains on the day of the crash (crash site pinpointed)

On 17 May 2001, a Russian-built Yakovlev Yak-40, registration EP-TQP, operated by Faraz Qeshm Airlines took off from Tehran-Mehrabad Airport at 06:45 and proceeded northeast to Gorgan Airport with a crew of five and twenty-five passengers which included Iran's Transportation Minister Rahman Dadman, other ministry staff, including Arsalan Raahemi and six members of parliament. They were part of a delegation to inaugurate the opening of Gorgan Airport, according to Golestan province Governor Ali Asghar Ahmadi.

While flying in deteriorating weather conditions, which included heavy rain, the aircraft was struck by lightning possibly affecting its navigational equipment. About ten minutes before its scheduled arrival, the pilot communicated to air traffic control that they would either have to make an emergency landing or divert to another airport. At around 07:45 the aircraft crashed in a heavily forested section of the Alborz Mountains, thirteen miles southeast of the city of Sari, between Gorgan and Shahroud.

== Passengers and crew ==
All of the passengers aboard the aircraft were Iranian nationals. The crew members were Armenian nationals from Armenian Airlines.

Nationality	Passengers	Crew	Total
Armenia	0	5	5
Iran	25	0	25
Total	25	5	30

== See also ==
- Aeromist-Kharkiv Flight 2137
- Iran Air Flight 291
- Iran Air Flight 742
- Sepahan Airlines Flight 5915
