= Aeroflot Flight E-35D =

August 1990 aviation accident in the Soviet Union

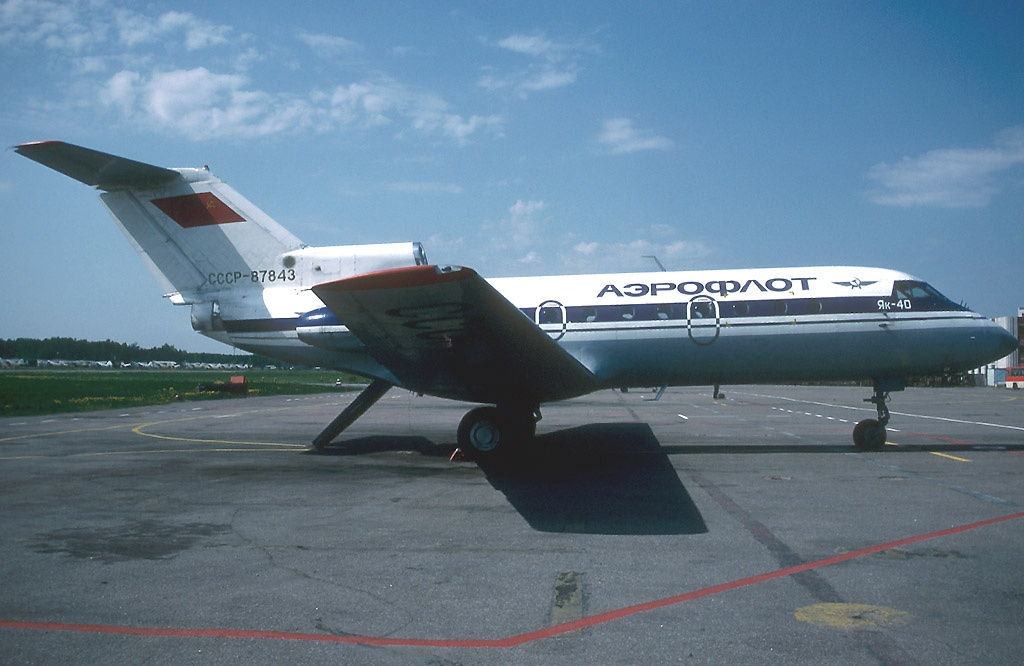
- An Aeroflot Yak-40 similar to the one involved

Accident
- Date: 1 August 1990
- Summary: Controlled flight into terrain due to pilot error and ATC error
- Site: Karabakh Range, northwest of Stepanakert Airport, Stepanakert, Nagorno-Karabakh, Azerbaijan SSR

Aircraft
- Aircraft type: Yakovlev Yak-40
- Operator: Aeroflot
- Registration: CCCP-87453
- Flight origin: Erebuni Airport, Yerevan, Armenian SSR
- Destination: Stepanakert Airport, Stepanakert, Nagorno-Karabakh, Azerbaijan SSR
- Occupants: 46
- Passengers: 43
- Crew: 3
- Fatalities: 46
- Survivors: 0

Aeroflot Flight E-35D was a scheduled passenger flight from Yerevan, Armenia SSR to Stepanakert, Azerbaijan SSR. On 1 August 1990, the Yak-40 crashed into the Karabakh Range while approaching to the Stepanakert Airport, killing all 46 occupants.

As of August 2026, this is the third largest disaster of the Yakovlev Yak-40 (behind Yugavia Flight S-519 and 1993 Tajikistan Airlines Yakovlev Yak-40 crash). The crash was controversial as with conflicting statements and results during the Nagorno-Karabakh conflict.

== Background ==
=== Aircraft ===
The aircraft involved was a Yakovlev Yak-40 manufactured on September 9, 1974 and registered as CCCP-87453. The aircraft was operated by the 2nd Yerevan Detachment (now Armavia), a unit of Aeroflot at that time.

=== Crew ===
The flight consisted of three crew members:

- Captain: Ararat L. Dallakyan,
- Co-pilot: Alexander Hovhannisyan,
- Flight Mechanic: Zhora Davtyan

=== Passengers ===
On board of the flight were 43 passengers, but 13 passengers were unregistered and illegally entered the plane. This violated the rules and caused the plane to be overweighted.

== Accident ==
The flight took off from Erebuni Airport at 09:41 local time and reached to the altitude of 4,500 meters (14,760 feet). At 09:47, the ATC stated that the distance between the aircraft's position and the departure airport was 20 kilometers, but the captain estimated that they were 35 kilometers; even so, they decided to ignore the estimation and relied on the ATC calculations. The crew then made four consecutive turn. Due to the miscalculations, the plane deviated from Andranik by 2 kilometers to the left at 09:49, and Azizbekov by 4 kilometers to the left at 09:55.

At 09:59, 21 km after passing the Azizbekov airfield, the crew transferred control to the Kapan Airport controller. The controller instructed them to maintain an altitude of 4,500 meters (14,760 feet) until the descent point until the Lachin's beam. The controller did not observe the aircraft or inform the crew of the distance to the airport, and the crew, in turn, did not report the estimated time of flight Lachin's beam, nor did they specify their location. The captain began to doubt his estimation for his aircraft's position.

At the altitude of 3,616 meters (11,860 feet), he mistook it for 2,823 meters (9,260 feet) and reported his estimated start of descent. Clearance was given to 3,900 meters (12,800 feet) high of the Lachin's beam. Since the controllers did not observe the flight, the plane descended passed the safe altitude.

The crew switched communications to the Stepanakert controller. The crew misreported to be at 3,900 meters (12,800 feet). For a short approach, the crew changed heading to 75 degrees for the non-directional beacon and requested descent to 2,400 meters (7,875 feet); however, they were only authorized to descent to 3,000 meters (9,840 feet). As they descended, the plane collided with a rocky mountain slope at an altitude of 2,520 meters (8,270 feet) with a speed of 410-415 km/h (221-224 knots). All 46 occupants were killed.

Communications of the aircraft was lost, and the controller tried to re-connect the flight from other flights. Misha Andresyan, a pilot at that time, recollected: "When I was approaching Stepanakert, a controller asked me to try to contact Dallakyan, as their attempts produced no result. I did succeed either. When I landed, we waited for several more hours but to no avail. Then we learned that the plane crashed. We thought it was shot down."

Eyewitness of the crash stated that the plane looked overloaded, as the plane was designed to carry 32 passengers, not over 40.

Misha Andresyan also admitted: "Although Yak-40 was had 36 passenger seats, we were transporting more people, calling them “secondary passengers”. We didn’t count their weight, as well as the amount of the fuel we were short of. We fueled the tank just enough to reach the destination, not more. Upon landing in Stepanakert, we game the remaining fuel to the locals, who needed it badly."

== Investigation ==
It was concluded that the accident was caused by a combination of the following factors:

- The captain's violations of the flight rules set forth in the policy documents manifested in unsatisfactory navigation, straightening the route and premature unauthorized descent to a height below the minimum safety altitude, which resulted in a collision with a mountain.
- Violations of ATC rules in their zones by ATC dispatchers of Erebuni, Kafan and Stepanakert airports, expressed in failure to comply with the rules of air traffic control and non-interference in the actions of the crew who violated the rules of navigation and flight regime, which did not allow timely prevention of the aircraft collision with an obstacle. The dispatchers at Yerevan-Stepanakert have a stereotype of work: to allow those conditions of approach, which the crews requested. These violations became possible due to shortcomings in the organization of flight work, flights and air traffic control at the Yerevan-Stepanakert MVL of the Armenian and Azerbaijani State Administration.

== Controversies ==
During the time of the accident, Armenia and Azerbaijan was involved in the Nagorno-Karabakh conflict. The investigation was conducted by the USSR State Aviation Inspectorate in cooperation with Azerbaijani representatives. The Azerbaijani representatives stated that the black box was sent and deciphered to come to the conclusion of the crash. However, the Armenian side claimed to have found the black boxes on August 6 lying near the wreckage, causing them to doubt the integrity of the investigation.

Because of that, the Armenian raised suspicion of a shot down. Seyran Vantsyan, one of the founders of Armenia’s civil aviation, stated: "At that time no one believed that the plane crashed due to the pilot’s error. We were sure it was an Azeri attack. Many years have passed and I don’t remember everything in detail now, but I think that the plane hit the mountain after being shot."

He also ruled out the overloading theories, stated: "The aircraft wasn’t overloaded; otherwise it could not cover about 200 kilometers from Yerevan to Stepnakert. You should also remember that even if the number of passengers exceeded the norm, some of them were children, who could not be a big surplus to the flight weight."

Karen, the captain's son, also expressed disbelief in the crash, stated: "My father was a very experienced pilot, who served as an example for his friends and colleagues. The graduates of the flight school were allowed to fly only after passing the exam he administered. The co-pilot was no less experienced.". He even said: "When one of my father’s colleagues came to tell us that his plane crashed after hitting a rock, no one believed. However, this version was prompted at the highest level, so everyone had to repeat it. The condition of the engine also proved that the plane was shot down. But the engine disappeared some time later. Besides, they said that a shepherd found the record boxes and damaged the tape, which sounded absurd, as the record box is a hermetically sealed device and the tape doesn’t melt even at high temperature."
