= Piscoyacu District =

Coordinates: 6.9809°S 76.7689°W

Piscoyacu Pisquyaku
- District
- Interactive map of Piscoyacu; Pisquyaku
- Country: Peru
- Region: San Martín
- Province: Huallaga
- Founded: June 14, 1940
- Capital: Piscoyacu

Government
  - Mayor: Juan Delgado Talledo

Area
  - Total: 184.87 km^{2} (71.38 sq mi)
- Elevation: 301 m (988 ft)

Population (2005 census)
  - Total: 3,688
  - Density: 19.95/km^{2} (51.67/sq mi)
- Time zone: UTC-5 (PET)
- UBIGEO: 220404

Piscoyacu District is one of six districts of the province Huallaga in Peru.
