= Yugavia Flight S-519 =

November 1991 plane crash in Makhachkala, Dagestan, Russia

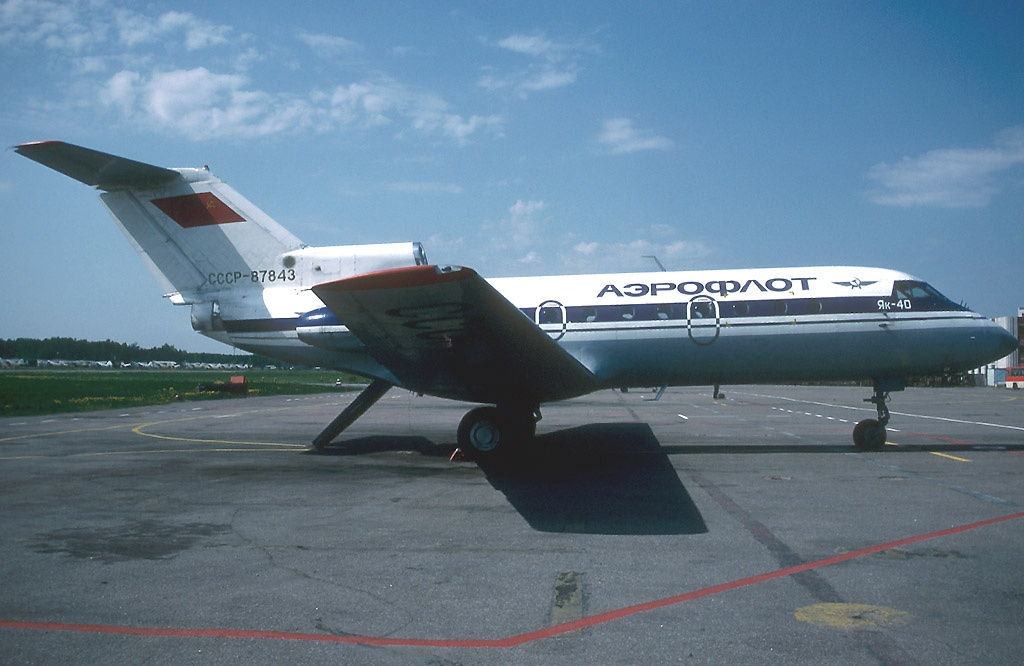
- An Aeroflot Yakovlev Yak-40, similar to the accident aircraft

Accident
- Date: November 7, 1991
- Summary: Controlled flight into terrain (crashed into a mountain) due to ATC and pilot error
- Site: Mt. Kukurtbash, Makhachkala, Dagestan, Soviet Union 42°53′N 47°25′E

Aircraft
- Aircraft type: Yakovlev Yak-40
- Operator: Elista Airline, North Caucasus UGA, Aeroflot-Yugavia
- Registration: CCCP-87526
- Flight origin: Elista International Airport, Elista, Kalmykia, Russia
- Destination: Makhachkala International Airport "Uytash", Makhachkala, Dagestan, Russia
- Occupants: 51
- Passengers: 47
- Crew: 4
- Fatalities: 51
- Survivors: 0

Yugavia Flight S-519 (aka Aeroflot-Yugavia Flight 519) was a Russian domestic flight from Elista to Makhachkala. On the afternoon of November 7, 1991, the plane crashed into the side of Mt. Kukurtbash, 23 km (14 miles) from the Makhachkala Airport, killing all 51 people on board. This flight was the deadliest aviation accident involving a Yakovlev Yak-40 at the time, and remains the second-deadliest Yak-40 accident to this day.

== Plane and people ==
=== Aircraft ===
The aircraft involved in the accident was a Yakovlev Yak-40, registered as CCCP-87526. It was manufactured in 1975, making it about 16 years old at the time of the crash. The Yak-40 (manufacturer's number 9520841, serial number 41-08) was produced by the Saratov Aviation Plant in 1975 and handed over to the Ministry of Civil Aviation, which on July 6 directed it to the Elista Aviation Detachment of the North Caucasus Civil Aviation Directorate.

=== Passengers ===
The plane was configured to seat 32 passengers, but 47 were crammed on board. 34 were listed as being on board and 13 boarded illegally; these were 39 adults and 8 children. The plane was 260 kg (573 pounds) above its maximum takeoff weight (MTOW).

=== Flight crew ===
- Captain: Alexander Milshin
- First officer: Alexander Shulepov
- Mechanic: Mir Ochirov
- Flight attendant: B. Tsedenova

== Disaster ==
The aircraft was operating flight C-519 from Elista to Makhachkala, piloted by a crew consisting of Captain Alexander Milshin, co-pilot Alexander Shulepov, and flight engineer Mir Ochirov. The cabin crew included flight attendant B. Tsedenova. Although the cabin had 32 seats, a total of 34 passengers were registered for the flight, and an additional 13 unauthorized passengers were boarded. Thus, there were 47 passengers in total: 39 adults and 8 children. The takeoff weight exceeded the limit by 260 kilograms, but the aircraft's center of gravity remained within permissible limits. At 12:43, the Yak-40 departed from Elista Airport.

The flight was supposed to pass through the OPRS points Aktur, Almar, Ronka, Kizlyar, and then proceed along Flight Corridor 3 to the area for descent to the OPRM for landing. Initially, the captain selected a flight level of 5100 meters, but after passing Aktur at 12:58 and contacting the circle dispatcher (DPK) of sector B1 of the North Caucasus Automated Air Traffic Control System Center (SKTs AS UVD) "Strela," he received permission to climb to the level of 5700 meters, which he reached at 13:01:35, and then continued towards the traverse of Grozny. At 13:01:40, the crew contacted the dispatcher and requested permission to fly off-course directly to Kizlyar, bypassing Ronka. This route straightening would have taken the aircraft out of the North Caucasus center's zone and into the M1 Astrakhan Zone Center of the Unified Air Traffic Management System, requiring coordination between dispatchers. The North Caucasus center dispatcher, likely not wanting to complicate matters, denied the request to head directly to Kizlyar but allowed off-course flight to the Grozny traverse after passing Almar. When flight C-519 passed the Grozny traverse, the dispatcher informed the crew of their position and instructed them to proceed to the OPRS Kizlyar, which was complied with.

At 13:23, the airliner entered sector M1 airspace, so the crew contacted the Astrakhan center dispatcher and reported that they were flying at a level of 5700 meters and provided the estimated time for passing Kizlyar. In response, the dispatcher, violating the Makhachkala Airport Flight Procedures, instructed them to proceed off-course directly to the Makhachkala beacon. The crew knew that this route would involve flying over the mountainous Kanaburu range, but nonetheless, they complied with the instruction, turning towards the Makhachkala beacon after passing Kizlyar.

At 13:34, the airliner descended to the level of 5100 meters, and at a distance of 100 kilometers from Makhachkala airport and 35 kilometers to the right of air corridor No. 3, the crew contacted the approach dispatcher (DPP) and falsely reported entering the airport's zone via air corridor No. 3. The approach dispatcher, although seeing on the long-range radar screen that the aircraft was actually on an unidentified course, did not direct it to the established route and descent pattern and did not inform the pilots of their actual position. Instead, he, in violation of instructions, gave a command to descend to an altitude of 1800 meters at the OPRM along an unestablished descent trajectory, although in this case, the aircraft was descending into a dangerous sector for IFR flights towards a mountain range with heights of 890 and 720 meters. Then, at 13:39, when the airliner was at an altitude of 1800 meters, 45 kilometers from Makhachkala airfield, and 23 kilometers to the right of the route, the approach dispatcher, without coordinating the transfer conditions, instructed the crew to contact the landing dispatcher (DPSP). The crew confirmed the instruction without clarifying their location or moving to the established route.

At 41 kilometers from the airport, the crew contacted the landing dispatcher, who incorrectly identified the aircraft's position as 122° bearing, 36 kilometers away, when the actual position was 118° bearing, 41 kilometers away. The dispatcher also gave permission to descend to an altitude of 1050 meters based on airport pressure and to head to the beacon, even though the minimum altitude in the area beyond the limiting bearing where the aircraft was located was set at 1800 meters by instructions. The crew blindly followed the instruction and soon entered a "blind" zone obscured by mountain peaks, causing the radar blip of the flight to periodically disappear from the radar screen. Without seeing the blip on the screen, the dispatcher at 13:40 gave a presumed location of the aircraft—308° bearing, although the actual bearing was 296°. Two consecutive incorrect messages about the aircraft's location misled the crew and created a false impression that the aircraft was approaching the established flight route. As a result, the crew continued to maintain the previous course, blindly trusting the data provided by the dispatcher and not using all the available on-board flight navigation instruments, which could have indicated that the aircraft was not heading towards the OPRM but into a mountainous area with higher peaks.

At 13:41:41, the crew reported reaching an altitude of 1050 meters, to which the dispatcher instructed to continue the flight to the OPRM. The crew was off the landing course and could not proceed to the marker as the audio and visual signals did not activate. However, at 13:42:16, the crew reported passing the marker, and the dispatcher, without verifying the actual location of the aircraft by radar, at 13:42:24 instructed them to descend to an altitude of 400 meters for the fourth turn in the landing approach with a magnetic course of 143°. The aircraft was not equipped with a Ground Proximity Warning System (GPWS). The sky was covered with continuous clouds, the altitude of which the crew did not know and assumed it to be the same as over the airport—980 meters. They intended to "break through" the cloud layer and transition to visual flight to then build the maneuver for landing.

Without reducing the vertical descent rate, the crew began to turn left to align with the landing course when, just 5 seconds later, at 13:42:56, the aircraft, flying in clouds at an altitude of 550 meters, with a 20° left bank, crashed into the slope of Mount Kukurt-Bash (elevation 894 meters) 23 kilometers west (azimuth 290°) of Makhachkala airport, completely destroying the aircraft. which caught fire. All 4 crew members and 47 passengers on board perished.

== Cause ==
The disaster was the result of gross violations of flight rules and air traffic control regulations in mountainous terrain by the air traffic control personnel and the crew, which led to descent of the aircraft below a safe altitude off the established approach pattern, resulting in a collision with a mountain and the complete destruction of the aircraft.

== See also ==
- List of accidents and incidents involving commercial aircraft
- List of accidents and incidents involving the Yakovlev Yak-40
