= El Eslabón District =

Coordinates: 7.0221°S 76.7234°W

- District
- Interactive map of El Eslabón District
- Country: Peru
- Region: San Martín
- Province: Huallaga
- Founded: October 10, 1963
- Capital: El Eslabón

Government
  - Mayor: Julian Ruiz Vasquez

Area
  - Total: 122.77 km^{2} (47.40 sq mi)
- Elevation: 286 m (938 ft)

Population (2005 census)
  - Total: 1,729
  - Density: 14.08/km^{2} (36.48/sq mi)
- Time zone: UTC-5 (PET)
- UBIGEO: 220403

El Eslabón District is one of six districts of the province Huallaga in Peru.
