= Alto Saposoa District =

Coordinates: 6.7658°S 76.8139°W

Alto Saposoa
- District
- Interactive map of Alto Saposoa
- Country: Peru
- Region: San Martín
- Province: Huallaga
- Founded: September 13, 1963
- Capital: Pasarraya

Government
  - Mayor: Victor Neira Mori

Area
  - Total: 1,347.34 km^{2} (520.21 sq mi)
- Elevation: 420 m (1,380 ft)

Population (2005 census)
  - Total: 2,156
  - Density: 1.600/km^{2} (4.144/sq mi)
- Time zone: UTC-5 (PET)
- UBIGEO: 220402

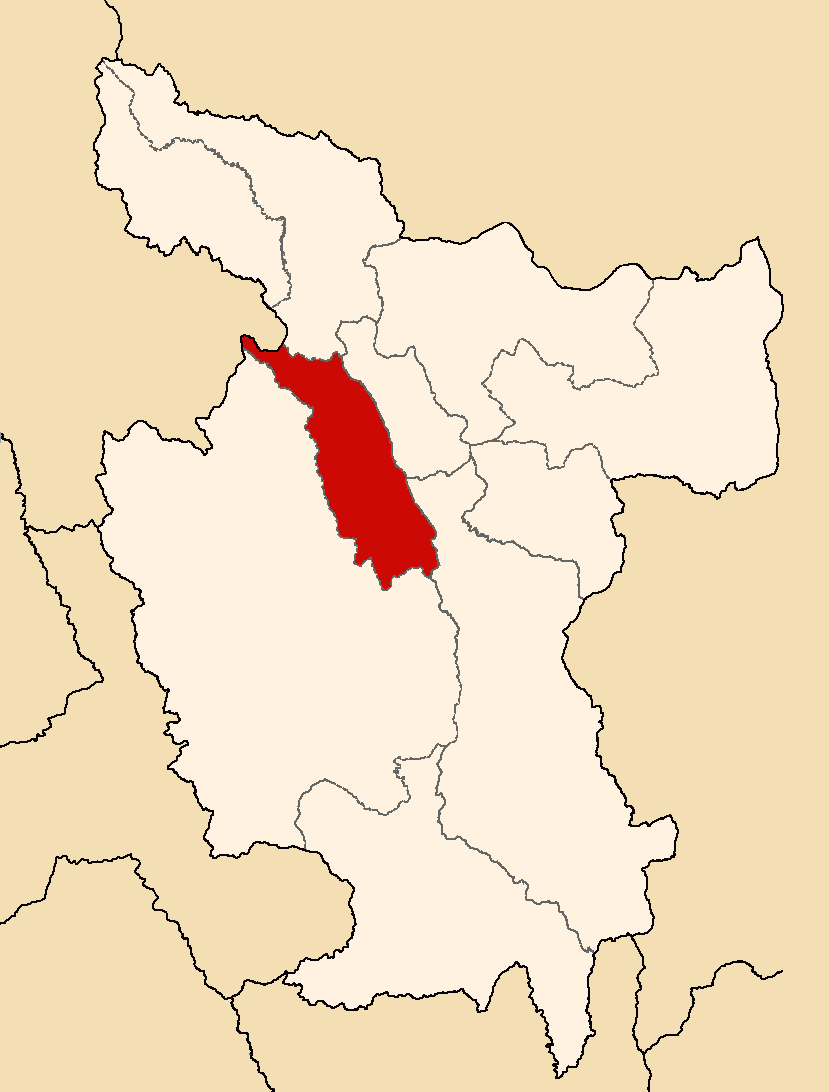

Alto Saposoa District is one of six districts of the province Huallaga in Peru.
