= Gorgan Airport =

Gorgan International Airport
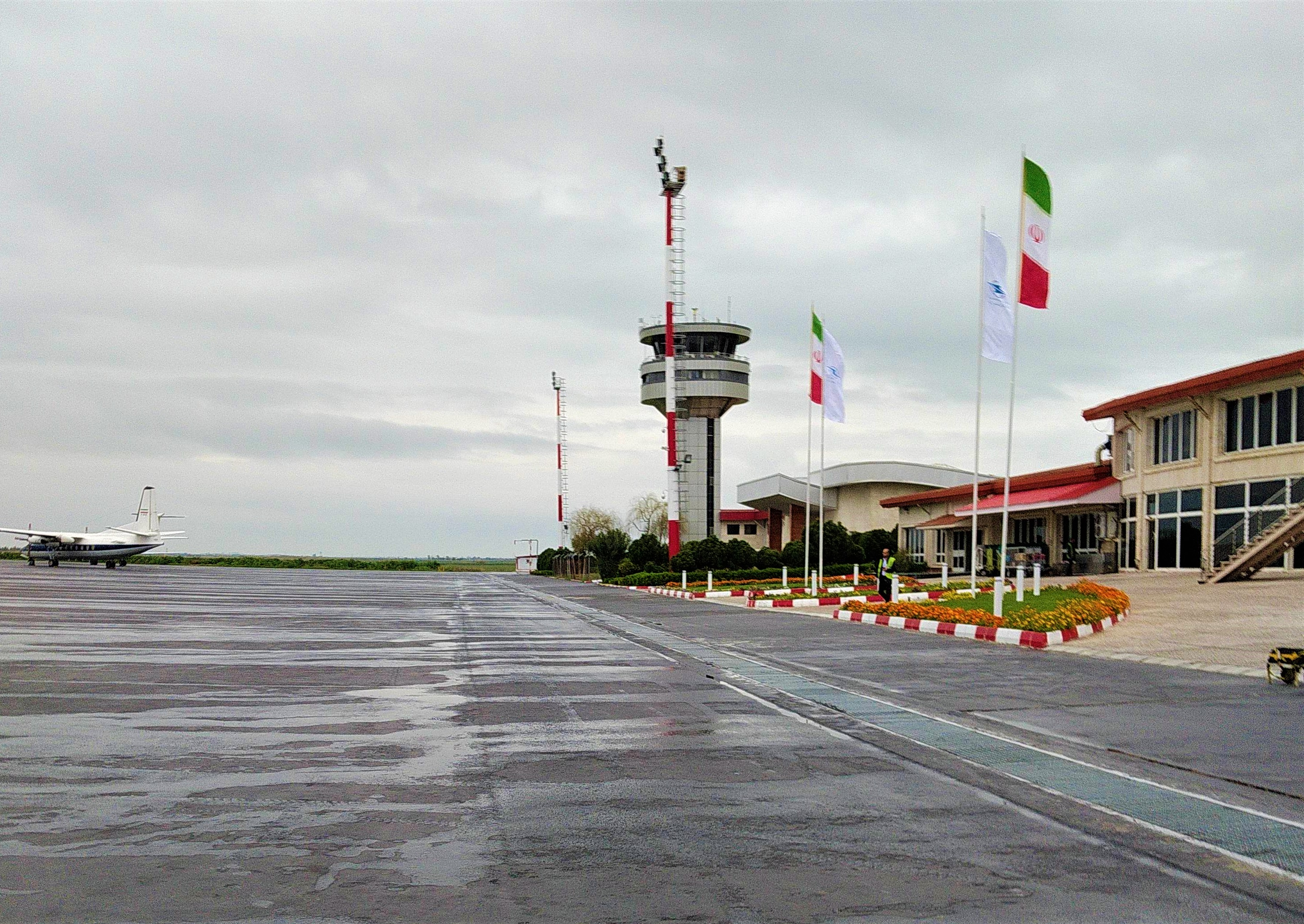
- IATA: GBT; ICAO: OING

Summary
- Airport type: Public
- Owner: Government of Iran
- Operator: Iran Airports Company
- Serves: Gorgan, Golestan
- Location: Gorgan, Iran
- Opened: 2005
- Elevation AMSL: −24 ft (−7.3 m)
- Coordinates: 36°54′33.8″N 54°24′04.8″E
- Website: Gorgan International Airport

Map
- Location of airport in Iran

Runways
Direction	Length		Surface
Direction	ft	m	Surface
14/32	7,540	2,298	Asphalt

Statistics (2017)
- Passengers: 304,735
- Source: Iran Airports Company

Gorgan Airport (Persian: فرودگاه گرگان) (IATA: GBT, ICAO: OING) is an international airport in the city of Gorgan, Golestan province, Iran.

The airport is 2 km west of the Gorgan-Aq Qala Highway and 6 km north of Gorgan, the capital of Golestan province.

== Airlines and destinations ==
Airlines	Destinations
Asa Jet	Tehran–Mehrabad
Caspian Airlines	Kish, Zahedan
Iran Air	Tehran–Mehrabad; Seasonal: Jeddah, Medina
Iran Aseman Airlines	Asaluyeh, Mashhad, Tehran–Mehrabad
Kish Air	Kish, Tehran–Mehrabad
Pars Air	Chabahar/Konarak, Shiraz, Tehran–Mehrabad
Pouya Air	Mashhad, Tehran–Mehrabad
Qeshm Air	Asaluyeh, Tehran–Mehrabad, Zahedan

== Site ==
Prior to the airport's construction, the area was occupied by the Narges Tepe archeological mound. Rescue excavations were carried out in 2004 and 2006 which yielded artifacts ranging from the 2nd Millenium BCE to the Safavid period.

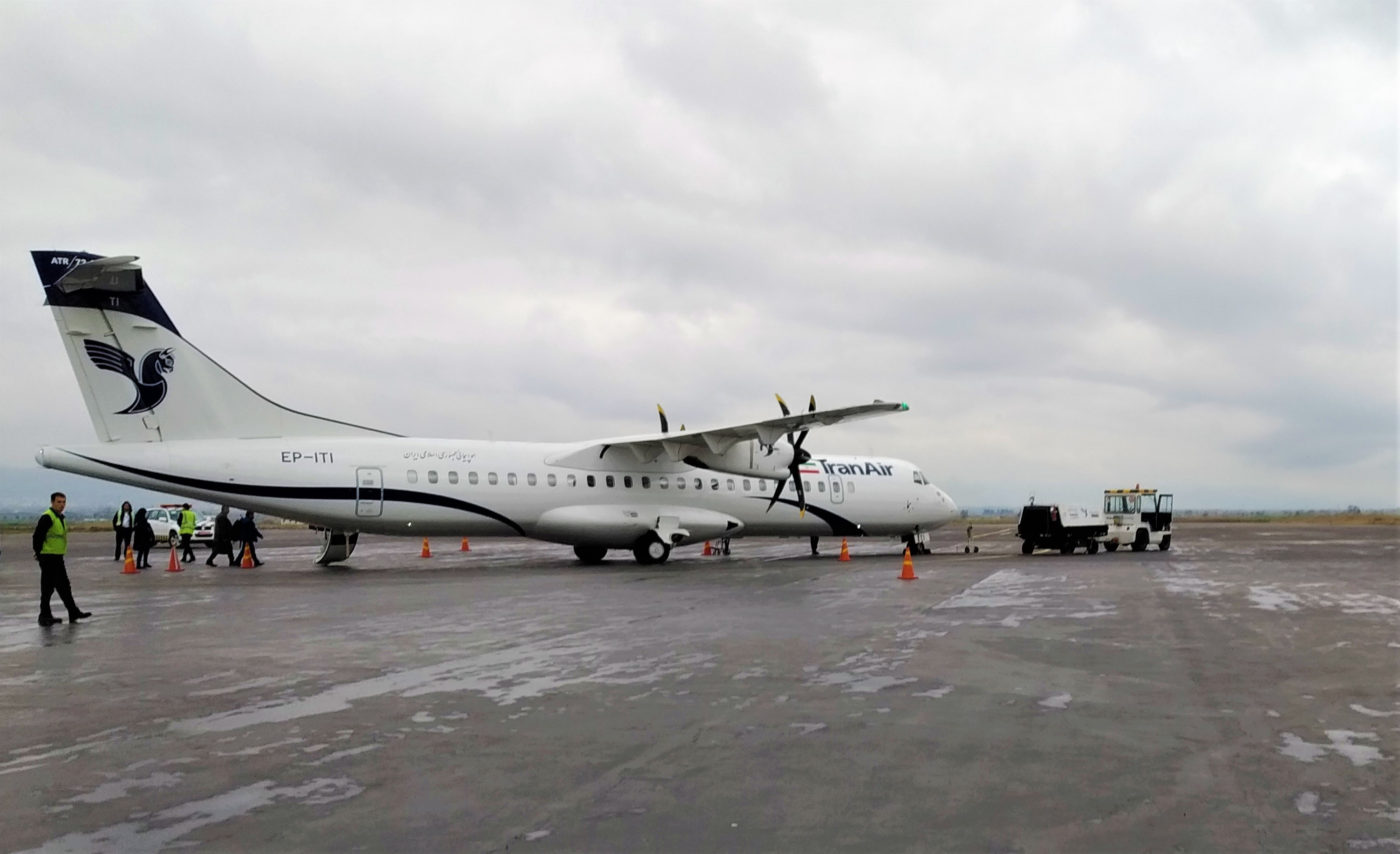
Iran Air ATR 72-600 at Gorgan Airport

== Development and expansion ==
The airport terminal expansion is currently underway: the new wing will be reserved for international flights and will extend for 10,550 sq.

== Accidents and incidents ==
- On 17 May 2001, a short-haul trijet Yakovlev Yak-40 being operated by Faraz Qeshm Airlines crashed while en route to Gorgan Airport from Tehran-Mehrabad Airport in Iran. The aircraft crashed in mountainous terrain while flying in poor weather conditions about twenty kilometers south of Sari, killing all 30 people on board.
