= Huallaga province =

Coordinates: 6.934436°S 76.772826°W

Huallaga
- Province
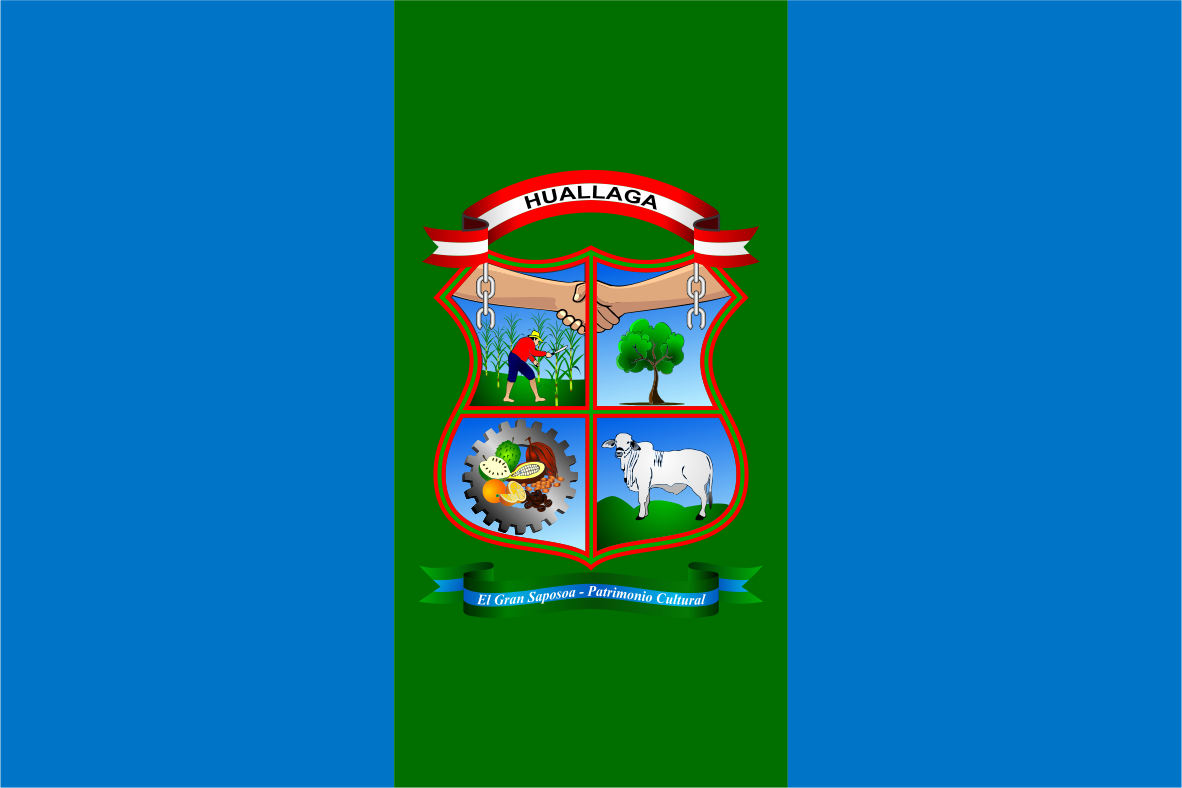
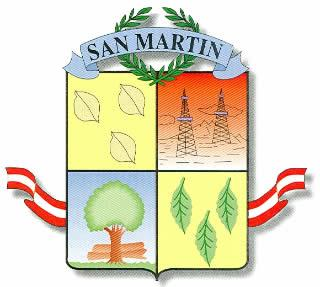
- Flag Coat of arms

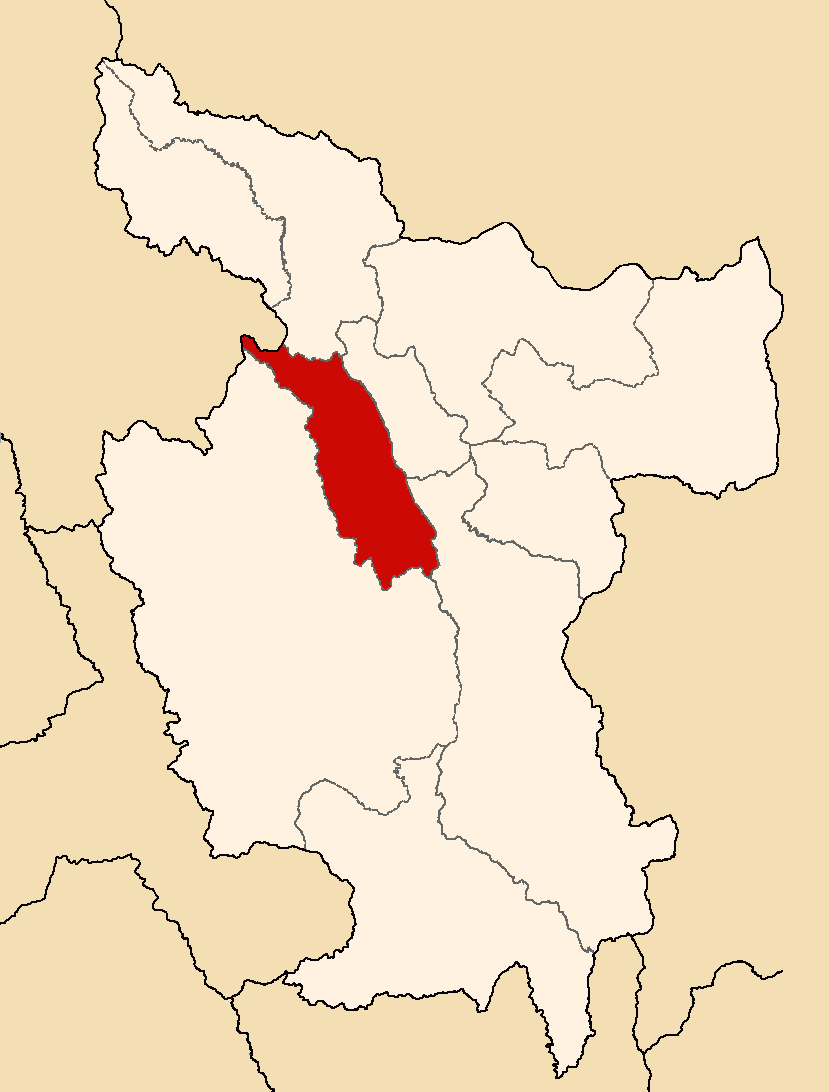
- Location of Huallaga in the San Martín Region
- Country: Peru
- Region: San Martín
- Capital: Saposoa

Area
  - Total: 2,380.85 km^{2} (919.25 sq mi)

Population
  - Total: 27,506
  - Density: 11.553/km^{2} (29.922/sq mi)
- UBIGEO: 2204

Huallaga is one of ten provinces of the San Martín Region in northern Peru.

== Districts ==
- Saposoa
- Alto Saposoa
- El Eslabón
- Piscoyacu
- Sacanche
- Tingo de Saposoa

== See also ==
- Huallaga Valley
- Huallaga River
