= Saposoa Airport =

Airport in Peru

- IATA: none; ICAO: SPOA

Summary
- Airport type: Public
- Serves: Saposoa
- Elevation AMSL: 1,148 ft / 350 m
- Coordinates: 6°57′25″S 76°46′10″W

Map
- Location of the airport in Peru

Runways
Direction	Length		Surface
Direction	m	ft	Surface
17/35	1,800	5,906	Grass
- Source: GCM Google Maps

Saposoa Airport (ICAO: SPOA) is an airport serving the town of Saposoa in the San Martín Region of Peru. The runway is 1.6 kilometres (0.99 mi) south of the town, on the opposite side of the Saposoa River.

As of 2018, local media have reported that the wooden-made shed that functioned as the airstrip's terminal building is abandoned and derelict.

== Accidents ==
- On June 18, 1987: a Peruvian Air Force An-26 (FAP-392) crashed into a mountain gorge near Saposoa, killing all 46 people on board. The weekly civic flight from Lima to Iquitos was servicing inhabitants of remote and difficult-to-access locations and carrying 40 passengers and 6 crew, when it lost contact four minutes before landing in Saposoa; the crew apparently faced limited visibility due to heavy rain falls. The wreckage was discovered nine days later, some 40 kilometers southeast of the airstrip.
- On November 5, 1994, Servicios Aéreos Amazónicos Flight 2079, a Yakovlev Yak-40 trijet (reg. OB-1569) serving the Trujillo-Saposoa-Juanjuí-Tocache-Lima schedule, crashed into the aforementioned river after overrunning the airstrip during landing. The aircraft apparently crashed due to the Ukrainian instructor pilot's decision to land despite heavy rain and poor visual conditions reported at the time which led the aircraft to touch half down the wet runway, which deprived it of enough space to brake, leading to the accident. Reportedly, the pilot's conflict with the Peruvian student copilot over the decision to land would have been a contributing factor, as the latter claimed to have tried to abort the landing at the last moment. Of the 31 occupants (26 passengers and 5 crew) 5 passengers and 1 crewmen died.

== See also ==
- Transport in Peru
- List of airports in Peru
