= Saposoa =

- Town
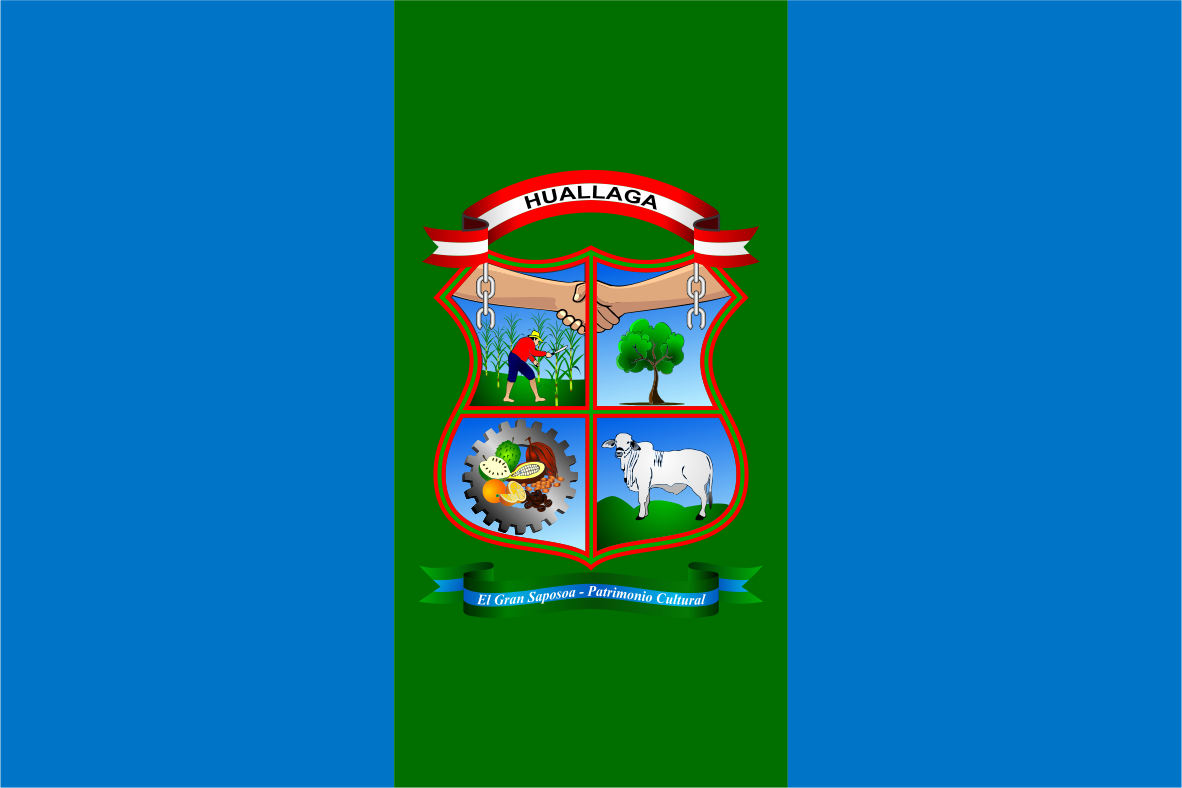
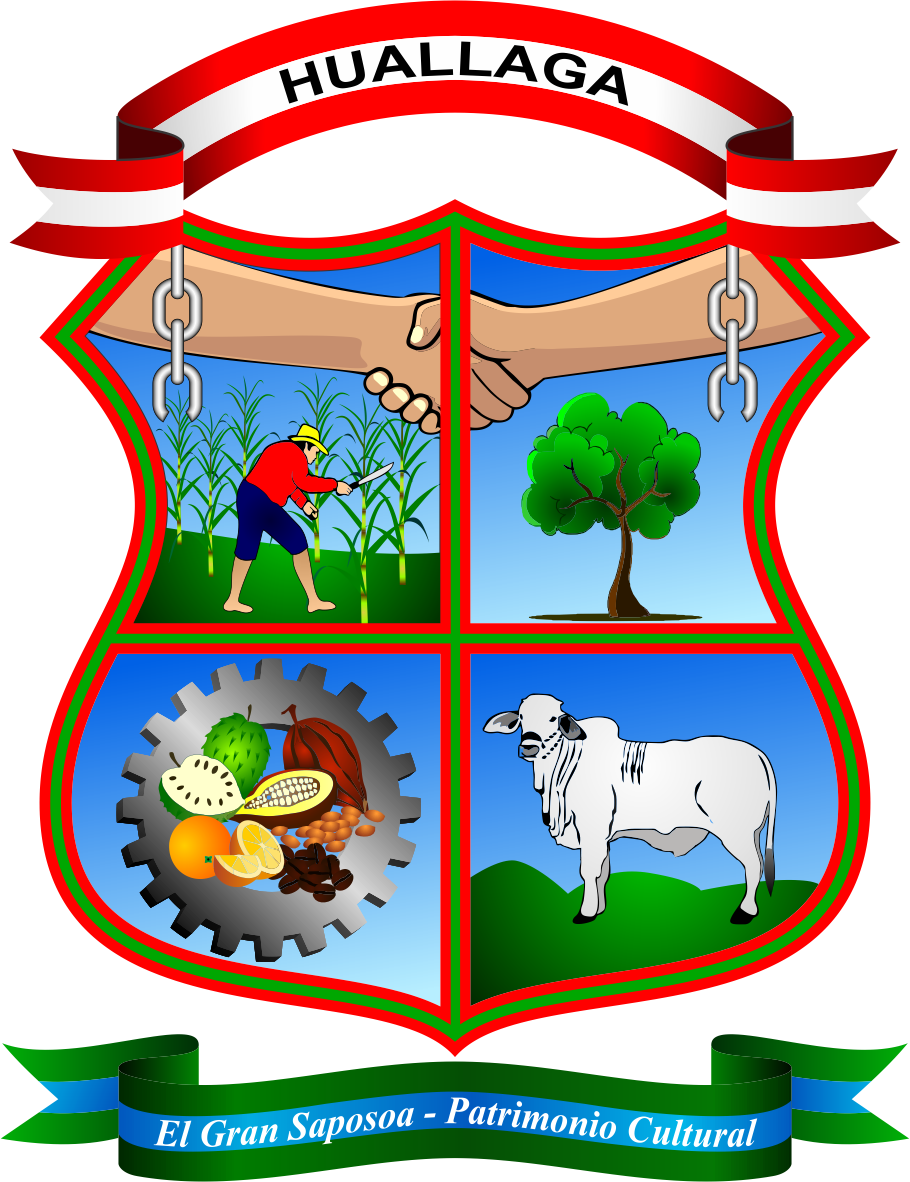
- Flag Seal

- Location within Peru
- Coordinates: 06°56′10.92″S 76°46′18.54″W
- Country: Peru
- Region: San Martín
- Province: Huallaga
- District: Saposoa

Government
  - Mayor: Fernando Grandez Veintemilla
- Elevation: 307 m (1,007 ft)

Population (2007)
  - Total: 12,951
- Time zone: UTC-5 (PET)

Saposoa is a town in Northern Peru, capital of the province Huallaga in the region San Martín. There are 12 951 inhabitants, according to the 2007 census.

It is served by Saposoa Airport.

== Climate ==
Climate data for Saposoa, elevation 307 m (1,007 ft), (1991–2020)
Month	Jan	Feb	Mar	Apr	May	Jun	Jul	Aug	Sep	Oct	Nov	Dec	Year
Mean daily maximum °C (°F)	33.0 (91.4)	32.3 (90.1)	31.8 (89.2)	31.8 (89.2)	31.7 (89.1)	31.5 (88.7)	31.7 (89.1)	33.0 (91.4)	33.1 (91.6)	33.4 (92.1)	33.1 (91.6)	32.6 (90.7)	32.4 (90.4)
Mean daily minimum °C (°F)	22.3 (72.1)	22.4 (72.3)	22.3 (72.1)	22.1 (71.8)	21.9 (71.4)	21.1 (70.0)	20.3 (68.5)	20.2 (68.4)	20.8 (69.4)	21.9 (71.4)	22.5 (72.5)	22.5 (72.5)	21.7 (71.0)
Average precipitation mm (inches)	103.7 (4.08)	148.3 (5.84)	171.2 (6.74)	146.6 (5.77)	98.6 (3.88)	82.9 (3.26)	67.5 (2.66)	68.6 (2.70)	89.2 (3.51)	129.2 (5.09)	151.8 (5.98)	136.6 (5.38)	1,394.2 (54.89)
Source: National Meteorology and Hydrology Service of Peru
