= Bratsk Airport =

Airport in Irkutsk, Russia

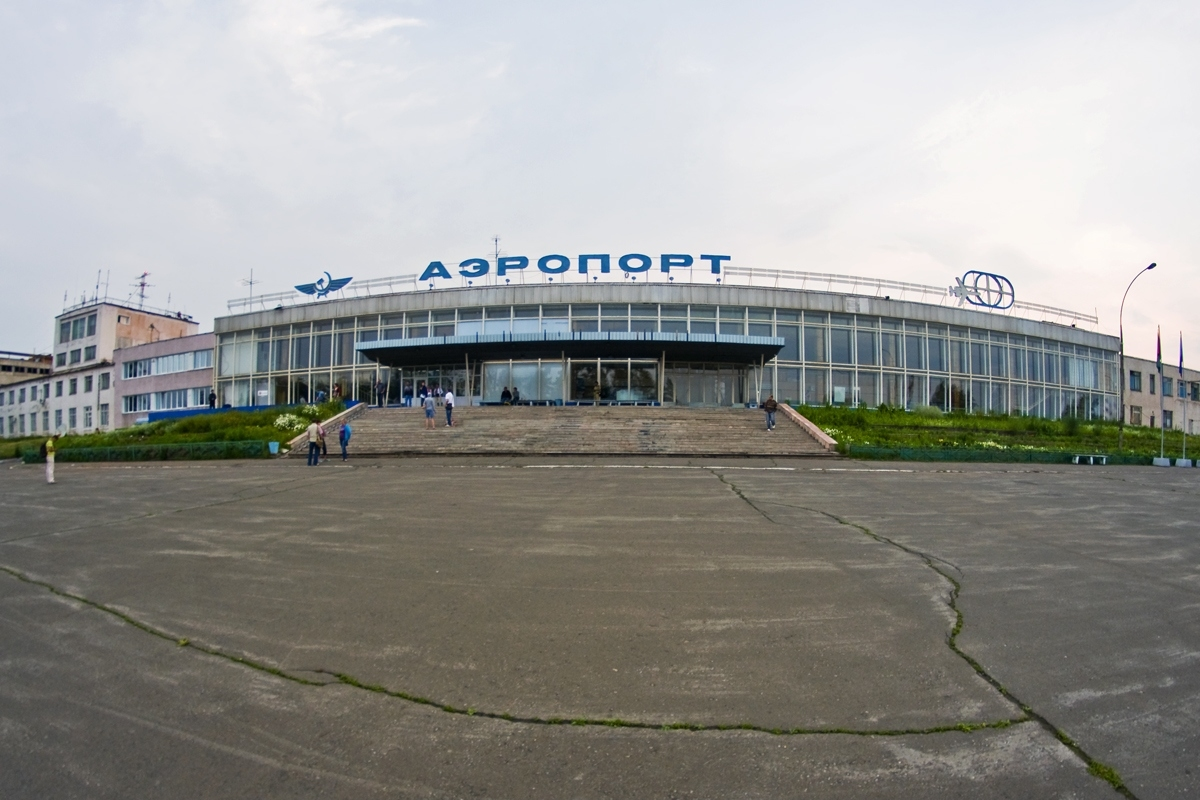
- IATA: BTK; ICAO: UIBB

Summary
- Airport type: Public/military
- Operator: AeroBratsk
- Serves: Bratsk
- Location: Bratsk, Russia
- Hub for: AeroBratsk
- Elevation AMSL: 1,598 ft / 487 m
- Coordinates: 56°22′12″N 101°41′54″E
- Website: aerobratsk.ru

Map
- Location of airport in Irkutsk Oblast

Runways
Direction	Length		Surface
Direction	ft	m	Surface
12/30	10,368	3,160	Concrete

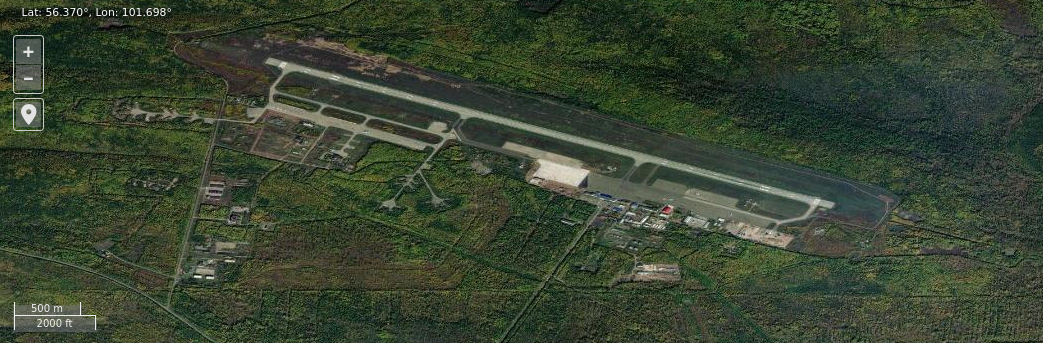
Satellite imagery of Bratsk Airport

Bratsk Airport (Russian: Аэропорт Братск) (IATA: BTK, ICAO: UIBB) is an airport in Irkutsk Oblast, Russia, located 8 kilometres (5 mi) north of Bratsk. It is a mixed use airfield, providing 32 parking spaces for medium-sized airliners. Bratsk Airport serves as a diversion airport on Polar route 2. It is described as an international airport, although currently it only serves internal flights in Russia.

The 350 IAP (350th Interceptor Aviation Regiment) began in 1984 with a number of Tupolev Tu-128 (Fiddler) aircraft. Bratsk was responsible for air defense of most of the Siberian interior region and depended on the long-range capability of the Tu-128 to cover this vast territory. By the 1990s, the unit had been upgraded with MiG-31 jets. The 350 IAP was disbanded in 2002; following this, a small search and rescue detachment of three An-26 (Curl) transports and three Mi-8 (Hip) helicopters under the command of the 32 OSAP (32nd Otdel’nyy smeshannaya avia polk, or “Independent Composite Aviation Regiment”) was based at Yekaterinburg. This detachment had previously been known as 11 APSO. Most of the military barrack blocks and ancillary buildings have now been demolished, although the large hangar dating back to the 1980s is still standing.

Currently, Bratsk Airport continues to serve a vital civil aviation role as a staging base for cargo flights to Kamchatka. The airport is operated by AeroBratsk, its major civilian tenant. The airport consistently serves more than 100,000 passengers each year. It is the second largest airport in the Irkutsk region.

== Airlines and destinations ==
Airlines	Destinations
S7 Airlines	Irkutsk, Moscow–Domodedovo, Novosibirsk
Utair	Irkutsk

== See also ==
- List of airports in Russia
- List of military airbases in Russia
