= Vologda Aviation Enterprise Flight 9651 =

2000 plane crash in Russia

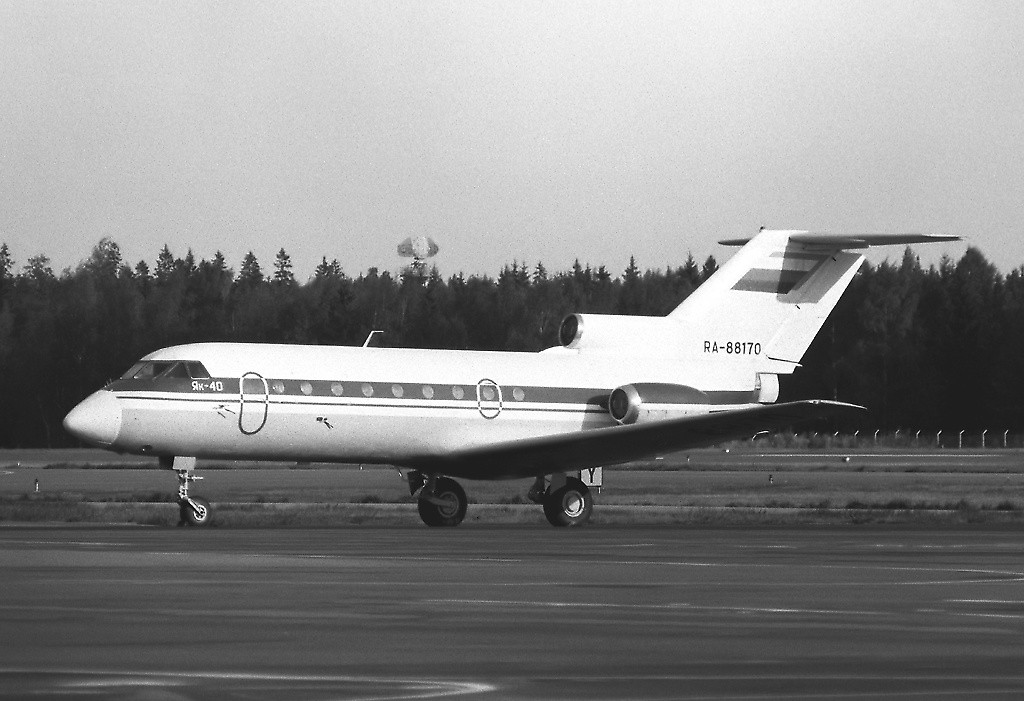
- RA-88170, the aircraft involved, pictured in 1995

Accident
- Date: 9 March 2000
- Summary: Crashed shortly after takeoff due to atmospheric icing and pilot error
- Site: near Sheremetyevo International Airport, Moscow, Russia

Aircraft
- Aircraft type: Yakovlev Yak-40D
- Operator: Vologda Aviation Enterprise
- ICAO flight No.: VGV9651
- Call sign: VOLOGDA AIR 9651
- Registration: RA-88170
- Flight origin: Sheremetyevo International Airport, Moscow, Russia
- Destination: Boryspil International Airport, Kyiv, Ukraine
- Occupants: 9
- Passengers: 4
- Crew: 5
- Fatalities: 9
- Survivors: 0

Vologda Aviation Enterprise Flight 9651 was a regularly scheduled charter flight from Moscow, Russia to Kyiv, Ukraine. On 9 March 2000, the aircraft operating the flight crashed after takeoff from Moscow Sheremetyevo Airport. All nine occupants died. Among the passengers was Artem Borovik, a famous journalist and president of the Sovershenno Sekretno holding company, who was flying with two of his company aides, as well as Ziya Bazhayev, founder and president of the Alliance Oil Company.

== Aircraft and crew ==
The plane involved was a Yakovlev Yak-40D, registration RA-88170 (serial no. 96208 47) manufactured in 1976. At the time of the accident, the plane had accumulated a total of 21,428 flight hours.

The crew consisted of captain Sergei A. Yakushin who had accumulated a total of 6,728 flight hours on the Yak 40, first officer Eduard A. Moguev, who had accumulated a total of 880 flight hours on the Yak 40, and flight engineer Vasily G. Navolotsky, who had accumulated a total of 7,649 flight hours on the Yak 40. There were also two flight attendants onboard: Svetlana G. Koryagina, the wife of the general director of Aerotex, and Evgeniya A. Yakovleva, the daughter of the president of the same airline. However, official documents showed that neither Yakovleva nor Koryagina were certified or trained to be flight attendants.

== Accident ==
At 8:42 AM local time, the plane began its takeoff roll. Shortly after takeoff, at an altitude of approximately 49 feet above the ground, the aircraft entered a stall, This was accompanied by an uncontrollable bank to the left. The aircraft then collided with the ground 1,200 m from the takeoff point and 63 m to the left of the runway centerline. The impact split the fuselage in two, and the debris scattered across the airfield burst into flames. All nine occupants were killed.

Ivan Zashcherinsky, an employee at Sheremetyevo Airport witnessed the aircraft during its final minutes stating:

I was walking to work behind the parking lots, perpendicular to the spot where the plane crashed. The Yak-40 caught my attention because it was taking off steeply. A red and yellow flame was erupting from the left engine exhaust. The plane was climbing. Two seconds later, it suddenly began to bank smoothly to the left. It seemed to be making a left turn toward the terminal building. The plane hit the ground with its left wing, then its nose. Then there was a kerosene explosion, but practically nothing burned; only black clouds of smoke hung over the wreckage for a long time, as there was practically no wind.

== Investigation ==
=== Initial theories ===
It was initially predicted that the aircraft crashed due to a terrorist attack onboard, as the flight included several high-profile passengers. Prior to the flight, it was found that Ziya Bazhayev and Artyom Borovik had been threatened with death threats. This theory was ruled out since there was no evidence of an inflight fire or an act of sabotage or a terrorist attack onboard prior to impact. It was also hypothesized that the aircraft crashed due to loss of control caused by wake turbulence from a Boeing 767 which took off before the flight, but this theory was also refuted.

=== Conclusion ===
The Interstate Aviation Committee (IAC) of Moscow opened an investigation into the accident. It was found that the pilots failed to set the required flap configuration for takeoff (the flaps were set at 11 degrees instead of the required 20 degrees for takeoff) and the failure to deice the aircraft prior to takeoff. The aircraft was only superficially cleaned of loose snow prior to departure. The flames purportedly observed by eyewitnesses spewing from the back of the engine were actually engine surges from the engine backfiring due to a lack of airflow. The excess weight from the accumulated ice on the aircraft's wings combined with the low thrust produced by the surging engine prevented the aircraft from gaining lift and subsequently resulted in impact with the ground. In addition, the flight was hastily and poorly prepared, with the crew rushing to depart, which may have caused them to skip steps during the configuration of the aircraft.

== Controversies ==
Shortly after the accident occurred, Novaya Gazeta raised concern about the crash being rigged by the authorities. Ziya and Artyom has some impact related to the Chechnya freedom of speech. Especially, Artyom was known to favour Vladimir Putin. An independent investigation was made due to the disbelief in the probable cause - human factor.

In an interview, Veronika Borovik-Khilchevskaya, Artem's widow and colleague stated, "We believe that the possibility of conducting an online and, hopefully, competent investigation will accelerate the process of revealing the truth about events that are significant to us all."
