= Qeshm Air =

Iranian airline

Qeshm Air هواپیمایی قشم Havâpeymâyi-ye Qešm

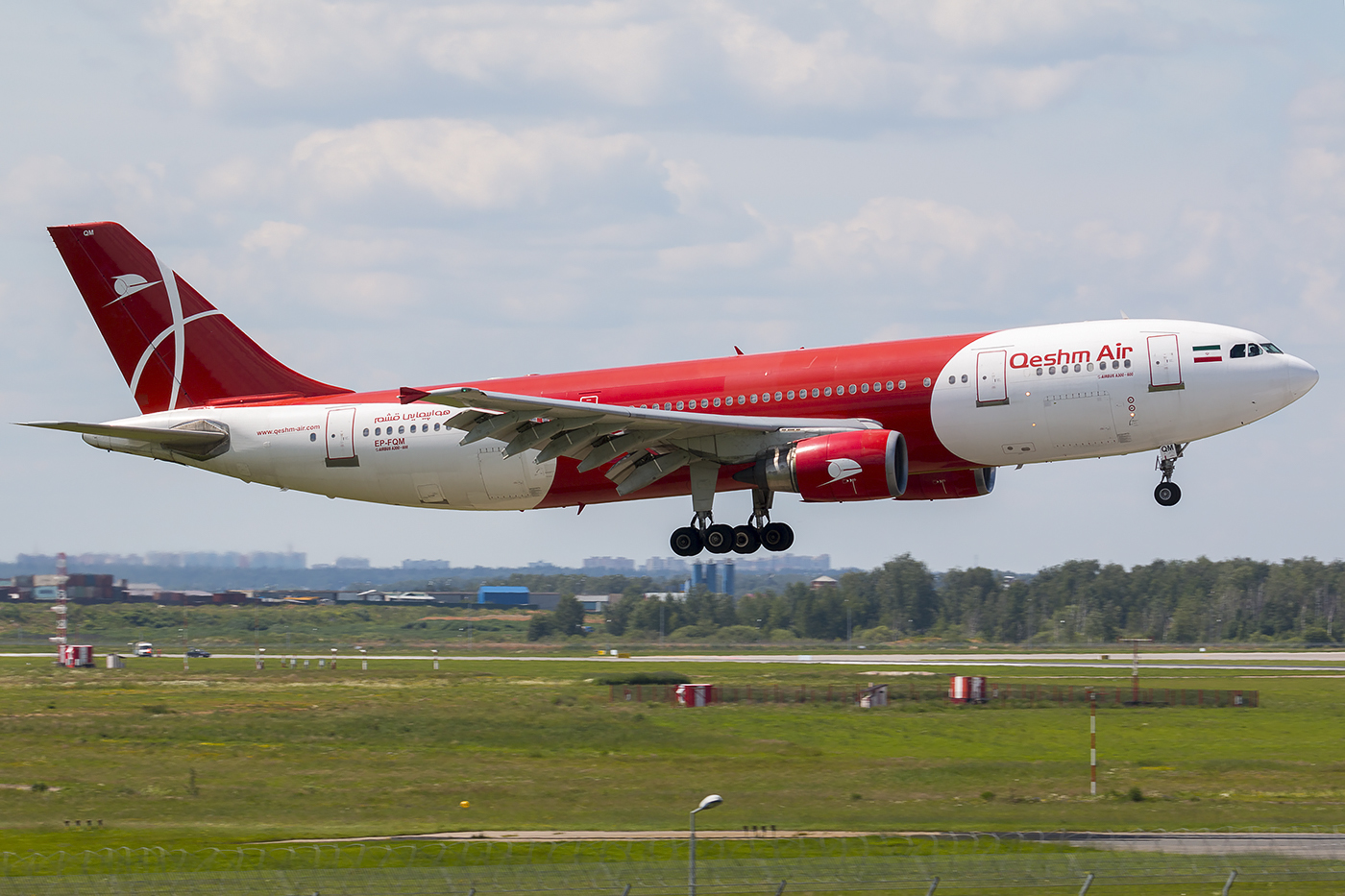
IATA	ICAO	Call sign
QB	QSM	QESHM AIR
- Founded: 1993; 33 years ago
- Commenced operations: 1996; 30 years ago
- Operating bases: Tehran Imam Khomeini International Airport; Tehran Mehrabad Airport; Qeshm International Airport
- Focus cities: Isfahan Shahid Beheshti International Airport; Mashhad Shahid Hasheminejad International Airport; Shiraz Shahid Dastgheib International Airport
- Fleet size: 15
- Destinations: 45
- Parent company: Ministry of Petroleum (Iran)
- Headquarters: Ekbatan Complex, Tehran, Iran
- Key people: Babak Zanjani (Founder)
- Website: www.qeshm-air.com

Qeshm Air (Persian: هواپیمایی قشم, Havâpeymâyi-ye Qešm) is an Iranian airline; it has its headquarters in Tehran, Iran and operates scheduled domestic and international passenger services as well as charter flights. The airline was founded in 1993 as Faraz Qeshm Airline.

Qeshm Air is owned by the Ministry of Petroleum (Iran). It was previously founded and owned by Babak Zanjani, but Zanjani was later convicted of corruption and the airline became part of the Ministry of Petroleum. The Ministry of Petroleum now jointly controls Qeshm Air with private companies.

Qeshm Air is different from Fars Air Qeshm.

== History ==
Qeshm Air was founded in 1993 and established its services by leasing airplanes from other airlines. The company's first routes were from Tehran to Qeshm, and from Tehran to Dubai. By the year 2000, Qeshm Air had seven aircraft in its fleet.

== Fleet ==
=== Current fleet ===
As of July 2026, Qeshm Air operates the following aircraft:

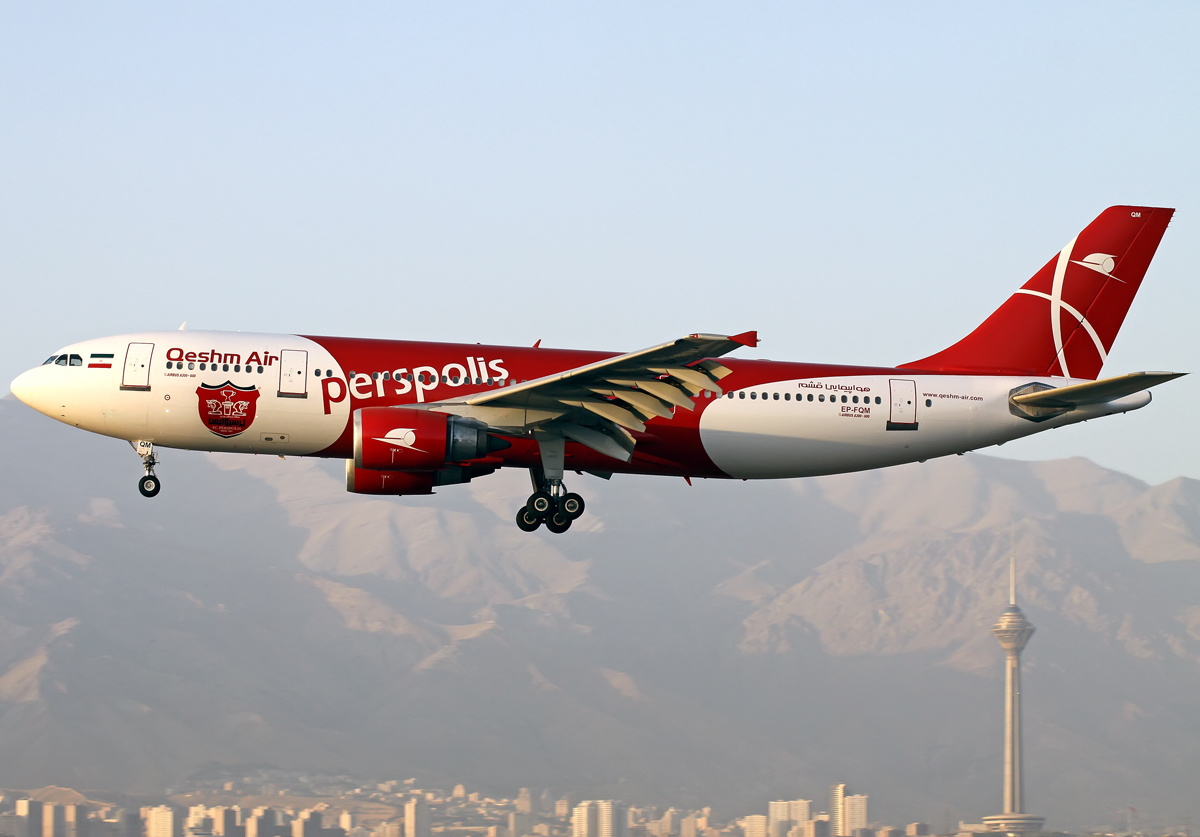
Persepolis FC livery on Airbus A300-600

Qeshm Air Fleet
Aircraft	In Service	Orders	Passengers			Notes
Aircraft	In Service	Orders	C	Y	Total	Notes
Airbus A300-600R	4	—	24	283	307	
Airbus A320-200	3	—	12	144	156	
Avro RJ100	5	—	–	110	110	
Fokker 100	3	—	–	117	117	
Total	15					

=== Former fleet ===
As of August 2025, Qeshm Air operated 4 Airbus A300, 3 Airbus A320, 4 Avro RJ100 and 3 Fokker 100.

Qeshm Airlines also previously operated these aircraft:

- Airbus A300B4
- Airbus A319-100
- Airbus A321-100
- Fokker 50
- McDonnell Douglas MD-83
- Tupolev Tu-154M
- Yakovlev Yak-40
- Yakovlev Yak-42D

== Accidents and incidents ==
- On 17 May 2001, a Faraz Qeshm Airlines Yakovlev Yak-40 departed from Tehran on a flight to Gorgan Airport carrying 30 people; including the Iranian Transport Minister Rahman Dadman, two deputy ministers and seven more members of parliament. It was forced to divert due to bad weather conditions and was later discovered crashed in the Alborz mountains, near Sari, Iran. All on board died.
- On 6 March 2026, a Fokker 100 was destroyed as collateral damage in an airstrike on Mehrabad Airport, as part of the 2026 Iran war.
