= AeroBratsk =

Russian airline

AeroBratsk АэроБратск
IATA	ICAO	Call sign
–	BRP	AEROBRA
- Founded: 1967
- Hubs: Bratsk Airport
- Fleet size: 12
- Destinations: charter
- Parent company: Centre Capital
- Headquarters: Bratsk, Russia
- Key people: Sergey Ivanovich Sumbayev (General Director)
- Website: aerobratsk.ru

JSC AeroBratsk (Russian: АэроБратск) is a minor Russian charter airline headquartered in Bratsk and based at Bratsk Airport, which it also runs. It is currently banned from flying into the EU.

== History ==
AeroBratsk was established in 1967. It was formerly the Aeroflot Bratsk Division, and was renamed Bratsk Avia following the collapse of the Soviet Union. The airline is owned by Rosimushchestvo (51%) and its employees (49%). AeroBratsk was acquired by Centre Capital, which also owned now defunct Russian leisure airline VIM Airlines, at the end of 2004.

== Destinations ==
As of November 2017, AeroBratsk currently only offers charter operations. As of 2009, it still used to operate domestic scheduled destinations from its base at Bratsk Airport to Moscow, Irkutsk and Lensk.

== Fleet ==
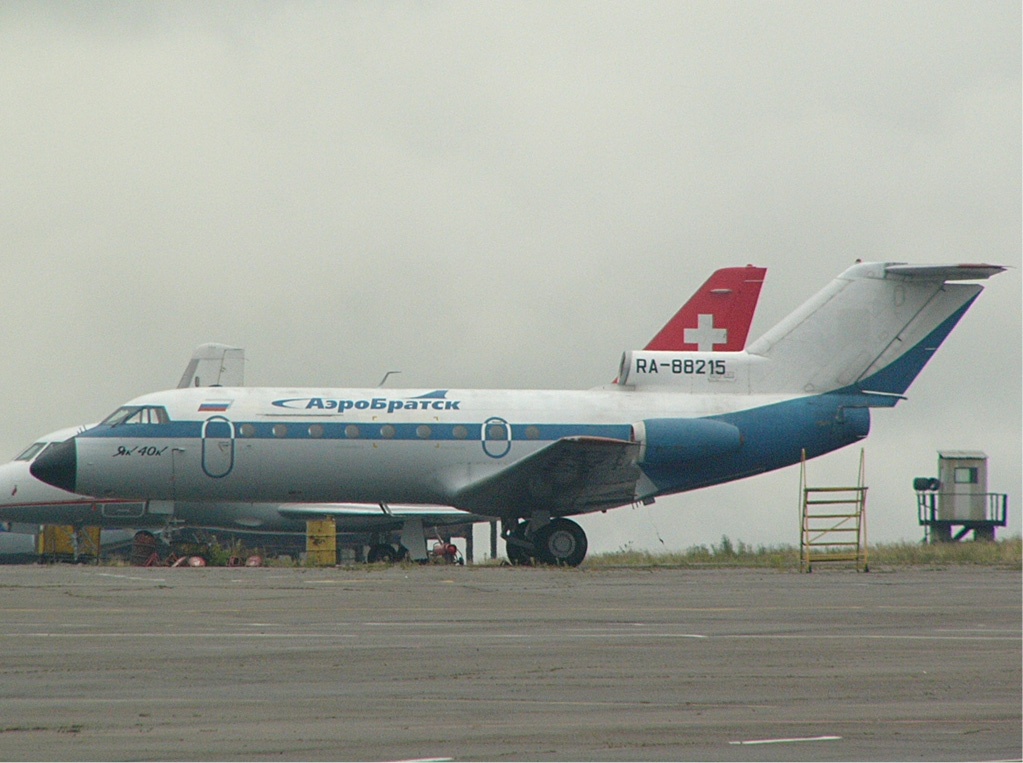
AeroBratsk Yakovlev Yak-40

As of November 2017, the Aerobratsk fleet includes the following aircraft:

Aircraft	Total	Notes
Mil Mi-8	9	Helicopters
Yakovlev Yak-40	3	
