= Rahman Dadman =

Iranian politician (1956–2001)

- Persian: رحمان دادمان
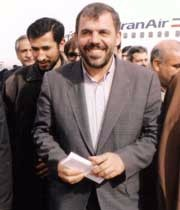

Minister of Roads and Transportation
- In office 14 January 2001 – 17 May 2001
- President: Mohammad Khatami
- Preceded by: Mahmoud Hojjati
- Succeeded by: Ahmad Khorram

Personal details
- Born: 1956 Ardabil, Iran
- Died: 17 May 2001 (aged 44–45) Near Sari, Iran
- Cause of death: Plane crash
- Spouse: Zohratalsadat Nazari
- Children: 4
- Education: University of Tehran, University of Manchester

Rahman Dadman (Persian: رحمان دادمان; 1956–2001) was an Iranian politician. Trained as a civil engineer, Dadman briefly served as the Minister of Roads and Transportation between January and May 2001. He died in a plane crash on 17 May 2001.

== Biography ==
Dadman was born in Ardabil in 1956. He received a bachelor's degree in civil engineering from the University of Tehran in 1983. He also obtained a master of science degree in the same field from the same institution in 1986. Dadman held a PhD again in civil engineering which he received from the University of Manchester in 1996. Before the 1979 revolution Dadman was part of the revolutionaries.

Dadman worked at his alma mater, University of Tehran, as a faculty member. He was appointed Minister of Roads and Transportation under President Mohammad Khatami on 14 January 2001. On 17 May 2001 he died in an air accident with about 30 other passengers in the crash of an Iranian Yak-40 plane, 13 miles from the city of Sari, Iran, in northern Iran.

Dadman was married to Zohratalsadat Nazari who was one of the individuals involved in the capture of the US Embassy in Tehran in November 1979. They had four children. One of his children, Ali Dadman, died on 27 June 2016 under mysterious conditions.

Preceded by Mahmoud Hojjati	Roads and Transportation minister of Iran; January 2001– May 2001	Succeeded by Ahmad Khorram
