= Elista Airport =

Airport in Kalmykia, Russia

Elista International Airport Элистин Келн-орн Нисһх боһал (Elistin keln-orn nishkh bolhalm)
- IATA: ESL; ICAO: URWI

Summary
- Airport type: Public
- Operator: Government
- Location: Elista, Russia
- Elevation AMSL: 501 ft (153 m)
- Coordinates: 46°22′26″N 44°19′51″E
- Website: aero-elista.ru
- Interactive map of Elista International Airport

Runways
Direction	Length		Surface
Direction	m	ft	Surface
09/27	3,200	10,499	Asphalt
09L/27R	2,303	7,555	Grass
- Source: DAFIF

Elista International Airport (Oirat: Элистин Келн-орн Нисһх боһалм, Elistin keln-orn nishkh bolhalm) (IATA: ESL, ICAO: URWI) is an international airport located near the city of Elista in the Republic of Kalmykia of Russia. The airport was closed from 24 February 2022 until May 2024 due to the Russian invasion of Ukraine. The airport reopened on 3 May 2024, and the first flight since 2022 took place on 28 May. The airport later reported that 214 flights had been made to and from the airport over summer 2024, transporting 13,846 passengers.

== Airlines and destinations ==
Airlines	Destinations
Aeroflot	Moscow–Sheremetyevo
Red Wings Airlines	Sochi, Yekaterinburg; Seasonal: Antalya

== See also ==
- List of airports in Russia
