= Ilam Air =

- Founded: 1990s, 2013
- Ceased operations: ?
- Operating bases: Ilam Airport
- Fleet size: 2

Ilam Air is a planned Iranian airline based out of Ilam Airport, it has backing from Yeganeh Sepehr Hodeidah and Yeganeh Sepehr Hodeidah. As of 2026 the airline is forming it's administrative affairs. It is planned to operate 10 aircraft but currently has a fleet of 2 aircraft.

== Initial launch ==
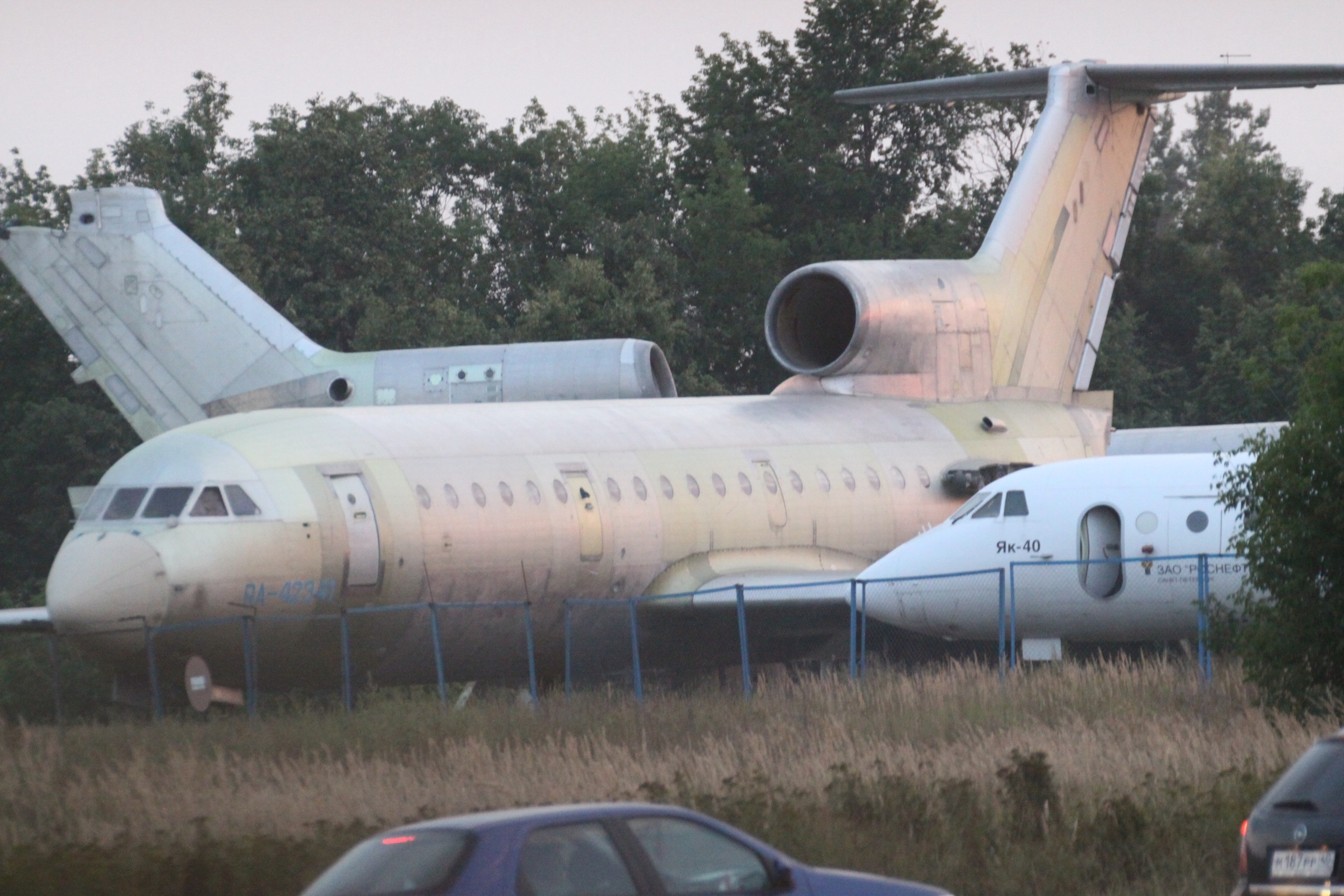

The airline Ilam Air was founded initially in the 1990s and initially operated the Yakolev YAK 42, the aircraft was not delivered.

== Restart ==
The Ilam Province wanted to improve aviation services in 2013 and began the airline Ilam Air, shortly after the ceremony of the founding of the airline a new director at the airport was added. Shortly after it signed a deal for four ERJ 145s. In 2023 it was reported that the airline was preparing to launch operations with unconfirmed reports of a Fokker fleet.

== Fleet ==
The airline operates a fleet of 2 737 Classics and plans to operate the ERJ 145.

== See also ==
List of airlines of Iran
