= List of water parks in Asia =

The following is a list of water parks in Asia sorted by region.

== Afghanistan ==
- Kabul Water Park, Kabul

== Bahrain ==
- The Lost Paradise Of Dilmun Water Park, Zallaq

== Bangladesh ==
- Fantasy Kingdom, Dhaka
- Sea World, Chittagong
- Mana Bay, Munshiganj

== Brunei ==
- Jerudong Park Playground, Bandar Seri Begawan
- Liang Lumut Recreation Club, Kuala Belait

== Cambodia ==
- Garden City Waterpark, Phnom Penh

== China ==
- Aquaventure Waterpark, Sanya (part of Atlantis Sanya)
- Chime Long Water Park, Guangzhou
- Li'an Ocean Harbor Theme Park, Lingshui
- Water Cube, Beijing
- Wet'n'Wild Haikou, Haikou

== India ==
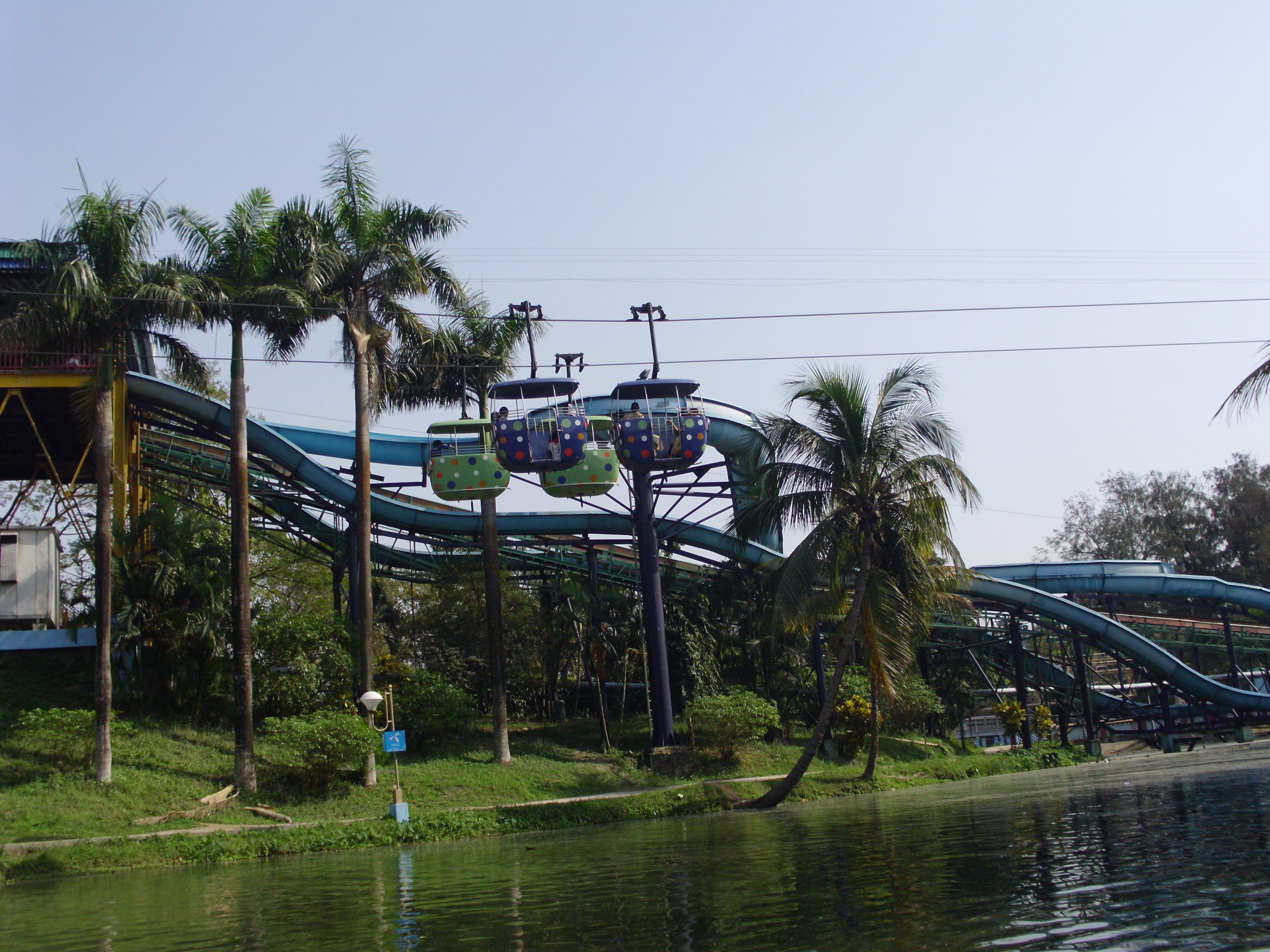
The amusing lake in Nicco park area, in Kolkata, West Bengal

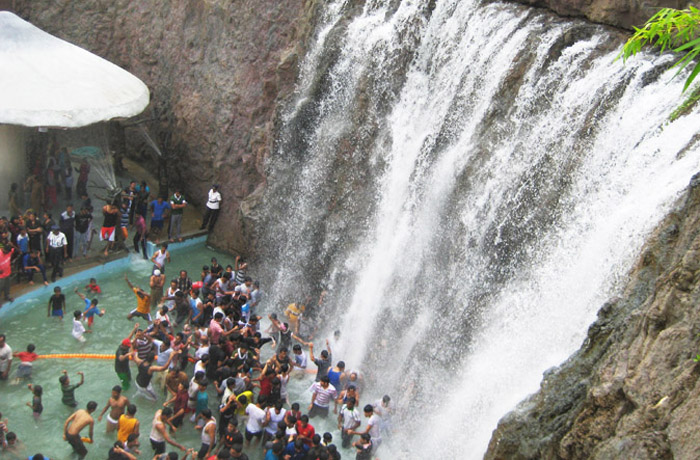
The Virtual Waterfall attraction at Vismaya

=== Andhra Pradesh ===
- Fun Park, Nellore

=== Assam ===
- Accoland, Guwahati

=== Bihar ===
- Funtasia Water Park, Patna
- Hungama World, Patna

=== Delhi ===
- Splash-The Water Park Delhi, Alipur, Delhi

=== Goa ===
- Splashdown Waterpark Goa, Anjuna

=== Gujarat ===
- Amaazia, Surat
- Enjoy City, Borsad
- Heaven Water World, Gondal
- Shanku's Water Park & Resort, Mehsana
- Splash-The Fun World Ahmedabad, Ahmedabad
- Swapna Srushti Water Park, Gandhinagar
- Vanraj water park, Junagadh

=== Haryana ===
- Aqua Village, Pinjore
- Funcity, Panchkula
- Fun N Food Village, Gurgaon, New Delhi
- Jurasik Park Inn, Sonipat
- Splash-The Resorts Hisar, Hisar
- Splash Water World, Rohtak

=== Karnataka ===
- Club Cabana, Bangalore
- Fun world and Water World, Bangalore
- Lumbini Gardens, Bangalore
- Manasa Water Park, Mangalore
- Wonderla, Bangalore

=== Kerala ===
- Dream World, Thrissur,
- Fantasy Park, Palakkad
- Juckies, Kannur
- Merry Kingdom, Kannur
- Vismaya, Kannur
- Wonderla, Kochi

=== Madhya Pradesh ===
- Somanipuram Adventure Park, Indore
- Splash-The Suncity Gwalior, Gwalior

=== Maharashtra ===
- Aquamagica, Adlabs Imagica, Khopoli
- Fun N Food Park, Nagpur
- Sentosa, Pune
- Tikuji-Ni-Wadi, Thane
- Water Kingdom, Gorai, Mumbai
- Wet N' Joy Water Park, Lonavala

=== Nagaland ===
- Merryland Park, Chümoukedima

=== Rajasthan ===
- Pink City Water Park, Jaipur

=== Tamil Nadu ===
- Black Thunder, Coimbatore
- Dash n Splash, Chennai
- Kishkinta, Chennai
- Kovai Kondattam, Coimbatore
- Maharaja Theme Park, Coimbatore

=== Telangana ===
- Jal Vihar, Hyderabad
- Ocean Park, Hyderabad
- Wonderla, Hyderabad

=== Uttar Pradesh ===
- Anandi Water Park, Lucknow
- Blue World, Mandhana, Kanpur
- Dolphin the Water World, Agra
- Ekta Water Park, Kanpur
- Jungle Water Park, Kanpur
- Nilansh Waterpark, Lucknow
- Sports Village, Bithoor, Kanpur
- Water Island (Fantasy Motels), Kanpur Lucknow Hwy, Unnao
- Worlds of Wonder Water Park, Noida

=== West Bengal ===
- Aqua Marina Water Parks and Resorts, Kolkata
- Aquatica, Kolkata
- Bellilious Park, Kolkata
- Fantasy World, Kolkata
- Nature Park, Kolkata
- Nicco Park, Kolkata
- Rose Valley Amusement Parks, Kolkata
- Savin Kingdom, Siliguri

== Indonesia ==
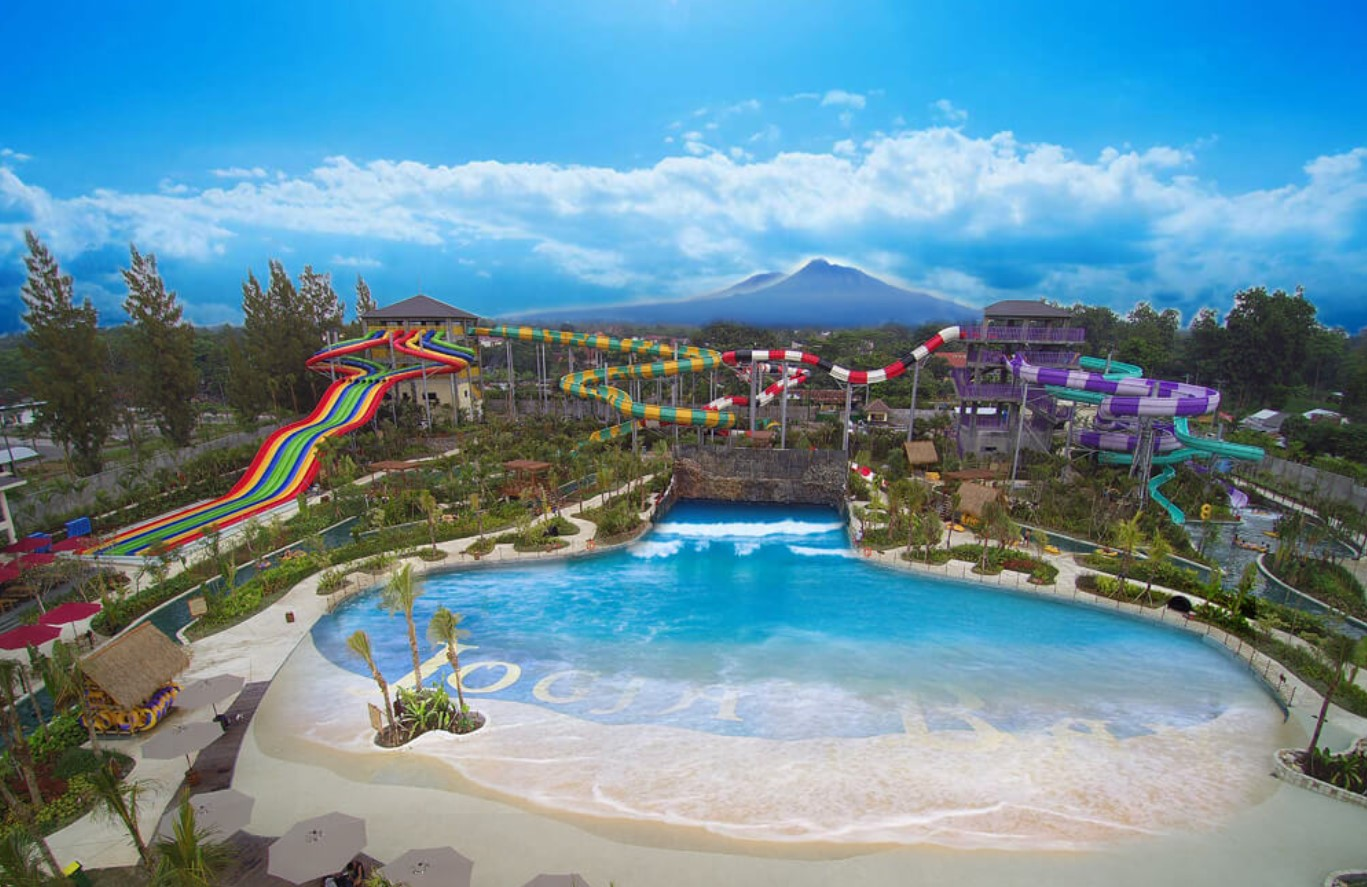
Volcano Coaster at Jogja Bay (now Waterboom Jogja)

- Aquaboom Waterpark, Balikpapan
- Waterboom Jogja Bay, Yogyakarta – the biggest waterpark in Indonesia
- Kediri Waterpark, Kediri – has the longest race slide in Asia
- Caribbean Island Waterpark, Balikpapan
- Citra Raya Water World, Tangerang
- Taman Wisata Matahari Waterpark at Taman Wisata Matahari, Bogor
- Transera Waterpark, Bekasi
- Go! Wet, Bekasi
- Water Kingdom Mekarsari, Bekasi
- Wahoo Waterworld, Bandung
- Hairos Waterpark, Medan
- Maros Water Park, Maros
- Palm Bay Waterpark, Jakarta
- Bugis Waterpark, Makassar
- Waterland Cirebon, Cirebon
- ParadisQ Waterpark, Pontianak
- Pondok Indah Waterpark, Jakarta
- Wonderland Adventure Waterpark, Karawang
- Ocean Park Water Adventure, BSD City, South Tangerang
- Atlantis Water Adventures, Ancol, Jakarta
- Jepara Ourland Park, Jepara
- Hawai Waterpark, Malang
- Havana Waterpark, Banyuwangi
- Owabong, Purbalingga
- Wisata Bahari Lamongan, Lamongan
- The Jungle Waterpark, Sentul City, Bogor
- Waterboom at Jawa Timur Park, Batu
- Waterbom Bali, Bali
- Waterboom, Cikarang

== Iran ==
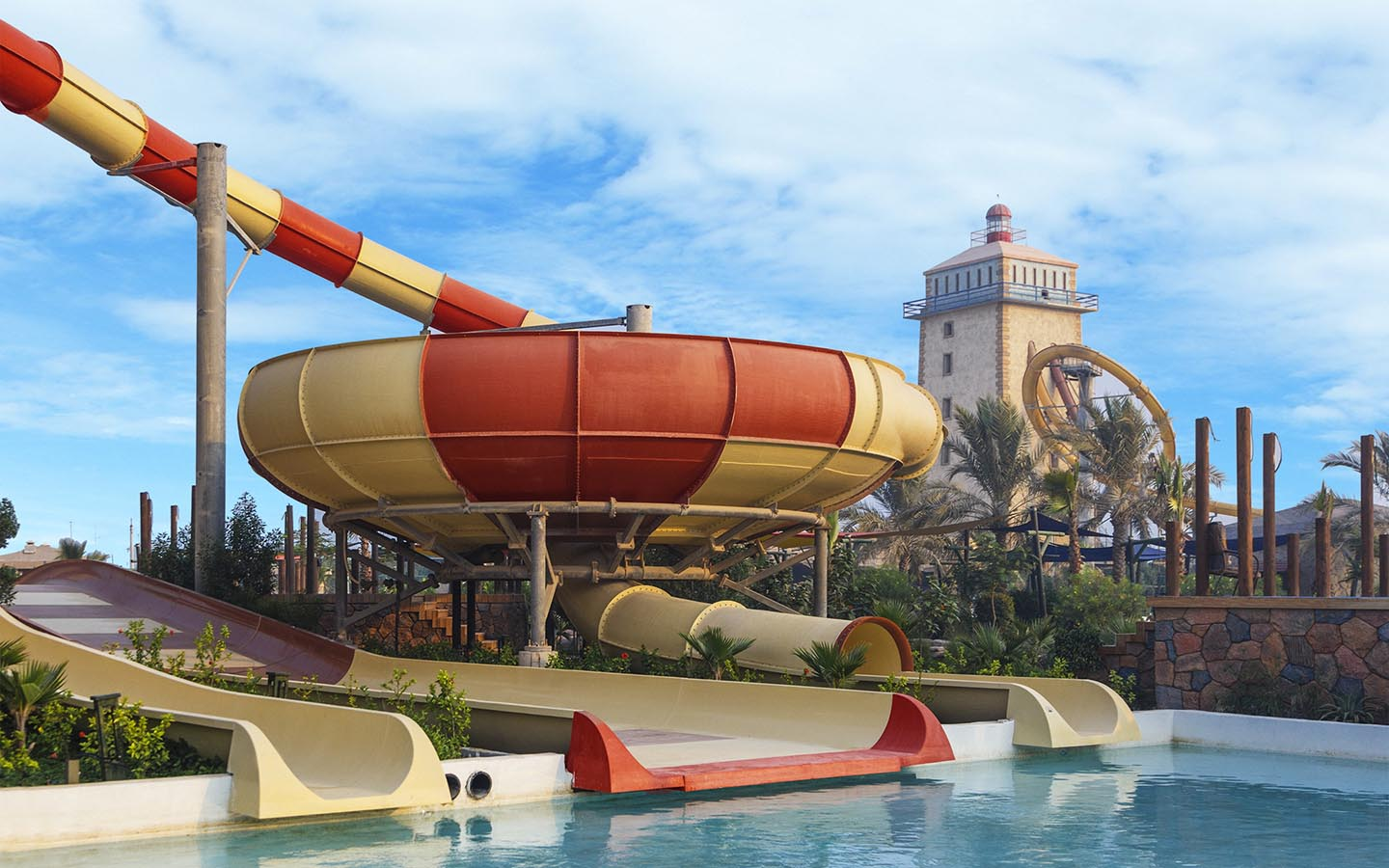
The Gerdab water slide attraction at Ocean Water Park

- Ocean Water Park, Kish Island
- Azadegan Water Park, Tehran
- Opark water park, Tehran
- Aftab Water Park, Mashhad
- Iranian Water Park, Mashhad
- Moj-Haye Khoroshan water park, Mashhad
- Padide Water Park, Mashhad
- Water Wave's Land, Mashhad
- Dehkade Abi Pars, Karaj
- Persian water park, Karaj
- Supark water park, Karaj
- Danesh water park, Karaj
- Aria water park, Karaj
- Foruzan water park, Shiraz
- Kosar water park, Shiraz
- Morvarid water park, Shiraz
- Tabriz aqua park, Tabriz
- Helya water park, Tabriz
- Khavaran water park, Tabriz
- Absar water park, Isfahan
- Saadi water park, Isfahan
- Nazhvan water park, Isfahan
- Pardis aqua park, Babol
- Abotab water park, Qom
- Mysterious castle water park, Bandar Abbas
- Ahvaz water park, Ahvaz
- Baran Blue waves water park, Yazd

== Iraq ==
- Aquapark, Erbil
- Aquapark Baghdad, Baghdad
- Aqua Tarin, Erbil
- Ekwa parkî çavîland Aquapark, Sulaymaniyah
- Marina Water City, Hillah
- Tigris Water City, Baghdad

== Israel ==
- Gai Beach Water Park, Tiberias
- Harbaji Water Park, Nazareth
- Meymadion, Tel Aviv
- Shefayim Water Park, Kibbutz Shefayim – Israel's largest water park
- Splash Water Park, Eilat
- Yamit 2000 Spark Water Park, Holon
- Yavne Water Park, Yavne
- Waterland Eilat, Eilat

== Japan ==
- Hirakata Park, Hirakata, Osaka
- Nagashima Spa Land, Kuwana city, Mie Prefecture – large waterpark and spa 30 minutes away from Nagoya city
- Space World, Yahatahigashi-ku, Kitakyūshū
- Yokohama Hakkeijima Sea Paradise, Kanazawa-ku, Yokohama
- Yomiuriland, Inagi, Tokyo
- Tokyo Summerland, Akiruno, Tokyo

== Jordan ==
- Aquapark La Cueva, Sweimeh
- Saraya Aqaba Waterpark, Aqaba

== Kazakhstan ==
- Aquapark Central Recreation Park of Almaty, Almaty
- Aquapark Delfin, Karaganda
- Aquapark Fontan, Shymkent
- Aquapark Hawaii, Almaty
- Aquapark Tree Of Life, Aktau
- Laguna Akvapark, Aktau

== Kuwait ==
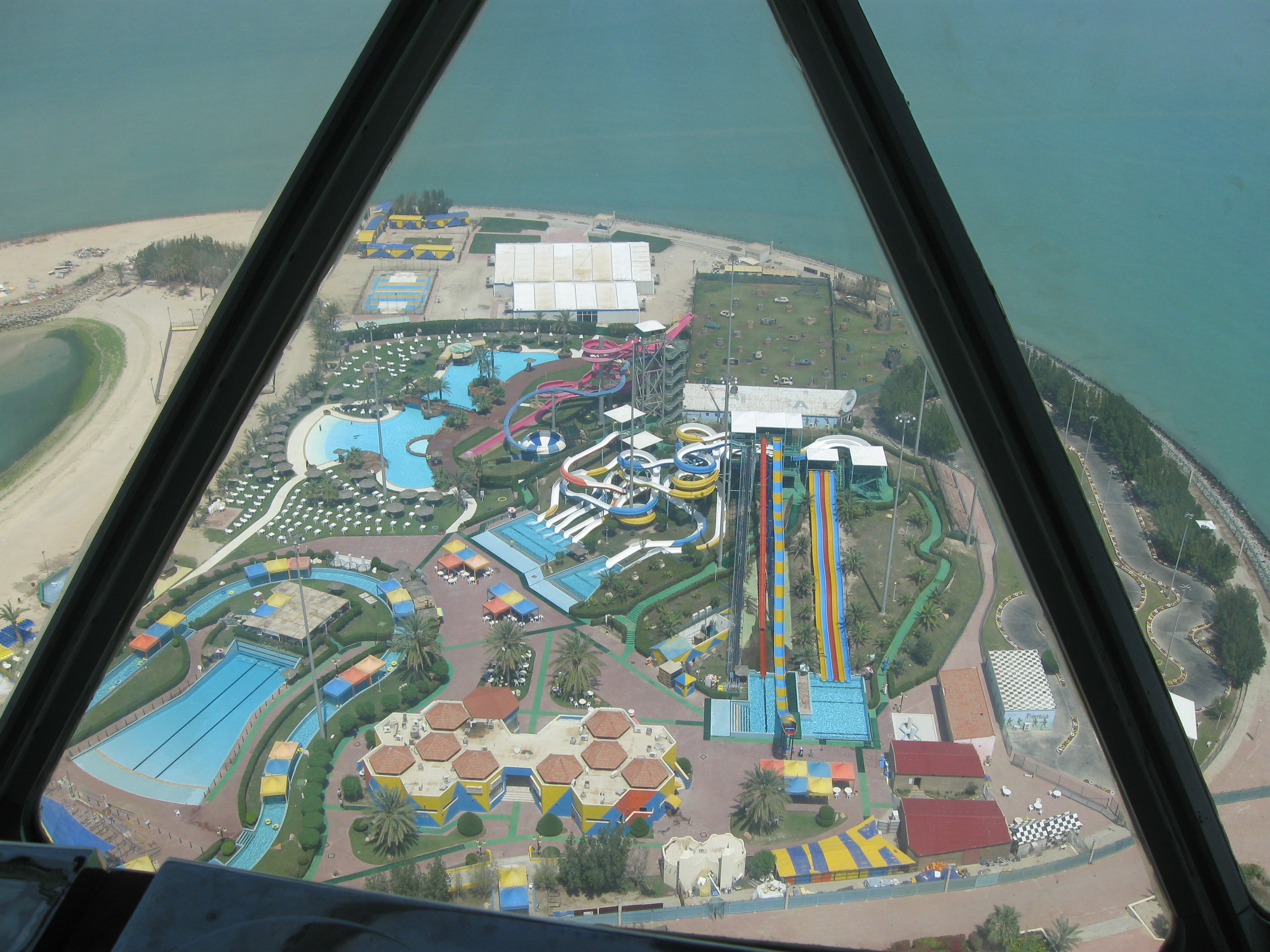
Aqua Park, Kuwait City

- Aqua Park, Kuwait City
- Bay Zero, Kuwait City
- Messila Water Village, Messila Beach

== Kyrgyzstan ==
- Aqua Park Alatoo, Bishkek

== Laos ==
- Vientiane Ocean Park, Vientiane

== Lebanon ==
- Aquapark Watergate, Dbayeh
- Aquapark Waves, Mansourieh
- K-Bridge Water Park, Froun
- Rio Lento, Zouk Mosbeh

== Malaysia ==
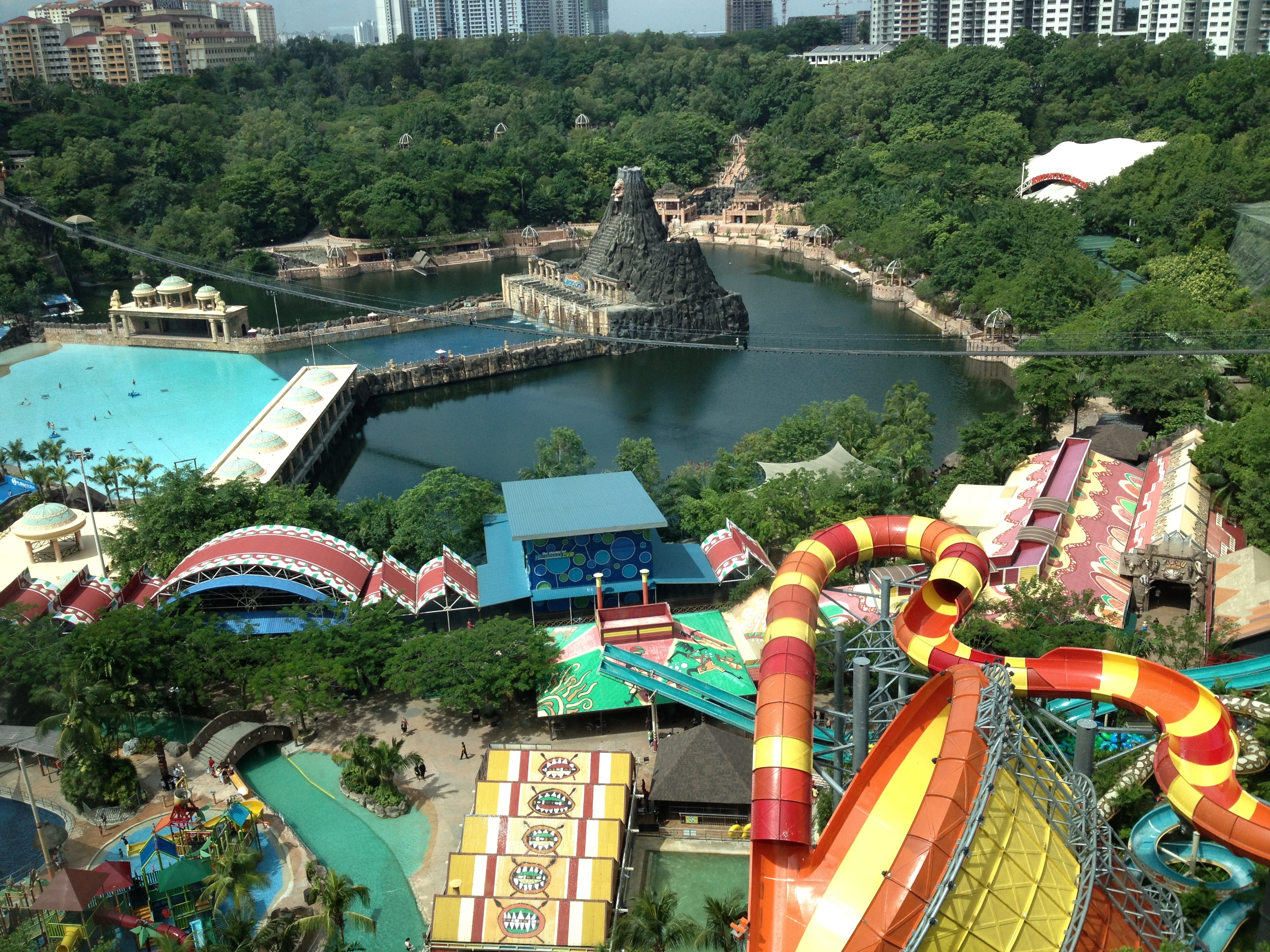
Aerial view of Sunway Lagoon, Malaysia

- A' Famosa Resort, Malacca
- Bukit Merah Laketown Water Park, Perak
- Carnival Water Park, Kedah
- ESCAPE Waterplay, Penang
- Gold Coast Morib Themes Water Park, Sepang
- Bukit Gambang Waterpark, Pahang
- Legoland Water Park, Johor Bahru
- Lost World of Tambun, Ipoh
- Melaka Wonderland, Malacca
- SplashMania Waterpark, Selangor
- Stampak Water park, Kuching
- Sunway Lagoon, Subang Jaya
- Tasik kenyir Water Park, Terengganu
- Tiara Beach Resort, Port Dickson
- Tiram Indoor Water Park, Johor Bahru
- Water World@I-City, Shah Alam
- Wet World Hot Spring, Pedas

== Myanmar ==
- Yangon Water Boom, Yangon

== North Korea ==
- Munsu Water Park, Pyongyang

== Oman ==
- Al Naseem Salalah Water Park, Salalah
- Hawana Aquapark, Taqah
- Wadina Water Park, Nizwa

== Pakistan ==
- Sozo Water Park, Lahore

== Palestinian Territories ==
- Water Land, Jericho

== Philippines ==
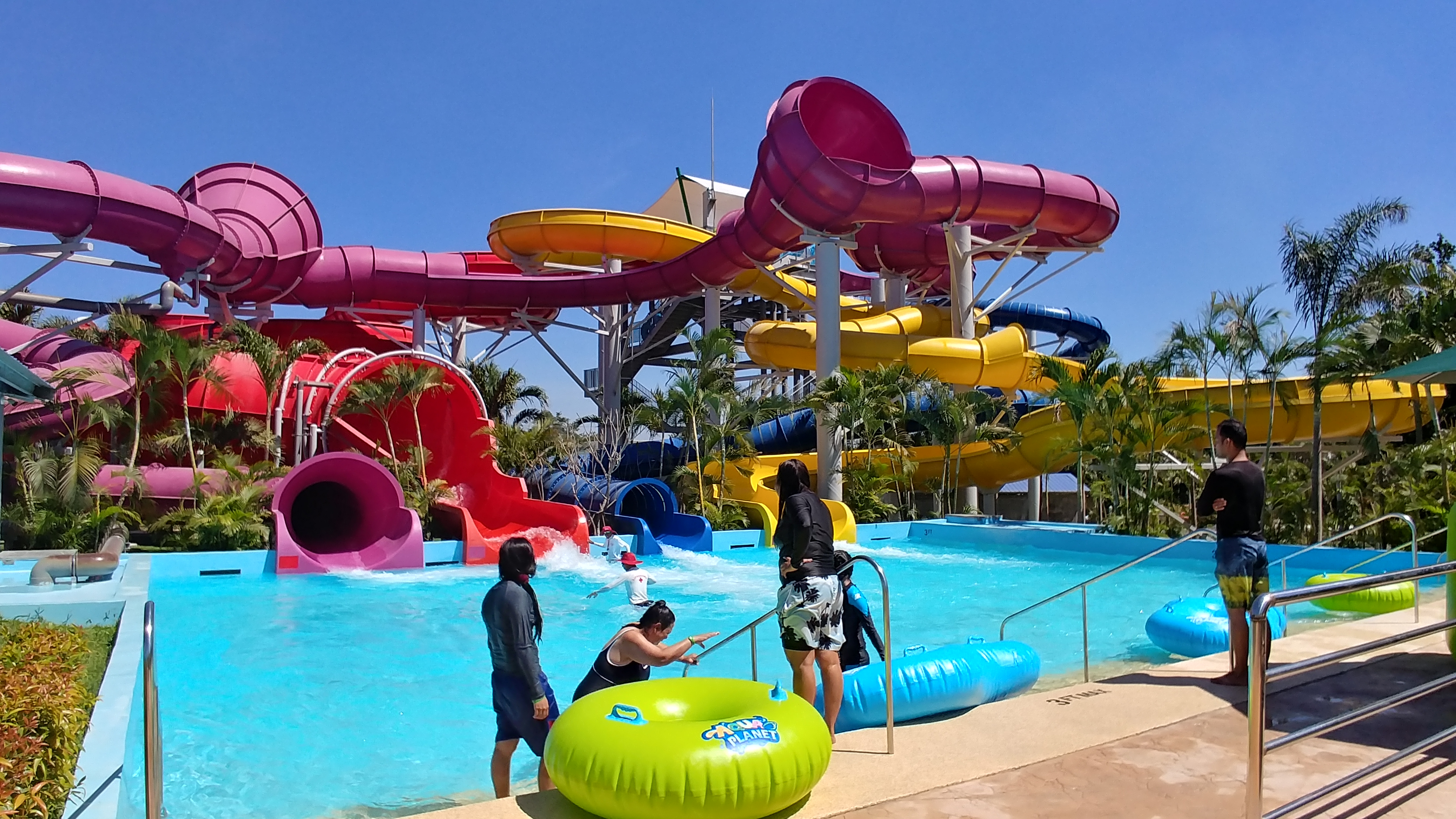
Aqua Planet in Clark Freeport Zone, Pampanga, Philippines

- 8 Waves Waterpark and Resort, Baliwag, Bulacan
- Adventure Beach Waterpark, Subic Bay Freeport, Zambales
- Amana Waterpark, Pandi, Bulacan
- Aqua Planet, Clark Freeport Zone, Pampanga
- Aquaria Water Park, Calatagan, Batangas
- Fontana Water Theme Park, Clark Freeport Zone, Pampanga
- Jed's Island Resort, Calumpit, Bulacan
- Jpark Island Resort & Waterpark, Lapu-Lapu City, Cebu
- Seven Seas Waterpark and Resort, Opol, Misamis Oriental
- Splash Island, Biñan, Laguna
- WaterWorld Cebu, Mandaue, Cebu
- WaterWorld Iloilo, Jaro, Iloilo City, Iloilo
- Campuestohan Highland Resort, Talisay Negros Occidental
- Splash Park, Bacolod Negros Occidental

== Qatar ==
- Meryal Waterpark, Lusail
- Aquapark Qatar, Abu Nakhla

== Russia ==
- Aquamarine, Khanty-Mansi Autonomous Okrug, Surgut
- Aquamir, Novosibirsk

== Singapore ==
- Adventure Cove Waterpark
- Wild Wild Wet, Pasir Ris

== Saudi Arabia ==
- Cyan Waterpark, Jeddah
- Aquarabia, Qiddiya City
- Cala Water Park, Hafar al-Batin

== Sri Lanka ==
- SplashBay, Bandaragama
- LeisureWorld Water Park, Hanwella

== South Korea ==
- Caribbean Bay, Yongin (part of Everland Resort)
- Lotte Water Park, Gimhae, Gyeongsangnam-do (part of Lotte World)
- Ocean World, Hongcheon-gun, Gangwon-do, Korea
- Sun Beach Water Park, Ch'angwon Gyeongsangnam-do
- Woongjin Playdoci, Bucheon-si, Gyeonggi-do, Korea

== Tajikistan ==
- Aquapark Obshoron, Dushanbe
- Delfin Waterpark, Dushanbe

== Taiwan ==
- Formosa Fun Coast, Bali, New Taipei City
- Taipei Water Park, Taipei

== Thailand ==
- A-Nature, Phitsanulok
- Ayutthaya Water Park, Phra Nakhon Si Ayutthaya
- Andamanda Water Park, Phuket
- Banharn Slider Water Park, Suphan Buri
- Black Mountain Water Park, Hua Hin
- Blue Tree Phuket (Blue Tree Lagoon), Phuket (closed in 2024)
- Columbia Pictures Aquaverse, Chonburi
- Phrom Paradise, Chiang Mai
- Chat Trakan Waterpark, Phitsanulok
- Chiang Mai Zoo Water Park, Chiang Mai
- Chiang Rai Park Resort, Chiang Rai
- Coco Splash Adventure and Water Park, Samui
- Dictionary Park, Maha Sarakham
- Dino Water Park, Khon Kaen
- Dreamer Water Park, Sa Kaeo
- Fantasia Lagoon Water Park, Bangkok, Nakhon Ratchasima and Nonthaburi
- Fighter Jet Water Park, Nakhon Si Thammarat
- Funny Park at Play La Ploen, Buriram
- The Hero Water Park, Nong Khai
- Jungle Water Park, Pathum Thani
- Jurassic Water Park, Nakhon Pathom
- Kaimook Waterpark, Samut Songkhram
- Khaoyai Fantasy Water Park, Nakhon Ratchasima
- Khaw Sri Wong Waterpark – Slider, Phetchabun
- Korat Zoo Lagoon, Nakhon Ratchasima
- Leoland Water Park, Bangkok
- Mae Fung, Chaiyaphum
- MahaSamutr Hua Hin, Prachuap Khiri Khan
- MJ Waterpark, Phetchabun
- Mukdahan Waterpark- Golf Country, Mukdahan
- P Land Water Park, Sakon Nakhon
- Paradise Park, Samut Prakan
- Pattaya Park Funny Land & Water Park, Chonburi
- Phetrat Water Park and Pool, Saraburi
- Phuket Aquapark, Phuket
- Phukradueng Waterpark & Zoo, Loei
- The Pirates Park, Surat Thani
- Playport Udon Thani Water Park, Udon Thani
- Play Park Buriram, Buriram
- Pooh Paeng Water Park, Maha Sarakham
- Pororo Water Park, Bangkok
- Ramayana Water Park, Chonburi
- The Resort Water Park, Ratchaburi
- Santorini Water Fantasy, Cha-am
- Saran Water Park, Surin
- Scenical World, Nakhon Ratchasima
- Sea Paradise, Lampang
- Siam Park City, Bangkok
- Songkhla Zoo Water Park, Songkhla
- Space Water Park, Chainat
- Splash Jungle Water Park, Phuket
- The Splash Water Park, Ubon Ratchathani
- Splashdown Waterpark, Chonburi
- Star Tiger Zoo and Water Park, Chaiyaphum
- The Sun Water Park, Lamphun
- Surat Waterpark, Surat Thani
- Thanakorn Water Park, Nakhon Sawan
- Thonglor Waterpark, Ubon Ratchathani
- Tube Trek Waterpark, Chiang Mai
- Udon Water World, Udon Thani
- Usotel Waterland, Udon Thani
- Vana Nava Water Park, Hua Hin
- Water Fun Dream World, Pathum Thani
- Water Park Roi-Et, Roi Et
- Water Wonder Park, Ubon Ratchathani
- West Wonder Waterpark, Kanchanaburi

== Turkmenistan ==
- Aquapark Alemgoshar, Awaza
- Aquapark Awaza, Awaza
- Aquapark Gala, Ashgabat

== United Arab Emirates ==
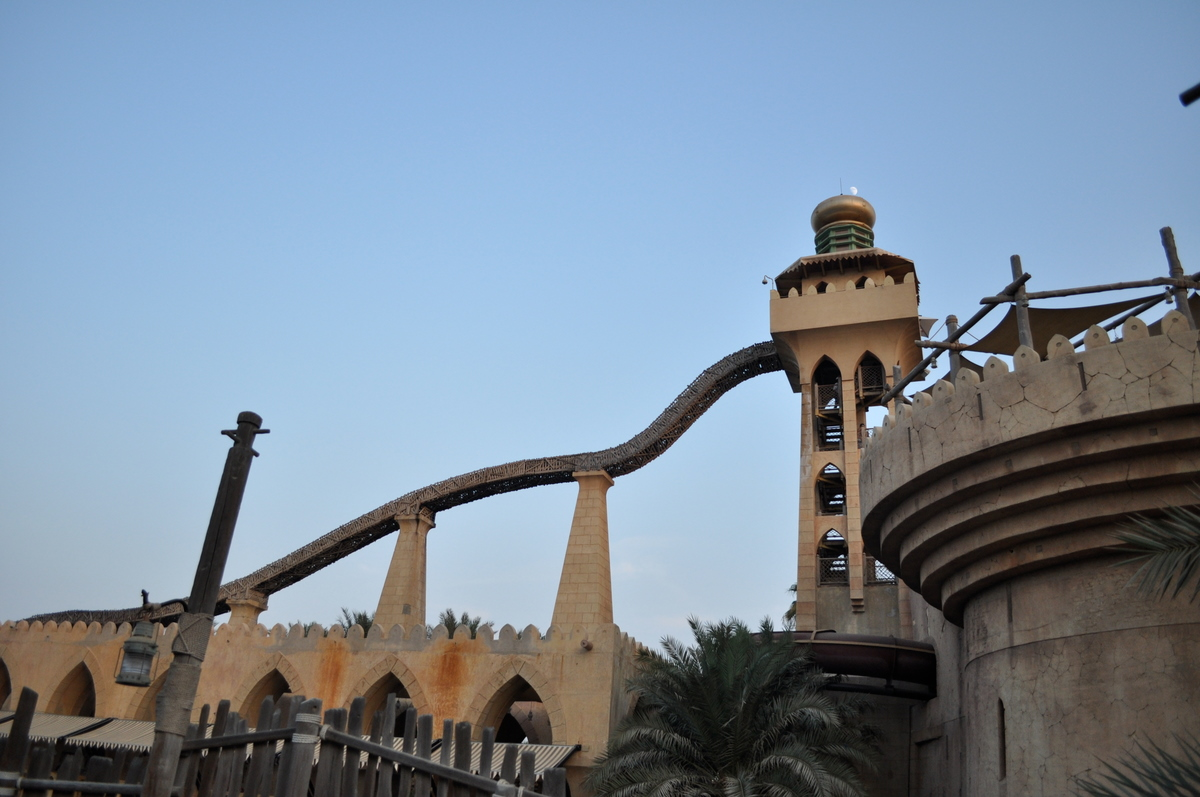
Jumeirah Sceirah at Wild Wadi Water Park

- Aquaventure Waterpark, Emirate of Dubai (part of Atlantis The Palm, Dubai)
- Dreamland Aqua Park, Emirate of Umm al-Quwain
- Wild Wadi Water Park, Jumeirah, Emirate of Dubai
- Yas Waterworld, Yas Island, Emirate of Abu Dhabi
- Al Montazah Water Park, Emirate of Sharjah
- Jungle Bay Water Park, Emirate of Dubai

== Uzbekistan ==
- Akvalend Toshkent, Tashkent
- Aquapark, Tashkent
- Oasis Waterpark, Tashkent

== Vietnam ==
- Aquatopia Water Park, Hon Thom Island (Part of Sun World)
- Đầm Sen Water Park, Ho Chi Minh City
- The Amazing Bay, Đồng Nai

== See also ==
- List of water parks
- List of amusement parks in Asia
