= Kish Island =

Kish Island جزیره‌ی کیش Kish
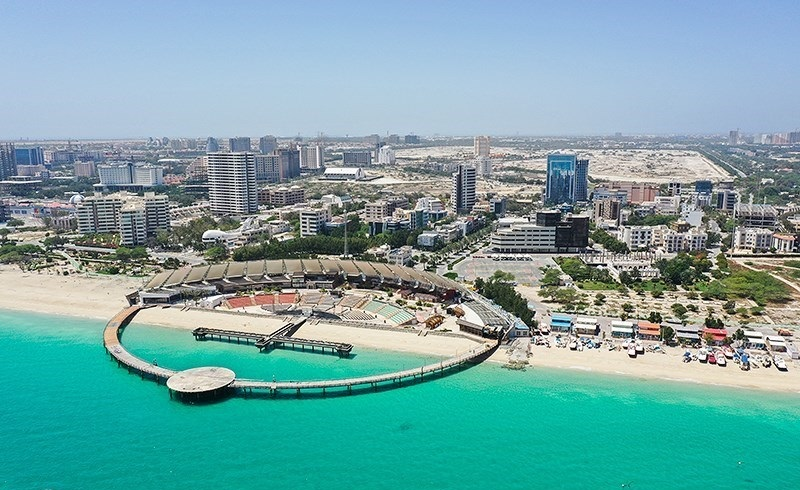
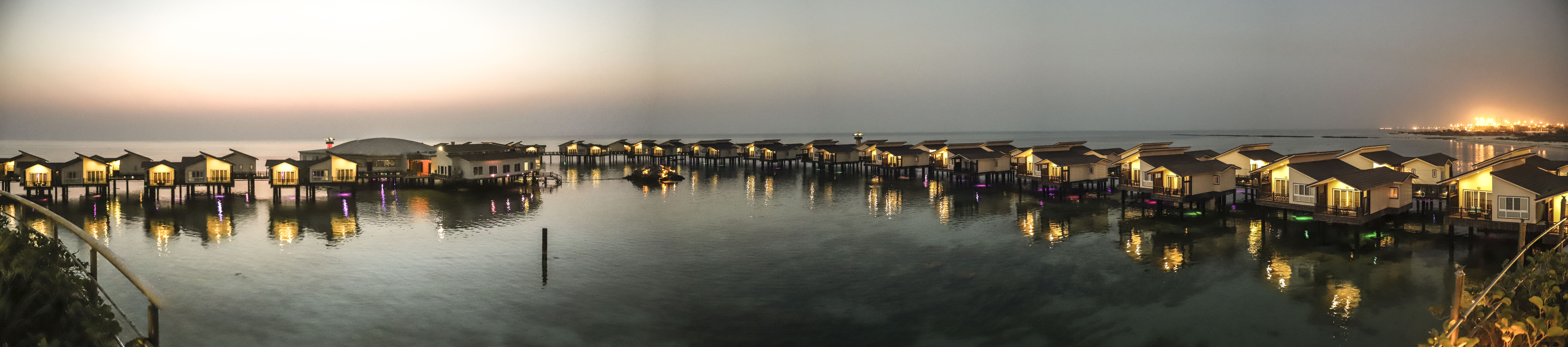
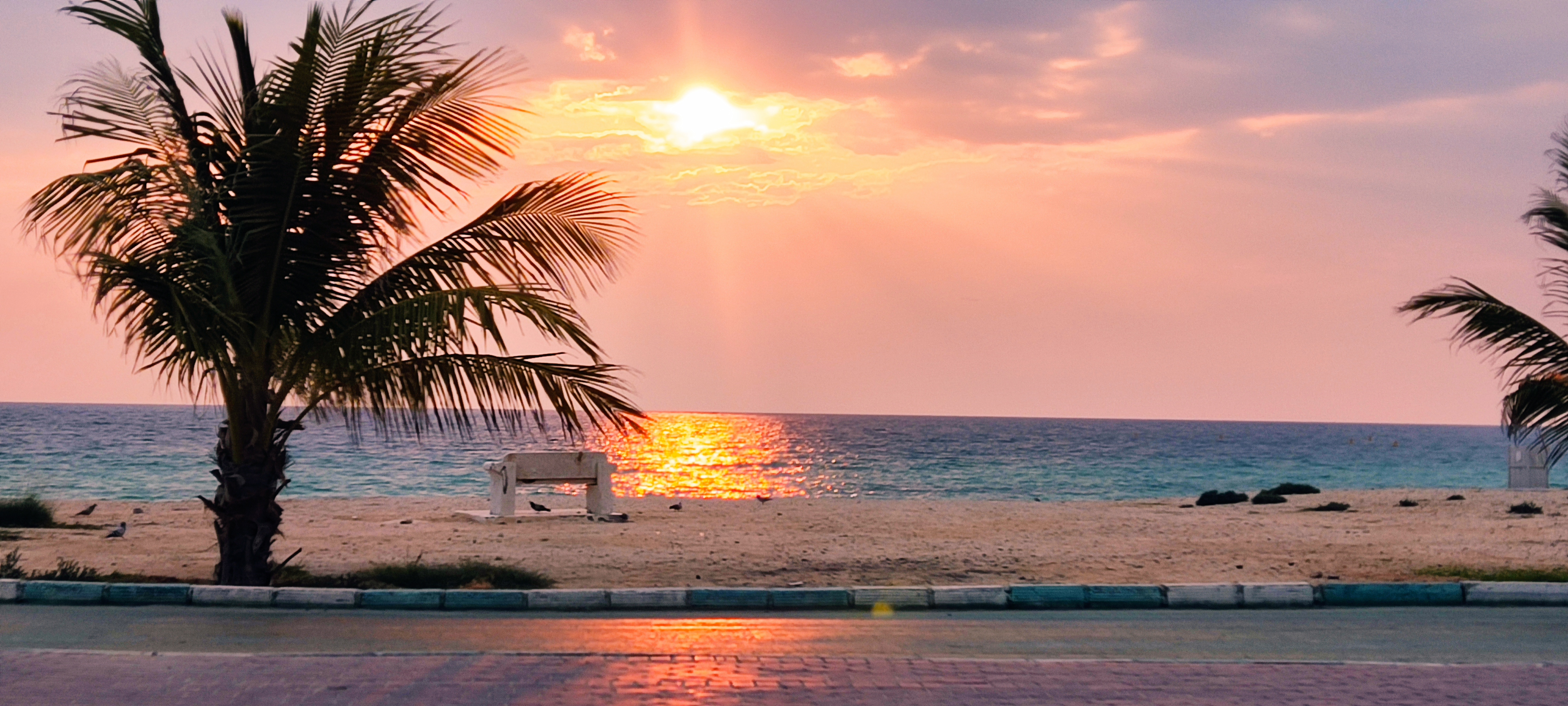
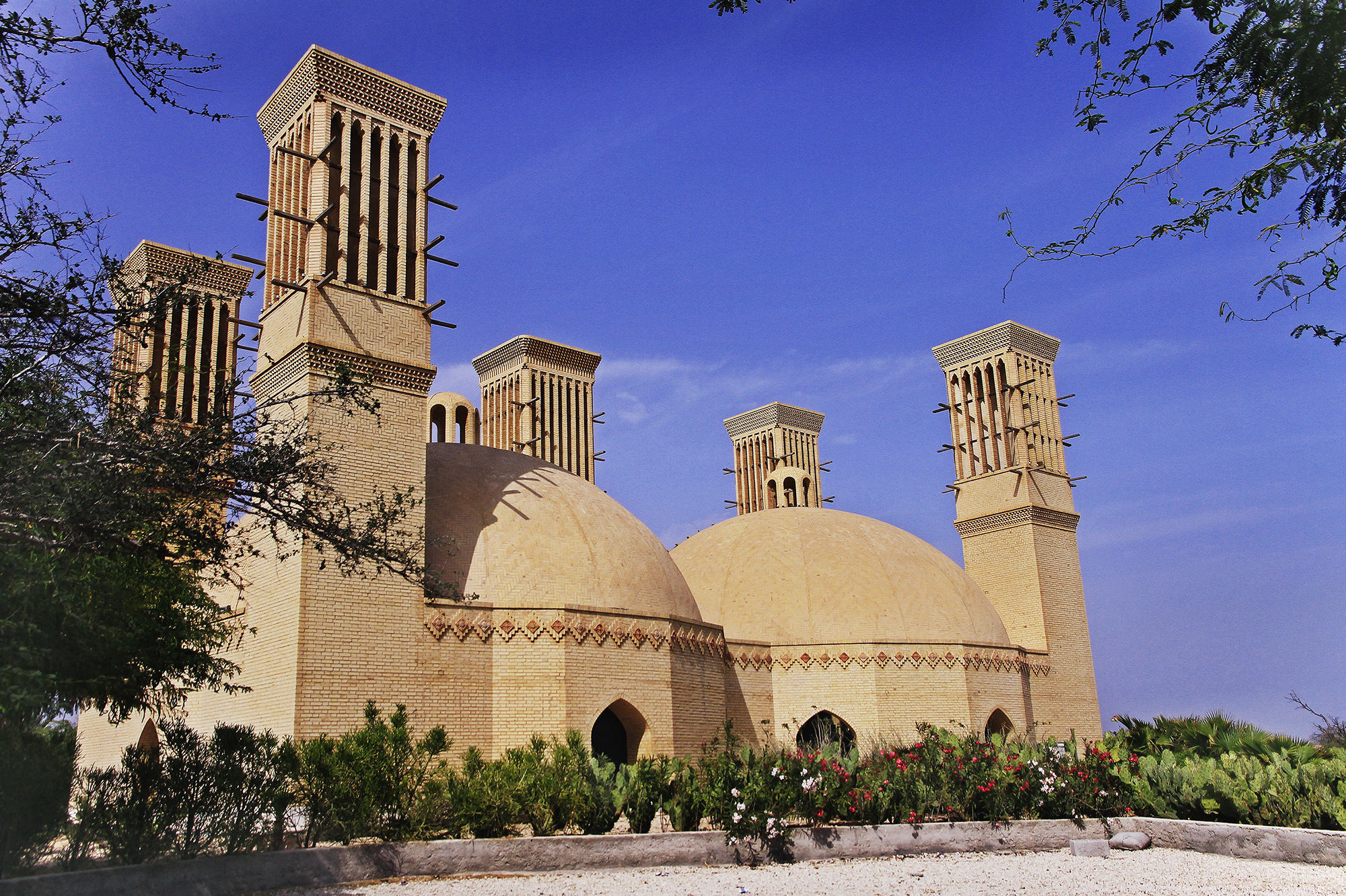
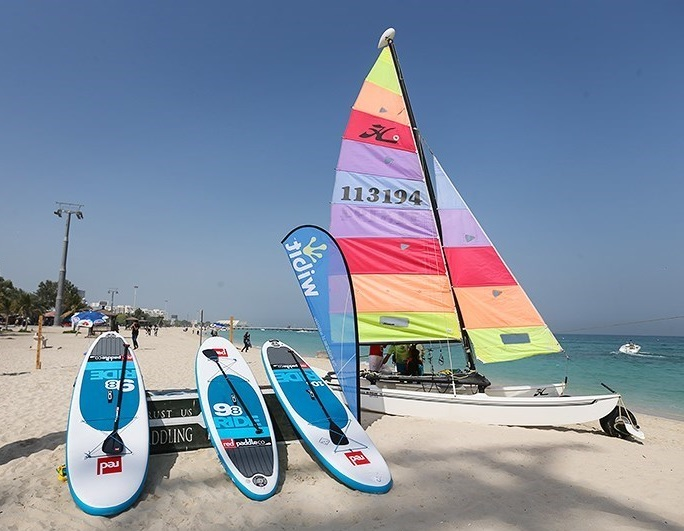
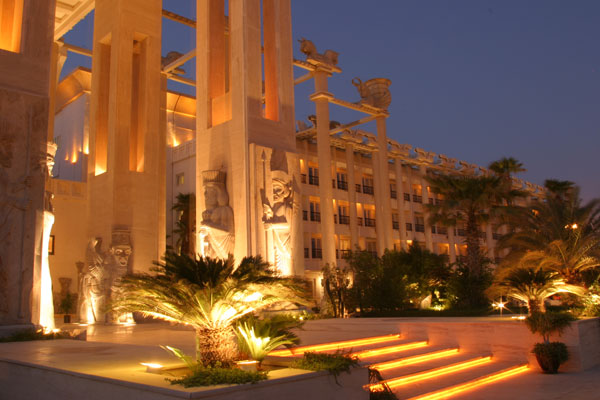
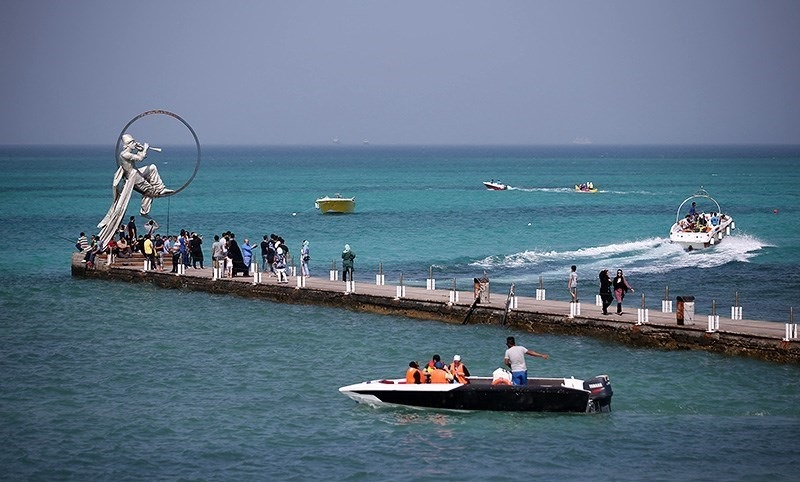
- The skyline of Kish, Toranj Marine Hotel, Dariush Grand Hotel, Harireh old city, Kish in Norouz Holidays
- Nickname: Pearl of the Persian Gulf
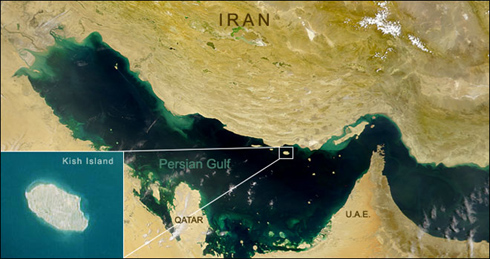

- Location within Iran Location within Persian Gulf
- Coordinates: 26.535°N 53.975°E
- Country: Iran
- Province: Hormozgān Province
- County: Bandar Lengeh County
- District: Kish District
- City: Kish

Government
  - Head of Free-Trade Zone: Mohammad Kabiri

Area
  - Land: 91.5 km^{2} (35.3 sq mi)

Population (2024)
  - Total: 55,205
- Time zone: UTC+3:30 (IRST)
- Website: Kish Free Zone Organization

Kish (Persian: کیش) is a 91.5-square-kilometre (35.3 mi^{2}) resort island in Bandar Lengeh County, Hormozgan Province, off the southern coast of Iran in the Persian Gulf. The island's population center is the city of Kish. Owing to its free trade zone status, the island is marketed as a consumers' paradise, offering shopping centers, tourist attractions, and resort hotels. It has an estimated population of around 55,205 residents and about 12 million visitors annually.

== History ==
Kish Island has been referred to by various names throughout history, including Kamtina, Arakia (Ancient Greek: Ἀρακία), Arakata, and Ghiss.

According to Iranian linguist Zana Vahdat, a former historical name of the island was Dowlatkhaneh, a name commonly used during the period of the Atabegs of Fars.

In 325 BC, Alexander the Great commissioned his admiral Nearchus to explore the Persian Gulf and the Sea of Oman. Nearchus's writings on Arakata contain the earliest known mention of Kish Island in antiquity.^{[1]} Later, Marco Polo noted in accounts of his travels to the Chinese Imperial Court that the pearls worn by the empress originated from Kish.^{[2]}

=== Modern era ===
Following the early 20th century, Kish began to attract interest for its potential as a resort destination. In 1972, during the reign of Mohammad Reza Pahlavi, the Kish Development Organisation was established with the goal of transforming the island into a major luxury tourism hub. In 1989, ministerial approval was granted for the creation of a special industrial trade zone. In 1992, the Kish Free Trade Organisation was established. Since then, Kish has seen significant investment in infrastructure, helping it emerge as one of Iran's principal commercial and tourist centres.

In March 2007, retired FBI agent turned private investigator Robert Levinson disappeared while on Kish Island during a meeting with American fugitive Dawud Salahuddin. The incident garnered international attention and remains unresolved.

In July 2019, British singer Joss Stone was denied entry to the island by Iranian officials, who claimed she lacked the necessary documentation. Stone later alleged that authorities were concerned she might attempt to perform publicly, in contravention of Iranian laws regarding female performers.

=== Harireh ===
Harireh is an ancient 8th century city located in what is now Kish, Iran. It is situated in the center of the northern coast of the island. Its area is about 3 square kilometres (1.2 sq mi).

== Geography ==
Kish is located in the Persian Gulf, 19 km (12 mi) from mainland Iran, and has an area of approximately 91 km^{2} (35 sq mi) with a 40 km (25 mi) coastline, and a nearly elliptical shape.

=== Climate, nature, and geobotany ===
Kish is located on a narrow strip of tropical vegetation in the Northern Hemisphere, with the Persian plateau to the north and the Arabian Peninsula to the south.

Kish's environment

=== Weather ===
Kish has a very dry semi-equatorial climate. The median annual rainfall in Kish is 145 mm (5.7 in) (54% in winter, 28% in autumn, and 14% in summer). The median annual temperature is 26.6 °C (79.9 °F). Kish has typical island humidity except in cold seasons. The humidity is approximately 60% for most of the year.

From October to April, Kish's weather is mild, ranging from 18 °C (64 °F) to 25 °C (77 °F). From June to August, summer temperatures are extremely hot and humid with temperatures often exceeding 40 °C (104 °F) with lows of not less than 26 °C (79 °F). The island's temperature varies from very hot to moderately hot, accompanied by relatively high humidity, often interspersed by heavy rains of short durations in certain seasons.

With the exception of some southeastern coastal areas and a few other islands in the Persian Gulf, Kish Island has the most sunny hours in the region, roughly 3,100 hours per year. Based on climatological classification and general weather conditions, Kish's proximity to the Tropic of Cancer and its exposure to high tropical pressure systems, and its position amidst hot and shallow waters, means the island tends to be hot and humid most of the year.

Climate data for Kish Island (1991–2020)
Month	Jan	Feb	Mar	Apr	May	Jun	Jul	Aug	Sep	Oct	Nov	Dec	Year
Record high °C (°F)	28.2 (82.8)	31.0 (87.8)	36.0 (96.8)	41.6 (106.9)	44.0 (111.2)	46.2 (115.2)	46.2 (115.2)	44.5 (112.1)	41.6 (106.9)	40.0 (104.0)	35.4 (95.7)	32.0 (89.6)	46.2 (115.2)
Mean daily maximum °C (°F)	22.8 (73.0)	23.8 (74.8)	26.5 (79.7)	31.3 (88.3)	35.6 (96.1)	37.2 (99.0)	38.0 (100.4)	38.0 (100.4)	36.5 (97.7)	34.2 (93.6)	29.7 (85.5)	25.2 (77.4)	31.6 (88.9)
Daily mean °C (°F)	19.2 (66.6)	20.0 (68.0)	22.3 (72.1)	26.1 (79.0)	29.9 (85.8)	32.0 (89.6)	33.6 (92.5)	34.0 (93.2)	32.4 (90.3)	29.8 (85.6)	25.5 (77.9)	21.4 (70.5)	27.2 (81.0)
Mean daily minimum °C (°F)	16.5 (61.7)	17.1 (62.8)	19.1 (66.4)	22.4 (72.3)	25.7 (78.3)	28.0 (82.4)	30.3 (86.5)	30.9 (87.6)	29.1 (84.4)	26.3 (79.3)	22.3 (72.1)	18.6 (65.5)	23.9 (75.0)
Record low °C (°F)	9.0 (48.2)	9.8 (49.6)	12.2 (54.0)	16.4 (61.5)	19.0 (66.2)	24.0 (75.2)	24.8 (76.6)	27.3 (81.1)	23.9 (75.0)	18.0 (64.4)	15.8 (60.4)	12.0 (53.6)	9.0 (48.2)
Average precipitation mm (inches)	34.0 (1.34)	21.7 (0.85)	26.2 (1.03)	5.7 (0.22)	0.4 (0.02)	0.3 (0.01)	1.9 (0.07)	0.1 (0.00)	0.2 (0.01)	2.4 (0.09)	23.1 (0.91)	42.5 (1.67)	158.5 (6.24)
Average precipitation days (≥ 1.0 mm)	3.1	2.2	2.8	0.9	0.1	0.1	0.1	0.0	0.0	0.2	1.6	2.9	14.0
Average relative humidity (%)	65.0	67.0	68.0	64.0	63.0	69.0	70.0	71.0	72.0	66.0	60.0	64.0	66.6
Average dew point °C (°F)	12.2 (54.0)	13.3 (55.9)	15.7 (60.3)	18.0 (64.4)	21.2 (70.2)	25.1 (77.2)	27.0 (80.6)	27.7 (81.9)	26.3 (79.3)	22.4 (72.3)	16.7 (62.1)	13.9 (57.0)	20.0 (68.0)
Mean monthly sunshine hours	234.0	221.0	237.0	255.0	319.0	317.0	295.0	292.0	284.0	292.0	253.0	238.0	3,237
Source: NOAA

=== Tourist attractions ===
The Greek Ship

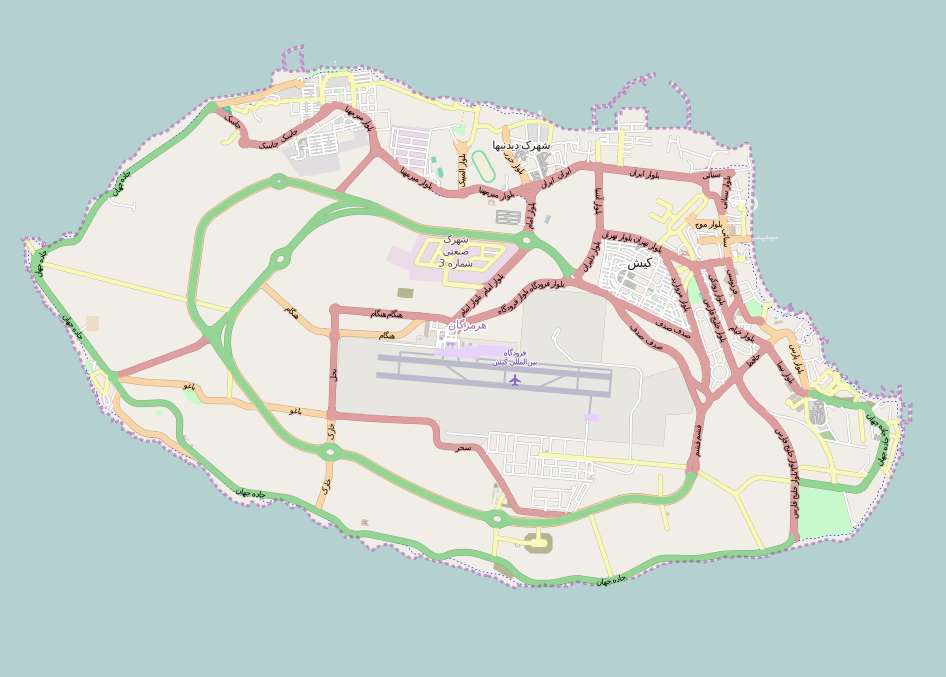
A map of Kish

The Greek Ship is the wreck of a 1943 cargo steamship, the Koula F, on a beach on Kish's southwest coast. She was originally a British ship, Empire Trumpet, and was built in Scotland. In 1966, she ran aground and all attempts to salvage her failed.

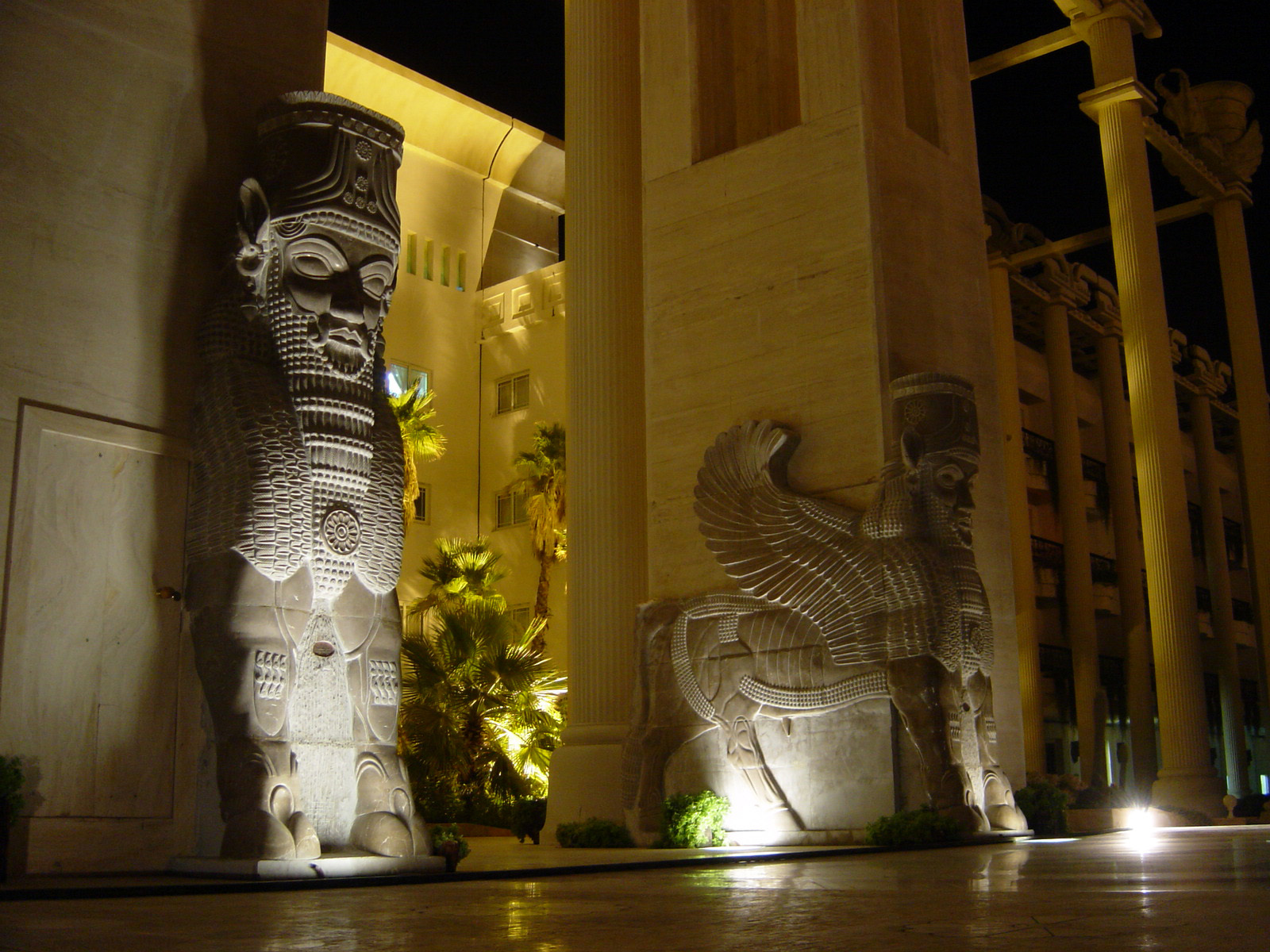
Dariush Grand Hotel in Kish

== Economy ==
Since the mid-1990s, the Iranian government has embarked on an aggressive campaign to position Kish as a rival to Dubai and Doha. The campaign has included massive construction projects and programs designed to attract foreign investment and trade.

Within the area of the Kish Free Zone, as it is known, the standard laws of the Islamic Republic of Iran are far more relaxed than on the mainland. This has resulted in more domestic tourism and international trade on the island. Kish's population includes both Muslims and Christians. In 2009, the total foreign trade of the Kish Free Zone was approximately $9.2 billion per annum. Fifteen percent of all imports to Iran are through Kish.

Investment incentives in the Kish free trade zone include:

- 15 years tax-exemption;
- no entry visa requirement;
- 100% foreign ownership possible;
- flexible monetary & banking services;
- extended legal guarantees & protection.

Besides the existing Iranian Oil Bourse, a new exchange, the Kish Stock Exchange was inaugurated in 2010 to facilitate foreign investment and monetary activities.

== Education ==
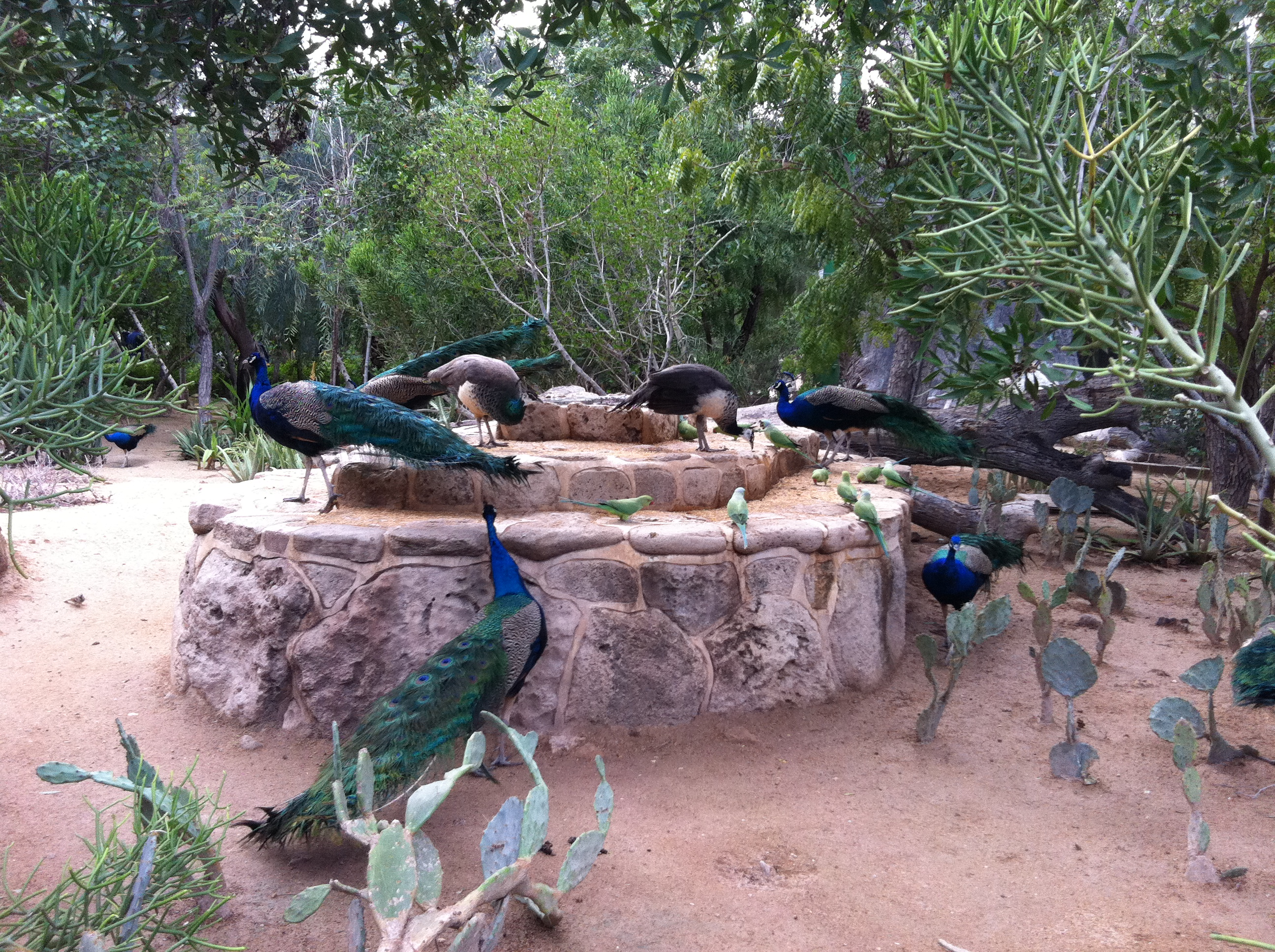
The Kish Island Bird Garden, 2014

Sharif University of Technology-International Campus-Kish was established in 1995. Kish International Campus, University of Tehran was established in 2007.

The KFZO, or Kish Free Zone Organization, has built new schools with priority given to technical and vocational courses.

- Kish Institute of Arts and Sciences (teaching foreign languages);
- Kish Institute of Graph-Rayaneh (teaching computing);
- Parto Institute (teaching English);
- Sadaf Cultural Centre;
- Mir Mohana Cultural Centre;
- Sana'ei Cultural Centre; and
- Kish Institute of Science and Technology.

== Transportation ==
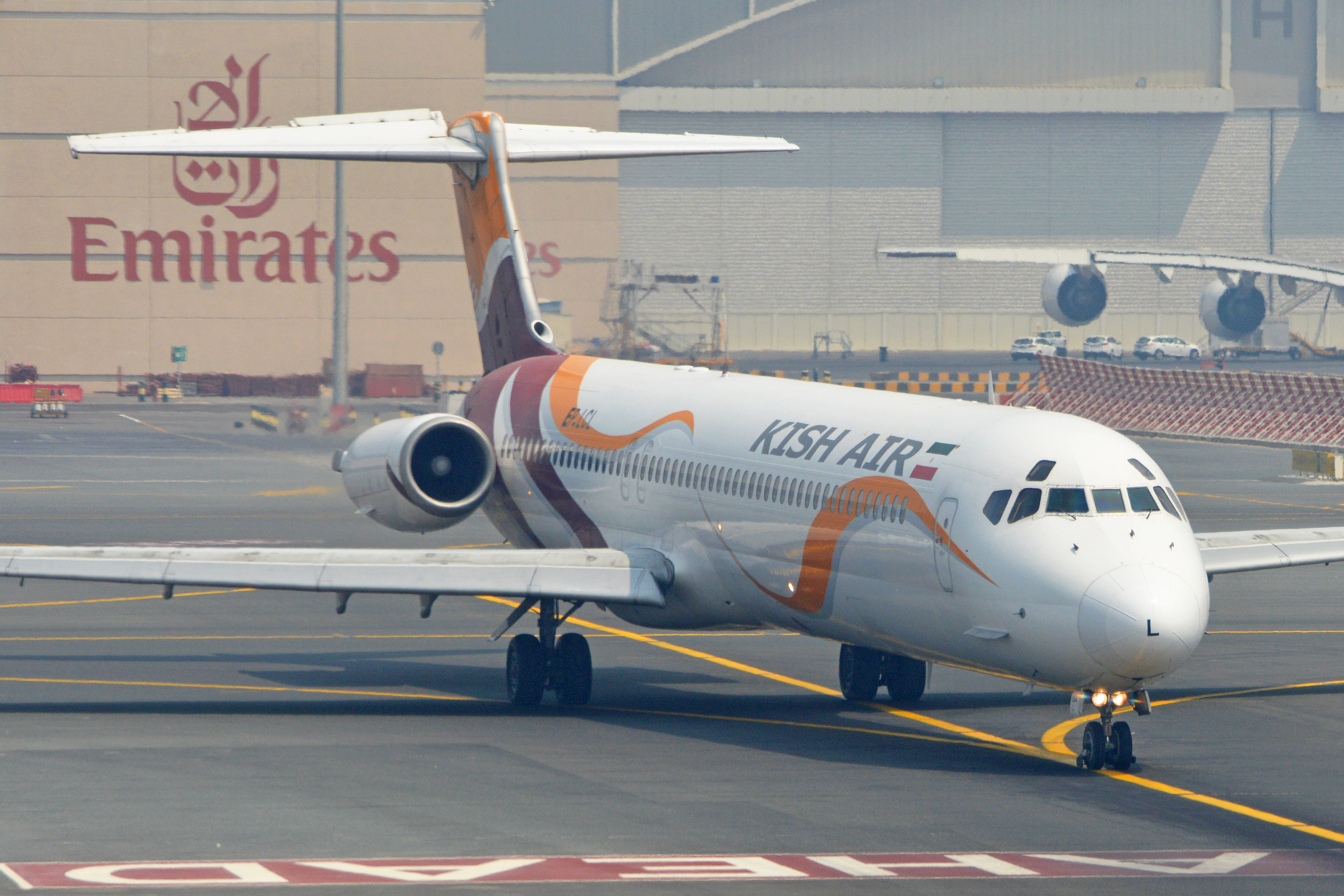
Kish Air

People travel to Kish by sea via Kish port, or by air through Kish airport. Kish International Airport is the main entry point for tourists who come to Kish Island.

In 2015, a new terminal was planned that would turn Kish International Airport into the second-largest airport in Iran, with a 4.5 million passengers capacity per year. 2.7 million passengers travelled through the airport in 2015.

== Sports ==
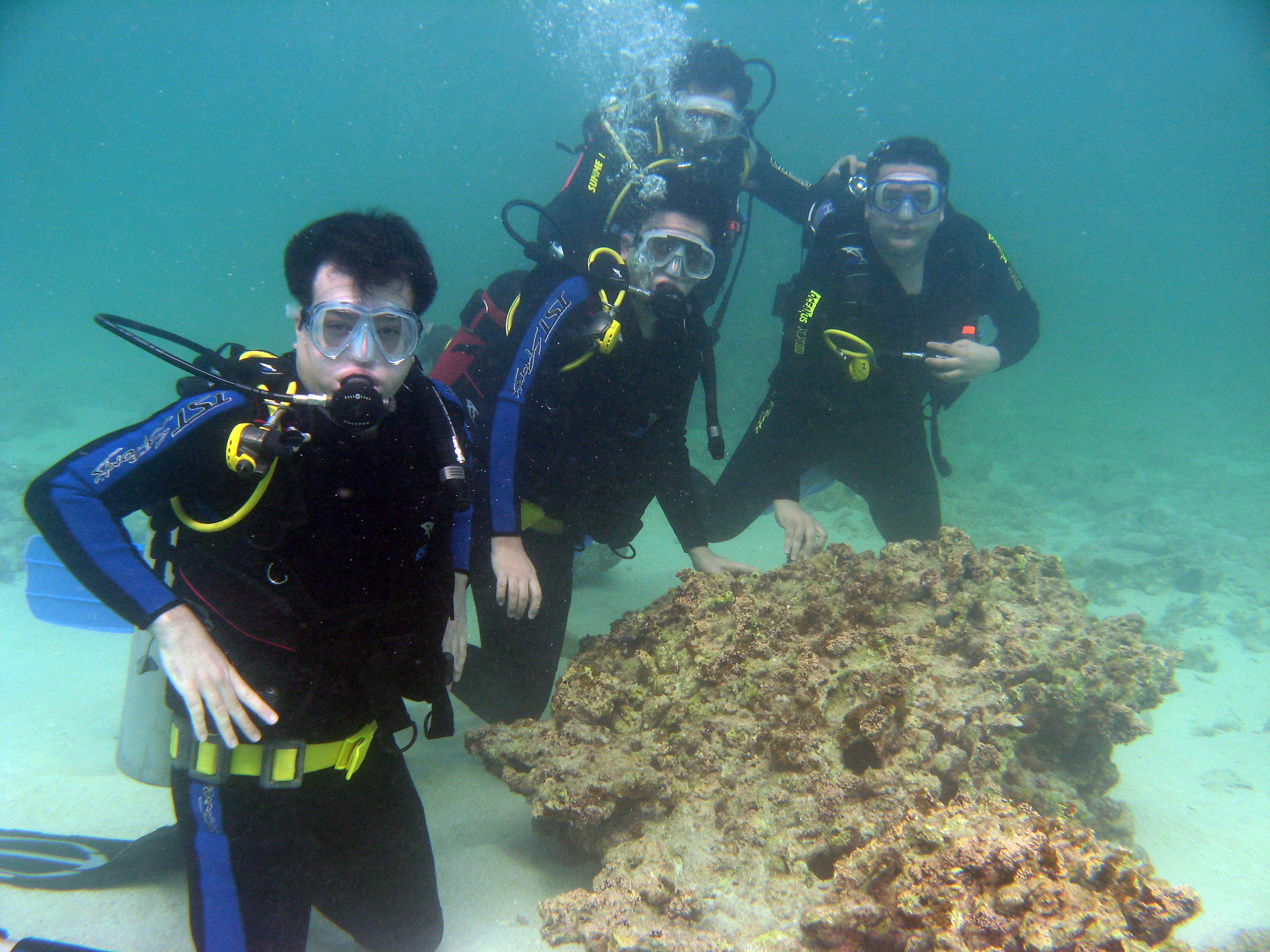
Scuba diving on Kish Island

Kish Island hosts the Fajr International Squash Championship, part of the Professional Squash Association's annual tour. Kish also holds Iran's Traditional and Heroic Games Contests. Kish is home to a multi-purpose stadium seating 1,200 spectators. Water sports are offered in Kish. Kish Island has hosted the 2006 Asian Beach Volleyball Championship.

Kish was host to an officially sanctioned FIVB beach volleyball event, the Kish Island Open 2016. Qualification rounds at the 2017 FIVB Beach Volleyball World Tour event took place on Kish.

The island held Kish beach Games 2023 through a private budget.

== Major Kish Island projects ==
=== International Oil Bourse ===
The International Oil Bourse is a commodity exchange which opened in 2008.

=== Ocean Water Park ===
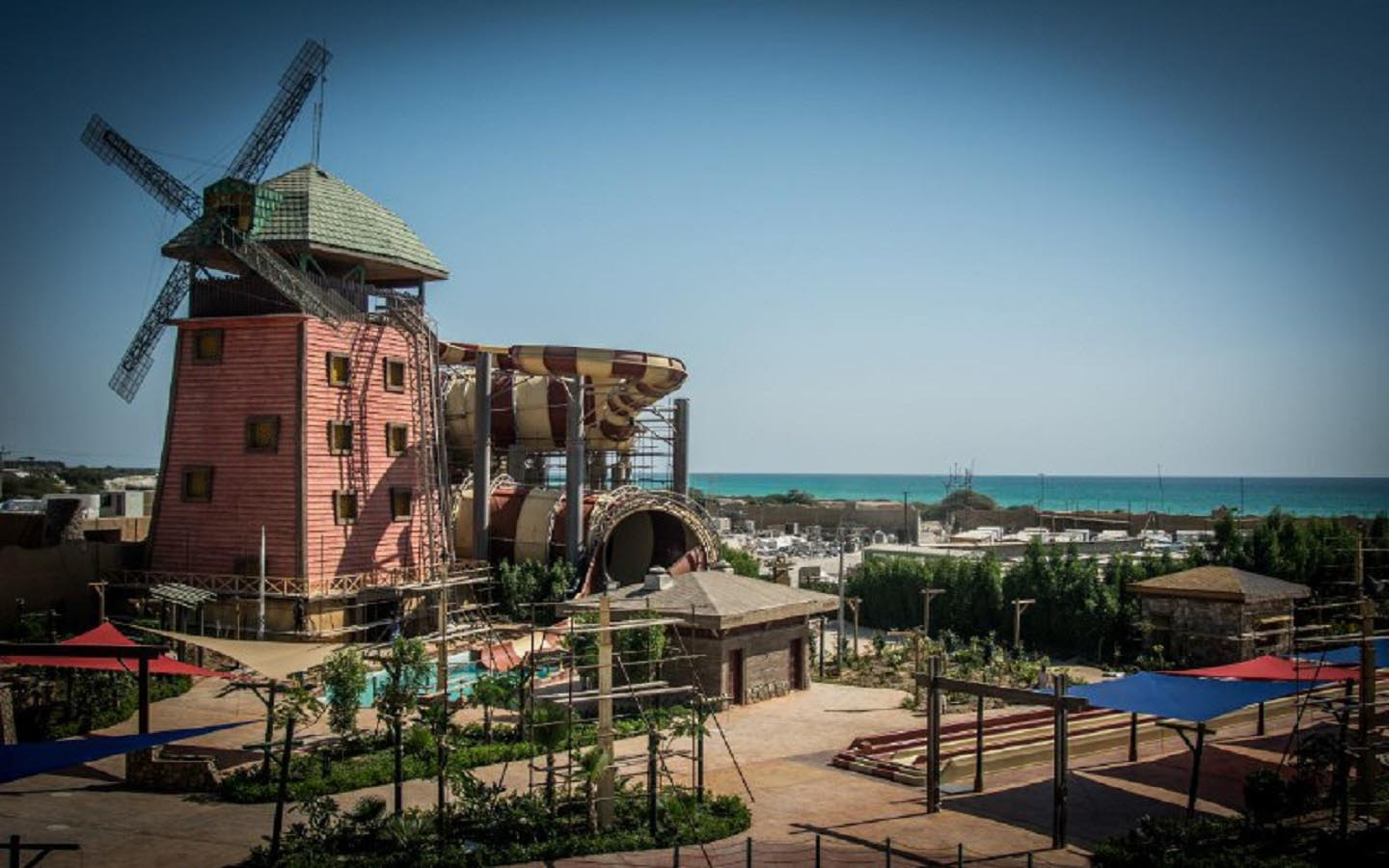
Ocean Water Park

Ocean Water Park is a 5.6-hectare (14-acre) water park.

=== Kish Dolphin Park ===
The Dolphin Park is a 70-hectare (170-acre) park located at the southeast corner of Kish Island. It is surrounded by over 22,000 palm trees and includes a dolphinarium, butterfly garden, silkworm compound, bird garden, artificial rain forest, volcanic mountain, orchid garden, and cactus garden. The dolphinarium includes the largest man-made pool on the island and it exhibits dolphins, sea lions, and white whales. The Bird Garden in the park is home to more than 57 species of birds and other animals from around the world, including pelicans, ostriches, blue-and-yellow macaws, storks, toco toucans, turacos, swans, African penguins, and marsh crocodiles.

=== Kish Aquarium ===
The Art Center on the island includes an aquarium that displays marine species unique to the Persian Gulf.

=== Kish Cable-car Station ===
Mica Mall Kish with an infrastructure of about 195 thousand square meters has been built on an area of about 37 thousand square meters, this complex is one of the largest commercial and recreational projects available on Kish Island. About 15,000 square meters of this complex are related to recreational facilities.

=== Kariz Underground City ===
The underground city of Kariz is also known as a strange city located 16 meters deep in the ground. This city is a very large aqueduct with an area of about 10,000 square meters and is known as the underground city of Kariz. The walls and roof of this city are made of shells.

=== Portuguese Valley ===
Portuguese Valley; evokes the atmosphere of war on Kish Island. In the past, the Portuguese lived in this valley, which is called the Portuguese Valley. The pleasant climate and lush landscape have made the Portuguese Valley one of the most visited places in Kish in the summer.

== Twin towns – sister cities ==
- Langkawi, Malaysia (since 2009)
- Dubai, United Arab Emirates (since 2002)
- Lapu-Lapu City, Philippines (since 2024)

== See also ==
- Bandar Lengeh
- Chabahar Free Trade-Industrial Zone, another free trade zone in Iran
- Flower of the East, a proposed luxury hotel development on Kish Island
- Kish airshow, a semi-regular international airshow held on Kish Island
- Kish Air, a domestic airline serving Kish Island

General:

- Economy of Iran
- Foreign Direct Investment in Iran
