= Blue Ash (disambiguation) =

Blue ash, Fraxinus quadrangulata, is a species of ash native primarily to the Midwestern United States.

Blue Ash may also refer to:

- Fraxinus pennsylvanica, a tree native to eastern and central North America
- Blue Ash, Ohio, a city located in Hamilton County, Ohio
  - Blue Ash Air Station, an Air National Guard facility located in Blue Ash, Ohio
- Blue Ash (band), a band in the United States

== See also ==
- Blue tree (disambiguation)
- Ash (disambiguation)
