= Kish International Campus, University of Tehran =

University campus on Kish Island

University of Tehran Kish International Campus
- دانشگاه تهران پردیس بین الملل کیش; Dāneshgāh-e Tehran
- Motto: میاسای ز آموختن یک زمان
- Motto in English: Rest not a moment from learning
- Type: Public
- Established: 2007
- Affiliations: University of Tehran
- Chancellor: Dr Zargham
- Students: ~2500
- Location: Kish Island, Hormozgan, Iran; 26°33′58.65″N 53°57′19.63″E
- Campus: Urban, 3.5 ha
- Language: English language
- Colours: Blue
- Website: www.kish.ut.ac.ir www.ut.ac.ir

University of Tehran's International Campus - Kish Island is located on Kish Island. The official language of the Kish International Campus is English and all courses are offered in English.

== Conferences ==
The campus hosted the 14/6/2012 South Asian Teaching Session on International Humanitarian Law organized by the International Committee of the Red Cross, attended by seventy experts from eleven Asian countries.

== Departments ==
- Engineering
- Fine Arts
- Law
- Management
- English
- Physical Education and Sports Sciences
- Economics
- Science and Biotechnology

== Degree programs ==
UT Kish International Campus offers the following degree programs:

=== Bachelor's Degree ===
- Architecture
- Industrial Design
- Painting
- Urbanism
- Engineering (Computer, Industrial, or Electrical)
- Financial Management
- Accounting
- Industrial Management
- Law

=== Master's Degree ===
- Financial Management
- MBA
- Sports Science and Physical Education
- Economic Sciences
- Accounting
- Industrial Management
- Tourism Management
- Geography (Tourism Planning)
- Graphics (Visual Communication)
- Architecture
- Industrial Design
- Visual Arts
- Painting
- Music Composing
- Urban Planning
- Urban Design
- Industrial Engineering
- Computer Engineering
- Information Technology
- Information Security
- Polymer Engineering
- Electrical Engineering
- Chemical Engineering (Hydrocarbon Reservoirs, Mechatronics)
- Cell and Molecular Sciences (Biology)
- Persian Literature
- English Literature
- TEFL
- International Law
- Public Law
- Private Law
- Environmental Design

=== PhD ===
- TEFL
- English Literature
- Persian Literature
- International Law
- Public Law
- Sports Sciences and Physical Education
- Corrective Exercise and Sports Injuries
- Sports Management
- Accounting
- Management (Finance, Research in Operation, Media, Production & Operations, Business)

== Cancer research ==
Advanced studies conducted in Effect of Combination Exercise Training on Metabolic Syndrome Parameters in Postmenopausal Women with Breast Cancer were conducted at the UT's Kish International Campus have been registered with the United States Library of Medicine, National Institutes of Health.
