= Justin Uy =

Filipino businessman

- Born: Justin Sy Uy; 1960 or 1961 (age 63–64); Cebu, Philippines
- Education: University of San Carlos (BS)
- Occupation: Businessman
- Known for: Founder and chairman of Profood International Corp.

Justin Sy Uy is a Filipino businessman known for being the founder of dried mango firm Profood International Inc.

== Early life and education ==
Justin Uy was born in Cebu to a large Chinese Filipino family having 10 other siblings. His father was a salesman at a Manila-based cigarette family and his mother was a housewife. He pursued a college degree in chemical engineering at the University of San Carlos, intending to join his father's company but such plan did not materialize.

== Career ==
Uy in high school partnered with a brother to set up shell craft fashion accessory business but closed it. He would get involved in other ventures such as poultry and mushroom farming. He would later find potential in dried mangoes.

In 1980, Uy founded Profood International Inc. when he was 19 years old which would become known for its dried and processed fruits products, including the "Philippine Brand Dried Mangoes". Initially, he had trouble in establishing his business domestically so he focused on producing products for export. He set up a manufacturing plant in Cambodia to process Philippine-produced mangoes into dried fruit. As of 2022, Profood's products is available in around 50 countries. He is also involved in retail having built the J Centre Mall (acquired since 2023 by SM Prime and now known as SM J Mall) and invested in BXT Corporation which runs the Jpark Island Resort & Waterpark.
