= Blue tree =

Blue tree may refer to:

- Blue Tree, a New York City boutique owned by actress Phoebe Cates
- Bluetree, a Northern-Irish Christian band
- Blue Tree Phuket, a community center in Phuket, Thailand
- The Blue Trees, a 2000 album by Welsh band Gorky's Zygotic Mynci
- The Blue Trees (Dimopoulos), a performance and installation artwork by Konstantin Dimopoulos

== See also ==
- Blue ash Fraxinus quadrangulata, a type of tree
- Blue spruce Picea pungens, a type of tree
- Aoki (surname), a Japanese surname meaning "blue tree"
