= Felix Tiu =

Filipino-Chinese businessman, investor, and entrepreneur

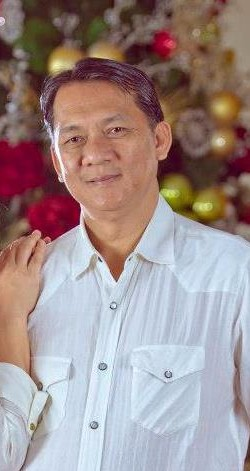
- Born: Felicito Hupan Tiu; Iloilo City, Iloilo, Philippines Chinese
- Education: Central Philippine University
- Occupations: Founder and CEO of EON Group of Companies, chair of Iloilo City Trade and Investments Board
- Organization: EON Group of Companies
- Board member of: West Visayas State University Regents
- Spouse: Bernadette Tiu (m. 1978–present)
- Awards: Golden Salakot Award 2012

Felix Tiu (born Felicito Hupan Tiu on October 29, 1955, in Iloilo City, Philippines) is a Filipino–Chinese businessman, investor, and entrepreneur. Since 2010, he has been chairman of the Iloilo City Trade and Investment Board (ICTIPB) and the CEO and founder of Eon Group of Companies which holds the first waterpark in the Visayas, and the first to run solar-powered in the Philippines, WaterWorld Iloilo.

Beneath the corporation, are varying establishments such as a tourism agency, multiple hospitality businesses, food establishments, candy, juice and noodle manufacturing, and developments of housing and property. The EON Group of Companies is known as "one of the top developers in Iloilo. "

Tiu has been awarded the Golden Salakot Award, which is "the highest honor in recognition for outstanding achievements defined by personal or institutional success and philanthropic involvement", by the Iloilo City mayor, Jed Patrick Mabilog in 2012. Tiu has been the centre of interviews from high-profile media outlets such as Rappler.com and ABS-CBN.

Announced in late 2017, Tiu invested 350 million pesos into another branch of WaterWorld in Mandaue, Cebu, making it one of the most expensive waterparks in the Philippines. Not only will it be one of the largest waterparks in the Philippines, the 3-hectare project would boast as a major entertainment complex, houses a large amusement park, and resort.

== Early life ==
Tiu was born in Iloilo City, Iloilo, Philippines to Luz Tiu (née Hupan) and Fernando Tiu, a wealthy family of Chinese descent, who were successful, self-made traders who operated a candy store in Iloilo, throughout the 1950s. Felix's grandparents were Chinese immigrants, with ancestral ties from the Fujian province, who migrated to the Philippines due to business opportunities in the 1900s.

He finished his high school education at Central Philippine University.

Tiu's father's business shut down because of mismanagement due to overexpansion, resulting in Felix, the eldest of four, to drop out of private school in 1974 to assist in the re-enterprising of his father's business.

In 1979, at 23, he married Bernadette Tiu, (née Chavez) and a fast growing family did not come far after: by 1987, Felix and Bernadette already had 4 children. During the early years of assistance in the restoration of his father's business, Felix and his wife, Bernadette, having to provide for their young family, sold homemade tamarind balls, halo halo and other local sweets on the streets of Iloilo City, to cope with financial struggles after the disperse of his father's fortune.

Tiu is also the grandfather of Filipino social media influencer and host, Joaquin Tiu.

== Career ==
=== 1980s–2000s: Early Career ===
Upon the aftermath of the failed reestablishment of his father's confectionery business, Tiu and his wife founded their own trading company, in 1985, Goldstar Philippine Traders, selling oil, flour, margarine, and other baking goods using his savings of ₱10,000 from previous business ventures.

Felix opened Eon Philippines Industries Corporation (EPIC), in 1995, which manufactured various local staples like bihon and sotanghon as well as flavoured juices, with lollipops being the main product. This venture was established as a reminiscent to Felix's father's business, then in 1998, Felix opened a travel and tourism agency called Eon Travel and Tours (ETT) in SM City Iloilo. As of 2024, Eon Travel and Tours has earned numerous awards and opened branches throughout Iloilo, Metro Manila, and Metro Cebu. Both EPIC and ETT are still in business more than two decades later.

In 1991, with a vision to provide "market vendors a chance at their businesses" and to support other local businesses, Tiu ventured into low interest lending and in 5 years has created a "very modest lending portfolio".

=== 2000s–2010s: Eon Group of Companies and Local ventures ===
At the turn of the millennium, in 2000, Tiu purchased a property and constructed the Eon Centennial Plaza Hotel, which is now known as "one of the leading business hotels in the heart of Iloilo", accommodating multiple restaurants over the years such as Frances, Joaqui's, Cups n’ Saucers, and more recently, The Leaf.

Eon Realty Development Corporation started in 2001 and has built over 4,500 homes to date, with families in the low-medium income bracket as their target market. As of 2024, they encompass over 16 housing and subdivision projects and became the first company to build on townhouses in Iloilo.

In 2004, Eon Group of Companies branched out into developing neighboring islands, launching Guimaras Memorial Park in Guimaras, Philippines.

In 2006, Eon Centennial Resort Hotel and Convention Center was erected in Jaro, Iloilo City, which housed a convention center to hold up to 3,000 people. Exploreiloilo.com has named Centennial Resort Hotel and Convention Center "a first class year-round family destination". In 2015, the announcement of Waterworld Iloilo resulted in the revision of the convention center, leading the enterprise to change its name to Eon Centennial Resort Hotel and Waterpark.

=== 2010s-2020s: Waterworld Franchise ===
In 2013, Tiu opened the first paninda and paluto style restaurant in Iloilo, Merkado Seafood Restaurant, where an inclusive wet market allows fresh seafood, meat and vegetables to be purchased, with the customer deciding how it is to be cooked. Due to Typhoon Yolanda's impact on Panay's fresh seafood supply, infection led to the restaurant closing its doors on November that year.

WaterWorld Iloilo was announced in 2015, to replace the convention center constructed under the then-named, Centennial Resort Hotel and Convention Center in Jaro, Iloilo City. It opened on December 16, 2016, and became Philippines' first solar-powered waterpark. It comprises over 20 different slides and rides, 2 pools, 8 luxury cabanas, 3 restaurants, a souvenir and novelty shop, and a lazy river which surrounds the perimeter of the park. WaterWorld Iloilo has been featured in various media outlets such as Panay News, The Guardian, The Iloilo Metropolitan Times, Island Living and Hugging Horizons.

Due to the overwhelming success of WaterWorld Iloilo, Tiu announced that the Eon Group of Companies would expand the WaterWorld franchise into Mandaue, Cebu. The project, known as WaterWorld Cebu, would be valued at over 350 million pesos, making it one of the most expensive waterparks in the Philippines. Not only would it be one of the largest waterparks in the Philippines, but the 3-hectare project would boast as a major entertainment complex, houses a large amusement park, and resort as well. It was officially opened in late 2019.

=== 2020s-present: Bernwood Franchise and Eon Builders Corporation ===
In 2021, following the successful establishment of four subdivisions under the Bernwood franchise—Bernwood Village, Bernwood Townhomes, Bernwood Residences, and Bernwood Resorts and Villas—the Eon Group of Companies announced its expansion into high-rise residential developments in Iloilo City.

The first project, Bernwood Tower, is a 15-story residential and commercial condominium. It features 379 residential units and ground-floor commercial spaces. The penthouse level is designed to host premium amenities, including a pavilion, an infinity pool, and a gym exclusively for residents. It is strategically located near the University of San Agustin, the project targets students and professionals in the surrounding area.

In April 2022, the Eon Group introduced its second high-rise project, Bernwood Centrale. This 15-story condominium will house approximately 858 units and offers an array of amenities, including a gym, a study hub, a children’s playhouse, function rooms, a swimming pool, a jogging trail, and an open garden. Situated near Central Philippine University, the project also targets students and families in the mixed commercial/residential district.

In August 2022, Eon Group established Eon Builders Corporation, an architecture, interior design, and construction firm, to serve as the construction arm for its current and future projects.

The company further expanded its portfolio in April 2024 with the opening of Waterworld Hotel Cebu. Despite construction delays caused by the COVID-19 pandemic and Typhoon Odette, the hotel launched successfully adjacent to Waterworld Cebu. It features 73 guest rooms, four function rooms, a grand ballroom with a capacity of 800 guests, and the modern-Ilonggo restaurant, Felicito's.
