= Mohammad Kabiri =

Iranian executive director and politician (born 1988)

Mohammad Jafar Kabiri

Head of Free Zone kish
- President: Masoud Pezeshkian

Deputy of Cooperative Affairs, Ministry of Cooperative, Labor and Social Welfare
- President: Hassan Rouhani
- Succeeded by

Personal details
- Born: 1988 (age 37–38)

Mohammad Jaafar Kabiri (Persian: محمد کبیری)(born in 1988) is an Iranian politician and executive director. From November 21, 2024, Kabiri has been working as the CEO of the Kish Free Zone Organization in the 14th government.

Kabiri worked as the deputy of cooperative affairs of the Ministry of Cooperation, Labor and Social Welfare in the 12th government.

Kabiri is a graduate of economics from Tehran University, he was the youngest deputy minister in the 12th cabinet at the age of 30.

== The steering council of the 14th government ==
Kabiri is also a member of the steering council of the 14th government. The task of this council is to form committees and working groups to select a list of government cabinet members to introduce to the president-elect Masoud Pezeshkian.

After running as the Minister of Cooperation, Labor and Social Welfare, Mohammad Kabiri voluntarily left the steering council of the 14th government.
