= Maros, Indonesia =

Town in Indonesia

- Interactive map of Maros, Indonesia
- Coordinates: 5°00′08″S 119°34′32″E

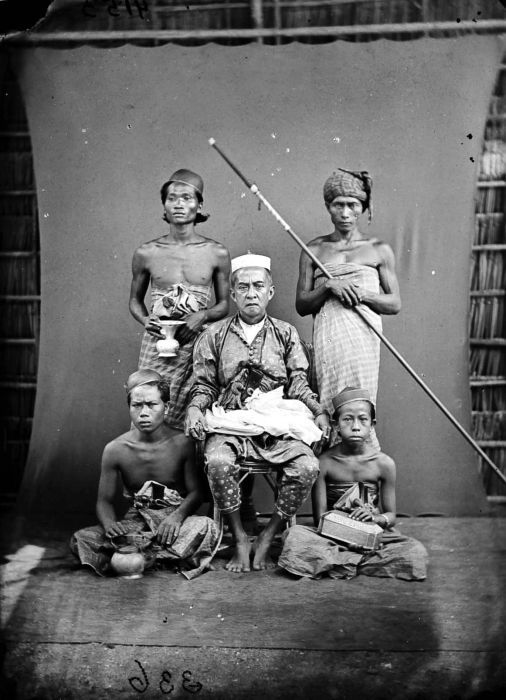
The Regent of Maros and his entourage at Makassar during Dutch colonial period

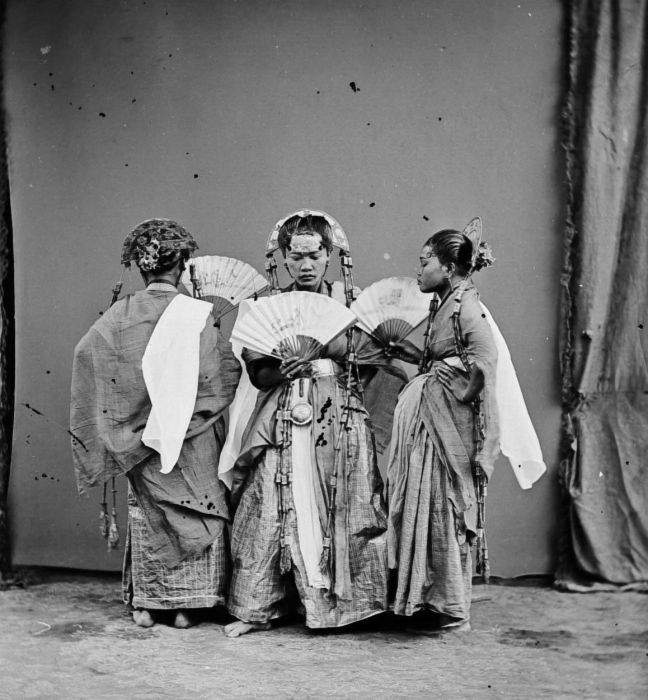
Padjoge dancers in Maros, Sulawesi (ca. 1870)

Maros is a town in the South Sulawesi province of Indonesia close to the provincial capital of Makassar. The Maros Regency has a district called Maros Baru.

Maros is the location of the Indonesian Cereals Research Institute, a branch of the Indonesian Agency for Agricultural Research and Development.

In 2012, regional cement producer PT Semen Bosowa Maros began construction in Maros of a new clinker plant estimated to cost over $300 million. The clinker plant was expected to help the cement company increase production in the region in response to the growing demand for cement to support construction activities.

Maros Water Park is in Maros.

== Rock art in caves ==
Nearby to Maros, in the area of the Maros Regency to the north of Makassar, are Pettakere cave and other prehistoric caves that contain significant rock art. Research suggests that the rock art is of considerable archaeological significance.
