= Harireh =

8th century city on present-day Kish Island, Iran

Coordinates: 26°34′N 54°00′E

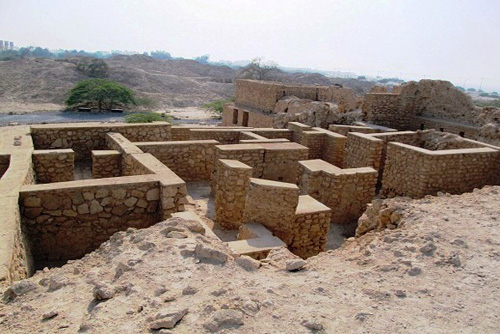
Harireh city

Harireh is an ancient 8th century city located in what is now Kish, Iran. It is situated in the center of the northern coast of the island. Its area is about 3 square kilometres (1.2 sq mi).

== History ==
Some say Harireh was first built sometime between the late Sasanid period and the early Islamic era. Harireh was quite popular during the Saljuks and Atavakan of Fars. An Iranian cultural heritage organization has verified that Harireh is at least 800 years old.

== Historical and literary references ==
Harireh is most probably the town that the renowned Iranian poet Saadi referred to in his book Gulistan. There are references in the works of Iranian and Arab historians to the location of the town on the island. These indicate that the town was situated in the middle of the northern part, precisely where the ruins are standing today.

== Gallery ==
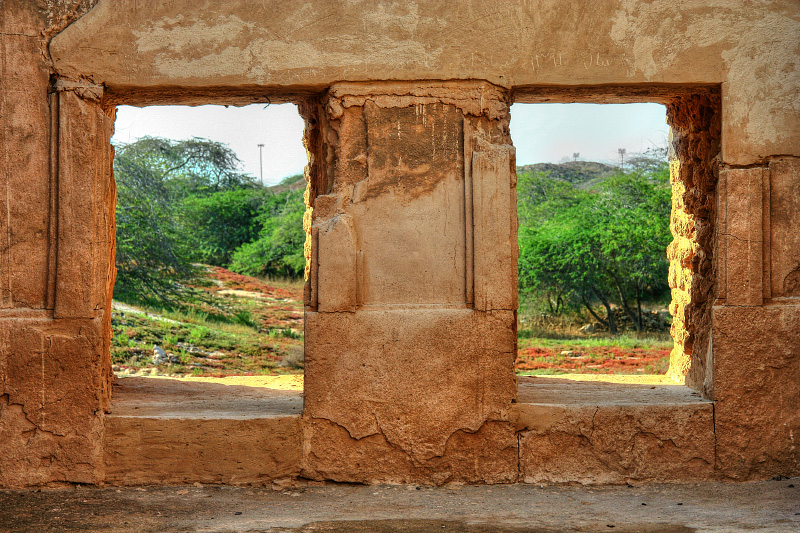

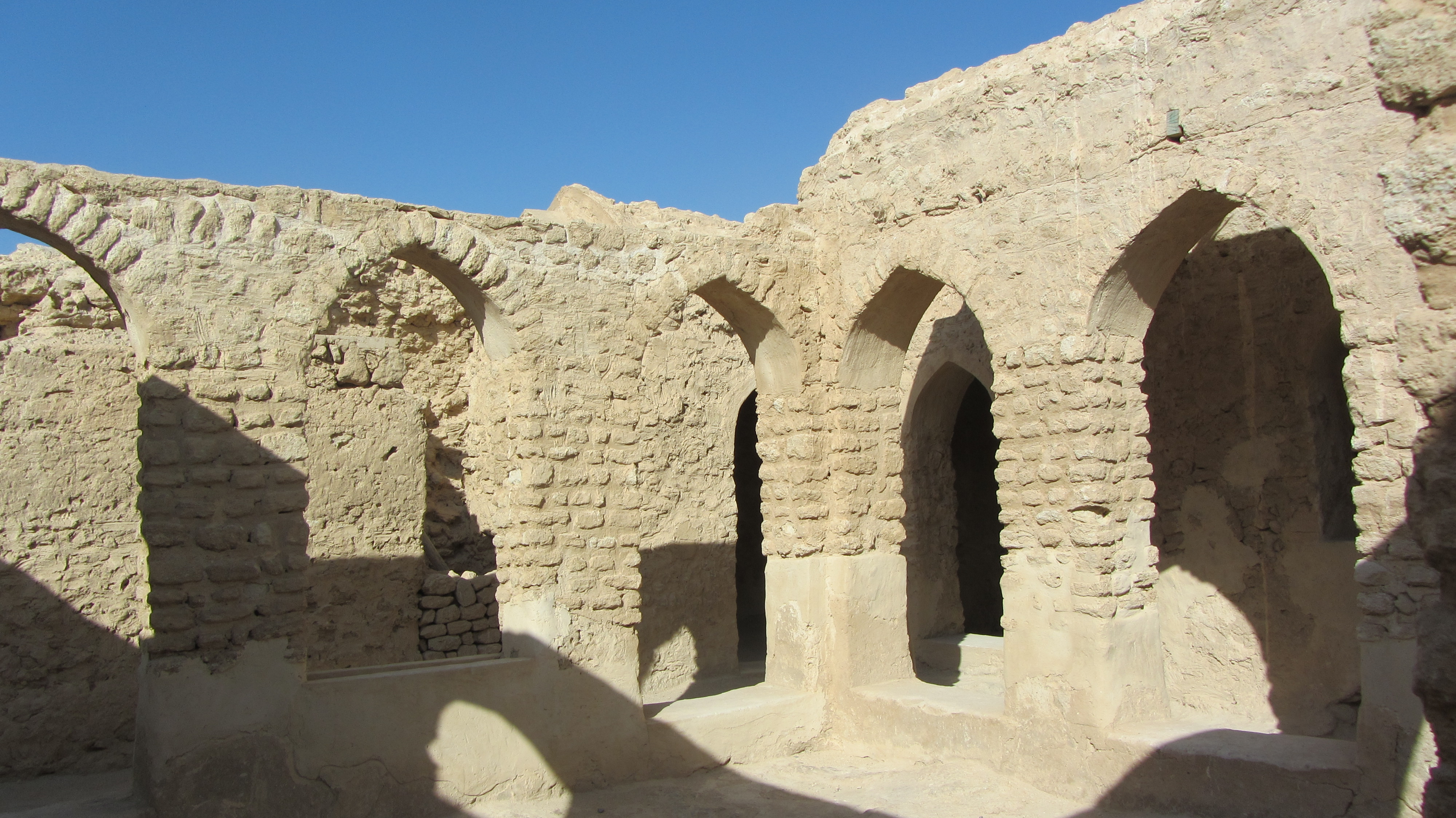

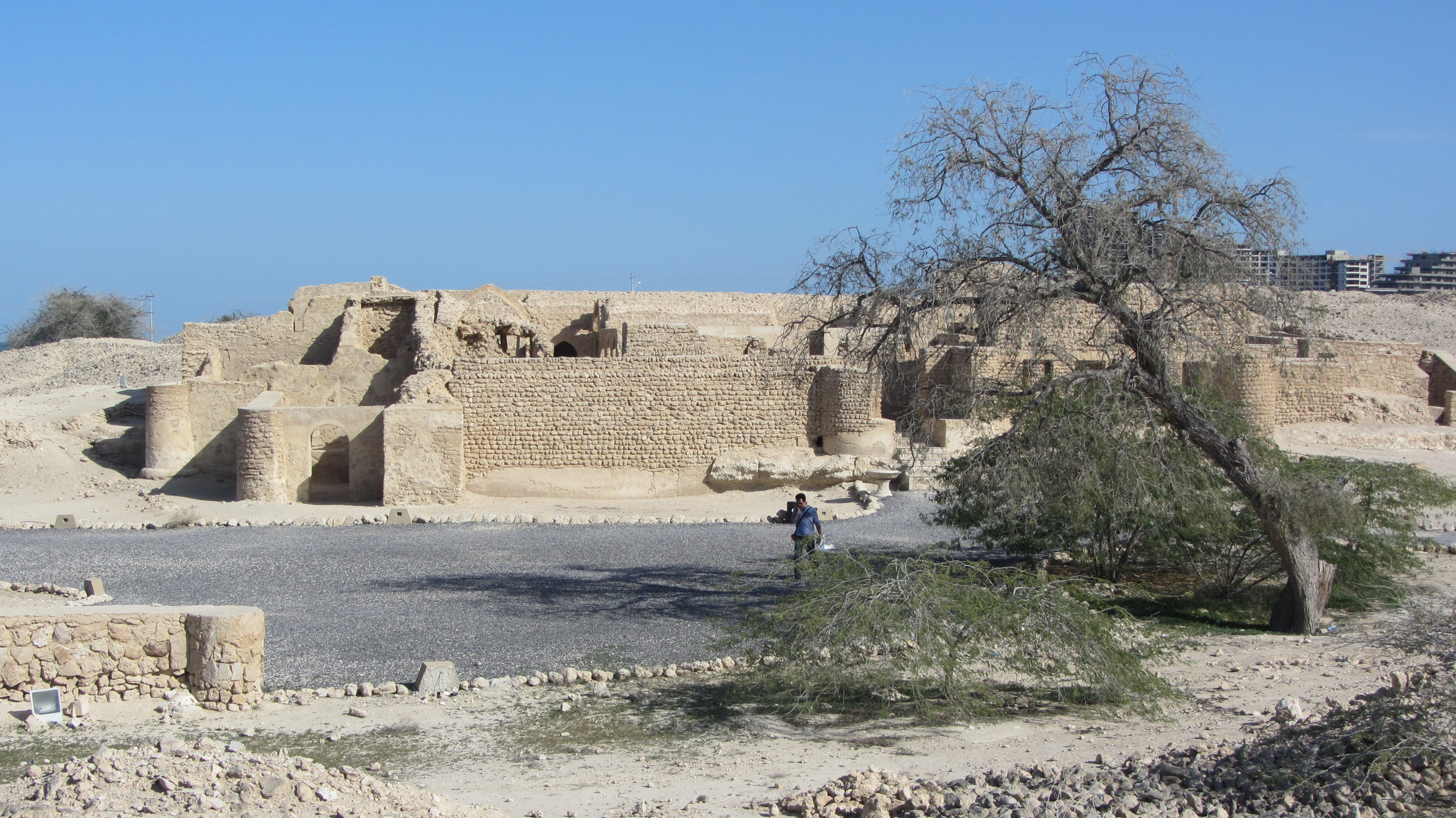

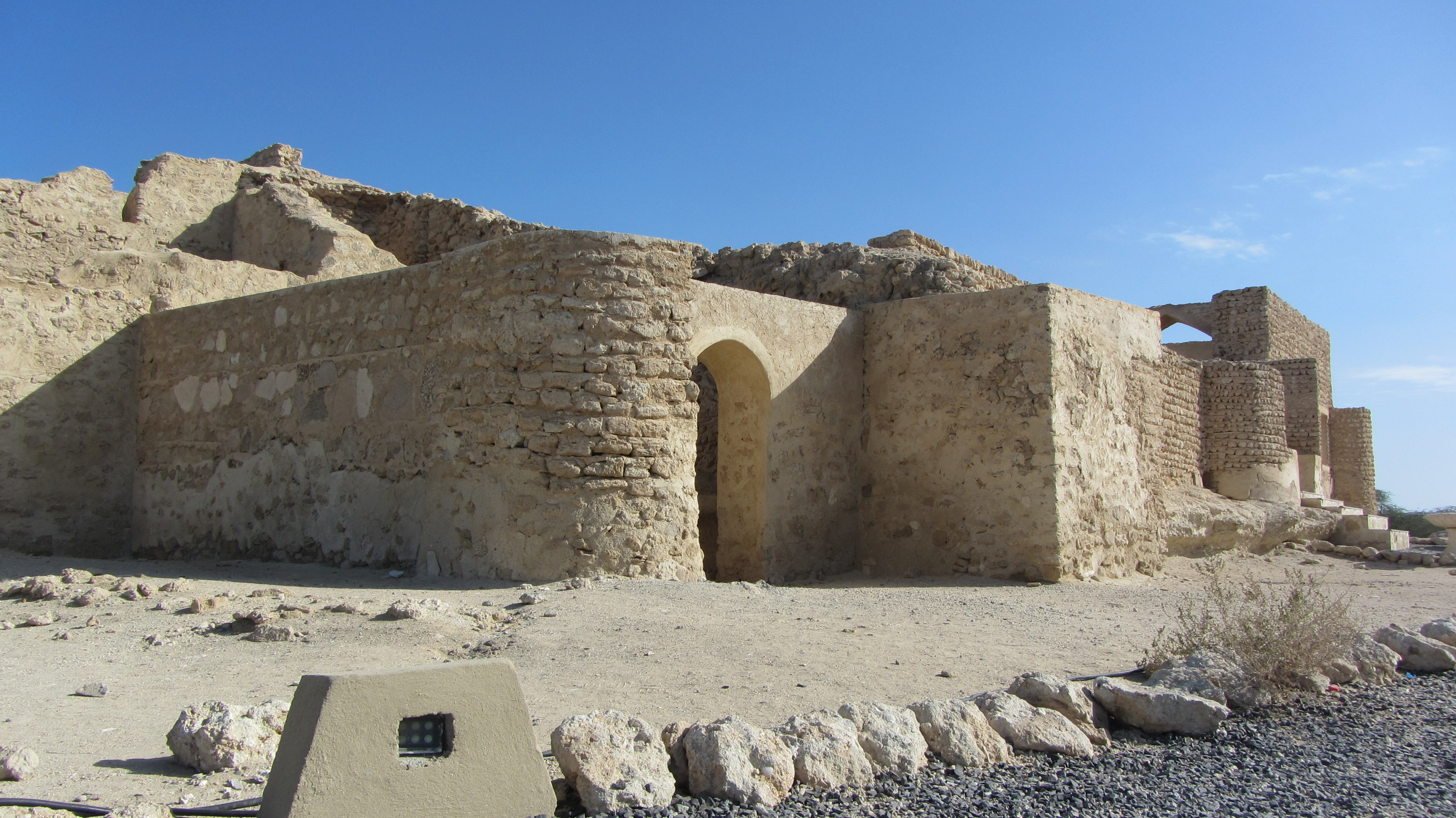

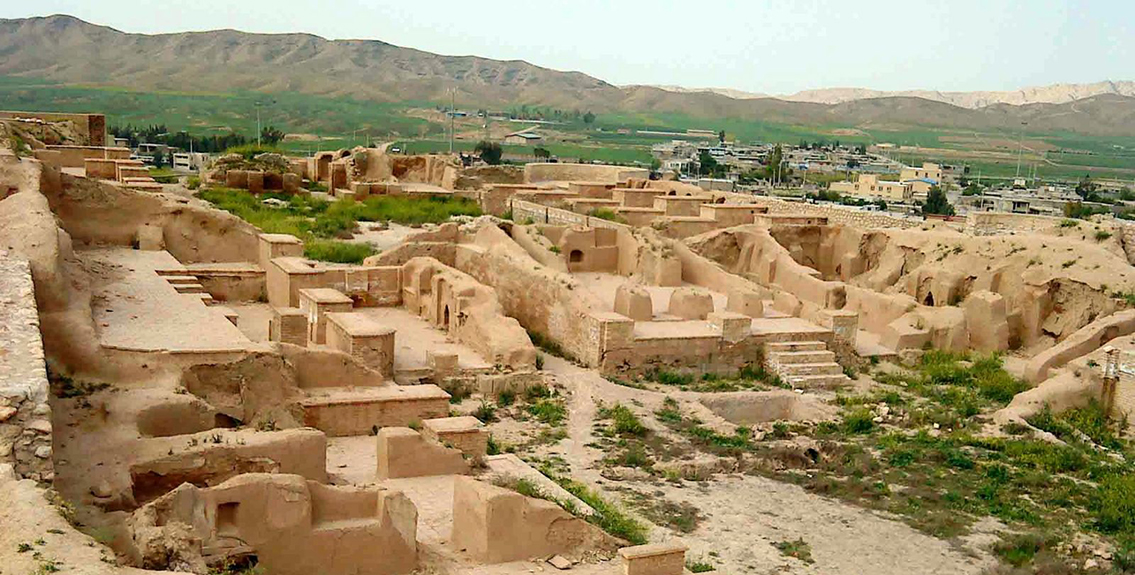

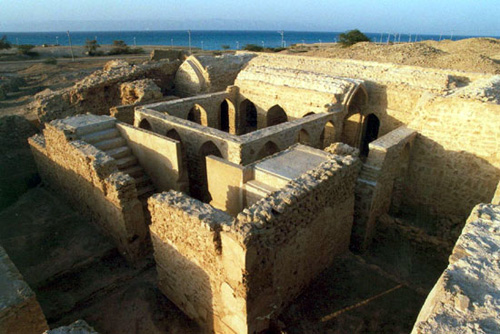

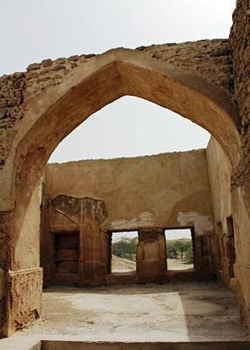

== See also ==
- Kookherd
- Bastak
- Bandar Lengeh
- Hormozgān
