= Azadegan Water Park =

Water park in Tehran, Iran

- Interactive map of Azadegan Water Park
- Type: Water park
- Location: Southeastern Tehran, Iran
- Coordinates: 35°37′53″N 51°28′22″E

Azadegan is a water park located in southeastern Tehran, Iran. It contains an artificial lake and wave machine.
