= Tikuji-Ni-Wadi =

Amusement park in Maharashtra, India

- Interactive map of Tikuji-Ni-Wadi
- Location: Thane, Mumbai
- Coordinates: 19.2370°N 72.9695°E
- Status: Operating
- Opened: 1983
- Slogan: Altogether More Fun
- Operating season: All
- Website: www.tikuji-ni-wadi.com

Tikuji-Ni-Wadi is an amusement park, water park, and a resort near Mumbai and at Thane. The amusement park includes go-karts, roller coasters, giant wheels and water park. Additionally, there is a Shiva temple and marriage halls as a part of the resort. During Shivaratri, a Shiva ice replica is made. The park remains open during the rainy season. In 2013, a realistic-looking dinosaur park was started. The park, spread over 20 acres (8.1 ha) of land, is popular for greenery and a "UFO ride". There are several other activities and attractions such as go-karting, bumper-boats, dinosaur world, 9D adventure, aquarium and farm.

== In popular culture ==
Tikuji-Ni-Wadi was featured in an episode on Taarak Mehta Ka Ooltah Chashmah where the entire Gokuldham society members go to Tikuji-Ni-Wadi for a picnic.
