= Maros Water Park =

Water park

Maros Water Park is one of water park existing in Maros district, South Sulawesi and was built and ready to soft launch in October 2009. It is planned to be opened in January 2013. It contains outbound area, cottages, restaurant, mini water park, semi olympic pool and body slide. It is surrounded with natural hills, fresh water on site, and with a couple of caves.
