= Ocean Water Park =

Water park in Kish Island, Iran

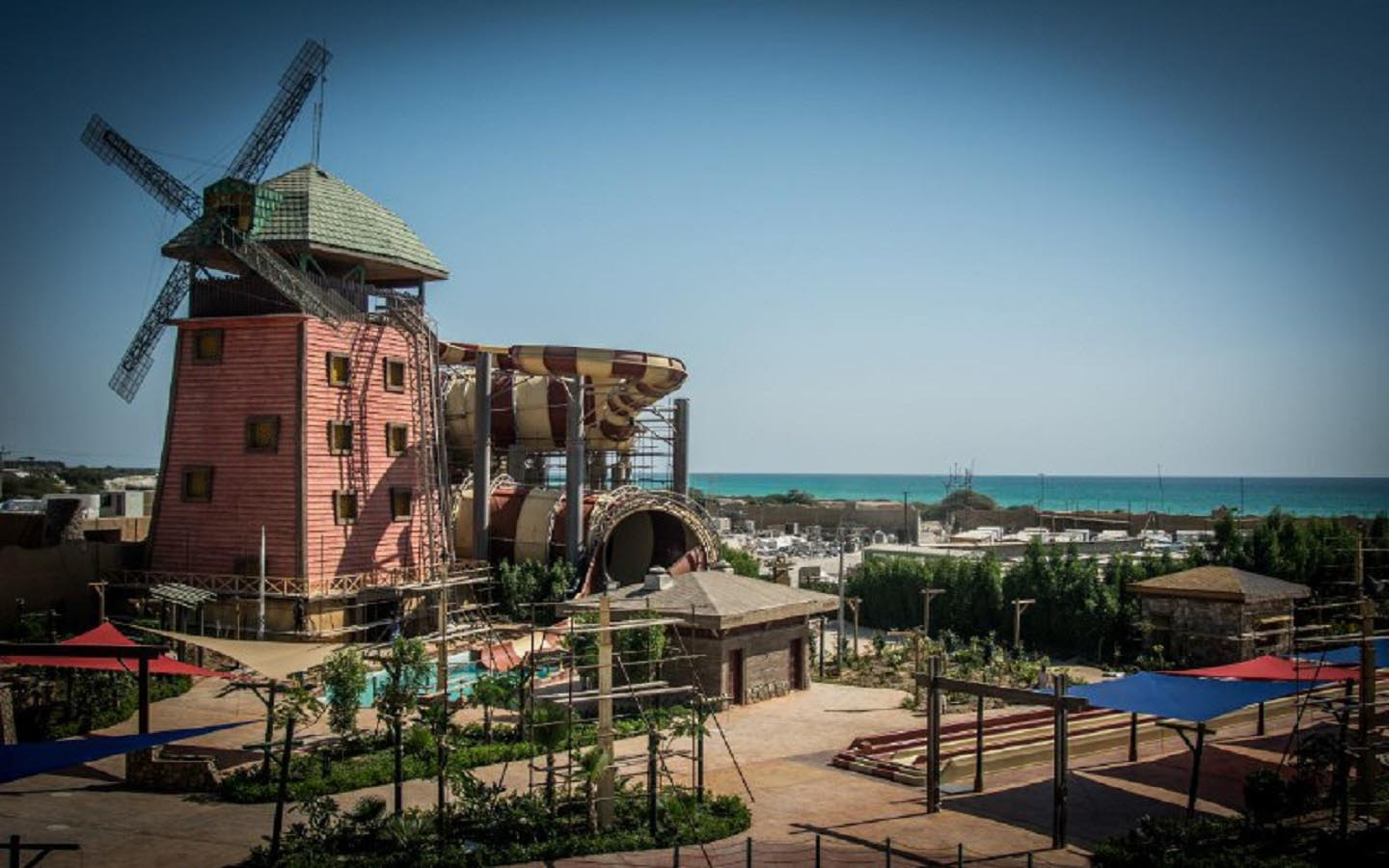
- Anaconda Ride at Ocean Water Park
- Slogan: Adventure Island
- Location: Kish Island, Iran
- Coordinates: 26.49731337°N 53.98038827°E
- Theme: Mystery of the Sun Castle
- Owner: EzamInvest
- Opened: 10 January 2017
- Operating season: Year-round
- Status: Operating
- Area: 5.6 hectares
- Pools: 4 pools
- Water slides: 13 water slides
- Children's areas: 3 children's areas
- Website: oceanwaterpark.com

Ocean Water Park is a 5.6-hectare (14-acre) outdoor water park on Kish Island, Iran. It is the first Iranian outdoor-themed water park based on the story of the Mystery of the Sun Castle. It opened in January 2017. The park's theme has been implemented under the supervision of Ahmad Jafari, veteran architect and Disney NFFC.

The park has several localized features, as well as unique rides in the region. The park offers women-only days to accommodate its Muslim patrons. Ocean Water Park also has one of the tallest rides in the region, Pichaloop, with a 24-meter drop.

== Park Story ==
Ocean Water Park's story is based on a group of pirates attacking an island in the Persian Gulf. The pirates, headed by Captain Sayan, raid and capture the Sun Castle in order to obtain the Sun Orb and rule the ocean. Three brothers, named Pullad, Mahan, and Bashoo, the residents of the Sun Castle, decide to fight against the pirates and reclaim the Sun Castle.

== Other Areas and Services ==
There are various themed restaurants and beverage stops at Ocean Water Park, in addition to shopping areas and a massage center. These areas offer fast foods, drinks, souvenirs, swimming gear and accessories. Locker rooms and bathrooms are provided. One of the features of the water park is that it offers exclusive women-only days, suitable for Muslim tourists of the Middle East region.

- Plumeria Spa: A massage center, designed for massage and relaxation services.
- Wrist Bands: Guests deposit money in their magnetic guest wrist bands instead of carrying wallets or purses throughout the park for buying food and beverages. Unused funds on the wrist band are refunded to the guest.
- Food and Beverages: There are two themed restaurants and four themed beverage shops in Ocean Water Park. ZamboZimbo offers hot and cold sandwiches. Chico is the main restaurant in Ocean Water park and offers salads, appetizers, pizzas, fried chicken, etc. For beverages, guests can also stop by Fruitila, Noushak, Coffeesa, and Jetsemina Cave.

== See also ==
- List of Water Parks
- Kish Island, Iran
