= WaterWorld (water parks) =

Chain of water parks in the Philippines

- Industry: Water parks
- Founded: Iloilo City, Philippines (December 16, 2016; 9 years ago)
- Number of locations: 2
- Area served: Philippines
- Owner: Eon Group of Companies
- Website: WaterWorld Iloilo; WaterWorld Cebu

WaterWorld is a chain of water parks owned and operated by Eon Group of Companies, with locations in Jaro, Iloilo City, and Mandaue, Cebu, in the Visayas region of the Philippines.

== History ==
Felix Tiu, the founder and CEO of Eon Group of Companies announced the development of WaterWorld Iloilo in 2015, intending to replace the convention center previously located at the 2-hectare Centennial Resort Hotel and Convention Center in Alta Tierra Village in Jaro, Iloilo City. WaterWorld Iloilo officially opened on December 16, 2016, becoming the Philippines' first solar-powered water park and the largest water park in Western Visayas. The water park features over 20 rides and water slides, including an indoor water playhouse known as FuntaSea, which offers additional rides and slides and is equipped with a roof covered in solar panels that power the entire facility. WaterWorld Iloilo also includes a 222-meter-long lazy river, a multi-lane mat racer water slide, two pools, eight luxury cabanas, three restaurants, and a souvenir and novelty shop.

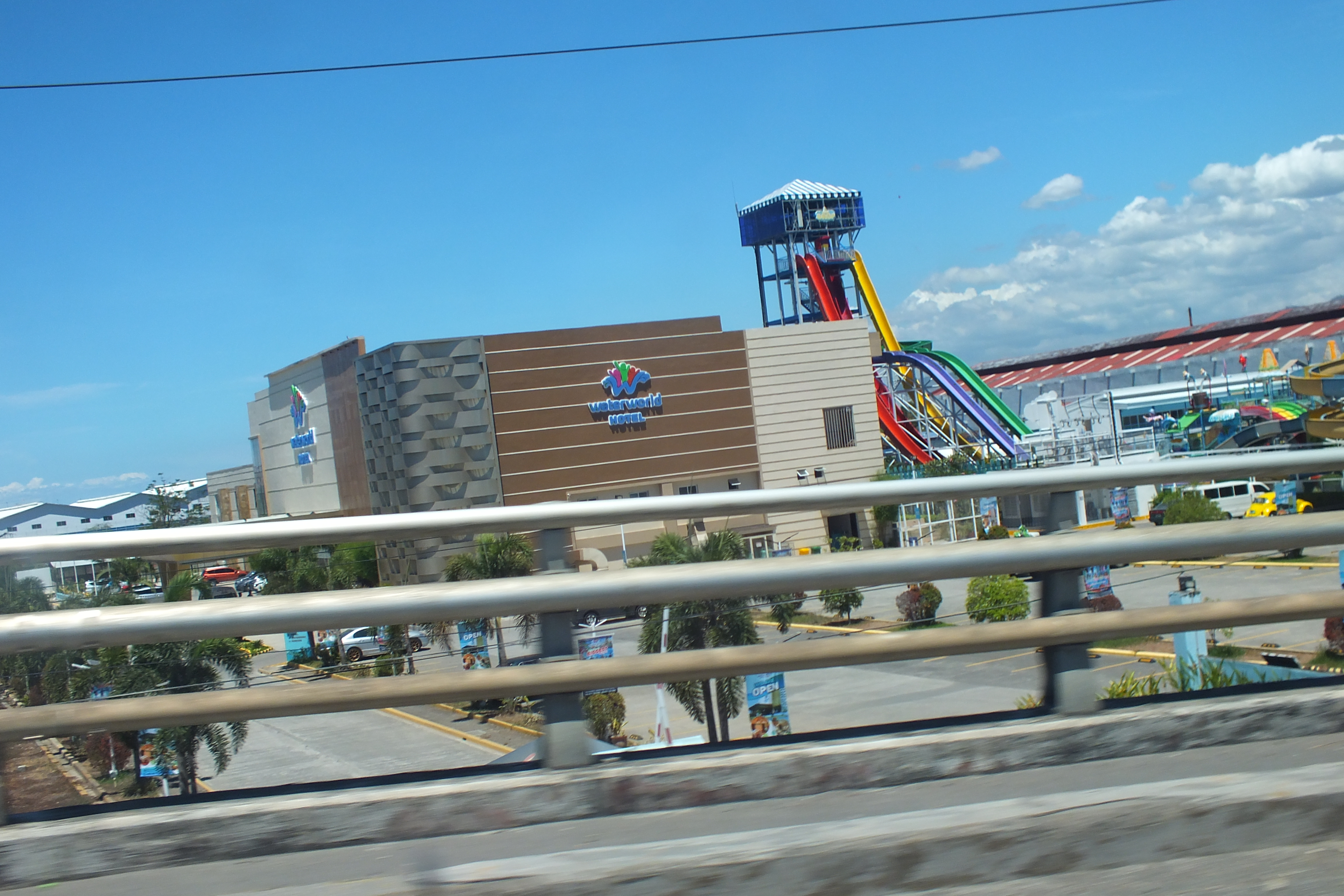
WaterWorld Hotel in Mandaue

Following the success of WaterWorld Iloilo, Eon Group of Companies announced plans to expand the WaterWorld franchise to Mandaue, Cebu. The new project, known as WaterWorld Cebu, is valued at over 350 million pesos, making it one of the most expensive water parks in the Philippines. Spanning three hectares on Marcelo Fernan Bridge, WaterWorld Cebu is designed to be one of the largest water parks in the country, featuring a major entertainment complex that includes an amusement park and resort. WaterWorld Cebu officially opened on December 14, 2019.
