= Jpark Island Resort & Waterpark =

Water park in Lapu-Lapu City, Philippines

- Interactive map of Jpark Island Resort & Waterpark
- Location: Lapu-Lapu City Cebu, Philippines
- Coordinates: 10°16′55.2″N 123°59′47.2″E
- Owner: BXT Corporation
- Opened: 2009
- Previous names: Imperial Palace Waterpark Resort and Spa
- Status: Operating
- Area: 16.5 hectares (41 acres)
- Pools: 5 pools
- Water slides: 3 water slides
- Website: www.jparkislandresort.com

The Jpark Island Resort & Waterpark Mactan is a water park and resort in Lapu-Lapu City Cebu, Philippines.

== History ==
The Jpark Island Resort & Waterpark Mactan was established by businessman Park Yong Jun. Park would offer his friend Justin Uy, a fellow businessman who he often plays golf with to buy shares of his company but the latter was still focused on his manufacturing business at that time. The water park, which was initially known as the Imperial Palace Waterpark Resort and Spa, had its groundbreaking ceremony in 2005. It had its soft opening in early 2009, and its grand opening on September 16, 2009. The Imperial Palace started out as a 8 hectares (20 acres) property.

Justin Uy would join Park at Philippine BXT Corporation after one of the company's owners South Korean firm Taihan Electronics sold its shares in 2011. By June 2014, the water park had a rebranding and adopted its current name. The "J" in its name is a reference to the name of the Uy siblings whose names all start with the letter, while Park signifies for Park Yong Jun who remains to be a family friend of the Uys. In 2015, the BXT Corporation became wholly Filipino-owned by the Uy family. By 2022, Jpark has expanded to a 16.5 hectares (41 acres) water park. A Pororo Park, an indoor theme park was launched within the Jpark Island Resort within the same year.

== Facilities ==
The Jpark Island Resort & Waterpark covers an area of 16.5 hectares (41 acres). It also have 568 rooms, villas and suites, six themed pools, 10 dining outlets, a casino, an activity zone, a dive shop, and a private beach.

== Panglao branch ==
There is a branch in Panglao, Bohol of Jpark Island Resort called Alona Beach Resort.
