= Fontana Leisure Parks =

Entertainment complex in Mabalacat, Philippines

- Logo

- Clubhouse
- Interactive map of Fontana Leisure Parks
- Location: Clark Freeport Zone, Mabalacat, Pampanga, Philippines; 15°11′39.3″N 120°30′34.5″E
- Owner: Fontana Development Corporation
- Operating license holder: Jimei Group (former)
- Website: fontanaclark.com

Fontana Leisure Parks, formerly known as the Fontana Hot Spring Leisure Parks & Casino, is a water park and casino situated at the Clark Freeport Zone in Mabalacat, Pampanga, Philippines.

== History ==
Engineering firm R.S. Caparros and Associates and developer R.N. Development Corporation was involved in the construction of Fontana Leisure Parks. The park situated within the Clark Special Economic Zone.

The first phase of the Fontana project was completed in December 2007.

The leisure complex hosted the first meetings of the year-long 2016 APEC Summit from January to February 2016.

By early December 2016, Fontana Casino was shut down due to lack of permit from PAGCOR, following the detaining of 1,316 Chinese nationals suspected to be working illegally at the site on November 24, 2015. Jack Lam, the chairman of the operating firm, Jimei Group reportedly fled to Hong Kong four days later.

On December 8, 2016 President Rodrigo Duterte, lifted the arrest order he imposed on Lam after the latter expressed that he would settle his obligations to PAGCOR. Duterte said that "he takes pity of 6,000 plus Filipinos" who had jobs. Among the obligations reported is that Lam's firm is to pay 10% gaming revenue to PAGCOR. Previously Lam paid to the government-owned gaming firm only 1% gaming revenue under an "original contract".

The resort ceased operations when the enhanced community quarantine in Luzon imposed due to the COVID-19 pandemic was imposed in March 2020.

The whole complex was closed in May 2020 and placed under lockdown amidst the COVID-19 pandemic. The closure came after authorities raided a makeshift COVID-19 hospital for Chinese nationals operating inside the site without the appropriate permits. The management of Fontana denied its involvement pointing out that the ownership of the villa where the makeshift facility was transferred to the Shidaikeji Technology Corporation and condemned the conduct of illegal activity inside its property.

Fontana was closed again Monday, January 6, 2025, by the Clark Development Corporation (CDC) due to financial and contractual obligations that have remained unresolved to the government. This was the third time Fontana has received such orders. The closure affected over 500 employees, which included 346 from the resort and 229 from the casino.

== Facilities ==
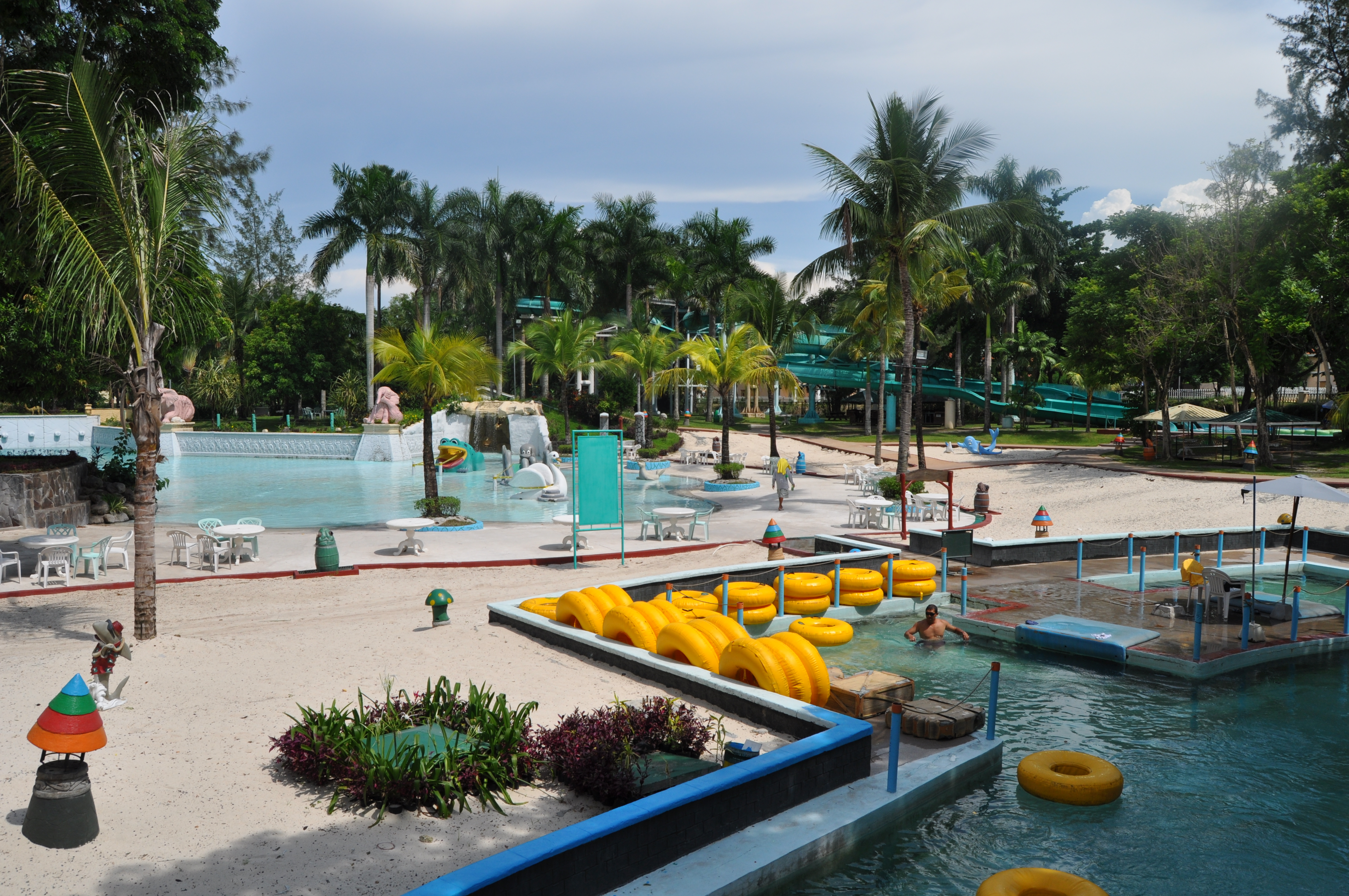
Water park

=== Gambling ===
The casino hosts at least a hundred slot and video machines. 49 gaming tables which offers games such as Baccarat, Blackjack, Roulette. 4 VIP rooms and 1 "Premium Player's Pit" is housed within the Pai-Gow Fontana Casino.

=== Other facilities ===
Aside from casino facilities, Fontana Leisure Parks hosts a hotel, a hot spring, swimming pool and a water park.

Fontana Leisure Parks hosts an events venue called the Fontana Leisure Parks Convention Center. The convention center has hosted concerts by international artists such as Michael Johnson and Stephen Bishop, as well as business conventions such as the MICE CON and the 2015 APEC Summit. It contains 9 function rooms.

The Sports Center area of Fontana Leisure Parks consists of basketball, volleyball, and badminton courts, as well as an indoor venue. The leisure park also hosts a 9-hole par golf course 28 within its grounds. Graham Marsh was responsible for the design of the golf venue.
