= Kish Institute of Science and Technology =

Kish Institute of Science and Technology is an educational institute in Iran. It is an affiliate of Kish Free Zone Organization. It is responsible for the organization's training courses. The Institute offers courses for children, adolescents and adults.

== History ==
The Institute was established in 1988. Its first goal was to offer training courses regarding the science and technology of maritime fishing. In 1990 the Institute added English English language courses. Later, other language courses including French, Spanish and German were added.

== Current status ==
Today, Kish Institute has 72 educational centers in 17 states.
