= Blue Tree Phuket =

Coordinates: 7°59′25″N 98°19′08″E

- Location: Phuket, Thailand
- Opened: August 2019
- Website: bluetreephuket.co

Blue Tree Phuket is a community center in Phuket, Thailand.

== History ==
They hosted a water park and recreational section, Blue Tree Lagoon, which was opened in 2019, but later, it was permanently closed in 2024 due to the lack of customer demand, stating they are under construction of other areas in the village on the property.

== Incidents ==
A young boy from the United Kingdom, who was visiting, drowned when he stumbled into the landing area of the main water slide in the Lagoon, and park officials and local authorities failed to save him.
