= Abu Musa (disambiguation) =

Abu Musa is a disputed island in the Persian Gulf near the Strait of Hormuz.

Abu Musa may also refer to:

== Places ==
- Abumusa (City), The capital city of Abumusa County, Hormozgan Province, Iran
- Abumusa County, a county in Hormozgan Province in Iran
- Abu Musa Airport, Iran

== People ==
- Abu Musa, Abu Musa Ashaari, an important figure in early Islamic history
- Abu Musa Mombasa, Pakistani member of the Somali militant paramilitary group al-Shabaab
- Said al-Muragha (1927–2013), Palestinian militant better known as Abu Musa
- Abu Mosa (press officer) (died 2014), press officer for the Islamic State
- Abu Salah Musa (born 1981), Bangladeshi kabaddi player
