= 1987 Sharjawi coup attempt =

Political crisis in the United Arab Emirates

Coordinates: 25.3575°N 55.390833°E

1987 Sharjawi coup
- Part of 1980s oil glut
- Emirate of Sharjah in the United Arab Emirates
Date	June 17, 1987 - June 24, 1987
Location	Emirate of Sharjah
Result	Coup failed Negotiated settlement by the Federal Supreme Council: Sultan bin Muhammad Al-Qasimi reinstated as Sheikh of Sharjah; Sheikh `Abd al-`Aziz bin Muhammad Al Qasimi named crown prince

Belligerents
(Emirate of Sharjah) Sharjah; Supported by: United Arab Emirates: (Emirate of Abu Dhabi) Abu Dhabi; (Emirate of Ajman) Ajman; (Emirate of Fujairah) Fujairah; (Emirate of Dubai) Dubai (officially); (Emirate of Ras Al Khaimah) Ras Al Khaimah (officially); (Emirate of Umm Al Quwain) Umm Al Quwain; Saudi Arabia	(Emirate of Sharjah) Eastern separatists: Soviet Union (denied by UAE)

Commanders and leaders
(Emirate of Sharjah) Sultan bin Muhammad Al-Qasimi (Emirate of Dubai) Mohammed bin Rashid Al Maktoum	(Emirate of Sharjah) Sheikh `Abd al-`Aziz bin Muhammad Al Qasimi

Units involved
(Emirate of Sharjah) Sharjah Amiri Guard loyalists United Arab Emirates Army	(Emirate of Sharjah) Sharjah Amiri Guard dissidents (United Arab Emirates) Emirati Mercenaries

Strength
~1,600	~800

The 1987 Sharjawi coup or the 1987 Emirati crisis was a political crisis in the United Arab Emirates (UAE) when, due to economic recession due to the 1980s oil glut, the brother of Sultan bin Muhammad Al-Qasimi, the Sheikh of the Emirate of Sharjah, Sheikh Abdulaziz bin Muhammad Al Qasimi, attempted to stage a bloodless palace coup seizing key positions throughout Sharjah with military elements loyal to him. The coup destabilized the foundation of the still young UAE, and threatened to break the union back into its constituent Emirates, however, it would ultimately fail due to Mohammed bin Rashid Al Maktoum convincing the other Emirati leaders to reinstall the deposed Sultan bin Muhammad Al-Qasimi.

== Background ==
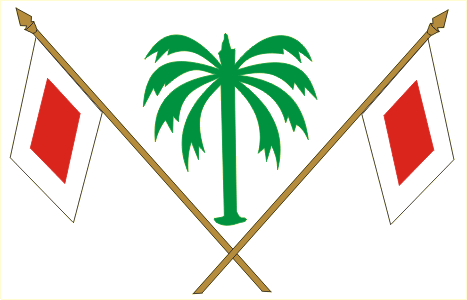
Emblem of the Sharjah branch of the Al Qasimi, which both ‘Abd al-‘Aziz and Sultan are members of

The UAE was formed on December 2, 1971, as a federation of the constituent emirates within the British protectorate of the Trucial States. Sheikh ‘Abd al-‘Aziz bin Muhammad al-Qasimi was the heir apparent for the throne of Sharjah. However, after his brother, Khalid bin Mohammed Al Qasimi, was killed during Saqr bin Sultan Al Qasimi's failed 1972 Sharjawi coup d'état attempt ‘Abd al-‘Aziz was passed over for his younger brother, Sultan bin Muhammad Al-Qasimi. Despite being passed over for Emir, by the time of the coup AbdalAziz was the Commander of the Sharjah Amiri Guard, the armed forces of Sharjah, and the Chairman of Sharjah's Chamber of Commerce. At the time of the coup, Emirati diplomats went on record as saying ‘Abd al-‘Aziz had been planning the coup "for years."

Sharjah is the third largest emirate in the UAE, with a population of 220,000. The entire Emirate's economy was based on the extraction and refinement of petroleum and other fossil fuels, such as natural gas. As such, when oil prices plummeted in 1986, the Emirate was left with around 1 billion USD$ in debt. Pundits at the time, such as the Middle East Research and Information Project, reported that the coup was less due to personal ambition, but rather for more rational economic management with greater input by the people. Aid to the poorer northern emirates by the Emirati government was slashed, and Sharjah had a reputation as the hardliner of the Emirates when the sale and consumption of alcohol was banned in 1985, causing international business and tourism, which the other emirates had used to bolster their own financials, refusing to invest and establish themselves in the emirate.

== Coup ==
In the early morning of June 17, 1987, while Sultan was on one of his many trips to Britain, forces loyal to ‘Abd al-‘Aziz seized and fortified the Emir's court, so when the population woke in the morning they found it surrounded by soldiers in trenches, jeep-mounted guns, helicopters patrolling the air, and snipers on the roof. ‘Abd al-‘Aziz also saw support from local Sharjawi police, who kept protesters and loyalists away from the Emir's court. The plotters positioned troops at key intersections throughout the city, and even installed artillery pieces near government buildings, but did not interfere in the day-to-day lives of Sharjah's citizens, and allowed the free transport of people and materials in and out of the Emirate with journalists noting a general calm and peaceful atmosphere in the city. However, the Sharjah International Airport was closed, and Dar Al Khaleej, the largest newspaper in Sharjah was shut down and evicted by the plotters, with the reporters fleeing to Dubai.

Early in the morning, ‘Abd al-‘Aziz told the Emirates News Agency that his brother had resigned as Sheikh at the request of his family after admitting to gross financial mismanagement. Sultan's wife who was in Dubai at the time quickly denied this to Emirati officials, with Sultan being rushed to Dubai shortly after to condemn the coup. ‘Abd al-‘Aziz announced that the corrupt advisers squandered state money on expensive vacations to Europe and America for their families, and even used state money for gambling and that under his leadership he would fight for the widows, workers, and debtors. Despite his pro-working class message, ‘Abd al-‘Aziz's platform did not resonate with the largely conservative population of Sharjah, and he saw little popular support. However, he did get support from the Emirate's business elite, who supported his secular pro-tourist economic outlook. Over the course of the coup it also became clear that ‘Abd al-‘Aziz had failed to win over the whole of the Sharjah Amiri Guard, the standing army of Sharjah which consisted of ~2,400 members. Of which one third, or 800, joined ‘Abd al-‘Aziz, while another 800 where pro-Sultan and the remaining 800 where loyal to the Emirati federal government. However, it seemed that the leaders of the Emirates would be willing to recognize and accept him as the new leader of Sharjah, with Zayed bin Sultan Al Nahyan, Sheikh of Abu Dhabi, and then President of the UAE, seemingly supporting the coup as a way to reduce Dubai's political influence and Abu Dhabi's debt, however, backed off after it became clear that ‘Abd al-‘Aziz was isolated both internationally and domestically. Reuters described the coup as a generation defining political event for residents of Sharjah, but that it was largely a power struggle between Abu Dhabi and Dubai. Additionally, Saqr bin Mohammed Al Qasimi, ruler of Ras Al Khaimah, also supported the coup attempt in an effort to merge both branches of the Al Qasimi into a single emirate.

By midnight going into June 18, it was clear that the UAE's leadership was unanimously opposed to ‘Abd al-‘Aziz, and were going to take steps to reinstate his brother. ‘Abd al-‘Aziz changed his message, instead calling for joint rule with his brother, and calling for a directly elected democratic parliament to be established in Sharjah as well as personal control over Sharjah's oil and financial departments. By this time Western media started to take notice of the unfolding situation, with The Washington Post suggesting on June 20, that the coup could lead to an inter-Emirate war between Dubai and Abu Dhabi, which the UAE "blandly" denied. Additionally, ‘Abd al-‘Aziz's pro-worker message, coupled with his soldiers using Soviet surplus equipment, led many to fear the coup was orchestrated by the Soviet Union.

Mohammed bin Rashid Al Maktoum, then the UAE's Minister of Defense, is credited with most of progress during the negotiation, and with making Zayed abandon ‘Abd al-‘Aziz, as well as drafting the proposed settlement and acting as principle negotiator at the Emir's court. Additionally, the UAE was pressured by Saudi Arabia to resolve the dispute diplomatically before the Organization of Petroleum Exporting Countries general assembly in Vienna that year. On June 21, the Federal Supreme Council sanctioned a deal with ‘Abd al-‘Aziz where he and his forces would surrender his arms, and walk out of the palace, in return ‘Abd al-‘Aziz would renounce his claims on Sharjah and he would be named crown prince, or deputy emir, a title which would be inherited by his son, and all participants in the coup where given a blanket amnesty. ‘Abd al-‘Aziz accepted the deal on June 24, and walked out of the emir's court with his son and military leaders.

== Aftermath ==
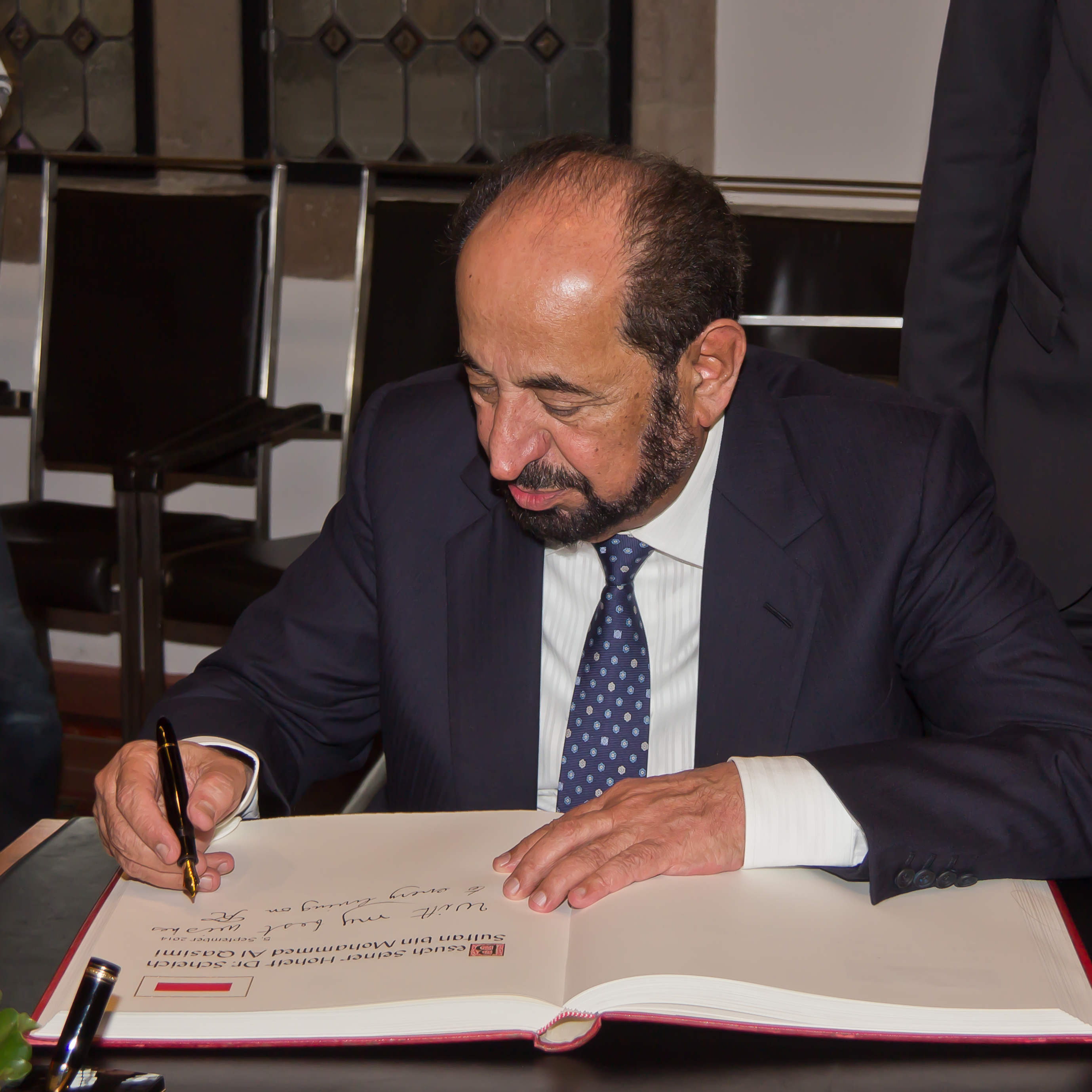
Sultan bin Muhammad Al-Qasimi at a state visit to Cologne in 2014

The first coup in the Persian Gulf region since the 1973 oil crisis, foreign pundits speculated that the coup could spell the end for the UAE as a whole, with the 16 year-old federation nearly coming apart due to inter-Emirate rivalries. Pundits speculated this coup would at least result in a reduction in oil output throughout the Persian Gulf. Sultan was deeply disturbed by the precedent sent by the Federal Supreme Council's amnesty deal, stating that it would cause a “Central American situation in the Gulf” opening the region up to frequent coups and foreign intervention. A committee of the Emirs of Ras Al Khaimah, Ajman and Fujairah led by Hamdan bin Rashid Al Maktoum investigated the cause of the coup, and provided steps to ensure that any subsequent efforts would be unsuccessful. After the failed coup Sultan purged his own guard and instead hired the Dubai emiri guards for his personal protection. Sultan also spent several months after the coup living in Dubai claiming it was for his, and his family's safety.

The power struggle between the two brothers would continue in an uneasy truce. This would come to an end when `Abd al-`Aziz bin Muhammad Al Qasimi died of natural causes on January 23, 2005. Before then the dispute largely ended with the death of Sultan's son and heir in 1999 with a compromise candidate from a distant branch of the family being named heir apparent. This situation would be cemented with the 2019 death of Sultan's only other son, and the 2021 naming of Sultan bin Ahmed Al Qasimi as crown prince, or deputy leader. The coup would largely be forgotten in the wake of the Gulf War just three years later.
