= Sirri, Iran =

Village in Hormozgan province, Iran

Sirri Persian: سیری
- Village
- Location within Iran
- Coordinates: 25°55′24″N 54°31′58″E
- Country: Iran
- Province: Hormozgan
- County: Abumusa
- District: Central
- Rural District: Sirri

Population (2016)
  - Total: 2,041
- Time zone: UTC+3:30 (IRST)

Sirri (Persian: سیری) is a village in, and the capital of, Sirri Rural District of the Central District of Abumusa County, Hormozgan province, Iran.

== History ==
Sirri Rural District was created in the Central District after the 2006 National Census.

== Demographics ==
=== Population ===
At the time of the 2011 census, the village's population was 1,304 in 36 households. The 2016 census measured the population of the village as 2,041 people in 27 households. It was the only village in its rural district.
