= 1972 Sharjawi coup d'état attempt =

Political crisis in the United Arab Emirates

Coordinates: 25.3575°N 55.390833°E

1972 Sharjawi coup
- Part of Decolonization
- Emirate of Sharjah in the United Arab Emirates
Date	January 24, 1972 - January 25, 1972
Location	Emirate of Sharjah
Result	Coup failed: Sheikh Khalid Al Qasimi killed; Saqr Al Qasimi ousted by UAE and returned to exile in Egypt; Sultan Al Qasimi named Sheikh

Belligerents
United Arab Emirates: (Emirate of Sharjah) Sharjah; Supported by: United Kingdom	(Emirate of Sharjah) Sharjawi dissidents

Commanders and leaders
(Emirate of Sharjah) Khalid bin Muhammad Al Qasimi † (United Arab Emirates) Mohammed bin Rashid Al Maktoum	(Emirate of Sharjah) Saqr bin Sultan Al Qasimi

Units involved
(Emirate of Sharjah) Khalid loyalists (United Arab Emirates) Union Defence Force	(Emirate of Sharjah) Saqr loyalists (Egypt) Egyptian Mercenaries

Strength
~2,400 UDF	25

Casualties and losses
Khalid bin Muhammad Al Qasimi his son Ahmad; 1 bodyguard 1 British officer (wounded); Several scouts wounded	

In 1972, shortly after the formation of the United Arab Emirates, the former sheikh of Sharjah, Saqr Al Qasimi, attempted to regain control over the emirate from his cousin Khalid bin Muhammad Al Qasimi. Although Saqr was able to secure the emirate's palace, and kill Khalid, an intervention by the UAE's Union Defence Force besieged Saqr and eventually forced his surrender.

== Background ==
Saqr bin Sultan Al Qasimi was the ruler of Sharjah from 1951 to 1965, having succeeded his father, Sultan bin Saqr Al Qasimi II. He was deposed shortly after opening an office of the Arab League in Sharjah, and welcoming one of their delegations. The British viewed Saqr and his support for Arab nationalism as a threat to their interests in the Trucial States leading to British officials, supported by the Al Qasimi family and led by Sir Terence Clark, to coordinate a coup in 1965 to crown Saqr's cousin Khalid bin Muhammad Al Qasimi. Saqr would go into exile in Bahrain and eventually Cairo. Sharjah would be the last Emirate to see a British presence following independence, with the British Royal Air Force base at Sharjah being the last physical presence of the British colonial government.

At the time of the coup, Khalid had become increasingly unpopular, especially among Sharjah's Arab nationalists, due to his handling, or lack thereof, of Iran's seizure of Abu Musa and the Greater and Lesser Tunbs. The Greater and Lesser Tunbs had been ruled by the Qasemi since before they migrated from the Persian coast to the present-day UAE in the 1720s. Saqr's motivation to act and attempt to seize power has been attributed, at least in part, to disaffection over Sheikh Khalid's agreement to a Memorandum of Understanding, signed on November 30, 1971, allowing Iran to station troops on the island of Abu Musa.

== Coup ==
On 2 December 1971, the Trucial States declared independence and became the United Arab Emirates. Shortly after in January 1972, Saqr smuggled himself into Sharjah with a group of Egyptian mercenaries, seeking to restore his throne. Saqr would be supported by local Arab nationalists such as Sultan Al Owais, however, due to the British withdrawal some months earlier, he failed to rally the population to his anti-Colonial cause.

At approximately 2:30 PM Saqr and his forces took control of the Sheikh's palace with reports of gunfire and grenade explosions. During the fighting Khalid would be killed, either being captured and executed, or as a combatant alongside one of his bodyguards. However, within an hour of taking the palace, Saqr would be besieged by the Union Defence Force who were based out of the former RAF Sharjah who were quickly joined by a force from Dubai. Early in the morning of January 25 Saqr surrendered himself and his forces to UAE Minister of Defence and UDF commander, 22-year-old Mohammed bin Rashid Al Maktoum.

== Aftermath ==
Saqr would be tried and imprisoned until 1979, after which he returned to exile in Egypt where he spent the rest of his life. Khalid's younger brother Sultan would be named the new sheikh of Sharjah, passing over the older Abdelaziz which would lead to Abdelaziz to attempt to stage his own coup in 1987 which was also unsuccessful due to Emirati intervention.

Mohammed bin Rashid Al Maktoum wrote in his autobiography that during the coup, the leading concern among Emirati leadership was that it would spiral into a regional conflict that would "involve foreign factions, supporters and followers" mostly due to Saqr's support for the ideals of Gamal Abdel Nasser.
