= Tunb-e Bozorg =

City in Hormozgan province, Iran

Tunb-e Bozorg Persian: تنب بزرگ
- City
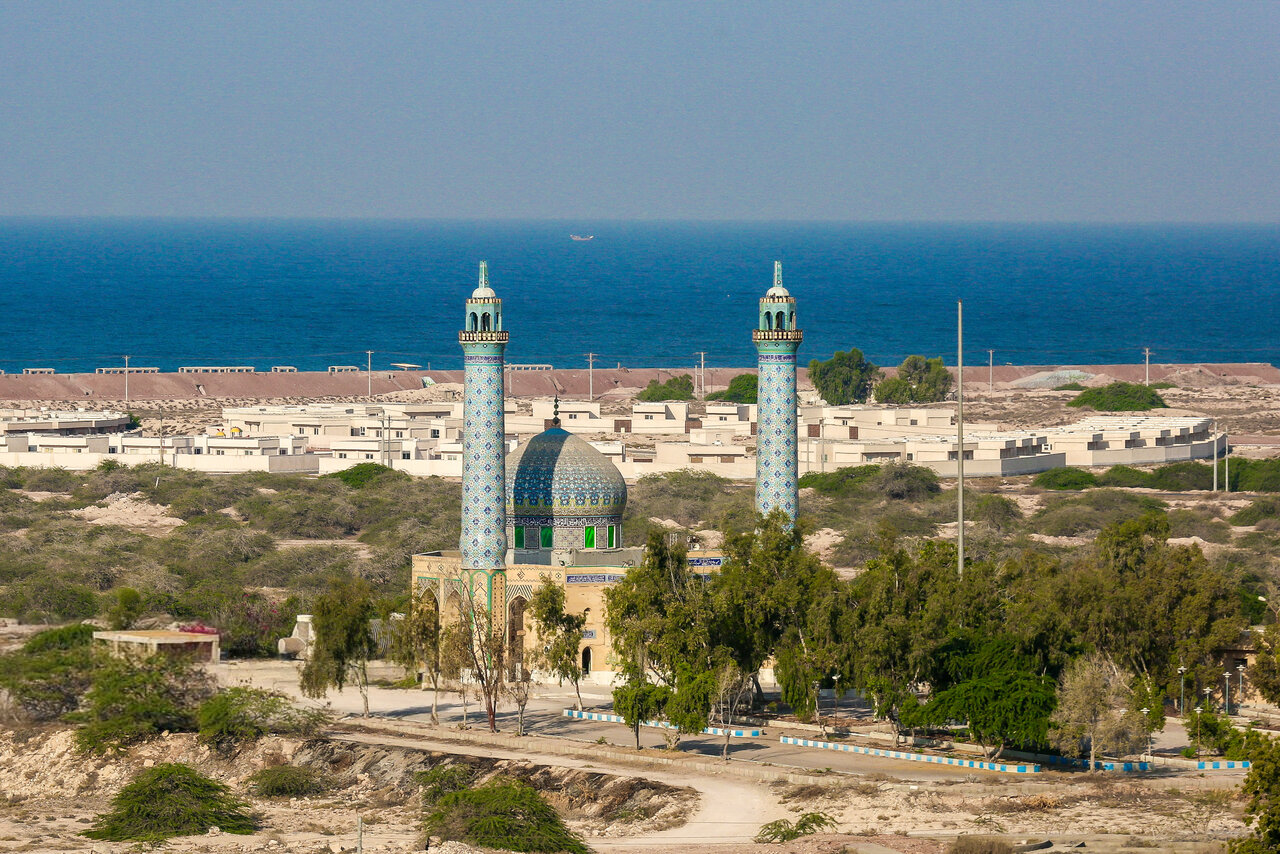

- Location within Iran
- Coordinates: 26°15′16″N 55°18′25″E
- Country: Iran
- Province: Hormozgan
- County: Abumusa
- District: Tunb

Population (2016)
  - Total: 690
- Time zone: UTC+3:30 (IRST)

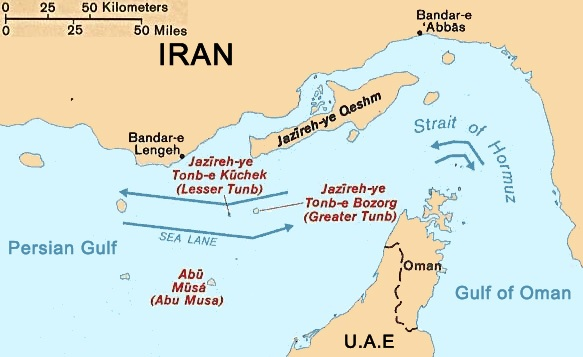
Location of the island in the Strait of Hormuz

Tunb-e Bozorg (Persian: تنب بزرگ) (Note: Also known as Greater Tumb, Jazīreh-ye Tonb-e Bozorg, Jezīrat Tunb, Tonb, Ţunb al Kubrá, and Tunb Buzurq) is a city in, and the capital of, Tunb District of Abumusa County, Hormozgan province, Iran. It also serves as the administrative center for Tunb Rural District. The city is on Greater Tunb island.

== Demographics ==
=== Population ===
At the time of the 2006 National Census, Tunb-e Bozorg's population was 155 in 49 households, when it was a village in Tunb Rural District. The following census in 2011 counted 380 people in 58 households. The 2016 census measured the population of the village as 690 people in 38 households. It was the most populous village in its rural district.

After the census, Tunb-e Bozorg was elevated to the status of a city.
