= Central District (Abumusa County) =

District in Hormozgan province, Iran

Central District (Abumusa County) Persian: بخش مرکزی شهرستان ابوموسی
- District
- Location within Iran
- Coordinates: 25°52′40″N 54°45′01″E
- Country: Iran
- Province: Hormozgan
- County: Abumusa
- Capital: Abu Musa

Population (2016)
  - Total: 6,254
- Time zone: UTC+3:30 (IRST)

The Central District of Abumusa County (Persian: بخش مرکزی شهرستان ابوموسی) is in Hormozgan province, Iran. Its capital is the city of Abu Musa. The islands of Abu Musa and Sirri make up the district.

== History ==
After the 2006 National Census, Sirri Rural District was created in the district.

== Demographics ==
=== Population ===
At the time of the 2006 census, the district's population was 1,705 in 456 households. The following census in 2011 counted 4,765 people in 656 households. The 2016 census measured the population of the district as 6,254 inhabitants in 884 households.

=== Administrative divisions ===
Central District (Abumusa County) Population
Administrative Divisions	2006	2011	2016
Sirri RD		1,304	2,041
Abu Musa (city)	1,705	3,461	4,213
Total	1,705	4,765	6,254
RD = Rural District
