= Vehicle registration plates of Hormozgan =

Hormozgan vehicle license plates

Hormozgan's codes are 84 and 94. In public cars, Taxis and Governal cars the letter is always the same. But in simple cars this letter (ب) depends on the city.

== 84 ==
18 is Bandarabbas county and Khamir County's code and all of the letters are for Bandarabbas.

۱۲ ۳۴۵	۸۴

== 94 ==
۱۲ ۳۴۵	۹۴

City	Letter
Minab	ب
Bandar Lengeh; Parsian	ج
Rudan	د
Abumusa	س
Jask	ص
Bastak	ط
Hajiabad	ق
Qeshm	ل
