= 1965 Sharjawi coup d'état =

Coup in the United Arab Emirates

Coordinates: 25.3575°N 55.390833°E

1965 Sharjawi coup
- Emirate of Sharjah in the United Arab Emirates
| Date | June 24, 1965 |
| Location | Emirate of Sharjah |
| Result | Coup Succeeded: Sheikh Saqr Al Qasimi deposed; Sheikh Khalid Al Qasimi installed; Saqr would attempt to retake the throne in 1972 |

Belligerents
| (Emirate of Sharjah) Sharjah | (Emirate of Sharjah) Al Qasimi council United Kingdom |

Commanders and leaders
| (Emirate of Sharjah) Saqr Al Qasimi | (Emirate of Sharjah) Khalid Al Qasimi (United Kingdom) Terence Clark (United Kingdom) Glencairn Balfour Paul |

Units involved
| (Emirate of Sharjah) Saqr loyalists | (Trucial States) Trucial Oman Scouts |

In 1965, in coordination with British officials, Khalid Al Qasimi, the cousin of the Sheikh of Sharjah, Saqr Al Qasimi, staged a bloodless palace coup usurping the throne to ensure British interests in the Persian Gulf.

== Background ==
Saqr, who had been Sheikh since 1951, developed a reputation as the most politically, socially and educationally progressive of the ruling sheikhs in the Trucial States. British officials began to worry about his continued loyalty to the Empire due to his positive opinions on Egyptian leader Gamal Abdel Nasser and his sympathies for the Pan-Arab cause. With the outbreak of the Dhofar War in neighboring Oman in 1963 the British became concerned that if Oman fell to the Marxist–Leninist Popular Front for the Liberation of the Occupied Arabian Gulf that the group would make good on their promises and attempt to foster Communist uprisings in the gulf states. The British where so afraid of the Gulf falling to a communist revolution that they sought to depose Arab leaders who refused to take their advice on good governance and military expansion. In the case of Saqr's enthusiastic welcome of an Arab League mission to the Trucial States, British officials were concerned that the mission might provide an opening for Nasser to undermine British presence in the Trucial States.

== Coup ==
With the strong support and backing of the Al Qasimi family for his removal, Saqr was invited to Dubai for a meeting, which was actually a trap organized by Terence Clark with the Trucial Oman Scouts ambushing and disarming the Sheikh's bodyguards. Saqr was escorted to the airport under armed guard consisting of the Scouts and two British officers, and was sent into exile in Egypt. The Al Qasimi family council then appointed Khalid as the new ruler.

== Legacy ==
One of three British coups in short succession in the Persian Gulf, the British had also toppled the Sheikh of Abu Dhabi in 1966 and the Sultan of Oman in 1970 in order to maintain their continued interests in the region. Saqr would attempt to take back his throne following the formation of the United Arab Emirates in December 1971, unsuccessfully attempting a coup in 1972.
