= Iran–United Arab Emirates relations =

- Iran: United Arab Emirates

Iran and the United Arab Emirates previously maintained diplomatic missions, but the United Arab Emirates closed its embassy in Tehran on March 1, 2026, following a series of Iranian missile and drone strikes on Emirati territory.

This military escalation during the 2026 Iran war effectively terminated the "cautious de-escalation" policy previously pursued by Abu Dhabi. Despite a large Iranian diaspora in the Emirate of Dubai and historical links between coastal communities in southern Iran and the UAE, the relationship has shifted into active military confrontation. Following the targeting of Al Dhafra Air Base and civilian infrastructure by the Islamic Revolutionary Guard Corps (IRGC), the UAE Ministry of Interior began a widespread crackdown on IRGC-linked espionage networks within the country. On 18 August 2026, the UAE reported that Iran launched two missiles towards its territory, with one landing in its waters. Subsequently, the UAE suspended all trade and financial transactions with Iran until further notice.

== History ==
In recent decades, there have been tensions over three islands in the Persian Gulf: Abu Musa and the Greater and Lesser Tunbs. Both the UAE and Iran have maintained that they are trying to find a solution to this issue according to the rules of international law.

Outstanding conflicts are:

- UAE challenges Iran's sovereignty over three islands in the Persian Gulf while Iran considers them as its inseparable parts: Lesser Tunb (called Tunb-al-Sughra in Arabic and Tonb-e-Kuchak in Persian) and Greater Tunb (called Tunb-al-Kubra in Arabic and Tonb-e-Bozorg in Persian). The islands have been in Iran's control since November 1971, following the departure of British forces from the Persian Gulf, and a few days before UAE's declaration of independence in December 1971.
- UAE has disputed Iran's sovereignty over Abu Musa, an island in the Persian Gulf that was agreed in a 1971 memorandum of understanding to be jointly administered with Iran for civil matters in the southern part of the island (called Jazirat-Abu-Musa in Arabic and Jazireh-ye-Abu-Musa in Persian). The island was under Iranian control until Britain gained control in 1908. In the late 1960s, Britain transferred administration of the island to the British-appointed Sharjah sheikhdom, one of the seven sheikdoms that would later form the UAE. On November 30, 1971 (two days before the official establishment of UAE), Iran and Sharjah signed a memorandum of understanding to jointly administer a part of the island based on a map annexed to the memorandum, allowing Iran to station military forces and the Sharjah sheikhdom to maintain a limited number of police in the island. However, Iran has taken steps to exert unilateral control since 1992, including access restrictions and a military build-up on the island, as well as expelling the foreign workers who operated the UAE-sponsored school, medical clinic, and power-generating station.
- Iran has criticized the UAE for allowing France to develop its first permanent base in the Persian Gulf and generally considers the UAE's permission for stationing the Western powers' military forces in the region as a threat to its national security.
- UAE Football League's name change has been viewed as a revival of the Persian Gulf naming dispute.
- UAE demonstrates political support for Saudi Arabia, Iran's rival. The Government of Iran claims that UAE and Saudi Arabia collaborate with each other in attempt to destabilize Iran.

On November 28, 2013, the foreign minister of the UAE visited Iran. In late July 2019, an Emirati delegation of coast guard commanders have met with their Iranian counterparts in Tehran for the first time in six years, in order to improve maritime co-operation in the Strait of Hormuz.

In the aftermath of 2016 attack on the Saudi diplomatic missions in Iran, the United Arab Emirates had criticized Iran for not protecting Saudi diplomat missionary, however, unlike Saudi Arabia, Bahrain, and Qatar which withdrew its ambassadors, the United Arab Emirates maintains its diplomatic mission in the country, just limited its diplomatic relations.

=== Iran-backed Houthis ===
In 2019, Iran-backed Houthis in Yemen fired a number of missiles at Abu Dhabi International Airport and Dubai International Airport, but the UAE denied that any missiles reached the country. In 2022, Iran-backed Houthis fired multiple missiles and drones at Abu Dhabi targeting oil tankers and an under-construction airport infrastructure in response to territorial losses to Emirati-trained Giants Brigade in Yemen. Although all of the missiles and multiple drones were intercepted, a drone hit an oil tanker and killed 3 civilians and injured 6 others.

=== Abraham accords ===
Relations suffered a huge decline following the Israel–United Arab Emirates normalization agreement in August 2020. The Iranian government and Palestinian government condemned the deal as a "dangerous" stab in the back of Palestinians and Muslims, and called it a "shameful" act of "strategic stupidity" by the UAE. Iran claimed that this would only serve to strengthen the "Axis of Resistance" in the Middle East, and that the Palestinians and people of the world would never forgive the UAE. Numerous threats from Iran were pointed against the United Arab Emirates following its effort to normalize relations with Israel. In response, the UAE's Foreign Ministry summoned Iran's chargé d'affaires on 16 August and criticized Rouhani's speech as "unacceptable and inflammatory" which could impact the security scenario of the Gulf. It also stated that protecting the Emirati embassy in Tehran was Iran's duty.

The Chief of Staff of the Iranian armed forces Mohammad Bagheri meanwhile said that their strategy towards the UAE would now shift and the UAE would be held responsible in case of an attack on Iran through the Persian Gulf. The conservative newspaper Kayhan, whose editor-in-chief is appointed by the Supreme Leader of Iran, warned that the agreement had turned the UAE into a "legitimate, easy target".

Following the Israel–Hezbollah conflict and Iran's October 2024 Iranian strikes against Israel, the UAE, along with other Arab countries, has been warned by Iran through secret diplomatic channels not to assist Israel or the US in any attack on Iran. Arab officials have indicated that Iran would retaliate against these states if their territories or airspace were used in such operations.

On November 24, 2024, an Israeli-Moldovan Rabbi by the name Zvi Kogan, a resident of the UAE was kidnapped and later murdered. Suspicion rose in Israeli media that this was done by or with an Iranian involvement, at the moment Iran has denied its involvement in this murder.

=== COVID-19 pandemic ===
During the COVID-19 pandemic, UAE sent four shipments of urgent medical assistance to Iran including protection clothes, respirators and testing kits.

=== 2025 Twelve-Day War ===
Following the Twelve-Day War in June 2025, the UAE decided to allow Iranian citizens to overstay within the country until the conflict subsides. This decision applied to both visitors and residents.

Following the 2025 United States strikes on Iranian nuclear sites, the UAE condemned the U.S. attack on Iran's nuclear facilities and called for an end to tensions in the region.

=== Involvement in the 2026 Iran war ===
In February 2026, the United Arab Emirates was directly affected by Iranian missile and drone attacks during a broader regional escalation following the 2026 Israeli–United States strikes on Iran. As part of retaliatory operations, Iran launched projectiles toward multiple Gulf states, including the UAE. Multiple powerful explosions were reported in parts of Dubai and Abu Dhabi, and visible impacts were recorded in urban areas.

International media outlets reported damage to civilian infrastructure, including Dubai International Airport and other prominent sites. Fires were reported in parts of Dubai, including near major hotel and commercial districts. Emirati authorities stated that national air defense systems intercepted a significant number of incoming missiles and drones; however, debris and impact effects resulted in confirmed casualties and structural damage. At least one civilian fatality and multiple injuries were reported within the UAE during the escalation.

The attacks led to temporary airspace closures and widespread flight disruptions across the Gulf region. The UAE government condemned the escalation and called for restraint and diplomatic de-escalation. On March 1, the UAE government withdrew its ambassador and all diplomatic staff from Iran, citing "acts of aggression against civilian sites". The events marked one of the most direct military confrontations affecting UAE territory in the context of modern Iran–UAE relations.

The strikes against UAE, and other Gulf nations, are part of a plan Khamenei designed before his death, ordering that in the case of war with the United States and Israel, Iran will cause regional chaos across the Middle East, with the purpose of pushing their Gulf neighbors to pressure for a halt to the attacks on Iran.

Following the ongoing Iranian strike on the UAE it is considering freezing billions of dollars in Iranian assets. Authorities are reportedly targeting Iranian bank accounts, companies, and trade networks in a move that could significantly disrupt Tehran’s access to foreign currency and signal a stronger UAE stance against Iran.

On 15 March 2026, the United Arab Emirates Ministry of Education revoked the licences of five Iranian-curriculum schools operating in Dubai and the Northern Emirates, affecting more than 4,000 students. The decision was reported following a period of heightened regional tensions after Iran’s drone-and-missile attacks. Iranian officials stated that following the closures, some students were transferred to schools in Iran or enrolled in other international schools in the UAE, while others continued their education through online programs. Iranian authorities criticized the decision, describing it as contrary to international obligations regarding children's right to education.

On 20 March 2026, it was reported that the UAE State Security Department had uncovered a terror network linking Hezbollah and Iran. The report said all the members were arrested for illegal activities like funding terrorism and money laundering. Later that month it was reported that dozens of people, mainly money changers, were arrested. Authorities accused them of assisting IRGC network transfer money, bypassing sanctions.

In May 2026, The Wall Street Journal reported that the United Arab Emirates had conducted dozens of airstrikes against Iran during the war in coordination with the United States and Israel. According to the report, the strikes began in the early days of the conflict and continued until the day after a ceasefire was announced. Reported targets included military and energy infrastructure in Bandar Abbas, Qeshm Island, Abu Musa, Lavan Island, and the Asaluyeh petrochemical complex. The newspaper also reported that the UAE's role in the conflict contributed to tensions with Saudi Arabia over regional policy toward Iran.

Against a backdrop of intensifying geopolitical friction among Iran, the United States, and Israel, Tehran escalated its diplomatic posture by issuing a formal and unequivocal warning to the United Arab Emirates. Official communications from Iranian authorities conveyed that, in the event of renewed military action by U.S. or Israeli forces, Iran would not only respond in kind but would do so with significantly heightened severity, explicitly targeting Emirati territory.

Addressing the 2026 Iran war, Yousef Al Otaiba, UAE ambassador to the US wrote in a March 2026 WSJ article, that the 2026 Iran war, is proof that the Iranian revolution that took place 50 years ago is still a threat to global security and economy stability. To resolve this immense military threat Iran imposes, a conclusive solution must be implemented.

On 18 August 2026, the UAE stated that Iran fired two missile towards it, adding that one landed inside its territorial waters. The UAE then halted all trade, exchange, and financial transactions with Iran until further notice.

== Trade ==
Iranian businesses have a major presence in the UAE. Around 8,000 Iranian traders and trading firms are registered in the UAE, according to the local Iranian Business Council. Iranians are estimated to account for roughly 500,000 in UAE. Trade between Dubai and Iran tripled to $12 billion from 2005 to 2009. UAE's exports to Iran are four times greater than its imports from Iran. The Iranian businesses in UAE own more than $300 billion there.

== See also ==
- Foreign relations of Iran
- Foreign relations of the United Arab Emirates
- Iranians in the United Arab Emirates
