= Tunb District =

District in Hormozgan province, Iran

Tunb District Persian: بخش تنب
- District
- Location within Iran
- Coordinates: 26°20′09″N 54°45′25″E
- Country: Iran
- Province: Hormozgan
- County: Abumusa
- Capital: Tunb-e Bozorg

Population (2016)
  - Total: 1,148
- Time zone: UTC+3:30 (IRST)

Tunb District (Persian: بخش تنب) is in Abumusa County, Hormozgan province, Iran. Its capital is the village of Tunb-e Bozorg. It includes the islands of Greater and Lesser Tunbs and the Faror Islands.

== History ==
After the 2016 National Census, the village of Tunb-e Bozorg was elevated to the status of a city.

== Demographics ==
=== Population ===
At the time of the 2006 census, the district's population was 155 in 49 households. The following census in 2011 counted 498 people in 60 households. The 2016 census measured the population of the district as 1,148 inhabitants in 40 households.

=== Administrative divisions ===
Tunb District Population
Administrative Divisions	2006	2011	2016
Tunb RD	155	498	1,148
Tunb-e Bozorg (city) (Note: Became a city after the 2016 census)			
Total	155	498	1,148
RD = Rural District
