= Seizure of Abu Musa and the Greater and Lesser Tunbs =

1971 Iranian military seizure of islands in the Strait of Hormuz

Abu Musa and Greater and Lesser Tunbs dispute
- Part of the Foundation of the United Arab Emirates
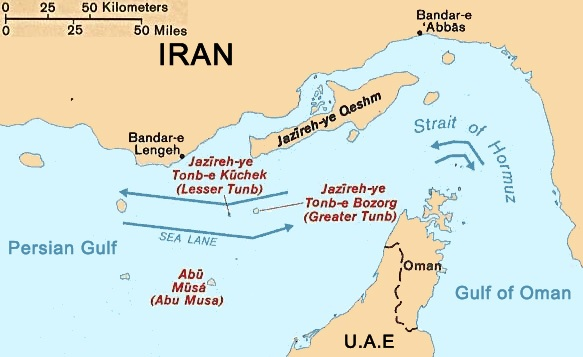
- Map of the Strait of Hormuz showing the disputed islands
Date	29–30 November 1971
Location	Persian Gulf
Result	Iranian victory
Territorial changes	Iran captures Abu Musa and the Greater and Lesser Tunbs; Sharjah and Ras Al Khaimah join the United Arab Emirates.

Belligerents
Imperial State of Iran	Trucial States; Emirate of Sharjah; Emirate of Ras Al Khaimah

Commanders and leaders
(Pahlavi Iran) Mohammad Reza Pahlavi (Pahlavi Iran) Adm. Farajollah Rasaei	(Emirate of Sharjah) Khalid bin Mohammed Al Qasimi (Emirate of Ras Al Khaimah) Saqr bin Mohammed Al Qasimi

Strength
2,000 soldiers	6 police officers

Casualties and losses
3 killed (Iranian claim)	4 killed (Iranian claim); 1 killed (UAE claim)

The seizure of Abu Musa and the Greater and Lesser Tunbs by the Imperial Iranian Navy took place on 30 November 1971, shortly after the withdrawal of British forces from the islands of Abu Musa and the Greater and Lesser Tunbs, all located in the Strait of Hormuz between the Persian Gulf and the Gulf of Oman. The Imperial State of Iran had claimed sovereignty over both sets of islands, while the Emirate of Ras al-Khaimah claimed the Greater and Lesser Tunbs and the Emirate of Sharjah claimed Abu Musa.

Following the seizure of the islands by Iran, both the emirates of Sharjah and Ras al-Khaimah acceded to the newly formed United Arab Emirates, doing so on 2 December 1971 and 10 February 1972, respectively, causing the United Arab Emirates to inherit the territorial dispute with Iran over the islands. As of 2026, the islands remain disputed between the United Arab Emirates and the Islamic Republic of Iran.

On the ground, Iran has maintained its control over the islands since their seizure in 1971, while the United Arab Emirates has made several attempts through international channels to gain sovereign control of the islands.

== Background ==
On 29 November 1971, shortly before the end of the British protectorate and the formation of the United Arab Emirates, Iran and the ruler of Sharjah signed a memorandum of understanding (MoU) for the joint administration of Abu Musa. Under the MoU, Sharjah was to have a local police station on Abu Musa and Iran was to station troops on the island according to a map attached to the MoU. Iran and Sharjah were each to have full jurisdiction in the designated areas and their flags were to continue to fly. The MoU provided for equal distribution of petroleum oil revenues. It has been said that the ruler of Sharjah had no other feasible option but to sign the MoU. He either had to negotiate to save part of his territory or forego the restoration of the remaining part of the island for good. On the same day Iran regained the Greater and Lesser Tunbs. A day later, on 30 November 1971, Iran seized Abu Musa.

== Operation ==
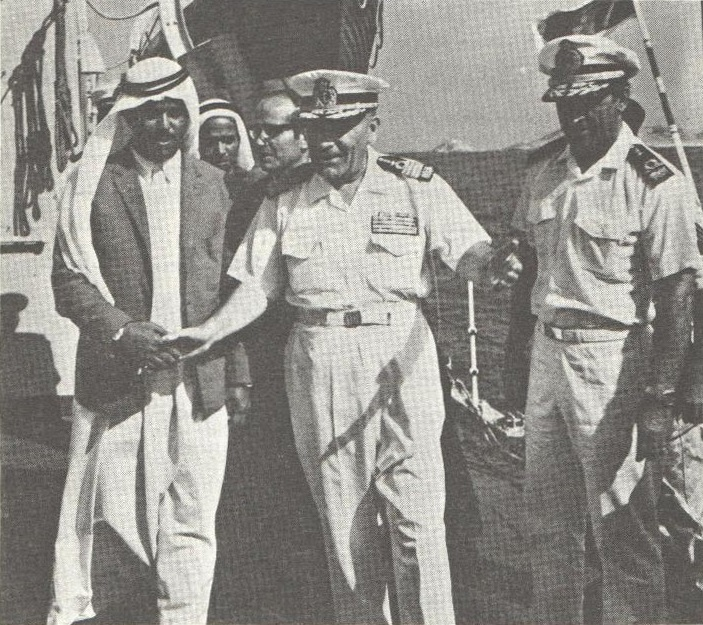
Sheikh Saqr, the brother of the ruler of Sharjah, welcoming Iranian troops aboard Iran's naval ship Artemis, at Abu Musa, 1971

At dawn on 29 November 1971, helicopters circled Abu Musa and dropped leaflets, written in Persian, telling its residents—mostly farmers and fishermen— to surrender.

At 5:30 p.m. on 29 November 1971, a contingent of the Iranian army supported by Imperial Iranian Navy forces invaded the Lesser and Greater Tunbs. In the Tunbs, the ruler of Ras Al Khaimah, Sheikh Saqr bin Mohammed Al Qasimi, who did not have a signed agreement with Iran, resisted the Iranian troops. On Greater Tunb, the Iranians ordered the six policemen stationed there to lower the flag. Salem Suhail bin Khamis, the head policeman, refused to comply and was shot and killed. Policemen in Greater Tunb clashed with the Iranian troops and in the ensuing skirmish four Ras Al Khaimah policemen and three Iranian soldiers were killed. The Iranian troops then demolished the police station, the school, and a number of houses, and forced the natives to leave the island. The body of the deceased were buried on the island and the residents were put on fishing boats and expelled to Ras Al Khaimah. The Iranian naval forces seized the islands with little resistance from the tiny Arab police force stationed there. Two British warships, the aircraft carriers HMS Eagle and the HMS Albion, stood idle during the course of the invasion. The population of the Greater Tunb in 1971 was 150. According to author Richard N. Schofield, a source states that the 120 Arab civilian population of Greater Tunb was then deported, but according to other reports the island had already been uninhabited for some time earlier.

On 30 November 1971, an Iranian contingent landed on Abu Musa to occupy the part of the island alluded to in the memorandum of understanding with Sharjah. It was led by the commandant of the navy who was received by the deputy ruler of Sharjah and some aides. On the same day, the Iranian Prime Minister officially broke the news of the seizure of the islands of Lesser and Greater Tunbs and the partial occupation of Abu Musa and stated that the Iranian flag had been hoisted on the summit of Haifa Mountain, Abu Musa's highest point. He said Iran's sovereignty of the islands was restored following prolonged talks with the British government and declared that Iran would not abandon its sovereignty over the whole of Abu Musa and, accordingly, that the presence of local officials in certain parts of the island was inconsistent with Iran's sovereignty over the whole island.

== Casualties ==
Iran announced that three of its troops were killed and one was wounded, while killing four policemen and injuring five others. The UAE has claimed one policeman to have died while defending the island.

== Aftermath ==
Iran justified the takeover, claiming that the islands were part of the Persian Empire since the 6th century BCE. The claim was disputed by the UAE which claimed that Arabs maintained control and sovereignty of the islands since the 7th century BCE. However, there is no surviving documentation from pre-colonial times regarding the sovereignty of the islands. The earliest known record regarding sovereignty is a report by the Portuguese in 1518 that the islands were inhabited and ruled by Arabs.

Prior to the takeover, the Greater and Lesser Tunbs had been administered by the emirate of Sharjah, and in 1972, partially due to discontent over the Sharjawi government largely accepting the takeover by Iran, dissident forces attempted to stage a coup d'état which saw the Emir Khalid bin Muhammad Al Qasimi killed.

In the decades following the takeover, the issue remained a source of friction between the UAE and Iran. Negotiations between the UAE and Iran in 1992 failed. The UAE attempted to bring the dispute before the International Court of Justice, but Iran refused. Iran says the islands always belonged to it as it had never renounced possession of the islands, and that they are part of Iranian territory. The UAE argues that the islands were under the control of Qasimi sheikhs throughout the 19th century, whose rights were then inherited by the UAE in 1971. Iran counters by stating that the local Qasimi rulers during a relevant part of the 19th century were actually based on the Iranian, not the Arab, coast, and had thus become Persian subjects.

In 1980, the UAE took its claim to the United Nations, but the claim was deferred by the UN Security Council at that time and it was not revisited. According to author Thomas Mattair, executive director of Middle East Policy Council (MEPC), given that Iran has consistently refused to consider mediation or arbitration from third-party groups such as the ICJ, Mattair considers the invasion a violation of Article 33 of the United Nations Charter.

== Regional and international positions ==
- Iran: Iran continues to reject all claims to the islands, describing them as an inseparable part of Iranian territory. In 2022 and 2023, Iran summoned the Chinese and Russian ambassadors after they endorsed language it viewed as favorable to the UAE position. Iran has repeatedly issued similar condemnations for diplomatic statements supporting the resolution of the dispute through bilateral negotiations or referral to the ICJ.
- United Arab Emirates: The UAE has continued to describe Abu Musa and the Greater and Lesser Tunbs as occupied Emirati islands and has repeatedly called on Iran to resolve the dispute either through direct negotiations or through the ICJ. This position was reiterated in the UAE’s statement at the 80th session in September 2025.
- Gulf Cooperation Council: In September 2023 the GCC Ministerial Council reaffirmed its rejection of Iran’s “continued occupation” of the three islands, supported UAE sovereignty over them, and declared Iranian actions there null and void.
- Arab League: In the Bahrain Declaration issued by the Arab Summit in 2024, participants reaffirmed the UAE'S sovereignty over the islands and called on Iran to respond to the UAE’s initiative for a peaceful solution, whether through direct negotiations or the ICJ.
- European Union: At the first EU–GCC summit in October 2024, the two sides called on Iran to end its "occupation" of the islands, describing it as a violation of UAE sovereignty and the principles of the UN Charter. Similar language was repeated in the October 2025 EU–GCC Joint Council statement.
- Canada: In October 2026 Canada's Prime Minister supported GCC UAE on islands.
- China: In December 2022, a China–GCC joint statement supporting a peaceful solution to the dispute through bilateral negotiations or the International Court of Justice was objected to Iran. In June 2024, China stated its position on the islands remained unchanged. It also repeated its position in a joint statement with UAE in December 2025.
- Russia: In July 2023, Russia joined GCC language supporting a peaceful solution to the issue through bilateral negotiations or the ICJ.
- France: In March 2025, the French foreign ministry stated that France “has always supported and continues to support” a peaceful solution to the dispute through bilateral engagement between Iran and the UAE on the basis of international law.
- United Kingdom: The British government has maintained its support for the matter to be resolved peacefully at the ICJ between and he parties and called a visit by Iranian president Mahmoud Ahmadinejad to Abu Musa "highly unfortunate". In September 2023, a GCC-UK ministerial joint statement reiterated support for the UAE’s call for a peaceful solution to the dispute over Greater Tunb, Lesser Tunb and Abu Musa through bilateral negotiations or the International Court of Justice, in accordance with international law.
- United States: In a September 2024 UAE–US joint statement issued during UAE president Mohamed bin Zayed’s visit to Washington, the two sides supported a peaceful resolution of the dispute through bilateral negotiations or the ICJ, consistent with international law.

== Memorandum of understanding ==
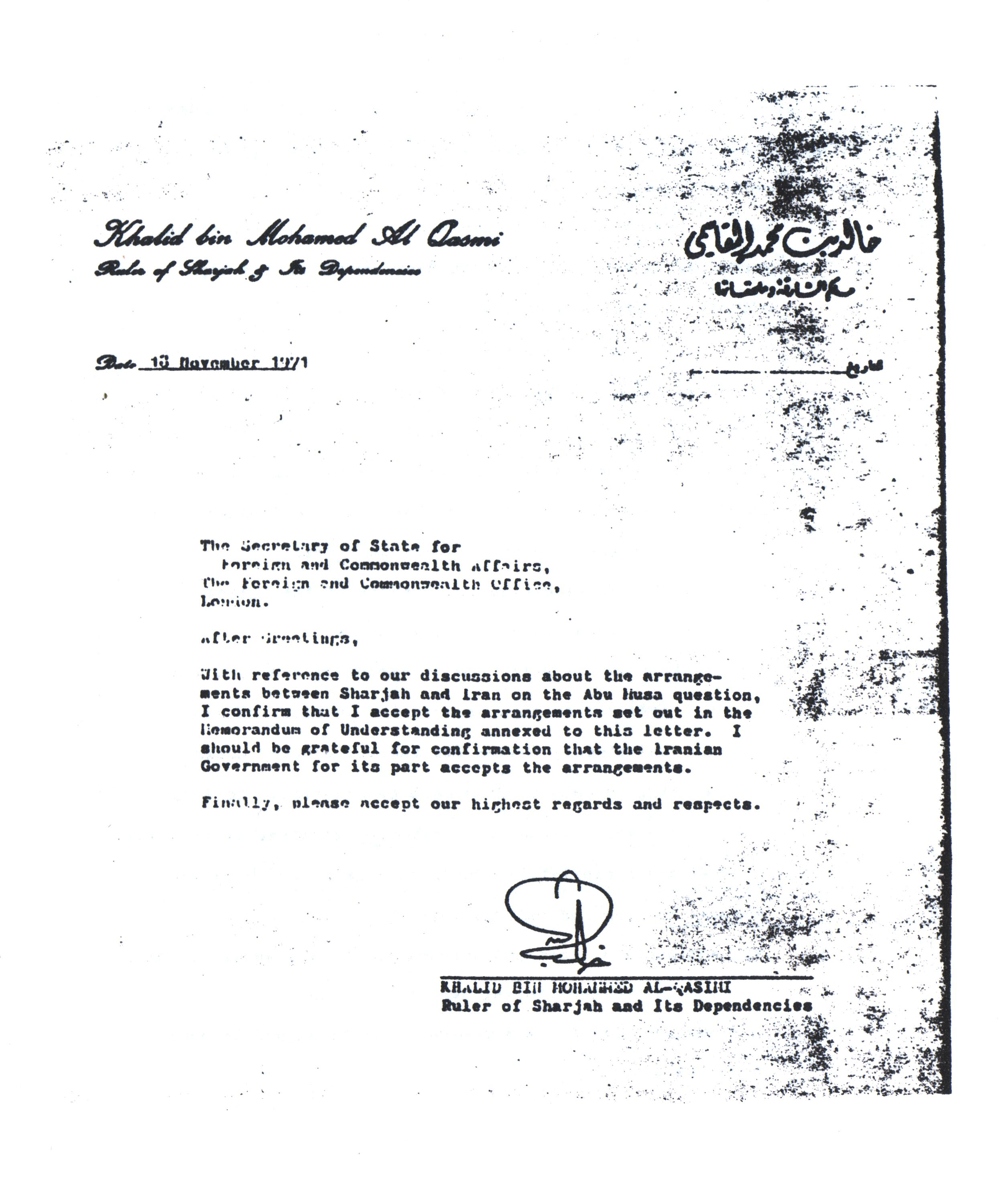
Ruler of Sharjah asks the British foreign secretary for Iranian acceptance of the MOU

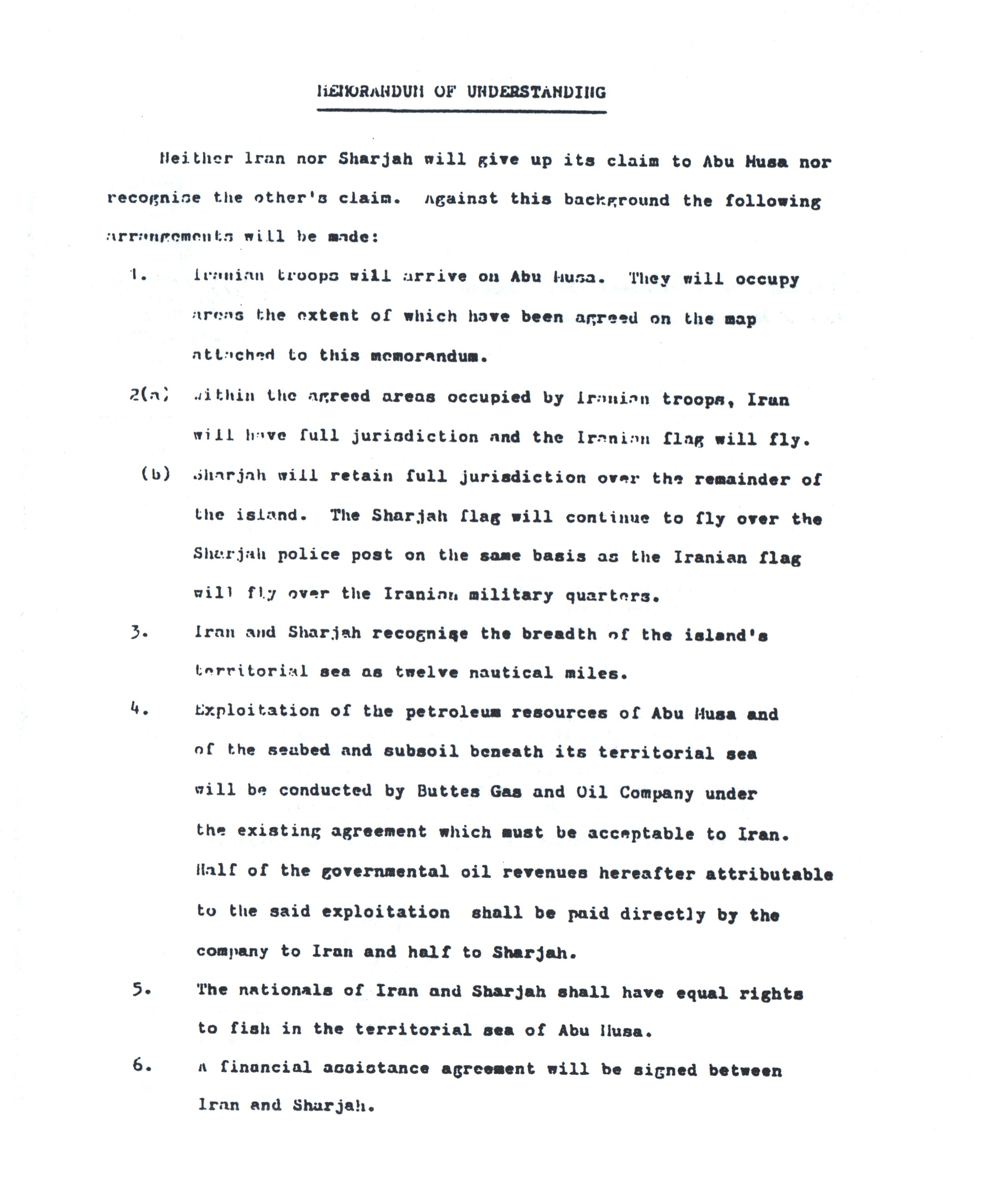
The memorandum of understanding as attached to the letter of 18 November 1971 from the ruler of Sharjah to the British foreign secretary

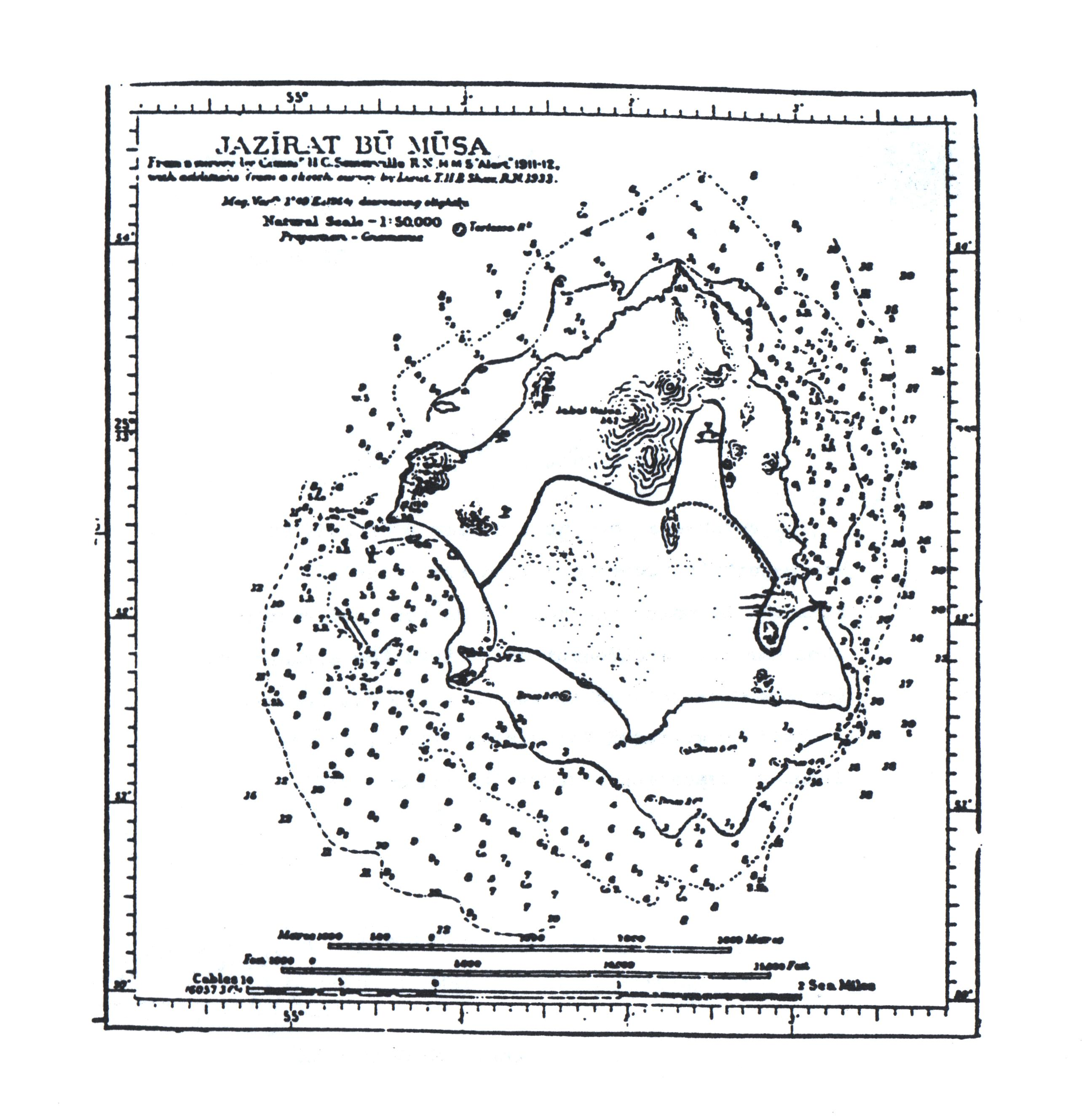
Official map of Abu musa island attached to the memorandum of understanding of November 1971

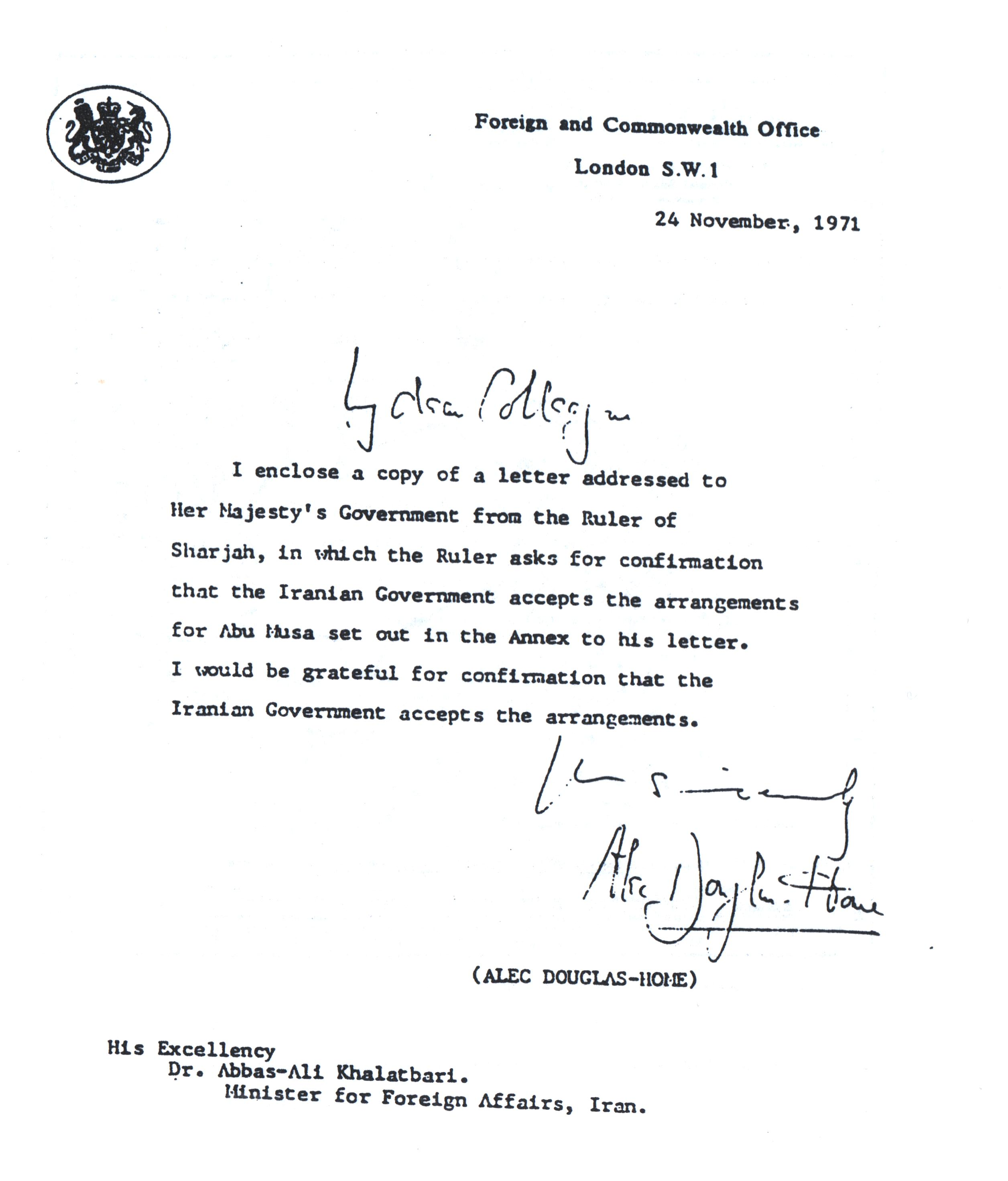
Letter of 24 November 1971 from the British foreign secretary to the Iranian minister of foreign affairs asking for Iranian acceptance of the MOU

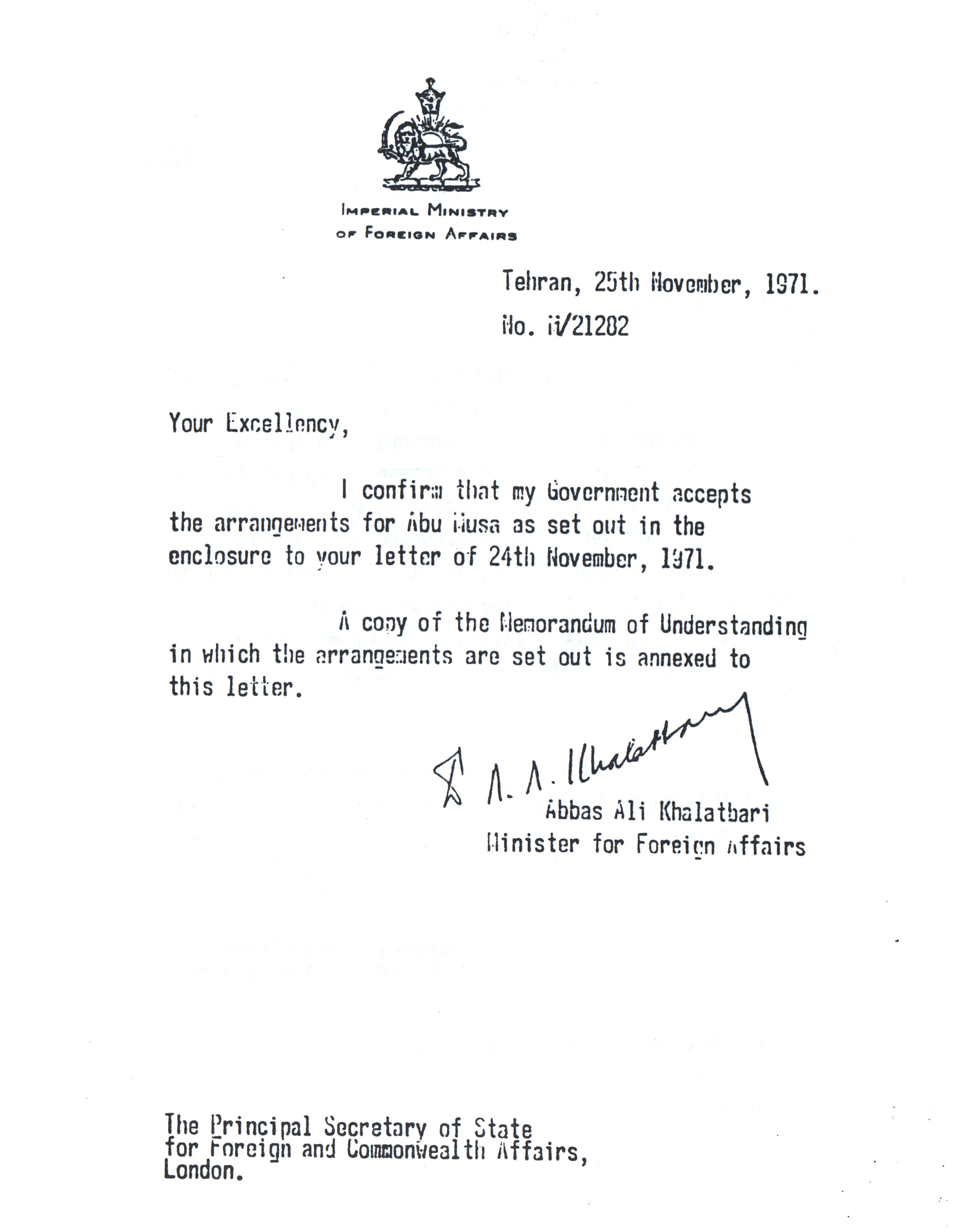
Letter of 25 November 1971 from the Iranian foreign minister to the British foreign secretary concerning Iran's acceptance of the MOU

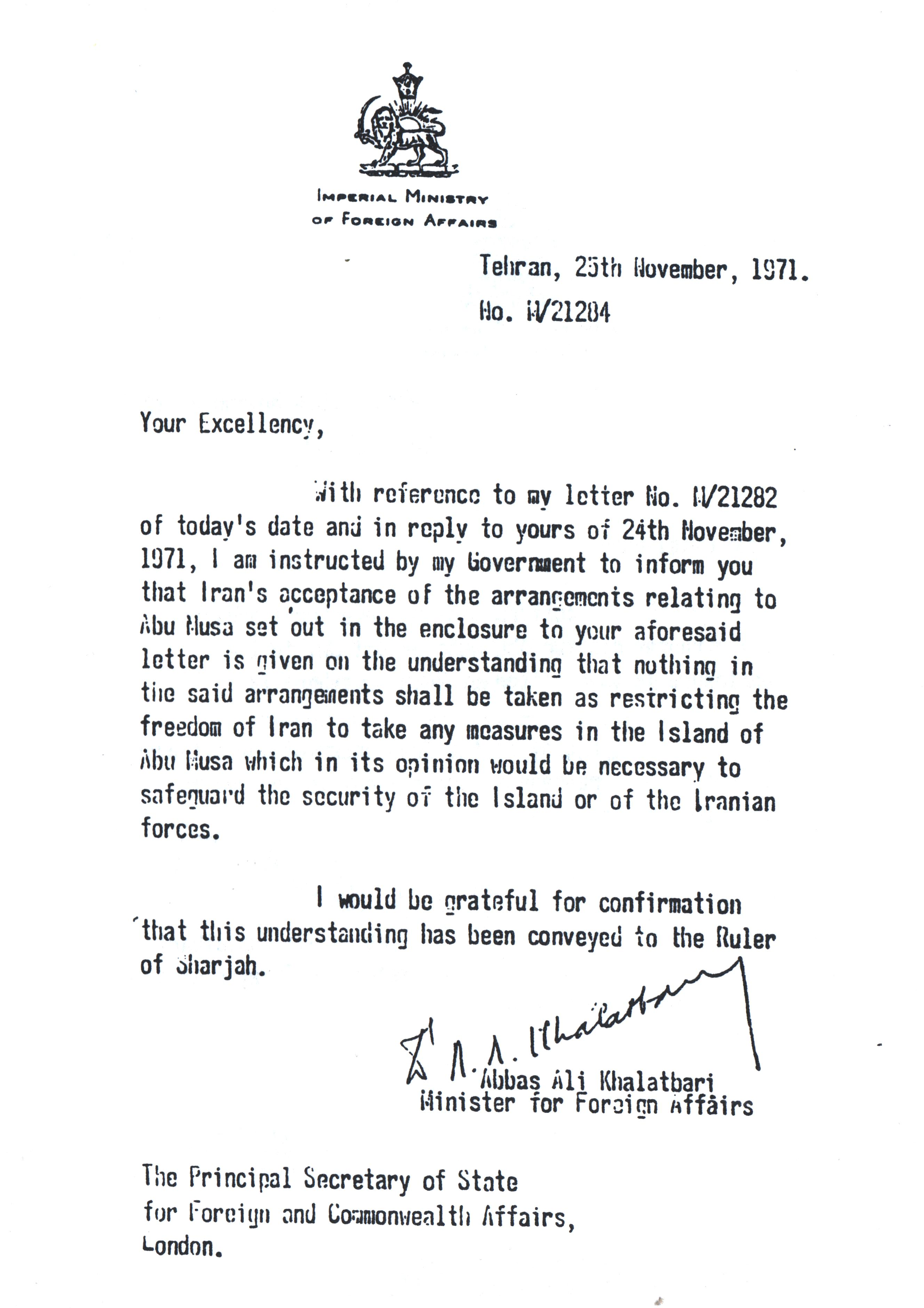
Letter of 25 November 1971 from the Iranian foreign minister to the British foreign secretary spelling out Iran's conditions and warnings relevant to Iran's acceptance of the MOU

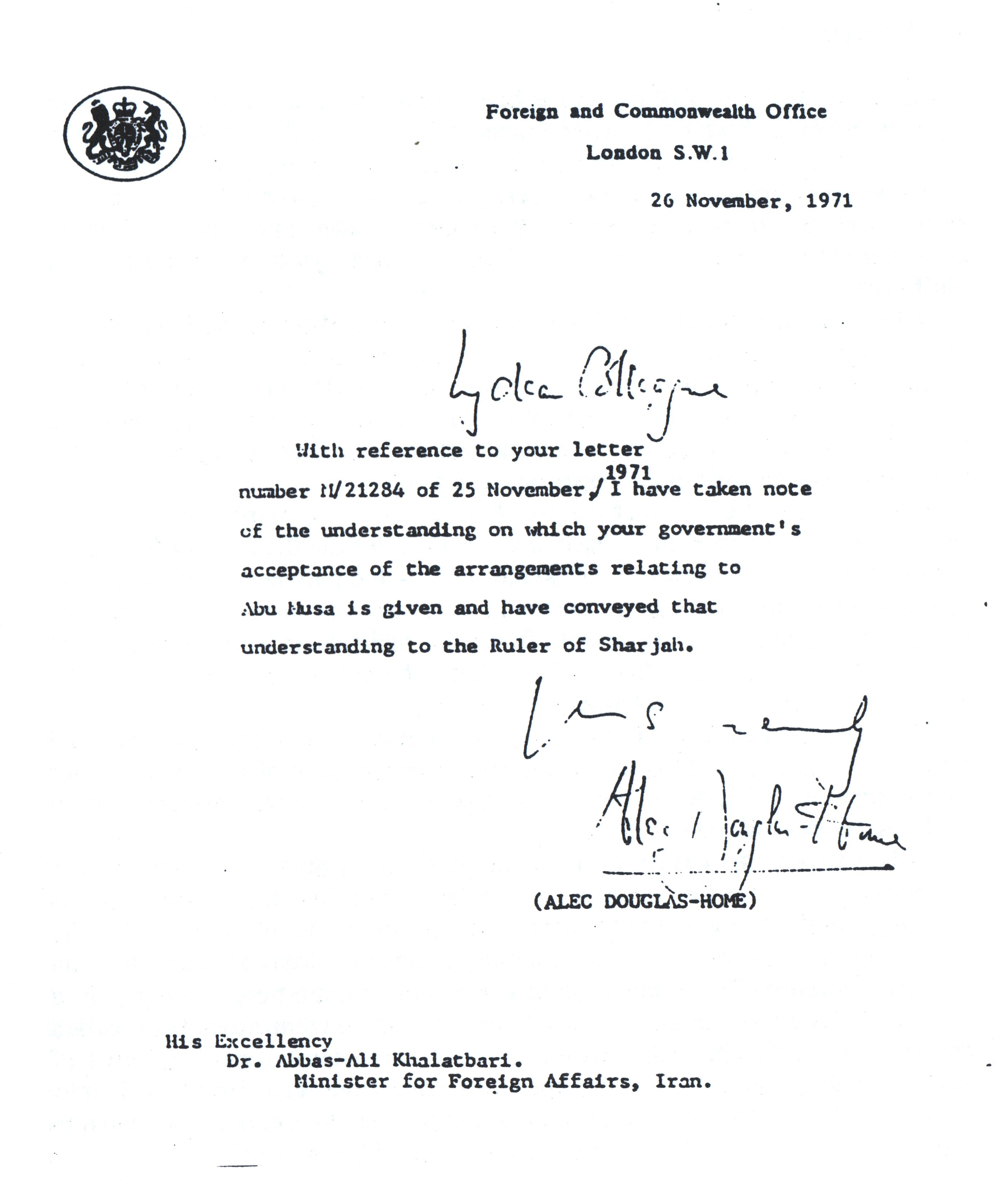
Letter of 26 November 1971 from the British foreign secretary to the Iranian foreign minister informing him that Iran's conditions and warnings had been conveyed to the ruler of Sharjah. (It was agreed that an absence of reply from the ruler of Sharjah to this letter would amount to his acceptance of Iran's conditions and warnings.)

== See also ==
- Iran–United Arab Emirates relations
