= Tunb Rural District =

Rural district in Hormozgan province, Iran

Tunb Rural District Persian: دهستان تنب
- Rural District
- Location within Iran
- Coordinates: 26°20′09″N 54°45′25″E
- Country: Iran
- Province: Hormozgan
- County: Abumusa
- District: Tunb
- Capital: Tunb-e Bozorg

Population (2016)
  - Total: 1,148
- Time zone: UTC+3:30 (IRST)

Tunb Rural District (Persian: دهستان تنب) is in Tunb District of Abumusa County, Hormozgan province, Iran. It is administered from the city of Tunb-e Bozorg.

== Demographics ==
=== Population ===
At the time of the 2006 National Census, the rural district's population was 155 in 49 households. There were 498 inhabitants in 60 households at the following census of 2011. The 2016 census measured the population of the rural district as 1,148 in 40 households. The most populous of its four villages was Tunb-e Bozorg (now a city), with 690 people.
