= Sirri Rural District =

Rural district in Hormozgan province, Iran

Sirri Rural District Persian: دهستان سیری
- Rural District
- Location within Iran
- Coordinates: 25°52′40″N 54°45′01″E
- Country: Iran
- Province: Hormozgan
- County: Abumusa
- District: Central
- Capital: Sirri

Population (2016)
  - Total: 2,041
- Time zone: UTC+3:30 (IRST)

Sirri Rural District (Persian: دهستان سیری) is in the Central District of Abumusa County, Hormozgan province, Iran. Its capital is the village of Sirri.

== History ==
Sirri Rural District was created in the Central District after the 2006 National Census.

== Demographics ==
=== Population ===
At the time of the 2011 census, the rural district's population was 1,304 in 36 households. The 2016 census measured the population of the rural district as 2,041 in 27 households. Its only village was Sirri, with 2,041 people.
