= Abu Musa Mombasa =

Pakistani member of al-Shabaab

- Military career
- Allegiance: Al-Shabaab
- Rank: Chief of security and training operations

Abu Musa Mombasa is a Pakistani member of the Somali militant paramilitary group al-Shabaab and has served as the group's chief of security and training operations. According to African Union Mission for Somalia (AMISOM), Musa came to Somalia as a jihadist in 2009. He replaced Saleh Ali Nabhan who was killed in a US military operation.
