= Saqr bin Sultan Al Qasimi =

- Sheikh
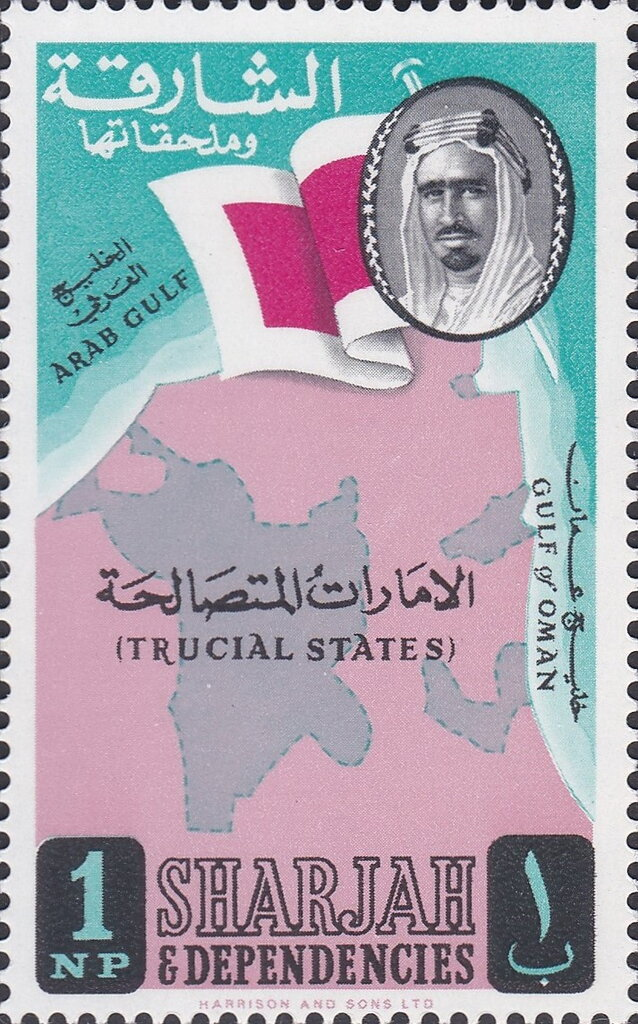
- Sheikh Saqr on a 1963 stamp

Ruler of Sharjah
- Reign: May 1951 – 24 June 1965
- Predecessor: Sultan bin Saqr Al Qasimi II
- Successor: Khalid bin Mohammed Al Qasimi
- Born: 1924
- Died: 9 November 1993 (aged 68–69)
- Issue: Khalid bin Saqr al Qasimi; Sultan bin Saqr al Qasimi (1947–)
- House: Al Qasimi
- Father: Sultan bin Saqr Al Qasimi II

Saqr bin Sultan Al Qasimi (1924 – 9 November 1993) was the ruler of the Emirate of Sharjah, a Trucial State and today one of the United Arab Emirates, from May 1951 to 24 June 1965.

Acceding to rule Sharjah on the death of his father in 1951, he was removed following a bloodless coup when he lost the support both of the Al Qasimi family and British administrators.

Exiled to Egypt, he returned to Sharjah in February 1972 with a group of mercenaries and attempted to mount a coup which failed, resulting in the murder of the-then ruler of Sharjah and founding father of the United Arab Emirates, Khalid bin Muhammad Al Qasimi.

Saqr's surrender was taken by Sheikh Mohammed bin Rashid Al Maktoum at the head of the Union Defence Force.

== Arab nationalism ==
Saqr was the eldest son of Sultan bin Saqr Al Qasimi II, who ruled 1924–51, and duly acceded on Sultan's death.

Saqr was a fervent Arab nationalist and supporter of the Arab League. Founded in 1945, the Arab League gave voice to a growing movement in the Arab world in support of a pan-Arab identity during the post-war tide of Arab independence. With the British Empire collapsing, a generation of newly confident (if essentially autocratic) Arab leaders emerged.

That pan-Arab identity was lent tremendous impetus by the creation of the state of Israel in 1948 and the failure of Arab armies to intercede in that process. If it had a figurehead, it had to be the Egyptian charismatic, Gamal Abdel Nasser. Egyptian radio’s Sawt Al Arab, ‘Voice of the Arabs’, fed Nasser’s words out to a receptive audience across the Middle East and North Africa. In 1956, Nasser had successfully faced down the disastrous attempt by British, French and Israeli forces to collude in a military operation to take over the newly nationalised Suez Canal and the incident boosted Nasser's standing in the Arab world, entirely at the expense of the British.

=== Development funds ===
Although the British had instituted the Trucial States Council in 1952 and allocated a Trucial States Development Budget, it was a meagre fund and did little to bolster the limited funds of the Trucial States' rulers. Abu Dhabi would not strike oil until 1956 and the revenue from oil exploration concessions formed much of the income of the Trucial rulers. When the Arab League approached them with offers of a significant development fund, the Trucial rulers formed a ready audience.

In October 1964, an Arab League delegation visited the area, headed by Egyptian diplomat and Arab League Secretary-General Abdel Khaleq Hassouna, on a ‘mission of brotherhood’. The Arab League proposed to create a £5 million development fund for the Trucial States. Saqr bin Sultan supported the opening of an Arab League office in Sharjah, an action in which he was joined by Saqr bin Mohammed Al Qasimi, the ruler of Ras Al Khaimah.

A wave of demonstrations broke out in the streets of the Trucial States, with anti-British sentiment growing. Having long maintained 'British prestige' on the Trucial Coast, British administrators were alarmed at the strength of sentiment and at its source - the Nasserite movement and its Soviet backers. British officials petitioned the Trucial rulers to turn down the Arab League offer, citing previous treaties whereby the Trucial Rulers had undertaken not to countenance dealing with any foreign government than the British. In the face of this campaign, Saqr was obstinate, even when British officials threatened to close his airspace and shut down Sharjah's power station.

The British increased their own funding to the Trucial States Development Fund until it stood at £2.5 million, but the rulers of the Northern States weren't impressed: as the ruler of Ajman, Rashid bin Humaid Al Nuaimi, was quoted as saying, '5 million pounds will go further than 2.5 million pounds.'

=== Saqr's removal ===
In 1965, Terence Clark, deputy to Glencairn Balfour Paul, the British Political Agent in Dubai (Balfour-Paul himself having been taken ill), deposed Saqr in a bloodless palace coup. The Trucial Oman Scouts picketed Sharjah Fort and took the surrender of the soldiers there, as well as that of Saqr’s brother, Abdullah bin Sultan Al Qasimi. Abdullah was accompanied by the son of the Ruler of Ras Al Khaimah, Khalid bin Saqr bin Muhammad Al Qasimi.

Saqr was then exiled to Bahrain and eventually Cairo. His cousin, Khalid bin Mohammed Al Qasimi succeeded him as ruler of Sharjah on 25 June 1965.

== Failed coup ==
On 24 January 1972, following soon after the creation of the United Arab Emirates on 2 December 1971, Saqr returned to Sharjah from Egypt with a number of mercenaries and seized power in an attempted coup. The group took control of the Ruler's palace at approximately 2:30 PM, with reports of gunfire and grenade explosions within the palace. Besieged by the Union Defence Force, which arrived an hour later, Saqr finally gave himself up in the early hours of 25 January to UAE Minister of Defence, Sheikh Mohammed bin Rashid Al Maktoum. However, Khalid was murdered in the fighting.

Saqr was handed over to Sheikh Zayed's custody by Mohammed and, according to Balfour-Paul, 'dropped in an underground hole in Buraimi.' Other sources assert that he was in fact tried and imprisoned until 1979 and then, upon his release, went into exile once again to Cairo.
