= Greater and Lesser Tunbs =

Group of twin islands in the Strait of Hormuz administered by Iran

Disputed islands Native name: Persian: تنب بزرگ و تنب کوچک (Tonb-e Bozorg and Tonb-e Kuchak)
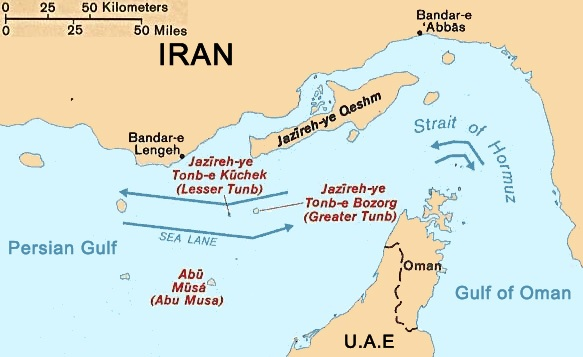
- Greater and Lesser Tunb islands in the Persian Gulf
- Other names: Arabic: طنب الكبرى وطنب الصغرى (Tunb el-Kubra and Tunb el-Sughra)

Geography
- Location: Persian Gulf
- Coordinates: Greater: 26°15′N 55°16′E; Lesser: 26°14′N 55°08′E
- Total islands: 2
- Area: 10.3 km^{2} (4.0 sq mi) (Greater); 2 km^{2} (0.77 mi^{2}) (Lesser)

Administration
- Iran
- Province: Hormozgan
- County: Bumusa

Demographics
- Population: around 300

Greater Tunb and Lesser Tunb (Persian: تنب بزرگ, romanized: Tonb-e Bozorg; Arabic: طنب الكبرى, romanized: Tunb el-Kubra) are two small islands in the eastern Persian Gulf, close to the Strait of Hormuz. They lie at 26°15′N 55°16′E and 26°14′N 55°08′E, some 12 kilometres (7.5 mi) from each other and 20 kilometres (12 mi) south of the Iranian Qeshm Island. The islands are administered by Iran as part of its Hormozgan province, however their sovereignty is disputed by the United Arab Emirates, which claims them as part of the Emirate of Ras al-Khaimah.

Greater Tunb has a surface area of 10.3 km^{2} (4.0 sq mi). It is known for its red soil. There are conflicting descriptions about its population: While some sources state there are between a few dozen and a few hundred inhabitants, others describe the island as having no native civilian population.

There is reported to be an Iranian garrison and naval station, an aircraft runway, a fish storage facility and a red-soil mine. Lesser Tunb has a surface of 2 km^{2} (0.77 sq mi) and is uninhabited with the exception of a small airfield, harbour, and entrenched Iranian military unit.

== Toponymy ==
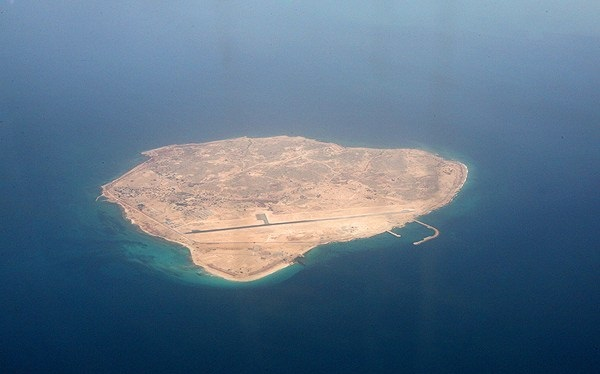
A photograph of the Greater Tunb

The toponymy of Tonb is in all likelihood of Persian origin. In the local Persian dialect(s) of southern Persia, the noun Tomb and Tonb, with its diminutive Tonbu or Tombu, as it applied to Lesser Tonb (Nāmiuh or Nābiuh Tonb), means "hill" or "low elevation", cfr. Medieval Latin tumba and Ancient Greek tymbos, with the same meaning, roots for "tomb".

The terms have the same meaning in the larger Dari Persian language system. This explains in part the traces of tonb and tonbu in the toponyms found in the Bushehr and Lengeh regions, some 300 miles (480 km) apart. There are other toponyms such as Tonb-e Seh in Tangestān and Tonbānu on Qeshm island.

Etymologically, the word TNB (ط-ن-ب) is also a proper Arabic word, which means to anchor, according to the Medieval Arab linguist Ibn Fares.

== History ==
The Greater and Lesser Tunbs in the Persian Gulf

Reference to Great Tonb as an Iranian island is found in Ibn Balkhi's 12th-century Farsnameh and Hamdallah Mustawfi Kazvini's 14th-century Nuzhat al-Qulub. The Tonbs were dominions of the Kings of Hormuz from 1330 or so until Hormuz's capitulation to the Portuguese in 1507.

The Tonbs remained a part of the Hormuzi-Portuguese administration until 1622, when the Portuguese were expelled from the Persian littoral by the Persian central government. During this period, the human geography, commerce, and territorial administration of the Tonbs, along with Abu Musa and Sirri islands, became intimately connected with the province of Fars, notably the Persian ports of Bandar Lengeh and Bandar Kang, and the nearby Qeshm and Hengam islands.

It has been remarked, in the context of the limits of the Persian empire in the Persian Gulf in the middle of the 18th century, that "[a]ll the islands off the Persian coast, from Kharqu and Kharaq in the north to Hormoz and Larak in the south, were rightly Persian, though many were in the hands of Arab tribes". Consistent with this, the British in 1800 were also of the belief that "[a]lthough the King exercises no positive authority over any of the islands of the Persian Gulf, those on the northern shore are all considered as part of the Empire".

An 1804 map of German origin showed the southern coast of Iran as the habitat of the "Bani Hule" tribe and the islands, coloured in the same orange, were designated as "Thunb unbenohul". The "Bani Hule" or Howalla were a loosely defined grouping of peoples of distant Arab origin but with longstanding residence on the Iranian coast. Regardless of the spelling of the toponym as "Tonb", be it from the Arabic tÂonb (abode) or from the Persian tonb (hill), the attribution to the larger island of this epithet highlighted the islands' intimate association with the Persian coast and its inhabitants.

One of the clans belonging to the Howalla or "Bani Hule" off the Persian coast was that of the Qasimi. Their Arab tribal origins are not as clearly established as is their Persian geographical origin immediately prior to their rise to notoriety in the lower Persian Gulf. This occurred in the 18th century, when the Qasimi established themselves as rulers of Ras Al Khaimah on the southern (Arabian) shore of the Strait of Hormuz, as well as governing Bandar Lengeh on the northern (Persian) shore, effectively becoming pirate overlords of the Strait and resisting a British attempt to dislodge them. The Tunbs thus fell under Qasimi control for some 100 years, originating the present-day dispute.

=== 18th century ===
In the 1720s, the Qasami emigrated from the Persian coast and established themselves as a force in Sharjah and Julfar (Ras al-Khaimah, now part of UAE). In the period 1747–1759, a branch of the Qasemi from Sharjah established itself on the Persian littoral, but was expelled in 1767.

By 1780, the Qasemi branch was re-established on the Persian coast and began to feud with other coastal tribes over pasturage in the islands off Langeh. The Iranian argument for the ownership of the disputed islands is that the Qasami controlled the islands while they were located on the Persian coast, not when they later emigrated to the UAE coast. In April 1873, the islands were reported as a dependency of the Persian Fars province to the British Resident, which the Resident acknowledged.

In the period 1786–1835 the official British opinion, surveys, and maps identified the Tonbs as part of Langeh, subject to the government of the province of Fars. Chief among them were the works of Lt. John McCluer (1786), political counselor John Macdonald Kinneir (1813), and Lt. George Barns Brucks (1829).

=== 19th century ===
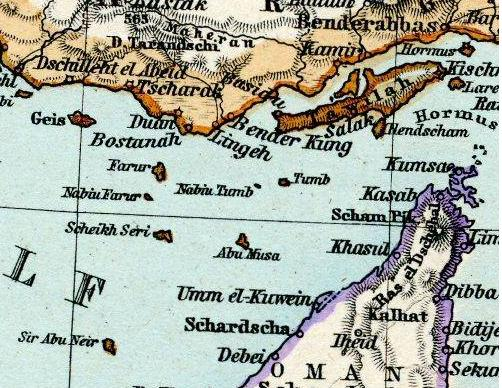
A map by Adolf Stieler showing Abu Musa and Greater and Lesser Tunbs.

In 1835, the Bani Yas attacked a British ship off Greater Tonb. In the ensuing maritime peace arranged by the British Political Resident Samuel Hennell, a restrictive line was established between Abu Musa and Sirri islands, and pledges were obtained from the tribes of the lower Persian Gulf not to venture their war boats north of the line. In January 1836, in view of Sirri and Abu Musa being pirate lairs themselves, Hennell's successor, Major James Morrison, modified the restrictive line to run from Sham on the Trucial Coast to a point ten miles south of Abu Musa to Sáir Abu Noayr island.

In either of its configurations, the restrictive line placed the Tonbs outside of the reach of the war boats of the Qasemi, Bani Yas, and other tribes of the lower Persian Gulf. The 1835 maritime truce was made permanent in 1853 after a series of earlier extensions. Force being no longer a viable option for settlement of disputes, especially on the part of the Qasemi of the lower Persian Gulf, the enforcement of Qasemi's claims to islands such as Abu Musa and Greater Tonb became a subject for the British colonial administration in the Persian Gulf. In that context, the Resident and its agents on several occasions (1864, 1873, 1879, 1881) had been seized with the question of the ownership of the Tonbs, but the British government had refused to go along with the claims of the Qasemi of the lower Persian Gulf.

In the period 1836–1886, the official British surveys, maps, and administrative reports continued to identify the Tonbs as part of Langeh, subject to the government of Fars province. Among them were the works of Lt. Colonel Robert Taylor (1836), the Resident A.B. Kemball (1854), the Resident Lewis Pelly (1864), The Persian Gulf Pilot (1864), an admiralty publication, the 1870 (second) edition of The Persian Gulf Pilot, and the 1886 Map of Persia, which was issued by the intelligence branch of the British war office and showed the Tonbs in the colour of Persia.

Until 1886, the British acknowledged Persian ownership of the islands. In February 1887, the Persian central government reorganised the ports of Bushehr, Langeh, and Bandar Abbas, together with their dependent districts and islands, into a new administrative unit called the Persian Gulf Ports and placed it under the charge of a member of the Qajar royal family, dissolving the Qasami governorship later in September. These and other Persian actions prompted the British to change their stance on the ownership of the islands due to suspicion that the new Persian policy was influenced by German and Russian interests.

In August 1888, Britain decided to acquiesce in the Persian actions on Sirri, leaving alone the concerns over Tonb, even though the Persian government's rebuff of the British protests had coupled their claim to Sirri with one to Tonb. The British regard for the Persian claim to Sirri, and perhaps Tonb, was affected significantly by the depiction of the Tonbs and Serri in the same colour as that of Persia in the 1886 Map of Persia, which Naser-al-Din Shah Qajar of Persia now astutely cited against the British when they protested the Persian actions on Sirri. The British acquiescence in the Persian claim to Serri demeaned the very theory on which the protest had been based.

The Qasemi administrators of Langa were of the same original stock as the Qasemi of the lower Persian Gulf. However, their rise on the Persian littoral and to the political administration of Langa and its dependencies were attributable primarily to their distance from the politics and piratical activities of their kinsmen in Sharjah and Ras al-Khaimah. Consequently, when the British government pacified the tribes of the lower Persian Gulf, which it had labelled as "pirates" (hence the term "Pirate Coast") in a series of naval engagements in the early 19th century, and then exacted from them a general surrender in 1820 and a maritime truce in the 1830s (hence the term "Trucial" Sheikhdoms), the Qasemi of the Persian coast were spared the ravages and humiliation suffered by their namesake in the lower Persian Gulf. The view that the Qasemi of Langeh had administered the Tonbs, Abu Musa, and Serri islands as the lieutenants of the Qasemi of the lower Persian Gulf was rebutted in 1932 by a legal adviser at the British foreign office and the head of its eastern department in 1934.

Besides the Persian territorial and political ambitions in the Persian Gulf, in the period 1888–1903 the British government was worried equally about French intrigues, and Russian and German naval and economic interests in the region. It had already been determined by the British that the Persian actions on Sirri and elsewhere in the Persian Gulf were inspired by Russia. In pursuit of a forward policy based on Curzon's views, which included the marking of the territories under their direct and indirect colonial control, the British government undertook a project to erect flagstaffs in a number of locations in the Persian Gulf.

In the pursuit of British imperial considerations, the lack of regard for Persian sensibilities was no problem. Already, in 1901, a British government memorandum openly suggested that, where strategic necessity required, Britain would seize any of the Persian islands. In March 1902, Curzon recommended that the British navy hoist a flag on Qeshm island in the case of necessity. On 14 June 1904, the Persian government removed its presence from Abu Musa and Greater Tonb subject to the reservations, as reported by the British minister.

In a note to the British minister, the Persian foreign minister stated that neither party should hoist flags in the islands until the settlement of the question of ownership, but the sheikh of Sharjah hoisted their flags three days later. In the Iranian annals of the diplomatic history of the Tonbs and Abu Musa, the Persian agreement to withdraw from the islands on 14 June 1904, subject to reservations, is known as the "status quo agreement." The re-flagging of the islands by Sharjah three days after the withdrawal of the Persians violated the status quo agreement, rendering moot the legal relevance of any subsequent presence and activity by Sharjah on the islands and also any by Ras al-Khaimah with respect to the Tonbs from 1921 onward.

=== 20th century ===
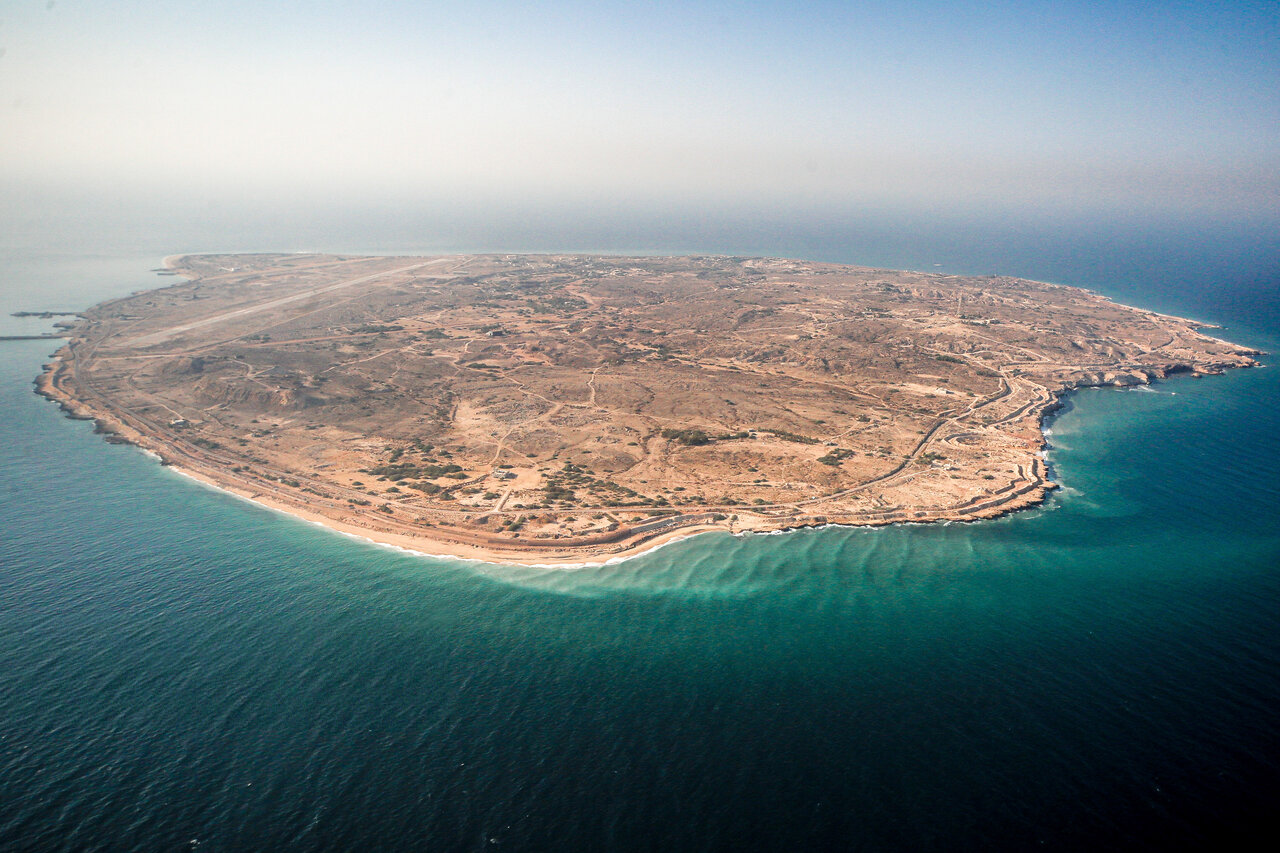
An aerial view of Greater Tunb

In the 20th century, several attempts at negotiations were made. On 29 November 1971, shortly before the end of the British protectorate and the formation of the UAE, Iran seized semi-control of Abu Musa under an agreement of joint administration together with Sharjah, with both sides nominally upholding their separate claims. On 30 November 1971, Iran forcibly seized control of the Tunb Islands and Abu Musa, against the resistance of the tiny Arab police force stationed there. Two British warships, the aircraft carriers HMS Eagle and HMS Albion, stood idle during the course of the invasion.

The Iranians were instructed not to open fire, and the first shots came from the Arab resistance which killed four Iranian marines and injured one. In his book Territorial Foundations of the Gulf States, Schofield states that according to some sources, the Arab civilian population of Greater Tunb of about 120 was then deported to Ras Al Khaimah, but according to other sources the island had already been uninhabited for some time.

On 9 December 1971, the representatives of the United Arab Emirates and other Arab countries protested the actions of Iran and the United Kingdom at a meeting of the United Nations Security Council.

=== Present situation ===
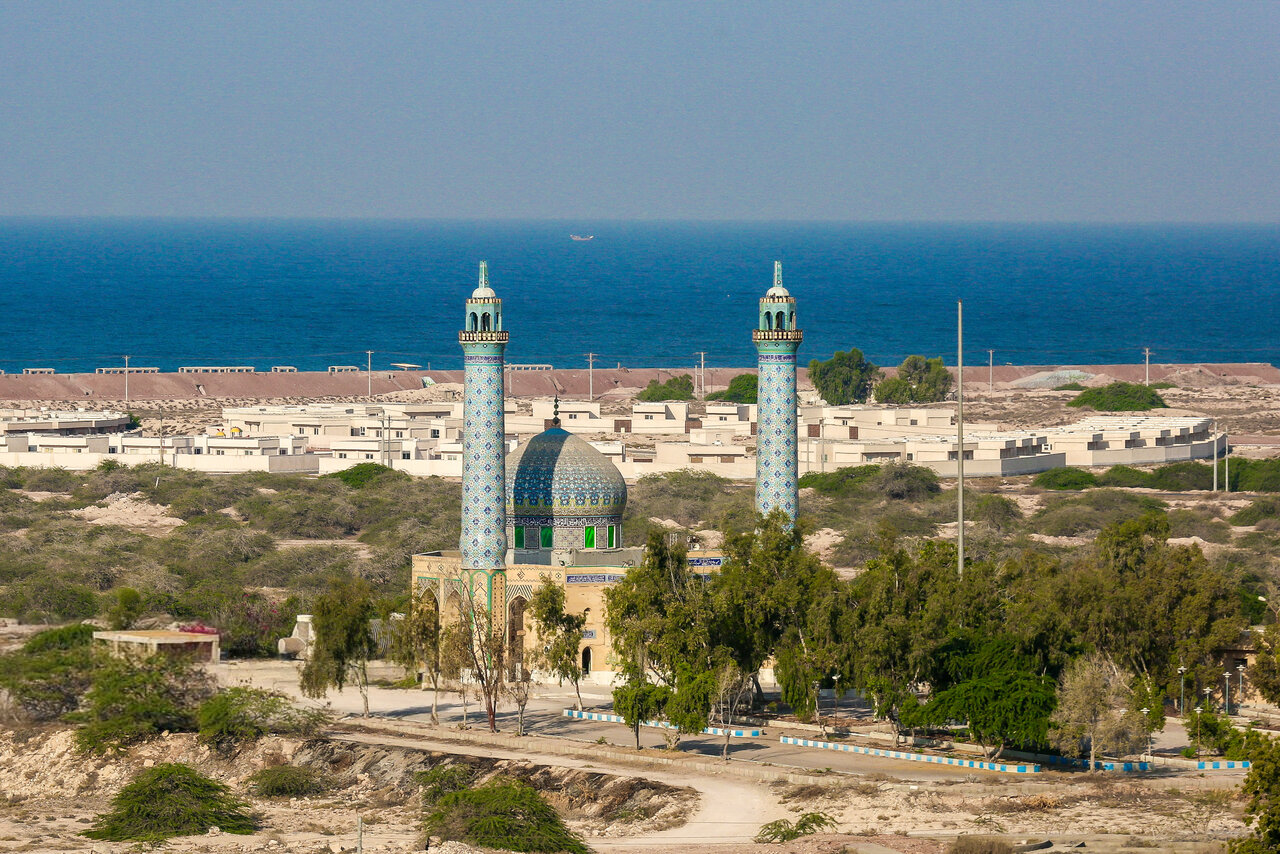
A mosque on the island of Greater Tunb

Shortly after the Iranian seizure, there would be a failed coup in Sharjah led by the Arab nationalist former Sheikh Saqr bin Sultan Al Qasimi in part due to the UAE's response to the seizure.

In the following decades, the issue remained a source of friction between the Arab states and Iran. The Cooperation Council for the Arab States of the Gulf repeatedly declared support for the UAE claims. Bilateral talks between the UAE and Iran in 1992 failed. The UAE have attempted to bring the dispute before the International Court of Justice, but Iran refuses to do so. Tehran says the islands always belonged to it as it had never renounced possession of the islands, and that they are an integral part of Iranian territory.

The emirate of Ras al-Khaimah argue that the islands were under the control of Qasimi sheikhs, a branch of which administered the port of Bandar Lengeh for the Persian government from c. 1789 to 1887, and UAE as the successor to the tribal patrimony of the tribe, may inherit their rights. Iran counters by stating that the local Qasimi rulers during a crucial part of the previous centuries were actually based on the Iranian, not the Arab, coast, and had thus has been Persian subjects. The UAE refers to the islands as "occupied".

These two islands are among the territories under the control and government of Iran. The Iranian government has established naval military bases on these islands to control the Strait of Hormuz. Along with nearby Abu Musa, it has been considered a possible US military objective in the 2026 Iran war.

In September 2026, the UAE, at the UN General Assembly, rejected Iran's "occupation of the [...] Emirati islands" and urged a peaceful solution, whether by negotiations or by recourse of the International Court of Justice.

On 29 October 2026, in a joint statement with the UAE, Canada recognized the islands along with Abu Musa as Emirati territory and called on Iran to end its "occupation" of the islands, receiving Iranian condemnation.
