= Abu Musa, Iran =

Abu Musa Persian: بوموسی
- City
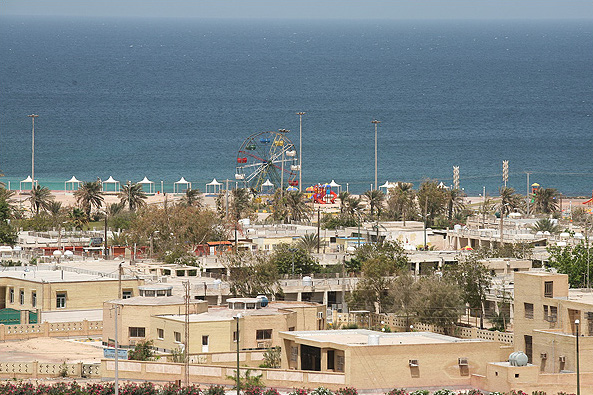
- Abu Musa city

- Location within Iran
- Coordinates: 25°53′09″N 55°01′42″E
- Country: Iran
- Province: Hormozgan
- County: Abumusa
- District: Central

Population (2016)
  - Total: 4,213
- Time zone: UTC+3:30 (IRST)

Abu Musa (Persian: بوموسی) (Note: Also romanized as Abū Mūsā) is a city in the Central District of Abumusa County, Hormozgan province, Iran, serving as capital of both the county and the district.

== Demographics ==
=== Population ===
At the time of the 2006 National Census, the city's population was 1,705 in 456 households. The following census in 2011 counted 3,461 people in 620 households. The 2016 census measured the population of the city as 4,213 people in 857 households.
