= Abu Musa =

Disputed island near the Strait of Hormuz

Disputed island
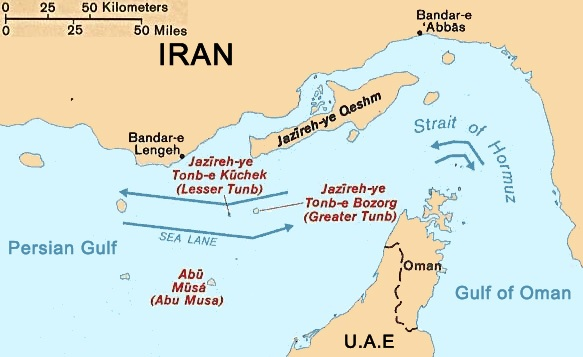
- Abu Musa in the Persian Gulf

- Location within Iran Location within Persian Gulf
- Interactive map of Abu Musa
- Other names: Persian: ابوموسی; Arabic: أبو موسى

Geography
- Location: Persian Gulf
- Coordinates: 25°52′N 55°02′E
- Total islands: 1
- Area: 12.8 km^{2} (4.9 sq mi)
- Highest elevation: 110 m (360 ft)
- Highest point: Mount Halva

Administration
- Iran
- Province: Hormozgan
- County: Abumusa
- Largest settlement: Abu Musa (pop. 1,953)

Demographics
- Population: 2,131 (2012)
- Pop. density: 166/km^{2} (430/sq mi)

Abu Musa Lighthouse
- Location: Abu Musa, Iran
- Coordinates: 25°53′07″N 55°02′02″E

Tower
- Construction: Masonry tower
- Shape: Short square tower atop building

Light
- Focal height: 130 m (430 ft)
- Range: 9 nmi (17 km; 10 mi)
- Characteristic: Fl W 8s

Abu Musa (Note: Persian: ابوموسی, IPA: [æbu mu'sɒ]; Arabic: أَبُو مُوسَى, IPA: [ʔa.buː ˈmuː.saː]) is a 12.8-square-kilometre (4.9 sq mi) island in the eastern Persian Gulf, near the entrance to the Strait of Hormuz. The island is currently administered by Iran.

Due to the depth of the sea, oil tankers and other large ships have to pass between Abu Musa and Greater and Lesser Tunbs, which makes these islands one of the most strategic points in the Persian Gulf. The island is under the administration of Iran, as part of Abumusa County, Hormozgan province. It is, however, claimed by the United Arab Emirates as part of its Sharjah emirate. It is a possible US military objective in the 2026 Iran war.

== Name ==
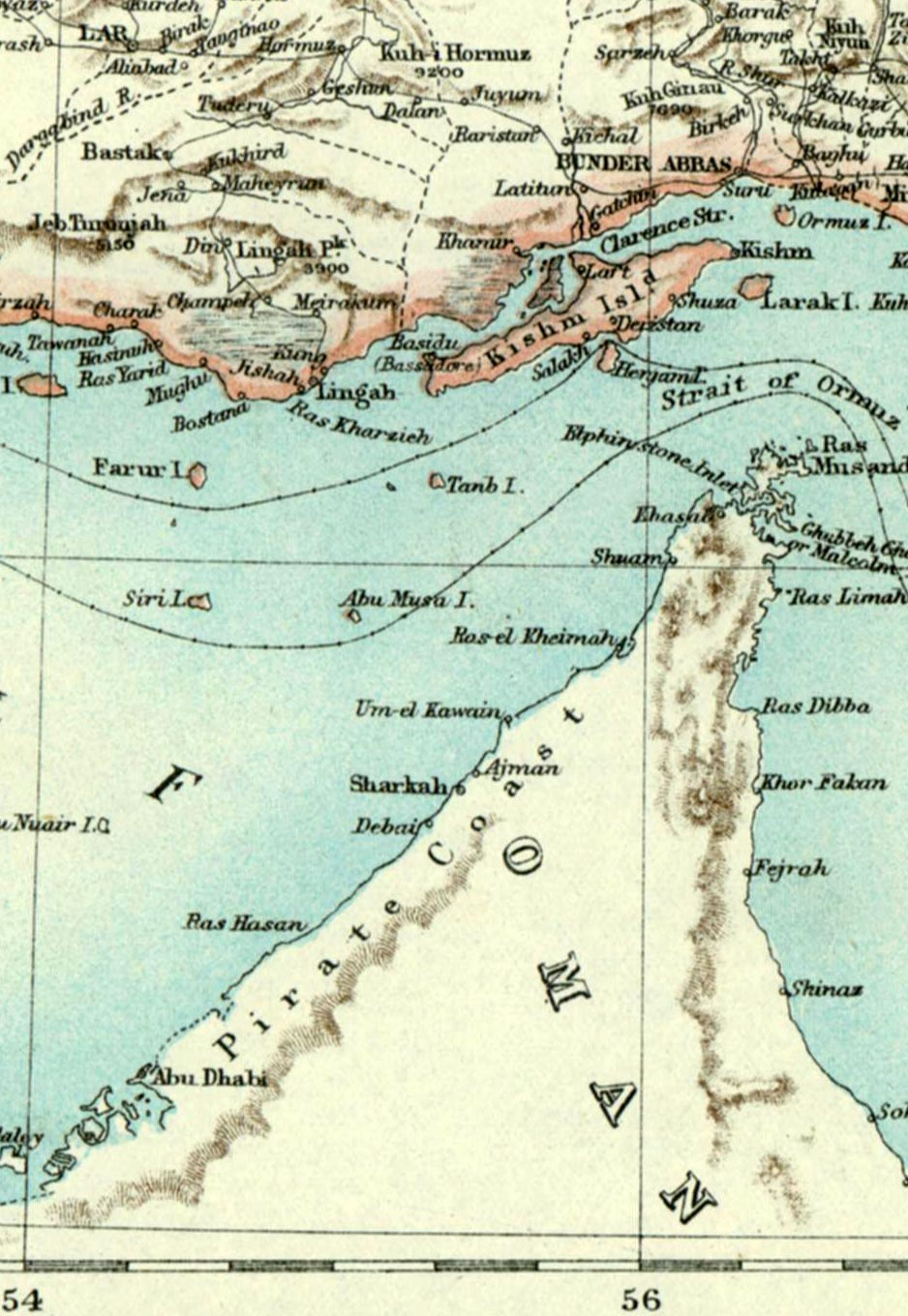
A map dated 1891 showing Abu Musa

Iranian inhabitants of Abu Musa call it "Gap-sabzu" (Persian: گپ‌سبزو), which in Persian means "the great green place". On old Persian maps, the island is called:

- "Boum-Ouw" (Persian: بوم‌اوو) or "Boum-Ouf" (Persian: بوم‌اوف) which in Persian means "Waterland".
- "Boum-Souz" (Persian: بوم‌سوز) or "Boum-Sou"/"Boum-Souw" (Persian: بوم‌سو) or "Gap-Sabzou" (Persian: گپ‌سبزو) which in Persian means "green land".

In recent centuries it, has also been called Bum Musa, Persian for "the land of Musa/Moses", instead of "Boum-Sou".

In Arabic sources, "Abu Musa" (Arabic: أبو موسى) comes from Abu Musa al-Ash'ari, a companion of Muhammad, who stayed on the island in 643 CE before battling the Persians.

== Geography ==
Abu Musa island is located 70 kilometres (43 mi) south of Bandar-e Shenas and 59 kilometres (37 mi) north-northwest of Sharjah. Of the 14 islands of Hormozgan, it is the farthest from the Iranian coast. Its highest point is the 110-metre (360 ft) Mount Halva. Abu Musa city is the center of the island.

The weather in Abu Musa is warm and humid, a better climate compared to other islands in the Persian Gulf. It has the most diverse ecosystem, but lacks suitable soil and water for farming. Fishing is the main industry for the locals.

It is served by the regional Abu Musa Airport.

== History ==
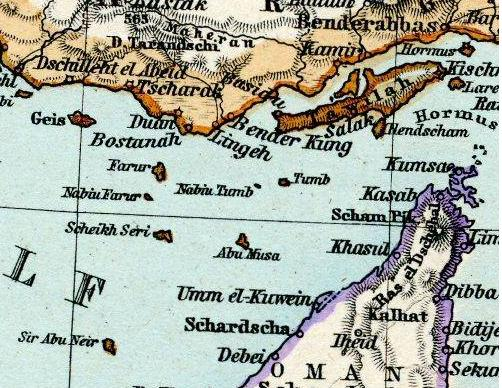
Abu Musa and other islands in the Persian gulf in a map by Adolf Stieler

The Persian Gulf region, including Abu Musa, was ruled by Iran during the pre-Islamic era. Remnants of early Iranian inhabitants in the region persist in areas such as northern Musandam, Bahrain, and al-Hasa. Evidence regarding Arab inhabitants on the southern coastline of the Persian Gulf before the Christian era remains sparse. During the early Islamic period, Abu Musa and its surroundings were ruled by the Umayyad and Abbasid caliphates, until its conquest by the Iranian Buyid dynasty in 935. Thereafter, local rulers in southern Iran managed these islands and ports with varying degrees of independence under dynasties such as the Seljuqs and Timurids. According to Davoud Bavand, a 13th century account by Yaqut al-Hamawi offers the first implied mention of Abu Musa, then under the authority of the Iranian ruler of the Kish Island. In the 16th century, the Portuguese Empire captured Abu Musa, which was later reconquered by Iran in 1622.

=== The early disputes ===
The sovereignty of Abu Musa is disputed between Iran, which administers the island, and the UAE, which has claimed the island since the formation of the federation in 1971 as the successor to Sharjah's prior administration. By common consent, the island had been under the control of the Al-Qasimi ruler of Sharjah. The island was covered by a protection treaty signed between the rulers of the Gulf and Britain as far back as 1819.

The dispute over the ownership of the island predates the establishment of the UAE, and the first historical record of the dispute was in 1904, when the Iranians lowered a local flag of the Trucial States and replaced it with an Iranian one. This was swiftly opposed by the British Empire's authorities, and it led to the Iranian forces withdrawing shortly after occupying the islands. They attempted to occupy them again in 1923.

In 1906, Salim bin Sultan, the uncle of Sharjah's ruler Saqr bin Khalid, awarded a concession for iron oxide deposit discovery on the island to three Arabs, whose workers extracted the mineral and agreed to sell it to Wonckhaus, a German enterprise. However, Saqr bin Khalid discovered and disagreed with the act, so he cancelled the grant. The workers were then removed from the island with assistance from the British, resulting in an international incident.

After 1908, the UK controlled the island along with the other British-held islands in the Persian Gulf, including what is today the UAE. In the late 1960s, the UK transferred administration of the island to the British-appointed Sharjah, one of the seven sheikhdoms that would later form the UAE.

For 20 consecutive days in 1964, Iranian forces occupied the territory, claiming that the landing was a military maneuver, before leaving.

After the UK announced in 1968 that it would end its administrative and military positions in the Persian Gulf, Iran moved again to attach the island politically to the mainland. On 30 November 1971, two days before the official establishment of UAE, Iran and Sharjah signed a Memorandum of Understanding. They agreed to allow Sharjah to have a local police station and to Iran stationing troops on the island according to the map attached to the Memorandum of Understanding.

The agreement divided the island's energy resources between the two signatories. "By agreeing to the pact, the tiny emirate prevented an invasion by Iran, which two days earlier had taken two other disputed islands, the Greater and Lesser Tunbs, which were even smaller and uninhabited."

=== Iranian takeover ===
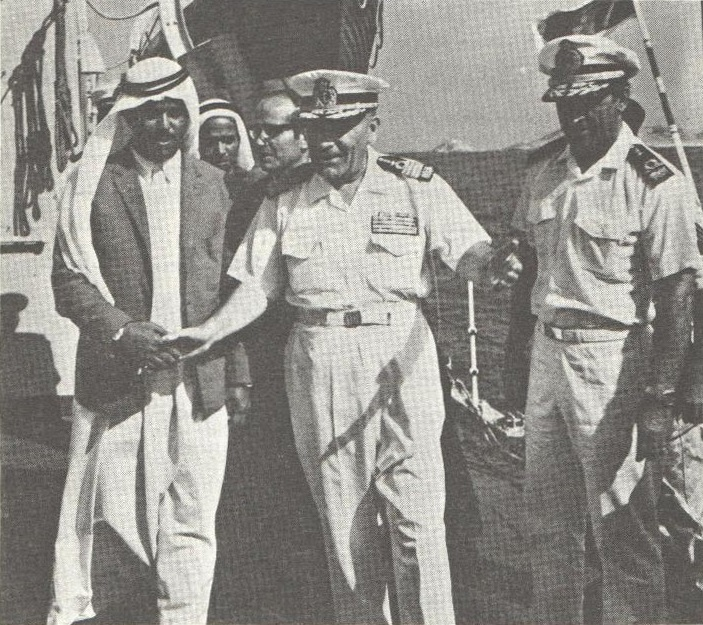
Sheikh Saqer welcoming Iranian troops of Iran's destroyer Artemiz in Abu Musa, 1971

On 30 November 1971, a day before the UK officially left the region, Iran moved troops onto the island who were officially welcomed by the Sheikh of Sharjah's brother, Sheikh Saqer.

=== UAE claim ===
The UAE took its sovereignty claim over Abu Musa and the two Tunb islands to a meeting of the United Nations Security Council of 9 December 1971. At that meeting, it was decided to "defer consideration of this matter to a later date". Iraq (Ahmed Hassan al-Bakr era), Syria, Kuwait, Algeria, South Yemen and Libya held the view that the territory rightfully belongs to the UAE. Since that time, the UAE has consistently called in public statements for either bilateral negotiations or by referring the issue to the International Court of Justice (or another form of international arbitration).

Saddam Hussein attempted to justify the Iran–Iraq War by claiming that one of the objectives was to "liberate" Abu Musa and the Tunbs in the Persian Gulf. In 1992, Iran expelled "foreign" workers who operated the UAE-sponsored school, medical clinic, and power-generating station.

The dispute has caused serious friction between Ras al-Khaimah and Sharjah on the one hand and some other emirates of the UAE on the other. Ras Al Khaimah advocates tough measures against Iran. Dubai believes that the conflict is unnecessary. The present ruler of Dubai, who is also Vice President, Prime Minister and Defence Minister of the UAE, Mohammed bin Rashid Al Maktoum, has earlier stated publicly that "he believes the tensions over the islands have been fabricated by the United States".

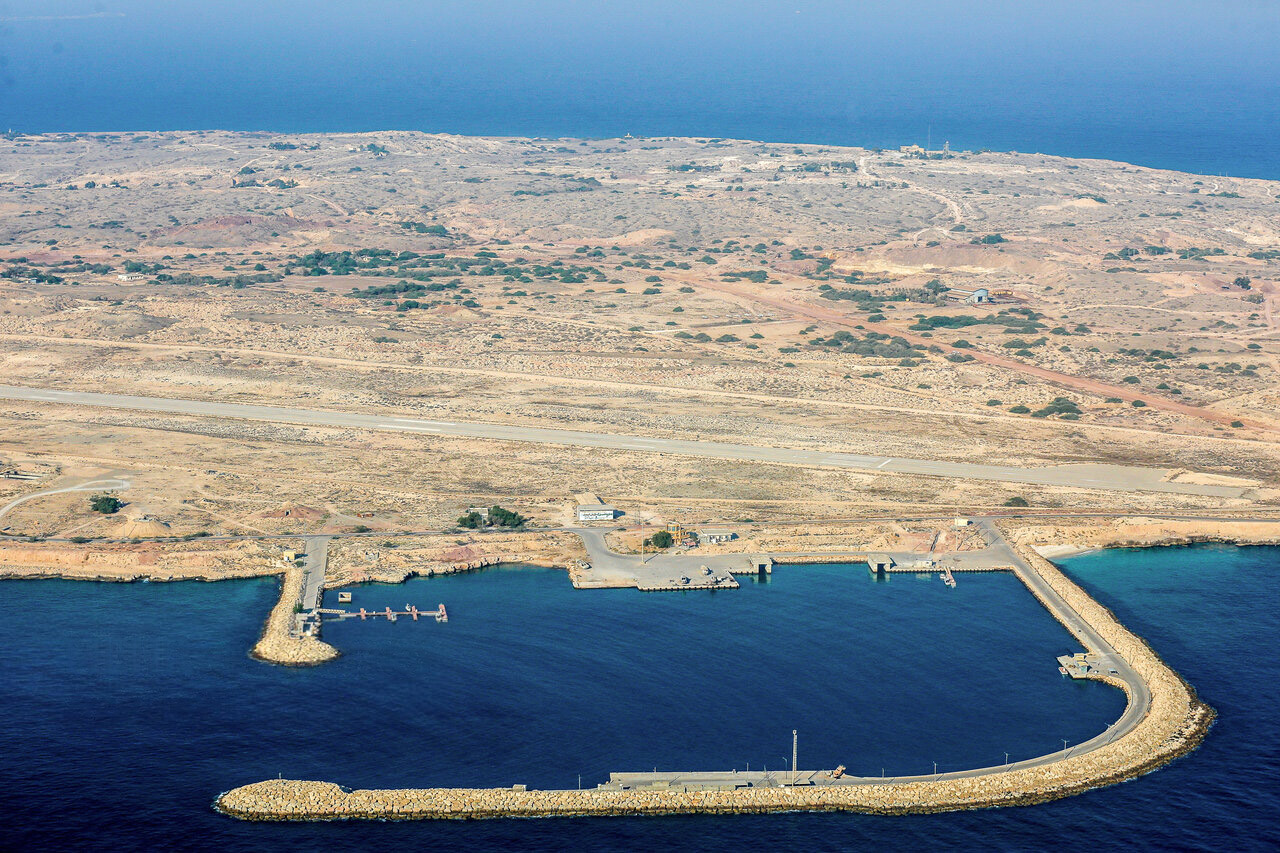
An aerial view of Abu Musa Island, November 2024

In 2012, a visit to the island by Iranian president Ahmedinejad provoked a diplomatic incident. Iran's historical claim to ownership over the islands traces back to the Parthian and Sasanian Empires, among others. Iran considers the island to have been occupied by the UK and refers to the agreement between Iran and the emirate of Sharjah in 1971.

In September 2026, the UAE, at the UN General Assembly, rejected Iran's "occupation of the [...] Emirati islands" and urged a peaceful solution, whether by negotiations or by recourse of the International Court of Justice.

On 29 October 2026, in a joint statement with the UAE, Canada recognized Abu Musa along with the Greater and Lesser Tunbs as Emirati territory and called on Iran to end its "occupation" of the islands, receiving Iranian condemnation.

=== 2026 Iran war ===
In July 2026, amid the Iran war, the US attacked Iranian government sites on the island.

== Demographics ==
In 2012, the island had about 2,131 inhabitants, making it Iran's smallest county. The city of Abu Musa had 1,953 inhabitants in 2012, up 248 from 2006.

Most of the native residents of the island speak the "Bandari" dialect of Persian.

UAE citizens living on the island allegedly face "great difficulties" with the lack of proper clinics and schools. Only one school exists on the island, and it is used by 150 students. Patients have to be transported to Sharjah to receive treatment, but that is sometimes not feasible because of the Iranian authorities. Iran allegedly delays or blocks UAE's school and medical supplies from entering the island.

== Climate ==
The island's climate is hot and arid. Classified as BWh under Köppen climate classification. The Island has warm to hot weather throughout the year, with all months averaging above 20 °C (68 °F). Almost all of its annual precipitation falls during the winter season.

Climate data for Abu Musa Island (normals 1991-2020 extremes 1984-2020)
Month	Jan	Feb	Mar	Apr	May	Jun	Jul	Aug	Sep	Oct	Nov	Dec	Year
Record high °C (°F)	28.2 (82.8)	30.0 (86.0)	36.0 (96.8)	39.6 (103.3)	41.8 (107.2)	42.0 (107.6)	45.0 (113.0)	42.6 (108.7)	43.0 (109.4)	43.0 (109.4)	35.0 (95.0)	30.6 (87.1)	45.0 (113.0)
Mean daily maximum °C (°F)	23.2 (73.8)	23.7 (74.7)	25.6 (78.1)	29.0 (84.2)	32.5 (90.5)	34.8 (94.6)	36.6 (97.9)	37.0 (98.6)	35.7 (96.3)	33.4 (92.1)	29.4 (84.9)	25.5 (77.9)	30.5 (87.0)
Daily mean °C (°F)	21.3 (70.3)	21.7 (71.1)	23.4 (74.1)	26.5 (79.7)	30.0 (86.0)	32.5 (90.5)	34.2 (93.6)	34.5 (94.1)	33.2 (91.8)	31.1 (88.0)	27.3 (81.1)	23.5 (74.3)	28.3 (82.9)
Mean daily minimum °C (°F)	18.3 (64.9)	18.7 (65.7)	20.4 (68.7)	23.3 (73.9)	26.7 (80.1)	29.0 (84.2)	30.9 (87.6)	31.0 (87.8)	29.5 (85.1)	27.2 (81.0)	23.8 (74.8)	20.3 (68.5)	24.9 (76.9)
Record low °C (°F)	11.0 (51.8)	8.0 (46.4)	11.6 (52.9)	15.8 (60.4)	19.2 (66.6)	23.0 (73.4)	26.2 (79.2)	26.2 (79.2)	24.0 (75.2)	19.0 (66.2)	16.4 (61.5)	11.0 (51.8)	8.0 (46.4)
Average precipitation mm (inches)	29.5 (1.16)	14.1 (0.56)	28.5 (1.12)	4.2 (0.17)	0.2 (0.01)	0.0 (0.0)	0.2 (0.01)	0.0 (0.0)	0.0 (0.0)	1.6 (0.06)	15.7 (0.62)	29.0 (1.14)	123 (4.85)
Average precipitation days (≥ 1.0 mm)	2.6	1.6	2.4	0.7	0.1	0.0	0.0	0.0	0.0	0.1	1.3	2.2	11
Average relative humidity (%)	60	64	69	70	72	73	70	69	68	64	58	60	66
Average dew point °C (°F)	13.0 (55.4)	14.4 (57.9)	17.0 (62.6)	20.4 (68.7)	24.1 (75.4)	26.8 (80.2)	27.8 (82.0)	27.7 (81.9)	26.4 (79.5)	23.2 (73.8)	18.0 (64.4)	15.0 (59.0)	21.2 (70.1)
Mean monthly sunshine hours	232	223	233	264	313	310	281	291	277	290	258	237	3,209
Average ultraviolet index	6	6	6	7	8	8	8	8	8	7	7	6	7
Source 1: NOAA NCEI
Source 2: IRIMO(extremes) Weather atlas(UV)

Climate data for Jazireh Abu Musa (1984–2010)
Month	Jan	Feb	Mar	Apr	May	Jun	Jul	Aug	Sep	Oct	Nov	Dec	Year
Record high °C (°F)	27.8 (82.0)	29.5 (85.1)	36.0 (96.8)	39.6 (103.3)	41.8 (107.2)	42.0 (107.6)	45.0 (113.0)	41.4 (106.5)	43.0 (109.4)	43.0 (109.4)	35.0 (95.0)	30.0 (86.0)	45.0 (113.0)
Mean daily maximum °C (°F)	23.0 (73.4)	23.9 (75.0)	25.5 (77.9)	28.9 (84.0)	32.5 (90.5)	34.5 (94.1)	36.3 (97.3)	36.7 (98.1)	35.4 (95.7)	33.2 (91.8)	29.6 (85.3)	25.4 (77.7)	30.4 (86.7)
Daily mean °C (°F)	20.5 (68.9)	21.0 (69.8)	22.9 (73.2)	26.0 (78.8)	29.5 (85.1)	31.6 (88.9)	33.5 (92.3)	33.7 (92.7)	32.3 (90.1)	30.0 (86.0)	26.6 (79.9)	22.7 (72.9)	27.5 (81.6)
Mean daily minimum °C (°F)	18.0 (64.4)	18.5 (65.3)	20.3 (68.5)	23.1 (73.6)	26.5 (79.7)	28.8 (83.8)	30.6 (87.1)	30.8 (87.4)	29.2 (84.6)	26.8 (80.2)	23.7 (74.7)	20.0 (68.0)	24.7 (76.4)
Record low °C (°F)	11.0 (51.8)	8.0 (46.4)	11.6 (52.9)	15.8 (60.4)	19.2 (66.6)	23.4 (74.1)	26.2 (79.2)	26.8 (80.2)	24.0 (75.2)	19.0 (66.2)	17.0 (62.6)	11.0 (51.8)	8.0 (46.4)
Average precipitation mm (inches)	30.0 (1.18)	20.1 (0.79)	28.1 (1.11)	6.8 (0.27)	0.0 (0.0)	0.0 (0.0)	0.2 (0.01)	0.0 (0.0)	0.0 (0.0)	1.6 (0.06)	5.8 (0.23)	33.7 (1.33)	126.3 (4.98)
Average precipitation days (≥ 1.0 mm)	2.4	1.9	2.3	0.7	0.0	0.0	0.0	0.0	0.0	0.1	0.8	2.8	11.0
Average relative humidity (%)	61	66	69	71	72	74	71	70	69	65	60	62	68
Mean monthly sunshine hours	227.4	225.9	231.6	267.4	312.4	315.8	284.7	294.5	280.5	293.9	263.4	228.9	3,226.4
Source: Iran Meteorological Organization (records), (temperatures), (precipitation), (humidity), (days with precipitation), (sunshine)

== See also ==
- Iran–United Arab Emirates relations
- Seizure of Abu Musa and the Greater and Lesser Tunbs
- Sir Abu Nu'ayr
- List of lighthouses in Iran
- List of islands of Iran

== Sources ==
- Haghshenas, Seyeed Ali, Iran Historical Sovereignty over the Tunbs and BuMusa Islands. 2010, Tehran.
- Vosoughi, Mohammad Bagher; Hirtenstein, Stephen (2015). "Abū Mūsā (Island)". In Madelung, Wilferd; Daftary, Farhad (eds.). Encyclopaedia Islamica Online. Brill Online. ISSN 1875-9831.
