= Khalid bin Muhammad Al Qasimi =

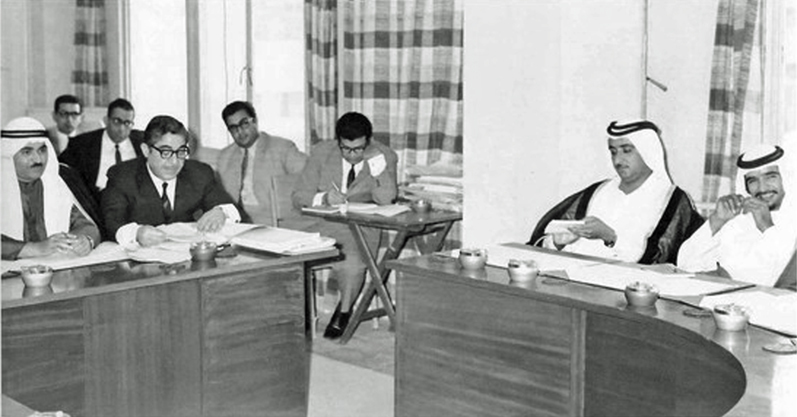
- Sheikh Khalid (extreme left) at TSC meeting, 1969

Ruler of Sharjah
- Reign: 24 June 1965 – 25 January 1972
- Predecessor: Saqr bin Sultan Al Qasimi
- Successor: Sultan bin Muhammad Al-Qasimi
- Born: 1931; Sharjah, Trucial States
- Died: 25 January 1972 (aged 40–41); Sharjah, United Arab Emirates
- House: Al Qasimi
- Father: Mohammed bin Saqr bin Khalid Al Qasimi

Sheikh Khalid bin Mohammed Al Qasimi (1931 – 25 January 1972) was an Emirati politician, and a founding father of the United Arab Emirates who served as the 9th ruler of the Emirate of Sharjah, from 1965 until his assassination in an abortive coup mounted by former ruler of Sharjah, Saqr bin Sultan Al Qasimi in February 1972.

== Biography ==
Sheikh Khalid was born in Sharjah in 1931. He acceded as ruler of Sharjah following the exile of his Arab nationalist cousin, Sheikh Saqr bin Sultan Al Qasimi, who was removed as ruler of Sharjah with the unanimous consent of the ruling family, under pressure from the British. His status as ruler was confirmed by William Luce, the British Political Resident of the Persian Gulf, on 25 June 1965.

A quiet and unassuming man, Khalid first established a formal police force in Sharjah and was also to play a key role as a participant in the negotiations and agreements which gave rise to the foundation of the United Arab Emirates on 2 December 1971, becoming a founding father of the nation.

He was also responsible for the demolition of Sharjah Fort, in an attempt to extirpate the memory of Saqr. The demolition was interrupted by his brother, Sultan bin Muhammad Al-Qasimi, who saved many of the fixtures and made drawings of the building. Arriving too late to save most of the fort, he nevertheless persuaded his brother to cease the demolition. All that remained was a single tower, Al Qubs - also called the 'Bourj', and one length of wall, as well as a number of the windows and doors from the old fort. Sultan had a precise plan drawn from the remaining foundations and, some twenty years later, Sheikh Sultan had the fort completely - and faithfully - restored.

On 24 January 1972, Saqr returned to Sharjah from Egypt, where he had been exiled, with a number of mercenaries and seized power in an attempted coup. The group invaded the Ruler's palace at approximately 2:30 PM, with reports of gunfire and grenade explosions within the palace grounds. Besieged by the Union Defence Force, which arrived an hour later, Saqr finally gave himself up in the early hours of 25 January to UAE Minister of Defence, Sheikh Mohammed bin Rashid Al Maktoum. However, Sheikh Khalid was killed in the action.

Sheikh Khalid was succeeded as Ruler of Sharjah by his brother, Sheikh Dr Sultan bin Muhammad Al Qasimi.

== Family ==
=== Children ===
He had four children:

- Dr. Faisal Bin Khalid Al Qasimi, Former Minister of Youth and Sports and Chairman of Gulf Medical Projects Company
- Mohammed Bin Khalid Al Qasimi, President of the Table Tennis Union and who died accidentally in April 1996;
- Sultan Bin Khalid Al Qasimi.
- Ahmed Bin Khalid Al Qasimi, who died with his father in the coup.
