= Abumusa County =

County in Hormozgan province, Iran

Abumusa County Persian: شهرستان بوموسی
- County
- Location of Bumusa County (bottom left, pink) in Hormozgan province

- Location of Hormozgan province in Iran
- Coordinates: 26°08′30″N 54°45′30″E
- Country: Iran
- Province: Hormozgan
- Capital: Abu Musa
- Districts: Central, Tunb

Population (2016)
  - Total: 7,402
- Time zone: UTC+3:30 (IRST)

Bumusa County (Persian: شهرستان بوموسی) is in Hormozgan province, Iran. It consists of six islands in the Persian Gulf: Abu Musa, Sirri Island, the Greater and Lesser Tunbs, Faror Island and Little Faror. Its capital is the city of Abu Musa.

== History ==
After the 2006 National Census, Sirri Rural District was created in the Central District. After the 2016 census, the village of Tunb-e Bozorg was elevated to the status of a city.

== Demographics ==
=== Population ===
At the time of the 2006 census, the county's population was 1,860 in 505 households. The following census in 2011 counted 5,263 people in 679 households. The 2016 census measured the population of the county as 7,402 in 924 households.

=== Administrative divisions ===
Bumusa County's population history and administrative structure over three consecutive censuses are shown in the following table.

Bumusa County Population
Administrative Divisions	2006	2011	2016
Central District	1,705	4,765	6,254
Sirri Rural District		1,304	2,041
Abu Musa (city)	1,705	3,461	4,213
Tunb District	155	498	1,148
Tunb Rural District	155	498	1,148
Tunb-e Bozorg (city) (Note: Became a city after the 2016 census.)			
Total	1,860	5,263	7,402
