= University of Tehran =

Public collegiate university in Tehran, Iran

- دانشگاه تهران
- Coat of arms of the University of Tehran
- Motto: میاسای زآموختن یک زمان
- Motto in English: Waste not a moment of learning
- Type: Public collegiate research university
- Established: 1851 (Dar ul-Funun) 1899 (Tehran School of Political Sciences) 1934; 92 years ago (Modern University)
- Founders: Reza Shah; Isa Sedigh
- Affiliations: Islamic World Educational, Scientific and Cultural Organization
- Endowment: 33,109,412 million rials (national budget, 2023-24)
- President: Mohammad Hossein Omid
- Faculty: ~2,000 (full-time) (2023)
- Administrative staff: ~3,500 (full-time) (2023)
- Students: ~41,000 (2023)
- Undergraduates: ~20,000 (2023)
- Postgraduates: ~21,000 (2023)
- Location: Tehran, Iran; 35.70411°N 51.39513°E
- Campus: Urban (Main Campus)
- Language: Persian / English
- Colors: Cyan
- Website: ut.ac.ir

The University of Tehran (UT) (Persian: دانشگاه تهران, Dâneshgâh-e Tehrân) is a public collegiate university in Iran, and the oldest and most prominent Iranian university located in Tehran. Based on its historical, socio-cultural, and political pedigree, as well as its research and teaching profile, UT has been nicknamed " The Mother University" (دانشگاه مادر, Dâneshgâh-e mâdar), which means flagship university. It is also the premier knowledge-producing institute among all OIC countries. The university offers more than 111 bachelor's degree programs, 177 master's degree programs, and 156 PhD programs. Many of the departments were absorbed into the University of Tehran from the Dar al-Funun established in 1851, and the Tehran School of Political Sciences established in 1899.

The main campus of the university is located in the central part of the city. However, other campuses are spread across the city as well as in the suburbs, such as the Baghe Negarestan Campus in the central eastern part of the city, the Northern Amirabad Campuses in the central western part of the city, and the Abureyhan Campus in the suburb of the capital. The main gate of the university, with its specific design and modern architecture (at Enghelab Street at the main campus), is the logo of the university.

Admission to the university's undergraduate and graduate programs is limited to the top one percent of students who pass the national entrance examination administered yearly by the Ministry of Science, Research and Technology.

== History ==
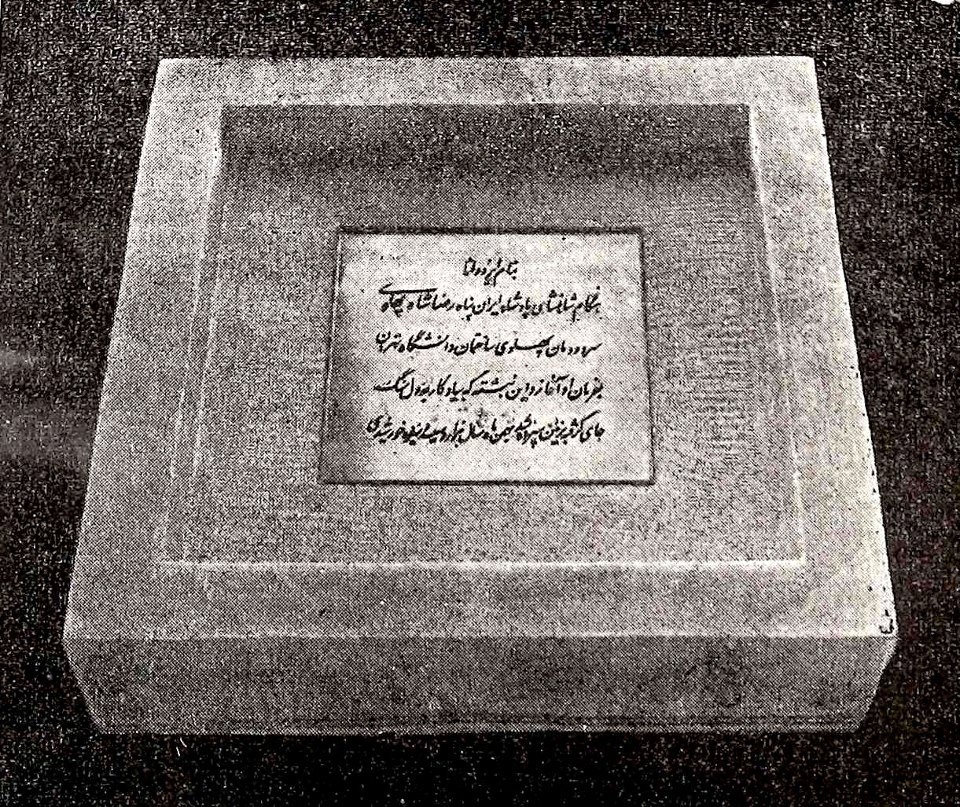
Opening stone of University of Tehran (1934)

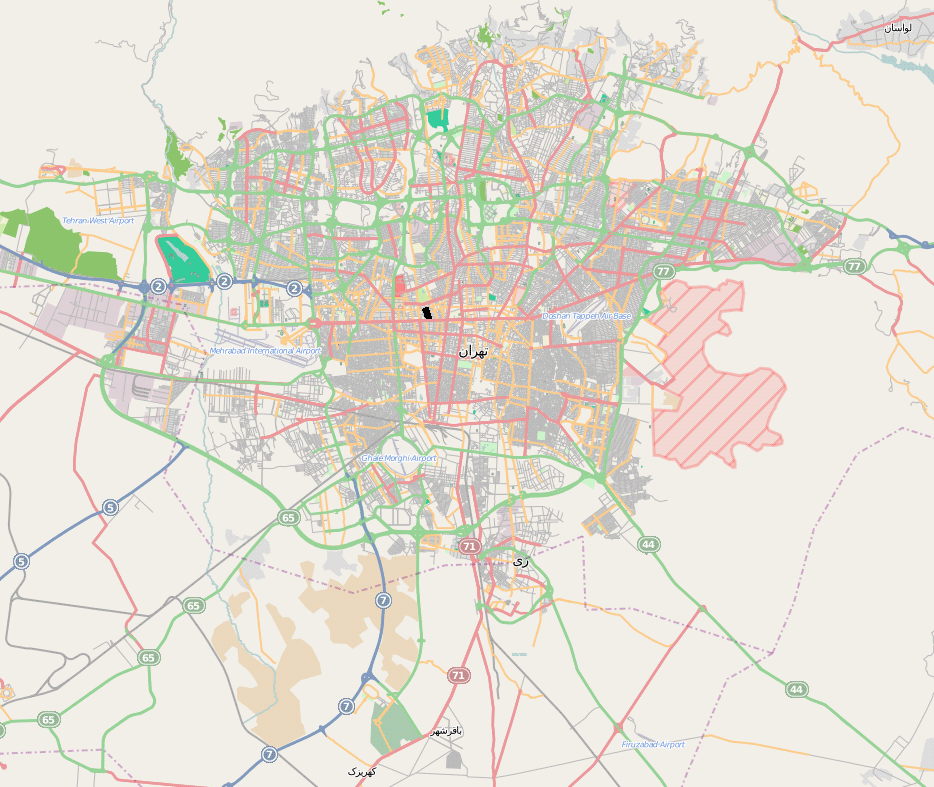
University of Tehran in Tehran map (in black)

The first official step for the establishment of the present form of University of Tehran in Iran occurred on 31 March 1931 when Minister of Court Abdolhossein Teymourtash wrote Isa Sedigh who was completing his doctoral dissertation at Columbia University in New York to inquire as to requirements for the establishment of a university in Tehran. Isa Sedigh regarded the letter as an invitation to outline a comprehensive scheme for the establishment of a new university.

In 1933, during the cabinet meeting, the subject was brought up. Ali Asghar Hekmat, the acting minister of the Ministry of Education stated the following words there: "Of course, there is no doubt on the thriving state and the glory of the capital, but the only obvious deficiency is that this city has no 'university'. It is a pity that this city lags far behind other great countries of the world." His words had a profound impact on everyone in the meeting, resulting in the acceptance of the proposal. Thus, allocating an initial budget of 250,000 Tomans, the Ministry of Education was authorized to find a suitable land for the establishment of the university and take necessary measures to construct the building as soon as possible. Ali Asghar Hekmat, in collaboration and consultation with André Godard, a French architect – who was serving the Ministry of Education as an engineer, began looking for a location for the university grounds. By the orders of Rezā Shāh, the compound of Jalaliyeh garden was selected. Jalaliyeh garden was located in the north of the then Tehran between Amirabad village and the northern trench of Tehran. This garden was founded in the early 1900s during the final years of Nasir ad- Din Shah, by the order of Prince Jalal ad-dawlah. The master plan of the campus buildings was drawn up by French architects Roland Dubrulle and Maxime Siroux, Swiss architect Alexandre Moser, as well as Andre Godard, Nicolai Markov and Mohsen Foroughi. The University of Tehran officially inaugurated in 1934. The Amir-abad (North Karegar) campus was added in 1945 after American troops left the property as World War II was coming to an end. The university admitted women as students for the first time in 1937.

In 1935, the formerly males-only university opened its doors to women as part of the country's sweeping universal education policy.

UT played a central role in the overthrow of the Pahlavi government in the 1978-9 revolution. University curricula, staff, and student intake were subject to major revisions in the early 1980s, as part of Iran's Cultural Revolution. UT continues to constitute a central part of Iran's student movement.

In 1986, the Iranian parliament, known as the Majlis of Iran, stipulated that the university's overcrowded College of Medicine be separated into the independent Tehran University of Medical Sciences (TUMS), and that TUMS be placed under the leadership of the new ministry of health and Medical Education.

== Campuses, colleges and faculties ==
1. Regional Campuses:

- Aras International Campus
- Kish International Campus
- Alborz Campus

2. Colleges:

- College of Engineering
  - Schools & Faculties:
    - School of Electrical & Computer Engineering (A Prominent Lab: Energy Storage Laboratory (ESL))
    - School of Mechanical Engineering
    - School of Chemical Engineering
    - School of Metallurgy & Materials Engineering
    - School of Civil Engineering
    - School of Mining Engineering
    - School of Surveying and Geomatics Engineering
    - School of Industrial Engineering
    - School of Engineering Science
    - Fouman Faculty of Engineering in Fouman
    - Caspian Faculty of Engineering in Rezvanshahr
- College of Science
  - Schools:
    - School of Mathematics, Statistics and Computer Science
    - School of Geology
    - School of Biology
    - School of Chemistry
    - School of Physics
    - School of Biotechnology

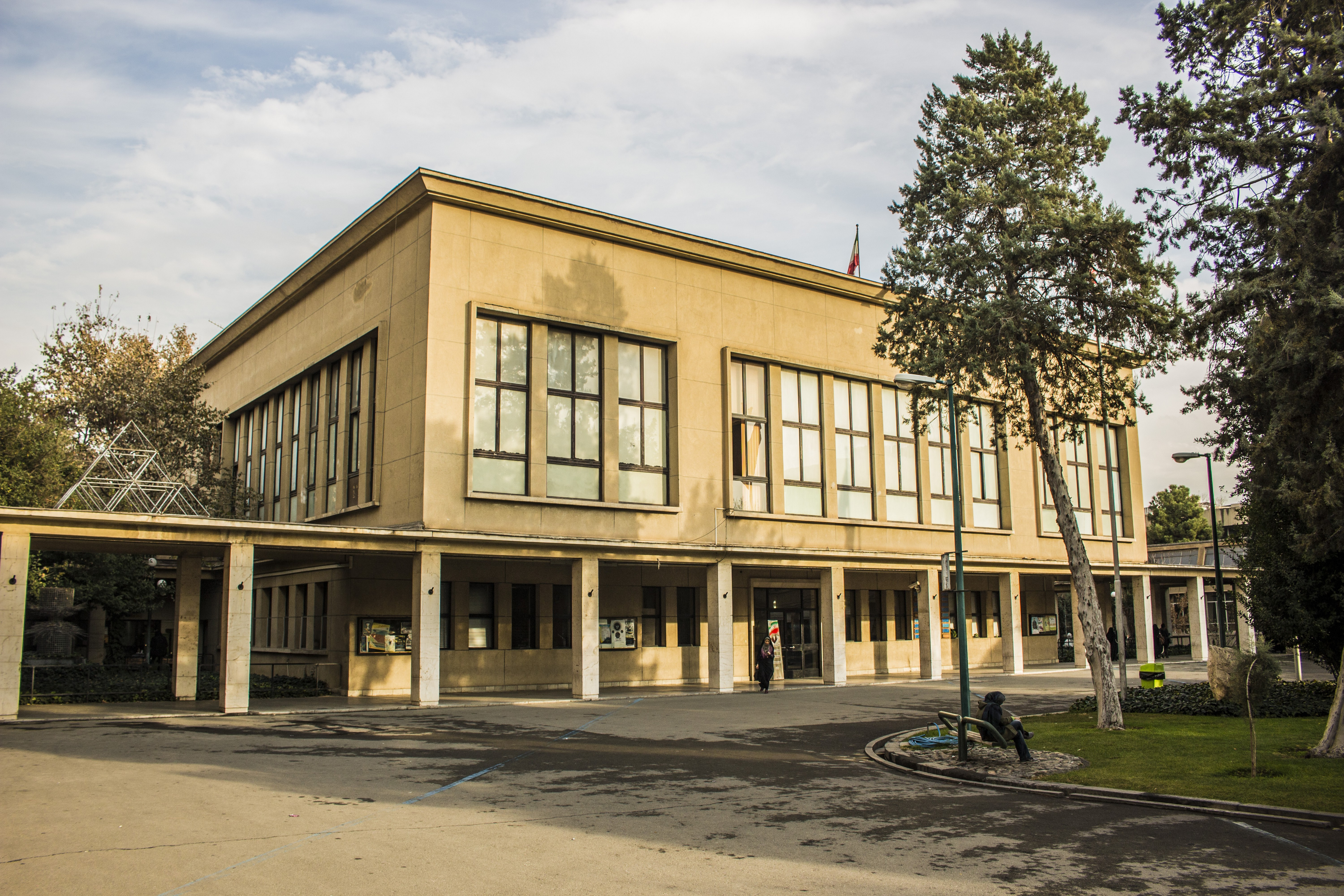
College of Fine Arts

- College of Fine Arts
- College of Agriculture & Natural Resources in Karaj and Pakdasht
- College of Farabi in Qom

3. Faculties

- Faculty of New Sciences and Technologies
- Faculty of Veterinary Medicine
- Faculty of Governance

Humanities Faculties:

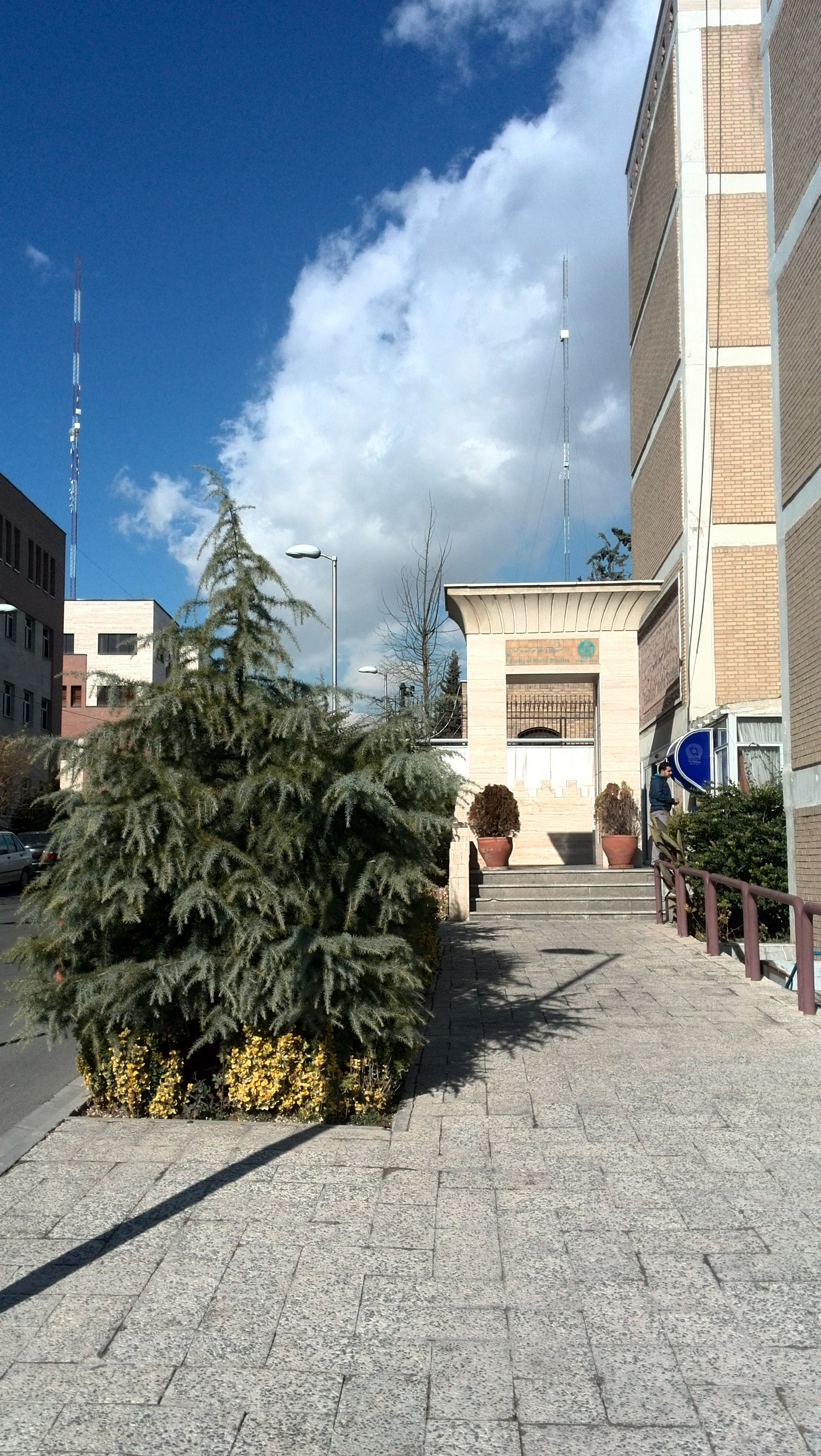
Faculty of World Studies

- Faculty of World Studies
- Faculty of Foreign Languages and Literature
- Faculty of Literature and Human Sciences
- Faculty of Law and Political Science
- Faculty of Theology and Islamic Studies
- Faculty of Thought and Islamic Sciences

Social and Behavioral Sciences Faculties:

- Faculty of Economics
- Faculty of Physical Education and Sport Sciences
- Faculty of Geography
- Faculty of Psychology and Education
- Faculty of Social Sciences
- Faculty of Entrepreneurship
- Faculty of Management

=== Academic institutes and centers ===
University of Tehran also co-ordinates several major institutes:

- Institute of Biochemistry and Biophysics
- Institute of Geophysics
- The International Research Center for Coexistence with Deserts
- Institute of History of Science
- Institute for North American and European Studies
- Institute of Electrotechnic
- Center for Women's Studies
- Applied Management Research Center
- Dehkhoda Dictionary Institute
- Vehicle, Fuel, and Environment Research Institute
- Turbo Machine Institute
- Institute of Petroleum Engineering
- Water Institute
- The Research Institute of Energy Planning and Management
- The Engineering Optimization Research Group
- Biomaterial Research Institute
- Advanced Material Research Institute
- Inorganic Material Research Institute
- University of Tehran Research Institute (UTRI)
- Science and Technology Park of University of Tehran
- International Desert Research Center (IDRC)
- Cyberspace Research Policy Center (CRPC)

== Research and facilities ==
The University of Tehran hosts cultural and academic activities on the national and international levels. Furthermore, UT hosts delegations and professors from abroad.

University of Tehran is appointed as the Center of Excellence (قطب علمی) by Iran's Ministry of Science and Technology in the fields of "Evaluation and improvement of irrigation networks", "Breeding and Biotechnology of trees", "Farming, Grading and Biotechnology", "Applied Electromagnetic Systems", "Land Logistics", "Sustainable Urban Planning and Development", "Architectural Technology", "Biological Control of Pests and Plant Diseases", "Rural Studies and Planning", "High-Performance Materials", "Control and Intelligent Processing", "Sustainable Management of Watershed", "Applied Management of Fast Growing Wood Species", "Surveying and Disaster Management", "Engineering and Infrastructure Management", "Oil and Gas". This appointment is based on national standing based on research achievements and invested funding in the mentioned topics. Fifteen percent of the country's Centers of Excellence, as recognized by the government, are located at the University of Tehran, which along with more than 40 research centers ensure UT's commitment to research. Together, over 3,500 laboratories are active in these centers and in the faculties. In addition, the University of Tehran publishes more than 50 scientific journals, some of which have the ISI index.

The Central Library and Documentation Center of the University of Tehran has been a member of the International Federation of Library Associations and institutions (IFLA) since 1967. The library complements the 35 specialized libraries based at different faculties, all with the aim of advancing the research goals of the university. Currently the Central Library and Documentation Center is offering its services to more than 65 thousand members. It hosts more than 5,000 users daily. The library offers its resources under 13 main collections (most of which have been donated by distinguished professors of the university). The manuscript collection of the University of Tehran includes over 17,000 volumes of manuscripts in Persian, Arabic and Turkish. The library also hosts a state of the art center for the preservation of manuscripts. The University of Tehran Press (UTP), which focuses on publishing academic books, has published over 5,000 books up until today, and currently publishes on average more than one book per day. UTP has over 96 distribution agents throughout the country as well as one in Afghanistan.

== Endowment ==
University of Tehran is a public university and its funding is provided by the government of Iran. For the top ranks of the national university entrance exam, education is free in all public universities. The people with ranks below the normal capacity of the universities will be required to pay part or all of the tuition. In 2011 University of Tehran with an amount equivalent to 70 million dollars got the highest budget among all universities in Iran.

== Emblems ==
The emblem of the University of Tehran is based on an image which can be found in the stucco relief and seals of the Sasanid period. It is a copy from a stucco relief discovered in the city of Ctesiphon. The seal symbolized ownership. In the Sassanid period, these seals were used in stucco reliefs, coins, and silver utensils as a family symbol. Since the alphabet of Sasanid Pahlavi's script was used in these badges, they have the nature of a monogram as well.

The motif is placed between two eagle wings. One can also find these motifs in other images of this period, such as in royal crowns, particularly at the end of the Sasanid period. Crowns with these seals have been called "two-feather crowns" in the Shahnameh. The motif between the wings was made by combining Pahlavi scripts. Some scholars have tried to read these images. The script is in the form of "Afzoot" (Amrood), which means plentiful and increasing.

== Colors ==
University of Tehran's official color is University of Tehran Blue (RGB: 29,160,196).

== Main entrance ==
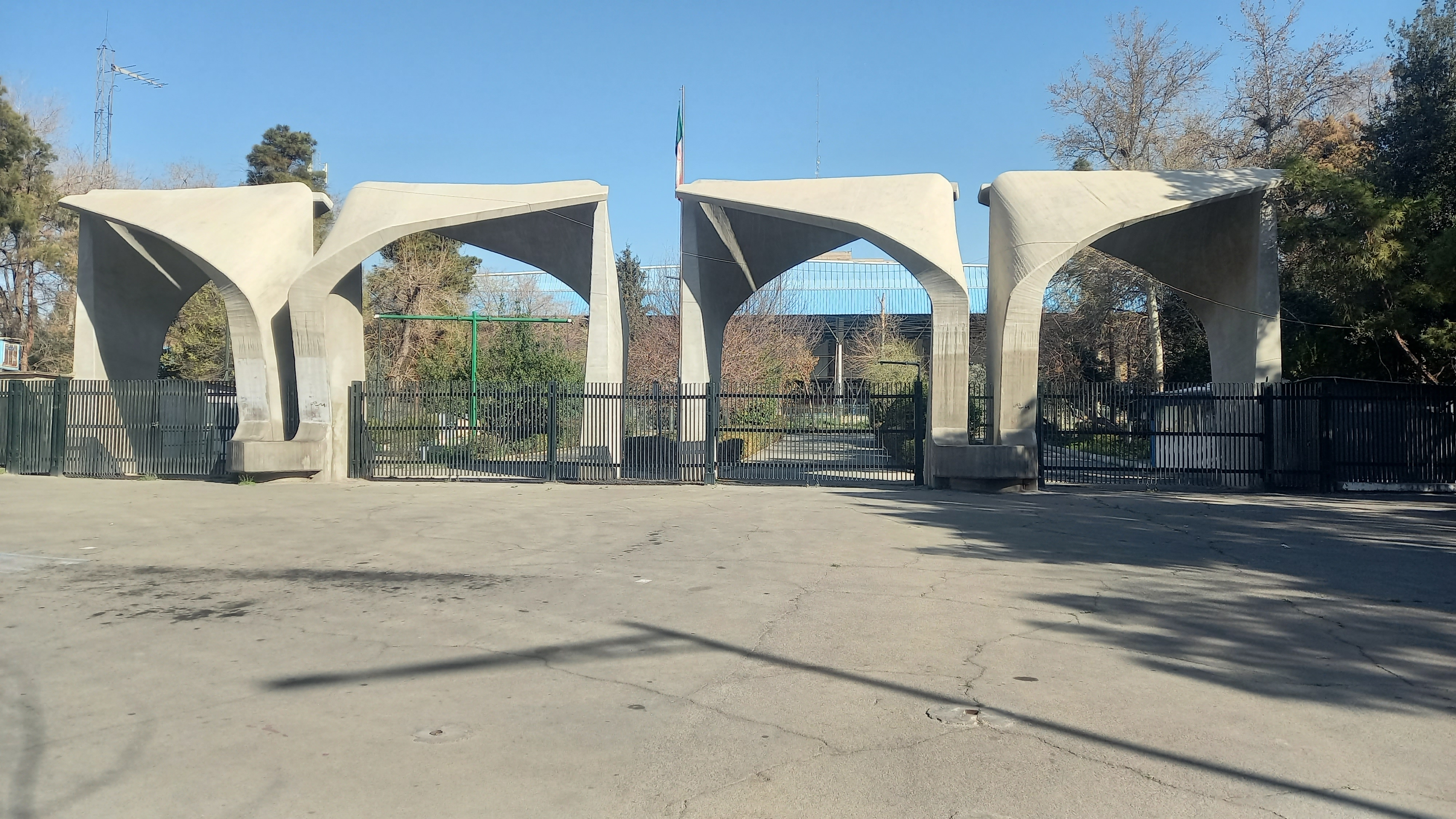
The main entrance of the University of Tehran on Enqelab Street, Tehran

The University of Tehran main entrance was designed in 1965 by Korosh Farzami, one of the students of the faculty of Fine Arts of the university and built by Arme Construction Company.

The gates are depicted on the reverse of the Iranian 50,000 rials banknote.

== Faculties History ==
Initially University of Tehran included eight colleges and faculties:

- College of farabi
- Faculty of Theology and Islamic Studies
- College of Science (1934)
- Faculty of Letters and Humanities
- Faculty of Medicine (1934)
- Faculty of Pharmacy (1934)
- Faculty of Dentistry (1939)
- College of Engineering (Fanni) (1942)
- Faculty of Law and Political Science (1942)

Later more faculties were founded:

- College of Fine Arts (1941)
- Faculty of Veterinary Medicine (1943)
- Faculty of Agriculture (1945)
- Faculty of Management (1954)
- Faculty of Education (1954)
- Faculty of Natural Resources (1963)
- Faculty of Economics (1970)
- Faculty of Social Sciences (~1972)
- Faculty of Environment (1975)
- Faculty of Foreign Languages (1989)
- Faculty of Physical education
- Faculty of Geography (~2002)
- Faculty of World Studies (~2007)
- Faculty of Entrepreneurship
- Faculty of New Sciences and Technologies (~2010)

In 1992, the faculties of Medicine, Dentistry and Pharmacology seceded to become the Tehran University of Medical Sciences but is still located at the main campus (The central Pardis). The Central Pardis Campus, on Enghelab Ave, is the oldest and best known of the campuses. Amir Abad Campus is where most of the dormitories are located. Aside from physical campuses, University of Tehran also has an online campus program first started in 2003 under a project to provide online degree programs, becoming the first university in Iran to host events in regards to the development of formal national ICT.

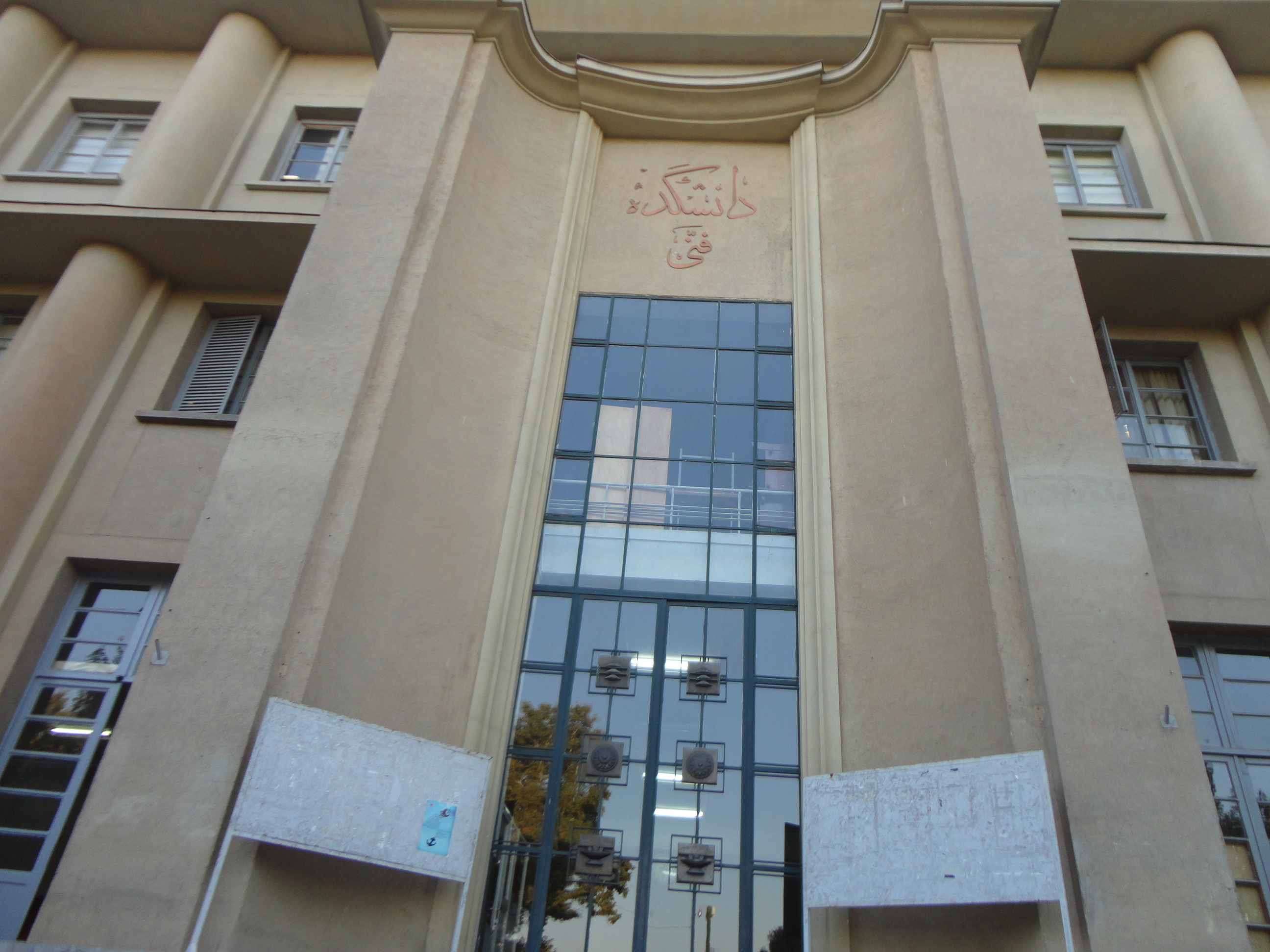
School of Engineering Main Building known as Faculty of Engineering Building

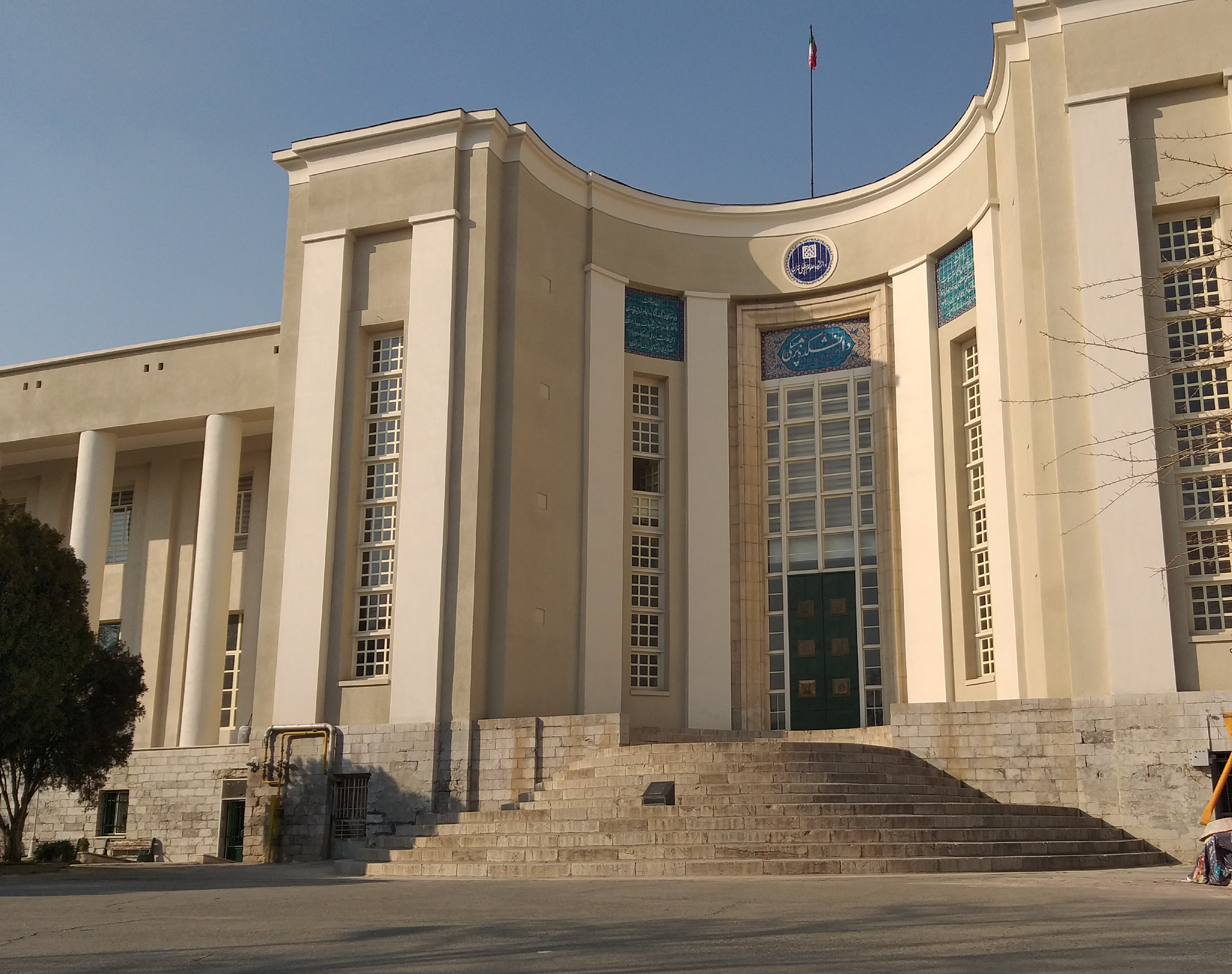
School of Medicine

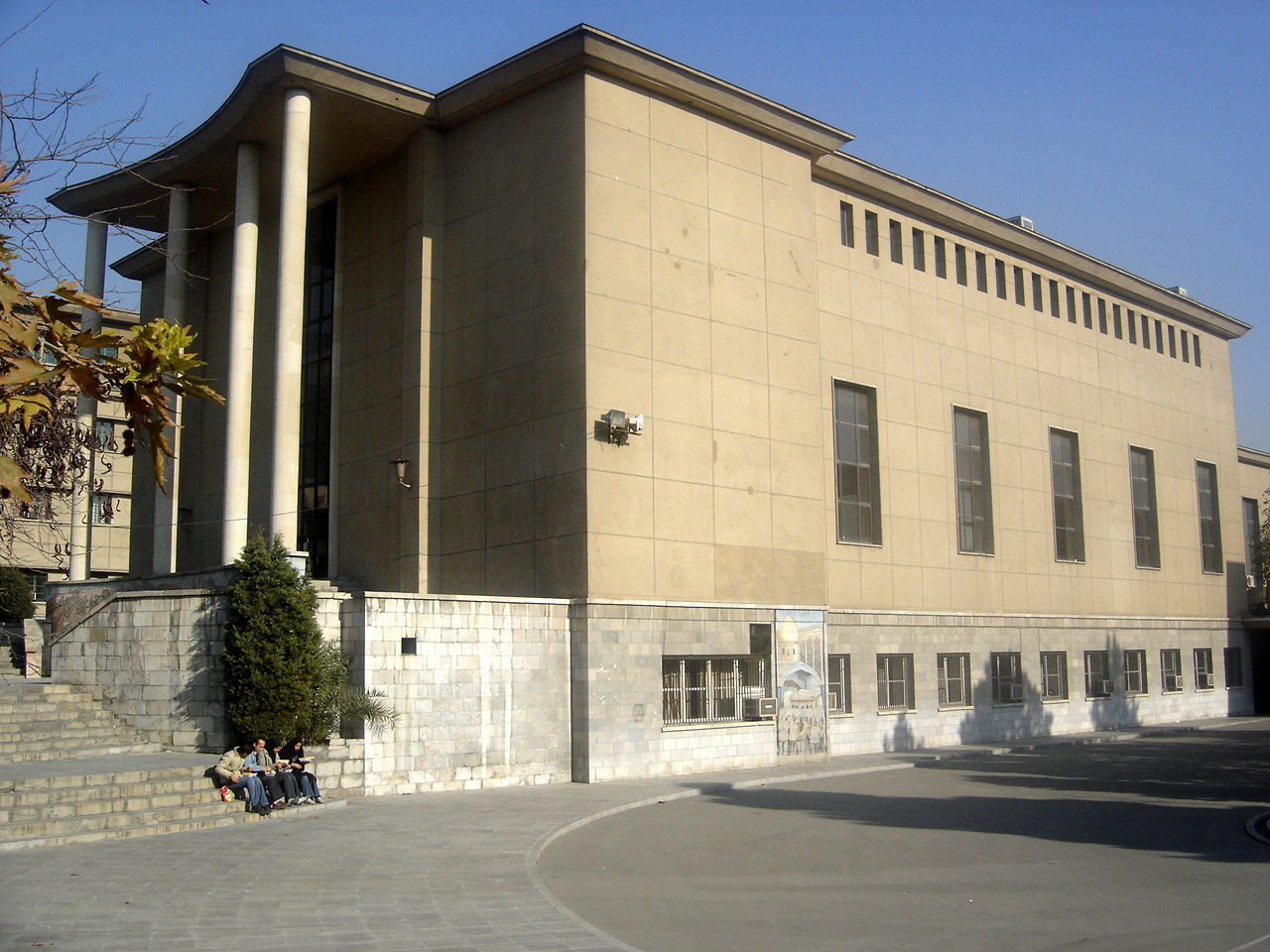
School of Fine Arts

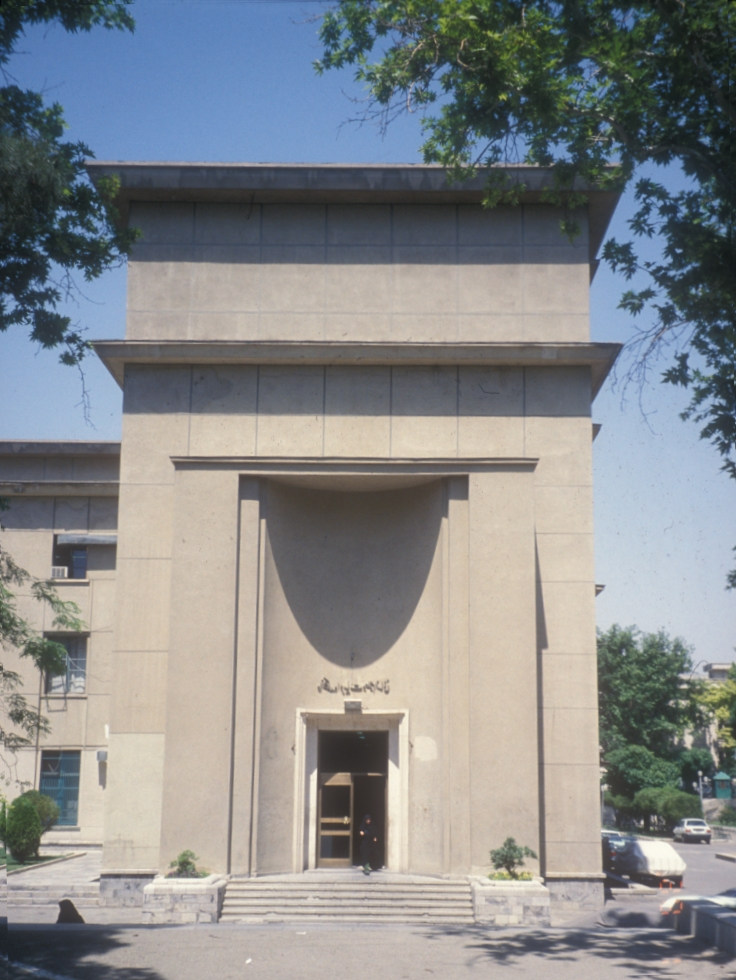
Faculty of Letters and Humanities of the University of Tehran

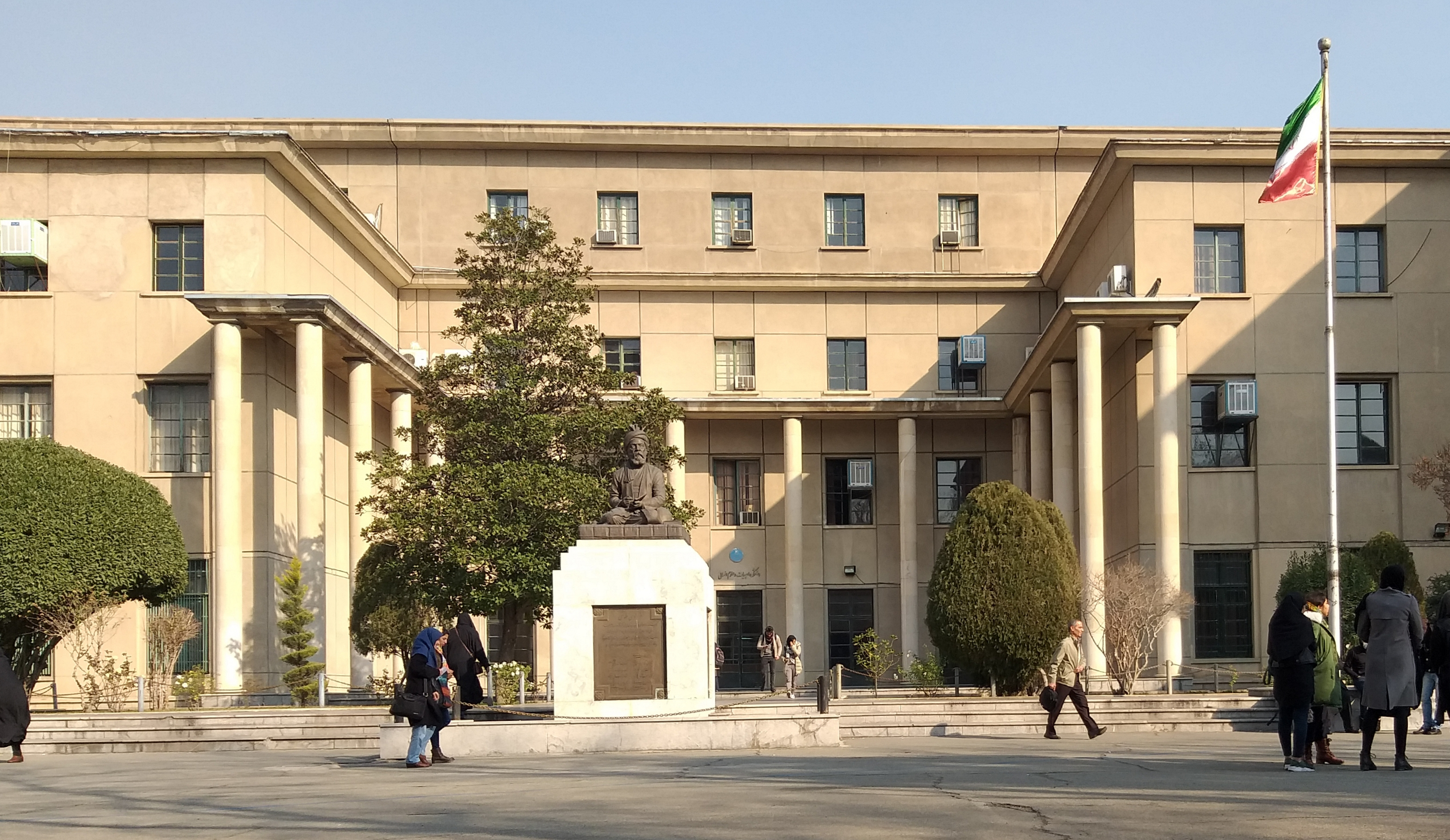
Faculty of Letters and Humanities

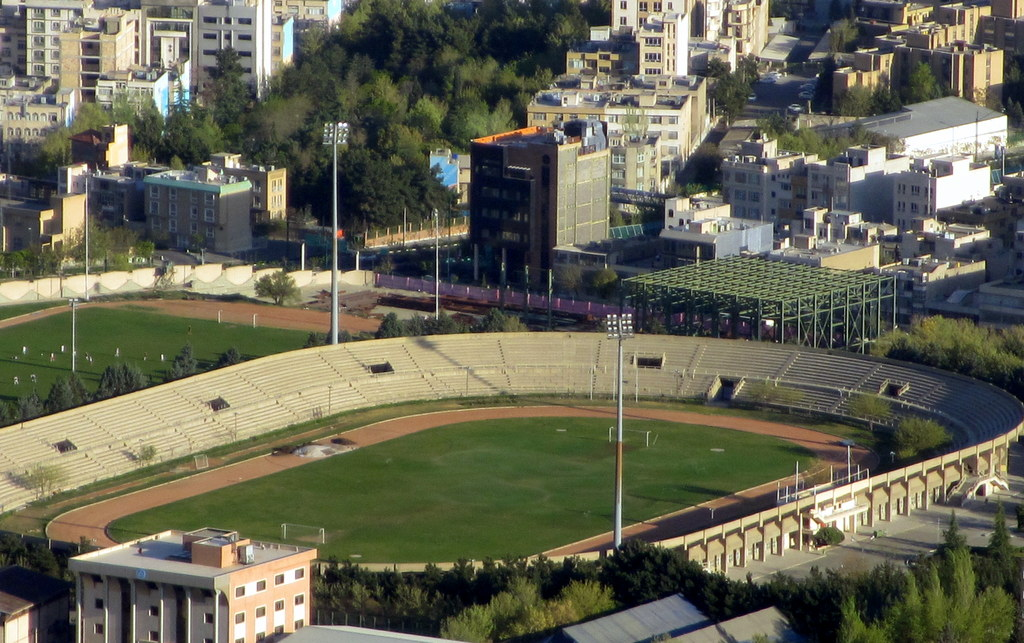
The stadium of University of Tehran

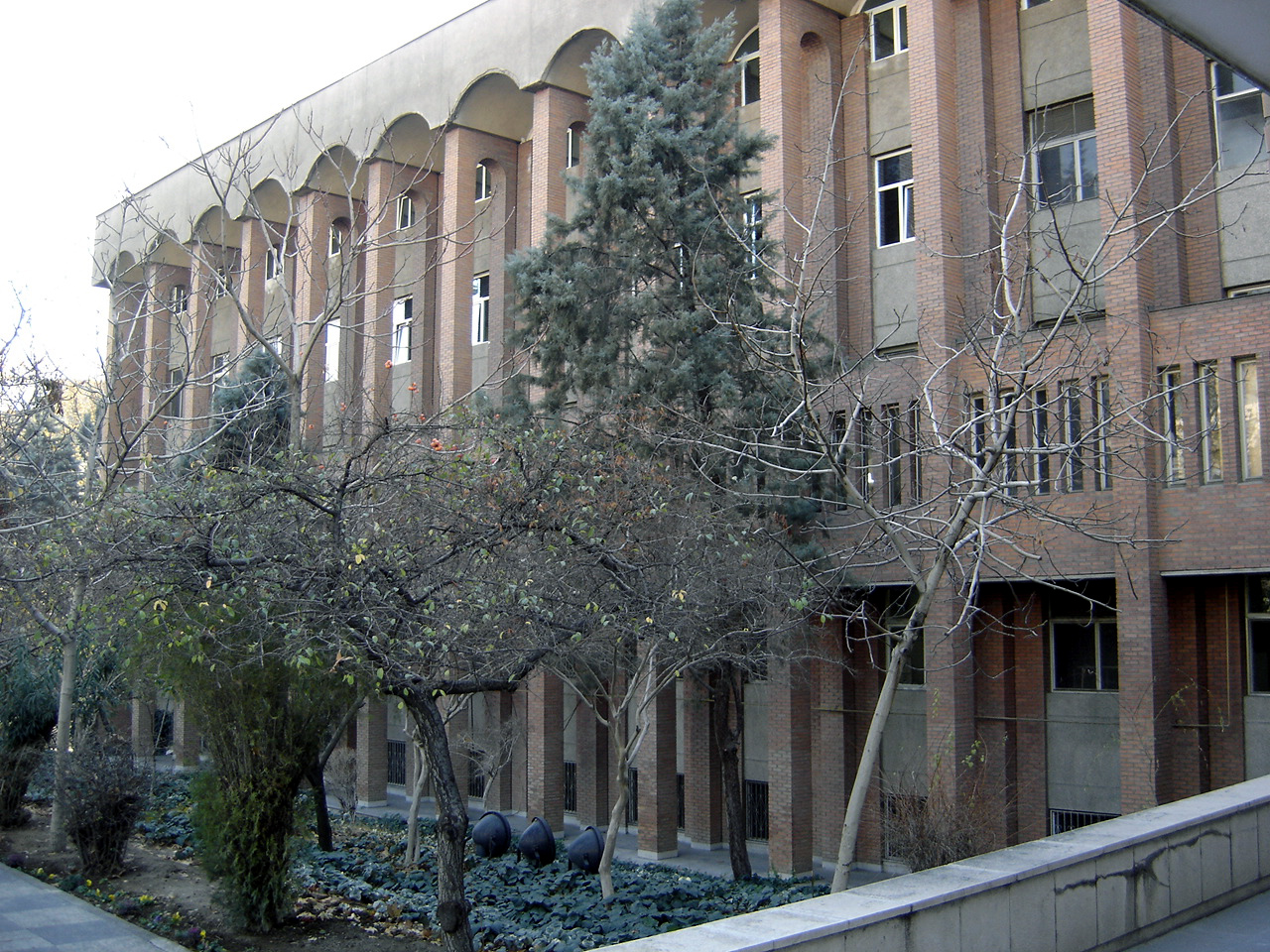
School of Economics Building

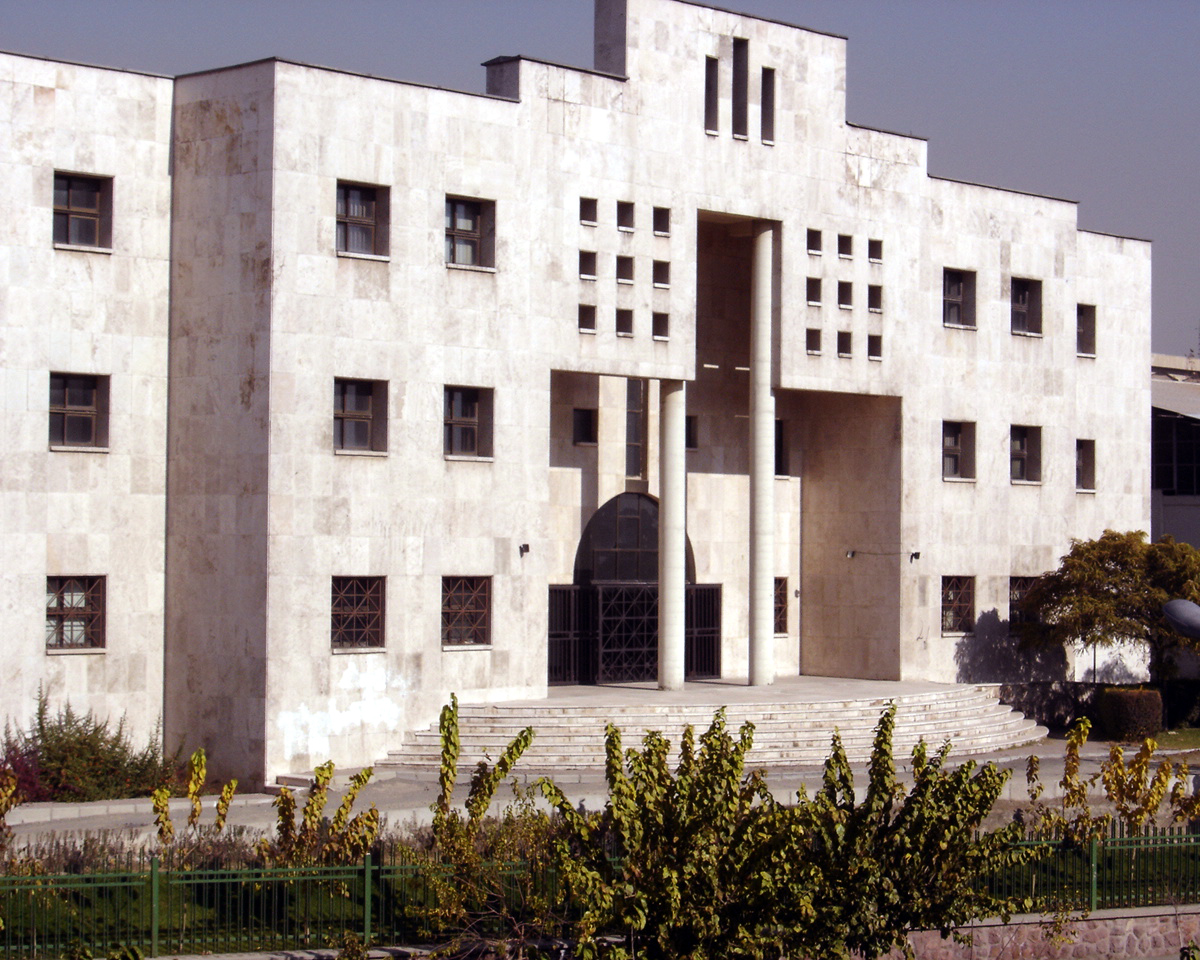
The new School of Engineering state-of-the-art buildings in Amir Abad campus

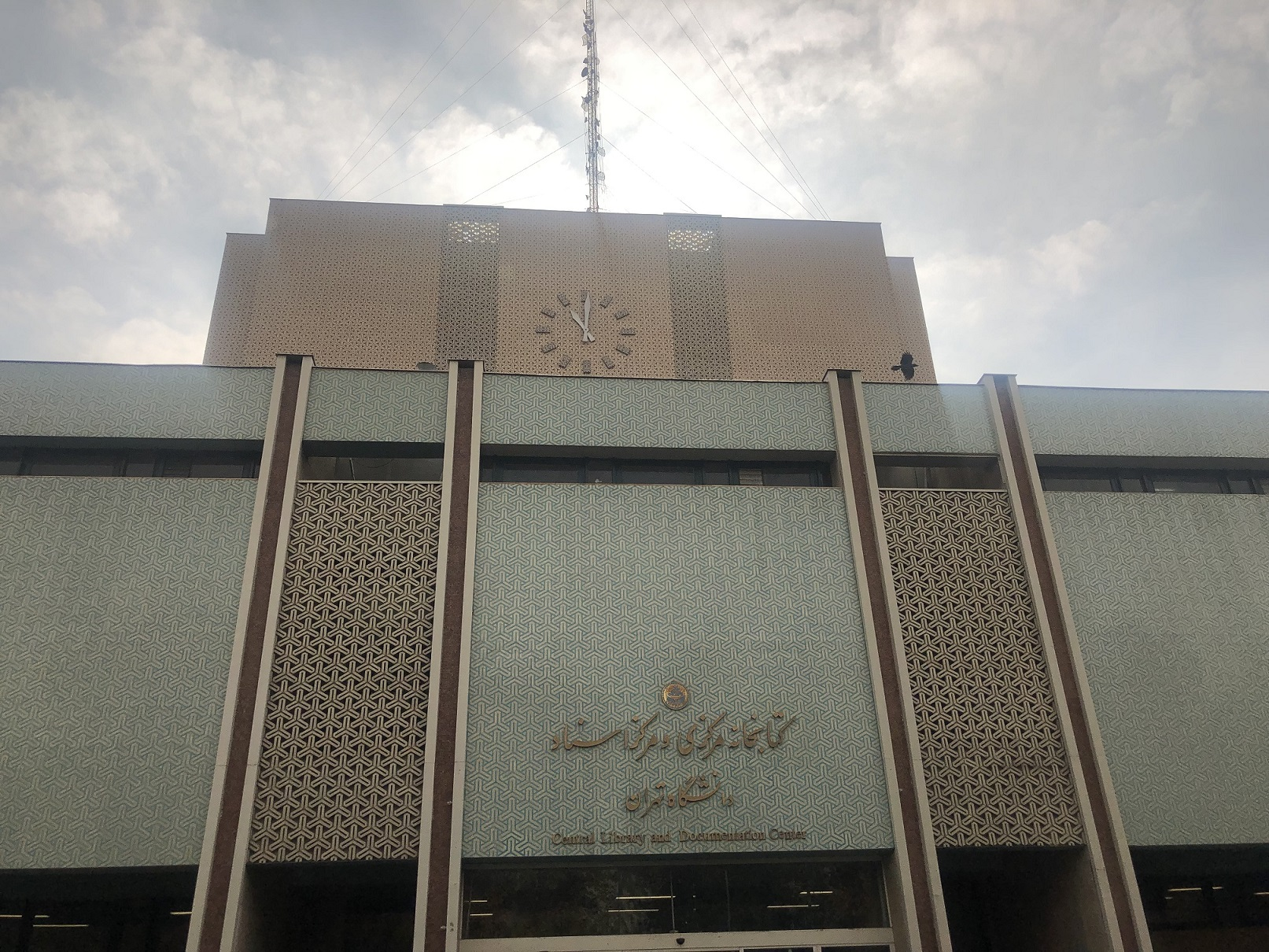
Main Library

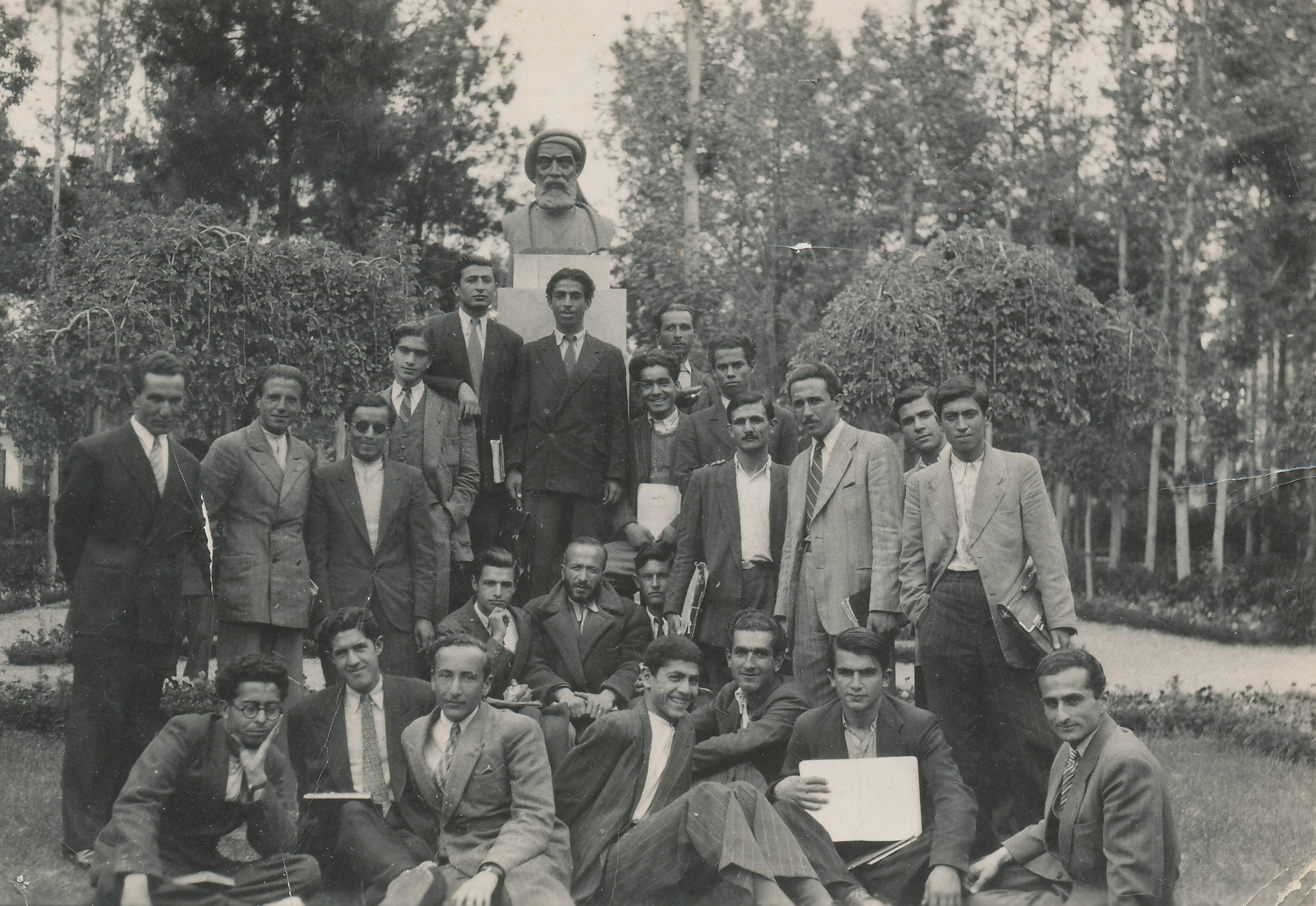
A group of students from the Faculty of Science, University of Tehran in 1946

== World rankings ==
University rankings

Global – Overall
- ARWU World: 401–500 (2023)
- CWTS World: 142 (2022)
- QS World: 322 (2026)
- THE World: 401–500 (2024)
- USNWR Global: 329 (2023)

U.S. News & World Report 2018 Best Global Universities

- Engineering: 42

2022 Best Global Universities: #329

- Engineering: 22

Academic Ranking of World Universities

2019: 301-400

2018: 301-400

2017: 301-400

2016: 301-400

2015: 201-300

Times Higher Education
2016–2019: 601–800

U.S. News & World Report

2017 Best Global Universities Ranking

- Engineering: 45
- Agricultural Sciences: 71
- Computer science: 120
- Materials Science: 117
- Chemistry: 235
- Biology, Biochemistry: 307

== Libraries and museums ==
As the largest academic library in Iran, the Central Library and Documentation Center of the University of Tehran includes a selection of resources in different fields of science, technology, and literature. The library holdings include over one million books, periodicals, manuscripts, microfilms, pictorial copies, historical documents and photos, lithography books, academic dissertations, scientific documents and maps, over 120,000 books in English, French, German, Russian, Italian, and other language.

== Political role ==
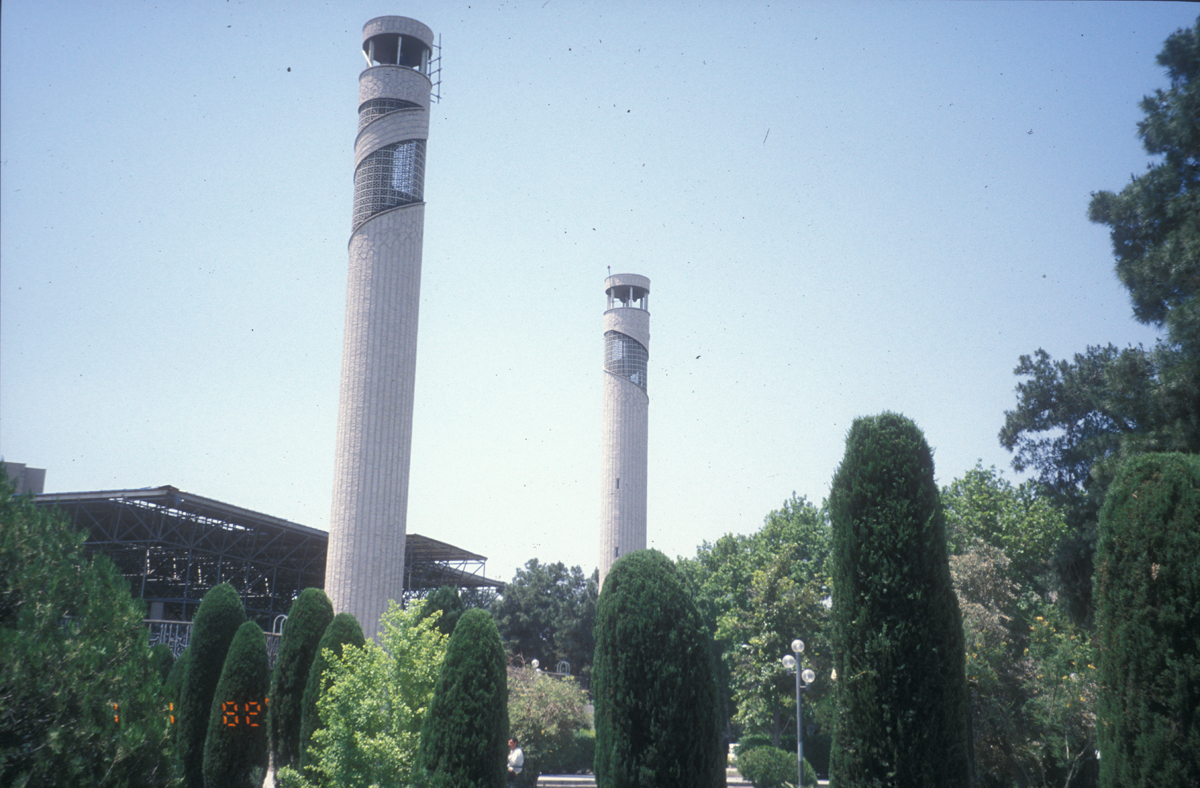
UT's central mosque has been a center for religious and political activity in Tehran during the past 30 years

University of Tehran's central place in Iranian elite circles has made it the setting for many political events and cultural works. It was in front of the gates of this school that The Shah's army opened fire on dissident students, killing many and further triggering the 1979 revolution of Iran. It was there and 20 years later in July 1999 that, albeit, a much smaller number of dissident students confronted the police. University of Tehran (UT) has always been a bastion of political movement and ideology. Since the 1979 Islamic Revolution, the main campus of the university and its surrounding streets have been the site for Tehran's Friday prayers.

The political and social role of the University of Tehran in the Iranian domestic arena has continued to be so pronounced that in November 2005 (to February 2008) a senior Islamic scholar became chancellor (president) of the university, replacing Faraji-dana (professor of electrical engineering faculty). Ayatollah Abbasali Amid Zanjani (عباسعلی عميد زنجانی) is a professor in law, is known for his strong ties to Ayatollah Khomeini in the 1979 revolution, and had spent time in the Shah's prisons before the Islamic Revolution. In February 2008, an economist, Farhad Rahbar, a former vice president of Iran and head of Management and Planning Organization of Iran, became the new (31st) chancellor of the university.

One hundred and nineteen faculty members of the University of Tehran resigned on 15 June 2009 to protest the attack on university dorms in the wake of contested 2009 presidential elections: although clear follow-up data is hard to establish, it seems that most or all resignations were not accepted.

== Notable people ==
Politicians

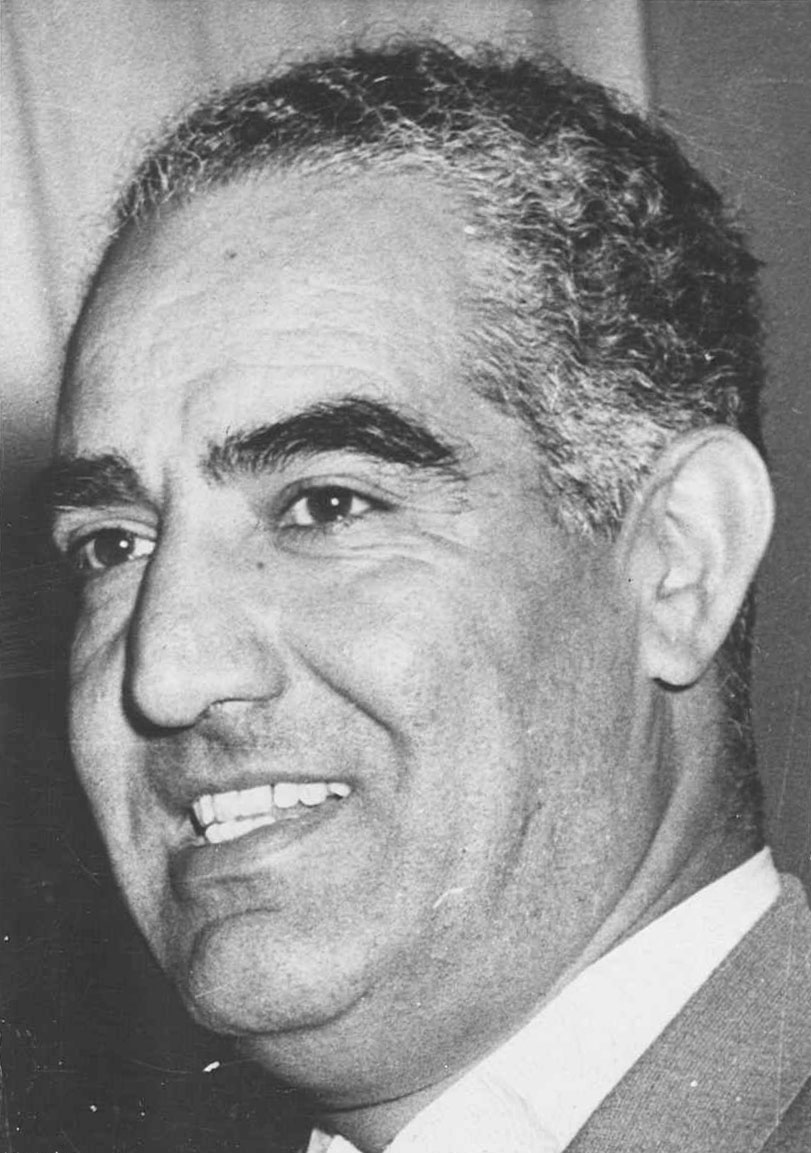
Manouchehr Eghbal

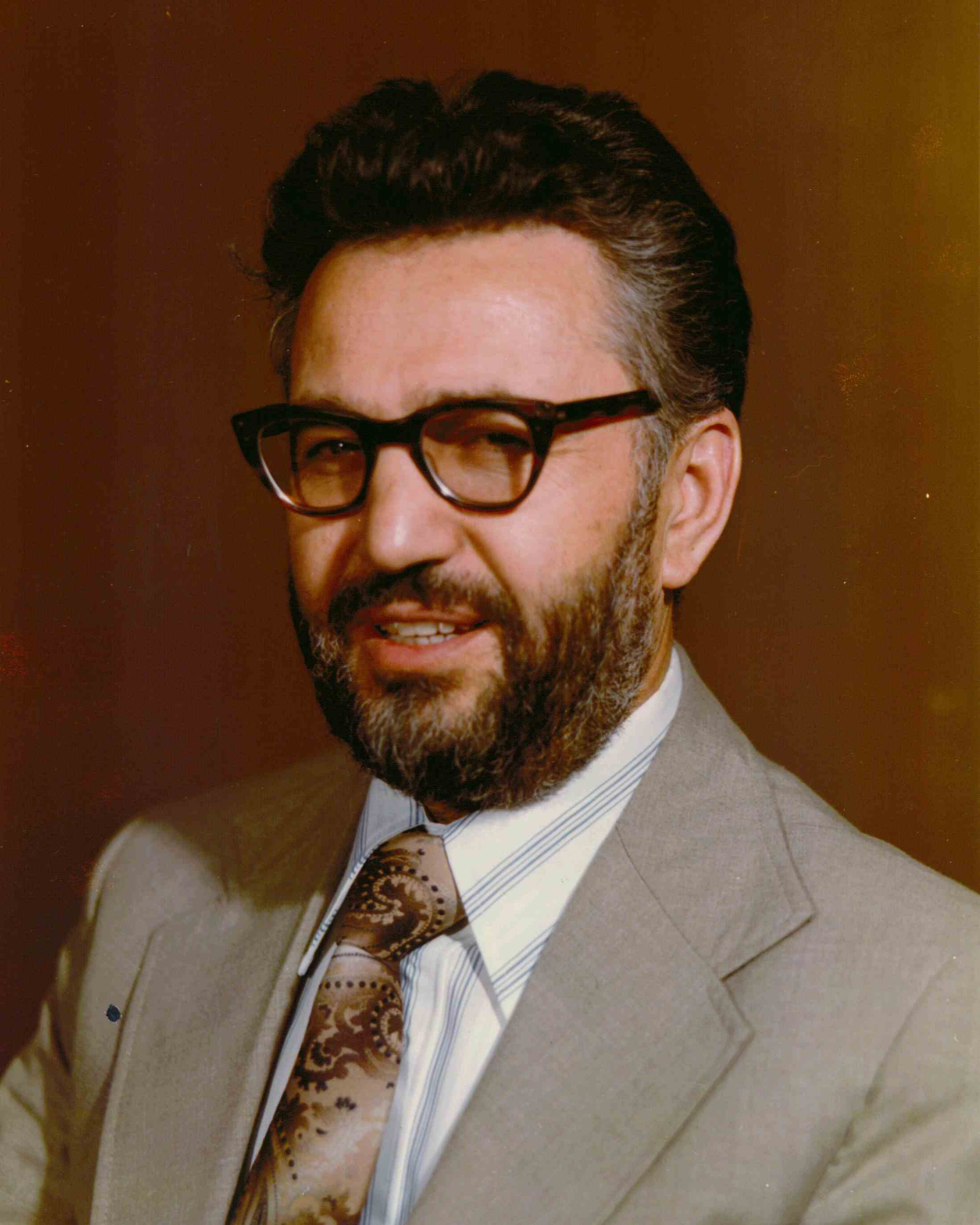
Ebrahim Yazdi

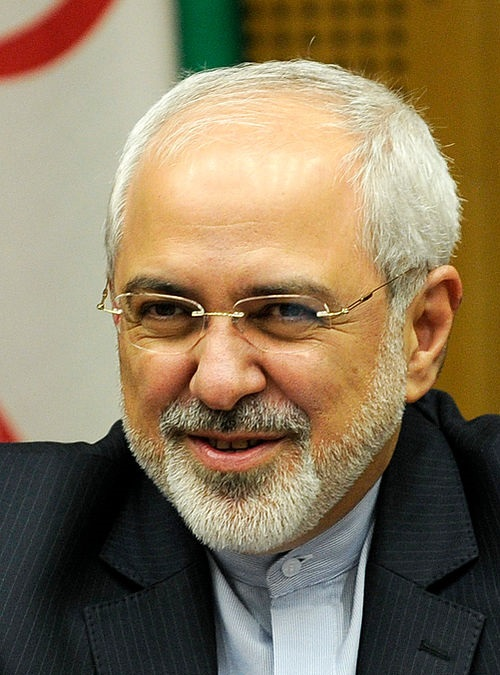
Mohammad Javad Zarif

Many of the most important figures in Iranian political, academic, and social life have been associated with the University of Tehran. Notable press alumnus include Hossein Towfigh, Editor-in-Chief of Towfigh Magazine. Politicians include the nationalist leader Mohammad Mosaddegh, Ayatollah Mohammad Beheshti, former prime minister Jamshid Amouzegar, and the recent reformist President Mohammad Khatami.

Academics include Lotfi A. Zadeh the inventor of fuzzy logic, Fields Medal winner Caucher Birkar, Ali Javan who invented the gas laser, intellectual and former prime minister Mehdi Bazargan and biophysicist Mohammad-Nabi Sarbolouki.

Art figures include filmmakers Abbas Kiarostami and Asghar Farhadi, actor Khosrow Shakibai and poet Mohammad-Taqi Bahar.

Other notable figures include Human Rights Lawyer Shirin Ebadi who won the Nobel Peace Prize in 2003, pioneering architect Heydar Ghiai, prominent philosopher Hossein Nasr, reformist cleric Mehdi Karroubi, environmental activist Mahlagha Mallah.

Alumni from the University of Tehran's predecessor institutions the Dar ul-Funun and the Tehran School of Political Sciences include linguist Ali-Akbar Dehkhoda, Baháʼí scholar Mírzá Abu'l-Fadl and former prime ministers Mohammad-Ali Foroughi and Ali Amini.

The School of Engineering at the University of Tehran has introduced recognized researchers all over the world, including:

Scientists and technologists

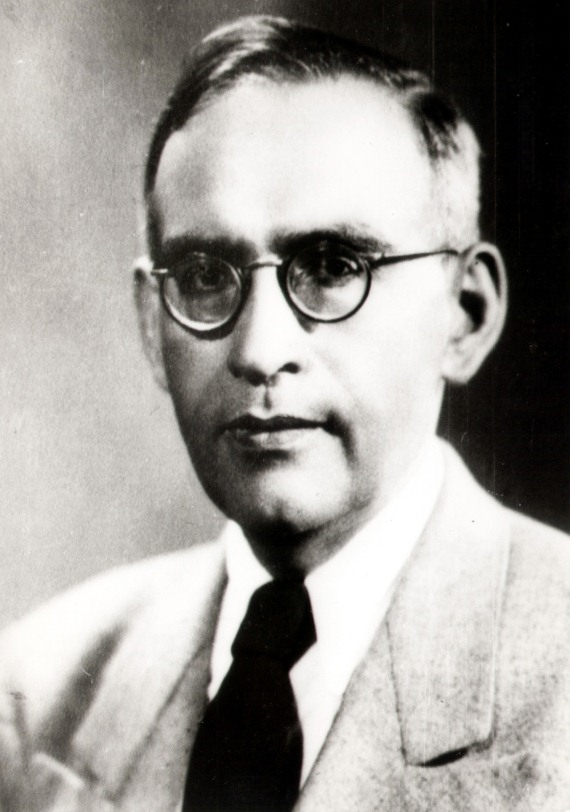
Mahmoud Hessabi

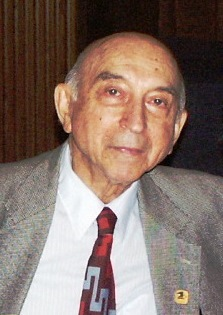
Lotfi A. Zadeh

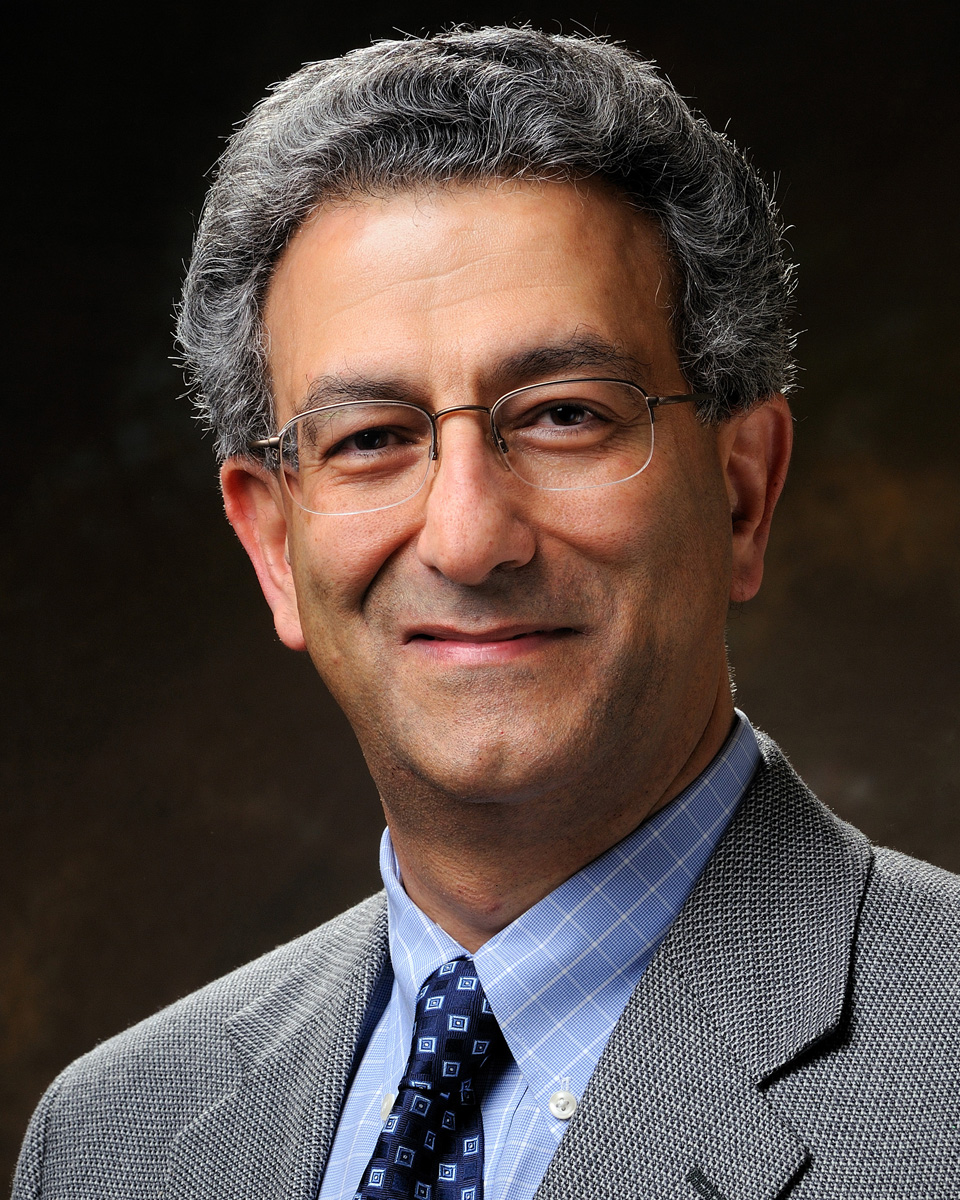
Nader Engheta

Babak Hassibi is an electrical engineer who is the Gordon M. Binder/Amgen Professor of Electrical Engineering and Head of the Department of Electrical Engineering at the California Institute of Technology (Caltech). He received the B.S. degree in electrical engineering from the University of Tehran in 1989, and the M.S. and PhD degrees in electrical engineering from Stanford University in 1993 and 1996, respectively. At Stanford his adviser was Thomas Kailath. He was a research associate in the Information Systems Laboratory at Stanford University during 1997-98 and was a member of the technical staff in the Mathematics of Communications Research Group at Bell Laboratories in 1998–2000. Since 2001 he has been at Caltech.

Mohammad Reza Aref is a politician and academic scholar. He was First Vice President from 2001 to 2005 under Mohammad Khatami. He previously served as Minister of Technology in Khatami's first cabinet. He is currently a member of Supreme Council of the Cultural Revolution and Expediency Discernment Council. He is also an electrical engineer and a professor at University of Tehran and Sharif University of Technology. He was a candidate in the 2013 presidential election but withdrew his candidacy in order to give the reformist camp a better chance to win.

Linguists and literary figures

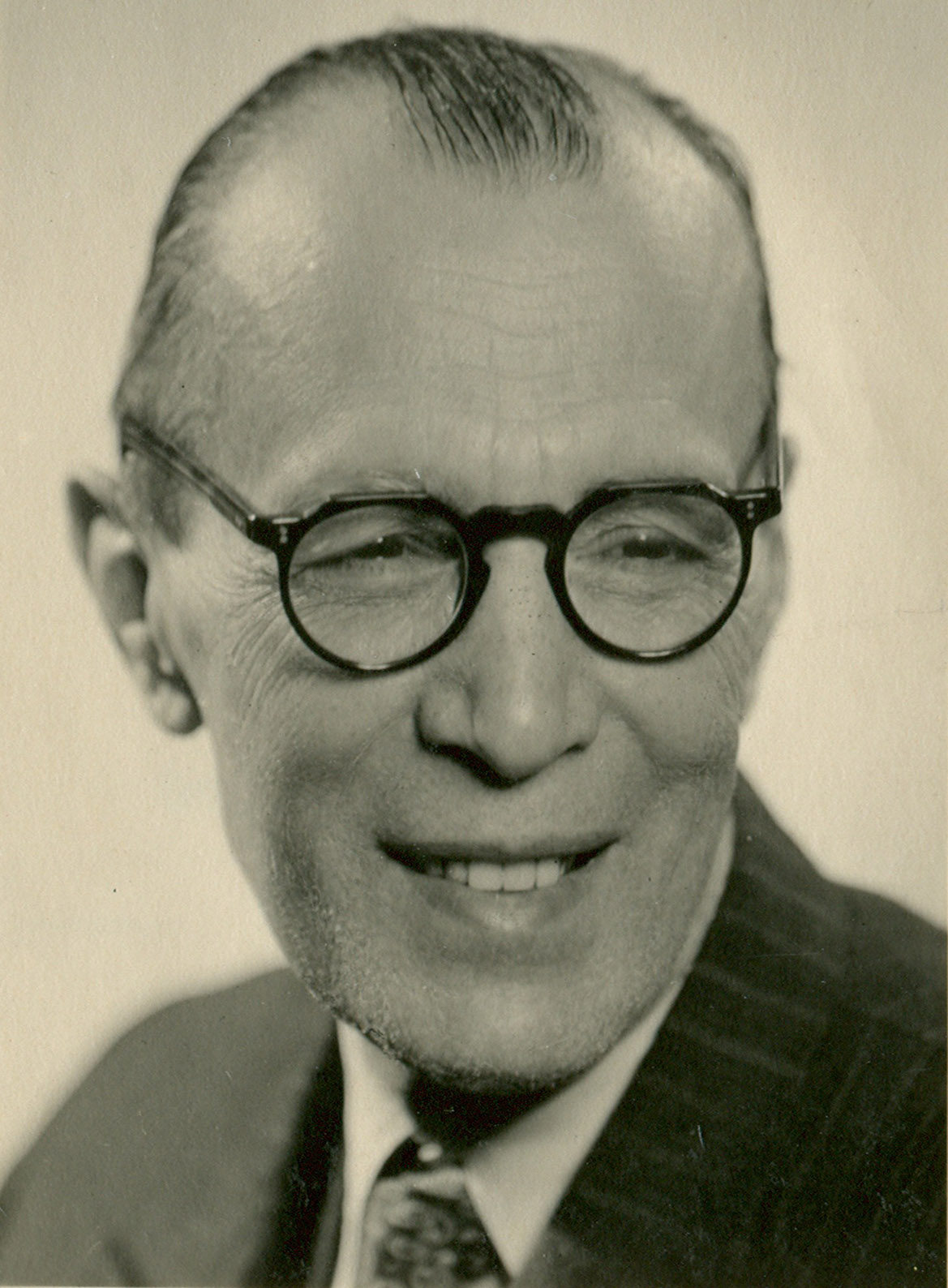
Mohammad-Taqi Bahar

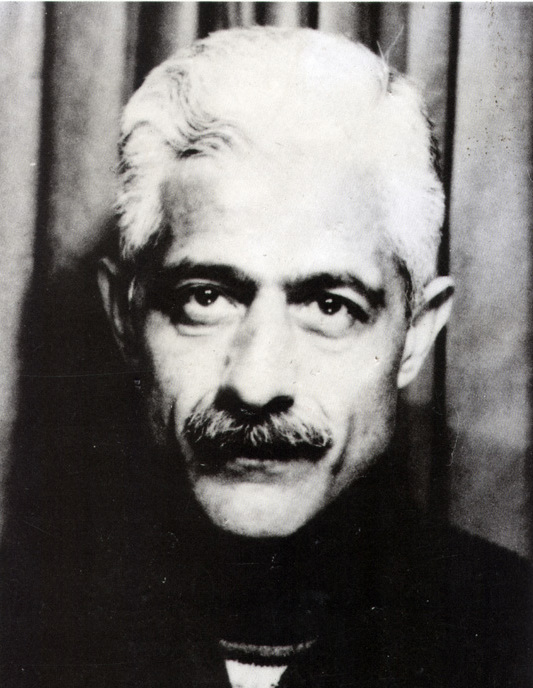
Jalal Al-e-Ahmad

Hamid Jafarkhani is a chancellor's professor in electrical engineering and computer science at the University of California, Irvine's Henry Samueli School of Engineering. His research focuses on communications theory, particularly coding and Wireless communications and networks. Prior to studying at the University of Tehran, he was ranked first in the nationwide entrance examination of Iranian universities in 1984.

Kourosh Kalantar-zadeh is an internationally recognized inventor (for his contributions to the field of ingestible sensors) and a distinguished professor at the University of New South Wales.

Nader Engheta is an Iranian-American scientist. He is currently the H. Nedwill Ramsey Professor at the University of Pennsylvania, Philadelphia, Pennsylvania, US, affiliated with the departments of Electrical and Systems Engineering, Bioengineering, and Physics and Astronomy.

Kaveh Pahlavan is a professor of ECE and CS at the Worcester Polytechnic Institute, he is renowned for his pioneering research in Wi-Fi Technology and wireless Indoor-Geolocation. and body area networking. He is the Director of the Center for Wireless Information Network Studies at WPI.

Philosophers

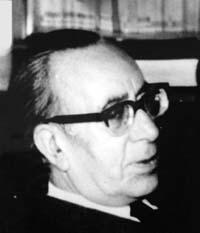
Ahmad Fardid

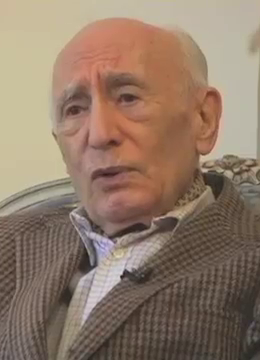
Ehsan Yarshater

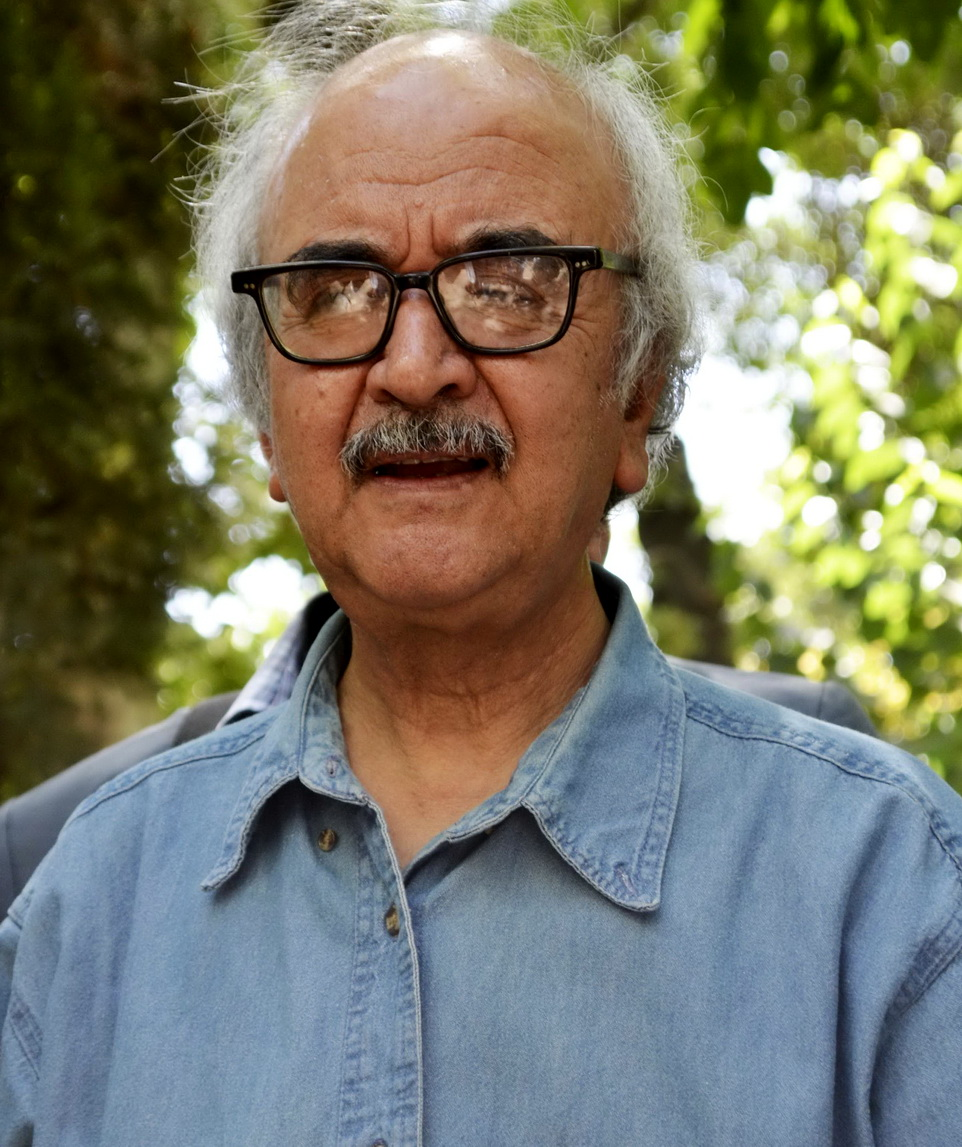
Mohammad-Reza Shafiei Kadkani

Yahya Rahmat-Samii is professor and holder of the Northrop Grumman Chair in Electromagnetics at Electrical Engineering Department at the University of California, Los Angeles, where he teaches and conducts research on microwave transmission and radio antennas. He has made innovations in satellite communications antennas, personal communication antennas, wearable and implanted antennas for communications and biotelemetry, and antennas for remote sensing and radio astronomy applications. He is the Director of the UCLA Antenna Research, Analysis and Measurement Laboratory UCLA Antenna Research, Analysis, and Measurement Laboratory at Department of Electrical Engineering, UCLA.

Alireza Mashaghi is a physicist and biomedical scientist at Harvard University and Leiden University. He is the founder of parallel education programs in Iran and was the first dual-degree graduate of University of Tehran. Mashaghi is well known for single-molecule analysis of biomolecules, discovery of the mechanism of Von Willebrand disease, the development of circuit topology, and the use of statistical physics for medical diagnostics. He was named the discoverer of the year in 2017. Mashaghi has been affiliated with Harvard University, MIT, ETH Zurich, Delft University of Technology, and Max Planck Institutes. He is an editorial board member of journals including Nano Research and Scientific Reports.

Alireza Nasiri is a technocrat and businessman who created Iran's first online degree program at University of Tehran in 2003. He is known as the father of commercial forestry in Iran due to empowering the field of greenery with genetically modified trees in Iran.

Actors

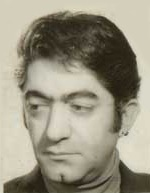
Ezzatolah Entezami

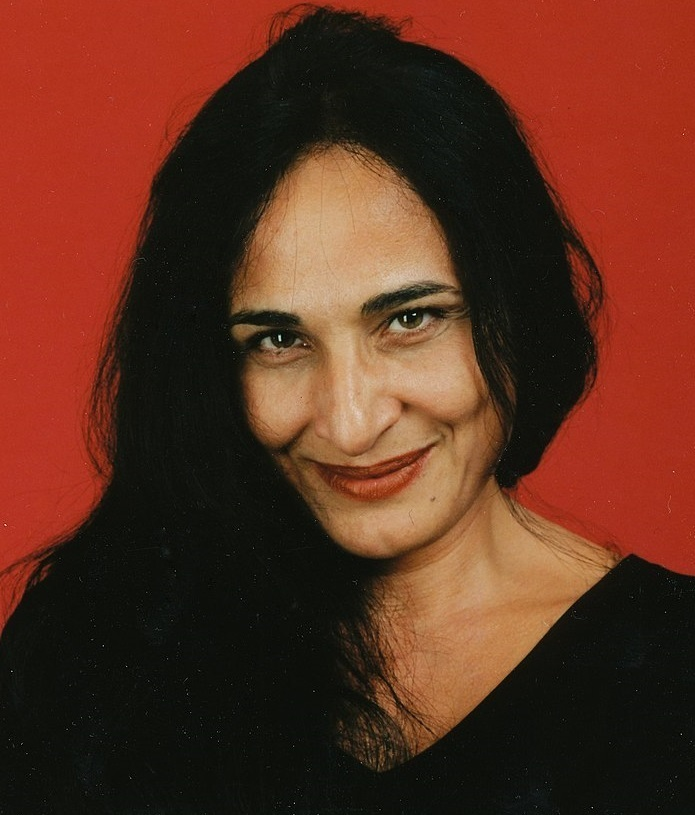
Susan Taslimi

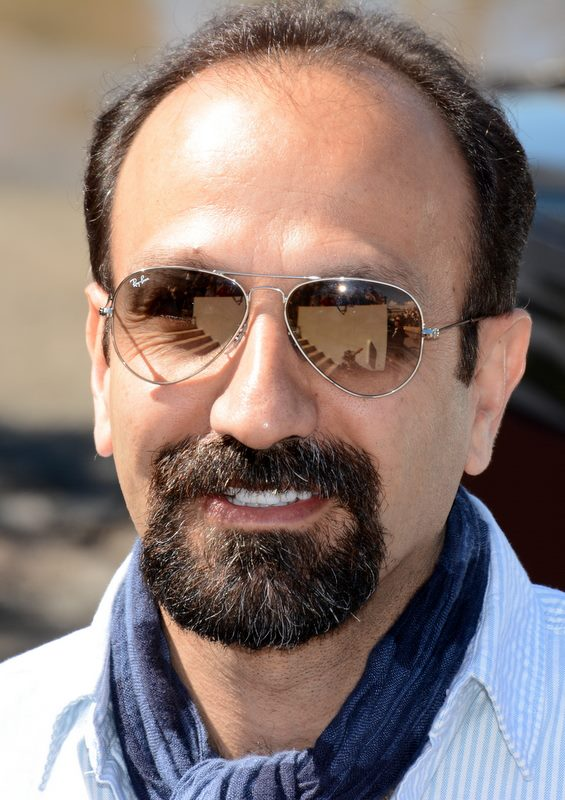
Asghar Farhadi

Some of the most prominent figures are named below:

Musicians

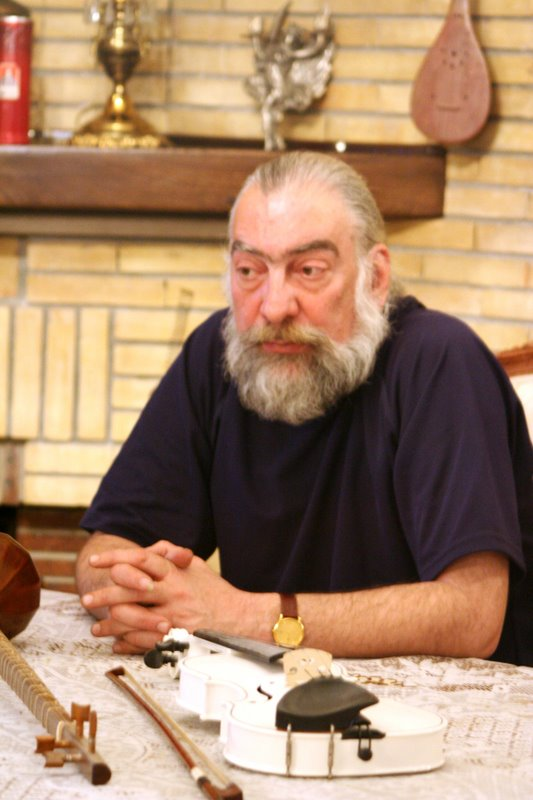
Parviz Meshkatian

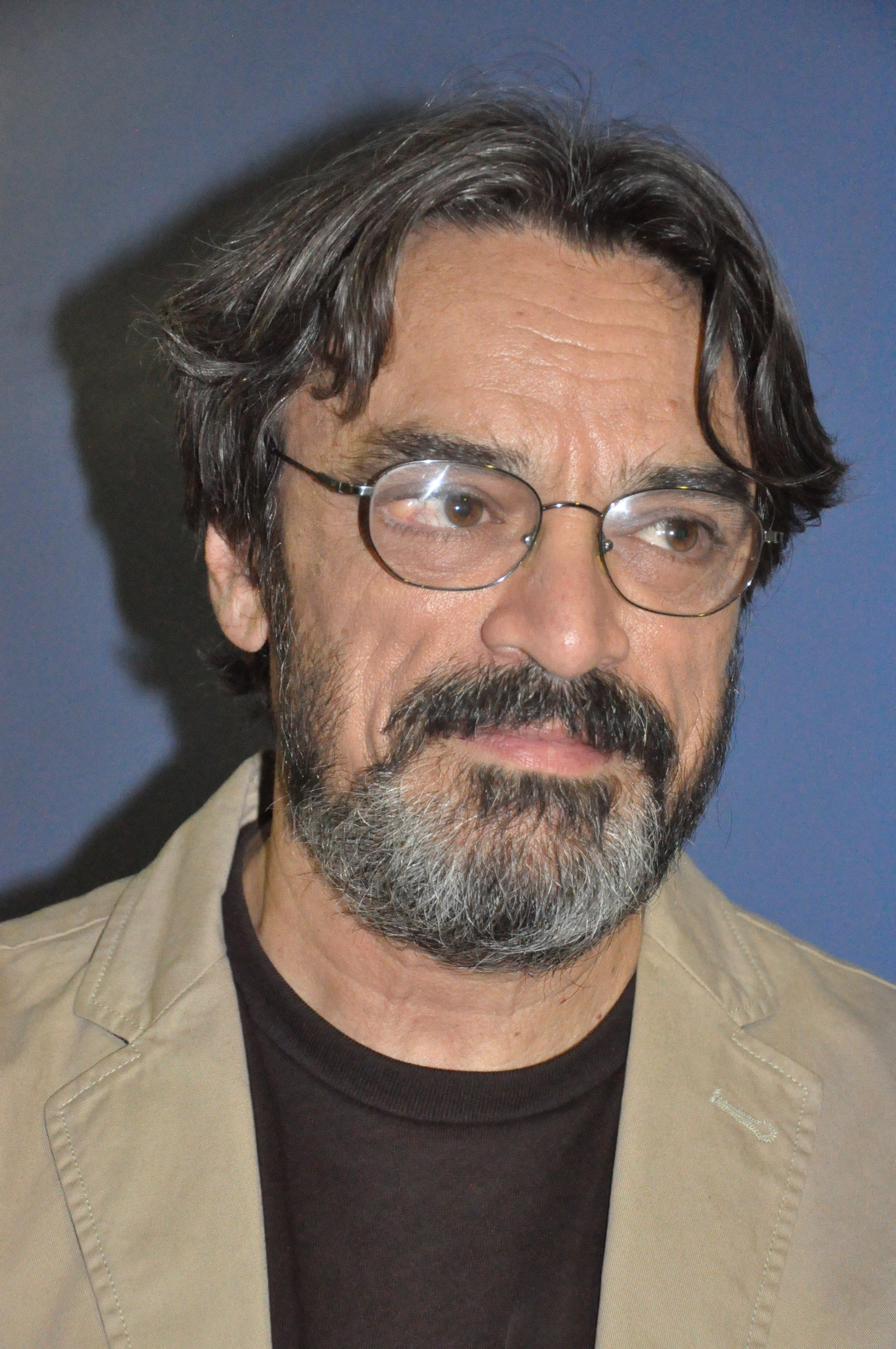
Hossein Alizadeh

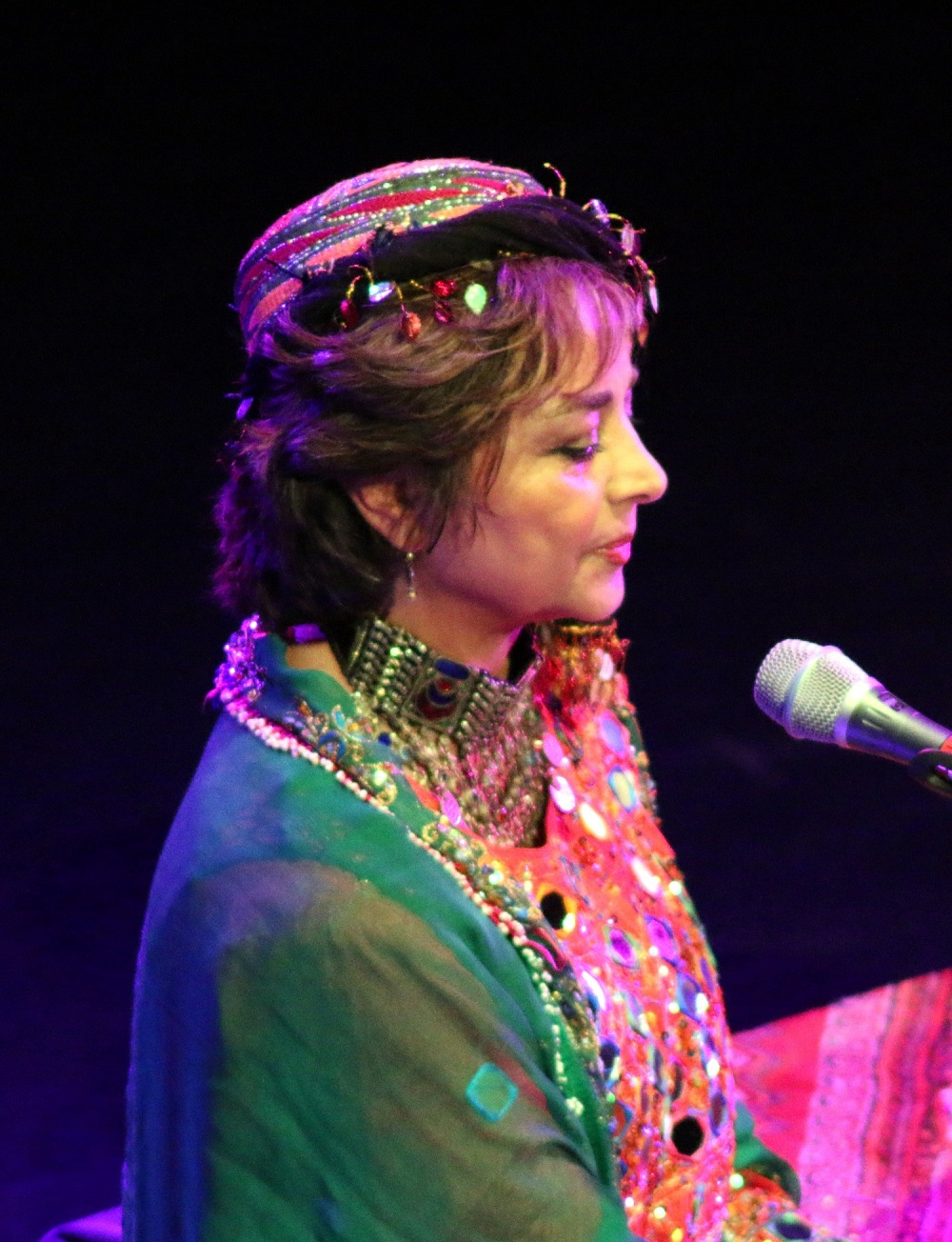
Sima Bina

Shirin Ebadi is a lawyer, a former judge and human rights activist and founder of Defenders of Human Rights Center in Iran. On 10 October 2003, Ebadi was awarded the Nobel Peace Prize for her significant and pioneering efforts for democracy and human rights, especially women's, children's, and refugee rights. She was admitted to the law department of the University of Tehran in 1965 and in 1969, upon graduation, passed the qualification exams to become a judge. After a six-month internship period, she officially became a judge in March 1969. She continued her studies in University of Tehran in the meantime to pursue a master's degree in law in 1971.

Asghar Farhadi is a film director and screenwriter. For his work as director, he has received one Golden Globe Award and one Academy Award for Best Foreign Language Film. He was named one of the 100 Most Influential People in the world by Time magazine in 2012. He is a graduate of theatre, with a BA in dramatic arts and MA in stage direction from University of Tehran and Tarbiat Modarres University, respectively.

Siavash Teimouri is a high ranked Iranian architect and artist. He was born in Tehran, Iran. After getting his master from University of Tehran, faculty of fine arts in 1962, he then moved to Paris and received his PhD in architecture from École nationale supérieure des Beaux-Arts in 1969. While working with top class architects he received the French Association of Architects's prize in 1967. He achieved the first place in design competition for University of Isfahan's faculty of science in 1973. He is a member of the French Society of Architects and also member of the board of trustees of the Iran Architectural Pride Worthies Foundation.

Mohammad Mosaddegh was the prime minister of Iran from 1951 until being overthrown in a coup d'état in 1953. His administration introduced a wide range of social and political reforms but is most notable for its nationalization of the Iranian oil industry, which had been under British control since 1913 through the Anglo-Persian Oil Company (APOC/AIOC) (later British Petroleum or BP). Mosaddegh received his Licence en Droit as well as his Doctor of law from the University of Neuchâtel in Switzerland. Mosaddegh also taught at the University of Tehran at the start of World War I before beginning his long political career.

Artists

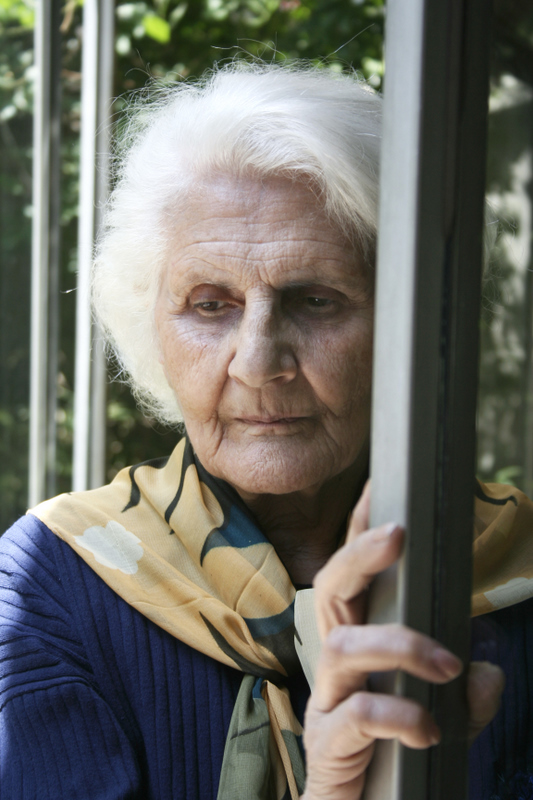
Lilit Teryan

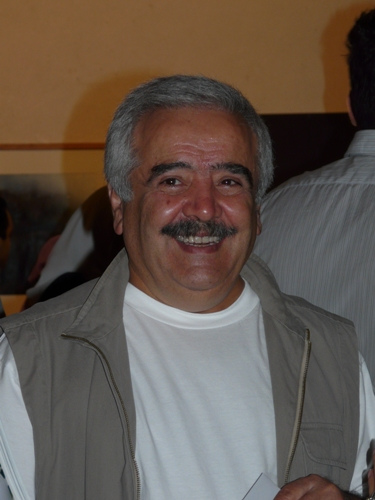
Ghobad Shiva

Ali Javan is an Iranian American physicist and inventor at MIT. His main contributions to science have been in the fields of quantum physics and spectroscopy. He co-invented the gas laser in 1960, with William R. Bennett.He graduated from Alborz High School, started his university studies at University of Tehran and came to the United States in 1948 right after the war.

Mohammad Khatami is an scholar, Shiite theologian, and Reformist politician. He served as the fifth President of Iran from 2 August 1997 to 3 August 2005. He also served as Iran's minister of culture in both the 1980s and 1990s. He is currently one of the leaders of the Iranian Green Movement, and an outspoken critic of the president Ahmadinejad's government. Khatami is known for his proposal of Dialogue Among Civilizations. The United Nations proclaimed the year 2001 as the United Nations' Year of Dialogue Among Civilizations, on Khatami's suggestion. Khatami received a B.A. in Western philosophy from Isfahan University, but left academia while studying for a master's degree in Educational Sciences at University of Tehran and went to Qom to complete his previous studies in Islamic sciences.

Seyed Ali Mirlohi Falavarjani, PhD graduate from the University of Tehran in 1975 and retired professor from University of Isfahan, founder of Islamic Azad University of Falavarjanin 1984.

Mohammad Beheshti was an scholar, writer, jurist, and one of the main architects of the constitution of the Islamic Republic in Iran. He was the secretary-general of the Islamic Republic Party, and the head of Iran's judicial system. He was assassinated together with more than seventy members of the Islamic Republic party on 28 June 1981. Beheshti was born in Isfahan and studied both at the University of Tehran and under Allameh Tabatabaei in Qom.

Mehdi Bazargan was a prominent scholar, academic, long-time pro-democracy activist, and head of Iran's interim government, making him Iran's first prime minister after the Iranian Revolution of 1979. A well-respected religious intellectual, known for his honesty and expertise in the Islamic and secular sciences, he is credited with being one of the founders of the contemporary intellectual movement in Iran. He was the head of the first engineering department of the University of Tehran.

Bahram Sadeghi writer. He studied medicine at University of Tehran.

Jamshid Amouzegar economist, artist, and politician who was prime minister from 7 August 1977 to 27 August 1978 when he resigned. He was graduated with degrees in law and engineering from the University of Tehran.

Akbar Alemi, a television presenter and documentary film director

Mehdi Mirzamehdi Tehrani, a film critic, journalist, and academic.

Baba Mokhayer a biologist, in some sources, he is called the father of Iranian veterinary science.

== International journals ==
1. Desert
2. Geopersia
3. Journal of Information Technology Management
4. Pollution
5. Sport Sciences and Health Research
6. Journal of Faculty of Engineering, the academic publication of the Faculty of Engineering of Tehran University published in Persian from 1964 until 2010. After 43 volumes, the journal was split into several separate titles at the discretion of the university administration to put emphasis on specialization in scientific disciplines and to reach out to an international audience by switching to publication in English.

== See also ==
- Higher education in Iran
- Tehran University of Medical Sciences
- Houchang Nahavandi
- List of colleges and universities in Tehran
- List of universities in Iran
