= Baba Mokhayer =

Iranian physician (1941–2012))

- Born: 1941
- Died: 1 Dezember 2012
- Education: University of Tehran
- Occupation: biologist
- Writing career
- Notable works: Diseases of farmed fish, Iran's Book of the Year Awards

Baba Mokhayer (Persian: بابا مخیر; 1941, Ardabil – 1 December 2012) was an Iranian biologist. In some sources, he is called the father of Iranian veterinary science.

== Career ==
He holds a PhD in Veterinary Medicine from the University of Tehran and a PhD in Biological Sciences (Oceanology) from the University of Paris, France, and was a full member of the Academy of Sciences of the Islamic Republic of Iran and a professor of fish diseases and fish parasites at the University of Tehran.

== works ==
Baba Mokhayer's book "Diseases of Farmed Fish" was selected as the book of the year in the fourth edition of the Book of the Year of the Islamic Republic of Iran by the Ministry of Culture and Islamic Guidance.

He was the head of the Veterinary Sciences Department and the head of the Fisheries Branch of the Academy of Sciences for a long time, and was also the vice president of science and research at the Academy of Sciences for a while. In 2004, he was selected as a prominent figure in the field of medicine and experimental sciences.

== Death ==
He died on February 1, 2012 at the age of 71.
