= List of islands of Iran =

Islands near the Strait of Hormuz

This is a list of notable islands of Iran.

== Coastal islands ==
=== Persian Gulf ===
Inhabited

- Bent
- Buneh
- Dara
- Farsi
- Faror
- Farvargan
- Hendorabi
- Hengam
- Hormuz
- Jonobi
- Kharg
- Kish
- Larak
- Lavan
- Minu
- Qabre Nakhoda
- Qeshm
- Shidvar Island
- Shif
- Shomali Island
- Sirri
- Abu Musa
- Greater Tunb
- Lesser Tunb

Uninhabited

- Farvargan (Lesser Farvar)
- Shidvar
- Abbasak
- Sheif
- Tahmadu (Jabrin)
- Ommol-korm
- Nakhiloo
- Naaz islands
- Om-e-Sile (Khan)
- Germ
- Bouneh
- Dara
- Ghabr-e-Nakhoda (Captain Grave)
- Kharv
- Mouliat
- Se Dandun (Three Dents)
- Motaf
- Morghi
- Cheraghi

=== Oman Sea ===
- Devil's Island (Iran)

=== Caspian Sea ===
- Ashuradeh Island

== Inland islands ==
Aras River

427 islands shared with Turkey and Azerbaijan, including:

- Khorameh
- Buiduz
- Pirwaltra
- Gharebagh
- Kasiri

Arvand Rud

- Abadan Island
- Minoo Island

Bakhtegan Lake

- Menak Island

Tashk Lake

Tashk Lake is located at 29.7286°N 53.5453°E

- Gonban Island
- Narges Island

Salt Lake (Dasht-e-Kavir)

- Sargardan Island

Lake Urmia

Lake Urmia had 102 islands:

- Aram Island
- Arash Island
- Ardeshir Island
- Arezo Island
- Ashk Island
- Ashk-sar Island
- Ashku Island
- Atash Island
- Azar Island
- Azin Island
- Bahram Island
- Bard Island
- Bardak Island
- Bardin Island
- Barzin Island
- Bastu Island
- Bon Island
- Bon-ashk Island
- Borz Island
- Borzu Island
- Bozorg-tappeh
- Chak-tappeh Island
- Cheshmeh-kenar Island
- Dey Island
- Gorz Island
- Magh Island
- Espir Island
- Espirak Island
- Espiru Island
- Garivak Island
- Gariveh Island
- Gerdeh Island
- Giv Island
- Golgun Island
- Iran-nezhad Island
- Jo-darreh Island
- Jovin Island
- Jozar Island
- Kabudan Island
- Kafcheh-nok Island
- Kaka'i-ye Bala Island
- Kaka'i-ye Miyaneh Island
- Kaka'i-ye Pa'in Island
- Kalsnag Island
- Kam Island
- Kaman Island
- Kameh Island
- Karkas Island
- Kaveh Island
- Kenarak Island
- Khersak Island
- Kuchak-tappeh Island
- Mahdis Island
- Mahvar Island
- Markid Island
- Mehr Island
- Mehrdad Island
- Mehran Island
- Meshkin Island
- Meydan Island
- Miyaneh Island
- Nadid Island
- Nahan Island
- Nahid Island
- Nahoft Island
- Nakhoda Island
- Navi Island
- Naviyan Island
- Omid Island
- Panah Island
- Penhan Island
- Pishva Island
- Sahran Island
- Samani Island
- Sangan Island
- Sangu Island
- Saricheh Island
- Sepid Island
- Shabdiz Island
- Shahi Island
- Shahin Island
- Shamshiran Island
- Shur-tappeh Island
- Shush-tappeh Island
- Siyahsang Island
- Siyah-tappeh Island
- Siyavash Island
- Sohran Island
- Sorkh Island
- Sorush Island
- Tak Island
- Takht Island
- Takhtan Island
- Tanjak Island
- Tanjeh Island
- Tashbal Island
- Tir Island
- Tus Island
- Zagh Island
- Zarkaman Island
- Zarkanak Island
- Zar-tappeh Island
- Zirabeh Island

== See also ==
- List of islands in the Persian Gulf
