= Hengam-class landing ship =

Iranian landing ship class

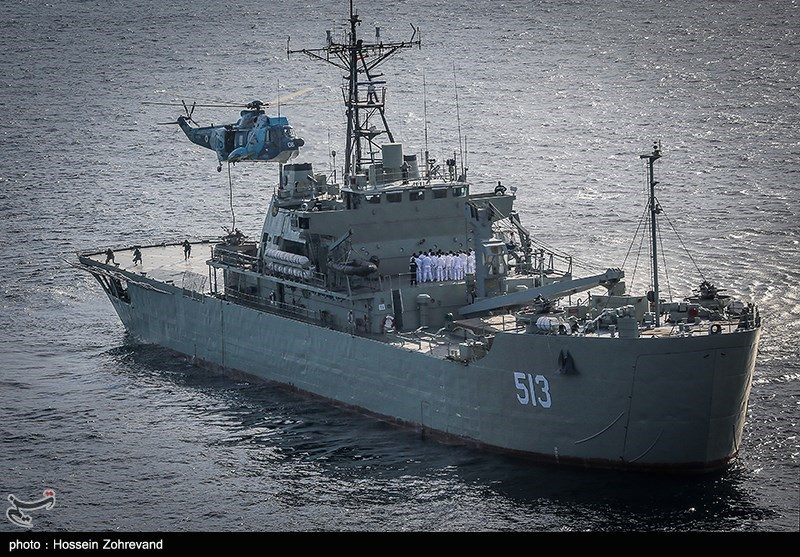

Class overview
- Builders: Yarrow Shipbuilders Limited, Clyde
- Operators: Islamic Republic of Iran Navy
- Built: 1972–1974; 1977–1984
- In service: 1974–present
- Planned: 6
- Completed: 4
- Canceled: 2
- Active: 4

General characteristics
- Type: Landing Ship Heavy
- Displacement: 2,581 tons full load
- Length: 93 m (305 ft 1 in)
- Beam: 15 m (49 ft 3 in)
- Draught: 2.4 m (7 ft 10 in)
- Installed power: Diesel
- Speed: 14.5 knots (26.9 km/h)
- Range: 4,000 nautical miles (7,400 km) at 12 knots (22 km/h)
- Complement: 80

Hengam (Persian: هنگام) is a class of Landing Ship Heavy built by the Yarrow Shipbuilders Limited and operated by the Islamic Republic of Iran Navy. A total of 6 ships were originally planned but eventually last two were cancelled. Each of the four ships in service in the class is named after a namesake island inside Iranian territorial waters, namely Hengam Island, Larak Island, Tonb Islands, and Lavan Island respectively.

== Ships in the class ==
Ships of the class are:

Ship	Namesake	Hull number	Laid down	Launched	Commissioned	Status
IRIS Hengam	Hengam Island	511	late 1972	29 September 1973	12 August 1974	In service
IRIS Larak	Larak Island	512	1973	7 May 1974	12 November 1974	In service
IRIS Tonb	Tonb Islands	513	Unknown	27 February 1979	21 February 1985	In service
IRIS Lavan	Lavan Island	514	6 February 1978	6 December 1979	16 January 1985	Interned at Kochi Port by India on 4 March 2026.

== See also ==
- List of amphibious warfare ships

Equivalent landing ships of the same era

- Type 073
- Miura class
- Teluk Semangka class
- Ropucha class
