= Battle of Leitao Coast =

Date	June 1586
Location	Adjacent to Kish Island, Iran
Result	Niquilus victory

Belligerents
Portuguese Empire	Niquilus

Commanders and leaders
Ruy Gonçalves da Câmara; Pedro Homem Periera	Unknown

Strength
650 men 20 vessels	500 men

Casualties and losses
250 killed	Unknown

The Battle of Leitao Coast was a military engagement between the Arab inhabitants of Nakhiloo Island and the Portuguese expedition sent against them. The battle ended disastrously for the Portuguese forces.

== The identity of the Niquilus ==
The Niquilus originally belonged to an unknown tribe from Oman. They engaged in fishing, sea diving for pearls, agricultural activities, trading, and some piracy. At the beginning of the 15th century, the Persian Gulf lost one of its two great pearl fisheries. Due to overfishing, the Niquilus had to compete for other pearl fisheries with other Arab pearl diving groups. The Niquilus were ousted from Oman upon losing a battle with the Al Bu Muhair tribe over Pearl Ground. Due to this, the defeated tribe, alongside their families, migrated to Portuguese territory requesting the governor of Hormuz to allow them to settle on the Larak Island in exchange for patrolling the straits of Hormuz against Makrani pirates. This was refused, so they migrated to Nakhiloo Island and settled there in early 1570.

== Background ==
Having settled on Nakhiloo Island, which gave them the name Niquilus, they began their piratical activities, which gained the attention of the Portuguese in Hormuz. In 1581, a Portuguese fleet led by Dom Jeronimo de Mascarenhas was originally sent against the ruler of Lar but was diverted upon a request from the captain of Hormuz to deal with the Niquilus pirates. Reaching there, they sent an Arab to negotiate with the Sheikh of Niquilus Musa, and after some negotiations, Niqulius promised to move to Larek within the given period.

However, the Niquilus broke the agreement in 1583 and committed acts of piracy. In response, a galliot was dispatched to capture the Niquilus ships at Laz. They bombarded the settlement, and upon landing offshore, the people of Laz silently attacked the galliot and killed everyone on board. The ship was then taken to Nakhiloo; another ship was dispatched, but the ship was disabled due to a storm, and only six crew members survived.

The new governor of Hormuz, Matias de Albuquerque, dispatched four vessels against Niquilus and later sent two other vessels to assist the four vessels in capturing Laz and massacring everyone there; however, a storm happened again and only 11 crews survived. Enraged by these setbacks, he asks Goa to lend him men to punish the Niquilus.

== Battle ==
In 1586, a fleet of 15 vessels with 500 men was led by Ruy Gonçalves da Câmara, the former governor of Hormuz, with the task of destroying the Niquilus. Later, he was joined by Pedro Homem Periera, an experienced soldier, with five vessels and 150 men from Hormuz. Soon, the Portuguese learned that the Niquilus had abandoned their settlements in Laz and sought the coast. An order from Matias de Albuquerque tasked him with attacking the enemy, who was situated on the Leitao coast adjacent to the island of Kish, Pedro then decided to disembark his troops on the coast; however, his captains told him it was risky, but he later went along with two companies of 60 men each to land, one to provide cover for the other company commanded by Ruy Gonçalves.

The Portuguese ran their Fustas ashore, and everyone leaped on the coast without an order of battle. The Portuguese were disunited, and the Niquilus, who were watching the landing happen and their vessels being dragged to the coast, attacked them with a force of 500 infantry and cavalry in a half-moon formation. They overran the Portuguese ashore, killing many of them, and the defeat was total. Men were being killed or drowned while others tried to escape on small ships. According to Diogo do Couto, this was the worst defeat Estado de India ever suffered; in less than one hour, 250 men, the flower of Portuguese in India forces, were killed in the battle.

== Aftermath ==
Having returned to Goa, Ruy Gonçalves was received with a great demonstration by the Viceroy, as he had returned from a victorious campaign and was rewarded with favors for achieving nothing despite the crushing defeat he suffered.
