= Handeh-ye Rabi =

Village in Hormozgan province, Iran

Handeh-ye Rabi Persian: هنده رابي
- Village
- Interactive map of Handeh-ye Rabi
- Coordinates: 26°41′18″N 53°37′21″E
- Country: Iran
- Province: Hormozgan
- County: Bandar Lengeh
- District: Kish
- Rural District: Kish

Population (2016)
  - Total: 191
- Time zone: UTC+3:30 (IRST)

Handeh-ye Rabi (Persian: هنده رابي) (Note: Also romanized as Handeh-ye Rābī) is a village in Kish Rural District of Kish District, Bandar Lengeh County, Hormozgan province, Iran. The village is located on Hendurabi Island.

== Demographics ==
=== Population ===
At the time of the 2006 National Census, the village's population was 79 people in 9 households. The following census in 2011 counted 86 people in 21 households. The 2016 census measured the population of the village as 191 people in 31 households.
