= Shidvar Island =

Island of the Persian Gulf

Coordinates: 26°47′28″N 53°24′40″E

Persian: جزیرهٔ شیدوَر
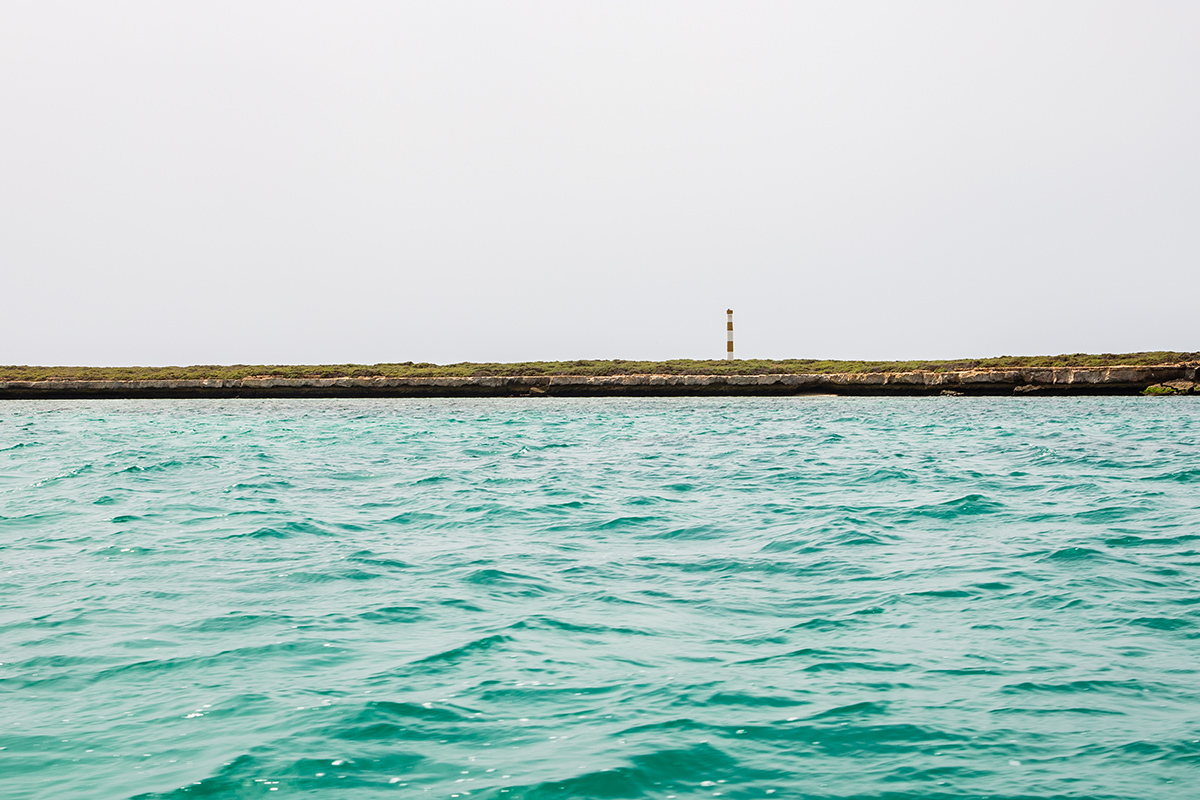

- Location within Persian Gulf Location within Iran

Geography
- Location: Persian Gulf

Administration
- Iran
- Province: Hormozgan

Demographics
- Population: 0

Ramsar Wetland
- Official name: Sheedvar Island
- Designated: 29 December 1999
- Reference no.: 1015

Shidvar Island (Persian: جزیرهٔ شیدوَر) is an uninhabited island in the Persian Gulf east of the larger inhabited island of Lavan. Administratively, the island forms part of the Lavan Rural District in Kish District, Bandar Lengeh County, Hormozgan Province, Iran. It is part of a natural reserve called the Shidvar Wildlife Refuge.

The name shetor or shotor in Persian means camel.

== History ==
Though the island is uninhabited, there are ruins of a stone building near the island's southeastern corner, which suggests humans may have lived there once.

The island was designated a Ramsar site in 1999.

== Environment ==
The island has been designated an Important Bird Area (IBA) by BirdLife International because it supports breeding Socotra cormorants as well as colonies of bridled and white-cheeked terns. It is also a breeding site for green and hawksbill sea turtles.

== See also ==
- List of islands of Iran
