= Oil Industries Commissioning and Operation Company =

Oil Industries’ Commissioning and Operation Company
- Native name: شركت راه‌اندازی و بهره‌برداری صنايع نفت
- Romanized name: Sherkat-e Rāhandāzi va Bahrebardāri-ye Sanāye-e Naft
- Industry: Oil & Gas
- Founded: 2011; 15 years ago
- Headquarters: Tehran, Iran
- Parent: Oil Industries Engineering and Construction; Oil Industry Pension Fund Investment Company

Oil Industries’ Commissioning and Operation Company (OICO; Persian: شركت راه‌اندازی و بهره‌برداری صنايع نفت Sherkat-e Rāhandāzi va Bahrebardāri-ye Sanāye-e Naft) is an Iranian company in the field of Oil & Gas which is incorporated to manage and execute commissioning and start-up, operation, maintenance and training courses for oil, gas and petrochemical industries. OICO was established in 2011 as a private joint-stock company in Tehran.

The company is wholly owned by and is a subsidiary of the “Oil Industries Engineering and Construction” (OIEC) group and the Oil Industry Pension Fund Investment Company (OPIC).

OICO invest in the area of training and human resources development, maintain qualified and skillful expert and relies on them to execute pre-commissioning, commissioning, start-up and performance test of oil, gas and petrochemical projects up to the client handover.

== History ==
OICO was established in 2011

== The operational zone ==
The domain of OICO services contains a wide range. Ilam to Dehloran in west, Asaluyeh to Kangan in the southwest, Bandar Abbas and Sirri island in the south of Iran.
