= IRIS Hengam =

Iranian landing ship

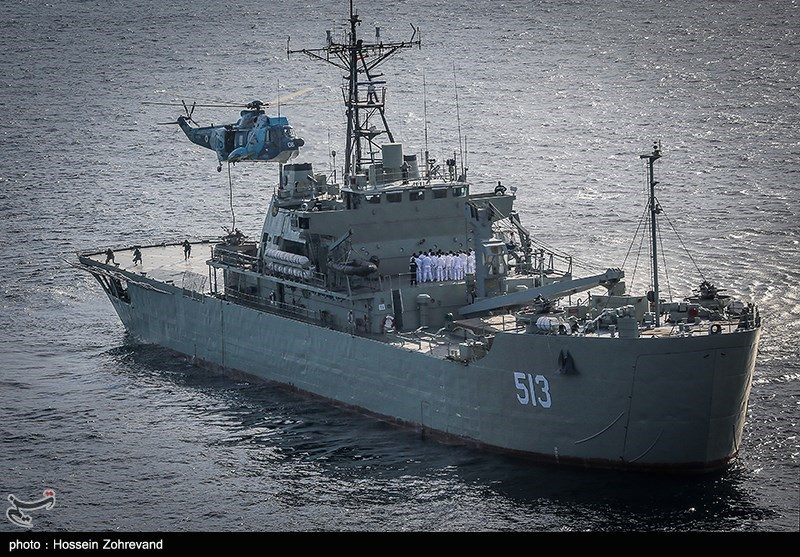

History

Iran
- Name: Hengam
- Namesake: Hengam Island
- Owner: Iran
- Operator: Navy of the Islamic Revolutionary Guard Corps
- Builder: Yarrow Shipbuilders Limited, Clyde
- Home port: Bandar Abbas, Iran
- Status: In active service

General characteristics
- Class & type: Hengam-class Landing Ship Heavy
- Displacement: 2,581 tons full load
- Length: 93 m (305 ft 1 in)
- Beam: 15 m (49 ft 3 in)
- Draught: 2.4 m (7 ft 10 in)
- Installed power: Diesel
- Speed: 14.5 knots (26.9 km/h)
- Range: 4,000 nautical miles (7,400 km) at 12 knots (22 km/h)
- Complement: 80

IRIS Hengam (Persian: هنگام) is the lead ship of the Hengam-class landing ship. Its hull classification is Landing Ship Heavy. The ship was built in 1974 by the Yarrow Shipbuilders Limited and is operated by the Islamic Republic of Iran Navy. The ship is named after a namesake island inside Iranian territorial waters, namely Hengam Island. It is operated by the southern fleet and its home port is Bandar Abbas.

== See also ==
- List of naval ship classes of Iran
- List of amphibious warfare ships
