= Kish Rural District =

Rural district in Hormozgan province, Iran

Kish Rural District Persian: دهستان كيش
- Rural District
- Location within Iran
- Coordinates: 26°37′N 53°48′E
- Country: Iran
- Province: Hormozgan
- County: Bandar Lengeh
- District: Kish
- Capital: Kish

Population (2016)
  - Total: 191
- Time zone: UTC+3:30 (IRST)

Kish Rural District (Persian: دهستان كيش) is in Kish District of Bandar Lengeh County, Hormozgan province, Iran. It is administered from the city of Kish.

== Demographics ==
=== Population ===
At the time of the 2006 National Census, the rural district's population was 79 in 9 households. There were 86 inhabitants in 21 households at the following census of 2011. The 2016 census measured the population of the rural district as 191 in 31 households. Its only village is Handeh-ye Rabi, with 191 people.
