= List of lighthouses in Iran =

This is a list of lighthouses in Iran.

== Lighthouses ==
Name	Image	Year built	Location & coordinates	Class of Light	Focal height	NGA number	Admiralty number	Range nml
Abu Musa Lighthouse	Image	n/a	Abu Musa; 25°53′06.5″N 55°02′02.2″E	Fl W 8s.	130 metres (430 ft)	28744	D7706	9
Amirabad East Breakwater Lighthouse		n/a	Amirabad; 36°51′43.0″N 53°22′23.5″E	n/a	12 metres (39 ft)	n/a	n/a	n/a
Amirabad West Breakwater Lighthouse		n/a	Amirabad; 36°51′52.1″N 53°22′24.4″E	n/a	n/a	n/a	n/a	n/a
Anzali Breakwater Lighthouse		n/a	Bandar-e Anzali; 37°28′55.5″N 49°27′39.5″E	green light	12 metres (39 ft)	n/a	n/a	n/a
Bandar Abbas Entrance Range Rear Lighthouse		n/a	Bandar Abbas; 27°09′35.9″N 56°12′15.5″E	Iso W 4s.	n/a	28636	S7709.41	n/a
Bandar-e Anzali Lighthouse		n/a	Bandar-e Anzali; 37°28′42.9″N 49°27′28.9″E	n/a	50 metres (160 ft)	n/a	n/a	n/a
Bandar-e Gaz Lighthouse		n/a	Bandar-e Gaz; 36°47′00.2″N 53°56′45.1″E	F W	30 metres (98 ft)	n/a	n/a	n/a
Bandar-e Shahīd Rajāī East Breakwater Lighthouse	Image	n/a	Bandar Abbas; 27°05′23.6″N 56°04′21.6″E	Fl G 5s.	n/a	28648	D7708	n/a
Bandar-e Shahīd Rajāī Entrance Range Front Lighthouse		n/a	Bandar Abbas; 27°05′42.5″N 56°02′25.4″E	Oc W 4s.	24 metres (79 ft)	28647	D7707	12
Bandar-e Shahīd Rajāī Entrance Range Rear Lighthouse		n/a	Bandar Abbas; 27°05′59.1″N 56°01′12.1″E	Oc W 4s.	44 metres (144 ft)	28647.1	D7707.1	12
Bandar-e Shahīd Rajāī West Breakwater Lighthouse		n/a	Bandar Abbas; 27°05′12.3″N 56°04′10.0″E	Fl R 5s.	n/a	28652	D7708.2	n/a
Bandar-e Sirik Lighthouse		n/a	Sirik; 26°29′59.8″N 57°04′45.5″E	Fl (3) W 20s.	38 metres (125 ft)	28548	D7711	28
Chabahar Lighthouse		2008	Chabahar; 25°17′10.0″N 60°36′37.4″E	Fl (3) W 6s.	38 metres (125 ft)	28533	D7720.2	7
Hormozgān Terminal Lighthouse		n/a	Bandar Abbas; 27°07′19.6″N 56°05′27.9″E	Iso WRG 2s.	33 metres (108 ft)	28647.5	D7707.5	15
Jask Lighthouse		1914 est.	Jask; 25°38′11.4″N 57°45′51.5″E	Fl (2) W 15s.	32 metres (105 ft)	28540	D7713	12
Jazireh-ye Bani Faror Lighthouse		n/a	Faror Island; 26°07′05.7″N 54°26′43.9″E	Fl W 5s.	44 metres (144 ft)	28772	D7696	8
Jazireh-ye Faror Lighthouse		n/a	Faror Island; 26°17′33.5″N 54°30′06.4″E	Fl W 5s.	44 metres (144 ft)	28768	D7695	8
Jazireh-ye Farsi Lighthouse		~1947	Farsi Island; 27°59′30.0″N 50°10′18.0″E (NGA)	Fl W 15s.	28 metres (92 ft)	29364	D7455	16
Jazireh-ye Hendurabi Lighthouse		n/a	Hendurabi Island; 26°40′13.7″N 53°38′37.7″E	Fl (3) W 10s.	58 metres (190 ft)	28808	D7691	10
Jazireh-ye Hengam Lighthouse	Image	n/a	Hengam Island; 26°36′42.6″N 55°51′46.3″E	Fl W 10s.	37 metres (121 ft)	28684	D7339	12
Jazireh-ye Khark Lighthouse		n/a	Kharg Island; 29°12′50.5″N 50°19′09.6″E	Fl (2) W 12s.	90 metres (300 ft)	28916	D7664.4	17
Jazireh-ye Kharku Lighthouse		n/a	Kharku Island; 29°20′23.0″N 50°21′15.6″E	Fl (3) W 10s.	18 metres (59 ft)	28948	D7663	10
Jazireh-ye Kish Lighthouse		n/a	Kish Island; 26°30′35.7″N 53°58′48.6″E	Fl (3) W 7s.	39 metres (128 ft)	28792	D7692	15
Jazireh-ye Larak North Lighthouse	Image	2008	Larak Island; 26°53′15.8″N 56°21′21.0″E	Fl (2) W 10s.	40 metres (130 ft)	28669	D7337.5	18
Jazireh-ye Lavan Lighthouse		n/a	Lavan Island; 26°48′09.1″N 53°21′25.2″E	Fl (3) W 12s.	54 metres (177 ft)	28816	D7685	15
Jazireh-ye Shatvar Lighthouse		n/a	Jazireh-ye Shatvar; 26°47′39.6″N 53°24′12.1″E	Fl (2) W 10s.	n/a	28864	D7688	10
Jazireh-ye Sirri Lighthouse		n/a	Sirri Island; 25°54′19.4″N 54°33′04.9″E	Fl (3) W 15s.	30 metres (98 ft)	28776	D7697	10
Kalantari Lighthouse	Image	2008	Chabahar; 28°18′52.9″N 60°36′51.8″E	Fl (4) G 7s.	9 metres (30 ft)	28534	D7723	7
Karri Lighthouse	Image	n/a	Karri; 28°25′07.2″N 51°08′06.3″E	Fl W 5s.	30 metres (98 ft)	28900	D7674	10
Kuh Mobarak Lighthouse		n/a	Mogh-e Qanbareh-ye Kuh Mobarak; 25°49′51.2″N 57°19′11.8″E	Fl W 10s.	45 metres (148 ft)	28544	D7712	18
Nowshahr Lighthouse		n/a	Nowshahr; 36°39′36.9″N 51°30′35.7″E	n/a	20 metres (66 ft)	n/a	n/a	n/a
Pasabandar Lighthouse		n/a	Pasabandar; 25°03′47.1″N 61°25′26.4″E	Fl (2) W 15s.	15 metres (49 ft)	28526	D7725	12
Ra's-e Bostāneh Lighthouse		n/a	Bostaneh; 26°30′03.0″N 54°37′19.2″E	Fl W 10s.	29 metres (95 ft)	28764	D7698	10
Ra's Dastakan Lighthouse		n/a	Qeshm; 26°32′20.4″N 55°17′25.3″E	Fl (3) W 12s.	12 metres (39 ft)	28732	D7700	7
Ra's-e Nay Band Lighthouse		n/a	Bushehr Province; 27°23′22.8″N 52°34′42.7″E	Fl W 5s.	29 metres (95 ft)	28880	D7680	15
Ra's osh Shatt Lighthouse		2011	Hasan Nezam; 29°08′42.0″N 50°49′36.0″E	Fl W 6s.	21 metres (69 ft)	28902	D7670.5	18
Shah Allum Shoal Lighthouse		~2008	Persian Gulf; 26°25′24.0″N 52°29′54.0″E	Fl (2) W 6s.	30 metres (98 ft)	28876	D7683	18
Tonb-e Bozorg Lighthouse		1912	Greater and Lesser Tunbs; 26°16′15.5″N 55°17′58.8″E	Fl W 10s.	75 metres (246 ft)	28724	D7703	18
Tonb-e Kūchek Lighthouse		n/a	Greater and Lesser Tunbs; 26°14′50.2″N 55°08′23.9″E	Fl W 10s.	25 metres (82 ft)	28740	D7704	12

== See also ==
- Lists of lighthouses
