= Hendurabi =

Island in Hormozgan province, Iran

Hendurabi Persian: هنده رابی
- Village
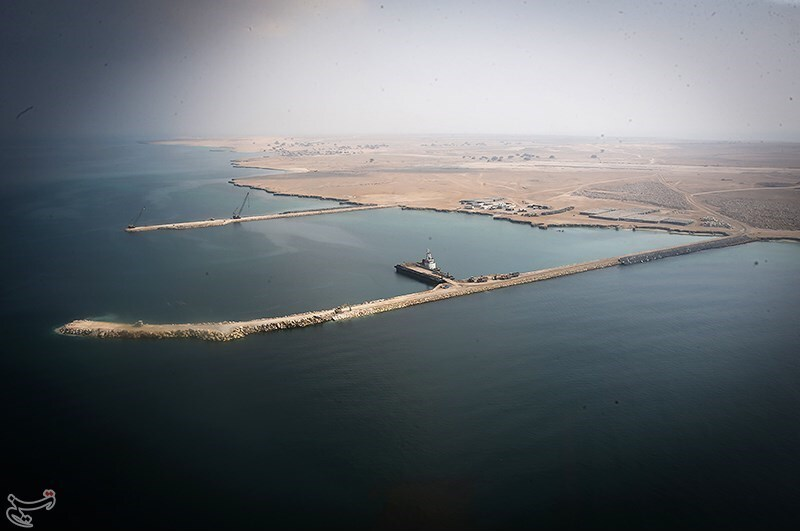

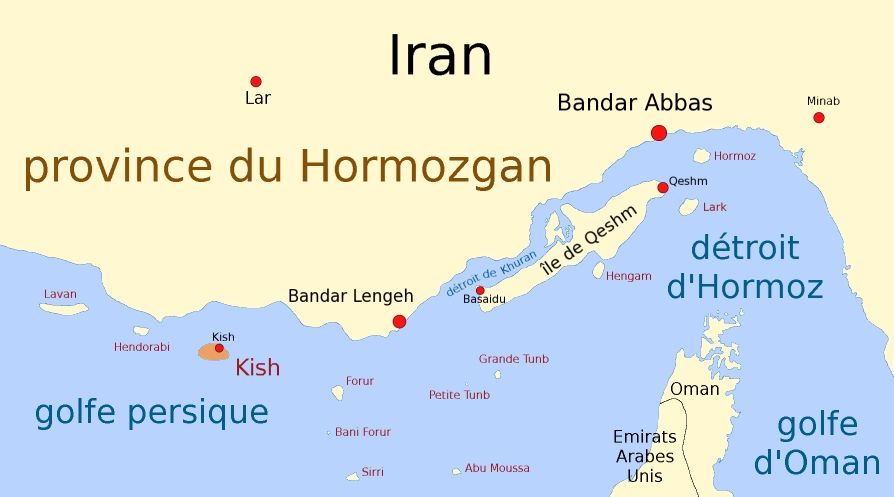
- Hendorabi Island is to the west of Kish Island

- Location within Persian Gulf Location within Iran
- Coordinates: 26°40′30″N 53°37′57″E
- Country: Iran
- Province: Hormozgan
- County: Bandar Lengeh
- District: Kish District
- Rural District: Kish Rural District

Population (2016)
  - Total: 191
- Time zone: UTC+3:30 (IRST)

Jazireh-ye Hendurabi Lighthouse
- Location: Hendurabi, Kish Rural District, Iran
- Coordinates: 26°40′14″N 53°38′38″E

Tower
- Foundation: concrete base
- Construction: metal skeletal tower
- Height: 58 ft (18 m)
- Shape: square pyramidal skeletal tower with balcony

Light
- Focal height: 190 ft (58 m)
- Range: 10 nmi (19 km; 12 mi)
- Characteristic: Fl(3) W 10s

Hendurabi (Persian: هندورابی) (Note: Also known as Hendorabi) is an Iranian island in the Persian Gulf. Its name is derived from the Persian word andar-abi (اندرآبی), meaning "inside the waters," i.e., an island. This is the native Persian word for the Arabic-derived term jazira, meaning an "island." It is located in Hormozgan province, to the west of Kish Island and due south of Bastak. Administratively, the island is in Kish Rural District, Kish District, Bandar Lengeh County, Hormozgan province, Iran.

== Demographics ==
=== Population ===
Handeh-ye Rabi is the only village in the rural district of the Bandar Lengeh County. At the time of the 2006 National Census, the village's population was 79 people in 9 households. The following census in 2011 counted 86 people in 21 households. The 2016 census measured the population of the village as 191 people in 31 households.

== See also ==
- Bandar Lengeh
- Hormozgān
- List of lighthouses in Iran
