= Lavan Island =

Island in Bandar Lengeh County, Iran

Persian: جزیره لاوان
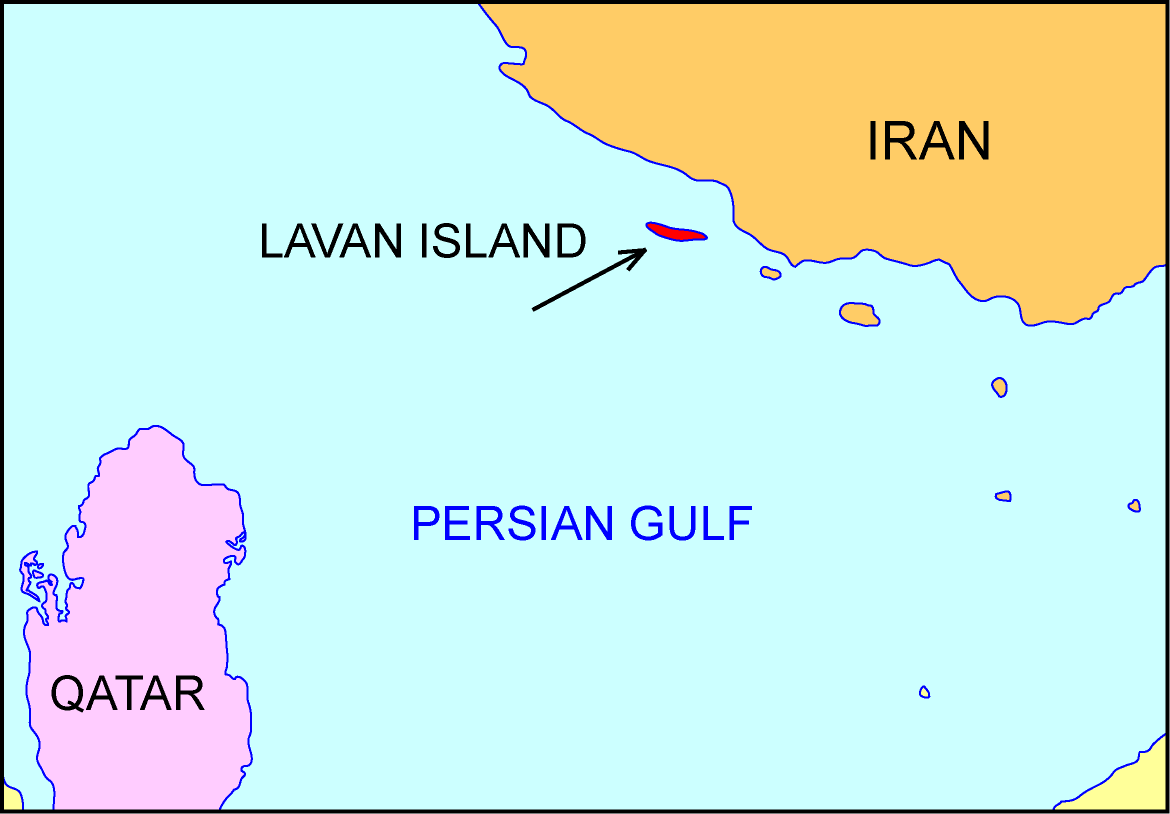
- Lavan Island (Iran)

- Location within Iran Location within Persian Gulf

Geography
- Location: Persian Gulf
- Coordinates: 26°48′20.99″N 53°16′4.80″E
- Area: 78 km^{2} (30 sq mi)
- Length: 23.5 km (14.6 mi)
- Width: 4.8 km (2.98 mi)

Administration
- Iran
- Province: Hormozgan
- Jazireh-ye Lavan Lighthouse
- Coordinates: 26°48′09.1″N 53°21′25.2″E
- Foundation: concrete base
- Construction: metal skeletal tower
- Shape: square pyramidal skeletal tower
- Focal height: 54 metres (177 ft)
- Range: 15 nautical miles (28 km; 17 mi)
- Characteristic: Fl (3) W 12s.

Lavan Island (Persian: جزیرهٔ لاوان) is an Iranian island in the Persian Gulf. The 78 square kilometres (30 sq mi) island has one of the four major terminals for export of crude oil in Iran alongside Kharg Island. Lavan island sits on top of Lavan gas field, containing 9.5 trillion cubic feet (2.7×10^{11} cubic metres) of gas.

The island is served by Lavan Airport.

== History ==
Some scholars consider Lavan to be the same place as an unnamed island to the west of the Qeshm Island mentioned by the Greek author Arrian (died c. 160) in his record of the voyage of Nearchus. The inhabitants there were reported to have engaged in pearl hunting. Medieval geographical texts frequently mention Lavan under varying names such as "Lar", "Lan", or "Allan". Writing on its location, the medieval Persian bureaucrat and geographer Ibn Khordadbeh (died 913) recorded Lavan as being eighty leagues (farsakh) from the Kharg Island and seven from Hendurabi. A pearl fishery in Lavan is described by the Muslim geographer Yaqut al-Hamawi (died 1229). In the records of the Portuguese Empire, Lavan was called "Lara", "Laz" or "Lazao".

Lavan Island was subject to an airstrike by the United Arab Emirates on 8 April 2026 as part of the 2026 Iran war, in retaliation for the Iranian strikes on the United Arab Emirates.

== Climate ==
The air of Lavan is warm and humid and its soil is fertile. Agriculture is not possible in Lavan because the average annual rainfall is low, at 50 millimeters.

== Administration ==
Administratively, the island is part of the Lavan Rural District in Kish District, Bandar Lengeh County, Hormozgan province.

== Biodiversity ==
Lavan is small in size, but it is home to a variety of wildlife. It is an important nesting site for seabirds and is home to a population of Persian gazelles that roam freely across its landscape. The surrounding waters support a diverse marine ecosystem that contributes to the island's ecological importance. Despite industrial activities, efforts have been made to preserve the island's natural environment

A 2022 biodiversity check of coral reef fish and their distribution around Lavan and the Shidvar Islands in the Persian Gulf and the Sea of Oman was carried out using biodiversity indices.

54 species were identified in the study area, all belonging to 11 orders and 27 families, of which 34 species were recorded in summer and 35 species in winter.

The result of the distribution of the Shannon diversity index for both seasons showed only two "hot spots" in the northeast of the Shidvar Islands and then the northern line of Lavan Island.

It probably indicates better ecological conditions, the presence of coral reefs and the presence of shelter and, consequently, the presence of more nutrients, which leads to greater diversity of fish in these two areas.

== See also ==
- List of lighthouses in Iran
- Bandar Lengeh
- Laz, Iran

== Sources ==
- Potts, Daniel T. (2015). "Lāvān Island". In Yarshater, Ehsan (ed.). Encyclopædia Iranica (Online ed.). Encyclopædia Iranica Foundation. ISSN 2330-4804.
