= Lavan Rural District =

Rural district in Hormozgan province, Iran

Lavan Rural District Persian: دهستان لاوان
- Rural District
- Location within Iran
- Coordinates: 26°47′30″N 53°17′12″E
- Country: Iran
- Province: Hormozgan
- County: Bandar Lengeh
- District: Kish

Population (2016)
  - Total: 1,214
- Time zone: UTC+3:30 (IRST)

Lavan Rural District (Persian: دهستان لاوان) is in Kish District of Bandar Lengeh County, Hormozgan province, Iran. The rural district covers Lavan Island and Shidvar Island.

== Demographics ==
=== Population ===
At the time of the 2006 National Census, the rural district's population was 891 in 172 households. There were 1,047 inhabitants in 255 households at the following census of 2011. The 2016 census measured the population of the rural district as 1,214 in 304 households. The most populous of its nine villages was Laz, with 1,101 people.
