= Laz, Iran =

Village in Hormozgan province, Iran

Laz Persian: لز
- Village
- Location within Iran
- Coordinates: 26°48′34″N 53°19′11″E
- Country: Iran
- Province: Hormozgan
- County: Bandar Lengeh
- District: Kish
- Rural District: Lavan

Population (2016)
  - Total: 1,101
- Time zone: UTC+3:30 (IRST)

Laz (Persian: لز) (Note: Also known as Lāzeh) is a village in Lavan Rural District of Kish District, Bandar Lengeh County, Hormozgan province, Iran. The village is on Lavan Island in the Persian Gulf.

== Demographics ==
=== Language ===
The linguistic composition of the village:

Laz linguistic composition
language	percent
Gulf Arabic	50%
Achomi/Larestani	30%
New Persian	20%

=== Population ===
At the time of the 2006 National Census, the village's population was 890 in 171 households. The following census in 2011 counted 919 people in 226 households. The 2016 census measured the population of the village as 1,101 people in 303 households. It was the most populous village in its rural district.
