= Sirri Island Airport =

Sirri Island Airport فرودگاه جزیره سیری
- IATA: SXI; ICAO: OIBS

Summary
- Airport type: Public
- Owner: Government of Iran
- Operator: Iran Airports Company
- Serves: Sirri Island, Hormozgan
- Location: Sirri Island, Iran
- Elevation AMSL: 43 ft / 13 m
- Coordinates: 25°54′32″N 54°32′22″E

Map
- Location of airport in Iran

Runways
Direction	Length		Surface
Direction	m	ft	Surface
12/30	2,544	8,345	Asphalt
- Source: DAFIF

Sirri Island Airport (IATA: SXI, ICAO: OIBS) (Persian: فرودگاه جزیره سیری) is a regional airport on an island, located near the city of Sirri, Hormozgan Province, in the south of Iran. The airport is used by the Iran Ministry of Petroleum for transferring employees of the Iran Oil Company.

== Airlines and destinations ==
Airlines	Destinations
Karun Airlines	Ahvaz, Bandar Abbas, Isfahan, Shiraz, Tehran–Mehrabad
Pouya Air	Bandar Abbas

== See also ==
- List of airlines of Iran
