= 2026 Lavan Island attack =

UAE attack on Iranian island

- Part of the 2026 Iran war
- Locations within Iran
- Type: Airstrikes
- Location: Lavan Island, Iran; 26°47′45″N 53°21′07″E
- Planned by: United Arab Emirates
- Target: Iranian oil facility
- Date: 8 April 2026; 10:00 a.m. IRST (UTC+3:30)
- Executed by: United Arab Emirates Air Force
- Outcome: Oil output at the facility crippled

On 8 April 2026, the United Arab Emirates (UAE) secretly conducted an airstrike on an Iranian oil refinery at Lavan Island around the time the 2026 Iran war ceasefire was being announced, in retaliation for the 2026 Iranian strikes on the United Arab Emirates. Although the perpetrator was initially unknown, The Wall Street Journal later reported that the UAE was responsible for the attack. The UAE has not publicly acknowledged the strikes.

== Background ==
Since the beginning of the 2026 Iran war, sparked by airstrikes on Iran carried out by the United States and Israel, the United Arab Emirates had been repeatedly attacked by Iranian missile and drone attacks. The attacks targeted the UAE more than any other country, which caused severe damage to energy facilities, airports, and hotels, as well as killing at least 10 civilians. Iran repeatedly condemned the UAE for its close ties with Israel and its hosting of U.S. bases on its territory. Iranian foreign minister Abbas Araghchi warned the UAE of "dangerous consequences" unless it pulled away from the United States and Israel. The UAE doubled down on its ties with the United States and Israel, and has received Israeli military support against Iranian attacks, including Israel's Iron Dome missile defense system.

== Attack ==
On 8 April 2026, at around 10 a.m. IRST (6:30 a.m. GMT), the oil facility at Lavan Island was targeted in an "enemy attack" which caused heavy damage to the oil output, according to the National Iranian Oil Refining and Distribution Company. Israel denied involvement in the attack, and no party claimed responsibility. The attack took place "around the time" U.S. President Donald Trump was "announcing a cease-fire in the war." Safety and firefighting teams worked to contain the fire. The attack sparked a large fire at the oil facility and was expected to leave its output crippled for months. At the time of the attack, Iran reported that its oil facility was struck by enemy fire, but did not name the source. It attacked the UAE and Kuwait with missile and drone attacks in response.

Some military analysts and Iranian state media identified United Arab Emirates Air Force Mirage 2000 fighter jets as having launched the attack, and while the UAE confirmed that Mirage jets were scrambled to intercept Iranian drones, it did not confirm or deny reports that they attacked Lavan Island.

On 11 May 2026, citing "people familiar with the matter," The Wall Street Journal and Bloomberg reported that the United Arab Emirates had been secretly carrying out military strikes in Iran in coordination with Israel, which included the attack on Lavan Island.

The UAE Ministry of Foreign Affairs declined to comment on the strikes, but affirmed that it reserves the right to respond to hostile attacks, including militarily.

== Reactions ==
On 14 May, Iranian foreign minister Abbas Araghchi condemned the UAE for being "directly involved in the aggressive action against my country" and said that "they participated in these attacks and may even have acted directly against us."

According to The Telegraph, Trump administration officials have been encouraging the UAE to increase its involvement in the Iran war and seize Lavan Island using its military.
