= Faror Island =

Island of the Persian Gulf

Jazireh-ye Faror Lighthouse
- Location: Faror Island, Iran
- Coordinates: 26°17′34″N 54°30′06″E

Tower
- Foundation: concrete base
- Construction: metal skeletal tower
- Height: 17 m (56 ft)
- Shape: square pyramidal tower
- Markings: white and red horizontal band tower

Light
- Focal height: 170 m (560 ft)
- Range: 8 nmi (15 km; 9.2 mi)
- Characteristic: Fl W 5s

Jazireh-ye Bani Faror Lighthouse
- Location: Lesser Faror Island, Iran
- Coordinates: 26°07′06″N 54°26′44″E

Tower
- Foundation: concrete base
- Construction: metal skeletal tower
- Shape: square pyramidal tower

Light
- Focal height: 44 m (144 ft)
- Range: 8 nmi (15 km; 9.2 mi)
- Characteristic: Fl W 5s

Faror or Farvar Island (Persian: فارور) is an island in Hormozgan province in Iran.

== Geography ==
Faror Island is 14.5 by 7.5 km (9.0 by 4.7 mi) in size, 26.20 km^{2} (10.12 sq mi) in area, and reaches a height of 476 metres (1,562 ft). It is located 58 kilometres (36 mi) from the city of Abu Moussa and 227 kilometres (141 mi) from Bandar Abbas. Little Faror Island, with an area of 0.8 km^{2} (0.31 sq mi), lies 15.8 km (9.8 mi) south-south-west of Faror Island. Administratively, Faror and Little Faror are part of the Central District of Abumusa County.

Faror is largely uninhabited, except for a few government officials. It is situated in one of the world's earthquake belts. The remains of ruined buildings and water wells on the island testify to the presence of some settlements in the past. The island also contains a deposit of iron which is estimated to be about 15,000 tons. As of 2016, the island is used by a detachment of IRGC Navy marines (Sepah Navy Special Force).

== Environment ==
Wild birds such as white-eared bulbuls, hoopoes, bee-eaters, laughing doves and yellow wagtails inhabit the island. The Iranian government established the Faror Protected Area on the island. Visitors can enjoy bird watching in the area. Arabian gazelles have been introduced to the island. It has been designated an Important Bird Area (IBA) by BirdLife International because it supports colonies of Saunders's and white-cheeked terns.

== See also ==
- List of lighthouses in Iran
