= Kish, Iran =

City in Hormozgan province, Iran

Kish Persian: كيش
- City
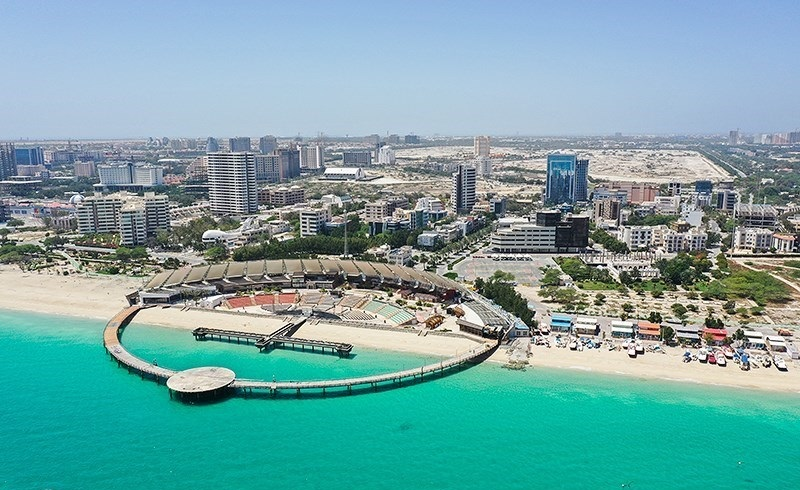
- The skyline of Kish

- Location within Iran
- Coordinates: 26°33′19″N 53°59′06″E
- Country: Iran
- Province: Hormozgan
- County: Bandar Lengeh
- District: Kish

Population (2016)
  - Total: 39,853
- Time zone: UTC+3:30 (IRST)

Kish (Persian: كيش;) (Note: Also romanized as Kīsh) is a coastal city in, and the capital of, Kish District of Bandar Lengeh County, Hormozgan province, Iran. The city is on Kish Island, a special zone of Iran. The island is served by Kish International Airport, and has a visa policy separate from the Iranian mainland, such that foreign tourists can obtain a visa on arrival.

== Geography ==
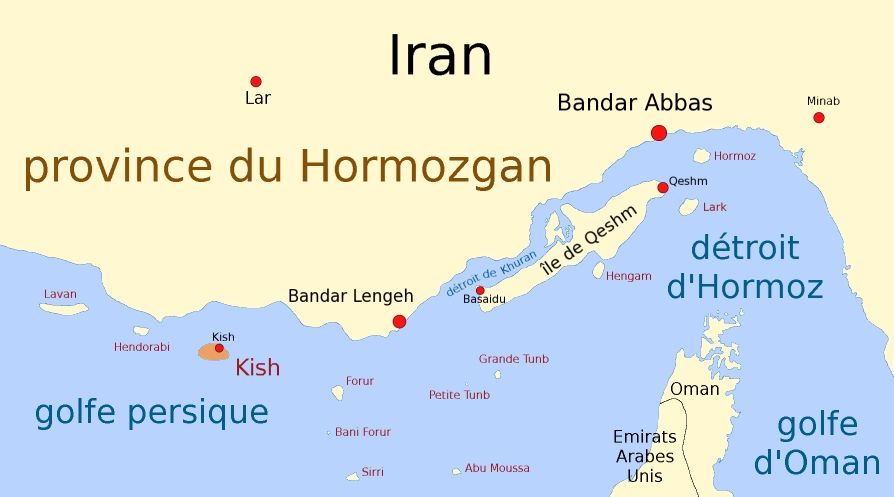
The geographic context of Kish Island

Kish Island is located in the Persian Gulf, 18 kilometers off the coast of Iran and approximately 300 kilometers from the port of Bandar Abbas. Its 91.5 km² area is roughly elliptical, measuring 13 km east-west and 7 km north-south. The island reaches its highest altitude at its easternmost point, rising to 45 meters above sea level. The average elevation is 32 meters. The island's circumference is approximately 42 km.

== History ==
One of the earliest travel accounts mentioning and describing a visit to this island is that of the Greek navarch Nearchus, in the 4th century BC, during the reign of Alexander the Great. Other accounts followed, such as those by Xenophon, who referred to the island as "Mother of Kamtina".

Before the arrival of Islam, Kish was ruled by several peoples, mostly from the Persian region, such as the Elamites, Sumerians, Achaemenids, Seleucids, Arsacids, and Sassanids. Until 643, the island of Kish, along with the other islands of the Persian Gulf, was Persian in culture and language. After the Muslim expansion and the fall of the Sassanid Empire, Kish, like the rest of Iran, was governed by the Umayyad and then Abbasid caliphates.

It briefly reverted to Persian rule thanks to the victory of the Iranian Saffarid dynasty under the Abbasid Caliphate. Several dynasties succeeded one another, including finally the Pahlavi dynasty, which ruled over Iran and the island of Kish until the Iranian Revolution of 1979 and the establishment of an Islamic Republic in Iran.

The West also took an interest in these territories, with colonial ambitions. In the 16th century, the Portuguese, a major maritime power and colonizer for several centuries, entered the Persian Gulf and occupied the island of Kish, particularly interested in controlling trade with the countries of the Indian Ocean. The Safavids regained control of the island. Under the reign of Abbas I the Great, the Portuguese were expelled from the Persian Gulf.

After the departure of the Portuguese colonial administration, the Persian Gulf enjoyed a period of relative peace until the Zand dynasty in the 18th century. The British, previously economic partners, then revealed their ambitions in the region. This marked the beginning of an era of British influence. Allied with the still-present Portuguese, they brought Bahrain, officially Iranian, under their control and seized Kish by force. They subsequently sold the island. After this period of occupation, the island was recaptured by the Iranians.

At the beginning of the 20th century, the island was once again under foreign occupation. It ended during the reign of Mohammad Reza Pahlavi. The Shah of Iran then dedicated the island to high-end tourism, transforming it into a destination for pleasure catering to a very wealthy clientele. This focus on tourism ended with the Iranian Revolution, but tourism activity has nevertheless continued. In 2022, for the FIFA World Cup in Qatar, the island of Kish, in close proximity to the United Arab Emirates, hosted some of the sports delegations. An additional passenger terminal was built at Kish International Airport, along with extensions to the commercial and passenger port and an Olympic village on the island.

== Demographics ==
=== Population ===
In the 2006 census, the city's population was 20,667, in 6,163 households. The 2011 census counted 24,819 people, in 7,954 households. The 2016 census counted 39,853 people, in 13,403 households.

== Gallery ==
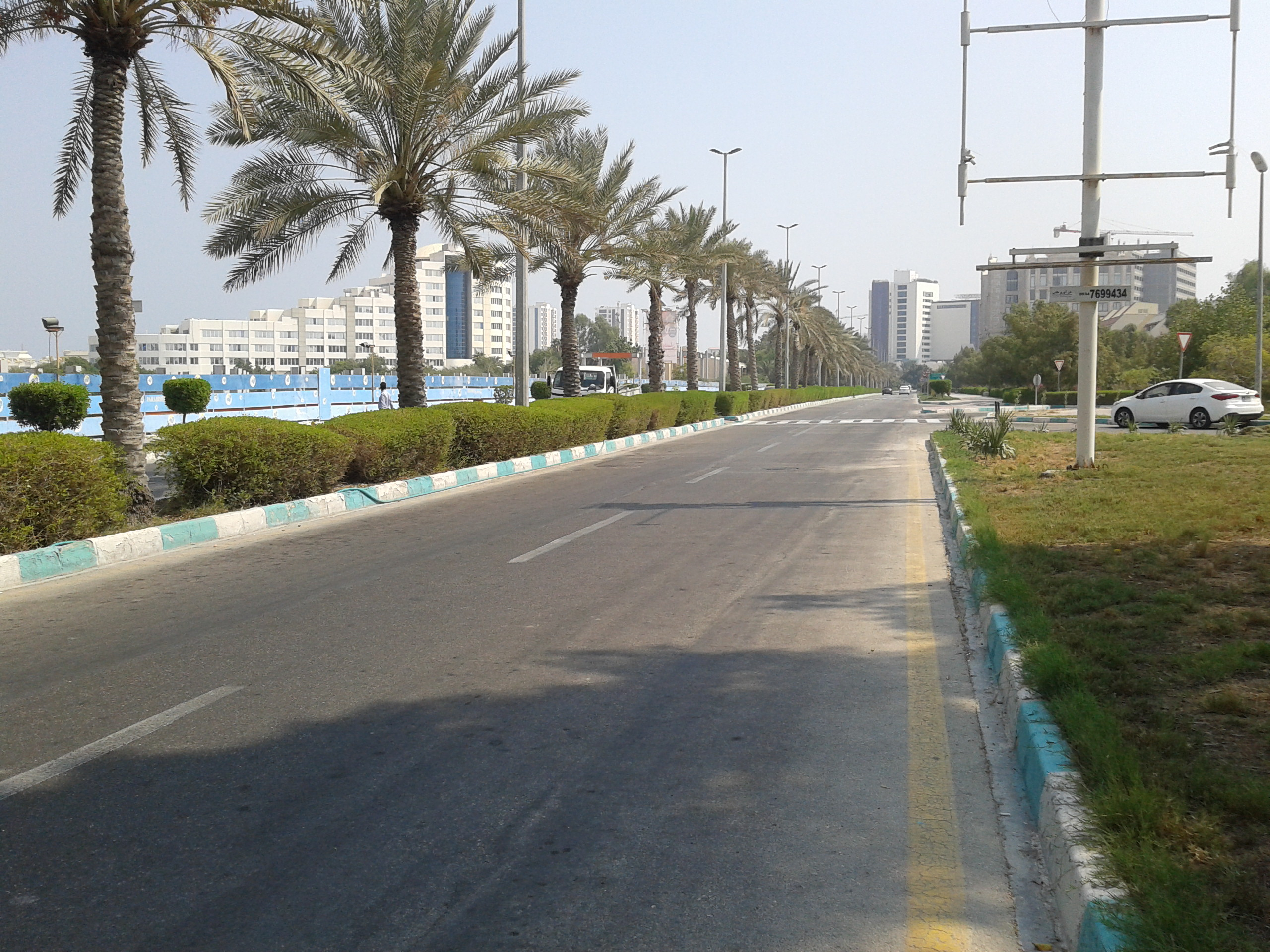
A street in Kish

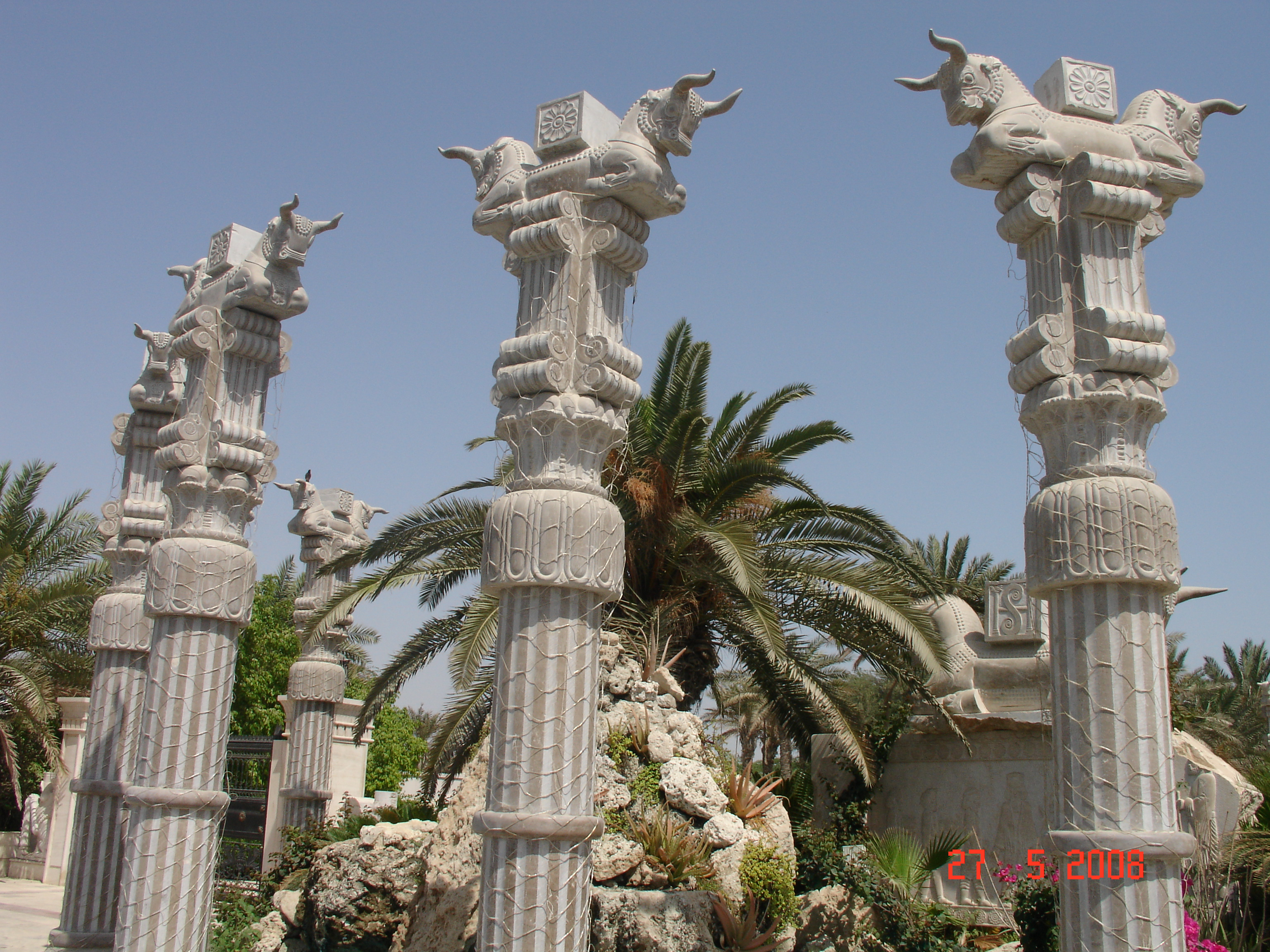
Dariush Grand Hotel

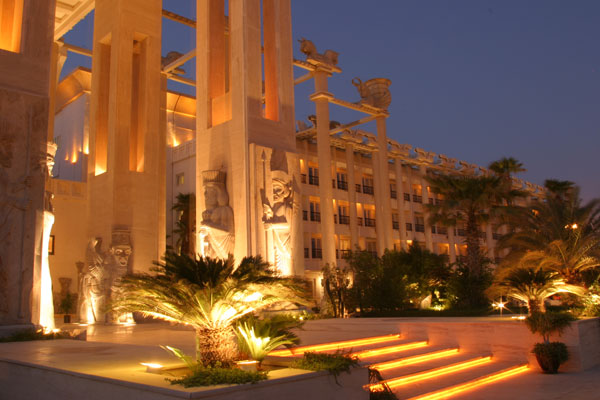
Dariush Grand Hotel

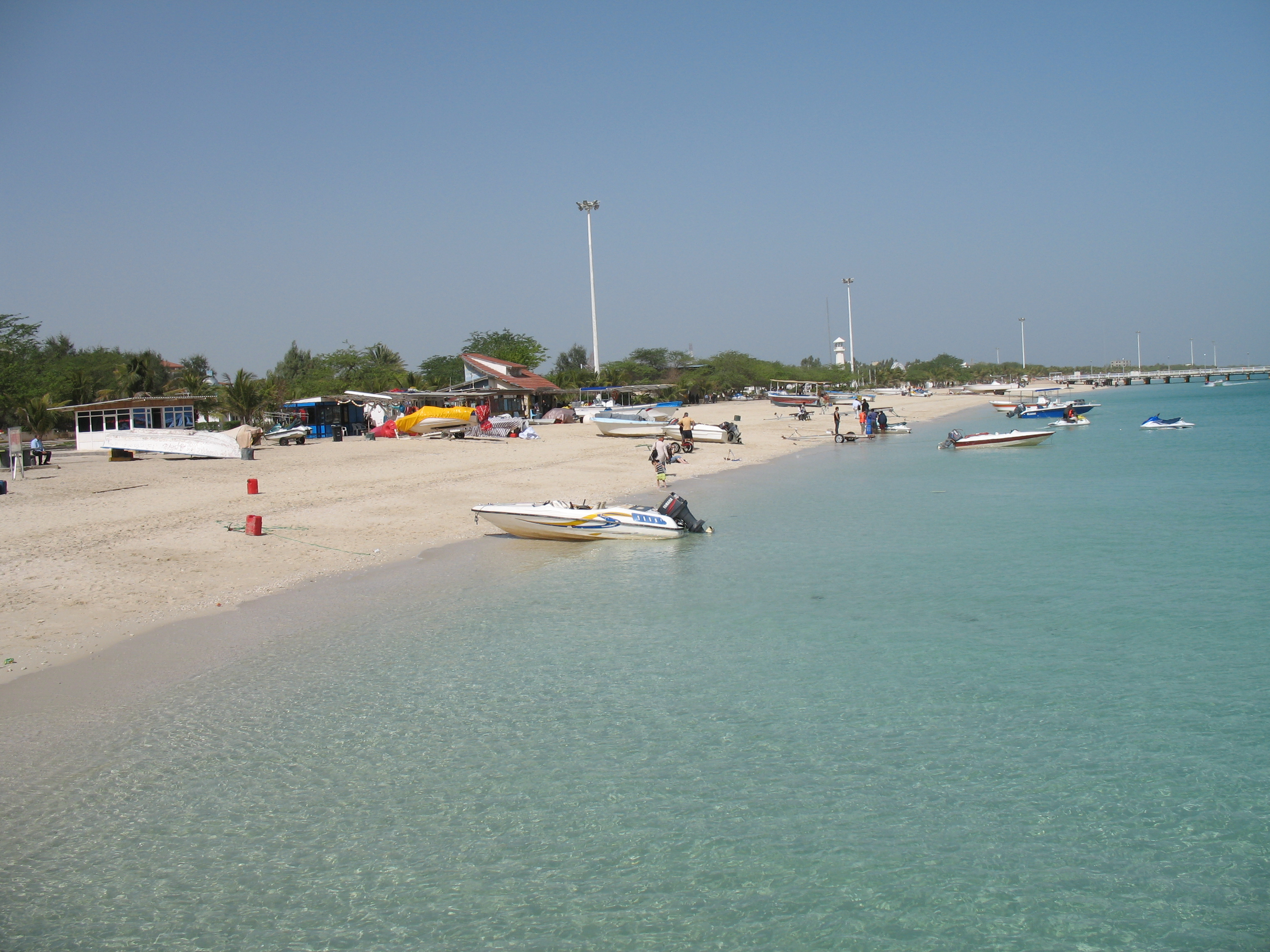
A beach in Kish

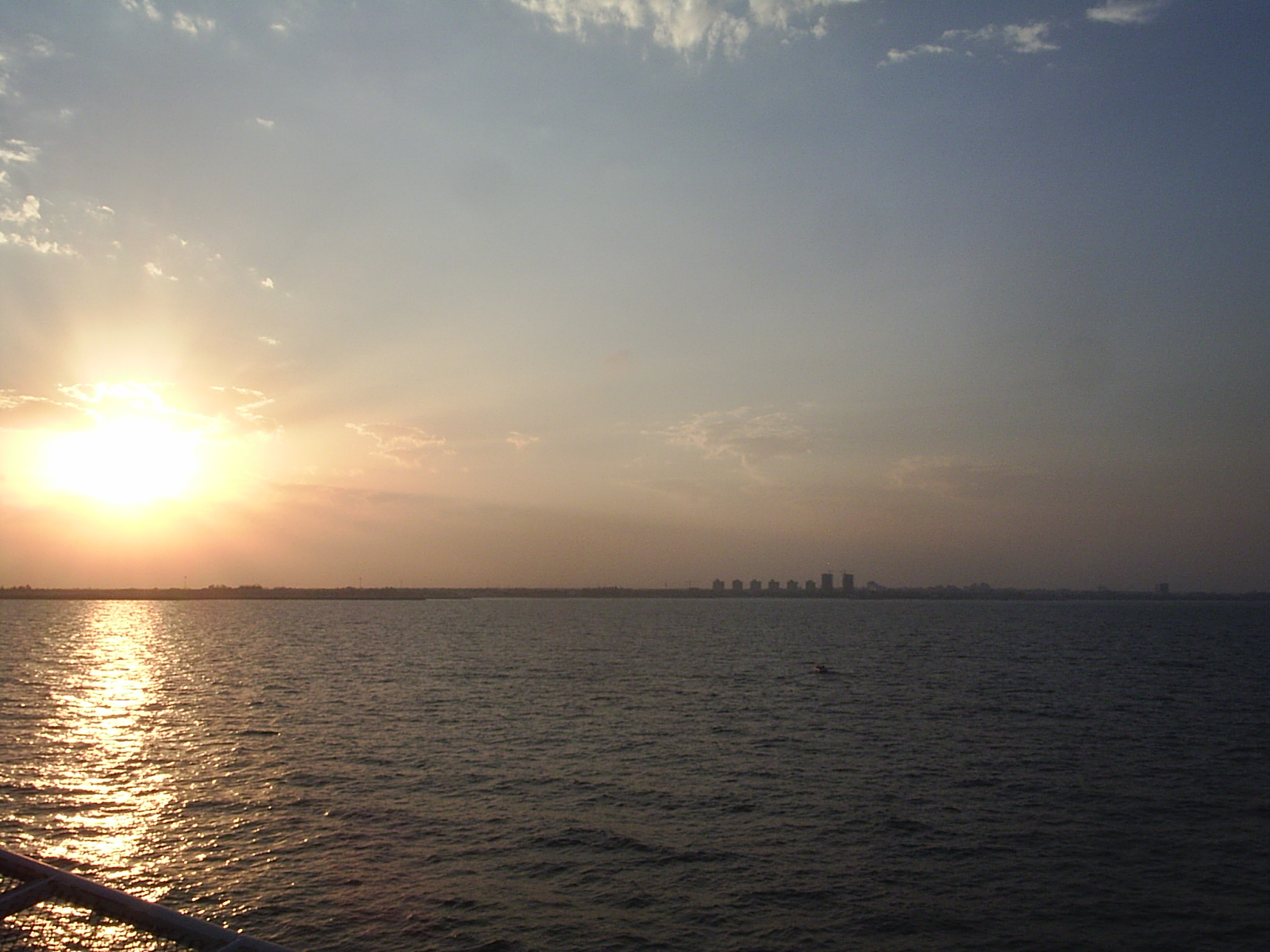
Sunset on Kish

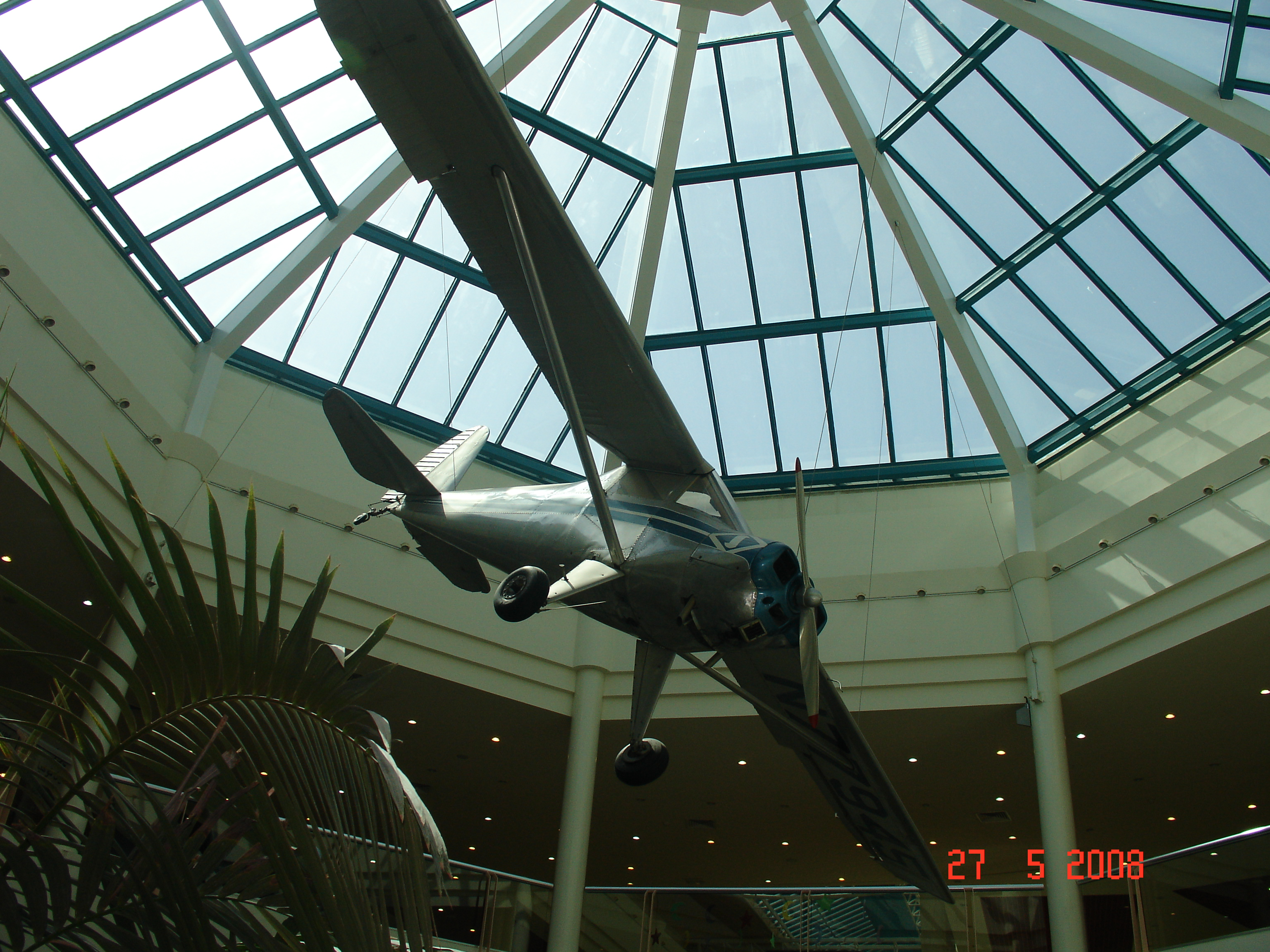
Pardis Market

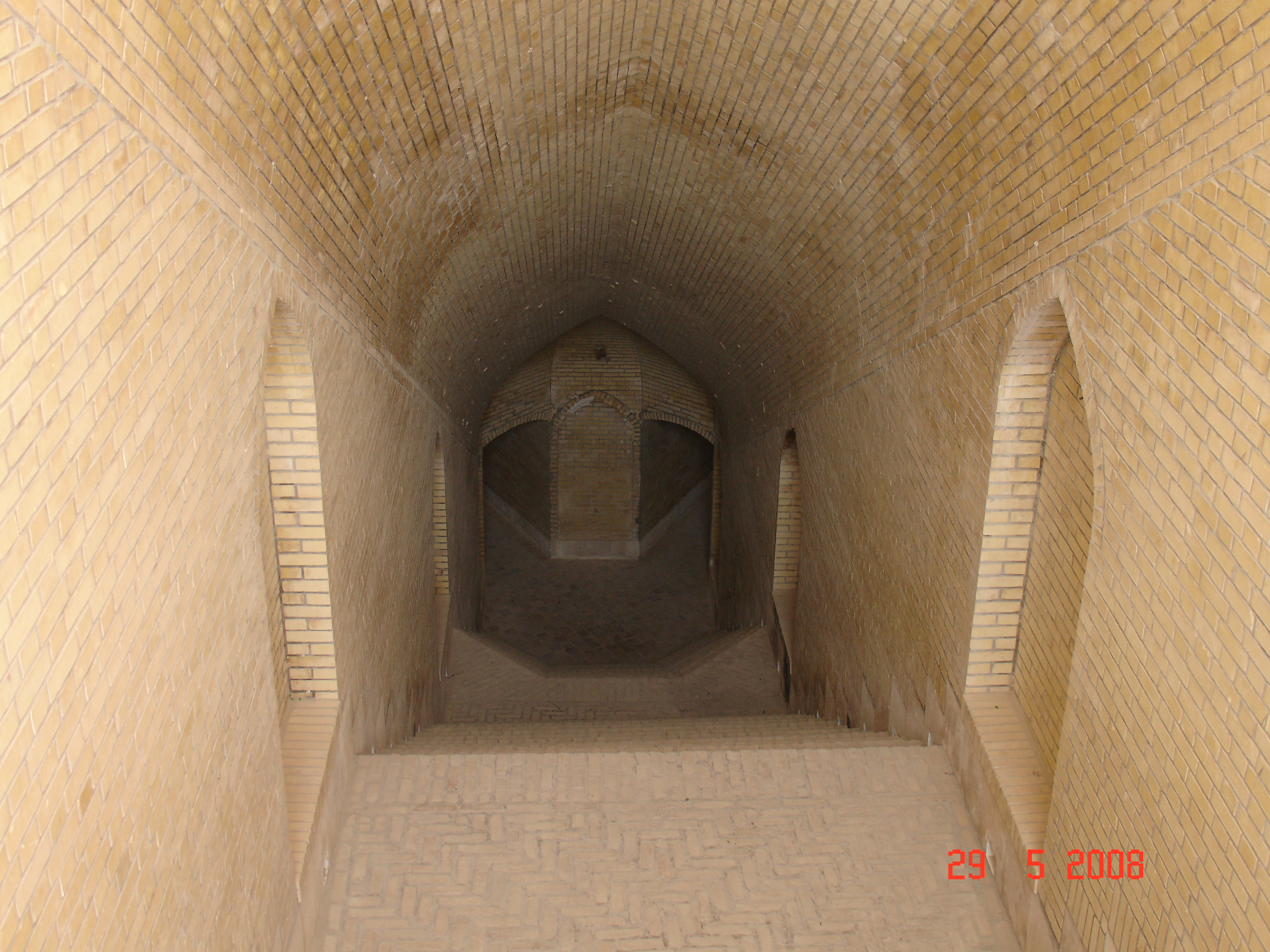
A water cooling storage building (Abanbar)

== See also ==
Media related to Kish, Iran at Wikimedia Commons
