= Minu Island =

Iranian island in the Persian Gulf

Native name: Persian: جزیره مینو
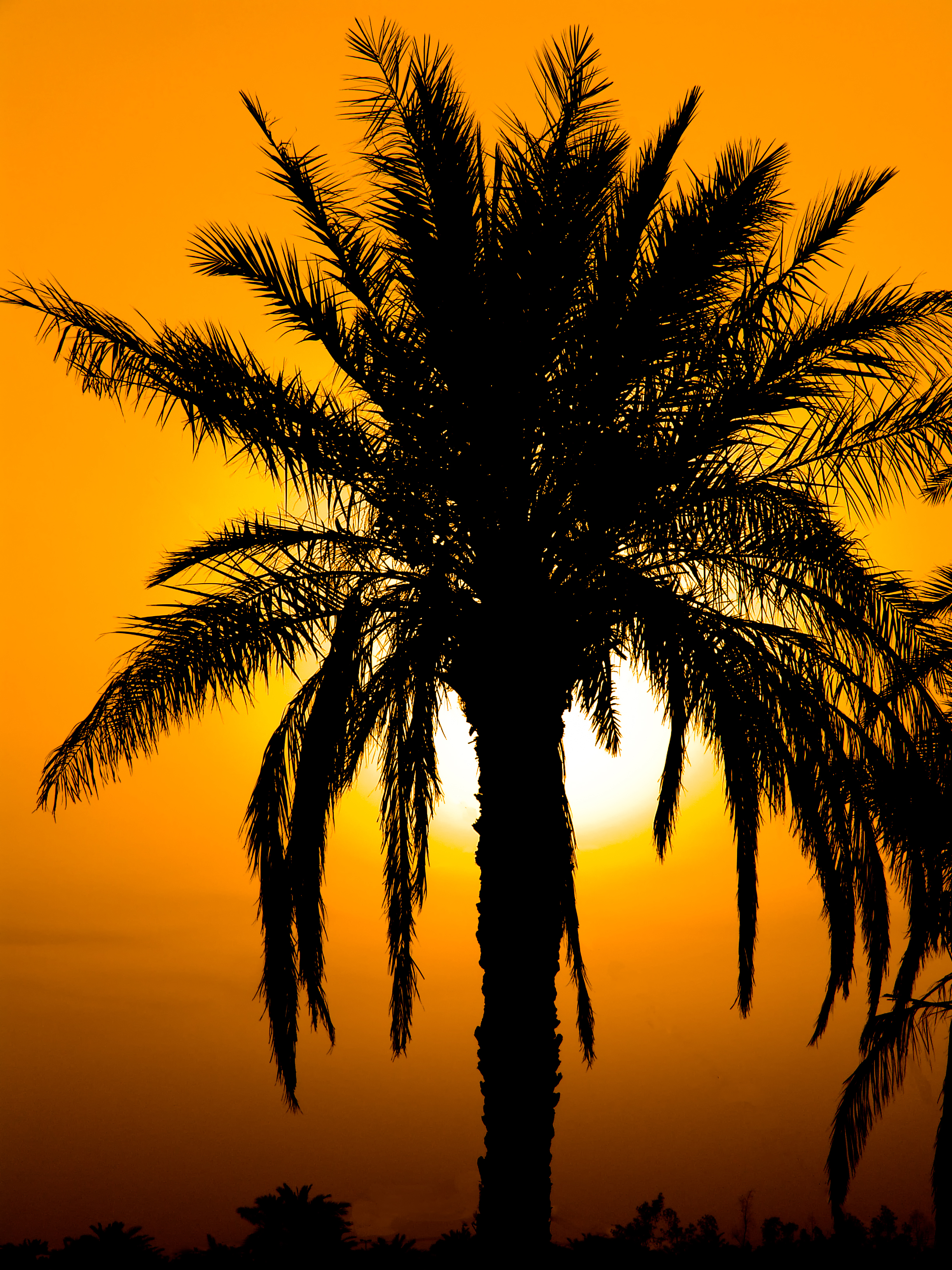
- Palm and sunset on Minu Island

- Location within Iran
- Interactive map of Minu Island

Geography
- Location: Khuzestan, Iran
- Coordinates: 30°20′33″N 48°13′00″E
- Area: 17.8 km^{2} (6.9 sq mi)

Administration
- Iran

Demographics
- Population: 9,154 (2016)

Minu Island (Persian: جزیره مینو and Arabic: جزيرة صلبوخ) (Note: Also romanized as Jazireh-ye Minu; also translated as Minoo Island) is in Khorramshahr County of Khuzestan province in the Persian Gulf, in southwestern Iran.

The island is between the cities of Abadan and Khorramshahr. Minu District, which includes the city of Minushahr, is nearly co-extensive with the island.

== Demographics ==
=== Population ===
At the time of the 2006 National Census, the district's population (comprising most of the island's inhabitants), was 7,582 in 1,562 households. The following census in 2011 counted 8,267 people in 2,139 households. The 2016 census measured the population of the rural district as 9,154 in 2,549 households.

Much of the island population comprises Arabs.
