= Sirri Island =

Native name: جزیره سیری
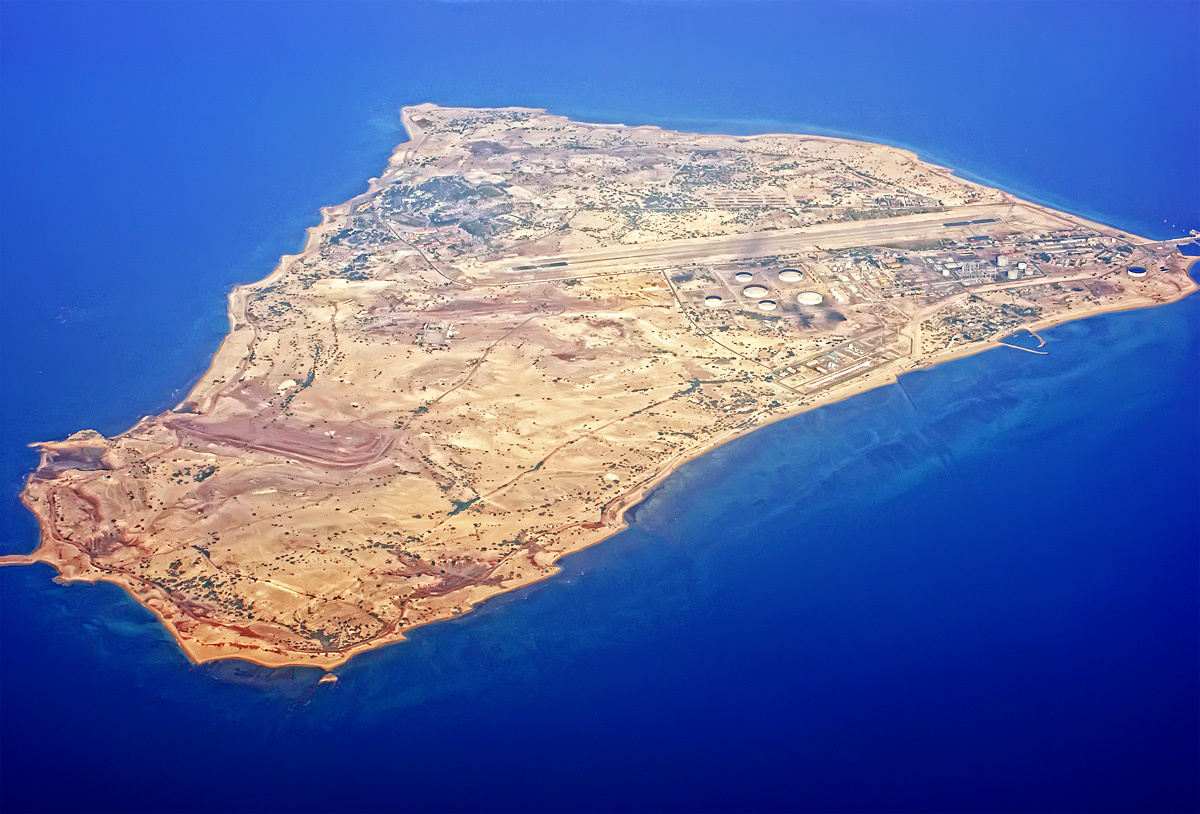
- Sirri Island
- Interactive map of Sirri Island

Geography
- Location: Persian Gulf
- Coordinates: 25°54′34″N 54°32′22″E
- Area: 17.3 km^{2} (6.7 sq mi)
- Length: 5.6 km (3.48 mi)
- Width: 3 km (1.9 mi)
- Highest elevation: 33 m (108 ft)

Administration
- Iran
- Province: Hormozgan
- County: Abumusa

Jazireh-ye Sirri Lighthouse
- Location: Sirri Island, Iran
- Coordinates: 25°54′19″N 54°33′05″E

Tower
- Foundation: concrete base
- Construction: metal skeletal tower
- Height: 20 m (66 ft)
- Shape: square pyramidal skeletal tower

Light
- Focal height: 30 m (98 ft)
- Range: 10 nmi (19 km; 12 mi)
- Characteristic: Fl(3) W 15s

Sirri Island (Persian: جزیره سیری) is an Iranian island in the Persian Gulf, part of Abumusa County, Hormozgan Province. It is situated 76 kilometres (47 mi) from Bandar-e Lengeh and 50 kilometres (31 mi) west of Abu Musa island. Sirri is one of six islands in the Abu Musâ Island Group (and is part of Hormozgan province). The island is almost 5.6 kilometres (3.5 mi) long with a width of about 3 kilometres (1.9 mi). It covers an area of 17.33 square kilometres (6.7 square miles). The highest point on the island is 33 metres (108 feet) above sea level. Like the other islands in the Persian Gulf, it enjoys a warm and humid climate.

Sirri Island is the location of an oil platform destroyed by the naval forces of the United States during Operation Praying Mantis on April 18, 1988. (The platform was reconstructed after the war.) The Sirri District includes the Sivand and Dena Oil Fields, Nosrat Oil Field, Alvand Oil Field and the Esfand Oil Field along with the Nasr offshore oil platforms. The airport located on the island (Sirri Airport (SXI)) is uncontrolled with a single 8,140-foot (2,480 m) runway, although Iranian military planes have been sighted there.

The Iranian Offshore Oil Company (IOOC) has undertaken several major oil and gas development projects on the island including a $500 million (USD) NGL Gas factory and a development contract to develop and increase production of the Iranian Nosrat oil field which is projected to increase crude oil production capacity from 5,000 to 16,000 barrels per day (790 to 2,540 cubic metres per day). Another project plans for the renovation of the crude oil export facilities and construction of two large crude oil storage tanks, each with 500,000 barrels (79,000 m^{3}) capacity, on the island is also planned.

== Climate ==
Sirri Island has a hot desert climate (Köppen climate classification BWh). All months have a daily mean temperature above 20 °C (68 °F).

In the summer, Sirri Island sees some of the highest average dew points of any place in the world, averaging above 28 °C (82 °F) in July and August. As a result, heat indices generally top 50 °C (122 °F) for most days during the summer. This immense humidity causes summer diurnal ranges to be lower than in normal desert climates, and is a result of air flow from the warm waters of the Persian Gulf.

Climate data for Siri Island (normals 1991–2020 extremes 1983-2020)
Month	Jan	Feb	Mar	Apr	May	Jun	Jul	Aug	Sep	Oct	Nov	Dec	Year
Record high °C (°F)	29.6 (85.3)	30.6 (87.1)	32.0 (89.6)	38.8 (101.8)	41.6 (106.9)	43.0 (109.4)	40.6 (105.1)	41.6 (106.9)	40.6 (105.1)	42.6 (108.7)	34.8 (94.6)	31.0 (87.8)	43.0 (109.4)
Mean daily maximum °C (°F)	23.3 (73.9)	23.6 (74.5)	25.3 (77.5)	29.4 (84.9)	33.6 (92.5)	35.1 (95.2)	36.1 (97.0)	36.5 (97.7)	35.6 (96.1)	33.5 (92.3)	29.5 (85.1)	25.5 (77.9)	30.6 (87.1)
Daily mean °C (°F)	21.4 (70.5)	21.7 (71.1)	23.3 (73.9)	26.9 (80.4)	30.7 (87.3)	32.7 (90.9)	34.1 (93.4)	34.6 (94.3)	33.7 (92.7)	31.5 (88.7)	27.5 (81.5)	23.6 (74.5)	28.5 (83.3)
Mean daily minimum °C (°F)	18.4 (65.1)	18.9 (66.0)	20.3 (68.5)	23.5 (74.3)	27.2 (81.0)	29.4 (84.9)	31.3 (88.3)	32.0 (89.6)	30.6 (87.1)	28.1 (82.6)	24.3 (75.7)	20.6 (69.1)	25.4 (77.7)
Record low °C (°F)	9.4 (48.9)	10.0 (50.0)	11.6 (52.9)	16.0 (60.8)	20.0 (68.0)	24.8 (76.6)	26.6 (79.9)	28.4 (83.1)	25.0 (77.0)	20.0 (68.0)	15.2 (59.4)	13.6 (56.5)	9.4 (48.9)
Average precipitation mm (inches)	25.7 (1.01)	12.7 (0.50)	25.9 (1.02)	3.7 (0.15)	0.4 (0.02)	0.0 (0.0)	0.3 (0.01)	0.0 (0.0)	0.0 (0.0)	1.2 (0.05)	15.3 (0.60)	30.1 (1.19)	115.3 (4.55)
Average precipitation days (≥ 1.0 mm)	2.9	1.6	2.7	0.7	0.1	0.0	0.0	0.0	0.0	0.1	1.3	2.5	11.9
Average relative humidity (%)	61	65	69	68	66	71	72	71	68	62	57	60	66
Average dew point °C (°F)	13.3 (55.9)	14.6 (58.3)	17.0 (62.6)	20.1 (68.2)	23.2 (73.8)	26.5 (79.7)	28.2 (82.8)	28.5 (83.3)	26.9 (80.4)	23.2 (73.8)	18.1 (64.6)	15.2 (59.4)	21.2 (70.2)
Mean monthly sunshine hours	231	225	226	269	323	330	300	299	287	297	258	235	3,280
Source 1: NOAA NCEI
Source 2: IRIMO

== See also ==
- List of lighthouses in Iran
- List of islands of Iran
- Hormozgān
