= Nakhiloo Island =

Iranian island in the Persian Gulf

- Location within Persian Gulf

Geography
- Location: Persian Gulf
- Coordinates: 27.823°N 51.472°E
- Area: 6 km^{2} (2.3 sq mi)

Administration
- Iran

Nakhiloo Island (Persian: جزیره نخیلو, romanized: jazireh-ye Nakhiloo, also Nakhilo, Nakhilu or Nokhailo) is an Iranian island in the Persian Gulf. This small island has an area of around 6 km^{2}, has a sandy coastline of some 8 km, and is 5 km from Ommolkaram. The island is located southeast of Bushehr.

== Important Bird Area ==
Nakhiloo, along with neighbouring Morghu and Ummal Karam islands, has been designated an Important Bird Area (IBA) by BirdLife International because they support breeding crab-plovers as well as colonies of bridled, Saunders's, lesser crested and white-cheeked terns. The islands are also a breeding site for hawksbill sea turtles. A study conducted on Nakhiloo Island between 2005 and 2007 recorded substantial breeding populations of several seabird species. The Western Reef Heron showed an increase in breeding pairs from 10 in 2005 to 44 in 2007. The Lesser Crested Tern had a maximum of 16,124 breeding pairs in 2005, slightly declining to 15,650 in 2007. Swift Tern populations grew significantly, from 254 pairs in 2005 to 1,294 pairs in 2007. The Bridled Tern remained the most abundant species, with breeding numbers peaking at 29,461 pairs in 2007. The study emphasized that Nakhiloo Island is a critical but fragile breeding habitat for seabirds and recommended reducing human activity on the island to support conservation efforts.
