= Hengam Island =

Native name: جزیره_هنگام
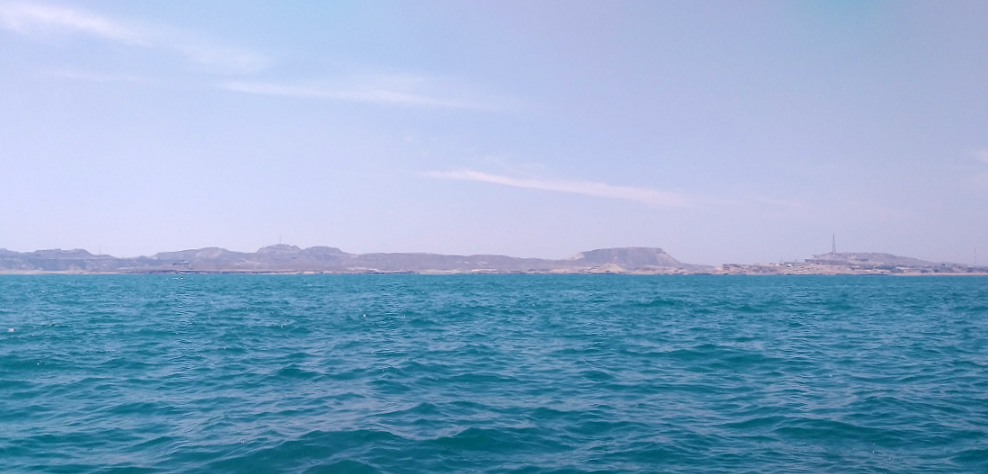
- Interactive map of Hengam Island

Administration
- Iran
- Province: Hormozgān
- County: Qeshm
- Bakhsh: Central

Jazīreh-ye Hengām Lighthouse
- Location: Hengam Island, Hormozgan Province, Iran
- Coordinates: 26°36′43″N 55°51′46″E

Tower
- Construction: masonry tower
- Height: 12 m (39 ft)
- Shape: cylindrical tower with balcony and lantern
- Markings: white tower
- Power source: solar power

Light
- Focal height: 37 m (121 ft)
- Range: 12 nmi (22 km; 14 mi)
- Characteristic: Fl W 10s

Hengam Island (Persian: جزیره هنگام) is an Iranian island located south of Qeshm Island, Iran, in the Persian Gulf.

== Geography ==
The island is 36.6 kilometres (22.7 miles) wide and shaped like a truncated cone. The island is generally calcareous and generally low-lying. The highest point on the island is Nakas Mountain with an altitude of about 106 metres (348 feet). Hengam Island is about 2 kilometres (1.2 miles) away from Qeshm Island.

== See also ==
- Hormozgān Province
- List of islands of Iran
- List of lighthouses in Iran

== Gallery ==
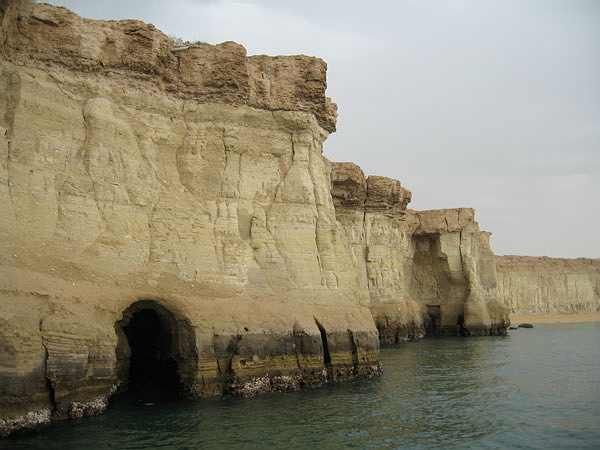
Hengam Island

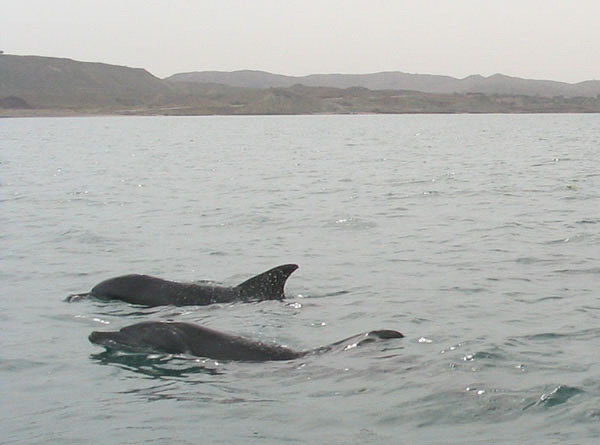
Indo-Pacific bottlenose dolphins nearby Hengam Island
