= Kish District =

District in Hormozgan province, Iran

Kish District Persian: بخش کیش
- District
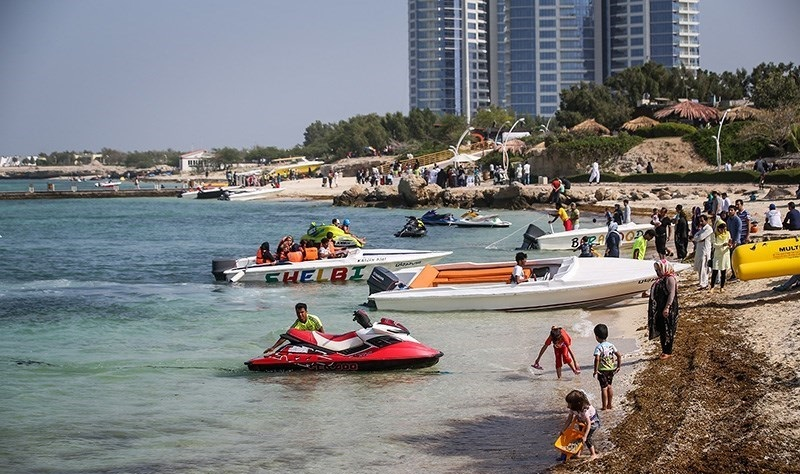
- Kish Island

- Location within Iran
- Coordinates: 26°37′16″N 53°36′05″E
- Country: Iran
- Province: Hormozgan
- County: Bandar Lengeh
- Capital: Kish

Population (2016)
  - Total: 41,258
- Time zone: UTC+3:30 (IRST)

Kish District (Persian: بخش کیش) is in Bandar Lengeh County, Hormozgan province, Iran. Its capital is the city of Kish.

== Demographics ==
=== Population ===
At the time of the 2006 National Census, the district's population was 21,637 in 6,344 households. The following census in 2011 counted 25,952 people in 8,230 households. The 2016 census measured the population of the district as 41,258 inhabitants in 13,738 households.

=== Administrative divisions ===
Kish District Population
Administrative Divisions	2006	2011	2016
Kish RD	79	86	191
Lavan RD	891	1,047	1,214
Kish (city)	20,667	24,819	39,853
Total	21,637	25,952	41,258
RD = Rural District

== Gallery ==
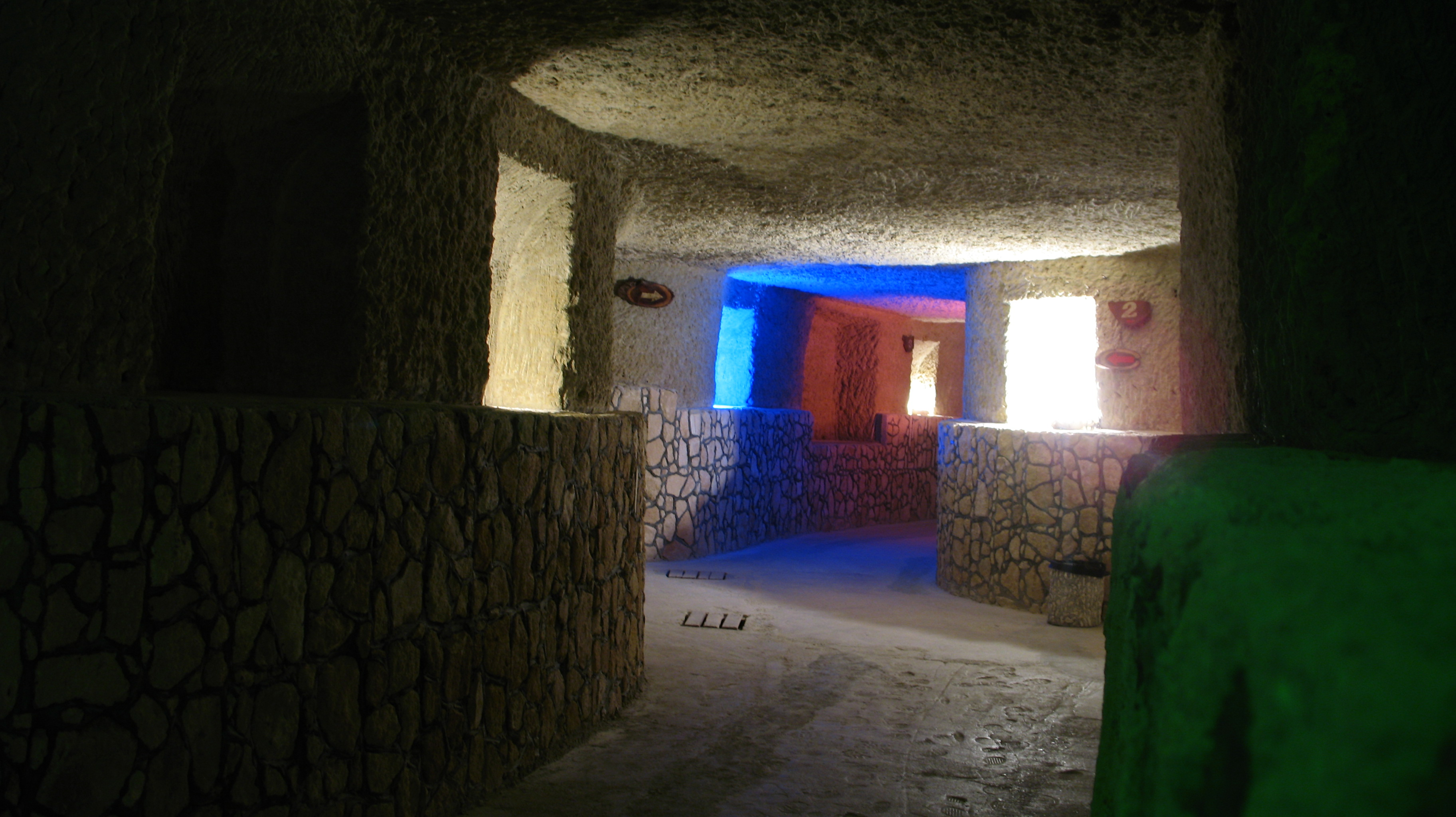
Kariz Underground City

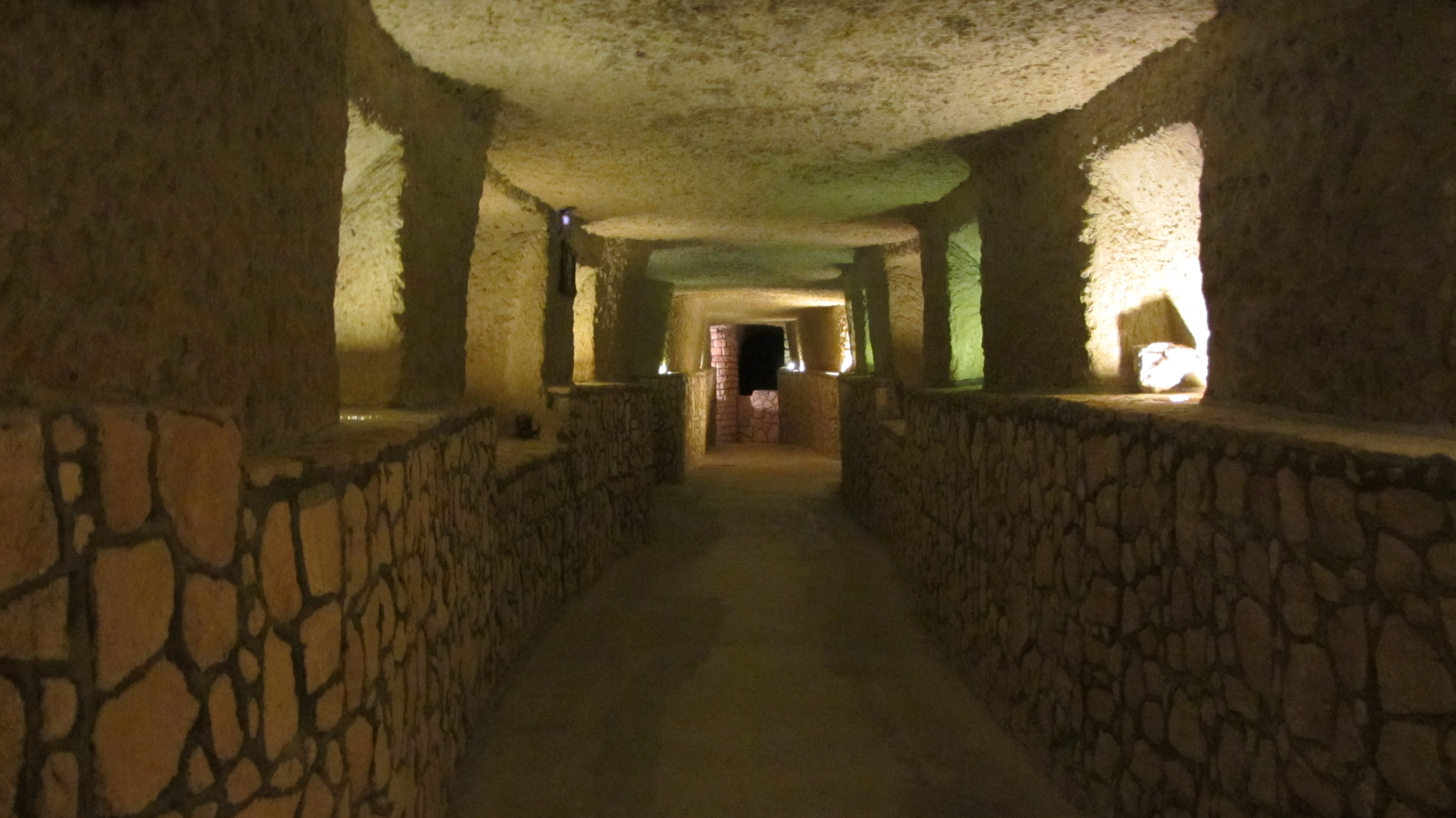
Kariz Underground City

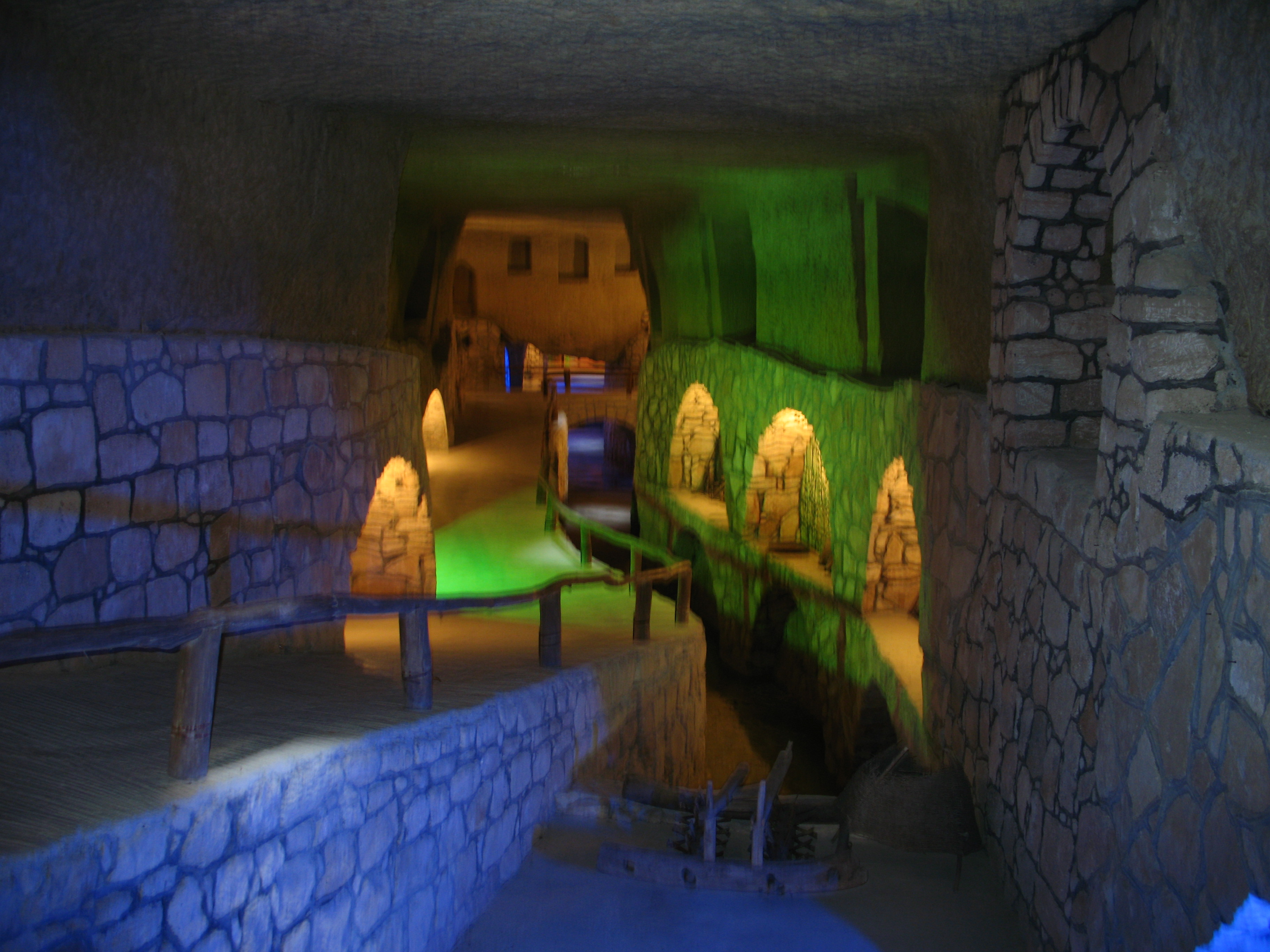
Kariz Underground City
